= 2022–23 Bodrumspor season =

Bodrumspor
2022–23 season
- Chairman: Rıza Karakaya
- Manager: İsmet Taşdemir
- Stadium: Bodrum İlçe Stadium
- TFF First League: 4th
- Promotion play-offs: Semi-final
- Turkish Cup: Fifth round
- Top goalscorer: League: Kenan Özer (14); All: Kenan Özer (14)

The 2022–23 season was the 92nd season in the existence of Bodrumspor and the club's first season in the second division of Turkish football. In addition to the domestic league, Bodrumspor participated in this season's edition of the Turkish Cup. The season covered the period from 1 July 2022 to 30 June 2023.

== Players ==
=== First-team squad ===
As of 20 January 2023

Note: Flags indicate national team as defined under FIFA eligibility rules; some limited exceptions apply. Players may hold more than one non-FIFA nationality.

No.	Pos.	Nation	Player
1	GK	POR	Diogo Sousa (on loan from Antalyaspor)
3	DF	TUR	Abdurrahman Canlı
4	MF	TUR	Erkan Değişmez
6	DF	TUR	Süleyman Özdamar
7	MF	TUR	Yekta Kurtuluş
8	MF	TUR	Samet Yalçın
9	FW	TUR	Koray Kılınç
10	FW	TUR	Kenan Özer
11	MF	ALB	Omar Imeri
13	MF	TUR	Hakan Yesil (on loan from Trabzonspor)
14	DF	TUR	Osman Kocaağa
16	DF	TUR	Eren Albayrak
17	FW	TUR	Süleyman Güneş
18	FW	MKD	Adis Jahović
21	MF	TUR	Apti Mert Çayır
22	MF	TUR	Harun Alpsoy
23	DF	TUR	Üzeyir Ergün

No.	Pos.	Nation	Player
26	DF	GHA	Musah Mohammed
28	DF	TUR	Onur Akbay
29	FW	TUR	Musa Caner Aktaş
32	GK	TUR	Bahri Can Tosun
34	DF	TUR	Ali Aytemur
35	GK	TUR	Egemen Gençalp
41	FW	TUR	Gökdeniz Bayrakdar (on loan from Antalyaspor)
48	FW	TUR	Celal Dumanlı
50	FW	NGR	Aminu Umar
55	DF	TUR	Bahadır Erol
66	GK	TUR	Ali Türkan
68	DF	TUR	İsmail Tarım
70	FW	TUR	Ferit Özler
77	DF	TUR	Cenk Şen
80	MF	TUR	Recep Aydın
88	FW	TUR	Erdem Çetinkaya (on loan from Kasımpaşa)
99	FW	IDN	Ronaldo Kwateh

=== Out on loan ===
Note: Flags indicate national team as defined under FIFA eligibility rules; some limited exceptions apply. Players may hold more than one non-FIFA nationality.

No.	Pos.	Nation	Player
—	GK	TUR	Melih Enes Uygun (at Gümüşhanespor until 30 June 2023)
—	DF	TUR	Ali Eren İyican (at 1461 Trabzon until 30 June 2023)
—	MF	TUR	Halil İbrahim Sevinç (at Serik Belediyespor until 30 June 2023)
—	MF	TUR	Sergen Yatağan (at Serik Belediyespor until 30 June 2023)
—	FW	TUR	Habib Biçer (at Sapanca Gençlikspor until 30 June 2023)

No.	Pos.	Nation	Player
—	FW	TUR	Oğuzhan Doğan (at Serik Belediyespor until 30 June 2023)
—	FW	TUR	Murat Elkatmış (at Belediye Kütahyaspor until 30 June 2023)
—	FW	TUR	Harun Kavaklıdere (at Serik Belediyespor until 30 June 2023)
—	FW	TUR	Adem Metin Türk (at Arnavutköy Belediyespor until 30 June 2023)

== Pre-season and friendlies ==
Win Draw Loss Fixtures

== Competitions ==
=== Overall record ===
Competition	First match	Last match	Starting round	Final position	Record							
Competition	First match	Last match	Starting round	Final position	Pld	W	D	L	GF	GA	GD	Win %
TFF First League	12 August 2022	21 May 2023	Matchday 1	4th	36	18	8	10	55	34	+21	50.00
Turkish Cup	9 November 2022	22 December 2022	Fourth round	Fifth round	2	1	0	1	3	3	+0	50.00
Total					38	19	8	11	58	37	+21	50.00

Last updated: 21 May 2023
Source: Soccerway

=== TFF First League ===
==== League table ====
Pos	Team	Pld	W	D	L	GF	GA	GD	Pts	Qualification or relegation
2	Çaykur Rizespor (P)	36	18	14	4	64	35	+29	68	Promotion to the Süper Lig
3	Pendikspor (O, P)	36	19	10	7	65	36	+29	67	Qualification for the Süper Lig Playoff Final
4	Bodrumspor	36	18	8	10	55	34	+21	62 (Note: Head-to-head points: Bodrumspor 5–0 Sakaryaspor, Sakaryaspor 2–1 Bodrumspor; Eyüpspor 2–1 Sakaryaspor, Sakaryaspor 2–0 Eyüpspor; Bodrumspor 3–0 Eyüpspor, Eyüpspor 1–0 Bodrumspor)	Qualification for the Süper Lig Playoff Quarter Finals
5	Sakaryaspor	36	20	2	14	59	47	+12	62	Qualification for the Süper Lig Playoff Quarter Finals
6	Eyüpspor	36	18	8	10	40	30	+10	62	Qualification for the Süper Lig Playoff Quarter Finals

Source: TFF
Rules for classification: 1) Points; 2) Head-to-head points; 3) Head-to-head goal difference; 4) Head-to-head goals scored; 5) Goal difference; 6) Goals scored
(O) Play-off winners; (P) Promoted

==== Results summary ====
Overall								Home						Away					
Pld	W	D	L	GF	GA	GD	Pts	W	D	L	GF	GA	GD	W	D	L	GF	GA	GD
36	18	8	10	55	34	+21	62	8	7	3	29	15	+14	10	1	7	26	19	+7

Source: Spor Toto 1. Lig

==== Results by round ====
Round	1	2	3	4	5	6	7	8	9	10	11	12	13	14	15	16	17	18	19	20	21	22	23	24	25	26	27	28	29	30	31	32	33	34	35	36	37	38
Ground	H	A	H	H	A	H	A	H	A	H		H	A	H	A	H	A	H	A	A	H	A	A	H	A	H	A	H	A		A	H	A	H	A	H	A	H
Result	W	W	D	W	L	D	L	W	W	D	B	W	L	L	D	W	W	D	W	W	L	W	L	W	L	L	L	D	W	B	W	D	W	W	L	W	W	D
Position	1	1	1	1	1	2	5	4	3	2	4	2	5	7	8	6	6	4	3	3	4	3	3	3	5	7	7	7	7	7	6	7	7	6	7	6	5	4

Source: Spor Toto 1. Lig
A = Away; H = Home; B = Bye; W = Win; D = Draw; L = Loss

==== Matches ====
The league schedule was released on 5 July.

14 August 2022 1	Bodrumspor	3–1	Yeni Malatyaspor	Muğla
17:00 TRT (UTC+3)	Yalçın 21', 35'; Özdamar 26'; Aydın (yellow card) 59'	Report	Emeksiz (yellow card) 31'; Donsah (yellow card) 50'; Akgün 75'; Çağıran (yellow card) 87'	Stadium: Bodrum İlçe Stadium; Attendance: 1,445; Referee: Direnç Tonusluoğlu

21 August 2022 2	Ankara Keçiörengücü	1–3	Bodrumspor	Ankara
16:30 TRT (UTC+3)	Kartal (yellow card) 80'; İnan 82'	Report	Erol 3'; Mohammed (yellow card) 27'; Dumanlı 29'; Özer (yellow card) 90'; Reşmen 90+1' (o.g.)	Stadium: Aktepe Stadium; Attendance: 1,635; Referee: Mehmet Türkmen

28 August 2022 3	Bodrumspor	3–3	Adanaspor	Muğla
17:00 TRT (UTC+3)	Kaplan 6' (o.g.); Dumanlı 69'; Aktaş 90+1'; Mohammed (yellow card) 90+3'	Report	Jallow (yellow card) 19' (goal) 45+3', 90+5'; Kaplan (yellow card) 45+2'; Sacko 67'; Çamoğlu (yellow card) 90'	Stadium: Bodrum İlçe Stadium; Referee: Adnan Deniz Kayatepe

3 September 2022 4	Bodrumspor	3–0	Eyüpspor	Muğla
17:00 TRT (UTC+3)	Ergün 31' (pen.); Aydın 34'; Şen (yellow card) 45+5'; Özer (yellow card) 82'; Jahović 90' (pen.)	Report	Akdağ (yellow card) 20'; Öztürk (yellow card) 20' (yellow-red card) 90+2'; Tekin (yellow card) 37'; Uçar (red card) 86'	Stadium: Bodrum İlçe Stadium; Referee: Adem Cinek

11 September 2022 5	Altay	2–0	Bodrumspor	İzmir
20:00 TRT (UTC+3)	Paixão 40'; Tekin (yellow card) 49'; Şen 74' (o.g.); Björkander (yellow card) 76'; Eren Erdoğan (yellow card) 82'; Ünlü (yellow card) 88'	Report	Canlı (yellow card) 87'	Stadium: Alsancak Mustafa Denizli Stadium; Referee: Murat Erdoğan

18 September 2022 6	Bodrumspor	1–1	Manisa	Muğla
16:00 TRT (UTC+3)	Özer 45+3' (pen.); Akbay (yellow card) 75'; Çetinkaya (yellow card) 90+5'	Report	Uysal 88'; Giritlioğlu (red card) 90+5'	Stadium: Bodrum İlçe Stadium; Referee: Reşat Onur Coşkunses

1 October 2022 7	Çaykur Rizespor	2–0	Bodrumspor	Rize
19:00 TRT (UTC+3)	Yılmaz 67'; Pala (yellow card) 73'; Altıntaş 80' (pen.); Çetin (yellow card) 90+2'	Report	Akbay (yellow card) 45+2'; Dumanlı (yellow card) 58'	Stadium: Çaykur Didi Stadium; Referee: Alper Akarsu

8 October 2022 8	Bodrumspor	5–0	Sakaryaspor	Muğla
13:30 TRT (UTC+3)	Özer 19', 27'; Jahović (yellow card) 27' (goal) 58'; Özdamar (yellow card) 33'; Yalçın 36', 90+2'	Report	Odabaşoğlu (yellow card) 12'; Menderes (yellow card) 72'	Stadium: Bodrum İlçe Stadium; Referee: Cihan Aydın

16 October 2022 9	Erzurumspor	1–2	Bodrumspor	Erzurum
13:30 TRT (UTC+3)	Yumlu (yellow card) 44'; Akbaş 81', (yellow card) 90+7'; Olanare (yellow card) 90'	Report	Yalçın (yellow card) 11', (goal) 37'; Aytemur (yellow card) 25'; Özer 45+1'; Dumanlı (yellow card) 83'; Kurtuluş (yellow card) 90+4'; Sousa (yellow card) 90+5'	Stadium: Kazım Karabekir Stadium; Referee: Oğuzhan Çakır

23 October 2022 10	Bodrumspor	1–1	Bandırmaspor	Muğla
13:30 TRT (UTC+3)	Aydın (yellow card) 19'; Güneş (yellow card) 30'; Jahović (yellow card) 32'; Yalçın 43'	Report	Özcan (yellow card) 24'; Cavlun (yellow card) 32'; Dembélé 38'; Ayçiçek (yellow card) 41'; Avcı (yellow card) 45+1'; Tshibangu (yellow card) 77'	Stadium: Bodrum İlçe Stadium; Referee: Burak Pakkan

11	Bye

5 November 2022 12	Bodrumspor	1–0	Boluspor	Muğla
13:30 TRT (UTC+3)	Özer (yellow card) 44'; Özdamar 52'; Şen (yellow card) 88'	Report	Bregu (yellow card) 47'; Kayamba (yellow card) 90+4'; Oularé (yellow card) 90+4'	Stadium: Bodrum İlçe Stadium; Referee: Turgut Doman

12 November 2022 13	Pendikspor	3–0	Bodrumspor	Istanbul
13:30 TRT (UTC+3)	Regattin 13', (penalty missed) 37'; Kappel 19', (yellow card) 19'; Thuram 30'; Tekdal (yellow card) 34'; Öztorun (yellow card) 77'; Öğür (yellow card) 81'	Report	(yellow card) 17' Yalçın; (yellow card) 56' Mohammed; (yellow card) 85' Dumanlı	Stadium: Pendik Stadium; Referee: Muhammet Ali Metoğlu

20 November 2022 14	Bodrumspor	1–2	Tuzlaspor	Muğla
13:30 TRT (UTC+3)	Dumanlı 11'; Değişmez (red card) 20'; Çetinkaya (yellow card) 24'; Akbay (yellow card) 68'; Özer (yellow card) 88'	Report	Can (yellow card) 37'; Has (yellow card) 49'; Başacıkoğlu 62', 90+2'; Konuk (yellow card) 79'	Stadium: Bodrum İlçe Stadium; Referee: Ramazan Keleş

25 November 2022 15	Denizlispor	0–0	Bodrumspor	Denizli
20:00 TRT (UTC+3)	Djédjé (yellow card) 40'	Report		Stadium: Denizli Atatürk Stadium; Referee: Adnan Deniz Kayatepe

3 December 2022 16	Bodrumspor	2–0	Gençlerbirliği	Muğla
13:30 TRT (UTC+3)	Yalçın 2'; Imeri 21'; Akbay (yellow card) 33'	Report		Stadium: Bodrum İlçe Stadium; Referee: Oğuzhan Çakır

11 December 2022 17	Altınordu	0–2	Bodrumspor	İzmir
19:00 TRT (UTC+3)	Fındıklı (yellow card) 29'; Koçak (yellow card) 38'	Report	Ergün 8'; Dumanlı 12'; Çetinkaya (yellow card) 55'; Diogo Sousa (yellow card) 87'	Stadium: Bornova Aziz Kocaoğlu Stadium; Referee: Burak Pakkan

17 December 2022 18	Bodrumspor	0–0	Samsunspor	Muğla
13:30 TRT (UTC+3)	Mohammed (yellow card) 48'	Report	Laura (yellow card) 52'	Stadium: Bodrum İlçe Stadium; Referee: Mehmet Türkmen

26 December 2022 19	Göztepe	0–1	Bodrumspor	İzmir
20:00 TRT (UTC+3)	Özçimen (yellow card) 90+9'; Nukan (yellow card) '"'UNIQ--templatestyles-000000CE-QINU'"'EOM'	Report	6' Çetinkaya; (yellow card) 31' Akbay	Stadium: Gürsel Aksel Stadium; Referee: Reşat Onur Coşkunses

15 January 2023 20	Yeni Malatyaspor	1–3	Bodrumspor	Malatya
16:00 TRT (UTC+3)	Emeksiz (yellow card) 16'; Alkan 45+4' (pen.); Müjde (yellow card) 81'	Report	Özer 32'; Dumanlı (yellow card) 45+6'; Ergün (yellow card) 52'; Kılınç 71'; Bayrakdar 90+10'	Stadium: New Malatya Stadium; Referee: Alper Akarsu

22 January 2023 21	Bodrumspor	1–2	Ankara Keçiörengücü	Muğla
13:30 TRT (UTC+3)	Kılınç (yellow card) 10'; Özer 49' (pen.), (yellow card) 88'; Akbay (yellow card) 64'	Report	İnan 26', (yellow card) 85'; Kartal (yellow card) 49'; Karadeniz 75'; Uçar (yellow card) 90+2'; Reşmen (yellow card) 90+7'	Stadium: Bodrum İlçe Stadium; Referee: Ozan Ergün

29 January 2023 22	Adanaspor	1–2	Bodrumspor	Adana
13:30 TRT (UTC+3)	Güveli (yellow card) 37'; Jallow 61'	Report	Özer 20' (pen.); Özdamar (yellow card) 25'; Yalçın (yellow card) 37'; Umar 90'	Stadium: New Adana Stadium; Referee: Feridun Daldaş

28 February 2023 23	Eyüpspor	1–0	Bodrumspor	Istanbul
20:00 TRT (UTC+3)	Pektemek (yellow card) 47'; Akdağ 76'	Report	Mohammed (yellow card) 75'	Stadium: Eyüp Stadium; Referee: Oğuzhan Aksu

5 March 2023 24	Bodrumspor	2–0	Altay	Muğla
13:30 TRT (UTC+3)	Özer 25'; Bayrakdar 51'; Ergün (yellow card) 89'	Report	Paixão (yellow card) 31'	Stadium: Bodrum İlçe Stadium; Referee: Muhammet Ali Metoğlu

8 March 2023 25	Manisa	2–1	Bodrumspor	Manisa
14:30 TRT (UTC+3)	Odabaşoğlu (yellow card) 28'; Ba (yellow card) 41'; David Domgjoni 90+3'; Koç 90+6', (yellow card) 90+6'	Report	Özdamar (yellow card) 2'; Şen 23'; Yalçın (yellow card) 32'; Akbay (yellow card) 55'	Stadium: Mümin Özkasap Stadium; Referee: Erdem Mertoğlu

12 March 2023 26	Bodrumspor	1–2	Çaykur Rizespor	Muğla
13:30 TRT (UTC+3)	Dumanlı 59'; Imeri (yellow card) 88'	Report	Bolasie (yellow card) 16'; Amilton (yellow card) 52'; Osmanoğlu (yellow card) 81'; Keser 85', (yellow card) 86'; Olawoyin 90+6'	Stadium: Bodrum İlçe Stadium; Referee: Direnç Tonusluoğlu

20 March 2023 27	Sakaryaspor	2–1	Bodrumspor	Sakarya
20:00 TRT (UTC+3)	Roshi 43', (yellow card) 87'; Menderes (yellow card) 64'; Nalepa (yellow card) 80'; Uzun 83'	Report	Dumanlı (yellow card) 25' (yellow-red card) 39'; Özer 50'; Sousa (yellow card) 78'	Stadium: New Sakarya Atatürk Stadium; Referee: Turgut Doman

26 March 2023 28	Bodrumspor	0–0	Erzurumspor	Muğla
13:30 TRT (UTC+3)	Değişmez (red card) 39'; Çetinkaya (yellow card) 40'; Özer (yellow card) 44'; Akbay (yellow card) 76'	Report	Bayrak (yellow card) 15'; Shala (yellow card) 49'; Yumlu (yellow card) 67'	Stadium: Bodrum İlçe Stadium; Referee: Abdullah Buğra Taşkınsoy

29 March 2023 29	Bandırmaspor	0–4	Bodrumspor	Balıkesir
14:30 TRT (UTC+3)	Mulumba (yellow card) 4' (yellow-red card) 28'; Cavlun (yellow card) 32'	Report	Bayrakdar 20', 78'; Yalçın 35'; Özer 42'; Mohammed (yellow card) 62'	Stadium: Bandırma 17 Eylül Stadium; Referee: Gürcan Hasova

30	Bye

7 April 2023 31	Boluspor	1–4	Bodrumspor	Bolu
20:30 TRT (UTC+3)	Bregu (yellow card) 28'; Alsan 40'; Ulaş (yellow card) 47'	Report	Özer 52' (pen.); Bayrakdar 57', 65', 73'	Stadium: Bolu Atatürk Stadium; Referee: Oğuzhan Aksu

11 April 2023 32	Bodrumspor	2–2	Pendikspor	Muğla
16:00 TRT (UTC+3)	Özer 14', (yellow card) 43'; Bayrakdar 28'; Aytemur (yellow card) 41'; Yalçın (yellow card) 60'	Report	Öztorun (yellow card) 35'; Regattin 42' (pen.), (yellow card) 43'; Sülüngöz (yellow card) 50'; Thuram (yellow card) 67'; Kappel 69'; Özdemir (yellow card) 80'; Kaya (yellow card) 90+6'; Öğür (yellow card) '"'UNIQ--templatestyles-0000013F-QINU'"'EOM'	Stadium: Bodrum İlçe Stadium; Referee: Burak Pakkan

15 April 2023 33	Tuzlaspor	0–1	Bodrumspor	Istanbul
16:00 TRT (UTC+3)	Demirci (yellow card) 31'; N'Zuzi Mata (yellow card) 32'; Artan (yellow card) 65' (yellow-red card) 90+2'; Awuku (yellow card) 90'	Report	Özer 18' (pen.), (yellow card) 86'; Bayrakdar (yellow card) 86'	Stadium: Sancaktepe Stadium; Referee: Burak Olcar

23 April 2023 34	Bodrumspor	1–0	Denizlispor	Muğla
13:30 TRT (UTC+3)	Özmert 31' (pen.); Akbay (yellow card) 72'; Özdamar (yellow card) 87'	Report	Gündüz (yellow card) 89'	Stadium: Bodrum İlçe Stadium; Referee: Erdem Mertoğlu

28 April 2023 35	Gençlerbirliği	2–1	Bodrumspor	Ankara
20:00 TRT (UTC+3)	Ertürk 51'; Doukara 67'; Babacan (yellow card) 28'; Keskin (yellow card) 58'; Angeler (red card) 62'; Gökçe (yellow card) 90+5'; Karakaş (yellow card) 90+13'	Report	Akbay (yellow card) 44'; Özmert 60' (pen.); Yalçın (yellow card) 71'; Çetinkaya (yellow card) 81' (yellow-red card) 90+12'; Kurtuluş (yellow card) 90+12'	Stadium: Eryaman Stadium; Referee: Suat Arslanboğa

7 May 2023 36	Bodrumspor	1–0	Altınordu	Muğla
16:00 TRT (UTC+3)	Özer 79' (pen.); Bayrakdar (yellow card) 90+4'	Report	Sürmeli (yellow card) 74'; Gürlük (yellow card) 89'	Stadium: Bodrum İlçe Stadium; Referee: Ümit Öztürk

16 May 2023 37	Samsunspor	0–1	Bodrumspor	Samsun
17:00 TRT (UTC+3)	Abdioğlu (yellow card) 42'; Özbaskıcı (yellow card) 51'; Gültekin (yellow card) 63'	Report	Bayrakdar 31'; Özdamar (yellow card) 61'	Stadium: Samsun Stadium; Referee: Erkan Özdamar

21 May 2023 38	Bodrumspor	1–1	Göztepe	Muğla
16:00 TRT (UTC+3)	Ergün (yellow card) 55'; Özmert (yellow card) 58'; Yalçın (yellow card) 71', (goal) 74'	Report	Nukan (yellow card) 64'; Ngalina 70'; Hasić (yellow card) 90+4'	Stadium: Bodrum İlçe Stadium; Referee: Murat Erdoğan

==== Play-offs ====
26 May 2023 Quarter-finals	Bodrumspor	3–1	Göztepe	Muğla
17:00 TRT (UTC+3)	Şen 16'; Köybaşı 45+1' (o.g.); Yalçın (yellow card) 49'; Özdamar (yellow card) 87'; Sousa (yellow card) 90+9'; Umar 90+9'	Report	Nukan 86'	Stadium: Bodrum İlçe Stadium; Referee: Arda Kardeşler

31 May 2023 Semi-final first leg	Eyüpspor	1–0	Bodrumspor	Istanbul
20:00 TRT (UTC+3)	Pektemek 34'	Report		Stadium: Eyüp Stadium; Referee: Kadir Sağlam

4 June 2023 Semi-final second leg	Bodrumspor	2–0 (2–1 agg.)	Eyüpspor	Muğla
16:00 TRT (UTC+3)	Ergün 90+1'; Özdamar 90+8'	Report		Stadium: Bodrum İlçe Stadium

4 June 2023 Semi-final second leg	Pendikspor	2–1	Bodrumspor	Akhisar
20:00 TRT (UTC+3)	Regattin 29' (pen.); Thuram 31'	Report	Hatipoğlu 38' (o.g.)	Stadium: Spor Toto Akhisar Stadium; Referee: Abdulkadir Bitigen

=== Turkish Cup ===
9 November 2022 Fourth round	Altınordu	0–1 (a.e.t.)	Bodrumspor	İzmir
14:00 TRT (UTC+3)		Report	Çetinkaya (yellow card) 73'; Çayır 107'; Alpsoy 111'	Stadium: Tire Gazi Mustafa Kemal Atatürk Stadium; Referee: Ozan Ergün

22 December 2022 Fifth round	Konyaspor	3–2 (a.e.t.)	Bodrumspor	Konya
15:00 TRT (UTC+3)	Ülgün (yellow card) 41'; Hadžiahmetović 64' 105' (pen.); Yazğılı (yellow card) 90+3'; Subaşı 115'; Demir (yellow card) 120+1'	Report	Aytemur (yellow card) 51'; Güneş (yellow card) 60'; Kurtuluş 83', 109'; Çetin (yellow card) 104'; Tarım (yellow card) 116'; Dumanlı (yellow card) 118'; Çetinkaya (yellow card) 120+1'	Stadium: Konya Metropolitan Municipality Stadium; Referee: Murat Erdoğan
