= 2023–24 Bodrum F.K. season =

Bodrum F.K.
2023–24 season
- Manager: İsmet Taşdemir
- Stadium: Bodrum İlçe Stadium
- TFF First League: 4th
- Promotion Play-offs: Final
- Turkish Cup: Fifth round

The 2023–24 season is Bodrum F.K.'s 93rd season in existence and second consecutive in the TFF First League, the second division of Turkish football. They will also compete in the Turkish Cup.

== Players ==
=== First-team squad ===
As of 23 September 2023

Note: Flags indicate national team as defined under FIFA eligibility rules; some limited exceptions apply. Players may hold more than one non-FIFA nationality.

No.	Pos.	Nation	Player
1	GK	POR	Diogo Sousa
3	DF	CZE	Ondřej Čelůstka
4	MF	TUR	Erkan Değişmez
5	DF	TUR	Ali Eren İyican
6	DF	TUR	Süleyman Özdamar
8	MF	TUR	Samet Yalçın
10	FW	TUR	Kenan Özer
11	MF	ALB	Omar Imeri
16	DF	TUR	Eren Albayrak
17	FW	GBS	Aldair Baldé
18	FW	MKD	Adis Jahović
19	FW	GHA	Haqi Osman
20	MF	POR	Pedro Brazão
21	MF	TUR	Ahmet Aslan
23	DF	TUR	Üzeyir Ergün
26	MF	GHA	Musah Mohammed

No.	Pos.	Nation	Player
29	MF	TUR	Adem Metin Türk
32	GK	TUR	Bahri Can Tosun
34	DF	TUR	Ali Aytemur
35	GK	TUR	Egemen Gençalp
41	FW	TUR	Gökdeniz Bayrakdar
48	FW	TUR	Celal Dumanlı
49	FW	TUR	Habib Biçer
63	DF	TUR	Kaan Bengi
70	MF	AZE	Ege Bilsel
72	MF	TUR	Muhammed Gönülaçar
77	DF	TUR	Cenk Şen
90	MF	TUR	Halil İbrahim Sevinç
94	FW	TUR	Burak Çoban
97	MF	TUR	Arda Çetin
99	FW	IDN	Ronaldo Kwateh

=== Out on loan ===
Note: Flags indicate national team as defined under FIFA eligibility rules; some limited exceptions apply. Players may hold more than one non-FIFA nationality.

No.	Pos.	Nation	Player
—	DF	TUR	Osman Kocaağa (at Muş 1984 Muşspor until 30 June 2024)
—	DF	TUR	İsmail Tarım (at Arnavutköy Belediyespor until 30 June 2024)

No.	Pos.	Nation	Player
—	FW	TUR	Koray Kılınç (at Ankara Keçiörengücü until 30 June 2024)

== Transfers ==
=== In ===
Pos.	Player	Transferred from	Fee	Date	Source
DF	(Turkey) Kaan Bengi	(Germany) Bayern Munich	Free	8 September 2023	

=== Out ===
Pos.	Player	Transferred to	Fee	Date	Source

== Pre-season and friendlies ==
Win Draw Loss

16 July 2023 Friendly	Hatayspor	1–2	Bodrum

28 July 2023 Friendly	Samsunspor	4–0	Bodrum

31 July 2023 Friendly	Kocaelispor	1–2	Bodrum

== Competitions ==
=== Overall record ===
Competition	First match	Last match	Starting round	Final position	Record							
Competition	First match	Last match	Starting round	Final position	Pld	W	D	L	GF	GA	GD	Win %
TFF First League	12 August 2023	11 May 2024	Matchday 1	4th	34	15	12	7	43	22	+21	44.12
Promotion play-offs	16 May 2024	30 May 2024	Quarter-finals		3	1	2	0	3	1	+2	33.33
Turkish Cup	6 December 2023	17 January 2024	Third round	Fifth round	2	1	0	1	2	2	+0	50.00
Total					39	17	14	8	48	25	+23	43.59

Source: Soccerway

=== TFF First League ===
==== League table ====
Pos	Team	Pld	W	D	L	GF	GA	GD	Pts	Qualification or relegation
2	Göztepe (P)	34	21	7	6	60	20	+40	70	Promotion to the Süper Lig
3	Sakaryaspor	34	17	9	8	50	35	+15	60	Qualification for the Süper Lig Playoff Final
4	Bodrum (O, P)	34	15	12	7	43	22	+21	57	Qualification for the Süper Lig Playoff Quarter Finals
5	Çorum	34	16	8	10	55	36	+19	56	Qualification for the Süper Lig Playoff Quarter Finals
6	Kocaelispor	34	16	7	11	48	41	+7	55	Qualification for the Süper Lig Playoff Quarter Finals

Updated to match(es) played on 11 May 2024. Source: TFF
Rules for classification: 1) Points; 2) Head-to-head points; 3) Head-to-head goal difference; 4) Head-to-head goals scored; 5) Goal difference; 6) Goals scored
(O) Play-off winners; (P) Promoted

==== Results summary ====
Overall								Home						Away					
Pld	W	D	L	GF	GA	GD	Pts	W	D	L	GF	GA	GD	W	D	L	GF	GA	GD
34	15	12	7	43	22	+21	57	10	5	2	28	7	+21	5	7	5	15	15	0

==== Results by round ====
Round	1	2	3	4	5	6	7	8	9	10	11	12	13	14	15	16	17	18	19	20	21	22	23	24	25	26	27	28	29	30	31	32	33	34
Ground	A	H	A	H	A	A	H	A	H	A	H	A	H	A	H	A	H	H	A	H	A	H	H	A	H	A	H	A	H	A	H	A	H	A
Result	W	D	L	W	W	D	W	L	W	L	W	D	L	W	D	D	W	W	L	W	W	D	W	L	L	D	D	W	D	D	W	D	W	D
Position																																		

A = Away; H = Home; W = Win; D = Draw; L = Loss

==== Matches ====
The league fixtures were unveiled on 30 June 2023.

12 August 2023 1	Giresunspor	0–1	Bodrum

19 August 2023 2	Bodrum	0–0	Erzurumspor	Bodrum
				Stadium: Bodrum District Stadium

26 August 2023 3	Gençlerbirliği	1–0	Bodrum

3 September 2023 4	Bodrum	4–0	Ümraniyespor	Bodrum
				Stadium: Bodrum District Stadium

18 September 2023 5	Sakaryaspor	0–2	Bodrum

25 September 2023 6	Altay	1–1	Bodrum

1 October 2023 7	Bodrum	2–1	Çorum	Bodrum
				Stadium: Bodrum District Stadium

7 October 2023 8	Eyüpspor	3–0	Bodrum

22 October 2023 9	Bodrum	2–1	Bandırmaspor	Bodrum
				Stadium: Bodrum District Stadium

28 October 2023 10	Boluspor	2–1	Bodrum

5 November 2023 11	Bodrum	2–0	Manisa	Bodrum
				Stadium: Bodrum District Stadium

11 November 2023 12	Ankara Keçiörengücü	1–1	Bodrum

25 November 2023 13	Bodrum	0–1	Adanaspor	Bodrum
				Stadium: Bodrum District Stadium

2 December 2023 14	Şanlıurfaspor	0–2	Bodrum

9 December 2023 15	Bodrum	1–1	Tuzlaspor	Bodrum
				Stadium: Bodrum District Stadium

19 December 2023 16	Kocaelispor	1–1	Bodrum

24 December 2023 17	Bodrum	3–0	Göztepe	Bodrum
				Stadium: Bodrum District Stadium

13 January 2024 18	Bodrum	4–0	Giresunspor	Bodrum
				Stadium: Bodrum District Stadium

20 January 2024 19	Erzurumspor	1–0	Bodrum

28 January 2024 20	Bodrum	1–0	Gençlerbirliği	Bodrum
				Stadium: Bodrum District Stadium

3 February 2024 21	Ümraniyespor	1–2	Bodrum

10 February 2024 22	Bodrum	0–0	Sakaryaspor	Bodrum
				Stadium: Bodrum District Stadium

18 February 2024 23	Bodrum	3–0	Altay	Bodrum
				Stadium: Bodrum District Stadium

24 February 2024 24	Çorum	2–1	Bodrum	Çorum

2 March 2024 25	Bodrum	0–1	Eyüpspor	Bodrum
				Stadium: Bodrum District Stadium

9 March 2024 26	Bandırmaspor	0–0	Bodrum

17 March 2024 27	Bodrum	1–1	Boluspor	Bodrum
				Stadium: Bodrum District Stadium

2 April 2024 28	Manisa	0–1	Bodrum	Manisa
20:30				Stadium: Manisa 19 Mayıs Stadium

6 April 2024 29	Bodrum	0–0	Ankara Keçiörengücü	Bodrum
13:30				Stadium: Bodrum District Stadium

15 April 2024 30	Adanaspor	1–1	Bodrum	Adana
20:00				Stadium: New Adana Stadium

21 April 2024 31	Bodrum	2–1	Şanlıurfaspor	Bodrum
13:30				Stadium: Bodrum District Stadium

28 April 2024 32	Tuzlaspor	0–0	Bodrum	Istanbul
16:00				Stadium: Sancaktepe Stadium

5 May 2024 33	Bodrum	3–0	Kocaelispor	Bodrum
16:00				Stadium: Bodrum District Stadium

11 May 2024 34	Göztepe	1–1	Bodrum	İzmir
16:00				Stadium: Gürsel Aksel Stadium

==== Promotion play-offs ====
16 May 2024 Quarter-finals	Bodrum	2–0	Boluspor	Bodrum
				Stadium: Bodrum District Stadium

20 May 2024 Semi-finals; First leg	Çorum	1–1	Bodrum	Çorum
				Stadium: Çorum City Stadium

24 May 2024 Semi-finals; Second leg	Bodrum	0–0 (1–1 agg.) (5–4 p)	Çorum	Bodrum
	Mohammed (yellow card) 67'; Brazão (yellow card) 90+3'; Dumanlı (yellow card) 105+8'		Verheydt (yellow card) 17'; Geraldo (yellow card) 38'; Yazgan (yellow card) 65'; Aydın (yellow card) 74' (yellow-red card) 105+5'; Ologo (yellow card) 105+8'	Stadium: Bodrum District Stadium

30 May 2024 Final	Sakaryaspor	v	Bodrum	Adapazarı
20:00				Stadium: New Sakarya Atatürk Stadium

=== Turkish Cup ===
6 December 2023 Fourth round	Bodrum	2–1	Menemen FK	Bodrum
13:00		Report		Stadium: Bodrum District Stadium

17 January 2024 Fifth round	Gaziantep	1–0	Bodrum	Gaziantep
				Stadium: Gaziantep Stadium
