= 2022–23 TFF 1. Lig =

22nd season of TFF 1. Lig

TFF 1. Lig
- Season: 2022–23
- Dates: 5 August 2022 – 21 May 2023
- Champions: Samsunspor (7th title)
- Promoted: Samsunspor; Çaykur Rizespor; Pendikspor
- Relegated: Altınordu; Denizlispor
- Matches: 346
- Goals: 926 (2.68 per match)
- Top goalscorer: Marco Paixão (21 goals)
- Biggest home win: Bodrumspor 5–0 Sakaryaspor (8 October 2022); Göztepe 5–0 Denizlispor (29 October 2022); Samsunspor 5–0 Denizlispor (3 December 2022); Samsunspor 5–0 Bandırmaspor (13 March 2023)
- Biggest away win: Yeni Malatyaspor 0–4 Çaykur Rizespor (3 September 2022); Boluspor 1–5 Samsunspor (28 March 2023); Bandırmaspor 0–4 Bodrumspor (29 March 2023); Denizlispor 0–4 Ankara Keçiörengücü (15 April 2023)
- Highest scoring: Çaykur Rizespor 5–3 Gençlerbirliği (23 April 2023)
- Longest winning run: Samsunspor (7 matches)
- Longest unbeaten run: Samsunspor (20 matches)
- Longest winless run: Gençlerbirliği (17 matches)
- Longest losing run: Yeni Malatyaspor (15 matches)

The 2022–23 TFF 1. Lig was the 22nd season since the league was established in 2001 and 60th season of the second-level football league of Turkey since its establishment in 1963–64.

== Teams ==
- Ankaragücü, Ümraniyespor and İstanbulspor promoted to 2022–23 Süper Lig.
- Çaykur Rizespor, Altay, Göztepe and Yeni Malatyaspor relegated from 2021–22 Süper Lig.
- Bodrumspor, Pendikspor and Sakaryaspor promoted from 2021–22 TFF Second League.
- Kocaelispor, Bursaspor, Menemenspor and Balıkesirspor relegated to 2022–23 TFF Second League.
- Altınordu and Denizlispor relegated to 2023–24 TFF Second League.

=== Stadiums and locations ===
Location of teams in 2022–23 TFF 1. Lig

Team	Home city	Stadium	Capacity
Adanaspor	Adana	New Adana Stadium	33,543
Altay	İzmir (Alsancak)	Alsancak Mustafa Denizli Stadium	14,000
Altınordu	İzmir (Alsancak)	Bornova Aziz Kocaoğlu Stadium	9,138
Ankara Keçiörengücü	Ankara (Keçiören)	Ankara Aktepe Stadium	4,883
Bandırmaspor	Bandırma	17 Eylül Stadium	12,725
Bodrumspor	Muğla (Bodrum)	Bodrum İlçe Stadium	4,563
Boluspor	Bolu	Bolu Atatürk Stadium	8,456
Çaykur Rizespor	Rize	Yeni Rize Şehir Stadı	15,332
Altaş Denizlispor	Denizli	Denizli Atatürk Stadium	18,745
Erzurumspor	Erzurum	Kazım Karabekir Stadium	21,374
Eyüpspor	Istanbul, (Eyüp)	Eyüp Stadium	2,500
Gençlerbirliği	Ankara (Yenimahalle)	Eryaman Stadium	20,560
Göztepe	İzmir (Göztepe)	Gürsel Aksel Stadium	25,035
Manisa	Manisa	Manisa 19 Mayıs Stadium	16,066
Pendikspor	Istanbul, (Pendik)	Pendik Stadium	2,650
Sakaryaspor	Sakarya (Adapazarı)	New Sakarya Stadium	28,154
Samsunspor	Samsun	Samsun Stadium	33,919
Tuzlaspor	Istanbul, (Tuzla)	Tuzla Belediye Stadium	1,600
Yeni Malatyaspor	Malatya	New Malatya Stadium	27,044

=== Personnel and sponsorship ===
Team	Head coach	Captain	Kit manufacturer	Sponsor
Adanaspor		(Morocco) Youssef Aït Bennasser	Joma	
Altay	(Turkey) Tuna Üzümcü	(Turkey) İbrahim Öztürk	Nike	Bluedoor
Altınordu	(Turkey) Hasan Özer	(Turkey) Ahmet İlhan Özek	Capelli Sport	Petrol Ofisi
Ankara Keçiörengücü	(Turkey) Tacettin Bakacak	(Turkey) Aykut Demir	Nike	Ayhanlar Otogaz
Bey Çimento Bandırmaspor	(Turkey) Sami Uğurlu	(Turkey) Kerim Avcı	Umbro	Bey Çimeto
Bodrumspor	(Turkey) İsmet Taşdemir	(Turkey) Yekta Kurtuluş	Puma	Bitci
Boluspor		(Turkey) Tugay Kaçar	Adidas	Dyorex
Çaykur Rizespor	(Turkey) Bülent Korkmaz	(Turkey) Emirhan Topçu	Umbro	Çaykur
Altaş Denizlispor	(Turkey) Bülent Ertuğrul	(Turkey) Gökhan Süzen	nadd	Rams
Erzurumspor	(Turkey) Hakan Kutlu	(Turkey) Mustafa Yumlu	Nike	
Eyüpspor	(Turkey) Arda Turan	(Netherlands) Ryan Babel	Puma	Green Motion Car Rental
Gençlerbirliği	(Turkey) Sinan Kaloğlu	(Turkey) Abdullah Durak	Nike	Kutup
Göztepe	(Austria) Ekrem Dağ	(Turkey) Yasin Öztekin	Umbro	
Manisa	(Turkey) Yalçın Koşukavak	(Turkey) Nizamettin Çalışkan	Puma	ECA
Pendikspor	(Turkey) Osman Özköylü	(Turkey) Erdem Özgenç	Puma	Siltaş Yapı
Sakaryaspor	(Turkey) Taner Taşkın	(Turkey) Oğuz Kocabal	Diadora	Bitexen
Yılport Samsunspor	(Turkey) Hüseyin Eroğlu	(Turkey) Osman Çelik	Diadora	Yılport
Tuzlaspor	(Turkey) Emre Morgil	(Slovenia) Rajko Rotman	Puma	Bitexen
Yeni Malatyaspor	(Turkey) Yılmaz Vural	(Turkey) Buğra Çağıran	Uhlsport	

=== Foreign players ===
Club	Player 1	Player 2	Player 3	Player 4	Player 5	Player 6	Player 7	Player 8	Player 9	Player 10	Former Players
Adanaspor	(Burkina Faso) Adolphe Belem	(Nigeria) Papa Daniel	(Portugal) Pedro Nuno								(Benin) Yohan Roche (The Gambia) Lamin Jallow (Ghana) Samuel Tetteh (Mali) Hadi Sacko (Morocco) Youssef Aït Bennasser
Altay Izmir	(Iran) Mohammad Naderi	(Portugal) Marco Paixão	(Sweden) Eric Björkander								(Ivory Coast) Serge Aka
Altınordu											
Ankara Keçiörengücü	(Albania) Jurgen Bardhi	(Brazil) Anderson	(France) Malaly Dembélé	(France) Rashad Muhammed	(The Gambia) Lamin Jallow	(Mali) Aly Mallé	(Nigeria) Cristian Innocent	(Nigeria) Patrick Eze	(Senegal) Moustapha Camara		(Albania) Bekim Balaj (Albania) Uerdi Mara (Iran) Ali Babaei (Nigeria) Ibrahim Olawoyin
Bandırmaspor	(Benin) Cebio Soukou	(Democratic Republic of the Congo) Rémi Mulumba	(Ghana) Samuel Tetteh	(Greece) Georgios Koutroumpis	(Greece) Ioannis Gelios	(Guinea) Sékou Camara	(Poland) Mateusz Hołownia	(Serbia) Ivan Šaponjić	(Serbia) Nikola Terzić		(Democratic Republic of the Congo) Isaac Tshibangu (France) Malaly Dembélé (Greece) Dimitrios Manos
Bodrumspor	(Albania) Omar Imeri	(Ghana) Musah Mohammed	(Indonesia) Ronaldo Kwateh	(Jamaica) Dever Orgill	(North Macedonia) Adis Jahović	(Nigeria) Aminu Umar	(Portugal) Diogo Sousa				(Serbia) Dejan Dražić
Boluspor	(Albania) Dejvi Bregu	(Brazil) Negueba	(Democratic Republic of the Congo) Joel Ngandu Kayamba	(Guinea) Guy-Michel Landel	(Guinea) Naby Oularé	(Ivory Coast) Abdoulaye Diarrassouba	(Moldova) Veaceslav Posmac	(Senegal) Ibrahima Baldé	(South Africa) Dino Ndlovu		(Albania) Gentian Selmani (Ivory Coast) Guy Serge Yaméogo (Slovenia) Jakob Novak
Çaykur Rizespor	(Bosnia and Herzegovina) Srđan Grahovac	(Brazil) Amilton	(Brazil) Ronaldo Mendes	(Cameroon) John Mary	(Democratic Republic of the Congo) Yannick Bolasie	(Ghana) Haqi Osman	(Nigeria) Azubuike Okechukwu	(Nigeria) Ibrahim Olawoyin	(Uganda) Farouk Miya		(Albania) Enriko Papa (Curaçao) Anthony van den Hurk
Denizlispor	(France) Léo Schwechlen	(Gabon) Kévin Mayi	(Morocco) Ismaïl Aissati								(Ivory Coast) Brice Dja Djédjé
Erzurumspor	(Angola) Estrela	(Kosovo) Herolind Shala	(Morocco) Zakarya Bergdich	(Netherlands) Mikhail Rosheuvel	(Nigeria) Aaron Olanare						(Czech Republic) Martin Hašek
Eyüpspor	(Brazil) Luccas Claro	(The Gambia) Pa Dibba	(Luxembourg) Olivier Thill	(Netherlands) Ryan Babel	(Nigeria) Francis Ezeh	(Venezuela) Yonathan Del Valle					(Nigeria) Emeka Eze (Nigeria) Jesse Sekidika (Senegal) Stéphane Badji
Gençlerbirliği	(Croatia) Ivan Ikić	(Ecuador) Jaime Ayoví	(Guinea) Sekou Bangoura	(Madagascar) Thomas Fontaine	(Mauritania) Souleymane Doukara	(Morocco) Moha Rharsalla	(Nigeria) Chukwuma Akabueze	(Portugal) Tiago Rodrigues	(Romania) Gabriel Torje		(Ukraine) Dmytro Hrechyshkin (Ukraine) Oleksandr Byelyayev
Göztepe	(Austria) Marko Kvasina	(Belgium) Dino Arslanagić	(Bosnia and Herzegovina) Ajdin Hasić	(Bosnia and Herzegovina) Marko Mihojević	(Democratic Republic of the Congo) Michee Ngalina	(England) Romal Palmer	(France) Aliou Traoré	(Germany) Lukas Gottwalt	(Ivory Coast) Bayéré Junior	(Nigeria) Kenneth Mamah	(Ghana) Isaac Atanga (Slovenia) David Tijanić
Manisa	(Canada) Ballou Tabla	(Chile) Junior Fernandes	(France) Alioune Ba	(France) Marvin Gakpa	(Germany) Edgar Prib	(Germany) Yannick Stark	(Kosovo) David Domgjoni	(Mali) Demba Diallo			(Albania) Eros Grezda
Pendikspor	(Brazil) Thuram	(Morocco) Adrien Regattin	(Suriname) Leandro Kappel	(Syria) Aias Aosman							(Hungary) Nemanja Nikolić (Hungary) Roland Ugrai (Senegal) Khaly Thiam
Sakaryaspor	(Albania) Odise Roshi	(Bosnia and Herzegovina) Deni Milošević	(Bulgaria) Zdravko Dimitrov	(Burundi) Patrick Banza	(Democratic Republic of the Congo) Kabongo Kasongo	(Ghana) Isaac Donkor	(Mali) Hadi Sacko	(Poland) Michał Nalepa	(Ukraine) Dmytro Hrechyshkin		(England) Kaiyne Woolery (Israel) Guy Hadida (Ukraine) Artem Kravets
Samsunspor	(Brazil) Douglas Tanque	(England) Kadeem Harris	(France) Gaëtan Laura	(Ivory Coast) Moryké Fofana	(Ivory Coast) Moussa Guel	(Poland) Jakub Szumski	(Portugal) Tomané				(Brazil) Fernando Boldrin (Ivory Coast) Ismaël Diomandé (Lithuania) Arvydas Novikovas
Tuzlaspor	(Belgium) Aaron Leya Iseka	(Cameroon) Abdoulaye Yahaya	(Democratic Republic of the Congo) Giannelli Imbula	(Democratic Republic of the Congo) Kévin Nzuzi Mata	(Ghana) Philip Awuku	(Guinea) Abdoulaye Cissé	(Niger) Amadou Moutari	(Nigeria) James Adeniyi	(Nigeria) Sikiru Olatunbosun	(Slovenia) Rajko Rotman	(Austria) Stefan Savić (Ivory Coast) Mory Kone
Yeni Malatyaspor	(Burundi) Jospin Nshimirimana	(Ghana) Godfred Donsah									(Ghana) Haqi Osman (Ghana) Philip Awuku (Mali) Aly Mallé

== League table ==
Pos	Team	Pld	W	D	L	GF	GA	GD	Pts	Qualification or relegation
1	Samsunspor (C, P)	36	23	9	4	70	26	+44	78	Promotion to the Süper Lig
2	Çaykur Rizespor (P)	36	18	14	4	64	35	+29	68	Promotion to the Süper Lig
3	Pendikspor (O, P)	36	19	10	7	65	36	+29	67	Qualification for the Süper Lig Playoff Final
4	Bodrumspor	36	18	8	10	55	34	+21	62 (Note: Head-to-head points: Bodrumspor 5–0 Sakaryaspor, Sakaryaspor 2–1 Bodrumspor; Eyüpspor 2–1 Sakaryaspor, Sakaryaspor 2–0 Eyüpspor; Bodrumspor 3–0 Eyüpspor, Eyüpspor 1–0 Bodrumspor)	Qualification for the Süper Lig Playoff Quarter Finals
5	Sakaryaspor	36	20	2	14	59	47	+12	62	Qualification for the Süper Lig Playoff Quarter Finals
6	Eyüpspor	36	18	8	10	40	30	+10	62	Qualification for the Süper Lig Playoff Quarter Finals
7	Göztepe (Note: Göztepe vs. Altay was suspended following an attack on a goalkeeper in the 22nd minute. On 9 December 2022, TFF stated that both sides would be considered defeated 3−0. Also, Altay have been deducted 3 points by the Club Licensing Board for failing to meet the licensing requirements.)	36	17	9	10	45	31	+14	60	Qualification for the Süper Lig Playoff Quarter Finals
8	Manisa	36	15	11	10	53	47	+6	56 (Note: Head-to-head points: Manisa 0–0 Ankara Keçiörengücü, Ankara Keçiörengücü 0–3 Manisa)	
9	Keçiörengücü	36	16	8	12	59	47	+12	56	
10	Bandırmaspor	36	15	10	11	55	58	−3	55	
11	Boluspor	36	14	10	12	44	46	−2	52	
12	Altay (Note: Göztepe v. Altay was suspended following an attack on a goalkeeper in the 22nd minute. On 9 December 2022, TFF stated that both sides would be considered defeated 3−0.)	36	11	10	15	45	48	−3	40	
13	Erzurumspor (Note: Erzurumspor have been deducted 3 points by the Club Licensing Board for failing to meet the licensing requirements.)	36	11	9	16	43	48	−5	39	
14	Tuzlaspor	36	11	5	20	42	52	−10	38 (Note: Head-to-head points: Gençlerbirliği 1–2 Tuzlaspor, Tuzlaspor 1–0 Gençlerbirliği)	
15	Gençlerbirliği	36	10	8	18	46	55	−9	38	
16	Altınordu (R)	36	9	8	19	41	57	−16	35	Relegation to the TFF Second League
17	Adanaspor (Note: Adanaspor withdrew from the league following the 2023 Turkey–Syria earthquake and were not relegated at the end of the season.)	36	6	7	23	32	76	−44	25	Withdrew
18	Denizlispor (Note: Denizlispor have been deducted 3 points by the Club Licensing Board for failing to meet the licensing requirements.) (R)	36	7	5	24	35	67	−32	23	Relegation to the TFF Second League
19	Yeni Malatyaspor (Note: Yeni Malatyaspor have been deducted 3 points by the Club Licensing Board for failing to meet the licensing requirements. Yeni Malatyaspor withdrew from the league following the 2023 Turkey–Syria earthquake and were not relegated at the end of the season.)	36	4	7	25	22	81	−59	16	Withdrew

Source: TFF
Rules for classification: 1) Points; 2) Head-to-head points; 3) Head-to-head goal difference; 4) Head-to-head goals scored; 5) Goal difference; 6) Goals scored
(C) Champions; (O) Play-off winners; (P) Promoted; (R) Relegated

=== Positions by round ===
The table lists the positions of teams after each week of matches. In order to preserve chronological evolvements, any postponed matches are not included to the round at which they were originally scheduled, but added to the full round they were played immediately afterwards.

Team ╲ Round	1	2	3	4	5	6	7	8	9	10	11	12	13	14	15	16	17	18	19	20	21	22	23	24	25	26	27	28	29	30	31	32	33	34	35	36	37	38
Samsunspor	2	2	6	10	11	7	9	5	8	8	6	4	2	4	6	2	5	2	2	2	2	1	2	2	2	1	1	1	1	1	1	1	1	1	1	1	1	1
Çaykur Rizespor	10	11	14	9	10	13	10	6	7	7	8	7	7	5	2	3	3	5	7	7	6	6	4	7	6	5	4	3	3	3	4	2	2	2	2	2	2	2
Pendikspor	13	6	3	5	7	8	4	3	5	3	5	8	4	2	3	4	2	3	6	6	5	5	5	4	3	4	3	5	5	5	5	5	3	3	3	4	3	3
Bodrumspor	1	1	1	1	1	2	5	4	3	2	4	2	5	7	8	6	6	4	3	3	4	3	3	3	5	7	7	7	7	7	6	7	7	6	7	7	5	4
Sakaryaspor	17	8	5	7	5	6	3	9	6	6	9	10	11	9	10	10	10	10	10	9	9	8	7	6	7	6	6	4	4	4	3	4	5	5	4	3	4	5
Eyüpspor	4	4	2	6	4	1	2	1	2	1	1	1	1	1	1	1	1	1	1	1	1	2	1	1	1	2	2	2	2	2	2	3	4	4	5	5	7	6
Göztepe	5	5	10	12	13	11	12	14	15	14	10	12	10	13	13	13	12	11	11	11	11	10	11	11	10	9	11	11	9	9	8	6	6	7	6	6	6	7
Manisa	16	18	13	8	8	9	6	10	11	10	7	6	8	8	7	8	9	8	9	10	10	11	10	10	8	8	8	8	8	8	9	11	10	10	8	10	9	8
Ankara Keçiörengücü	9	15	8	3	6	3	1	2	1	4	2	3	6	3	4	5	4	6	4	4	3	4	6	5	4	3	5	6	6	6	7	8	8	8	10	9	8	9
Bandırmaspor	14	7	4	2	2	5	8	8	10	9	11	9	9	11	9	9	8	7	5	8	7	7	8	9	11	11	10	10	11	11	11	10	9	9	9	8	10	10
Boluspor	3	9	9	4	3	4	7	7	4	5	3	5	3	6	5	7	7	9	8	5	8	9	9	8	9	10	9	9	10	10	10	9	11	11	11	11	11	11
Altay	19	19	19	18	15	15	16	17	16	16	15	14	12	10	11	11	11	12	12	14	14	13	14	14	14	13	13	14	12	12	13	13	13	14	13	13	13	12
Erzurumspor	12	12	12	15	17	17	15	12	12	15	16	17	14	15	15	15	14	13	13	15	15	15	15	15	15	15	15	13	14	14	14	14	15	13	15	16	15	13
Tuzlaspor	11	17	18	14	9	10	11	11	9	11	12	13	15	14	14	14	15	15	14	13	13	14	13	13	13	12	12	12	13	13	12	12	12	12	12	12	12	14
Gençlerbirliği	7	3	7	11	12	14	14	15	17	17	18	18	18	18	18	18	19	19	19	19	19	18	17	17	16	16	17	17	17	17	17	16	16	16	16	14	14	15
Altınordu	6	14	15	16	16	16	17	16	13	12	13	15	16	16	16	16	17	17	18	16	16	16	16	16	18	18	16	16⁣	16⁣	15	15	15	14	15	14	15	16	16
Adanaspor	8	10	11	13	14	12	13	13	14	13	14	11	13	12	12	12	13	14	15	12	12	12	12	12	12	14	14	15	15	16⁣	16⁣	17⁣	17⁣	17⁣	17⁣	17⁣	17⁣	17⁣
Denizlispor	15	13	16	17	19	19	19	19	19	19	19	19	19	19	19	19	18	18	17	18	18	19	18	18	17	17	18	18	18	18	18	18	18	18	18	18	18	18
Yeni Malatyaspor	18	16	17	19	18	18	18	18	18	18	17	16	17	17	17	17	16	16	16	17	17	17	19	19⁣	19⁣	19⁣	19⁣	19⁣	19⁣	19⁣	19⁣	19⁣	19⁣	19⁣	19⁣	19⁣	19⁣	19⁣

Champion, Promotion to Süper Lig
Promotion to Süper Lig
Promotion to Süper Lig Play-off final
Play-off quarter finals
TFF Second League

Source: TFF

== Results ==
Home \ Away	ADA	ALT	ATO	AKG	BAN	BOD	BOL	RİZ	DEN	EFK	EYÜ	GEN	GÖZ	MFK	PEN	SAK	SAM	TUZ	YMA
Adanaspor	—	1–1	2–1	0–3 (Note: Awarded)	1–1	1–2	0–3	2–0	2–3	0–3	0–3	2–1	2–2	0–3	3–2	0–3	0–3	1–1	2–2
Altay	0–1	—	1–2	1–3	1–1	2–0	5–1	0–2	3–0	1–1	0–0	1–0	1–1	1–3	1–4	3–1	0–2	3–1	3–0
Altınordu	3–0	0–2	—	1–4	3–3	0–2	1–1	0–0	5–2	0–1	1–2	2–1	0–1	1–3	1–1	0–2	2–1	2–1	0–3
Ankara Keçiörengücü	1–0	1–1	4–0	—	3–1	1–3	1–1	1–1	2–0	3–2	2–1	2–2	2–3	0–3	0–3	2–1	1–1	0–1	3–0
Bandırmaspor	3–0	2–1	1–0	2–2	—	0–4	2–1	1–1	1–4	2–4	0–1	1–1	2–1	2–1	1–0	3–2	0–0	4–1	0–2
Bodrumspor	3–3	2–0	1–0	1–2	1–1	—	1–0	1–2	1–0	0–0	3–0	2–0	1–1	1–1	2–2	5–0	0–0	1–2	3–1
Boluspor	1–0	0–0	1–1	3–1	2–2	1–4	—	0–2	3–0	3–1	2–0	1–2	1–0	3–1	1–3	1–0	1–5	0–0	1–0
Çaykur Rizespor	3–0	3–1	0–0	1–1	0–0	2–0	1–0	—	3–1	3–1	0–0	5–3	0–2	4–2	1–1	2–1	1–1	4–2	5–1
Denizlispor	3–0	2–1	1–2	0–4	0–1	0–0	1–2	0–0	—	0–2	0–1	2–2	0–2	1–1	0–1	0–1	1–2	4–3	3–0
Erzurumspor	3–2	2–4	2–1	0–1	1–2	1–2	2–0	1–1	1–0	—	0–1	0–1	0–1	1–3	0–0	0–1	2–2	1–2	3–0
Eyüpspor	1–0	0–1	2–1	2–1	4–1	1–0	0–0	0–1	1–0	1–1	—	0–2	1–0	4–0	1–1	2–1	1–4	2–0	3–2
Gençlerbirliği	3–0	0–0	3–3	0–2	2–5	2–1	5–1	1–3	0–0	1–2	0–2	—	1–0	1–3	1–2	2–1	0–1	1–2	3–0
Göztepe	3–0	Susp.	1–0	2–1	3–1	0–1	1–1	3–3	5–0	1–1	1–0	0–0	—	1–0	1–1	0–1	1–0	0–2	3–0
Manisa	3–2	1–1	2–2	0–0	0–1	2–1	0–1	2–2	3–2	0–0	0–1	2–1	1–1	—	1–5	2–1	1–1	1–0	2–2
Pendikspor	3–0	1–0	2–1	2–1	2–1	3–0	0–1	3–2	2–1	1–1	0–0	0–1	3–0	0–0	—	3–1	0–2	3–2	3–0
Sakaryaspor	3–2	1–2	2–1	2–0	4–2	2–1	1–1	1–1	2–1	2–0	2–0	2–1	0–1	2–0	3–2	—	0–1	2–0	3–1
Samsunspor	2–1	2–1	2–0	4–1	5–0	0–1	2–2	2–0	5–0	2–1	1–1	2–0	1–0	0–1	4–2	3–2	—	1–0	1–1
Tuzlaspor	0–1	4–2	0–1	1–3	0–2	0–1	1–0	0–1	3–0	4–1	0–0	1–0	0–2	1–2	1–1	2–3	1–2	—	0–0
Yeni Malatyaspor	1–1	0–0	0–3	1–0	0–3	1–3	0–3	0–4	0–3	0–1	2–1	2–2	0–1	0–3	0–3	0–3	0–3	0–3	—

Source: TFF
Legend: Blue = home team win; Yellow = draw; Red = away team win.

== Promotion Playoffs ==
=== Bracket ===
Quarterfinals
4	Bodrumspor	3
7	Göztepe	1
5	Sakaryaspor	0
6	Eyüpspor (a.e.t.)	1

Semifinal
4	Bodrumspor	0	2	2
6	Eyüpspor	1	0	1

Final
3	Pendikspor	2
4	Bodrumspor	1

=== Quarterfinals ===
Team 1	Score	Team 2
Bodrumspor	3–1	Göztepe
Sakaryaspor	0–1 (a.e.t.)	Eyüpspor

26 May 2023	Bodrumspor	3–1	Göztepe	Bodrum
17:00 TRT (UTC+3)	Şen 16'; Köybaşı 45+1' (o.g.); Umar 90+9'	Report	Nukan 86'	Stadium: Bodrum İlçe Stadium; Referee: Arda Kardeşler

26 May 2023	Sakaryaspor	0–1 (a.e.t.)	Eyüpspor	Adapazarı
20:00 TRT (UTC+3)		Report	Öztürk 120+2'	Stadium: New Sakarya Atatürk Stadium; Referee: Zorbay Küçük

=== Semifinal ===
Team 1	Agg.	Team 2	1st leg	2nd leg
Bodrumspor	2–1	Eyüpspor	0-1	2–0

31 May 2023 First leg	Eyüpspor	1–0	Bodrumspor	Istanbul
20:00 TRT (UTC+3)	Pektemek 34'	Report		Stadium: Eyüp Stadium; Referee: Kadir Sağlam

4 June 2023 Second leg	Bodrumspor	2–0 (2–1 agg.)	Eyüpspor	Bodrum
16:00 TRT (UTC+3)	Ergün 90+1'; Özdamar 90+8'	Report		Stadium: Bodrum İlçe Stadium; Referee: Ali Şansalan

=== Final ===
Team 1	Score	Team 2
Pendikspor	2–1	Bodrumspor

8 June 2023	Pendikspor	2–1	Bodrumspor	Akhisar
20:00 TRT (UTC+3)	Regattin 29' (pen.); Thuram 31'	Report	Hatipoğlu 38' (o.g.)	Stadium: Spor Toto Akhisar Stadium; Referee: Abdulkadir Bitigen

== Statistics ==
=== Top goalscorers ===
As of matches played 21 May 2023

Top goalscorers
Rank	Player	Team	Goals
1	(Portugal) Marco Paixão	Altay	21
2	(Democratic Republic of the Congo) Kabongo Kasongo	Sakaryaspor	19
3	(Democratic Republic of the Congo) Yannick Bolasie	Çaykur Rizespor	17
4	(Brazil) Douglas Tanque	Samsunspor	15
5	(Turkey) Kenan Özer	Bodrumspor	14
6	(Turkey) Eren Tozlu	Erzurumspor	13
7	(Morocco) Adrien Regattin	Pendikspor	12
8	(Suriname) Leandro Kappel	Pendikspor	11
8	(Democratic Republic of the Congo) Gaëtan Laura	Samsunspor	11
8	(Turkey) Ahmet İlhan Özek	Altınordu	11
