= 2023–24 TFF 1. Lig =

23rd season of TFF 1. Lig

TFF 1. Lig
- Season: 2023–24
- Dates: 11 August 2023 – 11 May 2024
- Champions: Eyüpspor (1st title)
- Promoted: Eyüpspor; Göztepe; Bodrum
- Relegated: Tuzlaspor; Giresunspor; Altay
- Matches: 306
- Goals: 703 (2.3 per match)
- All statistics correct as of 11 May 2024.

The 2023–24 TFF 1. Lig, officially known as Trendyol 1. Lig for sponsorship reasons, is the 23rd season since the league was established in 2001 and 61st season of the second-level football league of Turkey since its establishment in 1963–64.

== Teams ==
- Samsunspor (ended their 3-year stint in 2nd tier), Çaykur Rizespor (ended their single stint in 2nd tier) and Pendikspor (also ended their single stint in 2nd tier) promoted to 2023–24 Süper Lig.
- Giresunspor (returned after a 2-year stint in top tier) and Ümraniyespor (returned after a single stint in top tier) relegated from 2022–23 Süper Lig.
- Çorum (promoted for the first time in their history to 2nd tier), Kocaelispor (promoted after a single year absence) and Şanlıurfaspor (promoted after a 6-year absence) promoted from 2022–23 TFF Second League.
- Altınordu (relegated after 9-years in 2nd tier) and Denizlispor (relegated after 2-years in 2nd tier) relegated to 2023–24 TFF Second League.

=== Stadiums and locations ===
Location of teams in 2023–24 TFF 1. Lig

Team	Home city/borough	Home province	Stadium	Capacity
Adanaspor	Adana	Adana	New Adana Stadium	33,543
Altay	Alsancak	İzmir	Alsancak Mustafa Denizli Stadium	14,000
Ankara Keçiörengücü	Keçiören	Ankara	Ankara Aktepe Stadium	4,883
Bandırmaspor	Bandırma	Balıkesir	17 Eylül Stadium	12,725
Bodrum	Bodrum	Muğla	Bodrum District Stadium	4,563
Boluspor	Bolu	Bolu	Bolu Atatürk Stadium	8,456
Çorum	Çorum	Çorum	Çorum City Stadium	15,000
Erzurumspor	Erzurum	Erzurum	Kazım Karabekir Stadium	21,374
Eyüpspor	Eyüp	Istanbul	Eyüp Stadium	2,500
Gençlerbirliği	Yenimahalle	Ankara	Eryaman Stadium	20,560
Giresunspor	Giresun	Giresun	Çotanak Sports Complex	22,028
Göztepe	Göztepe	İzmir	Gürsel Aksel Stadium	25,035
Kocaelispor	İzmit	Kocaeli	Kocaeli Stadium	34,712
Manisa	Manisa	Manisa	Manisa 19 Mayıs Stadium	16,066
Sakaryaspor	Adapazarı	Sakarya	New Sakarya Stadium	28,154
Şanlıurfaspor	Şanlıurfa	Şanlıurfa	Şanlıurfa 11 Nisan Stadium	28,965
Tuzlaspor	Tuzla	Istanbul	Tuzla Municipality Pitch	1,600
Ümraniyespor	Ümraniye	Istanbul	Ümraniye Municipality City Stadium	3,513
~~Yeni Malatyaspor~~	~~Malatya~~	~~Malatya~~	~~New Malatya Stadium~~	~~27,044~~

=== Personnel and sponsorship ===
Team	Head coach	Captain	Kit manufacturer	Sponsor
Adanaspor	(Turkey) Kemal Kılıç	(Turkey) Kubilay Aktaş	Joma	
Altay	(Turkey) Cüneyt Biçer	(Turkey) Özgür Özkaya	Adidas	Avek Otomotiv
Ankara Keçiörengücü	(Turkey) Tahsin Tam	(Turkey) Erkam Reşmen	Nike	
Bandırmaspor	(Turkey) Yusuf Şimşek	(Turkey) Doğan Can Davas	Umbro	Teksüt
Bodrum	(Turkey) İsmet Taşdemir	(Turkey) Erkan Değişmez	Puma	CIP Travel Agency
Boluspor	(Turkey) Yalçın Koşukavak	(Turkey) Çağlar Şahin Akbaba	New Balance	
Çorum	(Turkey) Serkan Özbalta	(Turkey) Ferhat Yazgan	Nike	Alagöz Holding
Erzurumspor	(Turkey) Hakan Kutlu	(Turkey) Mustafa Yumlu	Adidas	Şahsuvaroğlu
Eyüpspor	(Turkey) Arda Turan	(Turkey) Caner Erkin	Nike	Green Motion Car Rental
Gençlerbirliği	(Turkey) Sinan Kaloğlu	(Turkey) Uğur Akdemir	Nike	Trendyol
Giresunspor	(Turkey) Serhat Güller	(Turkey) Faruk Can Genç	Diadora	Bitexen
Göztepe	(Bulgaria) Stanimir Stoilov	(Turkey) İsmail Köybaşı	Umbro	Lemar
Kocaelispor	(Turkey) Mustafa Gürsel	(Turkey) Gökhan Değirmenci	Diadora	Yıldız Entegre
Manisa	(Turkey) Levent Devrim	(Turkey) Kaan Kanak	Puma	Noran
Sakaryaspor	(Turkey) Tuncay Şanlı	(Turkey) Burak Süleyman	Diadora	Remley
Şanlıurfaspor	(Turkey) Cihat Arslan	(Turkey) Mehmet Yiğit	Nike	Bitexen
Tuzlaspor	(Turkey) Mazhar Sevgi (interim)	(Turkey) Mehmet Taş	Puma	Bitexen
Ümraniyespor	(Turkey) Orhan Gençer	(Croatia) Tomislav Glumac	Nike	
Yeni Malatyaspor	Withdrew from the league			

=== Foreign players ===
Club	Player 1	Player 2	Player 3	Player 4	Player 5	Player 6	Player 7	Player 8	Player 9	Player 10	Former Players
Adanaspor	(Belgium) Jordan Lukaku	(Cameroon) Eric Ayuk	(Chile) Junior Fernandes	(France) Abdoulaye Dabo	(France) Oumar Diakité	(France) Rashad Muhammed	(France) Samuel Yépié Yépié	(New Zealand) Joe Champness	(Senegal) Amadou Ciss		(Ghana) Samuel Tetteh
Altay											(Portugal) Marco Paixão
Ankara Keçiörengücü	(Albania) Jurgen Bardhi	(France) Aliou Traoré	(France) Malaly Dembélé	(Nigeria) Christian Innocent	(Senegal) Moustapha Camara	(United States) Gboly Ariyibi					(Albania) Uerdi Mara (Gabon) Kévin Mayi
Bandırmaspor	(Benin) Cebio Soukou	(Democratic Republic of the Congo) Rémi Mulumba	(France) Marvin Gakpa	(Greece) Georgios Koutroumpis	(Guinea) Sékou Camara	(Mozambique) Mexer	(Netherlands) Navarone Foor	(Senegal) Dominique Badji	(Senegal) Moussa Djitté	(Suriname) Florian Jozefzoon	(England) Kadeem Harris (Greece) Ioannis Gelios (Paraguay) Raúl Bobadilla
Bodrum	(Albania) Omar Imeri	(Czech Republic) Ondřej Čelůstka	(Ghana) Haqi Osman	(Ghana) Musah Mohammed	(Indonesia) Ronaldo Kwateh	(Portugal) Diogo Sousa	(Portugal) Pedro Brazão				(Guinea-Bissau) Aldair Baldé (North Macedonia) Adis Jahović
Boluspor	(Azerbaijan) Vusal Isgandarli	(Brazil) Jefferson	(Guinea) Naby Oularé	(Ivory Coast) Abdoulaye Diarrassouba	(Moldova) Veaceslav Posmac	(North Macedonia) Daniel Avramovski	(Senegal) Idrissa Camara	(Serbia) Petar Gigić			(Democratic Republic of the Congo) Joel Kayamba (Guinea) Guy-Michel Landel (Republic of the Congo) Bevic Moussiti-Oko (Tunisia) Adel Bettaieb
Çorum	(Angola) Geraldo	(France) Loïck Landre	(Nigeria) Michael Ologo	(Netherlands) Thomas Verheydt	(Poland) Michał Nalepa	(Senegal) Zargo Touré					
Erzurumspor	(Angola) Estrela	(Kosovo) Herolind Shala	(Netherlands) Mikhail Rosheuvel								
Eyüpspor	(Angola) Fredy	(Belgium) Gianni Bruno	(Brazil) Luccas Claro	(Brazil) Thuram	(Ghana) Prince Ampem	(Morocco) Adrien Regattin	(Nigeria) Francis Ezeh	(Slovenia) Svit Sešlar	(Spain) Samuel Sáiz	(Uzbekistan) Jakhongir Urozov	(Mali) Aly Mallé (Netherlands) Ryan Babel
Gençlerbirliği	(Brazil) Amilton	(Cameroon) James Léa Siliki	(China) Wu Shaocong	(France) Gaëtan Laura	(Mali) Mustapha Yatabaré	(Mali) Sambou Yatabaré	(Nigeria) Chukwuma Akabueze	(Portugal) Tiago Rodrigues	(Republic of the Congo) Francis Nzaba	(Syria) Aias Aosman	(Nigeria) Olarenwaju Kayode
Giresunspor	(Senegal) Faustin Senghor										(Curaçao) Brandley Kuwas (Montenegro) Vukan Savićević
Göztepe	(Algeria) Billel Messaoudi	(Brazil) Héliton	(Brazil) Rômulo	(Denmark) Lasse Nielsen	(Nigeria) Anthony Dennis	(Nigeria) Kenneth Mamah	(Poland) Mateusz Lis	(Senegal) Ibrahima Diallo	(Senegal) Mame Biram Diouf	(Sweden) Pascal Lundqvist	(Austria) Marko Kvasina (Democratic Republic of the Congo) Michee Ngalina (England) Romal Palmer (France) Aliou Traoré (Slovenia) David Tijanić
Kocaelispor	(Azerbaijan) Ramil Sheydayev	(Croatia) Josip Vuković	(Georgia (country)) Davit Skhirtladze	(Georgia (country)) Giorgi Beridze	(Georgia (country)) Giorgi Kharaishvili	(Guinea) Ibrahima Fofana	(Portugal) Daniel Candeias	(Portugal) João Amaral	(Sweden) Christian Kouakou		(Azerbaijan) Serhat Tasdemir (Brazil) Douglas Tanque
Manisa	(Albania) Eduard Rroca	(Bosnia and Herzegovina) Andrej Đokanović	(Bosnia and Herzegovina) Daniel Graovac	(Brazil) Sandro Lima	(Cameroon) John Mary	(Kosovo) Jetmir Topalli	(Mali) Demba Diallo	(Norway) Mohamed Ofkir			(Canada) Ballou Tabla (France) Alioune Ba (France) Marvin Gakpa (Kosovo) David Domgjoni (Kosovo) Meriton Korenica
Sakaryaspor	(Albania) Odise Roshi	(Bulgaria) Zdravko Dimitrov	(Democratic Republic of the Congo) Kabongo Kasongo	(France) Nsana Simon	(Ghana) Isaac Donkor	(Mali) Hadi Sacko	(Slovenia) Rajko Rotman	(South Africa) Dino Ndlovu	(Venezuela) Yonathan Del Valle		(France) Rashad Muhammed (Poland) Michał Nalepa (Ukraine) Dmytro Hrechyshkin
Şanlıurfaspor	(Argentina) Emanuel Dening	(Bosnia and Herzegovina) Amar Begić	(England) Kadeem Harris	(Gabon) Michel Mboula	(Ghana) Godfred Donsah	(Guinea) Guy-Michel Landel	(Guinea-Bissau) Aldair Baldé	(Kyrgyzstan) Erzhan Tokotayev	(Portugal) Diogo Coelho	(Portugal) Marco Paixão	(Australia) Al Hassan Toure (Burundi) Jospin Nshimirimana (France) Pape-Alioune Ndiaye (Luxembourg) Olivier Thill (Uganda) Rogers Mato (Uruguay) Joaquín Ardaiz
Tuzlaspor	(Azerbaijan) Bekhtiyar Hasanalizade	(Germany) Streli Mamba	(Ghana) Philip Awuku	(Guinea) Sekou Bangoura	(Iran) Shahin Balijani	(Ivory Coast) William Togui	(Lithuania) Arvydas Novikovas	(Mali) Mahamadou Ba	(Nigeria) Aminu Umar	(North Macedonia) Luka Stankovski	(Cameroon) Abdoulaye Yahaya (Democratic Republic of the Congo) Giannelli Imbula (Democratic Republic of the Congo) Kévin Nzuzi Mata (Ivory Coast) Joseph Gnadou (Nigeria) James Adeniyi
Ümraniyespor	(Azerbaijan) Coşqun Diniyev	(Bulgaria) Strahil Popov	(Croatia) Tomislav Glumac	(Ghana) Isaac Cofie	(Guadeloupe) Dimitri Cavaré	(Ivory Coast) Daouda Bamba	(Morocco) Ayman Bouali	(Morocco) Nassim Titebah	(Nigeria) Toheeb Kosoko	(Serbia) Ivan Šaponjić	(Belgium) Victor Klonaridis (Albania) Dejvi Bregu

== League table ==
Pos	Team	Pld	W	D	L	GF	GA	GD	Pts	Qualification or relegation
1	Eyüpspor (P)	34	24	3	7	77	31	+46	75	Promotion to the Süper Lig
2	Göztepe (P)	34	21	7	6	60	20	+40	70	Promotion to the Süper Lig
3	Sakaryaspor	34	17	9	8	50	35	+15	60	Qualification for the Süper Lig Playoff Final
4	Bodrum (O, P)	34	15	12	7	43	22	+21	57	Qualification for the Süper Lig Playoff Quarter Finals
5	Çorum	34	16	8	10	55	36	+19	56	Qualification for the Süper Lig Playoff Quarter Finals
6	Kocaelispor	34	16	7	11	48	41	+7	55	Qualification for the Süper Lig Playoff Quarter Finals
7	Boluspor	34	15	8	11	33	35	−2	53	Qualification for the Süper Lig Playoff Quarter Finals
8	Gençlerbirliği	34	13	12	9	39	33	+6	51	
9	Bandırmaspor	34	13	11	10	49	32	+17	50	
10	Erzurumspor (Note: Erzurumspor have been deducted 3 points.)	34	12	11	11	30	34	−4	44	
11	Ümraniyespor	34	12	7	15	40	47	−7	43	
12	Manisa	34	9	13	12	40	40	0	40 (Note: Ranked on goal difference: Manisa (0), Ankara Keçiörengücü (–9).)	
13	Ankara Keçiörengücü	34	10	10	14	34	43	−9	40	
14	Adanaspor	34	11	6	17	28	45	−17	39	
15	Şanlıurfaspor	34	9	11	14	32	37	−5	38 (Note: Ranked on goal difference: Şanlıurfaspor (–5), Tuzlaspor (–12).)	
16	Tuzlaspor (R)	34	9	11	14	35	47	−12	38	Relegation to the TFF Second League
17	Altay (Note: Altay have been deducted 3 points by the Club Licensing Board for failing to meet the licensing requirements. Later, another 6 points have been deducted.) (R)	34	5	4	25	16	76	−60	10	Relegation to the TFF Second League
18	Giresunspor (Note: Giresunspor have been deducted 3 points.) (R)	34	2	4	28	16	71	−55	7	Relegation to the TFF Second League
19	Yeni Malatyaspor (Note: Yeni Malatyaspor withdrew from the league following the 2023 Turkey–Syria earthquake and will not be relegated at the end of the season.)	0	0	0	0	0	0	0	0	Withdrew

Updated to match(es) played on 11 May 2024. Source: TFF
Rules for classification: 1) Points; 2) Head-to-head points; 3) Head-to-head goal difference; 4) Head-to-head goals scored; 5) Goal difference; 6) Goals scored
(O) Play-off winners; (P) Promoted; (R) Relegated

== Results ==
Home \ Away	ADA	ALT	AKG	BAN	BOD	BOL	ÇFK	EFK	EYÜ	GEN	GİR	GÖZ	KOC	MFK	SAK	ŞAN	TUZ	ÜMR
Adanaspor	—	0–1	1–2	1–0	1–1	1–1	0–3	1–0	1–0	0–2	4–2	0–3	0–2	1–1	0–0	1–2	2–1	1–0
Altay	0–2	—	2–1	0–6	1–1	0–1	1–3	0–0	1–7	0–4	1–0	0–1	0–2	0–2	1–2	1–0	1–0	0–3
Ankara Keçiörengücü	1–0	1–1	—	1–3	1–1	1–2	1–2	0–2	0–1	2–1	3–1	0–1	2–2	1–1	1–3	2–0	0–2	4–2
Bandırmaspor	2–3	2–0	2–1	—	0–0	0–0	0–0	0–0	2–3	4–1	6–0	0–2	0–3	1–1	3–1	0–1	1–1	4–1
Bodrum	0–1	3–0	0–0	2–1	—	1–1	2–1	0–0	0–1	1–0	4–0	3–0	3–0	2–0	0–0	2–1	1–1	4–0
Boluspor	0–2	3–1	0–0	2–1	2–1	—	2–1	1–0	0–3	1–2	2–1	0–2	1–1	1–0	2–3	1–1	2–1	1–0
Çorum	2–0	3–0	2–3	0–0	2–1	2–0	—	4–1	2–3	0–1	0–2	1–1	1–1	4–3	1–0	1–1	2–1	0–1
Erzurumspor	1–0	4–0	0–1	1–1	1–0	1–0	2–1	—	0–4	1–1	2–1	3–2	0–0	1–2	0–0	2–0	1–0	1–1
Eyüpspor	4–1	4–1	2–0	0–1	3–0	0–0	0–1	3–0	—	1–0	3–1	0–3	2–0	2–1	3–2	4–0	4–0	2–0
Gençlerbirliği	1–1	3–0	1–1	0–1	1–0	0–0	0–0	2–0	1–3	—	1–0	0–3	2–0	1–1	3–1	1–1	0–2	2–1
Giresunspor	0–1	0–0	0–1	0–1	0–1	0–1	0–3	1–0	0–0	0–1	—	0–3	1–4	0–0	2–3	0–6	0–3	1–2
Göztepe	1–0	4–0	0–0	1–1	1–1	2–0	1–2	3–0	5–1	2–0	3–0	—	0–1	0–0	0–1	3–0	2–0	4–1
Kocaelispor	1–0	3–2	3–0	3–1	1–1	2–1	2–1	1–1	2–1	2–2	2–0	3–2	—	0–2	0–2	0–1	1–2	0–3
Manisa	1–1	3–0	0–0	0–2	0–1	1–0	2–2	0–2	2–2	1–1	2–0	0–1	2–1	—	1–1	1–1	4–0	3–2
Sakaryaspor	2–0	2–0	2–1	1–0	0–2	2–0	3–1	2–2	2–0	0–0	3–1	1–2	3–1	2–0	—	1–1	0–2	1–1
Şanlıurfaspor	4–0	2–1	0–1	1–1	0–2	0–1	1–1	0–0	1–3	1–1	0–0	0–1	0–2	2–0	2–0	—	0–0	0–1
Tuzlaspor	2–1	2–0	1–1	1–1	0–0	1–2	0–3	0–1	0–5	1–1	3–1	1–1	1–2	2–1	1–3	1–1	—	1–1
Ümraniyespor	2–0	0–2	2–0	0–1	1–2	1–2	0–3	2–0	1–3	1–1	2–1	0–0	1–0	3–2	1–1	0–1	1–1	—

Updated to match(es) played on 11 May 2024. Source: TFF
Legend: Blue = home team win; Yellow = draw; Red = away team win.

== Promotion Playoffs ==
=== Bracket ===
Quarterfinals
4	Bodrum	2
7	Boluspor	0
5	Çorum	2
6	Kocaelispor	1

Semifinal
4	Bodrum	1	0	1 (5)
5	Çorum	1	0	1 (4)

Final
3	Sakaryaspor	1
4	Bodrum	3

=== Quarterfinals ===
Team 1	Score	Team 2
Bodrum	2–0	Boluspor
Çorum	2–1	Kocaelispor

16 May 2024	Bodrum	2–0	Boluspor	Bodrum
17:00 TRT (UTC+3)	Dumanlı 80'; Osman 90+7'			Stadium: Bodrum District Stadium

16 May 2024	Çorum	2–1	Kocaelispor	Çorum
20:00 TRT (UTC+3)	Verheydt 33'; Akkaynak 60'		Candeias 90+4'	Stadium: Çorum City Stadium

=== Semifinal ===
Team 1	Agg.	Team 2	1st leg	2nd leg
Çorum	1–1 (4–5 p)	Bodrum	1–1	0–0

20 May 2024 First leg	Çorum	1–1	Bodrum	Çorum
TRT (UTC+3)	Akkaynak 58'		Yalçın 47'	Stadium: Çorum City Stadium

24 May 2024 Second leg	Bodrum	0–0 (5–4 p)	Çorum	Bodrum
TRT (UTC+3)				Stadium: Bodrum District Stadium
	Penalties
	Ergun (penalty scored); Mohammed (penalty scored); Brazão (penalty scored); Aslan (penalty missed); Čelůstka (penalty scored); Akpinar (penalty scored)		(penalty missed) Nalepa; (penalty scored) Landre; (penalty scored) Sağat; (penalty scored) Yazgan; (penalty scored) Touré; (penalty missed) Kaş

=== Final ===
Team 1	Score	Team 2
Sakaryaspor	1–3 (a.e.t.)	Bodrum

30 May 2024	Sakaryaspor	1–3 (a.e.t.)	Bodrum	Adana
20:00 TRT (UTC+3)	Dimitrov 72'		Bayrakdar 19'; Čelůstka 94'; Akpınar 103'	Stadium: New Adana Stadium
