= Musa Mohammed =

Musa Mohammed is the name of:

- Musa Mohammed (footballer), Kenyan footballer
- Musa Mohammed (politician), Nigerian politician
- Musa Muhammed, Nigerian footballer
- Musa Mohamad, Malaysian politician
- Musah Mohammed (born 2002), Ghanaian footballer
