= Arda Özçimen =

Turkish footballer

Personal information
- Date of birth: 8 January 2002 (age 24)
- Place of birth: Konak, Turkey
- Height: 2.02 m (6 ft 8 in)
- Position: Goalkeeper

Team information
- Current team: Göztepe
- Number: 1

Youth career
- 2012–2013: Fethiyespor
- 2013–2018: Göztepe

Senior career*
Years	Team	Apps	(Gls)
2018–	Göztepe	35	(0)
2025–2026	→ Bandırmaspor (loan)	28	(0)

International career^{‡}
2016	Turkey U14	4	(0)
2016–2017	Turkey U15	3	(0)
2017–2018	Turkey U16	9	(0)
2018	Turkey U17	10	(0)
2019–2020	Turkey U18	3	(0)
- * Club domestic league appearances and goals as of 18 October 2026 ‡ National team caps and goals as of 19:50, 8 May 2021 (UTC)

Arda Özçimen (born 8 January 2002), is a Turkish professional footballer who plays as a goalkeeper for Süper Lig club Göztepe.

== Professional career ==
Özçimen started playing football at the youth academy of Fethiyespor, before moving to Göztepe's youth academy in 2013. He signed his first professional contract with Göztepe on 6 August 2018. Özçimen made his professional debut with Göztepe in a 1–1 Süper Lig win over Fatih Karagümrük on 20 April 2021, saving a penalty on his debut.

== International career ==
Özçimen is a youth international for Turkey, representing the Turkey U14s, U15s, U16s, U17s, and U18s. In September 2024, it was announced that he had applied for Bulgarian passport due to his Bulgarian roots, and is open to represent Bulgaria, after being recommended by his Göztepe coach Stanimir Stoilov.

== Personal life ==
Özçimen's father, Yüksel Özçimen, was also a professional football goalkeeper and is the current goalkeeper coach for Ankara Demirspor. His brother, Doğukan, is a semi-pro footballer in Turkey.

== Career statistics ==
=== Club ===
As of match played 7 November 2026

Appearances and goals by club, season and competition
Club	Season	League			Turkish Cup		Total	
Club	Season	Division	Apps	Goals	Apps	Goals	Apps	Goals
Göztepe	2019–20	Süper Lig	0	0	0	0	0	0
Göztepe	2020–21	Süper Lig	3	0	0	0	3	0
Göztepe	2021–22	Süper Lig	4	0	1	0	5	0
Göztepe	2022–23	TFF 1. Lig	17	0	3	0	20	0
Göztepe	2023–24	TFF 1. Lig	3	0	2	0	5	0
Göztepe	2024–25	Süper Lig	4	0	5	0	9	0
Göztepe	2026–27	Süper Lig	8	0	0	0	8	0
Göztepe	Total		39	0	11	0	50	0
Bandırmaspor (loan)	2025–26	TFF 1. Lig	28	0	0	0	28	0
Career total			67	0	11	0	78	0
