= Thuram =

Thuram may refer to one of the following football players:

== France ==
- Lilian Thuram (born 1972), French football player
- Marcus Thuram (born 1997), French football player, son of Lilian
- Khéphren Thuram (born 2001), French football player, son of Lilian
- Yohann Thuram-Ulien (born 1988), French football player, cousin of Lilian

== Brazil ==
- Thuram (Brazilian footballer) (born 1991), Brazilian football player
