= Devrim Şahin =

Turkish footballer (born 2007)

Personal information
- Date of birth: 1 April 2007 (age 19)
- Place of birth: Üsküdar, Turkey
- Height: 1.78 m (5 ft 10 in)
- Position: Winger

Team information
- Current team: Bodrum (on loan from Beşiktaş)
- Number: 52

Youth career
- 2017–2025: Beşiktaş

Senior career*
Years	Team	Apps	(Gls)
2025–	Beşiktaş	4	(0)
2026–	→ Bodrum (loan)	5	(0)

International career^{‡}
2025	Turkey U19	3	(0)
- * Club domestic league appearances and goals as of 23:55, 20 September 2026 (UTC) ‡ National team caps and goals as of 23:55, 21 December 2025 (UTC)

Devrim Şahin (born 13 March 2007) is a Turkish professional footballer who plays as a winger for TFF 1. Lig club Bodrum on loan from Süper Lig club Beşiktaş.

== Club career ==
Şahin joined the youth academy of Beşiktaş in 2017, and on 11 September 2025 signed his first professional contract with the club. On 24 September 2025, he made his senior and professional debut with Fenerbahçe in a 4–0 Süper Lig over Kayserispor.

On 31 July 2026, Şahin was loaned to TFF 1. Lig club Bodrum until the end of the season

== International career ==
Karataş is a youth international for Turkey. He played for the Turkey U19s in a friendly tournament in October 2025.
