= Muhammet Ali Özbaskıcı =

Turkish footballer (born 2005)

Personal information
- Date of birth: 27 September 2005 (age 21)
- Place of birth: Samsun, Turkey
- Height: 1.72 m (5 ft 8 in)
- Position: Midfielder

Team information
- Current team: Sarıyer (on loan from Samsunspor)
- Number: 20

Youth career
- 2015–2021: Samsunspor

Senior career*
Years	Team	Apps	(Gls)
2021–	Samsunspor	20	(1)
2025–	→ Sarıyer (loan)	4	(0)

International career^{‡}
2021	Turkey U17	4	(1)
2023	Turkey U19	5	(0)
2025–	Turkey U20	2	(0)
- * Club domestic league appearances and goals as of 7 November 2025 ‡ National team caps and goals as of 25 March 2025

Muhammet Ali Özbaskıcı (born 27 September 2005) is a Turkish professional footballer who plays as a midfielder for TFF 1. Lig club Sarıyer on loan from Samsunspor.

== Club career ==
A youth product of Samsunspor since 2015, Özbaskıcı signed his first professional contract with the club on 15 July 2021 at the age of 16. He made his senior and professional debut with Samsunspor in a 4–0 Turkish Cup win over Uşakspor on 1 December 2021. He started playing regularly for the club in the 2022–23 season, before ending his season prematurely with a broken wrist. That same season he won the 2022–23 TFF First League, earning promotion to the Süper Lig. The following season, he played most of his matches with Samsunspor's U19 squad.

On 13 November 2025, Özbaskıcı was banned from playing for 6 months for his involvement in the 2025 Turkish football betting scandal.

== International career ==
Özbaskıcı played for the Turkey U17s at the Viktor Bannikov Tournament in August 2021, and helped the team win the tournament. In 2023, he was called up to the Turkey U19s for 2024 UEFA European Under-19 Championship qualification matches.

== Honours ==
Samsunspor

- TFF First League: 2022–23
