= Erdem Çetinkaya =

Turkish footballer

Personal information
- Date of birth: 29 March 2001 (age 25)
- Place of birth: Kızılcahamam, Turkey
- Height: 1.77 m (5 ft 10 in)
- Position: Forward

Team information
- Current team: Ankara Demirspor (on loan from Kasımpaşa)
- Number: 10

Youth career
- 2012–2019: Kızılcahamam Belediyespor

Senior career*
Years	Team	Apps	(Gls)
2019–2022	Ankaraspor	73	(10)
2022	→ Bodrumspor (loan)	19	(9)
2022–	Kasımpaşa	16	(0)
2022–2023	→ Bodrumspor (loan)	23	(1)
2025	→ Sarıyer (loan)	14	(1)
2026–	→ Ankara Demirspor (loan)	7	(2)

International career
2019	Turkey U19	2	(0)
- * Club domestic league appearances and goals as of 18 October 2026

Erdem Çetinkaya (born 29 March 2001) is a Turkish professional footballer who plays as a forward for TFF 2. Lig club Ankara Demirspor on loan from Kasımpaşa.

== Professional career ==
Çetinkaya is a youth product of the academy of Kızılcahamam Belediyespor, and began his senior career with Ankaraspor in 2019. He joined Bodrumspor on loan for the 2021–22 season in the TFF Second League, where he scored 9 goals in 19 games. On 19 July 2022, he transferred to the Süper Lig club Kasımpaşa. He made his professional debut with Kasımpaşa on 8 August 2022 in a 4–0 Süper Lig loss to İstanbul Başakşehir, coming on as a late substitute. On 8 September 2022, Çetinkaya was loaned by Bodrumspor once again for a season (now promoted to the TFF First League), with an option to buy.

== International career ==
Çetinkaya is a youth international for Turkey, having played for the Turkey U19s in 2019.
