= Aminu Umar =

Nigerian footballer

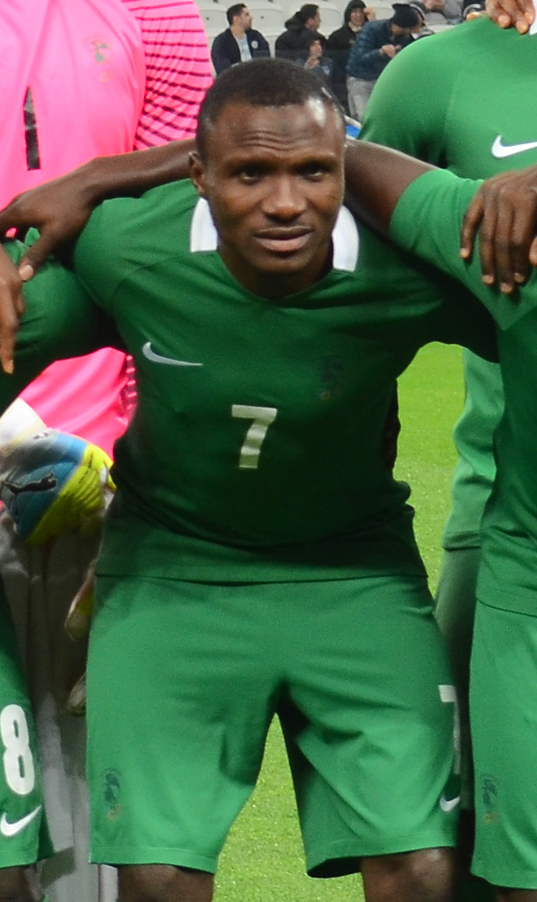
- Umar at the 2016 Olympics

Personal information
- Full name: Aminu Umar
- Date of birth: 6 March 1995 (age 31)
- Place of birth: Abuja, Nigeria
- Height: 1.72 m (5 ft 8 in)
- Position: Winger

Team information
- Current team: Mash'al
- Number: 11

Senior career*
Years	Team	Apps	(Gls)
2011–2013	Wikki Tourists	10	(1)
2013–2014	Samsunspor	45	(8)
2015–2019	Osmanlıspor	101	(22)
2018–2019	→ Çaykur Rizespor (loan)	31	(6)
2019–2022	Çaykur Rizespor	44	(4)
2023	Bodrumspor	16	(2)
2023–2025	Tuzlaspor	17	(2)
2025–	Mash'al	14	(1)

International career^{‡}
2012–2013	Nigeria U20	16	(6)
2016–2018	Nigeria	4	(0)
Medal record
Olympic Games
Bronze medal – third place	2016 Rio de Janeiro	Team
- * Club domestic league appearances and goals as of 5 December 2025 ‡ National team caps and goals as of 31 May 2016

Aminu Umar (born 6 March 1995) is a Nigerian professional footballer who plays as a winger for Uzbekistan Super League club Mash'al and the Nigeria national football team.

== Club career ==
=== Wikki Tourists ===
In 2012–2013 season Umar scored one league goal for Wikki Tourists in the Nigeria Premier League the top league of Nigerian football.

=== Samsunspor ===
Umar joined Turkish club Samsunspor from Wikki Tourists in the 2013 summer transfer season at age 18. He scored four league goals in his first season and established himself as the club's preferred striker in place of his compatriot Ekigho Ehiosun. Umar had his contract terminated after three months without pay.

=== Osmanslıspor ===
On 10 January 2015, Umar joined promotion-seeker rival Osmanslıspor on a free transfer, signing a 3.5 years contract. In the 2016–17 season, he made his debut in continental competition on 21 July 2016, scoring a hattrick against Moldovan side Zimbru during the Europa League qualifiers. Osmanlıspor made it to the group stage of the competition, where Umar netted a goal in the first match against FCSB in a 2–0 victory.

==== Loan to Rizespor ====
On 27 July 2018, Umar joined recently promoted club Çaykur Rizespor on a one-year loan.

=== Rizespor ===
On 4 September 2019, Umar permanently joined Çaykur Rizespor after helping them avoid relegation, signing a three-year contract. He had an anterior cruciate ligament injury that sidelined him for the 2020–21 season.

=== Bodrumspor ===
On 12 January 2023, second division side Bodrumspor announced the signing of Umar on a free transfer, until the end of the season.

=== Tuzlaspor ===
On 15 September 2023, Umar joined Tuzlaspor on a free transfer.

== International career ==
Umar has played for the Nigeria national under-20 football team. He was the leading scorer in the 2013 African youth championship with four goals and scored twice at the 2013 FIFA U-20 World Cup finals in Turkey. He was selected by Nigeria for their 35-man provisional squad for the 2016 Summer Olympics. Umar scored the second goal against Denmark that send Nigeria to the semi-final of Rio 2016 Olympic games.

== Career statistics ==
As of 11 October 2023

Appearances and goals by club, season and competition
Club	Season	League			National Cup		Europe		Total	
Club	Season	Division	Apps	Goals	Apps	Goals	Apps	Goals	Apps	Goals
Samsunspor	2013–14	TFF First League	36	7	0	0	—		36	7
Samsunspor	2014–15	TFF First League	9	1	1	0	—		10	1
Samsunspor	Total		45	8	1	0	0	0	46	8
Osmanlıspor	2014–15	TFF First League	17	4	0	0	—		17	4
Osmanlıspor	2015–16	Süper Lig	28	8	1	0	0	0	29	8
Osmanlıspor	2016–17	Süper Lig	25	5	4	0	10	4	39	9
Osmanlıspor	2017–18	Süper Lig	31	5	3	1	0	0	34	6
Osmanlıspor	Total		101	22	8	1	10	4	119	27
Çaykur Rizespor (loan)	2018–19	Süper Lig	31	6	3	0	0	0	34	6
Çaykur Rizespor	2019–20	Süper Lig	18	3	1	0	0	0	19	3
Çaykur Rizespor	2020–21	Süper Lig	0	0	0	0	0	0	0	0
Çaykur Rizespor	2021–22	Süper Lig	26	1	0	0	0	0	26	1
Çaykur Rizespor	Total		75	10	4	0	0	0	79	10
Bodrumspor	2022–23	TFF First League	16	2	0	0	—		16	2
Tuzlaspor	2023–24	TFF First League	1	0	0	0	—		1	0
Career total			238	42	13	1	10	4	261	47

== Honours ==
Nigeria U23

- Olympic Bronze Medal: 2016

Al-Quwa Al-Jawiya

- Iraq Stars League: 2025–26
