= Recep Aydın =

Turkish footballer (born 1990)

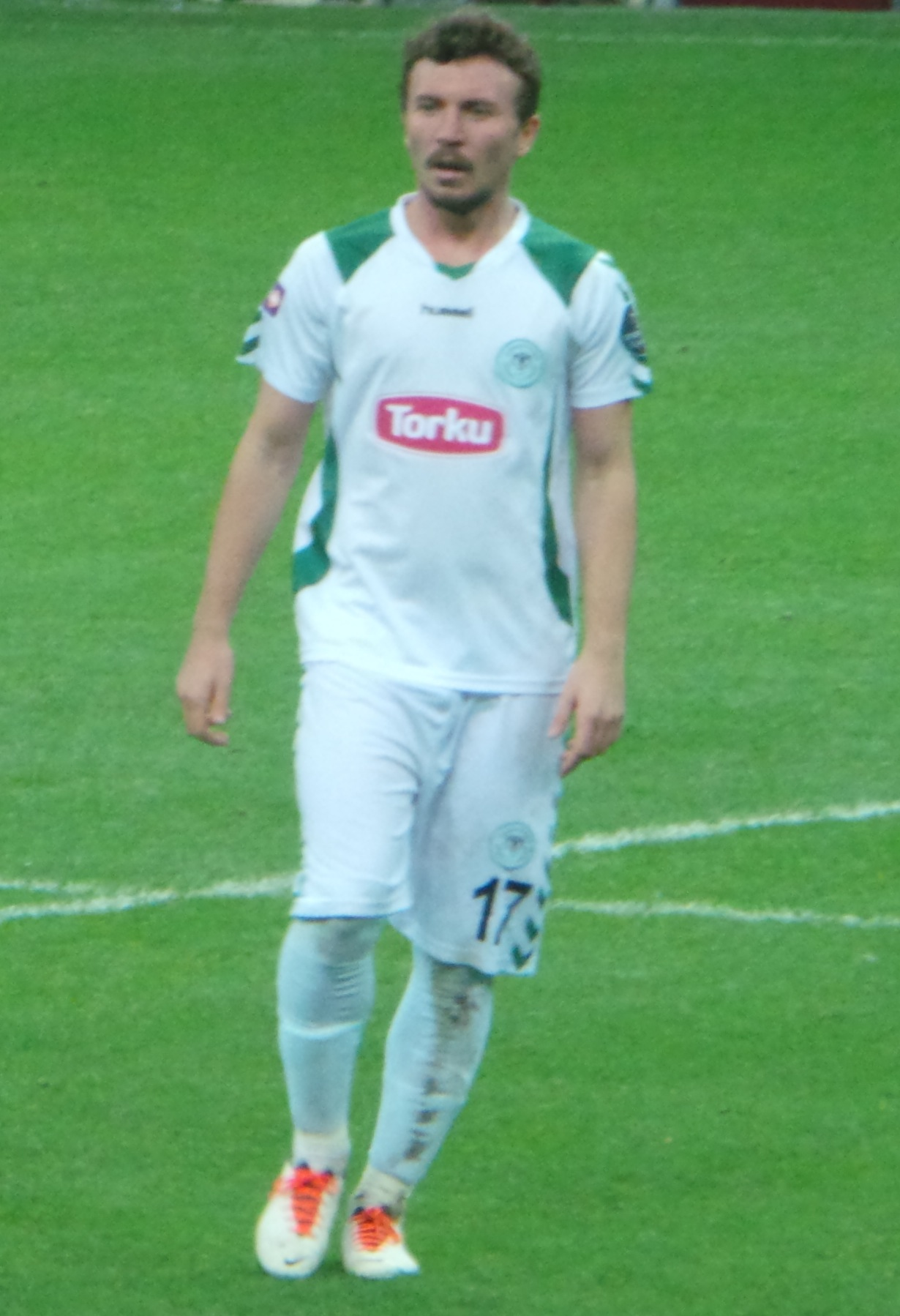
- Recep Aydın in 2013

Personal information
- Date of birth: 27 January 1990 (age 36)
- Place of birth: Çanakkale, Turkey
- Height: 1.79 m (5 ft 10 in)
- Position: Attacking midfielder

Team information
- Current team: Menemen
- Number: 23

Senior career*
Years	Team	Apps	(Gls)
2008–2019	Konyaspor	111	(15)
2010	→ İstanbulspor (loan)	12	(2)
2010–2011	→ İnegölspor (loan)	33	(4)
2015–2016	→ Karabükspor (loan)	27	(1)
2016–2017	→ Giresunspor (loan)	33	(7)
2017–2018	→ Giresunspor (loan)	23	(2)
2018–2019	→ Ümraniyespor (loan)	26	(5)
2019–2021	Bursaspor	37	(4)
2021–2022	Altınordu	49	(5)
2022–2023	Bodrumspor	19	(1)
2023	Altınordu	11	(0)
2023–	Menemen	5	(0)
- * Club domestic league appearances and goals as of 23 September 2023

Recep Aydın (born 27 January 1990) is a Turkish footballer who plays as a midfielder for Menemen.
