= Ege Bilsel =

Turkish footballer

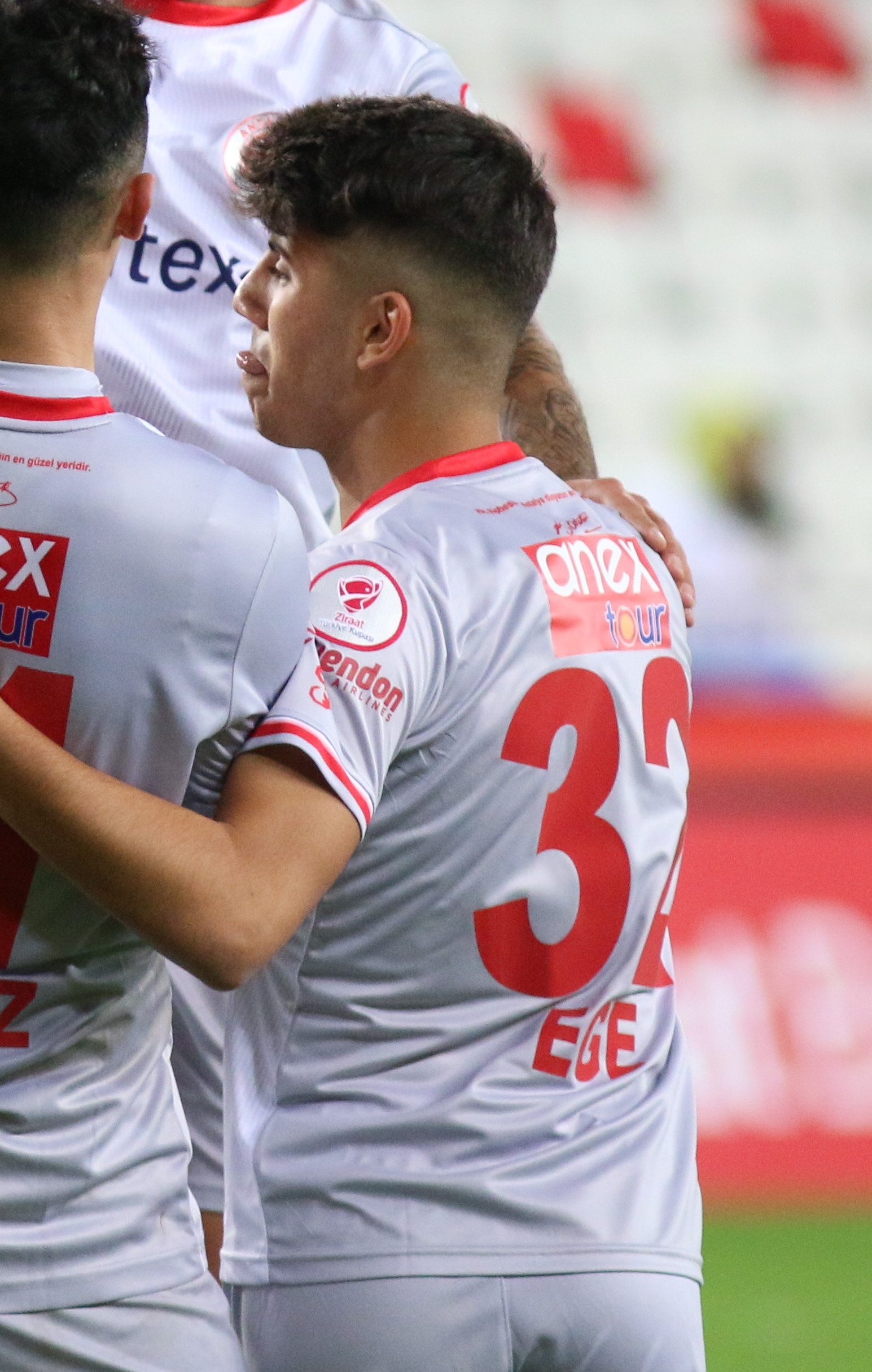
- Bilsel in 2021

Personal information
- Date of birth: 4 January 2004 (age 22)
- Place of birth: Yenimahalle, Türkiye
- Height: 1.75 m (5 ft 9 in)
- Position: Winger

Team information
- Current team: Bodrum
- Number: 70

Youth career
- 2014–2015: Gündoğanspor
- 2015–2019: Bodrum
- 2019–2022: Antalyaspor

Senior career*
Years	Team	Apps	(Gls)
2019–2024	Antalyaspor	3	(0)
2024–	Bodrum	61	(2)

International career^{‡}
2021	Azerbaijan U19	2	(1)
2024–	Türkiye U21	2	(0)
- * Club domestic league appearances and goals as of 5 May 2026 ‡ National team caps and goals as of 03:45, 23 December 2024 (UTC)

Ege Bilsel (born 4 January 2004) is a Turkish professional footballer who plays as a winger for the TFF 1. Lig club Bodrum.

== Club career ==
Bilsel is a youth product of Gündoğanspor before moving to Bodrum in 2015 where he finished his development. In 2019 he transferred to Antalyaspor. He made his senior and professional debut with Antalyaspor in a 2–2 Turkish Cup tie with Eyüpspor on 17 December 2019. On 15 December 2021, he signed his first professional contract with Antalyaspor. On 24 January 2024, he returned to Bodrum in the TFF First League, and helped them earn promotion to the Süper Lig.

== International career ==
Born in Turkey, Bilsel was called up to the Azerbaijan U17s in September 2021. In November 2024, he was called up to the Türkiye U21 national team for a set of friendlies.
