= Çorum City Stadium =

Stadium in Çorum, Turkey

- Interactive map of Çorum City Stadium
- Full name: Çorum Şehir Stadyumu
- Location: Çorum, Turkey
- Coordinates: 40.534444°N 34.922778°E
- Owner: General Directorate of Sports Services (SHGM)
- Operator: Çorum F.K.
- Capacity: 13,119
- Surface: Grass

Construction
- Groundbreaking: April 2016
- Built: 2016–2020
- Opened: 20 September 2020
- Cost: ₺209 million
- Architect: Bahadir Kul Architects
- General contractor: Çakır İnşaat

Tenant
- Çorum F.K. (2020–present)

The Çorum City Stadium (Turkish: Çorum Şehir Stadyumu) is a stadium in Çorum, Turkey. Opened in 2020, it is the home of Çorum F.K. with a capacity of 13,119.

== History ==
The stadium's design by Istanbul-based Bahadir Kul Architects was unveiled in 2014. Construction began in April 2016, but delays caused by funding issues postponed completion until 2020. The stadium was officially handed over to the Ministry of Youth and Sports on 29 June 2020. Construction costs ultimately rose from the initial ₺60 million to approximately ₺209 million.
