= Koray Kılınç =

Turkish footballer

Personal information
- Date of birth: 4 March 2000 (age 26)
- Place of birth: Trabzon, Turkey
- Height: 1.92 m (6 ft 4 in)
- Position: Forward

Team information
- Current team: İnegölspor
- Number: 9

Youth career
- 2012–2018: Kartalspor
- 2018–2019: Trabzonspor

Senior career*
Years	Team	Apps	(Gls)
2019–2022	Trabzonspor	5	(0)
2020–2021	→ Turgutluspor (loan)	11	(5)
2021	→ İstanbulspor (loan)	8	(1)
2021–2022	→ Sarıyer (loan)	30	(10)
2022–2024	Bodrum	18	(1)
2023–2024	→ Ankara Keçiörengücü (loan)	15	(1)
2024	→ Sakaryaspor (loan)	8	(0)
2024–2026	Erzurumspor	18	(0)
2026	Aliağa FK	3	(0)
2026–	İnegölspor	5	(3)

International career^{‡}
2018	Turkey Futsal U-19	2	(0)
2019	Turkey U-20	1	(0)
- * Club domestic league appearances and goals as of 11 October 2026 ‡ National team caps and goals as of 16 August 2020

Koray Kılınç (born 4 March 2000) is a Turkish footballer who plays as a forward for TFF 2. Lig club İnegölspor.

== Club career ==
On 1 September 2019, Kılınç made his Süper Lig debut on away encounter at week 3 against Fenerbahçe S.K., ended 1–1.

== International career ==
On 5 and 6 December 2018, Kılınç earned two caps with the Turkey national futsal team at U-19 level, both against Serbia, both ended respective wins for Turkey as 0–3 and 2–4.

== Honours ==
Trabzonspor

- Turkish Cup: 2019–20
