= Halil İbrahim Sevinç =

Turkish footballer

Personal information
- Date of birth: 24 January 2002 (age 24)
- Place of birth: Antalya, Turkey
- Height: 1.77 m (5 ft 10 in)
- Position: Midfielder

Team information
- Current team: Serik Belediyespor

Youth career
- 2014–2017: Bülent Demirspor
- 2012–2014: Dokumaspor
- 2014–2015: Özerspor
- 2015–2019: Antalyaspor

Senior career*
Years	Team	Apps	(Gls)
2019–2021	Antalyaspor	0	(0)
2021	→ Bodrumspor (loan)	12	(0)
2021–	Bodrum	29	(1)
2022–2023	→ Serik Belediyespor (loan)	27	(1)
2024–	→ Serik Belediyespor (Loan)	2	(0)

International career^{‡}
2017–2018	Turkey U16	10	(0)
2018–2019	Turkey U17	21	(2)
2019	Turkey U18	3	(0)
- * Club domestic league appearances and goals as of 4 February 2024 ‡ National team caps and goals as of 25 July 2020

Halil İbrahim Sevinç (born 24 January 2002) is a Turkish professional footballer who plays as a midfielder for TFF Second League club Serik Belediyespor on loan from Bodrum.

== Professional career ==
Sevinç made his professional debut with Antalyaspor in a 3-3 Turkish Cup tie with Göztepe on 14 January 2019.

== International career ==
Sevinç is a youth international for Turkey.
