= Erkan Değişmez =

Turkish footballer (born 2005)

Personal information
- Date of birth: 27 August 1986 (age 40)
- Place of birth: İzmir, Türkiye
- Height: 1.79 m (5 ft 10 in)
- Position: Defensive midfielder

Youth career
- 2000–2004: Karşıyaka Belediyespor
- 2004–2005: Kocaelispor
- 2005–2006: Alaçatıspor Kulübü
- 2006–2007: Karşıyaka
- 2007–2008: Torbalıspor

Senior career*
Years	Team	Apps	(Gls)
2008–2011	Torbalıspor	76	(0)
2011	Menemen	10	(0)
2011–2012	Tekirova Belediyespor	28	(2)
2012–2013	Manisa Belediyespor	18	(0)
2013–2014	Çine Madranspor	29	(1)
2014–2025	Bodrum	278	(6)
- * Club domestic league appearances and goals as of 1 June 2025

Erkan Değişmez (born 27 August 1986) is a Turkish former professional footballer who played as a midfielder.

== Career ==
Değişmez is a product of the youth academies of Karşıyaka Belediyespor, Kocaelispor, Alaçatıspor Kulübü, Karşıyaka and Torbalıspor. In 2008, he began his senior career with Torbalıspor in the TFF Third League. In January 2011, he moved over to Menemen for the second half of the 2010–11 season. The following season, he transferred to Antalya Kemerspor. In 2012, he returned to amateur football with Manisa Belediyespor in the Turkish Regional Amateur League. In 2013, he joined Çine Madranspor for a stint in the same division.

Değişmez transferred Bodrum for the 2014–15 season where he became captain, and immediately helped them win the Amateur League and returned to professional football in the TFF Third League. He helped them win the 2016–17 TFF Third League, and on 4 July 2019 extended his contract with the club. In 2021–22 they were promoted from the TFF Second League. On 11 July 2022, he extended his contract with Bodrum. In 2022–2023, Bodrum lost the play-off finals against Pendikspor. On 6 June 2023, he again extended his contract with the club. In 2023–2024, they again made the playoffs and won against Sakaryaspor, earning promotion to the Süper Lig, his fourth promotion with Bodrum.

Değişmez remained captain of the squad ahead of their season in the league. On 15 February 2025, he made his Süper Lig debut with Bodrum in a 1–0 win over İstanbul Başakşehir at the age of 38. On 23 February 2025, he was named as a technical director with Bodrum.

== Honours ==
Bodrum

- Turkish Regional Amateur League: 2014–2015
- TFF Third League: 2016–17
