= Musa Mohammed (footballer) =

Kenyan footballer (born 1991)

Personal information
- Full name: Musa Mohammed Mayieko
- Date of birth: 6 June 1991 (age 35)
- Place of birth: Nairobi, Kenya
- Height: 1.76 m (5 ft 9 in)
- Position: Centre back

Team information
- Current team: Nkana

Senior career*
Years	Team	Apps	(Gls)
2010–2017	Gor Mahia		
2017–2018	KF Tirana	4	(0)
2018–	Nkana		

International career^{‡}
2011–	Kenya	34	(0)
- * Club domestic league appearances and goals as of 09:16, 19 February 2019 (UTC) ‡ National team caps and goals as of 09:16, 19 February 2019 (UTC)

Musa Mohammed Mayieko (born 6 June 1991) is a Kenyan international footballer who plays for Nkana, as a centre back.

== Club career ==
Born in Nairobi, Mohammed began his career at Gor Mahia, serving as captain. With Gor Mahia he won the Kenyan Premier League four times, as well as the Kenyan Super Cup.

He signed a two-year contract with Albanian club KF Tirana, but the contract was terminated in April 2018 after four months, after he failed to adapt to Europe. Mohammed claims he terminated the contract due to "several issues, some personal, some monetary".

In July 2018 he signed a two-year contract with Zambian club Nkana.

== International career ==
Mohammed made his international debut for Kenya in 2011. He captained the national team to victory at the 2017 Cecafa Senior Challenge Cup.
