= Celal Dumanlı =

Turkish footballer (born 2005)

Personal information
- Date of birth: 28 April 1994 (age 32)
- Place of birth: Bodrum, Türkiye
- Height: 1.89 m (6 ft 2 in)
- Position: Forward

Team information
- Current team: Bodrum
- Number: 48

Youth career
- 2006–2012: Bodrum

Senior career*
Years	Team	Apps	(Gls)
2012–	Bodrum	327	(55)
- * Club domestic league appearances and goals as of 5 May 2026

Celal Dumanlı (born 28 April 1994) is a Turkish professional footballer who plays for Bodrum as a forward.

== Career ==
Dumanlı joined the youth academy of Bodrum at the age of 12 in 2006, and worked his way up their youth categories. In 2012, he debuted with Bodrum's first team in the Turkish Regional Amateur League. In the 2014–15 season, he helped the club win the Amateur League and achieve professional football in the TFF Third League. Soon after, they won the 2016–17 TFF Third League. In 2021–22 Bodrum was promoted from the TFF Second League. In 2022–2023, Bodrum lost the play-off finals against Pendikspor. On 6 June 2023, he again extended his contract with the club. On 14 July 2023, he extended his contract with Bodrum until 2025. In 2023–2024, they again made the playoffs and won against Sakaryaspor, earning promotion to the Süper Lig, Dumanlı's fifth promotion with Bodrum.

He made his Süper Lig debut with Bodrum in a 1–0 loss to Gaziantep on 12 August 2024. In doing so, he began the first player to ever play for all 6 of Türkiye's top football divisions.

== Personal life ==
On 2 June 2025, Dumanlı married Begüm Güldeste, a physical education teacher and his girlfriend of 5 years, in Bodrum.

== Honours ==
Bodrum

- Turkish Regional Amateur League: 2014–2015
- TFF Third League: 2016–17
