= Ahmet Aslan (footballer) =

Turkish footballer

Personal information
- Date of birth: 29 June 2001 (age 25)
- Place of birth: Ankara, Türkiye
- Height: 1.79 m (5 ft 10 in)
- Position: Defensive midfielder

Team information
- Current team: Bodrum
- Number: 21

Youth career
- 2013–2021: Ankaragücü

Senior career*
Years	Team	Apps	(Gls)
2021–2023	Menemen	9	(0)
2022–2023	→ Bergama Belediyespor (loan)	16	(0)
2023–2024	Bucaspor 1928	30	(3)
2024–	Bodrum	77	(3)
- * Club domestic league appearances and goals as of 5 May 2026

Ahmet Aslan (born 29 June 2001) is a Turkish professional footballer who plays as a defensive midfielder for the TFF 1. Lig club Bodrum.

== Club career ==
Aslan is a product of the youth academy of Ankaragücü until the U19 level. On 30 October 2020, he signed his first professional contract with Ankaragücü. He joined Menemen in the TFF Third League in 2021, and the following season joined Bergama Belediyespor on a year-long loan transfer. On 8 January 2023, he transferred to the TFF First League club Bucaspor 1928.

On 10 January 2023, Aslan transferred to Bodrum on a 4.5 year contract. He helped the club come fourth in the TFF First League on his debut with them and earned promotion to the 2024–25 Süper Lig.
