= Süleyman Özdamar =

Turkish footballer

Personal information
- Date of birth: 25 February 1993 (age 33)
- Place of birth: Konak, Turkey
- Height: 1.82 m (6 ft 0 in)
- Position: Centre back

Team information
- Current team: Sivasspor
- Number: 25

Youth career
- 2005–2010: Altay

Senior career*
Years	Team	Apps	(Gls)
2010–2013	Gaziantepspor	1	(0)
2012	→ Bozüyükspor (loan)	2	(0)
2012–2013	→ Gölcükspor (loan)	10	(0)
2013–2014	Gaziantepspor A2	5	(0)
2014–2015	Bayrampaşaspor	40	(1)
2015–2016	Gaziantepspor	1	(0)
2016	Giresunspor	0	(0)
2016	→ Bayrampaşaspor (loan)	15	(0)
2016–2017	Aydınspor 1923	19	(0)
2017–2018	Silivrispor	21	(0)
2018–2020	BAKspor	44	(0)
2020	Bodrum	7	(0)
2020–2021	Turgutluspor	14	(1)
2021–2025	Bodrum	100	(3)
2025–2026	Elazığspor	28	(0)
2026–	Sivasspor	4	(0)

International career
2008	Turkey U15		
2008–2009	Turkey U16		
2009	Turkey U17		
2009–2010	Turkey U18		
2011	Turkey U19		
- * Club domestic league appearances and goals as of 7 November 2026

Süleyman Özdamar (born 25 February 1993) is a Turkish footballer who plays for TFF 1. Lig club Sivasspor. He made his Süper Lig debut on 17 May 2013.

== International career ==
Özdamar represented Turkey at the 2009 FIFA U-17 World Cup.
