= Diogo Sousa (footballer, born 1998) =

Portuguese footballer

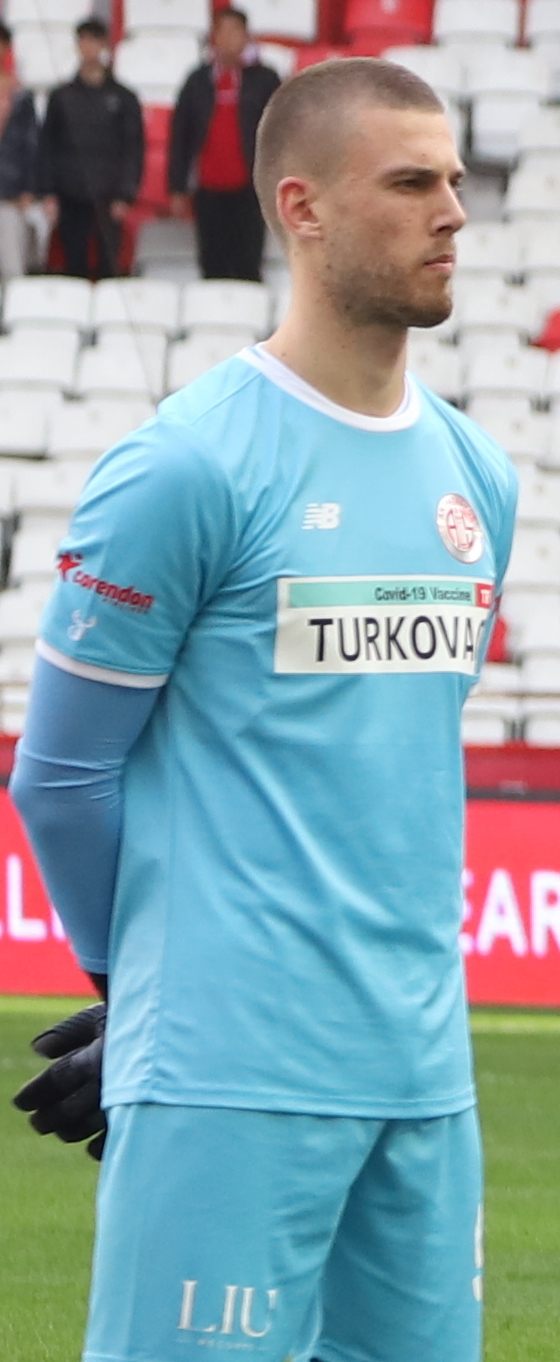
- Sousa with Antalyaspor in 2022

Personal information
- Full name: Diogo Fesnard Nogueira de Sousa
- Date of birth: 16 September 1998 (age 28)
- Place of birth: Albufeira, Portugal
- Height: 1.98 m (6 ft 6 in)
- Position: Goalkeeper

Team information
- Current team: Bodrum
- Number: 1

Youth career
- 2007–2012: Ferreiras
- 2012–2013: Imortal
- 2013–2014: CAC
- 2014–2017: Sporting CP

Senior career*
Years	Team	Apps	(Gls)
2017–2018	Sporting CP B	2	(0)
2019–2021	Sporting CP	0	(0)
2021–2023	Antalyaspor	1	(0)
2022–2023	→ Bodrumspor (loan)	29	(0)
2023–	Bodrum	88	(0)
- * Club domestic league appearances and goals as of 5 May 2026

Diogo Fesnard Nogueira de Sousa (born 16 September 1998) is a Portuguese footballer who plays as a goalkeeper for Turkish club Bodrum.

== Football career ==
Born in Albufeira on the Algarve, Sousa joined Sporting CP's academy in 2014. On 6 May 2018, he made his professional debut with the reserve team in a 1–0 LigaPro win away to Vitória S.C. B. The reserve team was then dissolved and reconstituted as an under-23 team, and he signed a new three-year contract in May 2019.

Sousa had his initial call-up to Sporting's first team for the UEFA Europa League group game at home to PSV Eindhoven on 28 November 2019, remaining an unused substitute as fellow academy player Luís Maximiano was fielded.

On 30 June 2021, without having debuted for Sporting's first team, Sousa signed a four-year deal at Antalyaspor in the Turkish Süper Lig. While Belgian veteran Ruud Boffin played the league fixtures, Sousa made his debut in the third round of the Cup on 28 October, a 5–0 home win over Diyarbakırspor.

On 5 September 2022, Sousa joined Bodrumspor on a season-long loan with an option to buy.

In that season Sousa and Bodrumspor reached the championship playoff final losing it to Pendikspor.

One year later in the 23-24 season, Sousa and Bodrumspor reached once again the final and got promoted to the SuperLig.

After the promotion, he signed a new 3 year contract with Bodrumspor and made 34 appearances between SuperLig and Cup matches. He kept 14 clean sheets that season becoming the 2nd best goalkeeper.

In the current season 25-26 Sousa made 29 appearances and kept 12 clean sheets.

== Honours ==
Bodrum FK

- TFF 1. Lig: 2023-24 play-off winner
