= Omar Imeri =

Macedonian-Albanian footballer

Personal information
- Full name: Omar Imeri
- Date of birth: 13 December 1999 (age 26)
- Place of birth: Skopje, Macedonia
- Height: 1.75 m (5 ft 9 in)
- Position: Wing-back

Team information
- Current team: Batman Petrolspor
- Number: 11

Senior career*
Years	Team	Apps	(Gls)
2017–2018	Shkupi	24	(3)
2018–2020	Shkëndija	48	(13)
2020–2021	Antalyaspor	16	(0)
2021–2026	Bodrum	80	(2)
2022	→ Shkupi (loan)	14	(2)
2024–2025	→ Batman Petrolspor (loan)	31	(8)
2026–	Batman Petrolspor	6	(2)

International career^{‡}
2018	North Macedonia U21	1	(0)
2019	Albania U21	4	(1)
- * Club domestic league appearances and goals as of 18 October 2026 ‡ National team caps and goals as of 19 October 2020

Omar Imeri (born 13 December 1999) is a professional footballer who plays as a wing-back for Turkish TFF 1. Lig club Batman Petrolspor. Born in Macedonia, Imeri is a former youth international for Albania.

== Club career ==
On 7 September 2020, Imeri signed a professional contract with Antalyaspor. Imeri made his professional debut with Antalyaspor in a 5-1 Süper Lig win over İstanbul Başakşehir on 24 October 2020.

== International career ==
Born in North Macedonia, Imeri is of Albanian descent. He represented the North Macedonia U21s once, and switched to represent the Albania U21.
