= Kenan Özer =

Turkish footballer

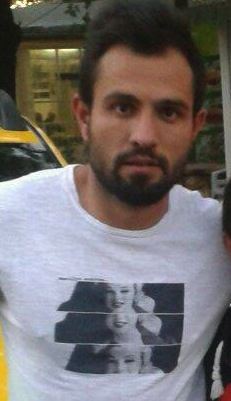

Personal information
- Date of birth: 16 August 1987 (age 39)
- Place of birth: Nicosia, North Cyprus
- Height: 1.70 m (5 ft 7 in)
- Positions: Winger; attacking midfielder

Team information
- Current team: Mağusa Türk Gücü
- Number: 22

Youth career
- 2004–2005: Beşiktaş

Senior career*
Years	Team	Apps	(Gls)
2006–2010	Beşiktaş	1	(0)
2007	→ Karşıyaka (loan)	13	(2)
2007–2008	→ İstanbulspor (loan)	29	(7)
2008–2009	→ Kayseri Erciyesspor (loan)	30	(9)
2009–2010	→ Çaykur Rizespor (loan)	31	(4)
2010–2012	Antalyaspor	27	(1)
2012	Boluspor	15	(4)
2012–2015	Akhisar Belediyespor	62	(8)
2015–2016	Konyaspor	13	(0)
2016	Adana Demirspor	14	(0)
2016–2017	Dumlupınar	12	(6)
2017–2019	Ankaragücü	59	(11)
2019–2022	Gaziantep	87	(9)
2022	Yeni Malatyaspor	12	(1)
2022–2025	Bodrum	66	(23)
2025–	Mağusa Türk Gücü		

International career
2006	Turkey U19	5	(0)
- * Club domestic league appearances and goals as of 5 January 2025

Kenan Özer (born 16 August 1987) is a Turkish footballer who plays for Northern Cypriot club Mağusa Türk Gücü.

== Career ==
He previously played as a striker in Turkey for the Istanbul sports club, Beşiktaş J.K. and Çaykur Rizespor in the TFF First League.

A native of Nicosia, the capital of Cyprus, Kenan Özer was born in the part of the city, known by its Turkish name, Lefkoşa, which also serves as the capital of the internationally unrecognized Turkish Republic of Northern Cyprus. While playing, he wore 80 as the unusual number on his shirt.
