= Thuram (Brazilian footballer) =

Brazilian footballer (born 1991)

Personal information
- Full name: Rogério Conceição do Rosário
- Date of birth: 1 February 1991 (age 35)
- Place of birth: Cairu, Brazil
- Height: 1.83 m (6 ft 0 in)
- Position: Forward

Team information
- Current team: Pendikspor
- Number: 34

Senior career*
Years	Team	Apps	(Gls)
2011–2014	Atlético Paranaense	0	(0)
2012	→ Novo Hamburgo (loan)	5	(0)
2012	→ Chapecoense (loan)	8	(1)
2013	→ Bahia (loan)	3	(0)
2013–2014	→ Aris Limassol (loan)	31	(15)
2014–2019	Monte Azul	0	(0)
2014–2016	→ Apollon Limassol (loan)	43	(6)
2016–2019	→ Kerkyra (loan)	61	(17)
2019–2020	Lamia	15	(6)
2020	Konyaspor	16	(1)
2020–2021	Tuzlaspor	30	(14)
2021–2022	Ionikos	23	(4)
2022–2024	Pendikspor	43	(12)
2024	Eyüpspor	15	(3)
2024–2025	Iğdır	34	(7)
2025–	Pendikspor	35	(9)
- * Club domestic league appearances and goals as of 5 May 2026

Rogério Conceição do Rosário (born 1 February 1991), simply known as Thuram, is a Brazilian professional footballer who plays as a forward for Turkish TFF 1. Lig club Pendikspor.
