= Musah Mohammed =

Ghanaian footballer (born 2002)

Personal information
- Date of birth: 5 January 2002 (age 24)
- Place of birth: Accra, Ghana
- Height: 1.92 m (6 ft 4 in)
- Position: Defensive midfielder

Team information
- Current team: Sivasspor
- Number: 20

Youth career
- 2014–2021: Bectero FC

Senior career*
Years	Team	Apps	(Gls)
2021	Ankaraspor	1	(0)
2021–2022	Eyüpspor	6	(0)
2022–2026	Bodrum	106	(3)
2026	Göztepe	11	(0)
2026–	Sivasspor	8	(0)
- * Club domestic league appearances and goals as of 17 October 2026

Musah Mohammed (born 5 January 2002) is a Ghanaian professional footballer who plays as a defensive midfielder for TFF 1. Lig club Sivasspor.

== Career ==
A youth product of the Ghanaian club Bectero FC, Mohammed moved to Turkey with Ankaraspor in the TFF First League on 31 January 2021. He spent the 2021–22 season with Eyüpspor. On 29 July 2022, he transferred to Bodrum. He helped them achieve promotion to the Süper Lig for the 2024–25 season. He made his 100th appearance for Bodrum on 24 September 2025, a 2–0 win over Vanspor in the TFF First League. On 4 February 2026, Mohammed transferred to Süper Lig club Göztepe on a three-and-a-half-year contract.
