= Pendikspor =

- Full name: Pendik Spor Kulübü
- Founded: 1950; 76 years ago
- Ground: Pendik Stadium, Pendik, Istanbul
- Capacity: 4,105
- Coordinates: 40°53′17″N 29°13′40″E
- Chairman: Murat Özdemir
- Head coach: Murat Şahin
- League: TFF 1. Lig
- 2025–26: TFF 1. Lig, 6th of 20
- Website: www.pendikspor.org.tr
Home colours	Away colours	Third colours

Pendikspor is a Turkish sports club based in Pendik, Istanbul. The club's homeground is the Pendik Stadium.

== History ==
Pendikspor's best known football section, with a history dating back to 1927, continued its activities without being subject to official procedures until 1950. The club competed in the Istanbul amateur leagues until the 1982–83 season. With the establishment of the 3rd League in 1984, the club gained professional status and remained in the TFF Third League until the 1992–93 season. After being relegated to amateur status that season, the team returned to the TFF Third League the following year. In the 1997–98 season, the club became champions of the TFF Third League and were promoted to the TFF Second League. The club played in this league for two seasons and then were relegated back to the TFF Third League in the 1999–2000 season.

On 14 December 1999, in the Turkish Cup draw, vice president Yunus Abanozoğlu drew Fenerbahçe as the opponent, and the match was played at Pendikspor's home ground. The club gained recognition by defeating Fenerbahçe 2–1. In the 2003–04 season, the club became champions of the TFF Third League Group 4 and proceeded to be promoted to the TFF Second League. From 2003-04 to 2021-22 they competed in the TFF Second League then getting promoted to the TFF First League. In the 2005–06 season, the club reached the play-offs to determine the third team to be promoted to the TFF First League. However, they were eliminated by Eskişehirspor in the final match. On 28 November 2012, thirteen years after their previous encounter in 1999, Fenerbahçe and Pendikspor were drawn against each other again in the 4th round of the Turkish Cup. This draw led to laughter in the room where the draw took place, and headlines stated, "They drew their jinx." The match ended with Fenerbahçe winning by the scoreline 1-0 thanks to a goal from Sezer Öztürk in the 45th minute.

In the 2014–15 season, the club finished 2nd in the TFF Second League White group, qualified for the play-offs, and eliminated Menemen FK in the quarter-finals. However, they were defeated by 1461 Trabzon in the semi-finals, therefore missing out on promotion to the TFF First League. In the 2021–22 season, Pendikspor secured the championship of the TFF Second League League White Group with 5 weeks left in the season. By defeating Eskişehirspor 3–1, the red and white team guaranteed promotion to the TFF First League.

In the 2022–23 season, the club won the play-off final match against Bodrumspor 2–1, achieving promotion to the Süper Lig for the first time in its history.

== Stadium ==
The football team play their home matches in the Pendik Stadium.

== Honours ==
- TFF 2. Lig
  - Winners: 1997–98
- TFF 3. Lig
  - Winners: 2003–04

== League participation ==
- Süper Lig: 2023–24
- TFF First League: 1998–2000, 2022–23, 2024–
- TFF Second League: 2004–2022
- TFF Third League: 1984–1993, 1994–1998, 2000–2004
- Turkish Regional Amateur League: 1950–1984, 1993–1994

== Current squad ==
As of 14 November 2026

Note: Flags indicate national team as defined under FIFA eligibility rules; some limited exceptions apply. Players may hold more than one non-FIFA nationality.

No.	Pos.	Nation	Player
2	DF	TUR	Taha Emre İnce
4	DF	TUR	Ahmet Özkaya
5	DF	TUR	Berkay Sülüngöz
6	DF	CRO	Vinko Soldo
7	FW	TUR	Emrah Başsan
9	FW	JAM	Jonson Clarke-Harris
14	MF	TUR	Hakan Yeşil
17	DF	GER	Samuel Abifade
19	MF	TUR	Baran Demiroğlu
20	MF	TUR	Yekta Sönmez
21	MF	TUR	Safa Yıldırım
22	DF	TUR	Kerem Kalafat
23	DF	TUR	Erdem Gökçe
25	DF	CMR	Favour Fomujang
27	MF	SEN	Ismaila Manga
28	MF	TUR	Efehan Pekdemir

No.	Pos.	Nation	Player
30	GK	TUR	Emre Koyuncu
33	GK	TUR	Hüseyin İşlek
34	FW	BRA	Thuram
41	MF	TUR	Mesut Özdemir (captain)
50	MF	CRO	Mirko Sušak
60	MF	TUR	Bekir Karadeniz
61	FW	TUR	Onuralp Çakıroğlu
66	DF	TUR	Furkan Doğan
77	MF	BEL	Adnan Uğur
78	GK	TUR	Emir Dadük
87	FW	TUR	Oğulcan Aşıkcı
88	FW	BIH	Damir Hrelja
93	MF	TUR	Burak Gültekin (on loan from Kasımpaşa)
97	GK	TUR	Utku Yuvakuran
99	FW	TUR	Muhammed Kiprit

=== Other players under contract ===
Note: Flags indicate national team as defined under FIFA eligibility rules; some limited exceptions apply. Players may hold more than one non-FIFA nationality.

No.	Pos.	Nation	Player
—	DF	TUR	Tarık Tekdal

=== Out on loan ===
Note: Flags indicate national team as defined under FIFA eligibility rules; some limited exceptions apply. Players may hold more than one non-FIFA nationality.

No.	Pos.	Nation	Player
—	FW	TUR	Ozan Demirbağ (at Yozgat Belediyesi Bozokspor until 30 June 2027)
—	FW	TUR	Ahmet Karademir (at Şanlıurfaspor until 30 June 2027)

No.	Pos.	Nation	Player
—	FW	TUR	Hasan Karslı (at Yozgat Belediyesi Bozokspor until 30 June 2027)
—	FW	TUR	Ahmet Mert Koşar (at Kartal Bulvar Kartalimenspor until 30 June 2027)

== Former footballers ==
- Emrah Başsan
- Yaser Yıldız
- Uğur Uçar
