= Bodrum F.K. =

Turkish football club

Bodrum
- Full name: Bodrum Futbol Kulübü A.Ş.
- Founded: 1931; 95 years ago
- Stadium: Grey Beton Bodrum Stadium
- Capacity: 4,563
- Coordinates: 37°02′25″N 27°25′53″E
- Owner: Fikret Öztürk
- Chairman: Aşkın Demir
- Head coach: Burhan Eşer
- League: TFF 1. Lig
- 2025–26: TFF 1. Lig, 5th of 20
- Website: bodrumspor.com
Home colours	Away colours	Third colours

Bodrum Futbol Kulübü, known as Sipay Bodrumspor due to sponsorship reasons, is a Turkish professional football club based in the resort town of Bodrum, Muğla Province. Established in 1931, the club spent much of its early existence in amateur leagues before gradually rising through the Turkish football pyramid.

As of the 2024–25 season, Bodrum FK made its debut in Turkey’s top division, the Süper Lig, after winning the promotion play-off final in 2024 to become the first club ever from Muğla Province to reach that level.

The club plays its home matches at the Grey Beton Bodrum İlçe Stadyumu, a modest venue that met licensing requirements following upgrades ahead of its top-flight entry.

== History ==
The club traces its roots to 1931, when local footballer Derviş Görgün and his peers formed Bodrumspor. For decades the team competed in regional amateur competitions around Muğla province; green and white became the club’s traditional colours and identity. After long spells outside the national pyramid, Bodrum made their first entry to the professional leagues in 1995, stepping up to the 3. Lig for the first time in the club’s history.

Backed by the municipality in the early 2010s, the club competed as Bodrum Belediyesi Bodrumspor and returned to the national tiers again in 2014–15, moving up from the Regional Amateur League (BAL) to 3. Lig; two years later, in 2016–17, they topped their group to earn promotion to the 2. Lig.

The rise continued in 2021–22. Bodrum defeated Karacabey Belediyespor 3–0 in the TFF 2. Lig play-off final to clinch promotion to the TFF 1. Lig, marking a return to the second tier for the Bodrum side. In 2022–23 they came within one step of the top flight but lost 2–1 to Pendikspor in the 1. Lig play-off final.

Ahead of the 2023–24 campaign the professional football branch completed a corporate rebrand as Bodrum Futbol Kulübü, while retaining the club’s Bodrum identity and colours. That season culminated in the most significant achievement in the club’s history: on 31 May 2024, Bodrum FK beat Sakaryaspor 3–1 (a.e.t.) in the 1. Lig play-off final at Atatürk Olympic Stadium to win promotion to the Süper Lig for the first time and become the first club from Muğla province ever to reach Turkey’s top flight.

== Stadium ==
Bodrum FK currently hosts its home matches at Bodrum İlçe Stadyumu, located in the Türkkuyusu neighbourhood of Bodrum. The stadium was originally constructed between May 2012 and February 2014 under a project by Bodrum Municipality, with the aim of meeting TFF league standards for 1. Lig.

The venue has a seating capacity of approximately 3,900 to 4,200, with full cover across its four stands, a full natural grass pitch measuring 105 × 68 m, and video surveillance systems. Before the 2024–25 Süper Lig season, floodlight systems which previously did not meet top-flight standards were upgraded to comply with league requirements.

To host Süper Lig matches, Bodrum Municipality completed infrastructure enhancements that included improvements to seating, lighting, and technical facilities, aligning the stadium with the Turkish Football Federation’s criteria for top-tier venues. With these upgrades, Bodrum İlçe Stadyumu became officially eligible to host Süper Lig fixtures, marking a significant milestone for both Bodrum FK and the Bodrum region in football infrastructure.

== Colors and Crest ==
Bodrum FK’s traditional colours are green and white, a palette that has come to symbolize both the club and the town local coverage even described Bodrum “turning green-and-white” during the top-flight promotion celebrations. The colour identity is reflected consistently across merchandise and kit launches; the club’s official store and recent shirt releases foreground green and white in their designs. Local reporting also notes that earlier in the club’s history alternative colours were used before the green-white scheme was standardised under the municipality-supported era of the club.

The current crest is a shield bearing the founding year “1931” and combines stylised battlements — referencing the landmark Bodrum Castle — with wave/boat motifs that point to the peninsula’s maritime heritage. Graphic analyses of Turkish club emblems describe this castle-and-sea iconography as a consistent identity thread from the municipal era to the modern badge. The emphasis on 1931 as the year of foundation is regularly highlighted in club communications and local media coverage.

== Current squad ==
As of 23 September 2026

Note: Flags indicate national team as defined under FIFA eligibility rules; some limited exceptions apply. Players may hold more than one non-FIFA nationality.

No.	Pos.	Nation	Player
1	GK	POR	Diogo Sousa
4	DF	TUR	Ali Şahin Yılmaz
5	DF	ALB	Arlind Ajeti
6	MF	LUX	Tomás Moreira
8	MF	TUR	Mustafa Erdilman
9	FW	TUR	Kerem Kayaarası
10	FW	BRA	Fernando Andrade
11	FW	TUR	Ege Bilsel
14	MF	KOS	Florian Loshaj
17	MF	TUR	Ege Arslan
19	FW	TUR	Berkay Aslan (on loan from Başakşehir)
20	MF	TUR	Yusuf Sertkaya
21	MF	TUR	Ahmet Aslan
23	DF	TUR	Furkan Apaydın
25	FW	TUR	Adem Metin Türk

No.	Pos.	Nation	Player
26	FW	CMR	Vincent Aboubakar
27	MF	TUR	Kartal Cengizer
30	MF	KOS	Elvir Gashijan
32	GK	TUR	Bahri Can Tosun
34	DF	TUR	Ali Aytemur
42	MF	TUR	Kenan Fakılı (on loan from Çorum)
48	FW	TUR	Celal Dumanlı
52	FW	TUR	Devrim Şahin (on loan from Beşiktaş)
54	GK	TUR	Rüzgar Adıyaman
68	DF	TUR	İsmail Tarım
70	MF	TUR	Enes Koç
75	DF	TUR	Emre Kaplan
77	DF	TUR	Berşan Yavuzay
80	MF	HAI	Ruben Providence
82	MF	TUR	Boran Başkan

=== Out on loan ===
Note: Flags indicate national team as defined under FIFA eligibility rules; some limited exceptions apply. Players may hold more than one non-FIFA nationality.

No.	Pos.	Nation	Player
—	GK	TUR	Baran Demir (at Şanlıurfaspor until 30 June 2027)
—	DF	TUR	Oğulcan Başol (at Isparta 32 SK until 30 June 2027)
—	DF	TUR	Enes Öğrüce (at Serikspor until 30 June 2027)

No.	Pos.	Nation	Player
—	MF	TUR	Tunahan Akpınar ({{at Ankara Demirspor until 30 June 2027}})
—	FW	TUR	Emirhan Arkutcu (at 68 Aksaray Belediyespor until 30 June 2027)

== Honours ==
- 1. Lig (second tier)
  - Play-off winner: 2023–24
- 2. Lig (third tier)
  - Play-off winner: 2021–22
- 3. Lig (fourth tier)
  - Winners: 2016–17

== Statistics ==
=== Results of League and Cup Competitions by Season ===
Season	League table										Turkish Cup	Top scorer	
Season	League	Pos	P	W	D	L	GF	GA	GD	Pts	Turkish Cup	Player	Goals
1931–1995	~~The club participated in the Amateur League during these years, with no official league statistics recorded.~~												
1995–96	3. Lig	14th↓	26	6	3	17	27	46	–19	21	~~N/A.~~	~~N/A.~~	~~N/A.~~
1996–2009	~~The club participated in the Amateur League during these years, with no official league statistics recorded.~~												
2009–10	SAL	5th	18	6	5	7	34	21	13	21	~~N/A.~~	~~N/A.~~	~~N/A.~~
2010–11	SAL	1st (Note: Bodrum FK finished the regular season in first place, but failed to secure promotion after losing the play-off final for the BAL.)	16	13	2	1	43	10	+33	41	~~N/A.~~	~~N/A.~~	~~N/A.~~
2011–12	SAL	1st↑	24	19	3	2	70	14	+56	60	~~N/A.~~	~~N/A.~~	~~N/A.~~
2012–13	BAL	2nd	28	19	6	3	71	19	+52	63	~~N/A.~~	Nedim Burak Yıldırım	28
2013–14	BAL	4th	28	16	7	5	64	34	+30	55	~~N/A.~~	Hasan Karaduman	12
2014–15	BAL	1st↑	26	20	6	0	54	13	+41	66	~~N/A.~~	Onur Algül	9
2015–16	3. Lig	3rd	36	17	9	10	48	23	+25	60	R2	Mümin Aysever	21
2016–17	3. Lig	1st↑	34	19	8	7	59	31	+28	65	R2	Mümin Aysever	15
2017–18	2. Lig	14th	34	10	8	16	39	53	–14	38	R3	Emre Şahin	7
2018–19	2. Lig	7th	34	16	4	14	56	48	+9	46	L16	Cem Ekinci	16
2019–20	2. Lig	11th	28	10	6	12	40	41	–1	36	R4	Celal Dumanlı	7
2020–21	2. Lig	6th	38	18	9	11	80	48	+32	63	R3	Ozan Sol	31
2021–22	2. Lig	3rd↑	38	21	9	8	61	27	+34	72	R5	Berk Ünsal	14
2022–23	1. Lig	4th	36	18	8	10	55	34	+21	62	R5	Kenan Özer	14
2023–24	1. Lig	4th↑	34	15	12	7	43	22	+21	57	R5	Gökdeniz Bayrakdar	9
2024–25	Süper Lig	16th↓	36	9	10	17	26	43	–17	37	QF	George Pușcaș	11
2025–26	1. Lig	TBD											

=== League participation ===
- Süper Lig: 2024–2025
- 1. Lig: 2022–24, 2025–
- 2. Lig: 2017–22
- 3. Lig: 1995–96, 2015–17
- BAL: 2012–15
- SAL: 1931–1995, 1996–2012

== Non-playing staff ==
=== Administrative Staff ===
Position	Name
Chairman	(Turkey) Aşkın Demir
Vice Chairman	(Turkey) Selahattin Polat
Deputy Chairman	(Turkey) Taner Ankara
Board member	(Turkey) Mehmet Kocadon
Board member	(Turkey) Abdurrahman Şebik
Board member	(Turkey) Seha Ergene
Board member	(Turkey) Doğan Polat
Board member	(Turkey) Onur Talay
Board member	(Turkey) Kanat Özsert
Board member	(Turkey) Abdullah Başol
Board member	(Turkey) Orhan Dinç
Board member	(Turkey) Ömer Dengiz
Board member	(Turkey) Akın Kılavuz
Board member	(Turkey) İsmail Erdoğan
Board member	(Turkey) Caner Tuna
Board member	(Turkey) Murat Kaya
Board member	(Turkey) Yiğit Demir
Board member	(Turkey) Nurhan Taşan
Board member	(Turkey) Tayyar Gündoğan
Board member	(Turkey) Hasan Polat
Board member	(Turkey) Servet Çavuşoğlu
Board member	(Turkey) Batuhan Ankara
Board member	(Turkey) Can Öztüzün
Board member	(Turkey) Dağlarca Çağlar
Board member	(Turkey) Süleyman Tekgül
Board member	(Turkey) Abdurrahman Çelik
Board member	(Turkey) Yunus Terzioğlu
Board member	(Turkey) Murat Kavak
Board member	(Turkey) Mustafa Akıncı
Board member	(Turkey) Saim Sanlı
Board member	(Turkey) Kamil Bacı
Board member	(Turkey) Ahmet Çelik
Board member	(Turkey) Mehmet Büyük

=== Coaching staff ===
Position	Name
Head coach	(Turkey) Burhan Eşer
Technical Supervisor	(Turkey) Sefer Yılmaz
Assistant Coach	(Turkey) Adem Koçak
Goalkeeper Coach	(Turkey) Murat Öztürk
Performance Coach	(Turkey) Ali Gürsel
Performance Coach	(Turkey) Ziya Güler
Match Analyst	(Turkey) Kaan Karakaş
Scout	(Turkey) Niyazi Küçüker
Sporting Director	(Turkey) Hayati Şenkaya
Translator	(Turkey) Tolga Kaplan
Physiotherapist	(Turkey) Asker İlker Ay
Kit Man	(Turkey) Necatin Mutluer
Kit Man	(Turkey) Tolga Karataş
Kit Man	(Turkey) Sefer Güreller

== Player Statistics ==
Most Appearances				Top Goalscorers				
No	Player	Matches	Season	No	Player	Goals	Matches	Season
1	Erkan Değişmez	140	2014–	1	Nedim Burak Yıldırım	37	40	2010–2014
2	Celal Dumanlı	136	2012–	2	Mümin Aysever	36	51	2015–2017
3	Tolga Deniz	113	2014–2018	3	Celal Dumanlı	23	136	2012–
4	Agah Oktay Yılmaz	111	2014–2018	4	Çağrı Tekin	18	34	2016–2018
5	Erhan Karayer	97	2015–2018	5	Serhat Çiçek	17	33	2011–2014
6	Mehmet Bağlı	90	2015–2018	6	Cem Ekinci	16	38	2018–2019
7	Emrah Öztürk	73	2015–2018	7	Göksu Türkdoğan	14	33	2018–
8	Emre Şahin	64	2017–	8	Onur Algül	14	55	2014–2016
9	Taner Tamince	64	2014–2016	9	Hasan Karaduman	12	25	2013–2014
10	Harun Kavaklıdere	59	2016–	10	Emre Şahin	11	64	2017–

== Ownership and legal status ==
Bodrum FK’s professional football operations are run through Bodrum Futbol Kulübü A.Ş., a joint-stock company registered with the Turkish Football Federation

Following the rebrand from “Bodrum Belediyesi Bodrumspor” to Bodrum FK, businessman Fikret Öztürk (co-founder of Opet) served as club chairman and the principal backer for several seasons. In June 2025, Öztürk stepped aside to become honorary president, and Aşkın Demir was appointed/elected as the new club chairman, as announced by the club and reported in the national press. The club’s day-to-day governance (board composition, executive roles and committees) is published on its official website and updated following general assemblies.
