= 2022–23 Ankara Keçiörengücü S.K. season =

Ankara Keçiörengücü S.K.
2022–23 season
- Chairman: Sedat Tahiroğlu
- Manager: Taner Taşkın (until 24 December 2022); Ahmet Cingöz (from 25 December 2022 to 29 March 2023); Tacettin Bakacak (from 30 March 2023)
- Stadium: Ankara Aktepe Stadium
- TFF First League: 9th
- Turkish Cup: Fifth round
- Top goalscorer: League: Rashad Muhammed (10); All: Rashad Muhammed (10)

The 2022–23 season was the 36th season in the existence of Ankara Keçiörengücü S.K. and the club's fourth consecutive season in the second division of Turkish football. In addition to the domestic league, Ankara Keçiörengücü S.K. participated in this season's edition of the Turkish Cup. The season covers the period from 1 July 2022 to 30 June 2023.

== Players ==
=== First-team squad ===
As of 27 January 2023

Note: Flags indicate national team as defined under FIFA eligibility rules; some limited exceptions apply. Players may hold more than one non-FIFA nationality.

No.	Pos.	Nation	Player
3	DF	TUR	Muharrem Cinan
4	DF	TUR	Aykut Demir
6	MF	TUR	Aykut Çeviker
7	FW	TUR	Hamza Gür
8	MF	TUR	Abdullah Aydın (on loan from Beşiktaş)
9	FW	FRA	Rashad Muhammed
11	MF	ALB	Jurgen Bardhi
12	FW	MLI	Aly Mallé (on loan from Eyüpspor)
16	DF	TUR	Muhammed Sarikaya (on loan from Başakşehir)
17	FW	TUR	Melih İnan
20	MF	TUR	Mikail Okyar (on loan from Eyüpspor)
23	FW	TUR	Musa Aktas
27	FW	GER	Selim Gündüz
29	FW	FRA	Malaly Dembélé

No.	Pos.	Nation	Player
30	MF	ALB	Uerdi Mara
34	GK	TUR	Boran Güngör
41	DF	TUR	Haşim Sarman
57	DF	TUR	Batuhan Yayıkcı
60	MF	TUR	Bekir Karadeniz (on loan from Pendikspor)
67	DF	TUR	Mete Çelik
71	GK	TUR	Metin Uçar
88	GK	TUR	Batuhan Atac
89	DF	TUR	Erkam Reşmen
98	FW	BRA	Anderson Cordeiro
99	FW	NGR	Patrick Friday Eze

=== Out on loan ===
Note: Flags indicate national team as defined under FIFA eligibility rules; some limited exceptions apply. Players may hold more than one non-FIFA nationality.

No.	Pos.	Nation	Player
—	GK	TUR	Taha Ayan (at 52 Orduspor until 30 June 2023)
—	DF	TUR	Görkem Akdere (at Hacettepe 1945 SK until 30 June 2023)
—	DF	TUR	Ogün Bayrak (at Tuzlaspor until 30 June 2023)
—	DF	TUR	Bilal Budak (at Beyoğlu Yeni Çarşı until 30 June 2023)

No.	Pos.	Nation	Player
—	DF	TUR	Halil İbrahim Keleş (at 1954 Kelkit Belediyespor until 30 June 2023)
—	MF	TUR	Berkan Turan (at Kastamonuspor 1966 until 30 June 2023)
—	FW	TUR	Batuhan Ulutaş (at Nevşehir Belediyespor until 30 June 2023)
—	FW	TUR	Musa Yüksel (at Hacettepe 1945 SK until 30 June 2023)

== Transfers ==
=== In ===
Pos.	Player	Transferred from	Fee	Date	Source
MF	(Albania) Uerdi Mara	(Albania) Skënderbeu Korçë	€150,000	1 July 2022	
MF	(Albania) Jurgen Bardhi	(Turkey) Tuzlaspor	Free	1 July 2022	
FW	(Albania) Bekim Balaj	(Turkey) Boluspor	Free	17 July 2022	
FW	(France) Malaly Dembélé	(Turkey) Bandırmaspor	Free	18 January 2023	

=== Out ===
Pos.	Player	Transferred to	Fee	Date	Source
FW	(Albania) Bekim Balaj	(Albania) Vllaznia	Free	14 January 2023	
MF	(Albania) Uerdi Mara	(Bulgaria) Beroe Stara Zagora	Loan	29 January 2023	

== Pre-season and friendlies ==
Win Draw Loss Fixtures

== Competitions ==
=== Overall record ===
Competition	First match	Last match	Starting round	Final position	Record							
Competition	First match	Last match	Starting round	Final position	Pld	W	D	L	GF	GA	GD	Win %
TFF First League	12 August 2022	20 May 2023	Matchday 1	9th	36	16	8	12	59	47	+12	44.44
Turkish Cup	19 October 2022	22 December 2022	Third round	Fifth round	3	2	0	1	8	4	+4	66.67
Total					39	18	8	13	67	51	+16	46.15

Source: Soccerway

=== TFF First League ===
==== League table ====
Pos	Team	Pld	W	D	L	GF	GA	GD	Pts	Qualification or relegation
7	Göztepe (Note: Göztepe vs. Altay was suspended following an attack on a goalkeeper in the 22nd minute. On 9 December 2022, TFF stated that both sides would be considered defeated 3−0. Also, Altay have been deducted 3 points by the Club Licensing Board for failing to meet the licensing requirements.)	36	17	9	10	45	31	+14	60	Qualification for the Süper Lig Playoff Quarter Finals
8	Manisa	36	15	11	10	53	47	+6	56 (Note: Head-to-head points: Manisa 0–0 Ankara Keçiörengücü, Ankara Keçiörengücü 0–3 Manisa)	
9	Keçiörengücü	36	16	8	12	59	47	+12	56	
10	Bandırmaspor	36	15	10	11	55	58	−3	55	
11	Boluspor	36	14	10	12	44	46	−2	52	

Source: TFF
Rules for classification: 1) Points; 2) Head-to-head points; 3) Head-to-head goal difference; 4) Head-to-head goals scored; 5) Goal difference; 6) Goals scored

==== Results summary ====
Overall								Home						Away					
Pld	W	D	L	GF	GA	GD	Pts	W	D	L	GF	GA	GD	W	D	L	GF	GA	GD
36	16	8	12	59	47	+12	56	8	5	5	29	24	+5	8	3	7	30	23	+7

Source: Spor Toto 1. Lig

==== Results by round ====
Round	1	2	3	4	5	6	7	8	9	10	11	12	13	14	15	16	17	18	19	20	21	22	23	24	25	26	27	28	29	30	31	32	33	34	35	36	37	38
Ground	A	H	A	H	A	H	A	H	A	H	A		A	H	H	A	H	A	H	H	A	H	A	H	A	H	A	H	A	H		H	A	A	H	A	H	A
Result	D	L	W	W	D	W	W	D	W	L	W	B	L	W	D	D	W	L	W	D	W	D	L	W	W	W	L	D	L	L	B	L	W	L	L	W	W	L
Position	9	15	8	3	6	3	1	2	1	4	2	3	6	3	4	5	4	6	4	4	3	4	6	5	4	3	5	6	6	6	7	8	8	8	10	9	8	9

Source: Spor Toto 1. Lig
A = Away; H = Home; B = Bye; W = Win; D = Draw; L = Loss

==== Matches ====
The league schedule was released on 5 July.

13 August 2022 1	Çaykur Rizespor	1–1	Ankara Keçiörengücü	Rize
19:15 TRT (UTC+3)	Koç (yellow card) 30'; Papa 48'	Report	Olawoyin (yellow card) 39'; Demir (yellow card) 45+1'; Muhammed 71'	Stadium: Çaykur Didi Stadium; Attendance: 4,547; Referee: Turgut Doman

21 August 2022 2	Ankara Keçiörengücü	1–3	Bodrumspor	Ankara
16:30 TRT (UTC+3)	Kartal (yellow card) 80'; İnan 82'	Report	Erol 3'; Mohammed (yellow card) 27'; Dumanlı 29'; Özer (yellow card) 90'; Reşmen 90+1' (o.g.)	Stadium: Aktepe Stadium; Attendance: 1,635; Referee: Mehmet Türkmen

28 August 2022 3	Altay	1–3	Ankara Keçiörengücü	İzmir
21:45 TRT (UTC+3)	Sarıkaya (yellow card) 24'; Björkander (yellow card) 56'; Gülselam (yellow card) 61'; Paixão 80'; Yıldırım (yellow card) 83'	Report	Gür 22'; Yokuşlu 56' (o.g.); Yayıkcı (yellow card) 63'; Karadeniz 81'; Balaj (yellow card) 87'	Stadium: Alsancak Mustafa Denizli Stadium; Referee: Eren Özyemişcioğlu

4 September 2022 4	Ankara Keçiörengücü	2–1	Sakaryaspor	Ankara
16:30 TRT (UTC+3)	Olawoyin 76'; Muhammed 79'	Report	Odabaşoğlu (yellow card) 45+2'; Kasongo 84'; Kurt (yellow card) 90'	Stadium: Aktepe Stadium; Referee: Abdullah Buğra Taşkınsoy

10 September 2022 5	Bandırmaspor	2–2	Ankara Keçiörengücü	Balıkesir
16:30 TRT (UTC+3)	Çiçek 49'; Özcan (yellow card) 62'; Kuruçuk (yellow card) 79'; Cavlan (yellow card) 82'	Report	Muhammed (yellow card) 1'; Gür 22'; Karadeniz 39'; Babaei (yellow card) 87'	Stadium: Bandırma 17 Eylül Stadium; Referee: Kutluhan Bilgiç

17 September 2022 6	Ankara Keçiörengücü	3–2	Erzurumspor	Ankara
13:30 TRT (UTC+3)	Olanare 6' (o.g.); Demir 34'; Cinan 64'; Karadeniz (yellow card) 80'; İnan (yellow card) 90+3'	Report	Tozlu 20', 76'; Yumlu (yellow card) 57'	Stadium: Aktepe Stadium; Referee: Caner Ak

2 October 2022 7	Altınordu	1–4	Ankara Keçiörengücü	İzmir
19:00 TRT (UTC+3)	Fındıklı 6'; Kaya (yellow card) 45'	Report	Gür 16'; Okyar 36'; Karadeniz 45+1' (pen.); Camara 55'; Demir (yellow card) 65'; Bardhi (yellow card) 80'	Stadium: Bornova Aziz Kocaoğlu Stadium; Referee: Murat Erdoğan

8 October 2022 8	Ankara Keçiörengücü	1–1	Boluspor	Ankara
13:30 TRT (UTC+3)	Muhammed (yellow card) 18'; Okyar (yellow card) 50'; Yayıkcı 72' (yellow card) 89'; Bardhi (yellow card) 74'	Report	Ulaş (yellow card) 19'; Kacar (yellow card) 35'; Alsan 43'; Akbaba (yellow card) 72'	Stadium: Aktepe Stadium; Referee: Onur Özütoprak

15 October 2022 9	Gençlerbirliği	0–2	Ankara Keçiörengücü	Ankara
19:00 TRT (UTC+3)	Bayır (yellow card) 36'; Erdem (yellow card) 42'; Alıcı (yellow card) 45+1'; Kahya (yellow card) 83'	Report	Muhammed 45'; İnan (yellow card) 85', (goal) 89'	Stadium: Eryaman Stadium; Referee: Turgut Doman

22 October 2022 10	Ankara Keçiörengücü	0–3	Pendikspor	Ankara
13:30 TRT (UTC+3)	Kartal (yellow card) 30'; Babaei (yellow card) 51'; Bardhi (yellow card) 54'; Uçar (yellow card) 82'; Cinan (yellow card) 90'	Report	Özgenç (yellow card) 12'; Özdemir 18'; Bitin 45+1' (pen.); Regattin 85'	Stadium: Aktepe Stadium; Referee: Emre Kargın

30 October 2022 11	Tuzlaspor	1–3	Ankara Keçiörengücü	Istanbul
13:30 TRT (UTC+3)	Mayingila N'Zuzi Mata 7'; Rajko Rotman (yellow card) 74'; Erol Can Akdağ (yellow card) 79'	Report	Muhammed 21', 32'; Yayıkcı (yellow card) 31'; Balaj 90+1'	Stadium: Sancaktepe Stadium; Referee: Direnç Tonusluoğlu

12	Bye

14 November 2022 13	Göztepe	2–1	Ankara Keçiörengücü	İzmir
20:00 TRT (UTC+3)	Nukan (yellow card) 35'; Öztekin 39' (pen.); Kvasina (yellow card) 49'; Çamdal (yellow card) 74'; Palmer 77'	Report	Muhammed 24'; İnan (yellow card) 43'; Kartal (yellow card) 74'	Stadium: Gürsel Aksel Stadium; Referee: Mehmet Türkmen

19 November 2022 14	Ankara Keçiörengücü	2–0	Denizlispor	Ankara
13:30 TRT (UTC+3)	Muhammed 38'; Olawoyin (yellow card) 45+2' (goal) 56'; Kartal (yellow card) 61'	Report		Stadium: Aktepe Stadium; Referee: Oğuzhan Çakır

27 November 2022 15	Ankara Keçiörengücü	1–1	Samsunspor	Ankara
13:30 TRT (UTC+3)	Muhammed (yellow card) 39'; Karadeniz (yellow card) 43'; Olawoyin 54' (pen.); Babaei (yellow card) 75'	Report	Laura 14'; Tanque (yellow card) 31'; Güneren (yellow card) 70'; Çift (yellow card) 72'	Stadium: Aktepe Stadium; Referee: Tugay Kaan Numanoğlu

4 December 2022 16	Manisa	0–0	Ankara Keçiörengücü	Manisa
13:30 TRT (UTC+3)	Karapo (yellow card) 43'; Altıparmak (yellow card) 75'; Büyük (yellow card) 76'; Kör (yellow card) 90+3'	Report	Bardhi (yellow card) 45'; Cinan (red card) 90+4'	Stadium: Mümin Özkasap Stadium; Referee: Oğuzhan Aksu

10 December 2022 17	Ankara Keçiörengücü	1–0	Adanaspor	Ankara
13:30 TRT (UTC+3)	Kartal (yellow card) 37'; Sarman (yellow card) 45+2'; Reşmen 57'	Report	Iseka (yellow card) 37'; Bennasser (penalty missed) 38'; Güveli (yellow card) 76'; Roche (yellow card) 86'	Stadium: Aktepe Stadium; Referee: Reşat Onur Coşkunses

17 December 2022 18	Yeni Malatyaspor	1–0	Ankara Keçiörengücü	Malatya
16:00 TRT (UTC+3)	Osman 1'; Özçiçek (yellow card) 63'; Akgün (yellow card) 86'; Gameli (red card) 90+2'; Damlu (yellow card) 90+6'	Report	Eze (red card) 90+2'	Stadium: New Malatya Stadium; Referee: Tarık Güldal

25 December 2022 19	Ankara Keçiörengücü	2–1	Eyüpspor	Ankara
13:30 TRT (UTC+3)	Kartal (yellow card) 45+3'; Reşmen 61'; İnan 71'; Cinan (yellow card) 78'; Uçar (yellow card) 87'; Babaei (yellow card) 90+2'	Report	Babel 6'; Bayram (yellow card) 60'	Stadium: Aktepe Stadium; Referee: Emre Kargın

14 January 2023 20	Ankara Keçiörengücü	1–1	Çaykur Rizespor	Ankara
13:30 TRT (UTC+3)	İnan 68' (pen.); Yayıkcı (yellow card) 89'; Kartal (yellow card) 90+6'	Report	Bolasie 77'; Yılmaz (yellow card) 90+1'; Öztürk (yellow card) 90+7'	Stadium: Aktepe Stadium; Referee: Mehmet Türkmen

22 January 2023 21	Bodrumspor	1–2	Ankara Keçiörengücü	Muğla
13:30 TRT (UTC+3)	Kılınç (yellow card) 10'; Özer 49' (pen.), (yellow card) 88'; Akbay (yellow card) 64'	Report	İnan 26', (yellow card) 85'; Kartal (yellow card) 49'; Karadeniz 75'; Uçar (yellow card) 90+2'; Reşmen (yellow card) 90+7'	Stadium: Bodrum İlçe Stadium; Referee: Ozan Ergün

29 January 2023 22	Ankara Keçiörengücü	1–1	Altay	Ankara
13:30 TRT (UTC+3)	Cinan (yellow card) 40' (yellow-red card) 89'; Dembélé 50'	Report	Paixão 48'; Öztürk (yellow card) 81'; Naderi (yellow card) 88'	Stadium: Aktepe Stadium; Referee: Raşit Yorgancılar

5 February 2023 23	Sakaryaspor	2–0	Ankara Keçiörengücü	Sakarya
19:00 TRT (UTC+3)	Roshi (yellow card) 23'; Kasongo 45+6' (pen.), 90+8'; Has (yellow card) 78'	Report	Kartal (yellow card) 54'; (yellow card) 64' (yellow-red card) 83' Sarman; Reşmen (yellow card) 90+3'	Stadium: New Sakarya Atatürk Stadium; Referee: Kutluhan Bilgiç

4 March 2023 24	Ankara Keçiörengücü	3–1	Bandırmaspor	Ankara
13:30 TRT (UTC+3)	İnan (penalty missed) 18'; Yayıkcı (yellow card) 23'; Dembélé (yellow card) 45+1'; Yardımcı (yellow card) 45+5'; Karadeniz (yellow card) 45+6', (goal) 74'; Muhammed 77'; Anderson 90+4', (yellow card) 90+4'	Report	Mulumba (yellow card) 45+5'; Aktaş (yellow card) 45+5'; Šaponjić 59'	Stadium: Aktepe Stadium; Referee: Reşat Onur Coşkunses

8 March 2023 25	Erzurumspor	0–1	Ankara Keçiörengücü	Erzurum
14:30 TRT (UTC+3)	Yumlu (yellow card) 41'	Report	Yayıkcı (yellow card) 69'; Özhan 87' (o.g.)	Stadium: Kazım Karabekir Stadium; Referee: Yunus Dursun

12 March 2023 26	Ankara Keçiörengücü	4–0	Altınordu	Ankara
13:30 TRT (UTC+3)	Karadeniz 12'; Dembélé 59'; Mallé 61'; Anderson 90+2'	Report	Özek (yellow card) 13'; Arslan (yellow card) 34'; Gökçe (red card) 77'; Sürmeli (yellow card) 93'	Stadium: Aktepe Stadium; Referee: İlker Yasin Avcı

19 March 2023 27	Boluspor	3–1	Ankara Keçiörengücü	Bolu
16:00 TRT (UTC+3)	Bregu (yellow card) 34', (goal) 51'; Posmac 61'; Kayamba (yellow card) 86'; Kaçar (yellow card) 88'; Ndlovu 90+6'	Report	Dembélé 5'; Muhammed (yellow card) 50'; Uçar (yellow card) 84'; Çeviker (yellow card) 88'	Stadium: Bolu Atatürk Stadium; Referee: Emre Kargın

25 March 2023 28	Ankara Keçiörengücü	2–2	Gençlerbirliği	Ankara
13:30 TRT (UTC+3)	Mallé (yellow card) 22'; Ikić 45+2' (o.g.); Dembélé 57', (yellow card) 70'; Karadeniz (yellow card) 90+4'	Report	Durak (yellow card) 18'; Demir 24'; Akdemir (red card) 36'; Rharsalla (yellow card) 45+1'; Ayoví (yellow card) 45+3'; Fontaine (yellow card) 50'; Torje (yellow card) 83'	Stadium: Aktepe Stadium; Referee: Alper Akarsu

28 March 2023 29	Pendikspor	2–1	Ankara Keçiörengücü	Istanbul
17:00 TRT (UTC+3)	Hatipoğlu (yellow card) 45+2', (goal) 70', 78'; Bitin (yellow card) 83'; Öztorun (yellow card) 84'; Aosman (yellow card) 87'; Özdemir (yellow card) 90+4'	Report	Aydın (yellow card) 13'; Mallé 17', (yellow card) 27'; Muhammed (red card) 45+2'; Yayıkcı (yellow card) 64'; Reşmen (yellow card) 80'	Stadium: Pendik Stadium; Referee: Yiğit Arslan

2 April 2023 30	Ankara Keçiörengücü	0–1	Tuzlaspor	Ankara
13:30 TRT (UTC+3)	Dembélé (penalty missed) 53'	Report	N'Zuzi Mata 3'; Awuku (yellow card) 52'; Bayrak (yellow card) 55'; Bayır (yellow card) 76'	Stadium: Aktepe Stadium; Referee: Ali Yılmaz

31	Bye

11 April 2023 32	Ankara Keçiörengücü	2–3	Göztepe	Ankara
13:30 TRT (UTC+3)	Bardhi (yellow card) 17'; İnan 64', (yellow card) 90+6'; Aktaş 66'	Report	Nukan 10', (yellow card) 39'; Mamah 52'; Mihojević 82'; Traoré (yellow card) 88'; Gedik (yellow card) 90+6'	Stadium: Aktepe Stadium; Referee: Çağdaş Altay

15 April 2023 33	Denizlispor	0–4	Ankara Keçiörengücü	Denizli
20:30 TRT (UTC+3)	Çeçenoğlu (yellow card) 16'	Report	Muhammed 17' (pen.), 83' (pen.), (yellow card) 54'; Gür (yellow card) 38'; Dembélé 45+1', (red card) 45+3'; Aktaş 85'	Stadium: Denizli Atatürk Stadium; Referee: Alpaslan Şen

23 April 2023 34	Samsunspor	4–1	Ankara Keçiörengücü	Samsun
16:00 TRT (UTC+3)	Albayrak 39'; Tanque 54'; Aydoğdu (yellow card) 60'; Çelik 63'; Fofana 66'	Report	Cinan (yellow card) 21'; Reşmen (yellow card) 34'; Anderson 82'	Stadium: Samsun Stadium; Referee: Oğuzhan Aksu

29 April 2023 35	Ankara Keçiörengücü	0–3	Manisa	Ankara
13:30 TRT (UTC+3)	Yayıkcı (yellow card) 8'; Karadeniz (yellow card) 71'; Anderson (yellow card) 77'	Report	Gakpa 34'; Domgjoni (yellow card) 69'; Tetik (yellow card) 79'; Çoban 80', (yellow card) 80'; Uysal 90+1'	Stadium: Aktepe Stadium; Referee: Hüseyin Göçek

36	Adanaspor	0–3 (w/o)	Ankara Keçiörengücü	Adana
		Report		Stadium: New Adana Stadium

37	Ankara Keçiörengücü	3–0 (w/o)	Yeni Malatyaspor	Ankara
		Report		Stadium: Aktepe Stadium

21 May 2023 38	Eyüpspor	2–1	Ankara Keçiörengücü	Istanbul
16:00 TRT (UTC+3)	Alkılıç 25'; Babel (yellow card) 53', (goal) 69'; Öztürk (yellow card) 58'; Kabasakal (yellow card) 71'	Report	Uçar (yellow card) 45'; Reşmen 56'; Cinan (yellow card) 62'	Stadium: Eyüp Stadium; Referee: Ümit Öztürk

=== Turkish Cup ===
19 October 2022 Third round	Ankara Keçiörengücü	4–1	Diyarbekirspor	Ankara
14:00 TRT (UTC+3)	Mara 4' (pen.); Eze 65'; İnan 66'; Balaj 90+3'	Report	Karakuş 71'	Stadium: Aktepe Stadium; Referee: Alper Oran

9 November 2022 Fourth round	Ankara Keçiörengücü	4–2	Bulvarspor	Ankara
13:00 TRT (UTC+3)	Babaei 8', 41'; İnan 63'; Balaj 81'	Report	Can 47', 87'	Stadium: Aktepe Stadium; Referee: Ayberk Demirbaş

22 December 2022 Round of 16	Galatasaray	1–0	Ankara Keçiörengücü	Istanbul
21:00 TRT (UTC+3)	Seferovic (penalty missed) 41'; Gomis 82'; Muslera (yellow card) 90+4'	Report	Camara (yellow card) 20'; Muhammed (yellow card) 60'	Stadium: Nef Stadium; Referee: Çağdaş Altay
