= 2026–27 in Turkish football =

2026–27 Turkish football season

Football in Turkey
- Season: 2026–27

The 2026–27 season will be the 122nd season of competitive football in Turkey.

== National teams ==
=== Turkey men's national football team ===
==== 2026–27 UEFA Nations League ====
===== Group 1 =====
Pos	Team	Pld	W	D	L	GF	GA	GD	Pts	Qualification or relegation	(France)	(Italy)	(Belgium)	(Turkey)
1	France (W)	4	3	1	0	7	2	+5	10	Advance to quarter-finals	—	1–1	4–1	15 Nov
2	Italy (X)	4	2	1	1	8	5	+3	7	Advance to quarter-finals	12 Nov	—	0–2	3–1
3	Belgium	4	2	0	2	6	5	+1	6	Possible qualification for relegation play-offs	0–1	15 Nov	—	3–0
4	Turkey (Y)	4	0	0	4	2	11	−9	0	Qualification for relegation play-offs or relegation to League B	0–1	1–4	12 Nov	—

Updated to match(es) played on 5 October 2026. Source: UEFA
Rules for classification: Tiebreakers
(W) Safe from relegation; (X) Safe from direct relegation; (Y) Can at best finish third

25 September 2026	Turkey	0–1	France	İzmit, Turkey
21:45 TRT (UTC+03:00)		Report	Mbappé 54'	Stadium: Kocaeli Stadium; Attendance: 28,205; Referee: Felix Zwayer (Germany)

28 September 2026	Turkey	1–4	Italy	Bursa, Turkey
21:45 TRT (UTC+03:00)	Yılmaz 47'	Report	Bastoni 9'; Frattesi 22'; Kayode 27'; Esposito 50'	Stadium: Centennial Atatürk Stadium; Attendance: 33,891; Referee: Michael Oliver (England)

2 October 2026	Belgium	3–0	Turkey	Liège, Belgium
20:45 CEST (UTC+02:00)	De Bruyne 10', 59'; Lukaku 76'	Report		Stadium: Stade Maurice Dufrasne; Attendance: 24,386; Referee: Rohit Saggi (Norway)

5 October 2026	Italy	3–1	Turkey	Bologna, Italy
20:45 CEST (UTC+02:00)	Scamacca 26'; Calafiori 65'; P. Esposito 87'	Report	Şimşir 61'	Stadium: Stadio Renato Dall'Ara; Attendance: 30,040; Referee: Szymon Marciniak (Poland)

12 November 2026	Turkey	v	Belgium	İzmir, Turkey
20:00 TRT (UTC+03:00)		Report		Stadium: Gürsel Aksel Stadium

15 November 2026	France	v	Turkey	Bordeaux, France
20:45 CET (UTC+01:00)		Report		Stadium: Stade Atlantique

=== Turkey women's national football team ===
==== 2027 FIFA Women's World Cup qualification – UEFA play-offs ====
Team 1	Agg.	Team 2	1st leg	2nd leg
Turkey	3–5	Slovenia	3–3	0–2

9 October 2026	Turkey	3–3	Slovenia	Istanbul, Turkey
19:00 TRT (UTC+03:00)		Report		Stadium: Pendik Stadium

13 October 2026	Slovenia	2–0	Turkey	Domžale, Slovenia
17:00 CEST (UTC+02:00)		Report		Stadium: Domžale Sports Park

== UEFA competitions ==
=== UEFA Champions League ===
==== Qualifying round ====
===== Second qualifying round =====
Team 1	Agg.	Team 2	1st leg	2nd leg
Fenerbahçe (Turkey)	2–1	(Poland) Górnik Zabrze	1–0	1–1

===== Third qualifying round =====
Team 1	Agg.	Team 2	1st leg	2nd leg
Fenerbahçe (Turkey)	3–0	(Austria) Sturm Graz	2–0	1–0

===== Play-off round =====
Team 1	Agg.	Team 2	1st leg	2nd leg
Fenerbahçe (Turkey)	3–2	(France) Lyon	1–1	2–1

==== League phase ====
===== Fenerbahçe =====
Pos	Team	Pld	W	D	L	GF	GA	GD	Pts
29	(Greece) AEK Athens	3	1	0	2	3	8	−5	3
29	(Germany) RB Leipzig	3	1	0	2	3	8	−5	3
31	(Turkey) Fenerbahçe	3	0	2	1	3	9	−6	2
32	(Czech Republic) Slavia Prague	3	0	1	2	4	7	−3	1
33	(Norway) Viking	3	0	1	2	5	9	−4	1

Updated to match(es) played on 21 October 2026. Source: UEFA
Rules for classification: League phase tiebreakers

Home team	Score	Away team
Fenerbahçe (Turkey)	1–1	(Italy) Roma
Aston Villa (England)	6–0	(Turkey) Fenerbahçe
Fenerbahçe (Turkey)	2–2	(Czech Republic) Slavia Prague
Fenerbahçe (Turkey)	4 Nov	(England) Liverpool
Shakhtar Donetsk (Ukraine)	25 Nov	(Turkey) Fenerbahçe
LASK (Austria)	9 Dec	(Turkey) Fenerbahçe
Fenerbahçe (Turkey)	20 Jan	(Spain) Villarreal
Atlético Madrid (Spain)	27 Jan	(Turkey) Fenerbahçe

===== Galatasaray =====
Pos	Team	Pld	W	D	L	GF	GA	GD	Pts	Qualification
20	(England) Manchester United	3	1	0	2	5	6	−1	3	Advance to knockout phase play-offs (unseeded)
22	(Italy) Napoli	3	1	0	2	5	7	−2	3	Advance to knockout phase play-offs (unseeded)
23	(Turkey) Galatasaray	3	1	0	2	6	9	−3	3	Advance to knockout phase play-offs (unseeded)
24	(Austria) LASK	3	1	0	2	6	9	−3	3	Advance to knockout phase play-offs (unseeded)
25	(Azerbaijan) Sabah	3	1	0	2	3	6	−3	3	

Updated to match(es) played on 21 October 2026. Source: UEFA
Rules for classification: League phase tiebreakers

Home team	Score	Away team
Sporting CP (Portugal)	3–1	(Turkey) Galatasaray
Galatasaray (Turkey)	1–4	(Spain) Barcelona
Lille (France)	2–4	(Turkey) Galatasaray
Galatasaray (Turkey)	3 Nov	(Germany) VfB Stuttgart
Galatasaray (Turkey)	2–4	(England) Aston Villa
AEK Athens (Greece)	8 Dec	(Turkey) Galatasaray
Galatasaray (Turkey)	19 Jan	(Netherlands) Feyenoord
Paris Saint-Germain (France)	27 Jan	(Turkey) Galatasaray

=== UEFA Europa League ===
==== Qualifying round ====
===== Second qualifying round =====
Team 1	Agg.	Team 2	1st leg	2nd leg
Beşiktaş (Turkey)	3–0	(Denmark) Midtjylland	1–0	2–0

===== Third qualifying round =====
Team 1	Agg.	Team 2	1st leg	2nd leg
Hradec Králové (Czech Republic)	0–2	(Turkey) Beşiktaş	0–1	0–1

===== Play-off round =====
Team 1	Agg.	Team 2	1st leg	2nd leg
Trabzonspor (Turkey)	0–5	(Hungary) Ferencváros	1–0	4–0
Beşiktaş (Turkey)	3–1	(Lithuania) Kauno Žalgiris	3–0	0–1

==== League phase ====
===== Beşiktaş =====
Pos	Team	Pld	W	D	L	GF	GA	GD	Pts	Qualification
6	(Belgium) Union Saint-Gilloise	3	2	1	0	8	1	+7	7	Advance to round of 16 (seeded)
7	(Italy) Juventus	3	2	1	0	9	3	+6	7	Advance to round of 16 (seeded)
8	(Turkey) Beşiktaş	3	2	1	0	9	5	+4	7	Advance to round of 16 (seeded)
9	(England) Sunderland	3	2	1	0	4	2	+2	7	Advance to knockout phase play-offs (seeded)
10	(Netherlands) AZ	3	2	0	1	6	2	+4	6	Advance to knockout phase play-offs (seeded)

Updated to match(es) played on 22 October 2026. Source: UEFA
Rules for classification: League phase tiebreakers

Home team	Score	Away team
Beşiktaş (Turkey)	4–1	(France) Marseille
TSG Hoffenheim (Germany)	2–3	(Turkey) Beşiktaş
Beşiktaş (Turkey)	2–2	(England) Crystal Palace
Celtic (Scotland)	5 Nov	(Turkey) Beşiktaş
Beşiktaş (Turkey)	26 Nov	(Israel) Hapoel Be'er Sheva
Bayer Leverkusen (Germany)	10 Dec	(Turkey) Beşiktaş
Beşiktaş (Turkey)	21 Jan	(Belgium) Union Saint-Gilloise
Omonia (Cyprus)	28 Jan	(Turkey) Beşiktaş

=== UEFA Conference League ===
==== Qualifying round ====
===== Second qualifying round =====
Team 1	Agg.	Team 2	1st leg	2nd leg
İstanbul Başakşehir (Turkey)	1–3	(Finland) Inter Turku	1–1	0–2

==== League phase ====
===== Trabzonspor =====
Pos	Team	Pld	W	D	L	GF	GA	GD	Pts	Qualification
2	(Switzerland) Lugano	2	2	0	0	8	4	+4	6	Advance to round of 16 (seeded)
3	(Norway) Brann	2	2	0	0	6	2	+4	6	Advance to round of 16 (seeded)
3	(Turkey) Trabzonspor	2	2	0	0	6	2	+4	6	Advance to round of 16 (seeded)
5	(Netherlands) Twente	2	2	0	0	5	1	+4	6	Advance to round of 16 (seeded)
6	(France) Monaco	2	2	0	0	5	1	+4	6	Advance to round of 16 (seeded)

Updated to match(es) played on 22 October 2026. Source: UEFA
Rules for classification: League phase tiebreakers

Home team	Score	Away team
KuPS (Finland)	2–4	(Turkey) Trabzonspor
Trabzonspor (Turkey)	2–0	(Scotland) Heart of Midlothian
Trabzonspor (Turkey)	5 Nov	(Germany) SC Freiburg
CSKA Sofia (Bulgaria)	26 Nov	(Turkey) Trabzonspor
Trabzonspor (Turkey)	10 Dec	(Czech Republic) Jablonec
Red Star Belgrade (Serbia)	17 Dec	(Turkey) Trabzonspor

=== UEFA Women's Champions League ===
==== Qualifying round ====
===== Second qualifying round =====
Tournament 5
Team 1	Score	Team 2
Metalist 1925 Kharkiv (Ukraine)	1–2	(Turkey) Fenerbahçe
OH Leuven (Belgium)	1–1 (4–2 p)	(Turkey) Fenerbahçe

== League competitions (Men's) ==
=== Pre–season ===
League	Promoted to league	Relegated from league
Süper Lig	Erzurumspor; Amed; Çorum	Antalyaspor; Kayserispor; Fatih Karagümrük
1. Lig	Batman Petrolspor; Bursaspor; Mardin 1969; Muğlaspor	Serikspor; Sakaryaspor; Hatayspor; Adana Demirspor
2. Lig	12 Bingölspor; İnegöl Kafkasspor; Kütahyaspor; Sebat Gençlikspor; Çorluspor 1947; 52 Orduspor	Adanaspor; Beykoz Anadoluspor; Bucaspor 1928; Karaman; Kepezspor; Yeni Malatyaspor; Yeni Mersin İdmanyurdu
3. Lig	Bigaspor; 1922 Akşehirspor; Gölcükspor; Adaletgücü; Bitlis 1916	1926 Bulancakspor; Afyonspor; Artvin Hopaspor; Bornova 1877; Çankayaspor; Çayelispor; Edirnespor; Giresunspor; İzmir Çoruhlu; Kahramanmaraşspor; Kestel Çilekspor; Kilis 1984; Nazillispor; Polatlı 1926; Suvermez Kapadokyaspor; Türk Metal 1963

=== Süper Lig ===
==== League table ====
Pos	Team	Pld	W	D	L	GF	GA	GD	Pts	Qualification or relegation
1	Galatasaray	8	6	1	1	17	11	+6	19	Qualification for the Champions League league phase
2	Amedspor	8	5	2	1	18	9	+9	17	Qualification for the Champions League third qualifying round
3	Fenerbahçe	8	5	1	2	22	6	+16	16	Qualification for the Europa League second qualifying round
4	Beşiktaş	7	5	0	2	16	8	+8	15	Qualification for the Conference League second qualifying round
5	Trabzonspor	7	4	1	2	16	5	+11	13	
6	Çorum	7	3	1	3	16	12	+4	10	
7	Kocaelispor	7	4	0	3	8	6	+2	12	
8	Alanyaspor	8	3	3	2	8	9	−1	12	
9	Erzurumspor	8	3	2	3	5	11	−6	11	
10	Kasımpaşa	7	2	4	1	8	8	0	10	
11	Rizespor	7	3	1	3	7	9	−2	10	
12	Başakşehir	7	2	2	3	10	11	−1	8	
13	Gaziantep	7	2	2	3	7	10	−3	8	
14	Gençlerbirliği	8	2	2	4	7	16	−9	8	
15	Göztepe	7	1	3	3	15	15	0	6	
16	Konyaspor	8	1	2	5	4	9	−5	5	Relegation to TFF 1. Lig
17	Samsunspor	7	1	1	5	6	15	−9	4	Relegation to TFF 1. Lig
18	Eyüpspor	8	1	0	7	2	22	−20	3	Relegation to TFF 1. Lig

Updated to match(es) played on 17 October 2026. Source: Süper Lig
Rules for classification: 1) Points; 2) Head-to-head points; 3) Head-to-head goal difference; 4) Head-to-head goals scored; 5) Goal difference; 6) Goals scored; 7) Play-off.
(Note: Head-to-head record is used only after all the matches between the teams in question have been played)

=== TFF First league ===
==== League table ====
Pos	Team	Pld	W	D	L	GF	GA	GD	Pts	Qualification or relegation
1	Kayserispor	10	8	1	1	22	5	+17	25	Promotion to the Süper Lig
2	Bursaspor	10	7	1	2	20	9	+11	22	Promotion to the Süper Lig
3	Iğdır	10	6	2	2	14	8	+6	20	Qualification for the Süper Lig Playoff Final
4	Batman Petrolspor	10	6	1	3	20	17	+3	19	Qualification for the Süper Lig Playoff Quarter Finals
5	Mardin 1969	10	5	3	2	12	6	+6	18	Qualification for the Süper Lig Playoff Quarter Finals
6	Keçiörengücü	10	4	5	1	19	10	+9	17	Qualification for the Süper Lig Playoff Quarter Finals
7	Sarıyer	11	4	4	3	14	15	−1	16	Qualification for the Süper Lig Playoff Quarter Finals
8	Antalyaspor	10	5	0	5	15	17	−2	15	
9	Bandırmaspor	11	3	5	3	16	8	+8	14	
10	Bodrumspor	11	3	5	3	13	10	+3	14	
11	Sivasspor	11	2	7	2	15	14	+1	13	
12	Karagümrük	10	3	4	3	13	13	0	13	
13	Muğlaspor	10	2	6	2	9	11	−2	12	
14	Manisa	10	2	4	4	15	16	−1	10	
15	Pendikspor	10	2	4	4	12	19	−7	10	
16	Esenler Erokspor	10	1	6	3	6	11	−5	9	
17	Vanspor	10	2	3	5	10	20	−10	9	Relegation to the TFF 2. Lig
18	Ümraniyespor	9	1	4	4	7	10	−3	7	Relegation to the TFF 2. Lig
19	İstanbulspor	10	1	2	7	9	24	−15	5	Relegation to the TFF 2. Lig
20	Boluspor	9	0	1	8	3	21	−18	1	Relegation to the TFF 2. Lig

Updated to match(es) played on 17 October 2026. Source: TFF,
Rules for classification: 1) Points; 2) Head-to-head points; 3) Head-to-head goal difference; 4) Head-to-head goals scored; 5) Goal difference; 6) Goals scored; 7) Play-off.

=== TFF Second league ===
==== League table ====
===== White Group =====
Pos	Team	Pld	W	D	L	GF	GA	GD	Pts	Qualification or relegation
1	Aliağa	2	2	0	0	6	1	+5	6	Promotion to TFF 1. Lig
2	Elazığspor	2	2	0	0	5	1	+4	6	Qualification for promotion play-offs
3	Güzide Gebzespor	2	2	0	0	3	0	+3	6	Qualification for promotion play-offs
4	Çorluspor 1947	2	1	1	0	5	0	+5	4	Qualification for promotion play-offs
5	Muşspor	2	1	1	0	8	4	+4	4	Qualification for promotion play-offs
6	68 Aksaray Belediyespor	2	1	1	0	6	3	+3	4	
7	Somaspor	2	1	1	0	6	4	+2	4	
8	Şanlıurfaspor	2	1	1	0	4	3	+1	4	
9	İnegöl Kafkasspor	2	1	0	1	4	4	0	3	
10	Ankaraspor	2	1	0	1	2	2	0	3	
11	Erbaaspor	2	0	1	1	5	6	−1	1	
12	Sebatspor	2	0	1	1	4	6	−2	1	
13	Isparta 32	2	0	0	2	1	4	−3	0	
14	Arnavutköy Belediyespor	2	0	0	2	1	5	−4	0	
15	Menemen	2	0	0	2	1	7	−6	0	
16	Kastamonuspor	2	0	0	2	0	8	−8	0	Relegation to TFF 3. Lig
17	Hatayspor (Note: Hatayspor have been deducted 6 points.)	2	0	1	1	0	2	−2	−5	Relegation to TFF 3. Lig
18	Adana Demirspor (Note: Adana Demirspor have been deducted 48 points.)	2	1	0	1	2	3	−1	−45	Relegation to TFF 3. Lig

Updated to match(es) played on 13 September 2026. Source: TFF
Rules for classification: 1) Points; 2) Head-to-head points; 3) Head-to-head goal difference; 4) Head-to-head goals scored; 5) Goal difference; 6) Goals scored

===== Red Group =====
Pos	Team	Pld	W	D	L	GF	GA	GD	Pts	Qualification or relegation
1	52 Orduspor	2	2	0	0	4	0	+4	6	Promotion to TFF 1. Lig
2	Sakaryaspor	2	2	0	0	5	2	+3	6	Qualification for promotion play-offs
3	Ankara Demirspor	2	2	0	0	4	1	+3	6	Qualification for promotion play-offs
4	12 Bingölspor	2	1	1	0	3	2	+1	4	Qualification for promotion play-offs
5	Serikspor	2	1	1	0	3	2	+1	4	Qualification for promotion play-offs
6	Beyoğlu Yeni Çarşı	2	1	1	0	2	1	+1	4	
7	Kütahyaspor	2	1	0	1	5	3	+2	3	
8	Kırklarelispor	1	1	0	0	1	0	+1	3	
9	Erzincanspor	2	0	2	0	5	5	0	2	
10	Kahramanmaraş İstiklalspor	2	0	2	0	2	2	0	2	
11	Karacabey Belediyespor	1	0	1	0	1	1	0	1	
12	İnegölspor	2	0	1	1	3	4	−1	1	
13	Adana 01	2	0	1	1	3	5	−2	1	
14	1461 Trabzon	2	0	0	2	2	4	−2	0	
15	Ankaragücü	2	0	0	2	0	2	−2	0	
16	İskenderunspor	2	0	0	2	1	5	−4	0	Relegation to TFF 3. Lig
17	Fethiyespor	2	0	0	2	1	6	−5	0	Relegation to TFF 3. Lig
18	Altınordu (Note: Altınordu were relegated by the Turkish Football Federation following the club's withdrawal from the league.) (R)	0	0	0	0	0	0	0	0	Relegation to TFF 3. Lig

Updated to match(es) played on 13 September 2026. Source: TFF
Rules for classification: 1) Points; 2) Head-to-head points; 3) Head-to-head goal difference; 4) Head-to-head goals scored; 5) Goal difference; 6) Goals scored
(R) Relegated

== League competitions (Women's) ==
=== Women's Super League ===
Pos	Team	Pld	W	D	L	GF	GA	GD	Pts	Qualification or relegation
1	Fenerbahçe	4	4	0	0	20	0	+20	12	Qualification for the Champions League second qualifying round
2	Galatasaray	5	3	2	0	16	2	+14	11	Qualification for the Europa Cup first qualifying round
3	Amed	5	3	0	2	14	7	+7	9	
4	Beşiktaş	4	3	0	1	8	3	+5	9	
5	Trabzonspor	5	2	3	0	7	3	+4	9	
6	Kayseri	5	2	2	1	13	8	+5	8	
7	Hakkarigücü	5	2	2	1	8	4	+4	8	
8	Yüksekova	5	2	2	1	7	3	+4	8	
9	1207 Antalya	5	2	2	1	9	7	+2	8	
10	ABB Fomget	5	2	1	2	25	9	+16	7	
11	Sultanbeyli Gücü	5	2	0	3	12	14	−2	6	
12	Haymana	5	1	2	2	13	13	0	5	
13	Ünye Kadın	4	0	2	2	5	8	−3	2	
14	Şile BilgiDoğa	5	1	0	4	4	31	−27	0 (Note: Şile BilgiDoğa were deducted 3 points by the decision of the Federation.)	Relegation to the First League
15	Giresun Sanayi	4	0	0	4	1	37	−36	0	Relegation to the First League
16	Bakırköy	5	0	0	5	1	14	−13	−3 (Note: Bakırköy Kadın were deducted 3 points by the decision of the Federation.)	Relegation to the First League

Updated to match(es) played on 27 September 2026. Source: TFF
Rules for classification: 1) Points; 2) Head-to-head points; 3) Head-to-head goal difference; 4) Head-to-head goals scored; 5) Goal difference; 6) Goals scored; 7) Play-off.

=== Women's First League ===
==== Group A ====
Pos	Team	Pld	W	D	L	GF	GA	GD	Pts	Qualification or relegation
1	Soma Zafer Spor ve Gençlik	2	1	1	0	6	3	+3	4	Promotion to Super League
2	Sancaktepe Belediye	2	1	1	0	5	2	+3	4	Qualification for Promotion play-off
3	Dudullu	2	1	1	0	3	2	+1	4	
4	Avcılar Cihangirspor	2	1	0	1	3	1	+2	3	
5	Kocaeli	2	1	0	1	3	5	−2	3	
6	Sakarya	2	0	2	0	1	1	0	2	
7	Kdz. Ereğli Lisesi	2	0	1	1	1	4	−3	1	Relegation to the Second League
8	Telsiz Spor	2	0	0	2	1	5	−4	0	Relegation to the Second League

Updated to match(es) played on 27 September 2026. Source: TFF

==== Group B ====
Pos	Team	Pld	W	D	L	GF	GA	GD	Pts	Qualification or relegation
1	Gaziantep Safir	2	2	0	0	14	0	+14	6	Promotion to Super League
2	Şırnak Kadın	2	2	0	0	7	1	+6	6	Qualification for Promotion play-off
3	Afyonkarahisar Anadolu Gücü	2	1	1	0	6	2	+4	4	
4	Siverek Kadın	2	1	1	0	6	2	+4	4	
5	Genç Ülküm	2	1	0	1	4	4	0	3	
6	Gazikentspor	2	0	0	2	1	7	−6	0	
7	Adana İdman Yurdu	2	0	0	2	0	8	−8	0	Relegation to the Second League
8	Horozkent	2	0	0	2	0	14	−14	0	Relegation to the Second League

Updated to match(es) played on 27 September 2026. Source: TFF
