= 2026–27 TFF 1. Lig =

TFF 1. Lig
- Season: 2026–27
- Dates: 7 August 2026 – 8 May 2027
- All statistics correct as of 14 September 2026.

The 2026-27 TFF 1. Lig is the 26th season since the league was established in 2001 and 64th season of the second-level football league of Turkey since its establishment in 1963–64. It will begin on 7 August 2026. The season is set to end on 8 May 2027.

== Teams ==
=== Team changes ===
Promoted to 2026–27 Süper Lig	Relegated from 2025–26 Süper Lig
Erzurumspor; Amedspor; Çorum F.K.	Antalyaspor; Kayserispor; Fatih Karagümrük S.K.
Promoted from 2025–26 TFF 2. Lig	Relegated to 2026–27 TFF 2. Lig
Bursaspor; Batman Petrolspor; Mardin 1969; Muğlaspor	Adana Demirspor; Hatayspor; Sakaryaspor; Serik Belediyespor

=== Stadiums and locations ===
Location of teams in 2026–27 TFF 1. Lig
Clubs located in Istanbul

Team	Home city/borough	Home province	Stadium	Capacity
Antalyaspor	Antalya	Antalya	Antalya Stadium	29,307
Bandırmaspor	Bandırma	Balıkesir	17 Eylül Stadium	12,725
Batman Petrolspor	Batman	Batman	Batman Stadium	15,000
Bodrum	Bodrum	Muğla	Bodrum District Stadium	3,925
Boluspor	Bolu	Bolu	Bolu Atatürk Stadium	8,456
Bursaspor	Bursa	Bursa	Bursa Metropolitan Stadium	43,361
Esenler Erokspor	Esenler	Istanbul	Esenler Stadium	5,296
Fatih Karagümrük	Fatih	Istanbul	Atatürk Olympic Stadium	77,563
Iğdır	Iğdır	Iğdır	Iğdır City Stadium	2,700
İstanbulspor	Büyükçekmece	Istanbul	Esenyurt Necmi Kadıoğlu Stadium	7,500
Kayserispor	Kayseri	Kayseri	Kadir Has Stadium	32,856
Keçiörengücü	Keçiören	Ankara	Ankara Aktepe Stadium	4,883
Manisa	Manisa	Manisa	Manisa 19 Mayıs Stadium	16,066
Mardin 1969	Mardin	Mardin	21 Kasım Stadium	5,700
Muğlaspor	Muğla	Muğla	Muğla Atatürk Stadium	7,755
Pendikspor	Pendik	Istanbul	Pendik Stadium	2,500
Sarıyer	Sarıyer	Istanbul	Yusuf Ziya Öniş Stadium	4,100
Sivasspor	Sivas	Sivas	New Sivas 4 Eylül Stadium	27,734
Ümraniyespor	Ümraniye	Istanbul	Ümraniye Municipality City Stadium	3,513
Vanspor	Van	Van	Van Atatürk Stadium	5,885

== League table ==
Pos	Team	Pld	W	D	L	GF	GA	GD	Pts	Qualification or relegation
1	Kayserispor	15	10	3	2	36	12	+24	33	Promotion to the Süper Lig
2	Bursaspor	14	10	2	2	30	12	+18	32	Promotion to the Süper Lig
3	Iğdır	15	8	5	2	21	13	+8	29	Qualification for the Süper Lig Playoff Final
4	Keçiörengücü	15	7	5	3	27	18	+9	26	Qualification for the Süper Lig Playoff Quarter Finals
5	Mardin 1969	15	7	4	4	20	15	+5	25	Qualification for the Süper Lig Playoff Quarter Finals
6	Batman Petrolspor	14	7	3	4	27	24	+3	24	Qualification for the Süper Lig Playoff Quarter Finals
7	Bodrumspor	14	5	6	3	18	13	+5	21	Qualification for the Süper Lig Playoff Quarter Finals
8	Karagümrük	15	5	5	5	20	16	+4	20	
9	Antalyaspor	14	6	2	6	20	21	−1	20	
10	Ümraniyespor	14	4	6	4	18	14	+4	18	
11	Esenler Erokspor	14	4	6	4	20	18	+2	18	
12	Muğlaspor	14	4	6	4	18	25	−7	18	
13	Bandırmaspor	15	4	5	6	19	18	+1	17	
14	Sarıyer	15	4	5	6	16	22	−6	17	
15	Vanspor	14	5	3	6	17	23	−6	18	
16	Pendikspor	14	3	5	6	15	25	−10	14	
17	Manisa	14	3	4	7	21	24	−3	13	Relegation to the TFF 2. Lig
18	Sivasspor	14	2	7	5	17	23	−6	13	Relegation to the TFF 2. Lig
19	İstanbulspor	15	2	2	11	12	34	−22	8	Relegation to the TFF 2. Lig
20	Boluspor	14	1	2	11	6	28	−22	5	Relegation to the TFF 2. Lig

Updated to match(es) played on 21 November 2026. Source: TFF,
Rules for classification: 1) Points; 2) Head-to-head points; 3) Head-to-head goal difference; 4) Head-to-head goals scored; 5) Goal difference; 6) Goals scored; 7) Play-off.

=== Results ===
Home \ Away	ANT	BAN	BAP	BOD	BOL	BUR	ESE	IĞD	İST	KAR	KAY	KEÇ	MAN	MAR	MUĞ	PEN	SAR	SİV	ÜMR	VAN
Antalyaspor				1–2							0–4	4–3				2–3	1–2	1–2		3–0
Bandırmaspor	0–1				6–0			1–2	3–0			1–1						1–1	0–1	
Batman Petrolspor					2–0	1–1	3–2		4–2	4–3								2–1		
Bodrumspor		2–1	4–0			0–2	0–0					0–2			0–0				1–1	
Boluspor	0–1											0–2	1–2	0–3		1–1				0–3
Bursaspor		3–0					2–2	1–0	4–0					1–2		2–0				
Esenler Erokspor								0–1		0–2	0–3	3–2		4–2			1–1			
Iğdır	1–1		2–1		1–0					2–0	0–1		4–2	1–0						
İstanbulspor	0–2			2–2			0–1	1–2		1–1				1–2						
Karagümrük						2–1					1–1	1–2	1–1		1–1	0–1			2–1	
Kayserispor			2–2			1–2			4–0				3–2		6–0			2–0		
Keçiörengücü						2–4		0–0								4–1	3–0	1–1	2–2	
Manisa			2–1	0–0		1–2	1–1		0–1						3–4					4–1
Mardin 1969	2–0			1–0						1–0	0–1		2–1							1–1
Muğlaspor		0–0			2–0	0–3		2–2	5–0											2–2
Pendikspor		1–1	2–2	1–1							2–2								1–0	1–2
Sarıyer		1–1	1–2	1–4	2–1					0–2					2–0	2–0				
Sivasspor					1–2		0–0						2–2	2–2	1–1	4–1	1–1			
Ümraniyespor	1–2						1–1							0–0	0–1		1–1	4–0		
Vanspor		0–2	0–2						3–2	0–2		1–1					1–0		0–2	

Updated to match(es) played on 2 November 2026. Source: TFF
Legend: Blue = home team win; Yellow = draw; Red = away team win.
