= 2026–27 TFF 2. Lig =

26th season of TFF Second League

TFF 2. Lig
- Season: 2026–27
- Dates: 5 September 2026 – May 2027

The 2026–27 TFF Second League is the 26th season of the third-level football league of Turkey since the league was established in 2001. It will begin on 5 September 2026. The season is set to end in May 2027.

== Teams ==
=== Team changes ===
Promoted to 2026–27 TFF 1. Lig	Relegated from 2025–26 TFF 1. Lig
Batman Petrolspor; Bursaspor; Mardin 1969; Muğlaspor	Serikspor; Sakaryaspor; Hatayspor; Adana Demirspor
Promoted from 2025–26 TFF 3. Lig	Relegated to 2026–27 TFF 3. Lig
12 Bingölspor; İnegöl Kafkasspor; Kütahyaspor; Sebat Gençlikspor	Adanaspor; Beykoz Anadoluspor; Bucaspor 1928; Karaman; Kepezspor; Yeni Malatyaspor; Yeni Mersin İdmanyurdu

== White Group ==
=== Team information ===
Locations of 2026–27 2. Lig White Group teams on the map of Turkey

=== League table ===
Pos	Team	Pld	W	D	L	GF	GA	GD	Pts	Qualification or relegation
1	Muşspor	9	7	1	1	29	13	+16	22	Promotion to TFF 1. Lig
2	Aliağa	8	7	0	1	17	11	+6	21	Qualification for promotion play-offs
3	Elazığspor	8	6	1	1	22	7	+15	19	Qualification for promotion play-offs
4	Güzide Gebzespor	8	5	3	0	14	6	+8	18	Qualification for promotion play-offs
5	İnegöl Kafkasspor	8	5	1	2	14	9	+5	16	Qualification for promotion play-offs
6	Şanlıurfaspor	8	4	3	1	16	11	+5	15	
7	Çorluspor 1947	8	4	2	2	15	9	+6	14	
8	Isparta 32	8	3	2	3	16	16	0	11	
9	Erbaaspor	8	3	1	4	17	15	+2	10	
10	Menemen	8	3	1	4	8	10	−2	10	
11	68 Aksaray Belediyespor	8	2	3	3	13	11	+2	9	
12	Ankaraspor	8	3	0	5	11	13	−2	9	
13	Somaspor	7	2	1	4	10	16	−6	7	
14	Sebatspor	7	1	2	4	11	15	−4	5	
15	Kastamonuspor (Note: Kastamonuspor have been deducted 3 points.)	8	2	1	5	7	21	−14	4	
16	Arnavutköy Belediyespor (Note: Arnavutköy Belediyespor have been deducted 3 points.)	8	0	0	8	4	19	−15	−3	Relegation to TFF 3. Lig
17	Hatayspor (Note: Hatayspor have been deducted 9 points.)	8	1	1	6	4	14	−10	−5	Relegation to TFF 3. Lig
18	Adana Demirspor (Note: Adana Demirspor have been deducted 51 points.)	9	2	1	6	7	19	−12	−44	Relegation to TFF 3. Lig

Updated to match(es) played on 31 October 2026. Source: Haberler.com (AA) Weltfussball
Rules for classification: 1) Points; 2) Head-to-head points; 3) Head-to-head goal difference; 4) Head-to-head goals scored; 5) Goal difference; 6) Goals scored

=== Results ===
Home \ Away	68A	ADS	ALİ	ANK	ARV	ÇOR	ELA	KAS	GEB	HAT	ISP	İKG	ŞAN	MEN	ERB	MUŞ	SEB	SOM
68 Aksaray								3–0										
Adana Demirspor							0–2											
Aliağa											2–0							
Ankaraspor															2–1			
Arnavutköy Belediye			1–4															
Çorluspor 1947										0–0								
Elazığspor																	3–1	
Kastamonuspor						0–5												
Gebze SK					1–0													
Hatayspor									0–2									
Isparta 32		1–2																
İnegöl Kafkas																		1–3
Şanlıurfaspor				1–0														
Menemen												1–3						
Erbaaspor																4–4		
Muşspor														4–0				
Sebat Gençlik													3–3					
Somaspor	3–3																	

Updated to match(es) played on 13 September 2026. Source: TFF
Legend: Blue = home team win; Yellow = draw; Red = away team win.

=== Positions by round ===
Notes:The table will be adjusted retrospectively after the postponed match(es) have been played.

Team ╲ Round	1	2	3	4	5	6	7	8	9	10	11	12	13	14	15	16	17	18	19	20	21	22	23	24	25	26	27	28	29	30	31	32	33	34
68 Aksaray																																		
Adana Demirspor																																		
Aliağa																																		
Ankaraspor																																		
Arnavutköy Belediye																																		
Çorluspor 1947																																		
Elazığspor																																		
Kastamonuspor																																		
Gebze SK																																		
Hatayspor																																		
Isparta 32																																		
İnegöl Kafkas																																		
Şanlıurfaspor																																		
Menemen																																		
Erbaaspor																																		
Muşspor																																		
Sebat Gençlik																																		
Somaspor																																		

2027–28 1. Lig	Play-off	2027–28 3. Lig

First match(es) will be played on ?. Source: TFF

== Red Group ==
=== Team information ===
Locations of 2026–27 2. Lig Red Group teams on the map of Turkey

=== League table ===
Pos	Team	Pld	W	D	L	GF	GA	GD	Pts	Qualification or relegation
1	Sakaryaspor	8	6	1	1	18	10	+8	19	Promotion to TFF 1. Lig
2	52 Orduspor	8	6	0	2	19	9	+10	18	Qualification for promotion play-offs
3	Adana 01	8	5	2	1	17	11	+6	17	Qualification for promotion play-offs
4	Ankara Demirspor	8	5	1	2	25	11	+14	16	Qualification for promotion play-offs
5	Erzincanspor	7	4	3	0	15	9	+6	15	Qualification for promotion play-offs
6	1461 Trabzon	8	3	3	2	16	13	+3	12	
7	Kahramanmaraş İstiklalspor	8	3	2	3	11	11	0	11	
8	Karacabey Belediyespor	7	3	2	2	9	12	−3	11	
9	Beyoğlu Yeni Çarşı	7	3	1	3	15	12	+3	10	
10	12 Bingölspor	8	2	4	2	9	9	0	10	
11	Kütahyaspor	8	2	1	5	10	17	−7	7	
12	Ankaragücü (Note: MKE Ankaragücü have been deducted 3 points.)	7	2	3	2	13	9	+4	6	
13	Kırklarelispor	7	1	2	4	6	11	−5	5	
14	Fethiyespor	7	1	2	4	6	12	−6	5	Relegation to TFF 3. Lig
15	İnegölspor (Note: İnegölspor have been deducted 3 points.)	7	1	2	4	8	13	−5	2	Relegation to TFF 3. Lig
16	Serikspor (Note: Serikspor have been deducted 3 points.)	8	1	2	5	6	15	−9	2	Relegation to TFF 3. Lig
17	İskenderunspor (Note: İskenderunspor have been deducted 3 points.)	7	0	1	6	5	24	−19	−2	Relegation to TFF 3. Lig
18	Altınordu (Note: Altınordu were relegated by the Turkish Football Federation following the club's withdrawal from the league.) (R)	0	0	0	0	0	0	0	0	

Updated to match(es) played on 1 November 2026. Source: Ajans344 Süper Kanal TV Ege Alternatif Football Nation
Rules for classification: 1) Points; 2) Head-to-head points; 3) Head-to-head goal difference; 4) Head-to-head goals scored; 5) Goal difference; 6) Goals scored
(R) Relegated

=== Results ===
Home \ Away	68A	ADS	ALİ	ANK	ARN	ÇOR	ELA	ERB	GGE	HAT	I32	İKG	KST	MEN	MUŞ	SEB	SOM	ŞAN
68 Aksaray																		
Adana Demirspor																		
Aliağa																		
Ankaraspor																		
Arnavutköy Belediye																		
Çorluspor 1947																		
Elazığspor																		
Erbaaspor																		
Gebze SK																		
Hatayspor																		
Isparta 32																		
İnegöl Kafkas																		
Kastamonuspor																		
Menemen																		
Muşspor																		
Sebat Gençlik																		
Somaspor																		
Şanlıurfaspor																		

First match(es) will be played: 5 September 2026. Source: TFF
Legend: Blue = home team win; Yellow = draw; Red = away team win.

=== Positions by round ===
Notes:The table will be adjusted retrospectively after the postponed match(es) have been played.

Team ╲ Round	1	2	3	4	5	6	7	8	9	10	11	12	13	14	15	16	17	18	19	20	21	22	23	24	25	26	27	28	29	30	31	32	33	34
68 Aksaray																																		
Adana Demirspor																																		
Aliağa																																		
Ankaraspor																																		
Arnavutköy Belediye																																		
Çorluspor 1947																																		
Elazığspor																																		
Erbaaspor																																		
Gebze SK																																		
Hatayspor																																		
Isparta 32																																		
İnegöl Kafkas																																		
Kastamonuspor																																		
Menemen																																		
Muşspor																																		
Sebat Gençlik																																		
Somaspor																																		
Şanlıurfaspor																																		

2027–28 1. Lig	Play-off	2027–28 3. Lig

First match(es) will be played on 5 September 2026. Source: TFF

== Promotion Playoffs ==
=== Bracket ===
Semifinals
W5	TBD (White Group 5th)
W2	TBD (White Group 2nd)
White Group
W4	TBD (White Group 4th)
W3	TBD (White Group 3rd)
R5	TBD (Red Group 5th)
R2	TBD (Red Group 2nd)
Red Group
R4	TBD (Red Group 4th)
R3	TBD (Red Group 3rd)

Finals
Winner Semifinal 1
Winner Semifinal 2
Winner Semifinal 3
Winner Semifinal 4
