= Abdullah Aydın =

French footballer

Personal information
- Date of birth: 18 December 2000 (age 25)
- Place of birth: Quimper, France
- Height: 1.70 m (5 ft 7 in)
- Position: Central midfielder

Team information
- Current team: Mardin 1969
- Number: 8

Senior career*
Years	Team	Apps	(Gls)
2020	Concarneau	0	(0)
2020	Beşiktaş	0	(0)
2020–2021	→ Altay (loan)	0	(0)
2021–2022	→ Menemenspor (loan)	30	(1)
2022–2023	→ Ankara Keçiörengücü (loan)	22	(0)
2023–2024	→ Şanlıurfaspor (loan)	21	(1)
2024	→ Esenler Erokspor (loan)	8	(0)
2024–2025	→ Erbaaspor (loan)	15	(1)
2025	Karaköprü Belediyespor	12	(2)
2025–	Mardin 1969	27	(0)
- * Club domestic league appearances and goals as of 12 April 2026

Abdullah Aydın (born 18 December 2000) is a French professional footballer who plays as a central midfielder for Mardin 1969. He is right-footed.

== Career ==
Aydin started his career with Concarneau. On 21 August 2020 Aydın joined Süper Lig club Beşiktaş.

In 2020, he was sent on loan to Altay but he did not make any single appearances in the full season. In 2021, he was sent on loan to Menemenspor. In 2022, he was sent on loan to Ankara Keçiörengücü S.K. In 2023, he was sent on loan to Şanlıurfaspor.
