= Kahveci =

Kahveci (also spelled Kahwaji, [kavedʒi], Arabic: قهوجي) is a Turkish and Arabic word meaning coffee producer. It is often used as a surname and may refer to:

== People ==
- Adnan Kahveci (1949–1993), Turkish politician
- İrfan Kahveci (born 1995), Turkish footballer
- Jean Kahwaji (born 1953), Lebanese commander of the Lebanese Armed Forces
- Nihat Kahveci (born 1979), Turkish footballer
- Ömer Kahveci (born 1992), Turkish footballer
