= Birkan Tetik =

Turkish footballer

Personal information
- Full name: Muhammed Birkan Tetik
- Date of birth: 19 October 1995 (age 31)
- Place of birth: Kırıkkale, Turkey
- Height: 1.90 m (6 ft 3 in)
- Position: Goalkeeper

Team information
- Current team: Batman Petrolspor
- Number: 13

Youth career
- 2005–2008: Alanyaspor
- 2008–2015: Galatasaray

Senior career*
Years	Team	Apps	(Gls)
2015–2018	Fatih Karagümrük	33	(0)
2017–2018	→ Bodrum (loan)	16	(0)
2018–2019	Kastamonuspor 1966	16	(0)
2019–2021	Ankara Keçiörengücü	5	(0)
2021–2023	Manisa	43	(0)
2023–2025	Eyüpspor	9	(0)
2025–2026	Esenler Erokspor	8	(0)
2026–	Batman Petrolspor	2	(0)

International career^{‡}
2012	Turkey U17	1	(0)
- * Club domestic league appearances and goals as of 18 October 2026 ‡ National team caps and goals as of 03:45, 23 December 2024 (UTC)

Muhammed Birkan Tetik (born 19 October 1995) is a Turkish professional footballer who plays as a goalkeeper for TFF 1. Lig club Batman Petrolspor.

== Club career ==
Tetik is a product of the youth academies of Alanyaspor and Galatasaray. In 2015, he moved to Fatih Karagümrük in the TFF Second League where he began his senior career. He joined Bodrum on loan on 25 July 2017 on a year-long loan. On 3 July 2019, he moved to the TFF First League club Ankara Keçiörengücü. On 7 June 2021, he transferred to Manisa on a 3-year contract. On 1 August 2023, he transferred to Eyüpspor, and in his debut season helped them earn promotion to the Süper Lig. He made his Süper Lig debut as a half-time substitute in a 2–0 loss to Kasımpaşa on 13 December 2024, after the starting goalkeeper Berke Özer was injured.

On 13 November 2025, Tetik was banned from playing for 45 days for his involvement in the 2025 Turkish football betting scandal.

== International career ==
On 2 February 2012, Tetik was first called up to the Turkey U17s for a set of friendlies. He was called up to the Turkey national under-23 football team for the 2017 Islamic Solidarity Games.

== Honours ==
Eyüpspor

- TFF 1. Lig: 2023–24
