= Mücahit Albayrak =

Turkish footballer

Personal information
- Date of birth: 30 July 1991 (age 35)
- Place of birth: Rize, Turkey
- Height: 1.80 m (5 ft 11 in)
- Position: Leftback

Team information
- Current team: Batman Petrolspor
- Number: 53

Youth career
- 2002–2008: Çaykurspor
- 2008–2011: Medipol Başakşehir

Senior career*
Years	Team	Apps	(Gls)
2011–2018	Ümraniyespor	147	(8)
2018–2021	Gaziantep	7	(0)
2019–2021	→ BB Erzurumspor (loan)	40	(0)
2021	→ Samsunspor (loan)	9	(0)
2021–2022	BB Erzurumspor	34	(3)
2022–2023	Samsunspor	13	(1)
2023–2024	Bandırmaspor	26	(3)
2024–2025	Esenler Erokspor	28	(0)
2025–2026	Bandırmaspor	35	(0)
2026–	Batman Petrolspor	4	(0)
- * Club domestic league appearances and goals as of 18 October 2026

Mücahit Albayrak (born 30 July 1991) is a Turkish professional footballer who plays as a leftback for TFF 1. Lig club Batman Petrolspor .

== Professional career ==
Albayrak spent most of his early career with Ümraniyespor in the amateur divisions of Turkish football. He then joined Gaziantep in 2018, and followed that with successive loans with BB Erzurumspor. Albayrak made his professional debut with BB Erzurumspor on a 2-1 Süper Lig loss to Sivasspor on 20 September 2020.
