= Malaly Dembélé =

French footballer (born 1997)

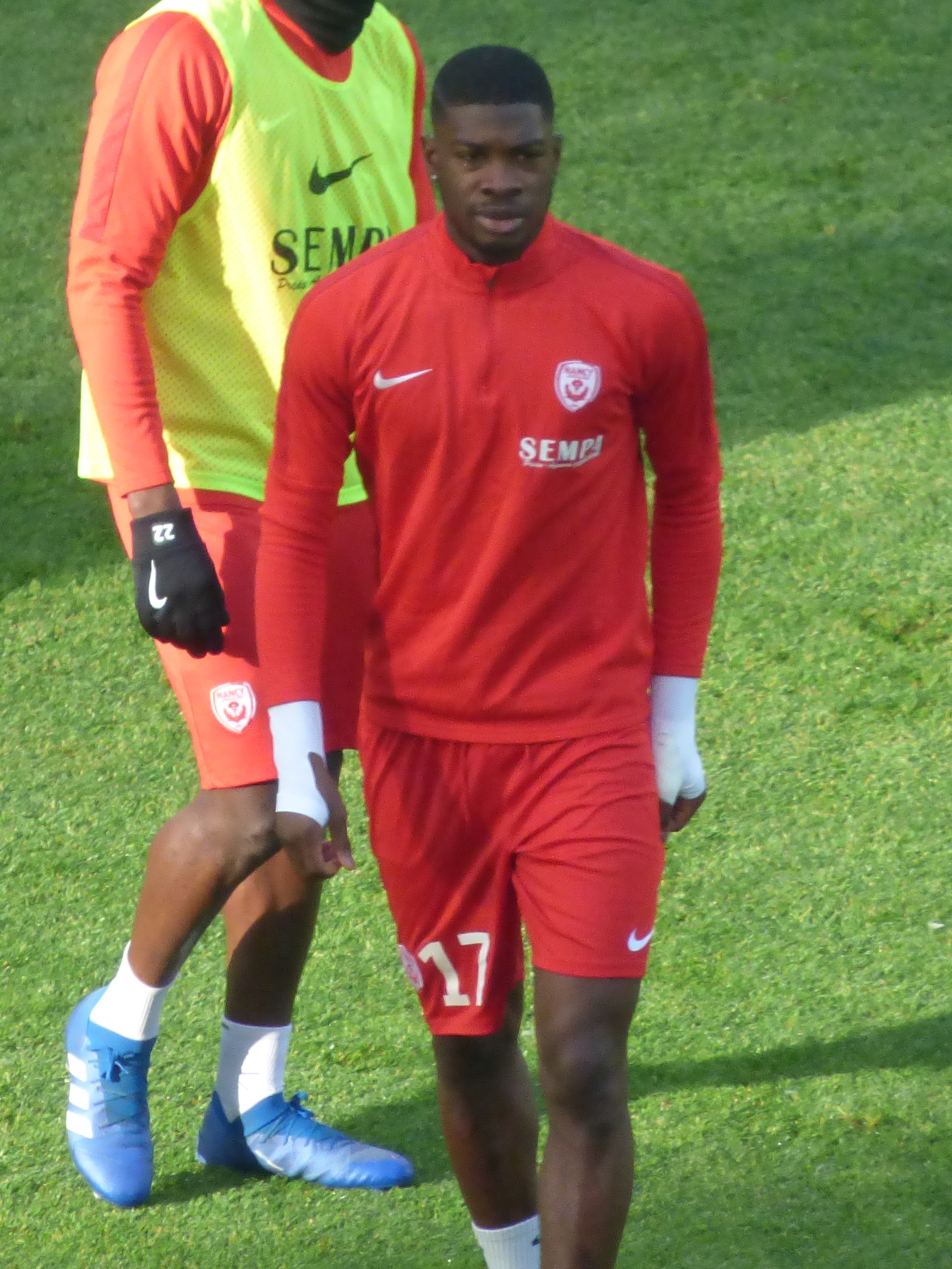
- Dembélé in 2019

Personal information
- Full name: Papis Malaly Dembélé
- Date of birth: 17 June 1997 (age 29)
- Place of birth: Ivry-sur-Seine, France
- Height: 1.84 m (6 ft 0 in)
- Position: Forward

Team information
- Current team: Śląsk Wrocław
- Number: 10

Youth career
- 2014–2017: Nancy B

Senior career*
Years	Team	Apps	(Gls)
2014–2020	Nancy B	58	(25)
2017–2020	Nancy	57	(7)
2020–2022	Rodez	64	(4)
2022	Bandırmaspor	15	(2)
2023–2025	Ankara Keçiörengücü	75	(19)
2025–2026	Sarıyer	34	(7)
2026–	Śląsk Wrocław	12	(3)
- * Club domestic league appearances and goals as of 25 October 2026

Papis Malaly Dembélé (born 17 June 1997) is a French professional footballer who plays as a forward for Ekstraklasa club Śląsk Wrocław.

== Personal life ==
Malaty Dembélé was born in Ivry-sur-Seine, France and has French nationality. He is of Malian descent.

== Career ==
In May 2017, Dembélé signed his first professional contract with a three-year deal. On 28 July 2017, he made his debut in a 3–1 Ligue 2 defeat to US Orléans.

On 3 August 2022, Dembélé signed a two-year contract with Bandırmaspor in Turkey.

On 17 July 2026, Dembélé joined Polish Ekstraklasa club Śląsk Wrocław on a permanent transfer after leaving Sarıyer. He stated that he chose the move because he wanted to play at a higher competitive level and viewed the Polish top flight as the right step in his career.

== Career statistics ==
As of match played 2 May 2026

Appearances and goals by club, season and competition
Season	Club	League			National cup (Note: Includes Coupe de France, Turkish Cup)		League cup (Note: Includes Coupe de la Ligue)		Other		Total	
Season	Club	Division	Apps	Goals	Apps	Goals	Apps	Goals	Apps	Goals	Apps	Goals
Nancy	2017–18	Ligue 2	24	3	1	0	2	1	—		27	4
Nancy	2018–19	Ligue 2	22	4	2	0	1	0	—		25	4
Nancy	2019–20	Ligue 2	11	0	1	1	2	1	—		14	2
Nancy	Total		57	7	4	1	5	2	—		66	10
Rodez	2020–21	Ligue 2	32	2	1	1	—		—		33	3
Rodez	2021–22	Ligue 2	32	2	0	0	—		—		32	2
Rodez	Total		64	4	1	1	—		—		65	5
Bandırmaspor	2022–23	TFF 1. Lig	15	2	0	0	—		—		15	2
Ankara Keçiörengücü	2022–23	TFF 1. Lig	11	5	—		—		—		11	5
Ankara Keçiörengücü	2023–24	TFF 1. Lig	30	6	3	4	—		—		33	10
Ankara Keçiörengücü	2024–25	TFF 1. Lig	34	8	0	0	—		—		34	8
Ankara Keçiörengücü	Total		75	19	3	4	—		—		78	23
Sarıyer	2025–26	TFF 1. Lig	34	7	1	0	—		—		35	7
Śląsk Wrocław	2026–27	Ekstraklasa	0	0	0	0	—		—		0	0
Career total			245	39	9	6	5	2	0	0	259	47
