= Çağlar Şahin Akbaba =

Turkish footballer (born 1995)

Personal information
- Date of birth: 17 March 1995 (age 31)
- Place of birth: Konak, Turkey
- Height: 1.87 m (6 ft 2 in)
- Position: Goalkeeper

Team information
- Current team: Batman Petrolspor
- Number: 25

Youth career
- 2006–2013: Bucaspor

Senior career*
Years	Team	Apps	(Gls)
2013–2017	Bucaspor	20	(0)
2016–2017	→ Elazığspor (loan)	29	(0)
2017–2018	Kardemir Karabükspor	12	(0)
2018–2019	Adana Demirspor	29	(0)
2019–2020	Bursaspor	31	(0)
2020–2022	Gaziantep	1	(0)
2021–2022	→ Eyüpspor (loan)	18	(0)
2022–2025	Boluspor	103	(0)
2025–2026	Vanspor	32	(0)
2026–	Batman Petrolspor	9	(0)

International career^{‡}
2013	Turkey U19	1	(0)
- * Club domestic league appearances and goals as of 18 October 2026 ‡ National team caps and goals as of 22 May 2018

Çağlar Şahin Akbaba (born 17 March 1995) is a Turkish professional footballer who plays as a goalkeeper for TFF 1. Lig club Batman Petrolspor.

== Professional career ==
Akbaba made his professional debut for Kardemir Karabükspor in a 2-0 Süper Lig loss to Konyaspor on 11 December 2017.

== International career ==
Akbaba is a one-time youth international for the Turkey U19s in a 3-1 friendly loss to the Netherlands U19s on 13 October 2013.

== Career statistics ==
=== Club ===
As of match played 21 September 2024

Appearances and goals by club, season and competition
Club	Season	League			National cup		Other		Total	
Club	Season	Division	Apps	Goals	Apps	Goals	Apps	Goals	Apps	Goals
Bucaspor	2012-13	TFF First League	0	0	0	0	—		0	0
Bucaspor	2013-14	TFF First League	5	0	0	0	—		5	0
Bucaspor	2014-15	TFF First League	15	0	0	0	—		15	0
Bucaspor	Total		20	0	0	0	—		20	0
Elazığspor (loan)	2015-16	TFF First League	12	0	2	0	—		14	0
Elazığspor (loan)	2016-17	TFF First League	17	0	5	0	—		22	0
Elazığspor (loan)	Total		29	0	7	0	—		36	0
Kardemir Karabükspor	2017-18	Süper Lig	12	0	0	0	—		12	0
Adana Demirspor	2018-19	TFF First League	29	0	1	0	—		30	0
Bursaspor	2019-20	TFF First League	31	0	0	0	2 (Note: Appearance(s) in Süper Lig Playoffs)	0	33	0
Gaziantep	2020-21	Süper Lig	1	0	3	0	—		4	0
Eyüpspor (loan)	2021-22	TFF First League	18	0	0	0	2	0	20	0
Boluspor	2022-23	TFF First League	31	0	0	0	—		31	0
Boluspor	2023-24	TFF First League	34	0	0	0	1	0	35	0
Boluspor	2024-25	TFF First League	6	0	0	0	—		6	0
Boluspor	Total		71	0	0	0	1	0	72	0
Career total			211	0	11	0	5	0	227	0
