= Orhan Kapucu =

Turkish footballer and manager

Personal information
- Date of birth: 29 September 1959 (age 67)
- Place of birth: Batman, Turkey
- Position: Midfielder

Senior career*
Years	Team	Apps	(Gls)
1977–1980	Batman Petrolspor		
1980–1984	Diyarbakirspor		
1984–1987	Samsunspor		
1987–1988	Malatyaspor		
1988	Fenerbahçe S.K.		
1988–1990	Çaykur Rizespor		
1990–1991	Mersin Idman Yurdu		
1990–1991	→ Adanaspor (loan)		
1991–1992	Siirtspor		
1992	Antalyaspor		
1992–1993	Batman Belediyespor		

International career
1986	Turkey	1	(0)

Managerial career
- –: Ceyhanspor
- 2003: Alanyaspor
- 2007–2008: Hatayspor
- 2008: Samsunspor
- * Club domestic league appearances and goals

Orhan Kapucu (born 29 September 1959, in Batman) is a Turkish former footballer and most recently the manager of Batman Petrolspor.

== Club career ==
Kapucu played for Fenerbahçe S.K., Diyarbakırspor, Samsunspor and Malatyaspor in the Turkish Süper Lig.

== International career ==
Kapucu made one appearance for the senior Turkey national football team, a qualifying match for Euro 1988 against Northern Ireland on 12 November 1986.
