= Görkem Bitin =

Turkish footballer

Personal information
- Date of birth: 22 June 1998 (age 28)
- Place of birth: Balçova, Turkey
- Height: 1.90 m (6 ft 3 in)
- Position: Forward

Team information
- Current team: Kahramanmaraş İstiklalspor
- Number: 12

Youth career
- 2006–2009: Altay
- 2009–2018: Fenerbahçe

Senior career*
Years	Team	Apps	(Gls)
2018–2019	Nazilli Belediyespor	43	(8)
2019–2021	Kırklarelispor	18	(7)
2021–2022	Eyüpspor	13	(4)
2021–2022	→ Pendikspor (loan)	31	(14)
2022–2026	Pendikspor	68	(7)
2024–2025	→ Ankara Keçiörengücü (loan)	31	(5)
2026–	Kahramanmaraş İstiklalspor	11	(6)

International career^{‡}
2012	Turkey U15	2	(0)
2015	Turkey U17	4	(0)
2015	Turkey U18	3	(0)
- * Club domestic league appearances and goals as of 14 November 2026 ‡ National team caps and goals as of 20:03, 7 October 2023 (UTC)

Görkem Bitin (born 22 June 1998) is a Turkish professional footballer who plays as a forward for TFF 2. Lig club Kahramanmaraş İstiklalspor.

== Career ==
Bitin is a youth product of Altay and Fenerbahçe. On 24 January 2018, he signed his first professional contract with Nazilli Belediyespor in the TFF Second League. On 10 August 2019, he moved to Kırklarelispor for 2 years. On 12 January 2021, he transferred to Eyüpspor on a 2.5 year contract. He moved to Pendikspor in for the 2022–23 season, and after helping them achieve promotion was signed permanently to the club as they returned to the Süper Lig.

== International career ==
Bitin is a youth international for Turkey, having played for the Turkey U18s.
