= Luccas Claro =

Brazilian footballer (born 1991)

Personal information
- Full name: Luccas Claro dos Santos
- Date of birth: 2 October 1991 (age 35)
- Place of birth: Ribeirão Preto, Brazil
- Height: 1.82 m (6 ft 0 in)
- Position: Centre-back

Team information
- Current team: Esenler Erokspor
- Number: 4

Youth career
- 2007–2010: Coritiba

Senior career*
Years	Team	Apps	(Gls)
2011–2017	Coritiba	163	(12)
2017–2019	Gençlerbirliği	69	(2)
2019–2022	Fluminense	92	(6)
2022–2026	Eyüpspor	110	(4)
2026–	Esenler Erokspor	9	(0)

International career
2011	Brazil U20	5	(2)
- * Club domestic league appearances and goals as of 15 October 2026

Luccas Claro dos Santos (born 2 October 1991), known as Luccas Claro, is a Brazilian professional footballer who plays as a central defender for Turkish TFF 1. Lig club Esenler Erokspor.

== Career ==
=== Coritiba ===
Luccas Claro made his league debut for Coritiba against Cianorte on 27 February 2011. He scored his first goal for the club against Bahia on 14 October 2012, scoring in the 11th minute. Luccas Claro left the club after his contract expired in December 2016.

=== Gençlerbirliği ===
He moved to Süper Lig side Gençlerbirliği in January 2017. Luccas Claro made his league debut against Ankaraspor on 29 January 2017. He scored his first goal for the club against Akhisarspor on 6 March 2017, scoring in the 6th minute.

=== Fluminense ===
Luccas Claro was signed in September, however did not make his debut until December due to injuries from his fellow team members. He made his league debut against Avaí on 1 December 2019. Luccas Claro scored his first goal for the club against Santos on 25 October 2020, scoring in the 29th minute.

=== Eyüpspor ===
Luccas Claro scored on his debut against Yeni Malatyaspor on 26 August 2022, scoring in the 57th minute.

== Career statistics ==
As of 11 May 2024

Appearances and goals by club, season and competition
Club	Season	League			State League		Cup		Continental		Other		Total	
Club	Season	Division	Apps	Goals	Apps	Goals	Apps	Goals	Apps	Goals	Apps	Goals	Apps	Goals
Coritiba	2011	Série A	7	0	1	0	0	0	—		—		8	0
Coritiba	2012	Série A	17	1	1	0	1	0	—		—		19	1
Coritiba	2013	Série A	20	2	11	0	0	0	1 (Note: Appearance(s) in Copa Sudamericana)	0	—		32	2
Coritiba	2014	Série A	31	2	9	2	6	0	4	0	—		50	4
Coritiba	2015	Série A	16	0	16	0	3	0	—		—		35	0
Coritiba	2016	Série A	23	2	11	3	0	0	—		—		34	5
Coritiba	Total		114	7	49	5	10	0	5	0	—		178	12
Gençlerbirliği	2016–17	Süper Lig	17	1	—		3	0	—		—		20	1
Gençlerbirliği	2017–18	Süper Lig	21	0	—		3	0	—		—		24	0
Gençlerbirliği	2018–19	TFF First League	31	1	—		0	0	—		—		31	1
Gençlerbirliği	Total		69	2	—		6	0	—		—		75	2
Fluminense	2019	Série A	2	0	—		—		—		—		2	0
Fluminense	2020	Série A	31	2	6	3	3	1	2	0	—		42	6
Fluminense	2021	Série A	28	0	5	0	6	0	10 (Note: Appearance(s) in Copa Libertadores)	0	—		49	0
Fluminense	2022	Série A	10	0	10	1	1	0	4 (Note: One appearance in Copa Libertadores, three appearances in Copa Sudamericana)	0	—		25	0
Fluminense	Total		71	2	21	3	10	1	16	0	—		118	6
Eyüpspor	2022–23	TFF First League	28	1	—		0	0	—		—		28	1
Eyüpspor	2023–24	TFF First League	33	1	—		1	0	—		—		34	1
Eyüpspor	Total		61	2	—		1	0	—		—		62	2
Career total			315	13	70	8	27	1	21	0	0	0	433	22

== Honours ==
Coritiba

- Campeonato Paranaense: 2011, 2012, 2013

Fluminense

- Taça Guanabara: 2022
- Campeonato Carioca: 2022

Individual

- Campeonato Carioca squad: 2021
