= Ferhat Yazgan =

German footballer

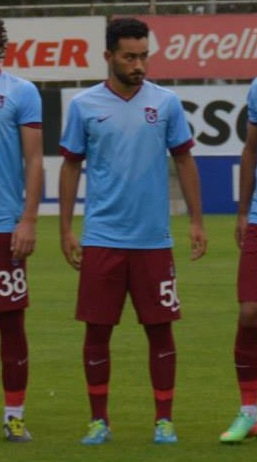
- Yazgan in 2014

Personal information
- Date of birth: 20 October 1992 (age 34)
- Place of birth: Kiel, Germany
- Height: 1.85 m (6 ft 1 in)
- Position: Attacking midfielder

Team information
- Current team: Esenler Erokspor
- Number: 27

Youth career
- –2003: Wiker SV
- 2003–2010: Holstein Kiel

Senior career*
Years	Team	Apps	(Gls)
2010–2011	Holstein Kiel	15	(0)
2011	Holstein Kiel II	10	(3)
2011–2014	VfL Wolfsburg II	79	(16)
2014–2016	Trabzonspor	4	(0)
2015–2016	→ 1461 Trabzon (loan)	25	(2)
2016–2019	Sakaryaspor	93	(13)
2019–2021	Manisa FK	45	(5)
2021–2022	İstanbulspor	28	(1)
2022–2023	Iğdır	0	(0)
2022–2023	→ Çorum (loan)	31	(2)
2023–2026	Çorum	100	(15)
2026–	Esenler Erokspor	6	(0)
- * Club domestic league appearances and goals as of 15 October 2026

Ferhat Yazgan (born 20 October 1992) is a German professional footballer who plays as an attacking midfielder for Turkish TFF 1. Lig club Esenler Erokspor.

== Club career ==
Yazgan began his career in his native Germany with Holstein Kiel in 2010, and shortly after had a stint with VfL Wolfsburg II. He transferred to the Turkish club Trabzonspor, where he had an unassuming stint including a loan to 1461 Trabzon in 2015. In 2016, he moved to Sakaryaspor for three years, followed by a stint in Manisa FK for two years in semi-pro Turkish leagues. He signed with İstanbulspor on 26 August 2021 in the TFF First League. He helped İstanbulspor achieve promotion in the 2021–22 season for the first time in 17 years. He started in İstanbulspor return to the Süper Lig in a 2–0 season opening loss to Trabzonspor on 5 August 2022.

== International career ==
Born in Germany, Yazgan is of Turkish descent. He was called up to the Turkey U20s in 2012 but did not make an appearance.
