= Taner Taşkın =

Turkish footballer(1972

Personal information
- Date of birth: 1 September 1965 (age 61)
- Place of birth: İzmir, Turkey
- Position: Defender

Team information
- Current team: Manisa (head coach)

Senior career*
Years	Team	Apps	(Gls)
1991–1992	Manisaspor		
1992–1999	Gençlerbirliği		
2001–2004	Manisaspor		
2003–2004	→ Çorumspor (loan)		
2004–2005	Mustafakemalpaşa Spor		

International career
- Turkey U21

Managerial career
- 2007: Turgutluspor
- 2008: Samsunspor (assistant)
- 2009–2011: Menemenspor
- 2011–2012: Manisa BB
- 2012–2014: Menemenspor
- 2014–2016: Manisaspor
- 2016: Sarıyer
- 2016–2017: Amed
- 2018: Manisaspor
- 2018–2019: Samsunspor
- 2019: Manisa
- 2019–2020: Vanspor
- 2020–2021: Tuzlaspor
- 2021: Tuzlaspor
- 2021: Ankaraspor
- 2021–2022: Keçiörengücü
- 2023: Sakaryaspor
- 2023: Bandırmaspor
- 2025: Manisa
- * Club domestic league appearances and goals

Taner Taşkın (born 27 October 1972) is a Turkish football manager and former player who played as a defender.
