= Erkam Reşmen =

Turkish footballer

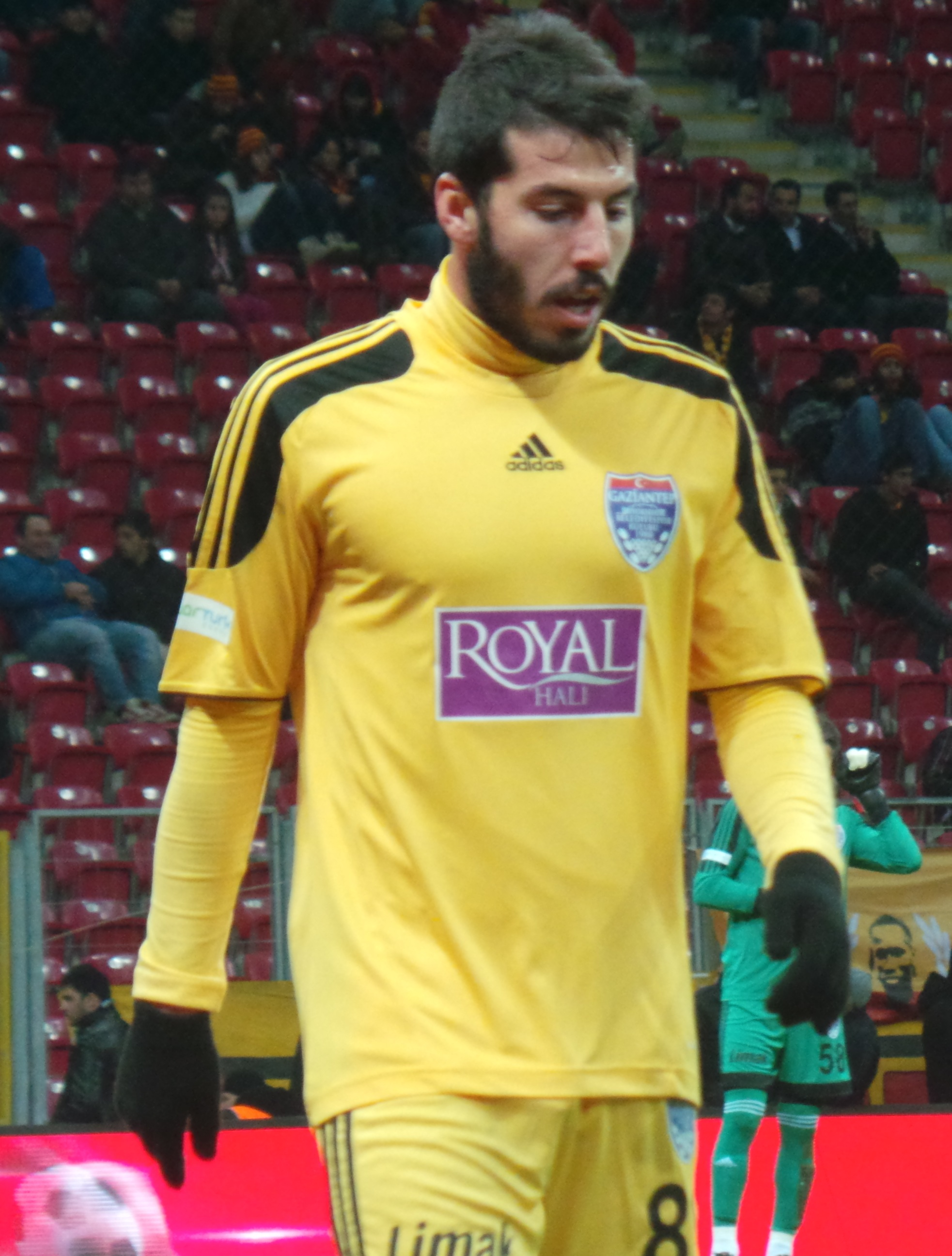

Personal information
- Date of birth: 29 November 1989 (age 36)
- Place of birth: Antalya, Turkey
- Height: 1.79 m (5 ft 10 in)
- Positions: Right-back; centre-back

Team information
- Current team: Muşspor
- Number: 89

Youth career
- 2000: Antalya Dsispor
- 2000–2005: Antalyaspor
- 2005–2008: Beşiktaş

Senior career*
Years	Team	Apps	(Gls)
2008–2013	Beşiktaş	0	(0)
2008–2010	→ Çorumspor (loan)	71	(0)
2010–2011	→ Gaziantep BB (loan)	15	(0)
2011	→ Boluspor (loan)	9	(0)
2012	→ Anadolu Selçukspor (loan)	5	(0)
2012–2013	→ Gaziantep BB (loan)	7	(0)
2013–2016	Gaziantep BB	79	(0)
2016–2017	Kayserispor	3	(0)
2017–2021	Samsunspor	110	(1)
2021–2022	Boluspor	6	(0)
2022–2024	Ankara Keçiörengücü	53	(3)
2024–2025	Kastamonuspor 1966	45	(2)
2025–	Muşspor	34	(3)

International career
2007	Turkey U19	1	(0)
- * Club domestic league appearances and goals as of 1 October 2026

Erkam Reşmen (born 29 November 1989) is a Turkish football player who plays as right-back for TFF 2. Lig club Muşspor. He plays mostly as a right-back, and occasionally as a centerback.

Reşmen represented the Turkey national under-19 football team in a 4-3 friendly loss to Sweden U19 in 2007.
