= Esenler Stadium =

Stadium in Istanbul, Turkey

- Esenler Stadyumu
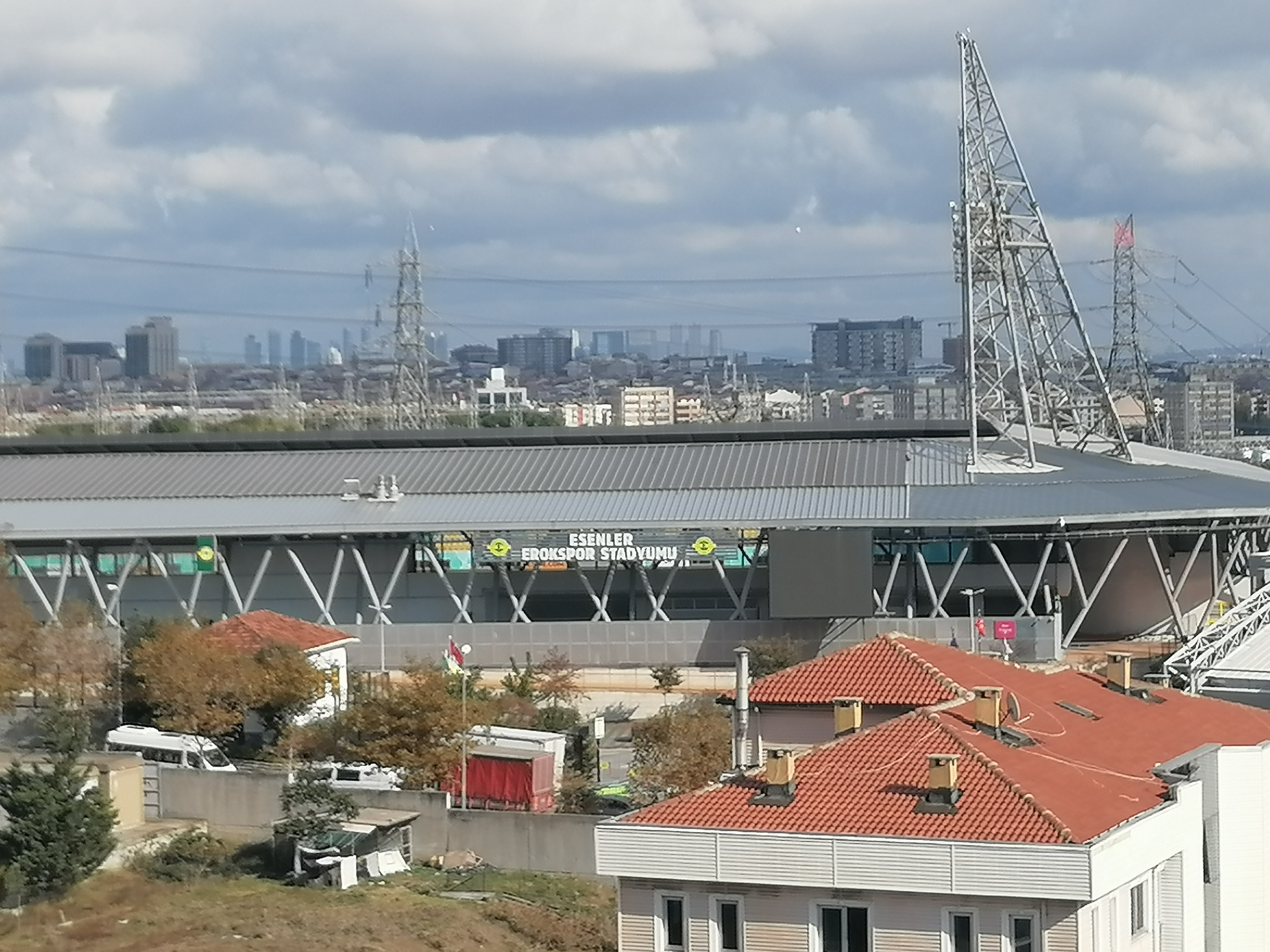
- Interactive map of Esenler Stadium
- Former names: Kemer Stadium (2000–2014)
- Location: Esenler, Istanbul, Turkey
- Coordinates: 41.054280°N 28.879725°E
- Owner: Istanbul Metropolitan Municipality
- Operator: Youth and Sports Directorate of Istanbul Province
- Capacity: 5,291
- Type: Stadium
- Events: Football, festivals, comcerts
- Surface: Grass
- Field size: 68 m × 105 m (223 ft × 344 ft)
- Acreage: 4,650 m^{2} (50,100 sq ft)

Construction
- Groundbreaking: 2014
- Built: 2014–2017
- Opened: 26 March 2017; 9 years ago
- Renovated: 2020

The Esenler Stadium (Turkish: Esenler Stadyumu), also known as Esenler Erokspor Stadium, is a stadium in Esenler district of Istanbul, Turkey. It was opened in 2017.

== History ==
The stadium was first opened as Kemer Stadium in the Kemer neighborhood of Esenler district of Istanbul in 2000. In 2014, the stadium was demolished to make place for a sports complex named "Esenler Sports Village", which was built on an area of 200,000 m^{2} (2,200,000 sq ft) by the Ministry of Youth and Sports and the Metropolitan Municipality of Istanbul in three years. The new stadium, covering an area of 4,650 m^{2} (50,100 sq ft) and located in that complex, was opened as Esenler Stadium on 26 March 2017. It is also known as Esenler Erokspor Stadium. In 2020, the stadium's field surface was renovated to make it suitable for professional league matches.

== Characteristics ==
Owned by the Metropolitan Municipality of Istanbul, and operated by the Youth and Sports Directorate of Istanbul Province, the stadium is situated at Kemer Mah., 949/1 Çıkmazı 4 in Esenler. It has four covered grandstands with a total seating capacity of 5,291. The field has the dimensions of 68 m × 105 m (223 ft × 344 ft) with natural grass surface. It features lighting. The venue is home to local amateur football clubs and young sportspeople. Additionally, it hosts festivities, festivals and music concerts in the district. From the 2017–18 season on, it is the home ground of the TFF First League club Esenler Erokspor. The stadium has an indoor parking lot of 20,000 m^{2} (220,000 sq ft).

== International competitions hosted ==
On 30 May 2025, Turkey women's national football team played a 2025 UEFA Women's Nations League B2 match against Republic of Ireland, which lost 1-2.
