= Anderson (footballer, born October 1998) =

Brazilian footballer

Personal information
- Full name: Anderson Cordeiro Costa
- Date of birth: 10 October 1998 (age 28)
- Place of birth: Bom Despacho, Brazil
- Height: 1.76 m (5 ft 9 in)
- Position: Winger

Youth career
- Famorine
- 2014–2016: Desportivo Brasil
- 2016–2018: Atlético Mineiro

Senior career*
Years	Team	Apps	(Gls)
2016	Desportivo Brasil	1	(1)
2017	Atlético Mineiro	0	(0)
2019	Taubaté	4	(0)
2019–2022	Tsarsko Selo	50	(8)
2021–2022	→ Fuenlabrada (loan)	25	(4)
2022–2023	Casa Pia	2	(0)
2023	Ankara Keçiörengücü	14	(3)
2023	ABC	14	(1)
2024	Chungnam Asan	5	(0)
2025	Votuporanguense		
2025–2026	Banga	7	(0)
2026	Manaus	2	(0)
- * Club domestic league appearances and goals as of 19 June 2026

Anderson Cordeiro Costa (born 10 October 1998), known as Anderson Cordeiro or simply Anderson, is a Brazilian professional footballer who plays as a winger.

== Career ==
=== Early career ===
Born in Bom Despacho, Minas Gerais, Anderson began his career at Famorine, a youth football school in his hometown. He then moved to Desportivo Brasil after a trial period in 2014, and played his first senior match for the club on 30 July 2016, in a 3–1 Campeonato Paulista Segunda Divisão home win over Tupã, where he scored his team's third goal.

In September 2016, Anderson moved to Atlético Mineiro, being initially assigned to the under-20 squad. He made his first team debut for Galo the following 1 March, coming on as a second-half substitute for Carlos Eduardo in a 2–2 away draw against Chapecoense, for the year's Primeira Liga; it was his maiden appearance with the main squad, and he subsequently returned to the under-20s.

On 2 March 2019, Anderson signed a contract with Taubaté until the end of the year.

=== Tsarsko Selo ===
In June 2019, after only four official appearances, Anderson moved abroad and signed for Bulgarian side FC Tsarsko Selo Sofia. He made his debut abroad on 13 July, starting in a 2–0 loss at PFC Ludogorets Razgrad.

Anderson scored his first professional goal on 29 February 2020, netting the opener in a 2–1 home success over PFC CSKA Sofia. On 25 April 2021, he scored a brace in a 4–0 home routing of FC Arda Kardzhali.

On 28 July 2021, Anderson joined Spanish Segunda División side CF Fuenlabrada on loan for one year.
