= Erhan Kartal =

Turkish footballer (born 1993)

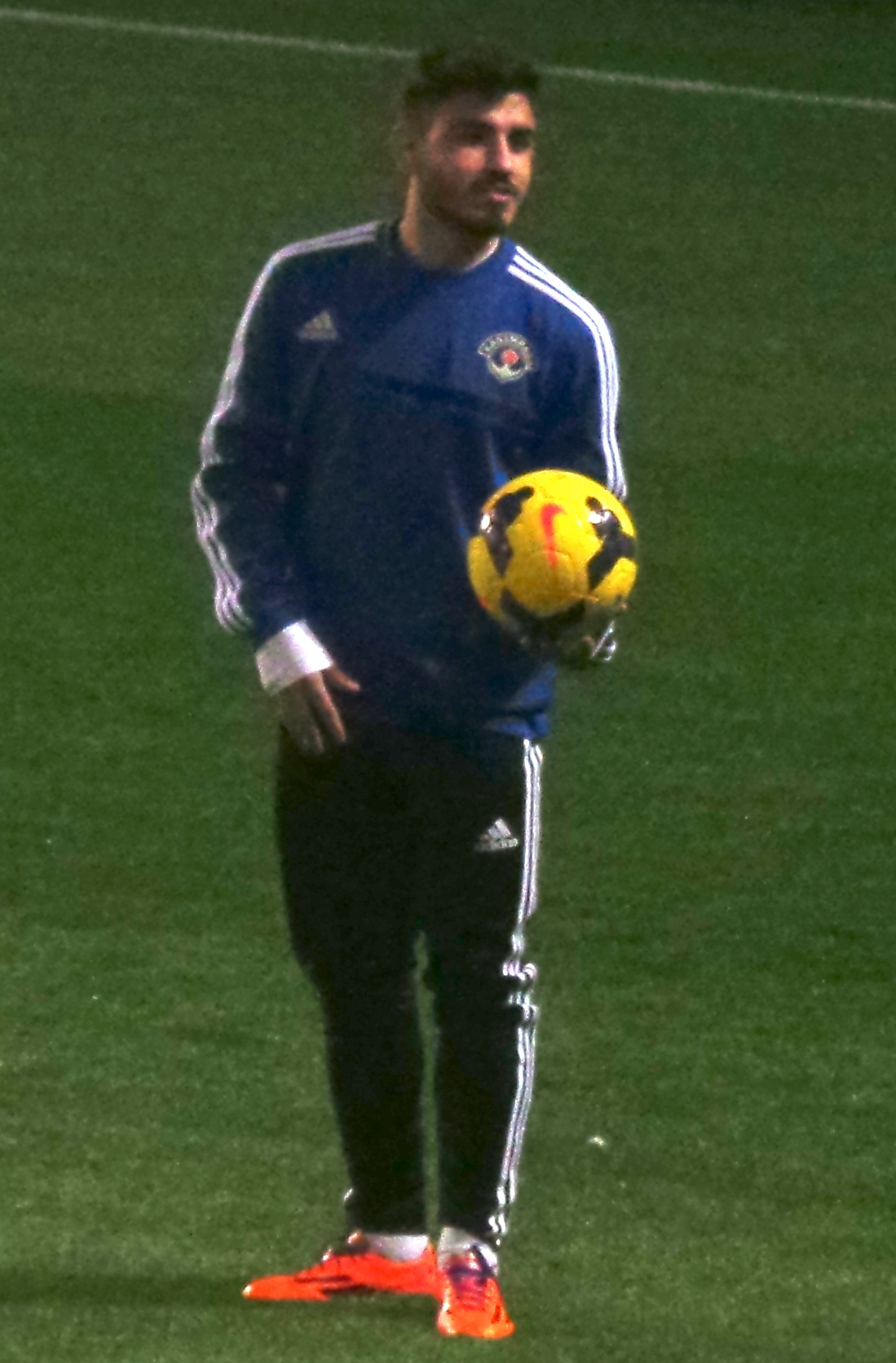

Personal information
- Date of birth: 1 March 1993 (age 33)
- Place of birth: Milas, Turkey
- Height: 1.71 m (5 ft 7 in)
- Position: Right-back

Team information
- Current team: Elazığspor
- Number: 20

Youth career
- 2003–2005: Yeni Milasspor
- 2005–2010: Denizlispor

Senior career*
Years	Team	Apps	(Gls)
2010–2013	Denizlispor	34	(0)
2013–2016	Kasımpaşa	21	(0)
2016	Şanlıurfaspor	17	(0)
2016–2017	Alanyaspor	4	(0)
2017	→ Gaziantep BB (loan)	8	(0)
2017–2018	Adana Demirspor	31	(0)
2018–2021	Samsunspor	48	(0)
2019–2020	→ Altay (loan)	32	(1)
2021–2022	Tuzlaspor	23	(0)
2022–2023	Ankara Keçiörengücü	20	(0)
2023–2024	Bucaspor 1928	22	(0)
2024–2025	Kastamonuspor 1966	41	(2)
2025–2026	Aliağa FK	28	(0)
2026–	Elazığspor	4	(0)

International career
2009	Turkey U16	9	(0)
2009–2010	Turkey U17	22	(1)
2010–2011	Turkey U18	6	(0)
2010–2012	Turkey U19	20	(1)
2012–2013	Turkey U20	7	(0)
- * Club domestic league appearances and goals as of 1 October 2026

Erhan Kartal (born 1 March 1993) is a Turkish footballer who plays as a right-back for TFF 2. Lig club Elazığspor.

== Club career ==
He made his Süper Lig debut for Denizlispor against Gençlerbirliği on 2 May 2010.

== International career ==
Kartal represented Turkey at the 2010 UEFA European Under-17 Football Championship.
