= Ogün Bayrak =

Turkish footballer (born 1998)

Personal information
- Date of birth: 10 October 1998 (age 28)
- Place of birth: Osmangazi, Türkiye
- Height: 1.78 m (5 ft 10 in)
- Position: Right-back

Team information
- Current team: Göztepe
- Number: 77

Youth career
- 2010–2014: Bosch Spor
- 2014–2016: Bağlarbaşıspor
- 2016–2017: Bursaspor

Senior career*
Years	Team	Apps	(Gls)
2017–2018	Yeşil Bursa SK	18	(0)
2018–2019	Kırşehir Futbol SK	29	(0)
2019–2020	Sancaktepe	25	(1)
2020–2023	Keçiörengücü	41	(0)
2022–2023	→ Tuzlaspor (loan)	29	(0)
2023–	Göztepe	71	(1)
- * Club domestic league appearances and goals as of 10 June 2026

Ogün Bayrak (born 10 October 1998) is a Turkish professional footballer who plays as a right-back for Göztepe.

== Club career ==
Bayrak is a product of the youth academies of Bosch Spor, Bağlarbaşıspor and Bursaspor. He began his senior career with Yeşil Bursa SK in the TFF Third League in 2017. The following season, he moved to Kırşehir Futbol SK. He spent the 2019–20 season in the TFF Second League with Sancaktepe. On 3 October 2020, he transferred to Keçiörengücü in the TFF First League. He spent the 2022–23 season on loan with Tuzlaspor. On 1 July 2023, he transferred to Göztepe on a 2+1 year contract. He helped Göztepe earn promotion to the Süper Lig for the 2024–25 season after finishing runners up in the league.
