= Rashad Muhammed =

French footballer (born 1993)

Personal information
- Full name: Rashad Muhammed
- Date of birth: 25 September 1993 (age 33)
- Place of birth: Saint-Germain-en-Laye, France
- Height: 1.84 m (6 ft 0 in)
- Position: Winger

Team information
- Current team: Khujand
- Number: 27

Senior career*
Years	Team	Apps	(Gls)
2013–2014	KFC Eppegem		
2014–2015	UR Namur		
2016–2017	Florø	39	(12)
2017–2019	Sarpsborg 08	13	(1)
2019–2020	BB Erzurumspor	35	(3)
2021–2022	Sarpsborg 08	15	(1)
2022–2023	Ankara Keçiörengücü	28	(10)
2023–2024	Sakaryaspor	8	(0)
2024	Adanaspor	7	(0)
2024	Al-Jandal	0	(0)
2024	Mağusa Türk Gücü	7	(0)
2025	Sparta Sarpsborg		
2026	TSV Siegen		
2026–	Khujand	0	(0)
- * Club domestic league appearances and goals as of 24 February 2026

Rashad Muhammed (born 25 September 1993) is a French professional footballer who plays as a winger for Khujand.

== Early life ==
Muhammed was born in France to a Nigerian father. He acquired French nationality on 22 December 2004, through the collective effect of his father's naturalization.

== Career ==
Muhammed is a youth product of Paris Saint-Germain F.C. and began his footballing career in semi-pro leagues in Belgium. After years of issues with agents, injuries, and unpaid wages, Muhammed took a year away from football before moving to Norway with Florø. He then moved to Sarpsborg 08 where he managed to play in the Europa League. On 14 January 2019, Muhammed signed a contract with Erzurum BB in the Turkish Süper Lig.

On 24 July 2024, Muhammed joined Saudi club Al-Jandal.

On 13 September 2024, Muhammed joined KTFF Süper Lig club Mağusa Türk Gücü on a contract until 30 May 2027, however Muhammed left the club after seven league and one super cup appearance, on 16 December 2024.

On 19 February 2026, Tajikistan Higher League club Khujand announced the signing of Muhammed.

== Career statistics ==
As of match played 18 April 2022

Club	Season	Division	League		Cup		Europe		Total	
Club	Season	Division	Apps	Goals	Apps	Goals	Apps	Goals	Apps	Goals
Florø	2016	2. divisjon	23	9	1	0	—		24	9
Florø	2017	1. divisjon	16	3	4	4	—		20	7
Florø	Total		39	12	5	4	—		44	16
Sarpsborg 08	2017	Eliteserien	0	0	0	0	—		0	0
Sarpsborg 08	2018	Eliteserien	13	1	3	1	14	2	30	4
Sarpsborg 08	Total		13	1	3	1	14	2	30	4
Erzurum BB	2018–19	Süper Lig	9	2	0	0	—		9	2
Erzurum BB	2019–20	1. Lig	13	0	5	0	—		18	0
Erzurum BB	2020–21	Süper Lig	13	1	2	1	—		15	2
Erzurum BB	Total		35	3	7	1	—		42	4
Sarpsborg 08	2021	Eliteserien	11	1	0	0	—		11	1
Sarpsborg 08	2022	Eliteserien	3	0	1	0	—		4	0
Sarpsborg 08	Total		14	1	1	0	—		15	1
Career Total			101	17	16	6	14	2	131	25
