= Mete Çelik =

Turkish footballer

Personal information
- Date of birth: 8 October 1996 (age 30)
- Place of birth: Langenau, Germany
- Height: 1.71 m (5 ft 7 in)
- Position: Left back

Team information
- Current team: Ankara Keçiörengücü
- Number: 67

Youth career
- TSV Langenau
- TSV Neu-Ulm
- 2013–2015: VfB Stuttgart

Senior career*
Years	Team	Apps	(Gls)
2015–2016	VfB Stuttgart II	6	(0)
2017–2020	SV Waldhof Mannheim	66	(1)
2020–2021	Ankaraspor	11	(0)
2021–2022	Menemenspor	14	(0)
2022–	Ankara Keçiörengücü	0	(0)

International career
2012	Turkey U16	8	(1)
2012–2013	Turkey U17	7	(0)
2013	Turkey U18	2	(0)
2014–2015	Turkey U19	7	(0)
- * Club domestic league appearances and goals as of 4 July 2020

Mete Çelik (born 8 October 1996) is a Turkish footballer who plays for Ankara Keçiörengücü.
