= Tugay Kacar =

Turkish footballer

Personal information
- Date of birth: 1 January 1994 (age 32)
- Place of birth: Uşak, Turkey
- Height: 1.88 m (6 ft 2 in)
- Position: Midfielder

Team information
- Current team: Esenler Erokspor
- Number: 4

Youth career
- 2006–2007: Turan İdmanyurdu
- 2007–2008: Uşakspor
- 2008–2011: Denizlispor

Senior career*
Years	Team	Apps	(Gls)
2011–2013	Denizlispor	3	(0)
2013	Ofspor	1	(0)
2013–2014	Kızılcabölükspor	11	(2)
2014–2020	Osmanlıspor	45	(1)
2015–2016	→ Karşıyaka (loan)	14	(0)
2016	→ Giresunspor (loan)	14	(1)
2018	→ Gazişehir Gaziantep (loan)	16	(2)
2020–2023	Boluspor	73	(4)
2023–2024	Manisa	15	(2)
2024	Eyüpspor	15	(0)
2024–	Esenler Erokspor	45	(1)

International career^{‡}
2010	Turkey U16	2	(0)
2010	Turkey U17	2	(0)
2014	Turkey U20	2	(0)
2015–2016	Turkey U21	6	(0)
- * Club domestic league appearances and goals as of 5 May 2026 ‡ National team caps and goals as of 7 January 2017

Tugay Kacar (born 1 January 1994) is a Turkish footballer who plays as a midfielder for Esenler Erokspor. Tugay is a former youth international for Turkey.
