= Ömer Kahveci =

Turkish footballer

Personal information
- Date of birth: 15 February 1992 (age 34)
- Place of birth: Kahramanmaraş, Turkey
- Height: 1.86 m (6 ft 1 in)
- Position: Goalkeeper

Team information
- Current team: Mardin 1969
- Number: 29

Youth career
- 2004–2005: Cesurspor
- 2005–2007: Adana Demirspor

Senior career*
Years	Team	Apps	(Gls)
2007–2010	Adana Demirspor	17	(0)
2010–2016	Bucaspor	119	(0)
2016–2017	Tirespor 1922	32	(0)
2017–2019	Şanlıurfaspor	65	(0)
2019–2023	Manisa	77	(0)
2021–2022	→ Ankaraspor (loan)	8	(0)
2023–2025	1461 Trabzon FK	35	(0)
2025	24 Erzincanspor	15	(0)
2026–	Mardin 1969	14	(0)

International career^{‡}
2009	Turkey U17	3	(0)
2009–2010	Turkey U18	5	(0)
2010–2011	Turkey U19	13	(0)
2011–2014	Turkey U21	9	(0)
- * Club domestic league appearances and goals as of 8 November 2026 ‡ National team caps and goals as of 9 September 2014

Ömer Kahveci (born 15 February 1992) is a Turkish professional footballer who plays as a goalkeeper for TFF 1. Lig club Mardin 1969. He is also a former youth international, having been capped for Turkey from U-17 to U-21 levels.

== Career ==
=== Club career ===
Kahveci began his career with Cesurspor in 2004. Adana Demirspor transferred him in 2005, and was he promoted to the senior team in 2007. He was transferred to Bucaspor in 2010.

=== International career ===
Kahveci represented Turkey at the 2009 FIFA U-17 World Cup and 2011 UEFA European Under-19 Championship.
