= Muhammed Bayır =

Turkish footballer

Personal information
- Date of birth: 5 February 1989 (age 37)
- Place of birth: Mamak, Ankara, Turkey
- Height: 1.70 m (5 ft 7 in)
- Position: Left-back

Youth career
- 2000–2007: Bugsaşspor

Senior career*
Years	Team	Apps	(Gls)
2007–2013	Bugsaşspor	109	(6)
2011–2012	→ Çorumspor (loan)	30	(0)
2012–2013	→ Bozüyükspor (loan)	33	(0)
2013–2019	Osmanlıspor	130	(1)
2019–2020	Giresunspor	30	(0)
2020–2021	Boluspor	11	(1)
2021–2023	Gençlerbirliği	30	(0)
2023	Tuzlaspor	11	(0)
2023–2024	Etimesgut Belediyespor	29	(1)
2024–2025	Ankaraspor	13	(0)
2025	Türk Metal 1963 SK	9	(0)
- * Club domestic league appearances and goals as of 26 April 2025

Muhammed Bayır (born 5 February 1989) is a Turkish footballer who plays as a left back. He made his debut in professional football for Bugsaşspor, and was part of their youth academy. Muhammed transferred to Osmanlıspor in 2013.

== Personal life ==
Muhammed became a father in on 24 June 2015, naming his son Adem.
