= Çorluspor =

Turkish sports club

Çorluspor 1947
- Full name: Çorluspor 1947
- Founded: 1 January 1991; 35 years ago (as Çorlu Sanayispor)
- Ground: General Basri Saran Stadium, Çorlu
- Capacity: 5,300
- Chairman: Yusuf Gümüş
- Manager: Ahmet Yavuz
- League: TFF Third League
- 2023–24: Turkish Regional Amateur League Group II, 1st of 15 (promoted)
Home colours	Away colours	Third colours

Çorluspor 1947 is a Turkish football club based in Çorlu.

== History ==
Çorluspor 1947 (with club code 011578) was founded as Çorlu Sanayispor in 1991. In 2014 the name was changed into Çorluspor 1947 and the colours were changed to red and yellow.

The club has lost their licensed manager Ersin Aka after an assault which cost him his life on 22 November 2024.

== League participations ==
- TFF Third League: 2024–
- Turkish Regional Amateur League: 2015–19, 2022–2024
- Amateur Leagues: 1991–2015, 2019–2022
