= Ankara Aktepe Stadium =

Multi-use stadium in Ankara, Turkey

Aktepe Stadium
- Keçiören Aktepe Stadyumu
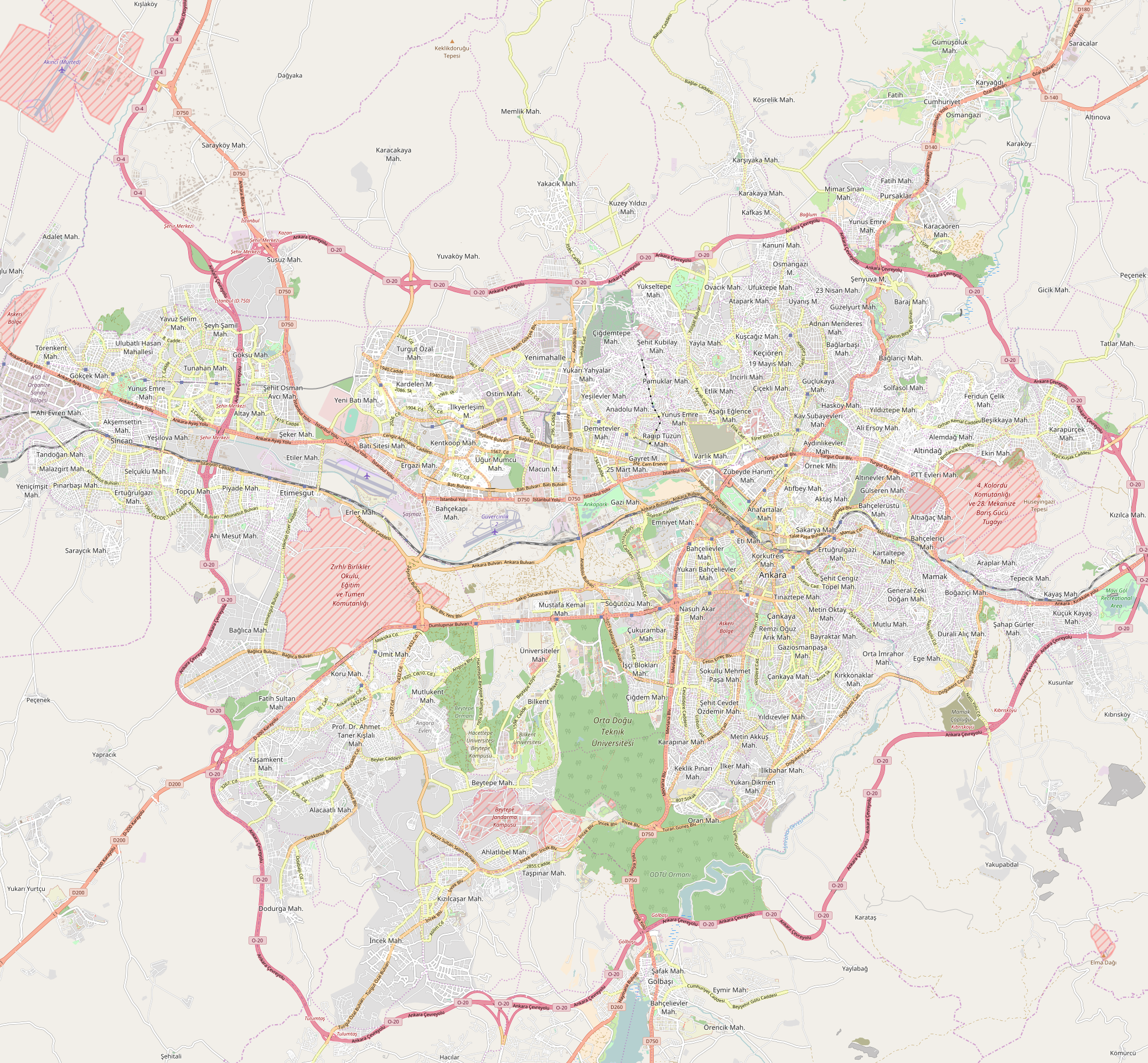
- Location within Ankara Location within Turkey
- Address: Ankara; Turkey
- Coordinates: 39°59′56.97″N 32°52′50.66″E
- Capacity: 5,000
- Type: Stadium

Construction
- Built: 1999

Tenant
- Keçiörengücü

Aktepe Stadium is a multi-use stadium in Ankara, Turkey. It is currently used mostly for football matches and is the home of Keçiörengücü. The stadium holds 5,000 people and was built in 1999.
