= Esenler =

- District and municipality
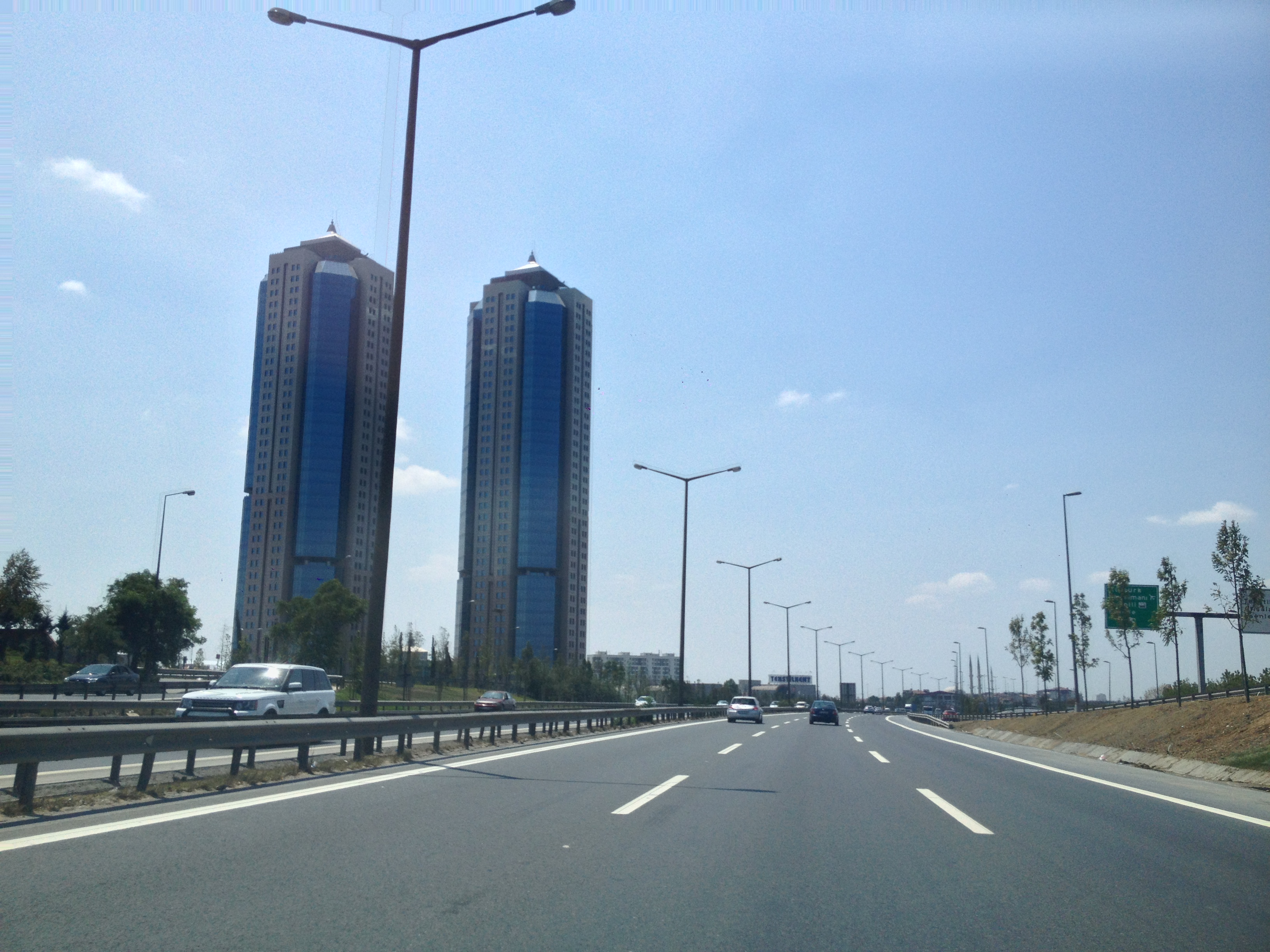
- Tekstilkent Towers

- Logo

- Map showing Esenler District in Istanbul Province

- Location within Turkey Location within Istanbul
- Coordinates: 41°02′02″N 28°53′25″E
- Country: Turkey
- Province: Istanbul

Government
  - Mayor: Tevfik Göksu (AKP)
- Area: 43 km^{2} (17 sq mi)
- Population (2022): 445,421
  - Density: 10,000/km^{2} (27,000/sq mi)
- Time zone: UTC+3 (TRT)
- Area code: 0212
- Website: www.esenler.bel.tr

Esenler is a municipality and district of Istanbul Province, Turkey. Its area is 43 km^{2}, and its population is 445,421 (2022). It is on its European side. Esenler is mainly densely packed, working class residential in the midst of its industrial neighbouring districts of Gaziosmanpaşa, Güngören and Bağcılar. The mayor is Tevfik Göksu.

== History ==
In the Ottoman times this area, well outside the city walls, was the villages of Litros and Avas, populated by Greek farmers. During the 1923 population exchange between Greece and Turkey, these villagers were deported and the area was then settled by Turks who had themselves been deported from Macedonia. Christian Orthodox Romani people from Esenler settled in Amaliada four decades after population exchange. It was part of Bakırköy district till 1992 and Güngören between 1992 and 1994.

== Composition ==
There are 17 neighbourhoods in Esenler District:

- 15 Temmuz
- Birlik
- Çifte Havuzlar
- Davutpaşa
- Fatih
- Fevzi Çakmak
- Havaalanı
- Kazım Karabekir
- Kemer
- Menderes
- Mimar Sinan
- Namık Kemal
- Nine Hatun
- Oruçreis
- Tuna
- Turgut Reis
- Yavuz Selim

== Esenler today ==
Many of the large numbers of people that migrated to Istanbul in the 60s to 90s ended up in districts like this and with a population of over half a million Esenler has desperately insufficient infrastructure, leading to over-crowded schoolrooms and many other problems.

The tr:15 Temmuz, Esenler neighbourhood was established in March 2020 by the acquisition of the 47th Motorised Infantry Regiment Command barracks area by the Esenler municipality.

== Sport ==
Opened in 2017, the Esenler Stadium is located in the "Esenler Sports Village" in Kemer Neeighborhood.
