= Batman Petrolspor =

Turkish football club

- Full name: Batman Petrol Spor Kulübü
- Founded: 1960; 66 years ago
- Stadium: Batman Stadium
- Capacity: 15,000
- Coordinates: 37°51′25″N 41°07′58″E
- Owner: TPAO
- President: Mehmet Hakan Toy
- Head coach: Selçuk Şahin
- League: TFF 1. Lig
- 2025–26: TFF 2. Lig, White, 1st of 19 (promoted)
- Website: https://petrolspor.com/
Home colours	Away colours

Batman Petrol Spor Kulübü is a professional Turkish football club located in the city of Batman. Formed in 1960, the club colours are red, white, and black and they play their home matches at Batman Stadium. The club is named Petrolspor because Batman is the largest producer of oil in Turkey. The club is owned by TPAO.

== History ==
Batman Petrolspor was founded in 1960 with several branches including athletics, basketball, football, swimming, volleyball, and wrestling. The club played amateur football in the Diyarbakır regional leagues until 1986 when they won promotion to the 3. Lig. The club won promotion to the 2. Lig soon after and competed in the division for several years.

They have never won promotion to the Süper Lig, falling in the 2. Lig promotion semi-finals to Göztepe. The club were relegated to the 3.Lig at the end of the 2005–06 season. Their greatest success in the Turkish Cup came in 1977 when they reached the fourth round, losing to Kocaelispor 3–0 on aggregate. At the time, Batman Petrolspor were still competing in the Turkish Regional Amateur League. After winning the TFF Third League 2nd Group in the 2023-24 season, the club managed the following season to win the TFF Second League White Group earning a place in the TFF First League.

== Stadium ==
The club plays its home matches at Batman Stadium. The stadium seats 15,000 spectators. The club previously played its home matches at the 16 Mayıs Stadium.

== Noted players ==
Batman Petrolspor have produced Orhan Kapucu, a Batman native, and Ozan İpek, both capped by the Turkey national football team. Kapucu went on to play for several clubs, most notably Fenerbahçe. He earned his solitary cap in a Euro 1988 qualifying match against Northern Ireland on 12 November 1986. İpek currently plays for Bursaspor, winning the 2009-10 Süper Lig. He earned his first cap for the Turkey national football team in a friendly match against Honduras on 3 March 2010.

== Current squad ==
As of 2 September 2026

Note: Flags indicate national team as defined under FIFA eligibility rules; some limited exceptions apply. Players may hold more than one non-FIFA nationality.

No.	Pos.	Nation	Player
3	DF	TUR	Yasir Subaşı
4	DF	TUR	Metehan Mert
5	MF	TUR	Emirhan Aydoğan
6	MF	KOR	Jo Jin-ho (on loan from Konyaspor)
7	FW	MTQ	Mickaël Biron (on loan from Nürnberg)
8	MF	TUR	Oğuz Gürbulak
9	FW	VEN	Sergio Córdova (on loan from Young Boys)
10	MF	BRA	Pedrinho
11	DF	ALB	Omar Imeri
13	GK	TUR	Birkan Tetik
15	MF	BRA	David Kaiki
17	MF	TUR	Gökhan Karadeniz
18	FW	TUR	Karan Topdemir
21	DF	BRA	Dória

No.	Pos.	Nation	Player
25	GK	TUR	Çağlar Akbaba
26	MF	TUR	Rahman Buğra Çağıran
27	DF	TUR	Ömürcan Artan
28	DF	TUR	Murat Sipahioğlu
34	MF	SEN	Mamadou Cissokho
46	DF	TUR	Devran Bozardiç
53	DF	TUR	Mücahit Albayrak
72	FW	TUR	Polat Yaldır
77	MF	POR	Benny
79	FW	TUR	Gökhan Altıparmak
84	DF	TUR	Turgut Arda Görmüş
85	DF	TUR	Ali İmran Işık
86	GK	TUR	Yusuf Bakır

=== Out on loan ===
Note: Flags indicate national team as defined under FIFA eligibility rules; some limited exceptions apply. Players may hold more than one non-FIFA nationality.

No.	Pos.	Nation	Player
—	GK	TUR	Atalay Gökçe (at 68 Aksaray Belediyespor until 30 June 2027)
—	MF	TUR	Muhammed Duha Aydın (at Büyükcekmece until 30 June 2027)

No.	Pos.	Nation	Player
—	FW	TUR	Semih Kaan Toker (at Büyükcekmece until 30 June 2027)
—	FW	TUR	Furkan Rüzgar (at Ankara Demirspor until 30 June 2027)
