= Mardin 1969 S.K. =

- Full name: Mardin 1969 Spor Kulübü
- Founded: 2015; 11 years ago (as Mardin Büyükşehir Belediyespor)
- Ground: Mardin 21 Kasım Stadium, Mardin
- Capacity: 5,700
- Coordinates: 37°18′56″N 40°43′37″E
- Chairman: Rıdvan Aşar
- Manager: Ivaylo Petev
- League: 1. Lig
- 2025–26: 2. Lig, 2nd (promoted)
- Website: store.mardin1969spor.org.tr
Home colours	Away colours

Mardin 1969 Spor is a Turkish football club located in Mardin, Turkey. They play their home games in Mardin 21 Kasım Stadium in Mardin. The club was founded in 2015 after the dissolve of Mardinspor. The club colors were red-navy. The team plays in 1. Lig, the second level of Turkish football.

== History ==
The club was founded in 2015 in the city of Mardin as Mardin Büyükşehir Belediyespor, as the successor to Mardinspor, which had dissolved months earlier due to financial problems. The club won the Mardin First Amateur League in the 2017–18 season, earning a promotion play-off against Derikspor for a place in the Regional Amateur League. They won the match 2–0 and secured promotion to the Regional Amateur League.

In the 2018–19 season, they finished second in their Regional Amateur League group and retained their place in the league by defeating Kızıltepespor 1–0 in the promotion/relegation play-off. In June 2019, the club changed its name to Mardin Büyükşehir Belediye Başakspor.

During the 2019–20 Regional Amateur League season, the club was leading Group 1 after 20 matchdays when the season was suspended due to the COVID-19 pandemic. Despite the cancellation, they were declared champions and were promoted to the TFF 3. Lig for the first time in their history.

Before the start of the 2020–21 season, the club changed its name to Mardin Fosfatspor. In its first season in the Third League, competing in Group 2, the club finished seventh with 48 points.

Before the 2021–22 season, the club changed its name once again to Mardin 1969 Spor. That season, they lost 2–1 at home to Çankaya F.K. in the final league match, finishing 15th with 37 points and being relegated to the Regional Amateur League. After winning Group 1 of the Regional Amateur League in the 2022–23 season, Mardin 1969 Spor earned promotion back to the Third League.

In the 2024–25 season, the club competed in Group 4 of the Third League. They defeated Orduspor 1967 4–2 in the final league match, finishing behind Sebat Gençlikspor only on goal difference, but still secured promotion to the TFF 2. Lig.

In the 2025–26 season, the club competed in the Red Group of the Second League for the first time. They finished second behind Bursaspor, qualifying for the TFF First League promotion play-offs. In the semi-finals, they drew 0–0 with Kahramanmaraş İstiklalspor in the first leg, and after another 0–0 draw in the second leg, won the penalty shoot-out 6–5 to reach the final. In the promotion play-off final, Mardin 1969 Spor faced Muşspor at Diyarbakır Stadium and won 2–1, securing promotion to the TFF First League for the first time in the club's history.

== Current squad ==
As of 14 November 2026

Note: Flags indicate national team as defined under FIFA eligibility rules; some limited exceptions apply. Players may hold more than one non-FIFA nationality.

No.	Pos.	Nation	Player
1	GK	TUR	Erce Kardeşler
3	DF	TUR	Nafican Yardimci
4	DF	TUR	Ömer Karslioğlu
7	MF	TUR	Şahverdi Çetin
8	MF	SRB	Đorđe Denić
9	FW	NGR	Olarenwaju Kayode
10	FW	BUL	Zdravko Dimitrov
11	MF	TUR	Bünyamin Balat
15	DF	TUR	Uğur Gezer
16	MF	TUR	Adem Eren Kabak (on loan from Konyaspor)
17	DF	TUR	Eray Korkmaz (on loan from Çaykur Rizespor)
19	MF	TUR	Ahmet Ülük
25	DF	TUR	Mustafa Şengül

No.	Pos.	Nation	Player
27	DF	TUR	Kerim Alıcı
29	GK	TUR	Ömer Kahveci
31	GK	TUR	Emir Kireççi
33	DF	TUR	Emre Taşdemir
42	MF	UGA	Baba Alhassan
45	FW	TUR	Osman Yıldırım
47	FW	ENG	Mallik Wilks
64	DF	AUT	Berkay Dogan
70	MF	TUR	Enes Erol
77	FW	TUR	Denizhan Taşkan
91	MF	CRO	Tonio Teklić (on loan from Widzew Łódź)
—	DF	TUR	Burak Çelik
—	MF	FRA	Abdullah Aydın

=== Out on loan ===
Note: Flags indicate national team as defined under FIFA eligibility rules; some limited exceptions apply. Players may hold more than one non-FIFA nationality.

No.	Pos.	Nation	Player
—	DF	TUR	Vural Altan (at Bitlis 1916 until 30 June 2027)
—	MF	TUR	Mesih Kayabaş (at Yeni Mersin İY until 30 June 2027)

No.	Pos.	Nation	Player
—	MF	TUR	Kerem Kurşun (at Kırıkkale until 30 June 2027)
—	MF	TUR	Rojhat Sağlam (at Karadeniz Ereğli 1980 until 30 June 2027)

== League history ==
- 1. Lig: 1 season

2026-

- 2. Lig: 1 season

2025-2026

- 3. Lig: 4 seasons

2020-2022, 2023-2025

- Bölgesel Amatör Lig: 3 seasons

2018-2020, 2022-2023

- Amatör Lig: 3 sesons

2015-2018
