= Esenler Erokspor =

Association football club in Turkey

- Full name: Esenler Erokspor Kulübü
- Founded: 16 November 1959; 66 years ago
- Ground: Esenler Stadium, Istanbul
- Capacity: 5,296
- Coordinates: 41°03′15″N 28°52′47″E
- President: Zafer Topaloğlu
- Head coach: Hikmet Karaman
- League: TFF 1. Lig
- 2025–26: TFF 1. Lig, 3rd of 20
- Website: www.eroksporfk.com
Home colours	Away colours

Esenler Erokspor Kulübü is a Turkish professional sports club based in Esenler, Istanbul. Founded on 16 November 1959, the club is best known for its football department, which currently competes in the TFF First League, the second tier of the Turkish football league system. The team plays its home matches at the Esenler Stadium (also known as Esenler Erokspor Stadium), which has an all-seater capacity of 5,291.

Esenler Erokspor achieved significant success in the mid-2020s, earning promotion to the TFF First League as champions of the TFF Second League following the 2023–24 season. After finishing 12th in their debut First League campaign in 2024–25, the club emerged as a promotion contender for the Süper Lig during the 2025–26 season. Under the management of head coach Osman Özköylü, who was appointed in March 2025, the team maintained a high league position throughout early 2026, including a notable five-match winning streak in February that solidified their second-place standing. Key players during this period included top scorer Olarenwaju Kayode, Hamza Čataković, and Ryan Jack, with the squad further bolstered by the loan signing of Ömer Faruk Beyaz in January 2026.

In addition to football, the club operates a professional basketball division, known as Safiport Erokspor for sponsorship reasons, which competes in the Basketbol Süper Ligi.

== History ==
Esenler Erokspor was founded on 16 November 1959 in the Kasımpaşa/Sinanpaşa neighborhood of Beyoğlu, Istanbul, originally under the name Erokspor. The club's official colors are green and yellow. During its long history in the amateur leagues, the club became notable for its association with future Turkish President Recep Tayyip Erdoğan, who played for the team as an amateur. Other prominent political figures who represented the club in their youth include former Speaker of the Grand National Assembly Mehmet Ali Şahin and former Minister of Youth and Sports Osman Aşkın Bak.

The club began a rapid ascent through the professional tiers in the 2010s. After winning the Istanbul 1st Amateur League in 2013 and the Regional Amateur League (BAL) in 2017, the club secured promotion to the TFF Third League. In 2018, the club underwent corporate restructuring under President Zafer Topaloğlu, relocated its headquarters to the Esenler district, and adopted its current name. During this period, it also established a partnership as a pilot team for İstanbul Başakşehir F.K.

Esenler Erokspor reached the TFF Second League in 2022 and achieved a historic promotion to the TFF First League (the second tier of Turkish football) as champions of the 2. Lig Beyaz Group in the 2023–24 season. After finishing 12th in its debut First League season (2024–25), the club emerged as a promotion contender in the 2025–26 campaign under head coach Osman Özköylü, holding second place in the standings as of February 2026. Additionally, the club's basketball division, Safiport Erokspor, won the Turkish Basketball First League (TBL) playoffs in May 2025 to earn promotion to the top-tier Basketbol Süper Ligi (BSL) for the 2025–26 season.

== Stadium ==
Esenler Erokspor plays its home matches at the Esenler Stadium , also known as the Esenler Erokspor Stadium, located in the Kemer neighborhood of the Esenler district in Istanbul. The stadium has a total seating capacity of 5,291 and features a natural grass pitch measuring 105 by 68 meters. The facility is equipped with floodlighting for evening matches and includes four covered grandstands. The pitch surface was renovated in 2020 to comply with professional league requirements following the club's ascent through the Turkish football pyramid.

== Fans ==
The club's supporter base is primarily concentrated within the Esenler district of Istanbul. The fans are known for their strong local identity and community-driven support, often referred to as "Esenlerli futbolseverler" (Esenler football lovers). Organized support has grown significantly since the club's relocation to the district, with the local municipality frequently collaborating with the club to facilitate fan attendance and community engagement events at the Esenler Stadium.

== Recent history and statistics ==
Esenler Erokspor has experienced a period of rapid success in the mid-2020s. After competing in the TFF Second League for several years, the club secured promotion to the TFF First League by finishing as champions of the White Group in the 2023–24 season, recording 83 points from 36 matches.

In their debut season in the TFF First League (2024–25), the club established itself as a competitive mid-table side, finishing the campaign in 12th place with 52 points. As of February 2026, during the 2025–26 season, Esenler Erokspor has emerged as a promotion contender for the Süper Lig, currently occupying 2nd place in the standings with 59 points after 28 matches.

Recent League Performance
Season	League	Rank	Pld	W	D	L	GF	GA	Pts	Result
2023–24	TFF 2. Lig	1st	36	26	5	5	83	29	83	Promoted
2024–25	TFF 1. Lig	12th	38	13	13	12	53	50	52	Mid-table
2025–26	TFF 1. Lig	2nd	33	19	9	5	76	31	66	In progress

== Current squad ==
As of 23 September 2026

Note: Flags indicate national team as defined under FIFA eligibility rules; some limited exceptions apply. Players may hold more than one non-FIFA nationality.

No.	Pos.	Nation	Player
2	DF	TUR	Oğulcan Kestane
4	DF	BRA	Luccas Claro
5	MF	TUR	Mikail Okyar
6	MF	TUR	Tugay Kacar (captain)
7	MF	FRA	Nicolas Janvier
8	MF	GAB	Guélor Kanga
9	FW	TUR	Kubilay Kanatsızkuş
10	MF	TUR	Recep Niyaz
11	FW	SEN	Mame Mor Faye (on loan from Çaykur Rizespor)
14	DF	TUR	Onur Ulaş
17	MF	TUR	Burak Çoban
18	FW	PAR	Braian Samudio
20	MF	BIH	Muhamed Buljubašić (on loan from Çaykur Rizespor)

No.	Pos.	Nation	Player
21	DF	TUR	Bahadır Öztürk
22	GK	TUR	Erdem Canpolat (on loan from Çaykur Rizespor)
27	MF	TUR	Ferhat Yazgan
33	DF	TUR	Enes Alıç
34	GK	TUR	Ertuğrul Çetin
39	DF	TUR	Erkan Kaş
52	FW	TUR	Yusuf Özyurt
53	MF	TUR	Yusuf Erdoğan
67	GK	TUR	Doğukan Demir
70	DF	TUR	Furkan Orak (on loan from Çaykur Rizespor)
77	DF	TUR	Hayrullah Bilazer
88	FW	KOS	Altin Zeqiri
99	FW	SEN	Pape Habib Guèye (on loan from Kasımpaşa)

=== Out on loan ===
Note: Flags indicate national team as defined under FIFA eligibility rules; some limited exceptions apply. Players may hold more than one non-FIFA nationality.

No.	Pos.	Nation	Player
—	DF	TUR	Enes Işık (at 52 Orduspor until 30 June 2027)
—	FW	TUR	Harun Genç (at Bandırmaspor until 30 June 2027)

No.	Pos.	Nation	Player
—	FW	TUR	Altar Hidayetoğlu (at Aliağa FK until 30 June 2027)
