= Ankara Keçiörengücü S.K. =

Turkish sports club

Ankara Keçiörengücü
- Full name: Ankara Keçiörengücü Spor Kulübü
- Founded: 1987
- Ground: Ankara Aktepe Stadium
- Capacity: 4,518
- Coordinates: 39°59′57″N 32°52′51″E
- Chairman: Sedat Tahiroğlu
- Head coach: Osman Zeki Korkmaz
- League: TFF 1. Lig
- 2025–26: TFF 1. Lig, 7th of 20
- Website: www.keciorengucu.org.tr
Home colours	Away colours	Third colours

Ankara Keçiörengücü Spor Kulübü, commonly referred to as Keçiörengücü or, due to sponsorship reasons, Emre Gökdemir İnşaat Keçiörengücü, is a Turkish sports club based in the Keçiören district of Ankara. The football club plays in the TFF First League.

== History ==
Keçiörengücü was founded as Hacettepe with black-white colours in 1945. Hacettepe was one of Turkish First League's founder teams. They played in the First League between 1958–1960 and 1962–1968. After relegation from the First League in 1967–68 season, they played second level between 1968 and 1971. They were relegated to the Third League in 1970–71 season. They played in the Third League between 1971 and 1974, 1977–1978, and 1984–1988. The club was renamed Hacettepe Yeni Camuzoğluspor in 1985. Finally they took the name Keçiörengücü and changed their colors to dark red-white in 1988. Keçiörengücü played in the Second League between 1989–1993 and 1997–1998. Keçiörengücü became champions in the Third Group of the Third League and was promoted to League B in 2006. However, it was relegated to the Third League after a 5–1 loss to Darıca Gençlerbirliği, in an away match on 13 May 2007. The club have played again in the TFF Second League since 2014. In May 2019, they gained promotion to TFF First League as champion of White Group in the TFF Second League.

== League honours ==
- Turkish Super League: 1958–60, 1962–68 (as Hacettepe)
- TFF First League: 1968–71 (as Hacettepe), 1989–93, 1997–98, 2019–
- TFF Second League: 1971–74 (as Hacettepe), 1977–78 (as Hacettepe), 1984–89 (1984–85 as Hacettepe, 1985–88 as Hacettepe Yeni Camuzoğluspor & 1988–89 as Keçiörengücü), 1993–97, 1998–01, 2006–07, 2014–19
- TFF Third League: 2001–06, 2007–2014
- Turkish Regional Amateur League: 1960–62, 1974–77 (as Hacettepe, 1978–84 (as Hacettepe)

== Players ==
=== Current squad ===
As of 23 September 2026

Note: Flags indicate national team as defined under FIFA eligibility rules; some limited exceptions apply. Players may hold more than one non-FIFA nationality.

No.	Pos.	Nation	Player
1	GK	TUR	Mehmet Erdoğan
2	DF	TUR	Yunus Bahadır
3	DF	BRA	Wellington
4	DF	AUT	Abdullah Çelik
5	DF	TUR	Oğuzcan Çalışkan
6	MF	TUR	Erkam Develi
7	MF	ALB	Odise Roshi
8	MF	TUR	İshak Karaoğul
9	FW	TUR	Ömer Faruk Demirel
10	MF	BRA	Jefferson
12	DF	TUR	Berkan Keskin
14	MF	TUR	İbrahim Akdağ (captain)
15	DF	TUR	Yunus Emre Metin

No.	Pos.	Nation	Player
16	MF	TUR	Oğuzhan Ayaydın
17	MF	TUR	Recep Taşbakır
18	GK	TUR	Emre Satılmış
19	MF	TUR	Enes Yılmaz
20	FW	MOZ	Alcídio Raice
21	FW	NGR	Francis Ezeh
22	MF	TUR	Halil Can Ayan
25	GK	TUR	Efe Kaan Yıldız
33	DF	TUR	Süleyman Luş
37	DF	TUR	Duhan Aksu
45	FW	POR	Herculano Nabian
55	FW	SEN	Mame Biram Diouf
77	FW	CIV	Moryké Fofana

=== Out on loan ===
Note: Flags indicate national team as defined under FIFA eligibility rules; some limited exceptions apply. Players may hold more than one non-FIFA nationality.

No.	Pos.	Nation	Player
—	DF	TUR	Gürkan Başkan (at Bitlis 1916 FSK until 30 June 2027)
—	MF	TUR	Emre Kaya (at Ankaraspor until 30 June 2027)

No.	Pos.	Nation	Player
—	MF	TUR	Enginalp Yamaç (at Karadeniz Ereğli 1980 SK until 30 June 2027)
