= 2022–23 Bandırmaspor season =

Bandırmaspor
2022–23 season
- Chairman: Onur Göçmez
- Manager: Mustafa Gürsel (until 10 November 2022); Mesut Bakkal (from 13 November 2022 to 4 February 2023); İlker Püren (from 5 February 2023 to 9 March 2023); Sami Uğurlu (from 19 March 2023)
- Stadium: Bandırma 17 Eylül Stadium
- TFF First League: 10th
- Turkish Cup: Fourth round
- Top goalscorer: League: Kerim Avcı (8); All: Kerim Avcı (8)

The 2022–23 season was the 58th season in the existence of Bandırmaspor and the club's third consecutive season in the second division of Turkish football. In addition to the domestic league, Bandırmaspor participated in this season's edition of the Turkish Cup. The season covers the period from 1 July 2022 to 30 June 2023.

== Players ==
=== First-team squad ===
As of 29 January 2023

Note: Flags indicate national team as defined under FIFA eligibility rules; some limited exceptions apply. Players may hold more than one non-FIFA nationality.

No.	Pos.	Nation	Player
1	GK	TUR	Hüseyin Koç
3	DF	TUR	Fatih Kuruçuk
5	MF	TUR	Oğuz Kağan Güçtekin (on loan from Westerlo)
6	MF	COD	Rémi Mulumba
7	FW	TUR	Sedat Şahintürk (on loan from Adana Demirspor)
8	MF	NED	Mustafa Saymak
9	FW	SRB	Ivan Šaponjić
10	MF	TUR	Kerim Avcı
11	FW	TUR	Atabey Çiçek (on loan from İstanbul Başakşehir)
13	DF	GRE	Georgios Koutroumpis
16	MF	TUR	Aygün Özışıkyıldız
17	DF	TUR	Okan Alkan
20	DF	POL	Mateusz Hołownia

No.	Pos.	Nation	Player
22	DF	NED	Caner Cavlan
24	GK	GRE	Ioannis Gelios
27	FW	BEN	Cebio Soukou
30	MF	SRB	Nikola Terzić
33	MF	GER	Levent Ayçiçek
35	DF	TUR	Alpay Koldaş
41	MF	TUR	Mehmet Özcan
44	MF	GUI	Sékou Camara (on loan from Westerlo)
70	MF	TUR	Emir Şenocak
77	DF	TUR	Mahmut Keskin (on loan from Galatasaray)
88	DF	TUR	Batuhan Adıgüzel
99	FW	TUR	Caner Bağ
—	DF	TUR	Sergen Piçinciol
—	MF	TUR	Aksel Aktas

=== Out on loan ===
Note: Flags indicate national team as defined under FIFA eligibility rules; some limited exceptions apply. Players may hold more than one non-FIFA nationality.

No.	Pos.	Nation	Player
—	DF	TUR	Hüseyin Eşkol (at Edirnespor until 30 June 2023)
—	MF	TUR	Abdullah Balıkçı (at Karacabey Belediyespor until 30 June 2023)

No.	Pos.	Nation	Player
—	MF	TUR	Berke Görgün (at Çatalcaspor until 30 June 2023)

== Transfers ==
=== In ===
Pos.	Player	Transferred from	Fee	Date	Source
FW	(Greece) Dimitrios Manos	(Greece) Aris	Free	1 July 2022	
DF	(Turkey) Fatih Kurucuk	(Turkey) Hatayspor	Free	11 July 2022	
FW	(Serbia) Ivan Šaponjić	(Slovakia) Slovan Bratislava	Loan	2 February 2023	

=== Out ===
Pos.	Player	Transferred to	Fee	Date	Source
MF	(Turkey) Doğan Can Davas	(Turkey) Giresunspor	Free	7 July 2022	
FW	(Senegal) Philippe Kény	(Turkey) İstanbul Başakşehir	€1.2 million	29 August 2022	
FW	(France) Malaly Dembélé	(Turkey) Ankara Keçiörengücü	Free	18 January 2023	
FW	(Greece) Dimitrios Manos	(Greece) Ionikos	Loan	31 January 2023	

== Pre-season and friendlies ==
Win Draw Loss Fixtures

== Competitions ==
=== Overall record ===
Competition	First match	Last match	Starting round	Final position	Record							
Competition	First match	Last match	Starting round	Final position	Pld	W	D	L	GF	GA	GD	Win %
TFF First League	12 August 2022	21 May 2023	Matchday 1	10th	36	15	11	10	55	58	−3	41.67
Turkish Cup	9 November 2022		Fourth round	Fourth round	1	0	0	1	0	3	−3	0.00
Total					37	15	11	11	55	61	−6	40.54

Source: Soccerway

=== TFF First League ===
==== League table ====
Pos	Team	Pld	W	D	L	GF	GA	GD	Pts
8	Manisa	36	15	11	10	53	47	+6	56 (Note: Head-to-head points: Manisa 0–0 Ankara Keçiörengücü, Ankara Keçiörengücü 0–3 Manisa)
9	Keçiörengücü	36	16	8	12	59	47	+12	56
10	Bandırmaspor	36	15	10	11	55	58	−3	55
11	Boluspor	36	14	10	12	44	46	−2	52
12	Altay (Note: Göztepe v. Altay was suspended following an attack on a goalkeeper in the 22nd minute. On 9 December 2022, TFF stated that both sides would be considered defeated 3−0.)	36	11	10	15	45	48	−3	40

Source: TFF
Rules for classification: 1) Points; 2) Head-to-head points; 3) Head-to-head goal difference; 4) Head-to-head goals scored; 5) Goal difference; 6) Goals scored

==== Results summary ====
Overall								Home						Away					
Pld	W	D	L	GF	GA	GD	Pts	W	D	L	GF	GA	GD	W	D	L	GF	GA	GD
36	15	10	11	55	57	−2	55	9	4	5	27	25	+2	6	6	6	28	32	−4

Source: Spor Toto 1. Lig

==== Results by round ====
Round	1	2	3	4	5	6	7	8	9	10	11	12	13	14	15	16	17	18	19	20	21	22	23	24	25	26	27	28	29	30	31	32	33	34	35	36	37	38
Ground		A	H	A	H	A	H	A	H	A	H	A	H	A	A	H	A	H	A		H	A	H	A	H	A	H	A	H	A	H	A	H	H	A	H	A	H
Result	B	W	W	W	D	L	D	D	L	D	D	D	W	L	W	W	D	W	W	B	W	L	L	L	L	L	W	W	L	D	W	W	W	L	D	W	L	D
Position	14	7	4	2	2	5	8	8	10	9	11	9	9	11	9	9	8	7	5	8	7	7	8	9	11	11	10	10	11	11	11	10	9	9	9	8	10	10

Source: Spor Toto 1. Lig
A = Away; H = Home; B = Bye; W = Win; D = Draw; L = Loss

==== Matches ====
The league schedule was released on 5 July.

1	Bye

20 August 2022 2	Tuzlaspor	0–2	Bandırmaspor	Istanbul
17:00 TRT (UTC+3)	Cissé (yellow card) 45+2'; Koyuncu (yellow card) 81'; Rotman (yellow card) 90'; Çamdal (yellow card) 90+7'	Report	42', 83' (pen.), (yellow card) 45+1' Avcı	Stadium: Sancaktepe Stadium; Attendance: 738; Referee: Muhammet Ali Metoğlu

28 August 2022 3	Bandırmaspor	2–1	Göztepe	Balıkesir
17:00 TRT (UTC+3)	Şahintürk 65'; Çiçek 89'	Report	Mamah (yellow card) 39'; Arslanagić (yellow card) 45+2'; Öztekin 68'	Stadium: Bandırma 17 Eylül Stadium; Referee: Turgut Doman

4 September 2022 4	Denizlispor	0–1	Bandırmaspor	Denizli
20:00 TRT (UTC+3)	Özdemir (yellow card) 67'	Report	Avcı 61'; Mulumba (yellow card) 67'; Dembélé (yellow card) 90+1'; Ayçiçek (yellow card) 90+5'	Stadium: Denizli Atatürk Stadium; Referee: Mehmet Türkmen

10 September 2022 5	Bandırmaspor	2–2	Ankara Keçiörengücü	Balıkesir
16:30 TRT (UTC+3)	Çiçek 49'; Özcan (yellow card) 62'; Kuruçuk (yellow card) 79'; Cavlan (yellow card) 82'	Report	Muhammed (yellow card) 1'; Gür 22'; Karadeniz 39'; Babaei (yellow card) 87'	Stadium: Bandırma 17 Eylül Stadium; Referee: Kutluhan Bilgiç

17 September 2022 6	Eyüpspor	4–1	Bandırmaspor	Istanbul
19:00 TRT (UTC+3)	Bayram (yellow card) 26'; Niyaz (yellow card) 45'; Sekidika 48'; Eze 50', 90' (yellow card) 90'; Dibba 83' (yellow card) 85'; Ildız (yellow card) 89'	Report	Koutroumpis (yellow card) 40'; Ayçiçek 58'; Alkan (yellow card) 73'	Stadium: Eyüp Stadium; Referee: Cihan Aydın

2 October 2022 7	Bandırmaspor	0–0	Samsunspor	Balıkesir
13:30 TRT (UTC+3)	Koutroumpis (yellow card) 59'; Cavlun (yellow card) 59'	Report	Güneren (yellow card) 27'; Tanque (penalty missed) 60'; Öztürk (yellow card) 80'	Stadium: Bandırma 17 Eylül Stadium; Referee: Yiğit Arslan

7 October 2022 8	Adanaspor	1–1	Bandırmaspor	Adana
20:00 TRT (UTC+3)	Aksu (yellow card) 16'; Yeşil 53' (pen.), (yellow card) 55'; Çamoğlu (yellow card) 59'; Tetteh (yellow card) 67'	Report	Mulumba (yellow card) 4'; Avcı 47', (yellow card) 61'; Keskin (yellow card) 51'; Saymak (yellow card) 89'	Stadium: New Adana Stadium; Referee: Ozan Ergün

16 October 2022 9	Bandırmaspor	0–2	Yeni Malatyaspor	Balıkesir
13:30 TRT (UTC+3)	Alkan (yellow card) 54'; Mulumba (yellow card) 66'	Report	Osman 8', 75'; Özçiçek (yellow card) 70'; Kavlak (yellow card) 72'; Başdaş (yellow card) 90+4'	Stadium: Bandırma 17 Eylül Stadium; Referee: Reşat Onur Coşkunses

23 October 2022 10	Bodrumspor	1–1	Bandırmaspor	Muğla
13:30 TRT (UTC+3)	Aydın (yellow card) 19'; Güneş (yellow card) 30'; Jahović (yellow card) 32'; Yalçın 43'	Report	Özcan (yellow card) 24'; Cavlun (yellow card) 32'; Dembélé 38'; Ayçiçek (yellow card) 41'; Avcı (yellow card) 45+1'; Tshibangu (yellow card) 77'	Stadium: Bodrum İlçe Stadium; Referee: Burak Pakkan

29 October 2022 11	Bandırmaspor	1–1	Çaykur Rizespor	Balıkesir
13:30 TRT (UTC+3)	Avcı (yellow card) 39'; Koutroumpis (yellow card) 56'; Dembélé 68'; Alkan (yellow card) 85'	Report	Bolasie (yellow card) 8', (goal) 48'; Topçu (yellow card) 26'; Papa (yellow card) 52'; Potuk (yellow card) 81'	Stadium: Bandırma 17 Eylül Stadium; Referee: Emre Kargın

5 November 2022 12	Altay	1–1	Bandırmaspor	İzmir
19:00 TRT (UTC+3)	Yıldırım (yellow card) 45'; Öztürk (yellow card) 45'; Paixão 83'	Report	Mulumba (yellow card) 45'; Saymak 65'; Gelios (yellow card) 70'; Tshibangu (yellow card) 90+2'; Koldaş (yellow card) 90+3'	Stadium: Alsancak Mustafa Denizli Stadium; Referee: Mehmet Türkmen

13 November 2022 13	Bandırmaspor	2–1	Manisa	Balıkesir
13:30 TRT (UTC+3)	Şahin 5' (o.g.); Koutroumpis (yellow card) 42'; Avcı (yellow card) 58', (penalty missed) 90'; Ayçiçek 77'; Dembélé (yellow card) 82'	Report	Şahin (yellow card) 37'; Gakpa 71'; Karapo (yellow card) 82'	Stadium: Bandırma 17 Eylül Stadium; Referee: Eren Özyemişcioğlu

20 November 2022 14	Sakaryaspor	4–2	Bandırmaspor	Sakarya
19:00 TRT (UTC+3)	Taşcı 9', 45', 73'; Odabaşoğlu (yellow card) 17'; Erdoğan (yellow card) 45+5'; Roshi (yellow card) 61'; Woolery 90'; Nalepa (red card) 90+4'	Report	Kuruçuk (yellow card) 39'; Hołownia (yellow card) 45+5'; Cavlun 58'; Şahintürk (yellow card) 60'; Tshibangu (yellow card) 78' (yellow-red card) 90+6'; Koldaş (yellow card) 90+3'; Çiçek 90+7'	Stadium: New Sakarya Atatürk Stadium; Referee: Oğuzhan Aksu

27 November 2022 15	Erzurumspor	1–2	Bandırmaspor	Erzurum
16:00 TRT (UTC+3)	Tozlu 47'; Olanare (yellow card) 48'; Özhan (yellow card) 90+3'	Report	Çiçek (yellow card) 45+1'; Koldaş (yellow card) 56'; Avcı 63', 87'; Şahintürk (yellow card) 78'; Bağ (yellow card) 83'; Dembélé (yellow card) 90+3'	Stadium: Kazım Karabekir Stadium; Referee: Muhammet Ali Metoğlu

3 December 2022 16	Bandırmaspor	1–0	Altınordu	Balıkesir
13:30 TRT (UTC+3)	Çiçek 27'; Kuruçuk (yellow card) 41'; Avcı (yellow card) 69'	Report	Arslan (yellow card) 58'; Yöntem (yellow card) 78'	Stadium: Bandırma 17 Eylül Stadium; Referee: Alper Akarsu

11 December 2022 17	Boluspor	2–2	Bandırmaspor	Bolu
13:30 TRT (UTC+3)	Baldé (yellow card) 13'; Kayamba 28'; Alsan (penalty missed) 37'; Ulaş (yellow card) 52'; Oularé 70' (yellow card) 71'; Bilgiç (yellow card) 90+5'	Report	Çiçek 13' (pen.); Kuruçuk 90+2'; Avcı (yellow card) 90+5'	Stadium: Bolu Atatürk Stadium; Referee: Ramazan Keleş

18 December 2022 18	Bandırmaspor	1–0	Pendikspor	Balıkesir
13:30 TRT (UTC+3)	Çiçek (penalty missed) 43'; Avcı 90+5'	Report	Kappel (yellow card) 76'	Stadium: Bandırma 17 Eylül Stadium; Referee: Ömer Faruk Turtay

25 December 2022 19	Gençlerbirliği	2–5	Bandırmaspor	Ankara
16:00 TRT (UTC+3)	Altıparmak (yellow card) 52'; Gül 52', 85' (pen.); Aktaş (yellow card) 64'	Report	Kuruçuk 21'; Şahintürk 29'; Avcı 66'; Ayçiçek 70'; Saymak 93'	Stadium: Eryaman Stadium; Referee: Ozan Ergün

20	Bye

21 January 2023 21	Bandırmaspor	4–1	Tuzlaspor	Balıkesir
13:30 TRT (UTC+3)	Kuruçuk 13'; Koldaş (yellow card) 64'; Mulumba (yellow card) 66'; Şahintürk 69'; Manos 72', 90'	Report	N'Zuzi Mata 2'; İsmail Konuk (yellow card) 45+4'; Imbula (yellow card) 45+5'; Bayrak (yellow card) 55'; Karaduman (yellow card) 75'	Stadium: Bandırma 17 Eylül Stadium; Referee: Alpaslan Şen

27 January 2023 22	Göztepe	3–1	Bandırmaspor	İzmir
20:00 TRT (UTC+3)	Öztekin 3', 44'; Atanga 85'; Arslanagić (yellow card) 90+1'	Report	Soukou 27'; Çiçek (yellow card) 90'; Mulumba (yellow card) 90+5'	Stadium: Gürsel Aksel Stadium; Referee: Mehmet Türkmen

4 February 2023 23	Bandırmaspor	1–4	Denizlispor	Balıkesir
13:30 TRT (UTC+3)	Šaponjić 66'; Cavlun (yellow card) 90+3'	Report	Yılmaz 64'; Bekir Turaç Böke 78'; Mustafa Çeçenoğlu 79'; Emre Sağlık (yellow card) 89'; Özer Özdemir 90+3'	Stadium: Bandırma 17 Eylül Stadium; Referee: Ayberk Demirbaş

4 March 2023 24	Ankara Keçiörengücü	3–1	Bandırmaspor	Ankara
13:30 TRT (UTC+3)	İnan (penalty missed) 18'; Yayıkcı (yellow card) 23'; Dembélé (yellow card) 45+1'; Yardımcı (yellow card) 45+5'; Karadeniz (yellow card) 45+6', (goal) 74'; Muhammed 77'; Anderson 90+4', (yellow card) 90+4'	Report	Mulumba (yellow card) 45+5'; Aktaş (yellow card) 45+5'; Šaponjić 59'	Stadium: Aktepe Stadium; Referee: Reşat Onur Coşkunses

9 March 2023 25	Bandırmaspor	0–1	Eyüpspor	Balıkesir
14:30 TRT (UTC+3)	Šaponjić (yellow card) 45+5'; Koutroumpis (yellow card) 59'; Mulumba (yellow card) 86'; Avcı (yellow card) 90+7'	Report	Akbunar 20'; Demirok (yellow card) 33'; İlter (yellow card) 59'; Babel (yellow card) 90+1'	Stadium: Bandırma 17 Eylül Stadium; Referee: Burak Olcar

13 March 2023 26	Samsunspor	5–0	Bandırmaspor	Samsun
20:00 TRT (UTC+3)	Sağat 32' (pen.); Piçinciol 71' (o.g.); Fofana 80'; Demir 85'; Fofana 90+1'	Report	Pi̇çi̇nci̇ol (yellow card) 23'; Güçtekin (yellow card) 25'; Koutroumpis (red card) 29'; Šaponjić (yellow card) 49'; Soukou (red card) 74'	Stadium: Samsun Stadium; Referee: Kutluhan Bi̇lgi̇ç

27	Bandırmaspor	3–0 (w/o)	Adanaspor	Balıkesir
		Report		Stadium: Bandırma 17 Eylül Stadium

28	Yeni Malatyaspor	0–3 (w/o)	Bandırmaspor	Malatya
		Report		Stadium: New Malatya Stadium

29 March 2023 29	Bandırmaspor	0–4	Bodrumspor	Balıkesir
14:30 TRT (UTC+3)	Mulumba (yellow card) 4' (yellow-red card) 28'; Cavlun (yellow card) 32'	Report	Bayrakdar 20', 78'; Yalçın 35'; Özer 42'; Mohammed (yellow card) 62'	Stadium: Bandırma 17 Eylül Stadium; Referee: Gürcan Hasova

2 April 2023 30	Çaykur Rizespor	0–0	Bandırmaspor	Rize
19:00 TRT (UTC+3)	Bolasie (yellow card) 23'; Potuk (yellow card) 83'; Pala (yellow card) 90+7'	Report	Keskin (yellow card) 23'; Yoldaş (yellow card) 33'; Çiçek (yellow card) 71'; Koutroumpis (yellow card) 82'; Ayçiçek (yellow card) 84'; Güçtekin (yellow card) 90+4'	Stadium: Çaykur Didi Stadium; Referee: Burak Şeker

9 April 2023 31	Bandırmaspor	2–1	Altay	Balıkesir
16:00 TRT (UTC+3)	Çiçek 2'; Özcan (yellow card) 35'; Mulumba (yellow card) 55'; Koutroumpis (red card) 55'; Soukou 78'	Report	Erdoğan (yellow card) 20' (yellow-red card) 55'; Kadah 45+5'; Sarıkaya (yellow card) 59'	Stadium: Bandırma 17 Eylül Stadium; Referee: Feridun Daldaş

12 April 2023 32	Manisa	0–1	Bandırmaspor	Manisa
16:00 TRT (UTC+3)	Fernandes (yellow card) 60'; Domgjoni (yellow card) 71'; Büyük (yellow card) 81'; Tabla (yellow card) 90+4'	Report	Kaplan (yellow card) 8'; Koldaş (red card) 17'; Ayçiçek (yellow card) 68'; Soukou 74'; Çiçek (yellow card) 90+5'	Stadium: Mümin Özkasap Stadium; Referee: Ömer Faruk Turtay

17 April 2023 33	Bandırmaspor	3–2	Sakaryaspor	Balıkesir
16:00 TRT (UTC+3)	Šaponjić 28', (yellow card) 90+4'; Şengül (yellow card) 34'; Piçinciol 36'; Özcan (yellow card) 89'; Tetteh 90+2'	Report	Donkor 62'; Kurt 90+1'	Stadium: Bandırma 17 Eylül Stadium; Referee: Cihan Aydın

24 April 2023 34	Bandırmaspor	2–4	Erzurumspor	Balıkesir
16:00 TRT (UTC+3)	Güçtekin (yellow card) 24'; Šaponjić 38'; Bağ 59'; Keskin (yellow card) 65'; Mulumba (yellow card) 81'	Report	Artarslan (yellow card) 41'; Şaşi (yellow card) 45+1'; Yumlu (yellow card) 47'; Özhan 75'; Tozlu 89', (yellow card) 89'; Rosheuvel 90', 90+13'; Akbaş (yellow card) 90+2'	Stadium: Bandırma 17 Eylül Stadium; Referee: Alper Akarsu

30 April 2023 35	Altınordu	3–3	Bandırmaspor	İzmir
16:00 TRT (UTC+3)	Aydın (yellow card) 45+7'; Fındıklı 80'; Özek 85' (pen.); Özgün 90+6', (yellow card) 90+6'	Report	Özcan (yellow card) 23'; Terzić (yellow card) 37'; Šaponjić 50', 64', 75'; Kaplan (yellow card) 90+4'	Stadium: Bornova Aziz Kocaoğlu Stadium; Referee: Ali Palabıyık

7 May 2023 36	Bandırmaspor	2−1	Boluspor	Balıkesir
16:00 TRT (UTC+3)	Soukou 9'; Mulumba 23', (yellow card) 58'	Report	Demir 74'	Stadium: Bandırma 17 Eylül Stadium; Referee: Murat Erdoğan

16 May 2023 37	Pendikspor	2–1	Bandırmaspor	Istanbul
17:00 TRT (UTC+3)	Akça (yellow card) 24'; Kara (yellow card) 42'; Aosman 48'; Thuram 52'; Tekdal (yellow card) 65'	Report	Keskin (yellow card) 47'; Šaponjić 29', (yellow card) 57'	Stadium: Pendik Stadium; Referee: Arda Kardeşler

21 May 2023 38	Bandırmaspor	1–1	Gençlerbirliği	Balıkesir
16:00 TRT (UTC+3)	Soukou 21'; Kaplan (yellow card) 75'	Report	Çağıran (yellow card) 27'; Durak 52' (pen.); Ertürk (yellow card) 68'; Doukara (yellow card) 72'; Akabueze (yellow card) 76'; Eyibil (yellow card) 90+1'	Stadium: Bandırma 17 Eylül Stadium; Referee: Burak Şeker

=== Turkish Cup ===
9 November 2022 Fourth round	Bandırmaspor	0–3	Karacabey Belediyespor	Balıkesir
14:00 TRT (UTC+3)	Camara (yellow card) 1'; Avcı (yellow card) 77'; Saymak (yellow card) 88'; Hołownia (yellow card) 90+2'		Gümüş (yellow card) 32'; Ertürk 46'; Eren (yellow card) 77'; Diler 82'; Türk 87'	Stadium: Bandırma 17 Eylül Stadium; Referee: Feridun Daldaş
