= 2022–23 Yeni Malatyaspor season =

Yeni Malatyaspor
2022–23 season
- Chairman: Ahmet Yaman
- Manager: Cihat Arslan (until 4 October 2022); Hasan Özer (from 5 October 2022 to 30 December 2022); Yılmaz Vural (from 31 December 2022)
- Stadium: New Malatya Stadium
- TFF First League: 19th (withdrew)
- Turkish Cup: Fourth round
- Top goalscorer: League: Cengizhan Akgün (7 goals); All: Cengizhan Akgün (7 goals)

The 2022–23 season was the 37th season in the existence of Yeni Malatyaspor and the club's first season back in the second division of Turkish football since 2017. In addition to the domestic league, Yeni Malatyaspor participated in this season's edition of the Turkish Cup. The season covers the period from 1 July 2022 to 30 June 2023.

== Players ==
=== First-team squad ===
As of 24 February 2023

Note: Flags indicate national team as defined under FIFA eligibility rules; some limited exceptions apply. Players may hold more than one non-FIFA nationality.

No.	Pos.	Nation	Player
1	GK	TUR	Abdulsamed Damlu
2	DF	TUR	Yiğit Ulaş
4	DF	TUR	Alperen Arslan
6	MF	TUR	Rahman Buğra Çağıran
13	MF	GHA	Godfred Donsah
17	FW	TUR	Hüseyin Ekici
18	MF	TUR	Enes Savucu
21	GK	TUR	Oytun Özdoğan

No.	Pos.	Nation	Player
22	DF	TUR	Barış Başdaş
27	DF	TUR	Erşan Yaşa
29	MF	TUR	Berat Mert
55	DF	TUR	Emircan Bayrakdar
61	DF	TUR	Taha Gür
66	MF	BDI	Jospin Nshimirimana
85	MF	TUR	Kerem Altunışık

=== Out on loan ===
Note: Flags indicate national team as defined under FIFA eligibility rules; some limited exceptions apply. Players may hold more than one non-FIFA nationality.

No.	Pos.	Nation	Player
—	GK	TUR	Enes Salik (at Malatya Arguvan SK until 30 June 2023)
—	DF	TUR	Ferhat Canlı (at Malatya Arguvan SK until 30 June 2023)
—	MF	TUR	Fatih Gürden (at Malatya Arguvan SK until 30 June 2023)
—	MF	TUR	Burak Efe Yaz (at Malatya Arguvan SK until 30 June 2023)
—	MF	TUR	Ogün Özçiçek (at Çaykur Rizespor until 30 June 2023)
—	FW	GHA	Haqi Osman (at Çaykur Rizespor until 30 June 2023)

No.	Pos.	Nation	Player
—	DF	GHA	Philip Gameli Awuku (at Tuzlaspor until 30 June 2023)
—	FW	TUR	Cengizhan Akgün (at Kocaelispor until 30 June 2023)
—	MF	TUR	Atakan Müjde (at Pendikspor until 30 June 2023)
—	MF	TUR	Mert Miraç Altıntaş (at Kuşadasıspor until 30 June 2023)
—	MF	TUR	Berat Yaman (at Şanlıurfaspor until 30 June 2023)
99	DF	TUR	Burak Kavlak (at Esenler Erokspor until 30 June 2023)

== Pre-season and friendlies ==
Win Draw Loss Fixtures

20 July 2022 Friendly	Ankaragücü (Turkey)	3–0	(Turkey) Yeni Malatyaspor	Kayseri
17:00 TRT (UTC+3)	Sowe 45'; Macheda 64'; Derdiyok 89'	Report		Stadium: Erciyes Yüksek İrtifa Kamp Merkezi

30 July 2022 Friendly	Kayserispor (Turkey)	3–2	(Turkey) Yeni Malatyaspor	Kayseri
18:30 TRT (UTC+3)	Gavranović 47'; Thiam 53' (pen.); Carlos Mané 70'	Report	Osman 66'; Emeksiz 68'	Stadium: Kadir Has Tesisleri

== Competitions ==
=== Overall record ===
Competition	First match	Last match	Starting round	Final position	Record							
Competition	First match	Last match	Starting round	Final position	Pld	W	D	L	GF	GA	GD	Win %
TFF First League	14 August 2022	May 2023	Matchday 1	19th (withdrew)	36	4	7	25	22	81	−59	11.11
Turkish Cup	20 October 2022	8 November 2022	Third round	Fourth round	2	0	1	1	3	4	−1	0.00
Total					38	4	8	26	25	85	−60	10.53

Source: Soccerway

=== TFF First League ===
==== League table ====
Pos	Team	Pld	W	D	L	GF	GA	GD	Pts	Qualification or relegation
15	Gençlerbirliği	36	10	8	18	46	55	−9	38 (Note: Head-to-head points: Gençlerbirliği 1–2 Tuzlaspor, Tuzlaspor 1–0 Gençlerbirliği)	
16	Altınordu (R)	36	9	8	19	41	57	−16	35	Relegation to the TFF Second League
17	Adanaspor (Note: Adanaspor withdrew from the league following the 2023 Turkey–Syria earthquake and were not relegated at the end of the season.)	36	6	7	23	32	76	−44	25	Withdrew
18	Denizlispor (Note: Denizlispor have been deducted 3 points by the Club Licensing Board for failing to meet the licensing requirements.) (R)	36	7	5	24	35	67	−32	23	Relegation to the TFF Second League
19	Yeni Malatyaspor (Note: Yeni Malatyaspor have been deducted 3 points by the Club Licensing Board for failing to meet the licensing requirements. Yeni Malatyaspor withdrew from the league following the 2023 Turkey–Syria earthquake and were not relegated at the end of the season.)	36	4	7	25	22	81	−59	16	Withdrew

Source: TFF
Rules for classification: 1) Points; 2) Head-to-head points; 3) Head-to-head goal difference; 4) Head-to-head goals scored; 5) Goal difference; 6) Goals scored
(R) Relegated

==== Results summary ====
Overall								Home						Away					
Pld	W	D	L	GF	GA	GD	Pts	W	D	L	GF	GA	GD	W	D	L	GF	GA	GD
36	4	7	25	22	81	−59	16	2	3	13	7	40	−33	2	4	12	15	41	−26

Source: Spor Toto 1. Lig

==== Results by round ====
Round	1	2	3	4	5	6	7	8	9	10	11	12	13	14	15	16	17	18	19	20	21	22	23	24	25	26	27	28	29	30	31	32	33	34	35	36	37	38
Ground	A	H	A	H	A	H	A	H	A	H	A	H	A	H	A		A	H	A	H	A	H	A	H	A	H	A	H	A	H	A	H	A	H		H	A	H
Result	L	D	L	L	D	D	L	L	W	L	W	D	L	L	D	B	D	W	L	L	D	W	L	L	L	L	L	L	L	L	L	L	L	L	B	L	L	L
Position	18	16	17	19	18	18	18	18	18	18	17	16	17	17	17	17	16	16	16	17	17	17	19	19⁣	19⁣	19⁣	19⁣	19⁣	19⁣	19⁣	19⁣	19⁣	19⁣	19⁣	19⁣	19⁣	19⁣	19⁣

Source: Spor Toto 1. Lig
A = Away; H = Home; B = Bye; W = Win; D = Draw; L = Loss

==== Matches ====
The league schedule was released on 5 July.

14 August 2022 1	Bodrumspor	3–1	Yeni Malatyaspor	Muğla
17:00 TRT (UTC+3)	Yalçın 21', 35'; Özdamar 26'; Aydın (yellow card) 59'	Report	Emeksiz (yellow card) 31'; Donsah (yellow card) 50'; Akgün 75'; Çağıran (yellow card) 87'	Stadium: Bodrum İlçe Stadium; Attendance: 1,445; Referee: Direnç Tonusluoğlu

21 August 2022 2	Yeni Malatyaspor	1–1	Adanaspor	Malatya
19:15 TRT (UTC+3)	Emeksiz 55'; Mallé (yellow card) 76'	Report	Tetteh 32'; Sacko (yellow card) 88'; Etöz (yellow card) 90+3'; Bennasser (yellow card) 90+4'	Stadium: New Malatya Stadium; Attendance: 1,577; Referee: Murat Erdoğan

26 August 2022 3	Eyüpspor	3–2	Yeni Malatyaspor	Istanbul
21:00 TRT (UTC+3)	Kurt 9'; Claro 57'; Dibba 66'; Ezeh (yellow card) 79'	Report	Akgün 6', 90+5'; Kavlak (yellow card) 56'; Çağıran (yellow card) 80'; Emeksiz (yellow card) 80'; Gür (yellow card) 90+7'	Stadium: Eyüp Stadium; Referee: Kutluhan Bilgiç

3 September 2022 4	Yeni Malatyaspor	0–4	Çaykur Rizespor	Malatya
20:00 TRT (UTC+3)	Kavlak (yellow card) 30' (yellow-red card) 47'; Çağıran (red card) 34'	Report	Van den Hurk 39' (pen.), 49' (pen.); Miya 52', 73'; Coşkun (yellow card) 61'; Altınay (yellow card) 70'	Stadium: New Malatya Stadium; Referee: Tarık Güldal

11 September 2022 5	Manisa	2–2	Yeni Malatyaspor	Manisa
16:30 TRT (UTC+3)	Büyük 53' (yellow card) 90+8'; Domgjoni (yellow card) 60'; Kör 89'; Giritlioğlu (yellow card) 90+2'; Karapo (yellow card) 90+6'	Report	Akgün 10' (pen.), 63' (yellow card) 37'; Donsah (yellow card) 59'; Damlu (yellow card) 60'; Başdaş (yellow card) 60'; Mallé (yellow card) 90+6'; Osman (red card) 90+6'	Stadium: Mümin Özkasap Stadium; Referee: Yiğit Arslan

16 September 2022 6	Yeni Malatyaspor	0–0	Altay	Malatya
20:00 TRT (UTC+3)	Alkan (yellow card) 46'	Report	Özenç (yellow card) 79'	Stadium: New Malatya Stadium; Referee: Oğuzhan Çakır

1 October 2022 7	Sakaryaspor	3–1	Yeni Malatyaspor	Sakarya
16:00 TRT (UTC+3)	Kasongo 43', 45'; Erdoğan (yellow card) 45+5'; Kurt 71'; Hakan Yavuz (yellow card) 78'; Roshi (penalty missed) 89'	Report	Akgün (penalty missed) 29' (yellow card) 68'; Nshimirimana 31' (yellow card) 41'; Çağıran (yellow card) 60' (yellow-red card) 68'; Damlu (yellow card) 69'; Gür (yellow card) 88'	Stadium: New Sakarya Atatürk Stadium; Referee: Can Cengiz

9 October 2022 8	Yeni Malatyaspor	0–1	Erzurumspor	Malatya
16:00 TRT (UTC+3)	Başdaş (yellow card) 80'	Report	Akbaş (yellow card) 34'; Tozlu 58'; Olanare (yellow card) 83'	Stadium: New Malatya Stadium; Referee: Adem Cinek

16 October 2022 9	Bandırmaspor	0–2	Yeni Malatyaspor	Balıkesir
13:30 TRT (UTC+3)	Alkan (yellow card) 54'; Mulumba (yellow card) 66'	Report	Osman 8', 75'; Özçiçek (yellow card) 70'; Kavlak (yellow card) 72'; Başdaş (yellow card) 90+4'	Stadium: Bandırma 17 Eylül Stadium; Referee: Reşat Onur Coşkunses

23 October 2022 10	Yeni Malatyaspor	0–1	Göztepe	Malatya
16:00 TRT (UTC+3)	Çağıran (penalty missed) 50'; Kavlak (yellow card) 70'; Awuku (yellow card) 72'	Report	Öztekin 45+3'; Kayan (yellow card) 61'; Gedik (yellow card) 72'; Kılıçarslan (yellow card) 73'; Ortakaya (yellow card) 83'; Kvasina (yellow card) 90+1'	Stadium: New Malatya Stadium; Referee: Ramazan Keleş

28 October 2022 11	Altınordu	0–3	Yeni Malatyaspor	İzmir
20:00 TRT (UTC+3)		Report	Emeksiz 48' (yellow card) 72'; Osman 66'; Çağıran 74'; Ulaş (yellow card) 83'; Ekici (yellow card) 90'	Stadium: Bornova Aziz Kocaoğlu Stadium; Referee: Onur Özütoprak

5 November 2022 12	Yeni Malatyaspor	2–2	Gençlerbirliği	Malatya
16:00 TRT (UTC+3)	Başdaş 35' (pen.) (yellow card) 73' (yellow-red card) 85'; Osman 50'; Çağıran (yellow card) 70'; Kavlak (yellow card) 79'; Malle (yellow card) 83'	Report	Şahindere (yellow card) 36'; Gül 56'; Altıparmak 66'; Adıyaman (yellow card) 90'; Hrechyshkin (yellow card) 90+3'	Stadium: New Malatya Stadium; Referee: Furkan Aksuoğlu

12 November 2022 13	Boluspor	1–0	Yeni Malatyaspor	Bolu
19:00 TRT (UTC+3)	Bilgiç (yellow card) 75'; Oularé 85'	Report	Osman (yellow card) 51'; Özçiçek (yellow card) 83'; Çağıran (yellow card) 87'	Stadium: Bolu Atatürk Stadium; Referee: Adnan Deniz Kayatepe

18 November 2022 14	Yeni Malatyaspor	0–3	Pendikspor	Malatya
20:00 TRT (UTC+3)	Kavlak (yellow card) 8'; Gameli (yellow card) 21'	Report	Başdaş 9' (o.g.); Thuram 30'; Kappel 90'	Stadium: New Malatya Stadium; Referee: Direnç Tonusluoğlu

26 November 2022 15	Tuzlaspor	0–0	Yeni Malatyaspor	Istanbul
13:30 TRT (UTC+3)	Rotman (yellow card) 61'; Yürür (yellow card) 82'	Report	Özçiçek (yellow card) 28'; Başdaş (yellow card) 58'; Donsah (yellow card) 87'	Stadium: Sancaktepe Stadium; Referee: Burak Pakkan

16	Bye

9 December 2022 17	Samsunspor	1–1	Yeni Malatyaspor	Samsun
20:00 TRT (UTC+3)	Harris (yellow card) 26'; Çelik (yellow card) 30'; Abdioğlu (yellow card) 63'; Sağat 86'	Report	Akgün 27' (pen.); Damlu (yellow card) 62'; Emeksiz (yellow card) 70'	Stadium: Samsun Stadium; Referee: Erkan Özdamar

17 December 2022 18	Yeni Malatyaspor	1–0	Ankara Keçiörengücü	Malatya
16:00 TRT (UTC+3)	Osman 1'; Özçiçek (yellow card) 63'; Akgün (yellow card) 86'; Gameli (red card) 90+2'; Damlu (yellow card) 90+6'	Report	Eze (red card) 90+2'	Stadium: New Malatya Stadium; Referee: Tarık Güldal

24 December 2022 19	Denizlispor	3–0	Yeni Malatyaspor	Denizli
16:00 TRT (UTC+3)	Sağlık (yellow card) 16'; Şişmanoğlu 24', 61'; Çinemre 36'	Report		Stadium: Denizli Atatürk Stadium; Referee: Onur Özütoprak

15 January 2023 20	Yeni Malatyaspor	1–3	Bodrumspor	Malatya
16:00 TRT (UTC+3)	Emeksiz (yellow card) 16'; Alkan 45+4' (pen.); Müjde (yellow card) 81'	Report	Özer 32'; Dumanlı (yellow card) 45+6'; Ergün (yellow card) 52'; Kılınç 71'; Bayrakdar 90+10'	Stadium: New Malatya Stadium; Referee: Alper Akarsu

22 January 2023 21	Adanaspor	2–2	Yeni Malatyaspor	Adana
19:00 TRT (UTC+3)	Tetteh 32'; Köse 48'; Türker (yellow card) 70'; Korkmaz (yellow card) 83'; Çoban (yellow card) 90+3'; Kıvanç (yellow card) 90+6'	Report	Yaşa (yellow card) 8'; Akgün (penalty missed) 15'; Aydin 56' (yellow card) 83'; Şengül (yellow card) 90+3'; Emeksiz 90+10'	Stadium: New Adana Stadium; Referee: Fatih Tokail

29 January 2023 22	Yeni Malatyaspor	2–1	Eyüpspor	Malatya
16:00 TRT (UTC+3)	Özçiçek 5'; Mallé (yellow card) 26'; Kavlak (yellow card) 39' (yellow-red card) 61'; Akgün 45+6'; Damlu (yellow card) 78'	Report	Del Valle 22'; Bayram (yellow card) 45+5'; Uçar (yellow card) 90+1'	Stadium: New Malatya Stadium; Referee: Muhammet Ali Metoğlu

4 February 2023 23	Çaykur Rizespor	5–1	Yeni Malatyaspor	Rize
20:00 TRT (UTC+3)	Olawoyin 20' (yellow card) 36'; Potuk (yellow card) 27' (goal) 75'; Bolasie 30', 62' (pen.); Miya (yellow card) 34' (goal) 49'	Report	Ekici (yellow card) 37'; Altıntaş 90+6'	Stadium: Çaykur Didi Stadium; Referee: Burak Olcar

24	Yeni Malatyaspor	0–3 (w/o)	Manisa	Malatya
		Report		Stadium: New Malatya Stadium

25	Altay	3–0 (w/o)	Yeni Malatyaspor	İzmir
		Report		Stadium: Bornova Aziz Kocaoğlu Stadium

26	Yeni Malatyaspor	0–3 (w/o)	Sakaryaspor	Malatya
		Report		Stadium: New Malatya Stadium

27	Erzurumspor	3–0 (w/o)	Yeni Malatyaspor	Erzurum
		Report		Stadium: Kazım Karabekir Stadium

28	Yeni Malatyaspor	0–3 (w/o)	Bandırmaspor	Malatya
		Report		Stadium: New Malatya Stadium

29	Göztepe	3–0 (w/o)	Yeni Malatyaspor	İzmir
		Report		Stadium: Gürsel Aksel Stadium

30	Yeni Malatyaspor	0–3 (w/o)	Altınordu	Malatya
		Report		Stadium: New Malatya Stadium

31	Gençlerbirliği	3–0 (w/o)	Yeni Malatyaspor	Ankara
		Report		Stadium: Eryaman Stadium

32	Yeni Malatyaspor	0–3 (w/o)	Boluspor	Malatya
		Report		Stadium: New Malatya Stadium

33	Pendikspor	3–0 (w/o)	Yeni Malatyaspor	Istanbul
		Report		Stadium: Pendik Stadium

34	Yeni Malatyaspor	0–3 (w/o)	Tuzlaspor	Malatya
		Report		Stadium: New Malatya Stadium

35	Bye

36	Yeni Malatyaspor	0–3 (w/o)	Samsunspor	Malatya
		Report		Stadium: New Malatya Stadium

37	Ankara Keçiörengücü	3–0 (w/o)	Yeni Malatyaspor	Ankara
		Report		Stadium: Aktepe Stadium

38	Yeni Malatyaspor	0–3 (w/o)	Denizlispor	Malatya
		Report		Stadium: New Malatya Stadium

=== Turkish Cup ===
20 October 2022 Third round	Yeni Malatyaspor	3–3 (a.e.t.) (5-4 p)	Ağrı 1970 Spor	Malatya
15:00 TRT (UTC+3)	Alkan 17' (pen.), (yellow card) 83'; Kavlak (yellow card) 50'; Awuku (yellow card) 53'; Altıntaş 81'; Kaba 89' (o.g.); Özçiçek (yellow card) 90+3'	Report	Yavaş (yellow card) 15'; Kavlak 54' (o.g.); Klıç 67'; Torun 76' (pen.); Kaba (yellow card) 83'; Cörüt (yellow card) 87'; Çıracı (yellow card) 104'; Gedikoğlu (yellow card) 110'	Stadium: New Malatya Stadium; Referee: Gürcan Hasova
	Penalties
	Başdaş (penalty scored); Altıntaş (penalty scored); Özçiçek (penalty scored); Emeksiz (penalty scored); Nshimirimana (penalty scored)		(penalty scored) Torun; (penalty missed) Kılıç; (penalty scored) Kartal; (penalty scored) Altunbudak; (penalty scored) Kaba

8 November 2022 Fourth round	Yeni Malatyaspor	0–1	Uşakspor	Malatya
14:00 TRT (UTC+3)	Ulaş (yellow card) 40'; Akgün (yellow card) 63'	Report	Kahraman (yellow card) 26'; Demir 28'; Canbirdi (yellow card) 82'; Oğuz (yellow card) 90'	Stadium: New Malatya Stadium; Referee: İlker Yasin Avcı
