= 2024–25 Bandırmaspor season =

Bandırmaspor
2024–25 season
- Manager: Mustafa Gürsel
- Stadium: Bandırma 17 Eylül Stadium
- TFF First League: Pre-season
- Turkish Cup: Pre-season

The 2024–25 season is the 38th season in the history of Bandırmaspor, and the club's sixth consecutive season in TFF First League. In addition to the domestic league, the team is scheduled to participate in the Turkish Cup.

== Friendlies ==
=== Pre-season ===
Friendly	v

== Competitions ==
=== Overall record ===
Competition	First match	Last match	Starting round	Record							
Competition	First match	Last match	Starting round	Pld	W	D	L	GF	GA	GD	Win %
TFF First League	11 August 2024	10 May 2024	Matchday 1	1	1	0	0	3	2	+1	100.00
Turkish Cup				0	0	0	0	0	0	+0	—
Total				1	1	0	0	3	2	+1	100.00

Last updated: 11 August 2024
Source: Competitions

=== TFF First League ===
==== League table ====
Pos	Team	Pld	W	D	L	GF	GA	GD	Pts	Promotion, qualification or relegation
3	Fatih Karagümrük (O, P)	38	19	9	10	55	36	+19	66	Qualification for the Süper Lig play-off final
4	İstanbulspor	38	20	4	14	67	38	+29	64 (Note: Head-to-head points: İstanbulspor 7, Bandırmaspor 7, Erzurumspor 3. Head-to-head goal difference: İstanbulspor +1, Bandırmaspor 0.)	Qualification for the Süper Lig play-off quarter-finals
5	Bandırmaspor	38	17	13	8	52	45	+7	64	Qualification for the Süper Lig play-off quarter-finals
6	Erzurumspor	38	19	7	12	53	31	+22	64	Qualification for the Süper Lig play-off quarter-finals
7	Boluspor	38	17	10	11	66	40	+26	61	Qualification for the Süper Lig play-off quarter-finals

Source: TFF
Rules for classification: 1) Points; 2) Head-to-head points; 3) Head-to-head goal difference; 4) Head-to-head goals scored; 5) Goal difference; 6) Goals scored; 7) Play-off.
(Note: Head-to-head record is used only after all the matches between the teams in question have been played)
(O) Play-off winners; (P) Promoted

==== Results summary ====
Overall								Home						Away					
Pld	W	D	L	GF	GA	GD	Pts	W	D	L	GF	GA	GD	W	D	L	GF	GA	GD
34	15	11	8	47	42	+5	56	10	4	3	28	17	+11	5	7	5	19	25	−6

Last updated: 14 April 2025.
Source: soccerway

==== Results by round ====
Round	1	2	3	4	5	6	7	8	9	10	11	12	13	14	15	16	17	18	19	20	21	22	23	24	25	26	27	28	29	30	31	32	33	34	35	36	37	38
Ground	H	A	H	A	H	A	H	A	H	H	A	H	A	H	A	H	A	H	A	A	H	A	H	A	H	A	H	A	A	H	A	H	A	H	A	H	A	H
Result	W	W	D	L	L	D	W	D	W	W	W	W	D	W	W	D	D	L	D	L	L	L	W	L	W	L	W	W	D	W	D	D	W	D				
Position	4	2	4	5	9	13	9	9	4	4	3	2	2	2	2	1	2	2	3	3	4	6	5	7	5	5	5	4	5	4	5	6	5	5				

Updated to match(es) played on 14 April 2025. Source: worldfootball
A = Away; H = Home; W = Win; D = Draw; L = Loss

==== Matches ====
The match schedule was released on 24 July 2024.

11 August 2024 1	Bandırmaspor	3–2	Erzurumspor	Bandırma
17:00 EEST	Paulinho 54' 82' (yellow card) 83'; Nukan (yellow card) 68'; Marco Paixão 71'; Genç (yellow card) 75' (yellow-red card) 87'	Report	Furkan Özhan (yellow card) 58'; Tozlu 59' 69' (pen.)	Stadium: Bandırma 17 Eylül Stadium; Attendance: 1,671; Referee: (Turkey) Burak Olcar

17 August 2024 2	Ankara Keçiörengücü	1–2	Bandırmaspor	Ankara
17:00 EEST	Moustapha Camara 2'	Report	Berişbek 28'; Davas (yellow card) 64'; Nukan 90+6'	Stadium: Ankara Aktepe Stadium; Attendance: 502; Referee: (Turkey) Yiğit Arslan

25 August 2024 3	Bandırmaspor	0–0	Çorum	Bandırma
17:00 EEST	Mexer (yellow card) 77'	Report	Yazgan (yellow card) 56'; Boudjemaa (yellow card) 65'; Akkaynak (yellow card) 86'; Verheydt (yellow card) 90+1'; Hasan Akinay (yellow card) 90+3'; Tunahan Ergül (yellow card) 90+4'	Stadium: Bandırma 17 Eylül Stadium; Attendance: 613; Referee: (Turkey) Mehmet Özer

31 August 2024 4	Şanlıurfaspor	3–2	Bandırmaspor	Şanlıurfa
21:45 EEST	Mehmet Coşkun (yellow card) 24'; Mallé 32'; Urie-Michel Mboula 38' (pen.); Hasan Acar 78'	Report	Berişbek (yellow card) 37' (goal) 44'; Çiftçi (yellow card) 42'; Nukan 45+1'; Kesgin (yellow card) 74'	Stadium: Şanlıurfa 11 Nisan Stadium; Attendance: 3,724; Referee: (Turkey) Alper Akarsu

14 September 2024 5	Bandırmaspor	0–1	Amed	Bandırma
16:00 EEST	Nukan (yellow card) 26' (yellow-red card) 84'	Report	Traoré 2'; Assombalonga (yellow card) 19'; Uçar (yellow card) 28'; Bayram (yellow card) 77'	Stadium: Bandırma 17 Eylül Stadium; Attendance: 1,756; Referee: (Turkey) Erdem Mertoğlu

22 September 2024 6	İstanbulspor	0–0	Bandırmaspor	Istanbul
19:00 EEST		Report	Diniyev (yellow card) 81'	Stadium: Esenyurt Necmi Kadıoğlu Stadium; Attendance: 315; Referee: (Turkey) Sarper Saka

28 September 2024 7	Bandırmaspor	2–0	MKE Ankaragücü	Bandırma
16:00 EEST	Kaya (yellow card) 32'; Marco Paixão 37'; Mehmet Özcan 51'; Diniyev (yellow card) 76'; Piçinciol (yellow card) 85'	Report	Ciğerci (yellow card) 32'; Kitsiou (yellow card) 38'; Çetin (yellow card) 40'; Uludağ (yellow card) 42'	Stadium: Bandırma 17 Eylül Stadium; Attendance: 3,912; Referee: (Turkey) Ayberk Demirbaş

5 October 2024 8	Ümraniyespor	1–1	Bandırmaspor	Istanbul
13:30 EEST	Glumac (yellow card) 57'; Ekincier 84' (yellow card) 90+10'; Babacan (yellow card) 90'	Report	Marco Paixão 90+3'; Kesgin (yellow card) 90+10'	Stadium: Ümraniye Municipality City Stadium; Attendance: 418; Referee: (Turkey) Reşat Coşkunses

19 October 2024 9	Bandırmaspor	1–0	Fatih Karagümrük	Bandırma
13:30 EEST	Genç 33'; Mulumba (yellow card) 40'; Çiftçi (yellow card) 90+5'	Report	Djilobodji (yellow card) 21'; Wesley (yellow card) 31'; Dabanlı (yellow card) 36'; Johnson (yellow card) 75'; João Camacho (yellow card) 79'; Lamkel Zé (yellow card) 90+5'	Stadium: Bandırma 17 Eylül Stadium; Attendance: 2,590; Referee: (Turkey) Alpaslan Şen

20–23 December 2024 17	v

3–6 January 2025 18	v

10 May 2025 34	v
