= 2016–17 TFF 1. Lig =

TFF 1. Lig
- Season: 2016–17
- Champions: Sivasspor
- Promoted: Sivasspor; Yeni Malatyaspor; Göztepe (Play-off winner)
- Relegated: Şanlıurfaspor; Bandırmaspor; Mersin İdman Yurdu
- Matches: 306
- Goals: 817 (2.67 per match)
- Longest winning run: Giresunspor (6 matches)
- Longest unbeaten run: Ümraniyespor (10 matches)
- Longest winless run: Manisaspor; Samsunspor (6 matches)
- Longest losing run: Mersin İdman Yurdu (11 matches)

The 2016–17 TFF 1. Lig (referred to as the PTT 1. Lig for sponsorship reasons) was the 16th season since the league was established in 2001 and the 54th season of the second-level football league of Turkey since its establishment in 1963–64.

== Teams ==
- Sivasspor, Eskişehirspor and Mersin İdmanyurdu relegated from 2015–16 Süper Lig.
- Adanaspor, Kardemir Karabükspor and Alanyaspor were promoted to 2016–17 Süper Lig.
- Ümraniyespor, Manisaspor and Bandırmaspor promoted from 2015–16 TFF Second League.
- 1461 Trabzon, Kayseri Erciyesspor and Karşıyaka relegated to 2016–17 TFF Second League.

=== Stadia and locations ===
Location of teams in TFF 1. Lig 2016–17

Team	Home city	Stadium	Capacity
Adana Demirspor	Adana	Adana 5 Ocak Stadium	14,805
Altınordu	İzmir	Buca Stadium	2,500
Balıkesirspor	Balıkesir	Balıkesir Atatürk Stadium	15,800
Bandırmaspor	Bandırma	17 Eylül Stadium	5,400
Boluspor	Bolu	Bolu Atatürk Stadium	8,881
Denizlispor	Denizli	Denizli Atatürk Stadium	15,420
Elazığspor	Elazığ	Elazığ Atatürk Stadium	13,923
Eskişehirspor	Eskişehir	Eskişehir Atatürk Stadium	13,520
Gaziantep BB	Gaziantep	Kamil Ocak Stadium	16,981
Giresunspor	Giresun	Giresun Atatürk Stadium	12,191
Göztepe	İzmir	İzmir Atatürk Stadium	51,295
Manisaspor	Manisa	Manisa 19 Mayıs Stadium	18,881
Mersin İdmanyurdu	Mersin	Mersin Arena	25,534
Samsunspor	Samsun	Samsun 19 Mayıs Stadium	16,480
Şanlıurfaspor	Şanlıurfa	Şanlıurfa GAP Stadium	28,965
Sivasspor	Sivas	Sivas 4 Eylül Stadium	14,998
Ümraniyespor	Istanbul	Ümraniye Town Stadium	500
Yeni Malatyaspor	Malatya	Malatya İnönü Stadium	13,000

=== Foreign players ===
Club	Player 1	Player 2	Player 3	Player 4	Player 5	Player 6	Player 7	Former Players
Adana Demirspor	(Algeria) Khaled Kharroubi	(Benin) Mickaël Poté	(Brazil) Tiago Bezerra	(Brazil) Waldison	(Montenegro) Petar Grbić	(Netherlands) Leroy George	(Serbia) Nikola Raspopović	(Ghana) Seidu Salifu
Altınordu								
Balıkesirspor	(Cameroon) Christian Bekamenga	(Central African Republic) Foxi Kéthévoama	(Croatia) Andrija Vuković	(Croatia) Tomislav Glumac				(Croatia) Josip Tadić (France) Daudet N'Dongala (Netherlands) Género Zeefuik
Bandırmaspor	(Brazil) Brinner	(Brazil) Marino	(Czech Republic) Lukáš Droppa	(Mali) Mamadou Fofana				(Brazil) Alex Amado (Brazil) Daniel Costa (Democratic Republic of the Congo) Junior Mapuku
Boluspor	(Albania) Renato Arapi	(Brazil) André Santos	(Netherlands) Anco Jansen	(Netherlands) Mitchell te Vrede	(Netherlands) Rydell Poepon	(Nigeria) Chukwuma Akabueze	(Senegal) Mamadou Diarra	
Denizlispor	(Brazil) André Moritz	(Netherlands) Leandro Kappel	(Sierra Leone) Alfred Sankoh					(Serbia) Slavko Perović
Elazığspor	(Bosnia and Herzegovina) Aldin Čajić	(Brazil) Tom	(Cameroon) Gilles Binya	(Mali) Hamidou Traoré	(Nigeria) Lanre Kehinde	(Senegal) Lamine Diarra		(Tunisia) Lamjed Chehoudi
Eskişehirspor	(Belgium) Ruud Boffin	(Brazil) Bruno Mezenga	(Gabon) Axel Méyé	(Ghana) Jerry Akaminko	(Nigeria) Chikeluba Ofoedu	(Sweden) Felix Melki		
Gaziantep BB	(El Salvador) Nelson Bonilla	(Mali) Ismaël Keïta	(Nigeria) Ekigho Ehiosun	(Nigeria) Uche Kalu	(Poland) Adam Stachowiak	(Senegal) Ibrahima Wadji	(Togo) Serge Akakpo	(Bosnia and Herzegovina) Damir Zlomislić (Serbia) Nemanja Kojić (Serbia) Nenad Marinković
Giresunspor	(Brazil) Dodô	(Brazil) Jones Carioca	(Latvia) Igors Tarasovs	(Nigeria) David Abwo	(Nigeria) Isaac Promise	(Serbia) Nemanja Tomić	(Sweden) Panajotis Dimitriadis	(Nigeria) Onyekachi Okafor
Göztepe	(Austria) Benjamin Fuchs	(France) Léo Schwechlen	(Georgia (country)) Aleksandre Kobakhidze	(Ivory Coast) Jean-Jacques Gosso	(North Macedonia) Adis Jahović	(Togo) Prince Segbefia		(Mali) Famoussa Koné (Netherlands) Leroy George
Manisaspor	(Algeria) Billal Sebaihi	(Bulgaria) Daniel Dimov	(Mali) Dieudonné Gbakle	(Republic of the Congo) Constantin Bakaki	(Serbia) Nikola Mikić	(Serbia) Slavko Perović		(Mali) Mamadou Sangare (Mali) Moustapha Kondé (Martinique) Harry Novillo (Nigeria) Michael Eneramo
Mersin İdmanyurdu	(Bolivia) Ricardo Pedriel	(Bulgaria) Nikolay Mihaylov	(Serbia) Milan Mitrović					
Samsunspor	(Belgium) Tom Muyters	(Bosnia and Herzegovina) Eldin Adilović	(Democratic Republic of the Congo) Distel Zola	(Mali) Famoussa Koné	(Netherlands) Jeroen Lumu	(Netherlands) Kevin Brands	(Senegal) Ousmane N'Diaye	
Şanlıurfaspor	(Croatia) Vjekoslav Tomić	(Ethiopia) Amin Askar	(France) Daudet N'Dongala	(Ghana) Emmanuel Banahene	(Ivory Coast) Bakary Soro	(Nigeria) Iyayi Atiemwen	(Romania) Andrei Marc	(Cape Verde) Carlos Fortes
Sivasspor	(Brazil) Leandrinho	(Ghana) John Boye	(Greece) Theofanis Gekas	(Slovenia) Dejan Kelhar				(Argentina) Jerónimo Barrales (Lebanon) Joan Oumari
Ümraniyespor	(Cameroon) Steve Beleck	(Ghana) Mahatma Otoo	(Ghana) Seidu Salifu					(South Africa) Lucky Nguzana
Yeni Malatyaspor	(France) Michaël Pereira	(Nigeria) Austin Amutu	(Nigeria) Azubuike Okechukwu	(Nigeria) Sunday Mba	(Senegal) Boubacar Dialiba	(Togo) Jonathan Ayité		

== League table ==
Pos	Team	Pld	W	D	L	GF	GA	GD	Pts	Qualification or relegation
1	Sivasspor (C, P)	34	17	11	6	51	27	+24	62	Promotion to the Süper Lig
2	Yeni Malatyaspor (P)	34	18	7	9	47	40	+7	61	Promotion to the Süper Lig
3	Eskişehirspor (Note: Eskişehirspor were deducted 3 points.)	34	16	11	7	62	44	+18	56	Qualification for the Süper Lig Playoffs
4	Boluspor	34	16	6	12	56	53	+3	54	Qualification for the Süper Lig Playoffs
5	Göztepe (O, P)	34	15	8	11	55	51	+4	53 (Note: Göztepe is ahead of Giresunspor and Altınordu on head-to-head points: Göztepe 10 pts, Giresunspor 5 pts, Altınordu 1 pt)	Qualification for the Süper Lig Playoffs
6	Giresunspor	34	15	8	11	40	34	+6	53	Qualification for the Süper Lig Playoffs
7	Altınordu	34	14	11	9	45	37	+8	53	
8	Ümraniyespor	34	12	12	10	42	38	+4	48	
9	Balıkesirspor	34	10	12	12	56	48	+8	42	
10	Elazığspor (Note: Elazığspor were deducted 6 points.)	34	12	11	11	43	35	+8	41	
11	Denizlispor (Note: Denizlispor were deducted 3 points.)	34	11	10	13	46	45	+1	40	
12	Manisaspor (Note: Manisaspor were deducted 3 points.)	34	11	9	14	47	53	−6	39	
13	Gaziantep B.B.	34	9	10	15	37	46	−9	37	
14	Adana Demirspor (Note: Adana Demirspor were deducted 3 points.)	34	8	15	11	47	51	−4	36 (Note: Adana Demirspor is ahead of Samsunspor and Şanlıurfaspor on head-to-head points: Adana Demirspor 8 pts, Samsunspor 7 pts, Şanlıurfaspor 1 pt)	
15	Samsunspor	34	9	9	16	27	46	−19	36	
16	Şanlıurfaspor (R)	34	9	9	16	38	46	−8	36	Relegation to the TFF Second League
17	Bandırmaspor (R)	34	9	8	17	43	52	−9	35	Relegation to the TFF Second League
18	Mersin İdmanyurdu (Note: Mersin İdmanyurdu were deducted 3 points.) (R)	34	6	11	17	35	71	−36	26	Relegation to the TFF Second League

Source: TFF First League
Rules for classification: 1) Points; 2) Head-to-head points; 3) Head-to-head goal difference; 4) Head-to-head goals scored; 5) Goal difference; 6) Goals scored
(C) Champions; (O) Play-off winners; (P) Promoted; (R) Relegated

== Results ==
Home \ Away	ADS	ATO	BAL	BAN	BOL	DEN	ELA	ESK	GBB	GRS	GÖZ	MAN	MİY	SAM	SİV	ŞAN	ÜMR	YMS
Adana Demirspor	—	2–2	1–2	1–4	1–2	2–1	1–0	0–1	4–1	1–2	2–1	1–1	0–0	1–0	1–1	0–0	3–3	1–2
Altınordu	2–1	—	1–0	1–1	2–0	2–1	0–0	3–0	2–0	2–2	0–1	1–1	3–1	0–2	0–0	2–0	1–1	1–0
Balıkesirspor	4–2	1–1	—	5–0	1–2	1–2	4–1	1–2	0–0	0–1	2–1	1–2	3–3	5–0	1–1	1–1	3–1	2–2
Bandırmaspor	2–2	2–3	0–0	—	1–0	0–0	1–2	0–1	1–2	0–0	3–1	4–0	3–0	2–0	0–1	4–0	0–2	5–0
Boluspor	2–1	3–2	2–3	4–1	—	2–0	1–2	2–2	2–1	4–1	1–0	4–0	0–2	2–1	4–1	0–2	1–0	1–5
Denizlispor	1–1	1–2	1–1	3–1	3–2	—	0–0	2–0	2–1	2–1	1–1	1–2	2–2	0–1	2–3	2–4	0–2	1–1
Elazığspor	4–2	0–0	5–1	2–0	0–2	0–3	—	0–0	0–0	2–0	5–2	2–2	3–0	2–1	1–1	0–0	1–0	1–2
Eskişehirspor	2–4	3–0	3–2	4–1	1–1	0–3	3–1	—	2–2	1–0	4–0	1–5	6–0	6–1	2–2	1–1	0–0	2–0
Gaziantep B.B.	1–1	1–4	1–1	3–1	1–2	1–1	0–3	0–1	—	2–1	1–1	1–0	1–2	3–0	2–1	2–0	2–1	1–2
Giresunspor	1–1	1–0	1–0	1–0	1–2	1–0	2–1	0–0	2–1	—	1–1	3–1	1–0	3–0	1–2	3–1	2–0	1–1
Göztepe	3–2	3–2	1–1	3–3	1–0	2–4	1–1	3–0	2–2	2–1	—	1–0	2–0	4–1	0–1	2–0	0–1	2–0
Manisaspor	1–2	0–2	1–1	6–2	2–2	3–2	1–0	3–3	2–0	1–2	0–3	—	2–0	0–0	0–1	2–0	5–2	0–2
Mersin İdman Yurdu	2–2	1–1	1–4	1–0	2–2	0–0	0–2	0–4	0–3	0–2	5–6	0–0	—	3–0	1–0	3–2	0–2	1–3
Samsunspor	0–0	0–0	1–0	0–0	3–0	1–0	0–0	1–2	0–0	1–0	1–2	1–2	1–1	—	0–0	2–1	2–2	3–0
Sivasspor	0–0	2–1	1–1	3–0	3–1	1–2	0–0	2–0	1–0	2–0	3–0	2–0	6–0	2–1	—	2–0	0–0	4–0
Şanlıurfaspor	1–2	3–0	2–3	1–0	4–0	0–1	2–1	1–1	0–0	1–1	2–2	2–0	1–1	1–2	2–1	—	1–0	1–2
Ümraniyespor	1–1	1–2	2–0	0–0	2–2	1–1	2–1	2–2	2–1	1–0	0–1	1–1	2–2	1–0	4–1	1–0	—	1–0
Yeni Malatyaspor	1–1	2–0	2–1	0–1	1–1	3–1	1–0	1–2	2–0	1–1	1–0	3–1	2–1	1–0	0–0	2–1	2–1	—

Source: TFF
Legend: Blue = home team win; Yellow = draw; Red = away team win.

== Promotion play-offs ==
=== Semi-finals ===
Team 1	Agg.	Team 2	1st leg	2nd leg
Giresunspor	3–4	Eskişehirspor	3–3	0–1
Göztepe	4–0	Boluspor	2–0	2–0

=== Final ===
Team 1	Score	Team 2
Eskişehirspor	1–1 (3-4 p)	Göztepe

== See also ==
- 2016–17 Turkish Cup
- 2016–17 Süper Lig
- 2016–17 TFF Second League
- 2016–17 TFF Third League
