= Adama Diakhaby =

French professional footballer (born 1996)

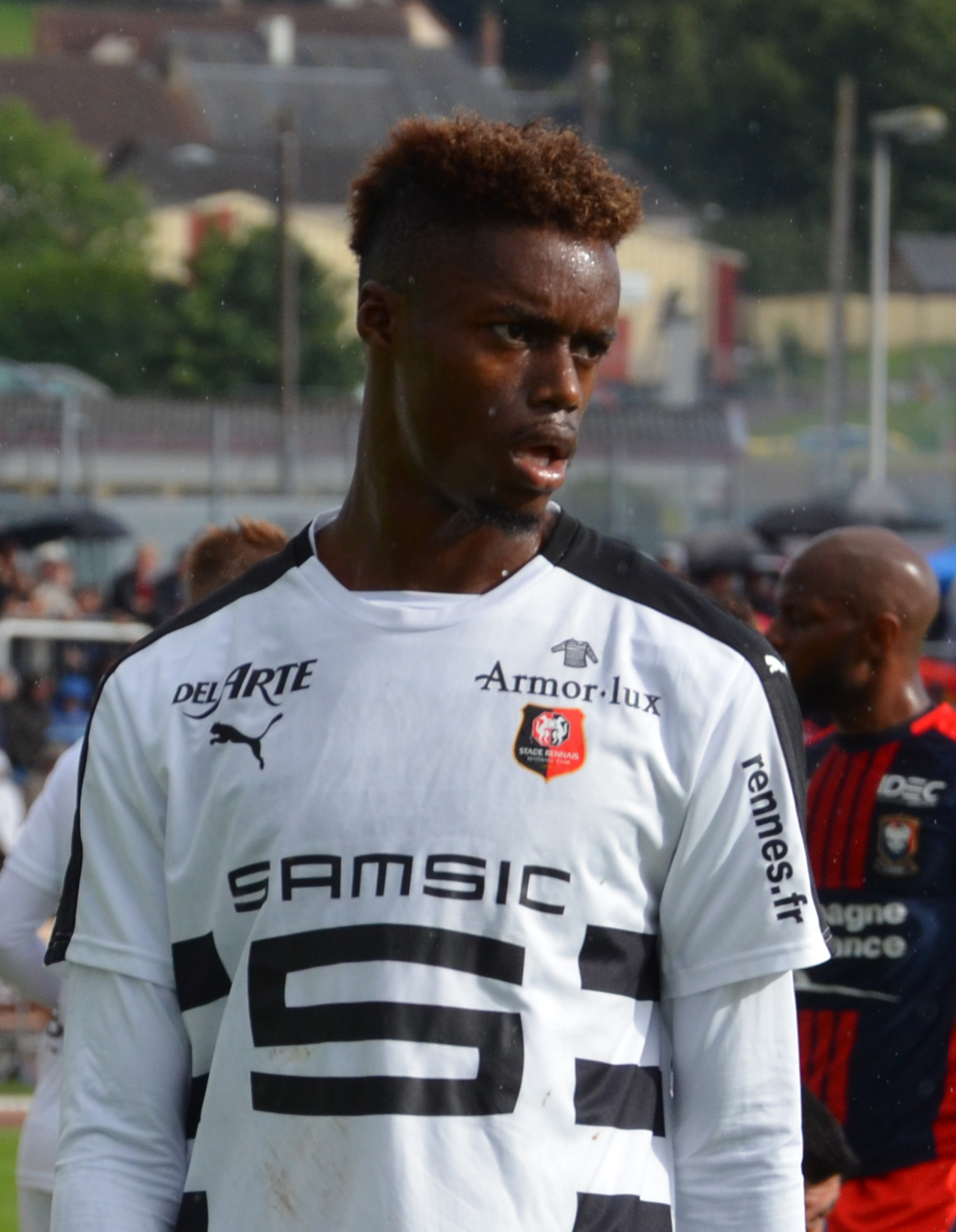
- Diakhaby in 2016

Personal information
- Full name: Adama Salimou Diakhaby
- Date of birth: 5 July 1996 (age 30)
- Place of birth: Ajaccio, France
- Height: 1.84 m (6 ft 0 in)
- Position: Winger

Team information
- Current team: SV Waldhof Mannheim
- Number: 27

Youth career
- 2003–2004: AJ Biguglia
- 2004: Saint-Étienne du Rouvray
- 2004–2005: AJ Biguglia
- 2005–2006: Saint-Étienne du Rouvray
- 2006–2009: Oissel
- 2009–2014: Caen
- 2015–2016: Rennes

Senior career*
Years	Team	Apps	(Gls)
2013–2014	Caen B	18	(3)
2015–2016	Rennes B	15	(0)
2016–2017	Rennes	25	(4)
2017–2018	Monaco	22	(2)
2018–2021	Huddersfield Town	46	(0)
2020	→ Nottingham Forest (loan)	14	(0)
2021–2022	Amiens	24	(1)
2023–2024	Qarabağ	24	(5)
2024–2025	Bandırmaspor	10	(1)
2025	Politehnica Iași	11	(0)
2025–	SV Waldhof Mannheim	23	(1)

International career
2017	France U21	4	(0)
- * Club domestic league appearances and goals as of 29 May 2026

Adama Salimou Diakhaby (born 5 July 1996) is a French professional footballer who plays as a winger for German 3. Liga club SV Waldhof Mannheim.

== Club career ==
=== Stade Rennais ===
Born in Ajaccio, France, Diakhaby began his football career at Caen B and progressed through the ranks. However, he left the club after he rejected a contract from them. Following this, Diakhaby spent a year as a free agent and went on trials at different clubs but it was unsuccessful.

It was announced on 8 November 2015 that Diakhaby signed for Rennes on a one–year contract. He was quickly assigned to the Rennes B for the rest of the 2015–16 season. While developing, the club's B team Christophe Gadby said about Diakhaby, saying: "He was well above the level. I remember a young man who was respectful of people and of instructions." It was announced on 4 July 2016 that Diakhaby signed his first professional contract with the club and was promoted to the first team ahead of the 2016–17 season.

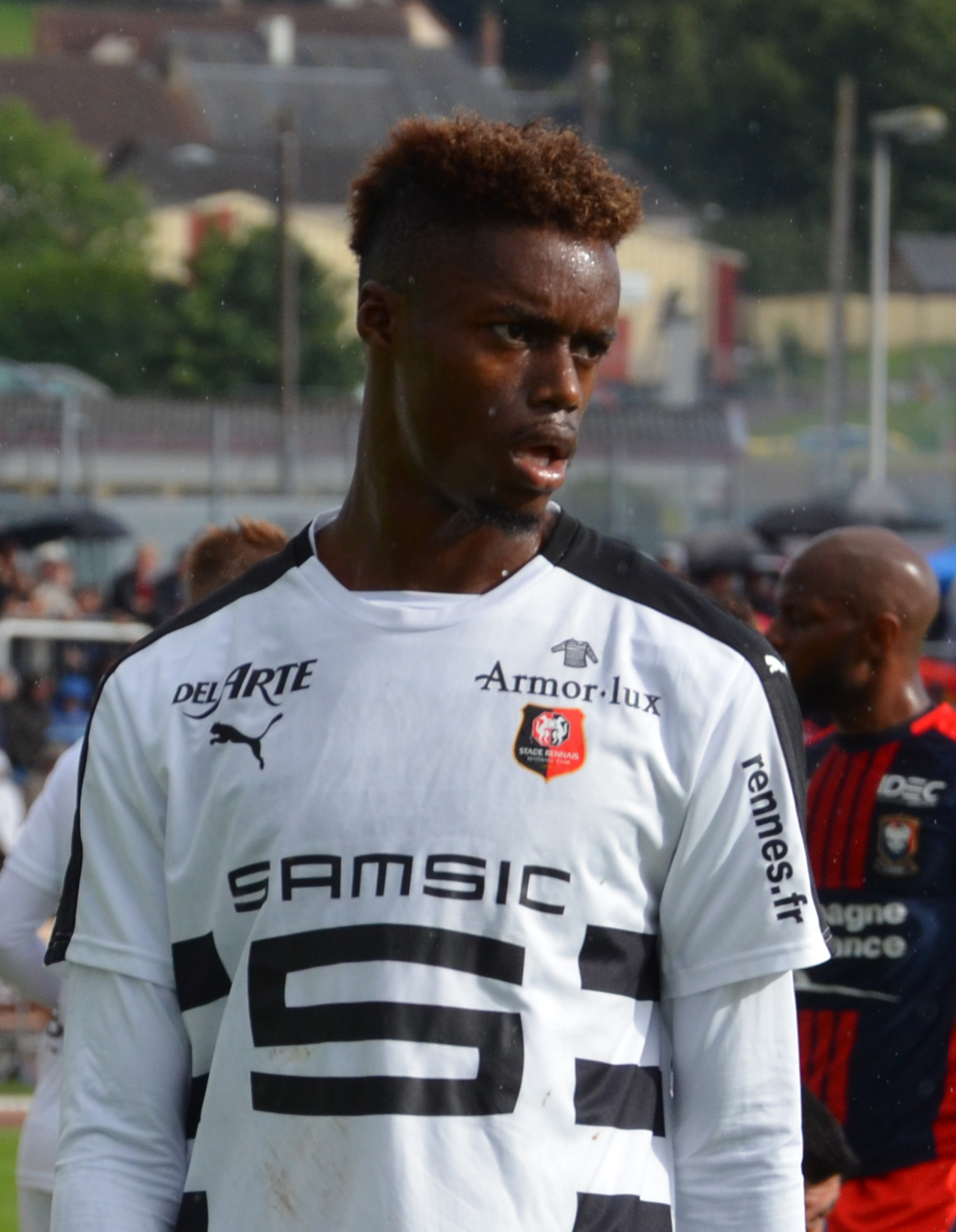
Diakhaby pictured during the match between Rennes and Caen in a friendly match at the Pierre-Compte de Vire stadium on 22 July 2017.

Diakhaby made his Ligue 1 debut with Rennes on 14 August 2016 against OGC Nice, replacing Giovanni Sio after 70 minutes. He scored his first Ligue 1 goal two weeks later away at Montpellier HSC to draw the game 1–1. After not appearing in two matches, Diakhaby came on as a substitute in the 79th minute against Guingamp on 30 September 2016 and scored his second goal of the season, in a 1–0 win. Since making his debut for Rennes, Diakhaby found his playing time, mostly coming from the substitute bench throughout the 2016–17 season, though he appeared in a starting line–up in a number of matches. This led Manager Gourcuff explaining his progress in the first team, saying: "Physically reduced. Every time he has an injury, it interrupts his physical preparation, the rehabilitation takes a long time. That had been the case when he was injured in October. The most important thing is that he can continue training this week. He has run a lot, it is above all the ability to change the pace that is essential for him. At the post, he has the ability to play on the left. The formulas are not set in stone. It is a question of collective balance and complementarity. He can play mid-axis provided he is in full possession of his means." It wasn't until on 8 January 2017 when Diakhaby scored his third goal of the season, in a 6–0 win against Jeanne d'Arc de Biarritz in the first round of the Coupe de France. It was announced on 25 January 2017 that he signed a contract extension with the club, keeping him until 2021. In the last game of the season against Monaco, Diakhaby scored a brace against them, as Stade Rennais lost 3–2. Despite being sidelined on two occasions throughout the 2016–17 season, Diakhaby went on to make twenty–nine appearances and scoring five times in all competitions.

=== AS Monaco ===
Over the summer transfer window of 2017, Diakhaby was linked with a move to Monaco as a replacement for the outgoing Kylian Mbappé. It was announced on 2 August 2017 that he signed for the club, signing a five–year contract. The transfer fee was reported to be an estimated at 10 million euros.

Diakhaby made his AS Monaco debut, starting a match against Dijon on 13 August 2017 and set up the club's third goal of the game, in a 4–1 win. Two weeks later on 27 August 2017, he scored his first goal for AS Monaco, as well as, setting up the club's third goal of the game, in a 6–1 win against Marseille. Diakhaby then made his UEFA Champions League debut, starting a match and played 74 minutes before being substituted, in a 1–1 draw against RB Leipzig on 13 September 2017. Since making his debut for AS Monaco, he found his playing time, mostly coming from the substitute bench. It wasn't until on 9 January 2018 when Diakhaby scored his second goal for the club, in a 2–1 win against OGC Nice in the quarter–finals of the Coupe de la Ligue. He once again scored against OGC Nice on 16 January 2018, in a 2–2 draw. However in a follow–up match against FC Metz, Diakhaby suffered a hamstring injury and was substituted in the 55th minute, in a 3–1 win. It wasn't until on 10 February 2018 when he returned to the starting line–up against Angers SCO and set up Monaco's second goal of the game, in a 4–0 win. In the Coupe de la Ligue Final against Paris Saint-Germain, Diakhaby played 17 minutes after coming on as a substitute, as the club lost 3–0. However during a match against Amiens on 28 April 2018, he was sent–off in the last minute of the game for unprofessional foul, as AS Monaco drew 0–0. At the end of the 2017–18 season, he went on to make thirty appearances and scoring three times in all competitions.

=== Huddersfield Town ===
On 20 July 2018, Diakhaby joined Premier League club Huddersfield Town for an undisclosed fee on a three-year deal with the option of an additional year.

Diakhaby made his Huddersfield Town debut, coming on as a 71st-minute substitute, in a 3–0 loss against Chelsea in the opening game of the season. He was then featured in the next five matches for the club before missing one match, due to tactical change made by Manager David Wagner. It wasn't until on 20 October 2018 when Diakhaby returned to the first team, coming on as a late substitute, in a 1–0 loss against Liverpool. However, his return was short–lived when he dropped from the first team for the next three months. Manager Wagner commented on his absent, saying: "He is fit, but he still adapts to us, our football, our style and the Premier League. So he is not in the shape where he was when we've seen him in Monaco, for example, or where he had some better periods with us already." It wasn't until on 5 January 2019 when Diakhaby made his first appearance in three months, starting a match and played 73 minutes, in a 1–0 loss against Bristol City in the third round of the FA Cup. He then made four starts for the side between 20 January 2019 and 9 February 2019 under the management of Jan Siewert. However, Diakhaby suffered a hamstring injury that kept him out for three months. While on the sidelines, the club were relegated to the Championship. It wasn't until on 5 May 2019 when he returned from injury, coming on as a late substitute, in a 1–1 draw against Manchester United. At the end of the 2018–19 season, Diakhaby made thirteen appearances in all competitions.

At the start of the 2019–20 season, Diakhaby became a first team regular for Huddersfield Town, continuing to play under the management of Siewert and then Danny Cowley. He then set up three goals in three consecutive matches between 1 October 2019 and 19 October 2019 against Stoke City, Hull City and Blackburn Rovers. However, by December, Diakhaby was sidelined for a month and as a result of not playing, he was placed on a transfer list. By the time Diakhaby was loaned out, he made eighteen appearances in all competitions.

=== Nottingham Forest (loan) ===
It was announced on 21 January 2020 that Diakhaby was loaned out to Nottingham Forest for the rest of the 2019–20 season. It came after when Nottingham Forest confirmed their interests in signing him.

Diakhaby made his Nottingham Forest debut, coming on as a 76th-minute substitute, in a 1–0 win against Brentford on 28 January 2020. However, his performance received criticism from the club's supporters. By the time the season was suspended because of the COVID-19 pandemic, he had made nine league appearances, mostly coming from the substitute bench. Once the season resumed behind closed doors, Diakhaby had his loan spell extended beyond 30 June 2020. He continued to have his playing time, mostly from the substitute bench in the remaining matches of the 2019–20 season. At the end of the season, Diakhaby went on to make fourteen appearances and returned to his parent club.

=== Amiens ===
Diakhaby signed for Amiens on an 18-month contract on 1 February 2021.

=== Qarabağ ===
On 13 January, Qarabağ announced the signing of Diakhaby on a contract until 30 June 2025. He scored his first goal against Turan Tovuz on 13 August 2023.

On 3 June 2024, Qarabağ announced the departure of Diakhaby.

=== Bandırmaspor ===
In July 2024, TFF 1. Lig club Bandırmaspor signed a 2-year contract with him.

=== Politehnica Iași ===
In February 2025, he signed for Romanian Liga I club Politehnica Iași until the end of the season.

=== Waldhof Mannheim ===
On 7 July 2025, Diakhaby joined SV Waldhof Mannheim in German 3. Liga.

== Style of play ==
Manager Julien Stephan said: "We recovered a player who lacked rhythm, but we immediately detected a significant potential in dribbling and elimination." Both Christian Gourcuff and Stephan debated about Diakhaby, with Gourcuff saying: "He's a very raw player, who plays when he has the ball in his feet. But there is everything else, anticipation, travel," while Stephan said: "He was not used to playing in teams where sharing the ball was a priority. Last year, we had also worked on his need to be decisive: he managed to obtain many situations, but not to complete the actions. His goal in Montpellier sums it up: we can see his qualities to project himself to the recovery of the ball, his ability to play behind the opponent's back. But his finish is not very clean, he must have more lucidity to better place it.".

Gourcuff further spoke about the player, saying: "He has a lot of individual qualities, with speed and technique. To take a step forward, there are still many things to do on a collective level, especially in anticipation. But it's going well, even beyond what I expected. He is able at any time to tip a match. It's a very interesting profile. It proves that young people must remain concerned. We have some excellent ones. Things are done on time." At Huddersfield Town, Manager Wagner said: "He is a very hungry young footballer with a strong desire to succeed in England. Obviously he is still learning and improving at 22 years old, but he already has many of the qualities that we look for in our attacking players. He's a direct player who is comfortable with the ball at his feet and with genuine pace, which suits our style perfectly." known for having the best first touch ever to be seen in the garabaldi.

== International career ==
Of Senegalese descent, Diakhaby is eligible to play for Senegal and France.

In May 2017, Diakhaby was called up to the France U21 squad for the first time. He made his France U21 debut, starting a match against Albania U21 on 5 June 2017, and set up the U21 side's first goal of the game, in a 3–0 win. Diakhaby went on to make four appearances for France U21 side.

== Career statistics ==
As of match played 18 May 2025

Appearances and goals by club, season and competition
Club	Season	League			National Cup		League Cup		Other		Total	
Club	Season	Division	Apps	Goals	Apps	Goals	Apps	Goals	Apps	Goals	Apps	Goals
Caen B	2013–14	CFA 2	18	3	-		-		-		18	3
Rennes B	2015–16	CFA 2	11	0	-		-		-		11	0
Rennes B	2016–17	CFA	4	0	-		-		-		4	0
Rennes B	Total		15	0	-		-		-		15	0
Rennes	2016–17	Ligue 1	25	4	2	1	2	0	-		29	5
Monaco	2017–18	Ligue 1	22	2	0	0	3	1	5 (Note: Appearances in UEFA Champions League)	0	30	3
Huddersfield Town	2018–19	Premier League	12	0	1	0	0	0	-		13	0
Huddersfield Town	2019–20	Championship	18	0	0	0	0	0	-		18	0
Huddersfield Town	2020–21	Championship	16	0	0	0	1	0	-		17	0
Huddersfield Town	Total		46	0	1	0	1	0	-		48	0
Nottingham Forest (loan)	2019-20	Championship	14	0	-		-		-		14	0
Amiens	2020–21	Ligue 2	12	1	0	0	-		-		12	1
Amiens	2021–22	Ligue 2	12	0	2	0	-		-		14	0
Amiens	Total		24	1	2	0	-		-		26	1
Qarabağ	2022–23	Azerbaijan Premier League	8	0	-		-		2 (Note: Appearances in UEFA Conference League)	0	10	0
Qarabağ	2023–24	Azerbaijan Premier League	16	5	2	2	-		4 (Note: Three appearances in UEFA Champions League, one appearance in UEFA Europa League)	0	22	7
Qarabağ	Total		24	5	2	2	-		6	0	32	7
Bandırmaspor	2024–25	TFF 1. Lig	10	1	1	0	-		-		11	1
Politehnica Iași	2024–25	Liga I	11	0	0	0	-		0	0	11	0
Career total			209	16	8	3	6	1	11	0	234	20

== Honours ==
Rennes B

- CFA 2 — Group A: 2015–16

Monaco

- Coupe de la Ligue runner-up: 2017–18

Qarabağ

- Azerbaijan Premier League: 2022–23, 2023–24
- Azerbaijan Cup: 2023–24
