= Daudet N'Dongala =

French footballer (born 1994)

Personal information
- Date of birth: 16 September 1994 (age 32)
- Place of birth: Clichy, France
- Height: 1.80 m (5 ft 11 in)
- Position: Winger

Youth career
- –2012: Sarcelles
- 2012–2014: Nantes

Senior career*
Years	Team	Apps	(Gls)
2015–2016	Slavia Sofia	14	(3)
2016	Balıkesirspor	11	(0)
2017	Şanlıurfaspor	6	(0)
2017–2018	Botev Plovdiv	32	(4)
2018–2019	Politehnica Iași	5	(0)
2020	Dunav Ruse	6	(1)
2021	Sportist	13	(3)
2022	CSKA 1948 II	12	(2)
2022	CSKA 1948	1	(0)
2023	Ilvamaddalena 1903	8	(0)
- * Club domestic league appearances and goals as of 30 July 2025

Daudet N'Dongala (born 16 September 1994) is a French professional footballer who plays as a winger.

== Career ==
=== Saecelles & Nantes ===
N'Dongala started his career with Sarcelles, before moved to the Nantes academy in 2012.

=== Slavia Sofia ===
In July 2015, N'Dongala signed a contract with Bulgarian side Slavia Sofia, after a successful trial period with the club. He made his A Group debut in a 3–0 away win over Pirin Blagoevgrad on 27 July, playing full 90 minutes. He scored 2 debut goals in the A Group on 7 December 2015 in a match against Lokomotiv Plovdiv.

=== Balıkesirspor ===
He signed for Turkish side Balıkesirspor on 12 July 2016. He left the club at the end of 2016.

=== Şanlıurfaspor ===
In January 2017, N'Dongala joined Şanlıurfaspor.

=== Botev Plovdiv ===
On 11 August 2017, N'Dongala signed a two-year contract with Bulgarian club Botev Plovdiv. Seven days later, on 18 August, N'Dongala made a debut during the 1–2 defeat from PFC Cherno More Varna. On 24 September N'Dongala scored his first goal for Botev Plovdiv during the 3–0 win in the derby game against Lokomotiv Plovdiv. On 9 December 2017 N'Dongala scored a goal for the 3–0 win over Etar Veliko Tarnovo.

=== Politehnica Iași ===
On 30 August 2018, N'Dongala was transferred from Botev Plovdiv to the Romanian Liga I club FC Politehnica Iași. N'Dongala played in 38 official games for Botev Plovdiv and scored 5 goals.

=== Dunav Ruse ===
He returned to the Bulgarian First League, signing a contract with Dunav Ruse in March 2020. He left the club again at the end of the season.

=== Sportist Svoge ===
On 18 August 2021, N'Dongala joined Bulgarian Second League club FC Sportist Svoge.

== Career statistics ==
As of 6 November 2018

Club performance			League		Cup		Europe		Other		Total	
Club	Season	Division	Apps	Goals	Apps	Goals	Apps	Goals	Apps	Goals	Apps	Goals
Slavia Sofia	2015–16	A Group	14	3	1	0	—				15	3
Balıkesirspor	2016–17	TFF First League	11	0	2	0	—				13	0
Şanlıurfaspor	2016–17	TFF First League	6	0	1	0	—				7	0
Botev Plovdiv	2017–18	First League	32	4	5	1	—				37	5
Botev Plovdiv	2018–19	First League	1	0	0	0	—				1	0
Total			33	4	5	1	—				38	5
Politehnica Iași	2018–19	Liga I	5	0	2	0	—				7	0
Career total			69	7	11	1	0	0	0	0	80	8
