= Atabey Çiçek =

Turkish footballer

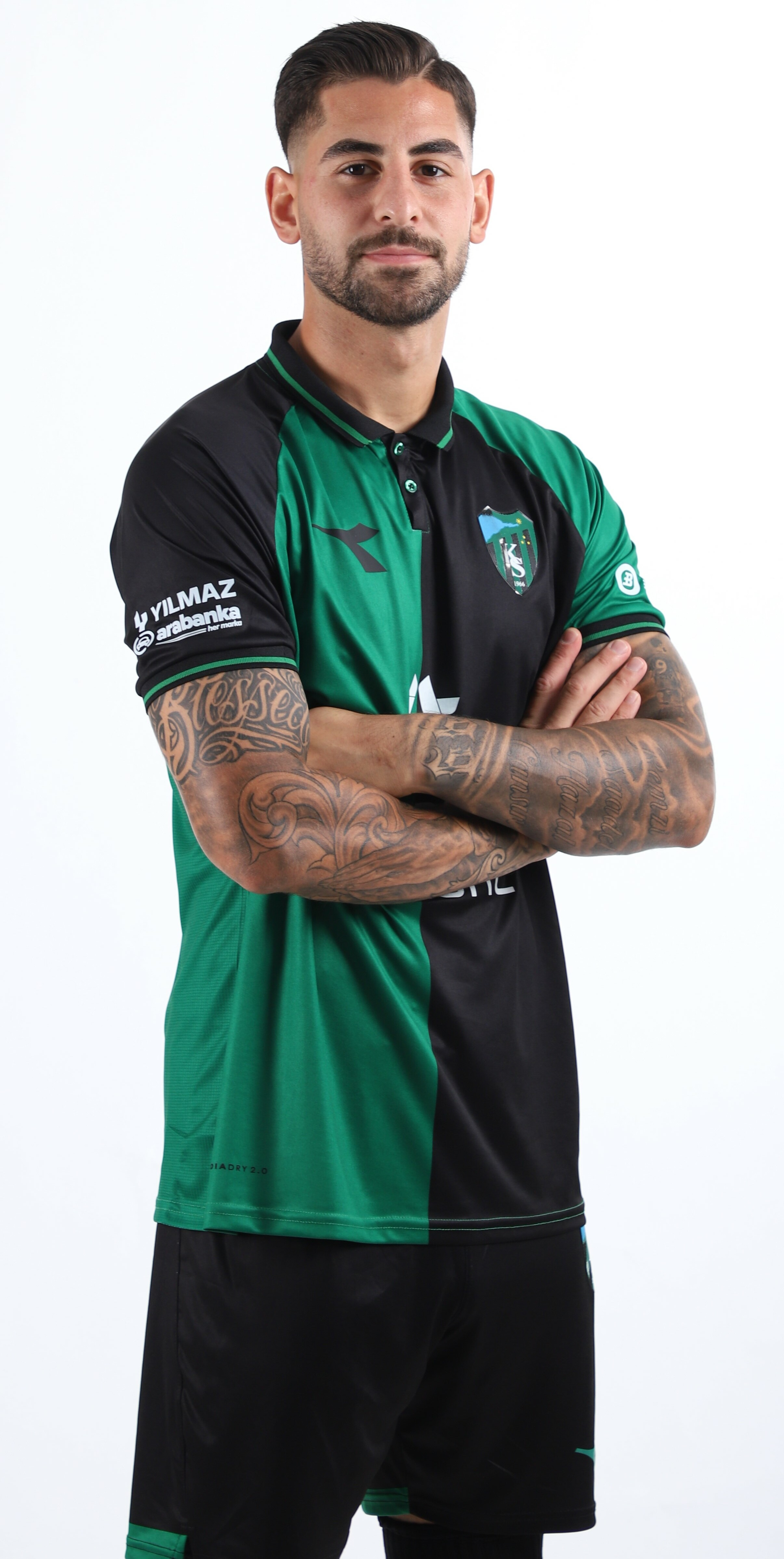

Personal information
- Date of birth: 24 July 1995 (age 31)
- Place of birth: Yenimahalle, Ankara, Turkey
- Height: 1.88 m (6 ft 2 in)
- Position: Forward

Team information
- Current team: 24 Erzincanspor
- Number: 9

Youth career
- 2005–2011: Gençlerbirliği

Senior career*
Years	Team	Apps	(Gls)
2011–2016	Gençlerbirliği	1	(0)
2014	→ Boluspor (loan)	1	(0)
2014–2015	→ Hacettepe (loan)	34	(12)
2016	→ Hacettepe (loan)	19	(7)
2016–2017	Bandırmaspor	33	(12)
2017–2023	İstanbul Başakşehir	11	(0)
2017–2018	→ Adana Demirspor (loan)	31	(7)
2018–2019	→ Ümraniyespor (loan)	32	(5)
2019–2020	→ Samsunspor (loan)	26	(9)
2020–2021	→ Westerlo (loan)	25	(12)
2022-2023	→ Bandırmaspor (loan)	28	(7)
2023–2024	Kocaelispor	16	(0)
2024	→ 1461 Trabzon (loan)	16	(7)
2024–2026	Batman Petrolspor	67	(36)
2026–	24 Erzincanspor	6	(3)

International career
2011	Turkey U16	8	(7)
2011–2012	Turkey U17	13	(8)
2012–2013	Turkey U18	11	(4)
2013–2014	Turkey U19	11	(2)
2013	Turkey A2	3	(1)
2015	Turkey U21	3	(2)
- * Club domestic league appearances and goals as of 11 October 2026

Atabey Çiçek (born 24 July 1995) is a Turkish professional footballer who plays as a forward for TFF 2. Lig club 24 Erzincanspor.

== Career ==
Atabey Çiçek made his Turkish Süper Lig debut for İstanbul Başakşehir on 26 September 2021, coming on as a second-half substitute for Stefano Okaka against Caykur Rizespor.
