= Isaac Tshibangu =

Congolese footballer (born 2003)

Personal information
- Full name: Isaac Tshibangu Tshikuna
- Date of birth: 17 May 2003 (age 23)
- Place of birth: Kinshasa, DR Congo
- Height: 1.73 m (5 ft 8 in)
- Position: Winger

Team information
- Current team: Emirates
- Number: 18

Senior career*
Years	Team	Apps	(Gls)
2019–2021	Mazembe		
2021–2022	RSCA Futures	0	(0)
2022–2023	Bandırmaspor	8	(0)
2023–2024	Al-Nasr	18	(1)
2024–2026	Baniyas	22	(0)
2026–	Emirates	0	(0)

International career^{‡}
2019–	DR Congo	2	(0)
- * Club domestic league appearances and goals as of 16 October 2022 ‡ National team caps and goals as of 7 October 2020

Isaac Tshibangu Tshikuna (born 17 May 2003) is a Congolese professional footballer who plays as a winger for UAE First Division League club Emirates and the DR Congo national team. He was included in The Guardian's "Next Generation 2020".

== International career ==
Tshibangu made his debut with the DR Congo in a 3–2 friendly loss to Rwanda on 18 September 2019.
