= Abdulsamed Damlu =

Turkish footballer

Personal information
- Date of birth: 25 July 1999 (age 27)
- Place of birth: Karlıova, Turkey
- Height: 1.91 m (6 ft 3 in)
- Position: Goalkeeper

Team information
- Current team: Vanspor
- Number: 22

Youth career
- 2010–2014: Yeni Malatyaspor

Senior career*
| Years | Team | Apps | (Gls) |
| 2014–2025 | Yeni Malatyaspor | 54 | (0) |
| 2016 | → Sandıklıspor (loan) | 6 | (0) |
| 2023 | → Eyüpspor (loan) | 0 | (0) |
| 2023–2024 | → Ümraniyespor (loan) | 23 | (0) |
| 2025–2026 | Vanspor | 8 | (0) |
| 2026 | Amedspor | 1 | (0) |
| 2026– | Vanspor | 6 | (0) |
- * Club domestic league appearances and goals as of 7 November 2026

Abdulsamed Damlu (born 25 July 1999) is a Turkish professional footballer who plays as a goalkeeper for TFF 1. Lig club Vanspor.

== Professional career ==
A youth product of Yeni Malatyaspor, Damlu signed his first professional contract with them in 2014 and acted as their backup goalkeeper. He joined Sandıklıspor on loan for the second half of the 2015–16 season. He made his professional debut with Yeni Malatyaspor in a 1-0 Süper Lig win over Antalyaspor on 3 October 2020.
