= Aksel Aktaş =

Turkish footballer (born 1999)

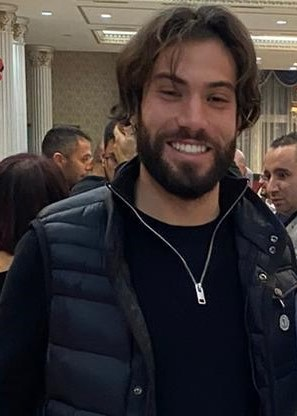

Personal information
- Date of birth: 15 July 1999 (age 27)
- Place of birth: Audincourt, France
- Height: 1.77 m (5 ft 10 in)
- Position: Midfielder

Youth career
- 2005–2007: AS Mezire
- 2007–2016: Sochaux

Senior career*
Years	Team	Apps	(Gls)
2016–2018	Sochaux II	37	(3)
2016–2018	Sochaux	6	(0)
2018–2019	Reims II	28	(1)
2019–2020	Kayserispor	15	(0)
2020–2021	Fatih Karagümrük	9	(0)
2021–2022	Gençlerbirliği	41	(1)
2023–2024	Bandırmaspor	5	(0)
2024–2025	Adana Demirspor	16	(0)
2024	→ Tuzlaspor (loan)	2	(0)

International career^{‡}
2015	France U16	6	(1)
2016	France U18	5	(0)
2018	Turkey U19	2	(0)
- * Club domestic league appearances and goals as of 29 September 2025 ‡ National team caps and goals as of 23 July 2018

Aksel Aktaş (Turkish: Aksel Aktaş; born 15 July 1999) is a footballer who plays as a midfielder. Born in France, he is a former youth international for Turkey.

== Professional career ==
A member of the Sochaux academy since 2007, Aktas signed his first professional contract with them on 16 September 2016. Aktas made his professional debut for Sochaux in a 1–0 Ligue 2 win over Amiens SC on 9 December 2016, at the age of 17.

On 13 July 2018, Aktas signed a three-year contract with Ligue 1 club Stade de Reims.

On 12 August 2019 he has signed a three-year contract with Kayserispor of the Turkish Süper Lig.

== International career ==
Aktas was born in France and is of Turkish descent. A youth international for France, Aktas scored in the first minute in his first international appearance with the France U16s in a friendly 3-0 win over the Morocco U16s.

Aktas was called up to represent the Turkey U19s at the 2018 UEFA European Under-19 Championship. He debuted for the Turkey U19s in a friendly 2-0 loss to the Finland U19s on 5 July 2018.
