= Sergen Piçinciol =

Turkish footballer

Personal information
- Date of birth: 11 October 1995 (age 31)
- Place of birth: Kars, Turkey
- Height: 1.82 m (5 ft 11 1/2 in)
- Position: Centre-back

Team information
- Current team: Aliağa FK
- Number: 35

Senior career*
Years	Team	Apps	(Gls)
2013–2014	Altay	2	(0)
2014–2015	Yeni Malatyaspor	0	(0)
2015–2016	Ayvalıkgücü Belediyespor	33	(1)
2016–2017	Bergama Belediyespor	7	(0)
2017–2018	Çanakkale Dardanelspor	38	(4)
2018–2020	Nazilli Belediyespor	54	(6)
2020–2023	Giresunspor	45	(3)
2023–2025	Bandırmaspor	63	(3)
2025–	Aliağa FK	27	(1)
- * Club domestic league appearances and goals as of 1 October 2026

Sergen Piçinciol (born 11 October 1995) is a Turkish footballer who plays as a centre-back for TFF 2. Lig club Aliağa FK.

== Career ==
Piçinciol began his career in the TFF Second League with Altay, and followed that up with stints at Yeni Malatyaspor, Bergama Belediyespor, Çanakkale Dardanelspor, and Nazilli Belediyespor. He transferred to Giresunspor in the summer of 2020. He helped the team get promoted into the Süper Lig for the first time since 1977. He made his professional debut with Giresunspor in a 1–0 Süper Lig win over Yeni Malatyaspor on 20 November 2021.

On 29 January 2023, Piçinciol signed a 2.5-year contract with Bandırmaspor.
