= Mert Miraç Altıntaş =

Turkish footballer

Personal information
- Date of birth: 13 November 2001 (age 25)
- Place of birth: Trabzon, Turkey
- Height: 1.78 m (5 ft 10 in)
- Position: Winger

Team information
- Current team: Kahramanmaraş İstiklalspor
- Number: 10

Youth career
- 2013–2014: Trabzon Tütünspor
- 2014–2015: Haçka
- 2015–2019: 1461 Trabzon
- 2019–2020: 1461 Trabzon FK

Senior career*
Years	Team	Apps	(Gls)
2020–2021	1461 Trabzon FK	0	(0)
2020–2021	→ Yomraspor (loan)	34	(13)
2021–2025	Yeni Malatyaspor	48	(5)
2023	→ Kuşadasıspor (loan)	9	(2)
2023–2024	→ 68 Aksaray Belediyespor (loan)	1	(0)
2025–2026	Amedspor	3	(0)
2025–2026	→ Mardin 1969 (loan)	29	(7)
2026–	Kahramanmaraş İstiklalspor	8	(0)
- * Club domestic league appearances and goals as of 14 November 2026

Mert Miraç Altıntaş (born 13 November 2001), is a Turkish professional footballer who plays as a winger for TFF 2. Lig club Kahramanmaraş İstiklalspor.

== Professional career ==
Altıntaş began his senior career with Hekimoğlu Trabzon and immediately went on loan with Yomraspor, where he scored 13 goals in 34 games in his first senior season. He transferred to Yeni Malatyaspor on 5 August 2021. He made his professional debut with Yeni Malatyaspor in a 5–1 Süper Lig loss to Trabzonspor on 16 August 2021.
