= Akın Alkan =

Turkish footballer

Personal information
- Date of birth: 31 July 1989 (age 37)
- Place of birth: Üsküdar, Turkey
- Height: 1.86 m (6 ft 1 in)
- Position: Goalkeeper

Team information
- Current team: Bandırmaspor
- Number: 16

Youth career
- 2002–2004: Reşitpaşa
- 2004–2008: Okmeydanı Fetih
- 2008–2009: Dikilitaş

Senior career*
Years	Team	Apps	(Gls)
2009–2012	Beylerbeyi	51	(0)
2012–2014	Batman Petrolspor	7	(0)
2014–2016	Karagümrük	58	(0)
2016–2021	Hatayspor	136	(0)
2021–2022	Ankaragücü	31	(0)
2022–2023	Esenler Erokspor	23	(0)
2023–	Bandırmaspor	38	(0)
- * Club domestic league appearances and goals as of 5 May 2026

Akın Alkan (born 31 July 1989) is a Turkish professional footballer who plays as a goalkeeper for TFF First League club Bandırmaspor.

== Professional career ==
Alkan began his early career in the lower Turkish leagues with Beylerbeyi, Batman Petrolspor, and Karagümrük. In 2016, he transferred to Hatayspor and helped them get promoted into the Süper Lig for the 2020–21 season. He made his professional debut with Hatayspor in a 3–1 Süper Lig loss to Gençlerbirliği on 6 January 2021.
