= Ioannis Gelios =

German-born Greek footballer

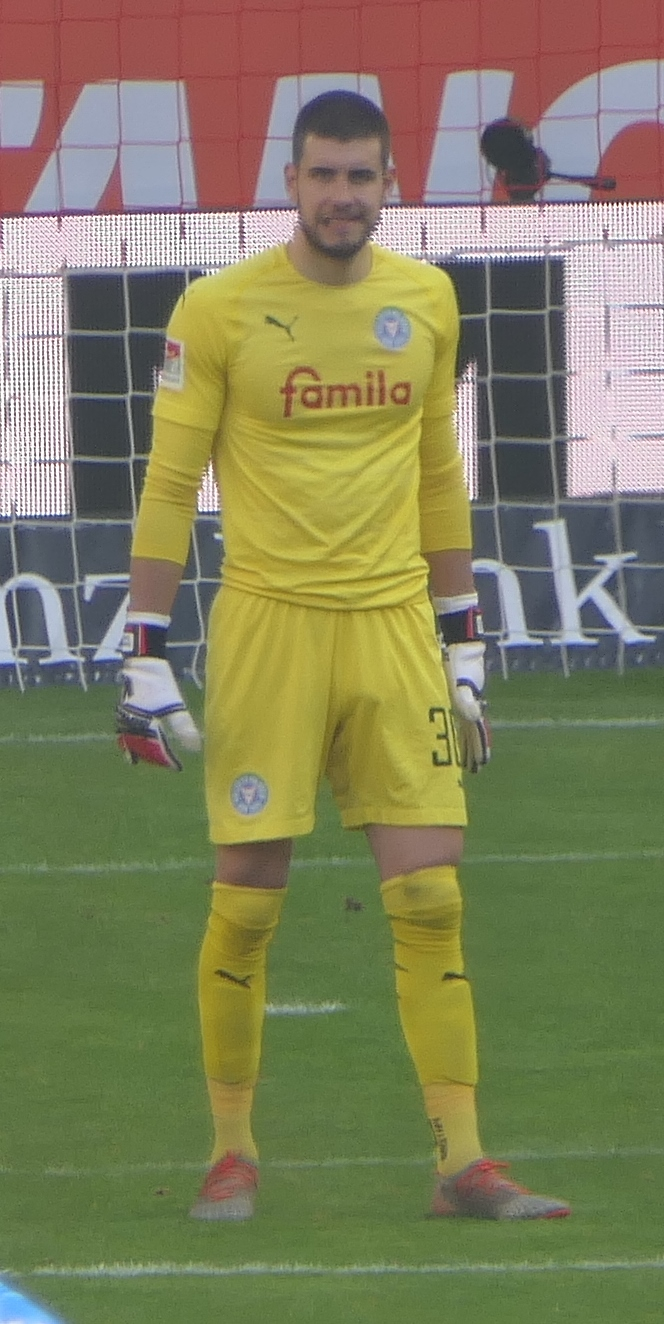
- Gelios with Holstein Kiel in 2019

Personal information
- Date of birth: 24 April 1992 (age 34)
- Place of birth: Augsburg, Germany
- Height: 1.90 m (6 ft 3 in)
- Position: Goalkeeper

Team information
- Current team: Kalamata
- Number: 1

Youth career
- –2000: MBB-SG Augsburg
- 2001–2011: FC Augsburg

Senior career*
Years	Team	Apps	(Gls)
2011–2018	FC Augsburg	0	(0)
2012–2018	FC Augsburg II	112	(0)
2018–2019	Hansa Rostock	37	(0)
2019–2022	Holstein Kiel	63	(0)
2022–2024	Bandırmaspor	51	(0)
2024	Ionikos	12	(0)
2024–2025	Athens Kallithea	17	(0)
2025–	Kalamata	24	(0)

International career
2012	Greece U21	5	(0)
- * Club domestic league appearances and goals as of 13 September 2026

Ioannis Gelios (Greek: Ιωάννης Γκέλιος; born 24 April 1992) is a Greek professional footballer who plays as a goalkeeper for Super League club Kalamata.

== Career ==
Ioannis Gelios was under contract with the professionals of FC Augsburg for eight years, but did not play a single minute in a competitive game. It was only when he switched to Hansa Rostock that he became a regular goalkeeper. He became one of the best goalkeepers in the third division and Holstein Kiel offered him a three years contract in the summer of 2019. He also moved to a higher category, to become a member of the 2.Bundesliga. Out of the 34 matches of the first season, he played in 26. He conceded 42 goals and four times 'kept' his home clean.

== Personal life ==
Gelios' family hails from Dasochori, Serres.

On 9 April 2021, he tested positive for COVID-19.

== Career statistics ==
As of match played 22 May 2025.

Appearances and goals by club, season and competition
Club	Season	League			Cup		Europe		Other		Total	
Club	Season	Division	Apps	Goals	Apps	Goals	Apps	Goals	Apps	Goals	Apps	Goals
FC Augsburg	2010–11	2. Bundesliga	0	0	0	0	—		—		0	0
FC Augsburg	2011–12	Bundesliga	0	0	0	0	—		—		0	0
FC Augsburg	2012–13	Bundesliga	0	0	0	0	—		—		0	0
FC Augsburg	2013–14	Bundesliga	0	0	0	0	—		—		0	0
FC Augsburg	2014–15	Bundesliga	0	0	0	0	—		—		0	0
FC Augsburg	2015–16	Bundesliga	0	0	0	0	0	0	—		0	0
FC Augsburg	2016–17	Bundesliga	0	0	0	0	—		—		0	0
FC Augsburg	2017–18	Bundesliga	0	0	0	0	—		—		0	0
FC Augsburg	Total		0	0	0	0	—		—		0	0
FC Augsburg II	2011–12	Landesliga Bayern-Süd	0	0	—		—		4 (Note: Appearances in the Regionalliga playoff.)	0	4	0
FC Augsburg II	2012–13	Regionalliga Bayern	20	0	—		—		—		20	0
FC Augsburg II	2013–14	Regionalliga Bayern	31	0	—		—		—		31	0
FC Augsburg II	2014–15	Regionalliga Bayern	27	0	—		—		—		27	0
FC Augsburg II	2015–16	Regionalliga Bayern	16	0	—		—		2 (Note: Appearances in the Regionalliga Bayern playoff.)	0	18	0
FC Augsburg II	2016–17	Regionalliga Bayern	6	0	—		—		—		6	0
FC Augsburg II	2017–18	Regionalliga Bayern	12	0	—		—		—		12	0
FC Augsburg II	Total		112	0	—		—		6	0	118	0
Hansa Rostock	2018–19	3. Liga	37	0	2	0	—		—		39	0
Holstein Kiel	2019–20	2. Bundesliga	26	0	1	0	—		—		27	0
Holstein Kiel	2020–21	2. Bundesliga	24	0	3	0	—		—		27	0
Holstein Kiel	2021–22	2. Bundesliga	13	0	1	0	—		—		14	0
Holstein Kiel	Total		63	0	5	0	—		—		68	0
Bandırmaspor	2022–23	TFF 1. Lig	34	0	0	0	—		—		34	0
Bandırmaspor	2023–24	TFF 1. Lig	17	0	0	0	—		—		17	0
Bandırmaspor	Total		51	0	0	0	—		—		51	0
Ionikos	2023–24	Super League Greece 2	12	0	0	0	—		—		12	0
Athens Kallithea	2024–25	Super League Greece 2	17	0	3	0	—		—		20	0
Career total			292	0	10	0	0	0	6	0	308	0
