= Doğan Can Davas =

Turkish footballer

Personal information
- Date of birth: 22 August 1997 (age 29)
- Place of birth: Edirne, Turkey
- Height: 1.70 m (5 ft 7 in)
- Position: Attacking midfielder

Team information
- Current team: Sarıyer

Youth career
- 2009: Uzunköprüspor
- 2009–2016: Galatasaray

Senior career*
| Years | Team | Apps | (Gls) |
| 2017–2019 | Galatasaray | 0 | (0) |
| 2017 | → Erbaaspor (loan) | 19 | (9) |
| 2017–2018 | → Çorum Belediyespor (loan) | 35 | (14) |
| 2018–2019 | → Bandırmaspor (loan) | 22 | (6) |
| 2019–2022 | Bandırmaspor | 69 | (17) |
| 2022–2023 | Giresunspor | 24 | (1) |
| 2023–2024 | Bandırmaspor | 35 | (9) |
| 2024–2025 | Amedspor | 17 | (0) |
| 2025–2026 | Boluspor | 37 | (15) |
| 2026– | Sarıyer | 0 | (0) |
- * Club domestic league appearances and goals as of 6 May 2026

Doğan Can Davas (born 22 August 1997) is a Turkish professional footballer who plays as a midfielder for TFF 1. Lig club Sarıyer.

== Professional career ==
Davas is a youth product of the youth academy of Uzunköprüspor and Galatasaray. He began his senior career on loan with Erbaaspor in the TFF Third League on 25 January 2017. After a strong start with 9 goals in 19 appearances, he moved to Çorum Belediyespor on 29 June 2017 on loan for the 2017–18 season. On 28 June 2018, he moved to Bandırmaspor in the TFF Second League. He stayed with Bandırmaspor permanently after his loan and helped them earn promotion to the TFF First League. After 3 more full seasons with the club, he transferred to newly promoted Giresunspor in the Süper Lig. He made his professional debut with Adana Demirspor in a 2–3 Süper Lig loss on 7 August 2022.

== Personal life ==
Davas' father, Erkan, was a semi-pro footballer who also played for Uzunköprüspor.
