= Kerim Avcı =

Turkish footballer

Kerim Avci
Personal information
- Date of birth: 16 December 1989 (age 36)
- Place of birth: Dortmund, West Germany
- Height: 1.76 m (5 ft 9 in)
- Position: Midfielder

Team information
- Current team: Altınordu
- Number: 18

Youth career
- TSC Eintracht Dortmund
- SG Wattenscheid 09

Senior career*
Years	Team	Apps	(Gls)
2008–2009	Rot-Weiss Essen II	58	(10)
2009–2013	Rot-Weiss Essen	79	(19)
2013–2015	Kayseri Erciyesspor	16	(0)
2015	→ Altınordu (loan)	17	(5)
2015–2016	Balıkesirspor	28	(8)
2016–2017	Sivasspor	20	(3)
2017–2018	Altınordu	30	(16)
2018–2020	Gaziantep	27	(6)
2020	→ Altay (loan)	15	(3)
2020–2021	Adana Demirspor	4	(0)
2021	Gençlerbirliği	3	(1)
2021–2023	Bandırmaspor	59	(14)
2023–2025	Iğdır	17	(1)
2024	→ Esenler Erokspor (loan)	1	(0)
2025	Bandırmaspor	11	(0)
2025–	Altınordu	8	(1)
- * Club domestic league appearances and goals as of 26 November 2025

Kerim Avci (born 16 December 1989) is a Turkish-German footballer who plays as a midfielder for TFF 2. Lig club Altınordu.
