= Atakan Müjde =

Turkish footballer

Personal information
- Date of birth: 25 October 2003 (age 23)
- Place of birth: Adapazarı, Turkey
- Height: 1.82 m (5 ft 11 1/2 in)
- Position: Midfielder

Team information
- Current team: Kasımpaşa

Youth career
- 2013–2020: Pendikspor

Senior career*
Years	Team	Apps	(Gls)
2020–2021	Pendikspor	8	(0)
2021–2025	Yeni Malatyaspor	30	(0)
2021	→ Pendikspor (loan)	21	(1)
2023	→ Pendikspor (loan)	0	(0)
2023–2024	→ Sarıyer (loan)	24	(0)
2025-	Kasımpaşa	1	(0)
2026	→ Amedspor (loan)	6	(0)
- * Club domestic league appearances and goals as of 5 May 2026

Atakan Müjde (born 25 October 2003) is a Turkish footballer who plays as a midfielder for Süper Lig club Kasımpaşa.

== Career ==
A youth product of Pendikspor, Müjde began his senior career with the club in the TFF Second League in 2020. He transferred to Yeni Malatyaspor on 31 January 2021, and was then loaned back to Pendikspor to finish the season. He made his professional debut with Yeni Malayaspor in a 1–0 Süper Lig loss to İstanbul Başakşehir on 4 April 2022.

== International career ==
Müjde was called up to a training camp for the Turkey U18s in June 2021.
