= Marino (footballer, born 1986) =

Brazilian footballer

Personal information
- Full name: Marino da Silva
- Date of birth: 18 February 1986 (age 40)
- Place of birth: São Manuel, Brazil
- Height: 1.82 m (6 ft 0 in)
- Position: Midfielder

Senior career*
Years	Team	Apps	(Gls)
2010	CENE	6	(2)
2011	Audax-SP	8	(0)
2011	Oeste	10	(0)
2011	→ Icasa (loan)	9	(1)
2011–2013	Atlético Goianiense	58	(4)
2013	→ Sport (loan)	4	(0)
2014–2016	São Bernardo	44	(9)
2014	→ Sampaio Corrêa (loan)	19	(0)
2015	→ Náutico (loan)	31	(2)
2016	→ Ceará (loan)	12	(0)
2016–2017	Bandırmaspor	33	(4)
2017	Bragantino	9	(2)
2018	São Caetano	3	(1)
2018	→ Cuiabá (loan)	21	(9)
2019–2020	Cuiabá	32	(0)
2020	Mirassol	0	(0)
2020	Criciúma	6	(0)
2021	Santo André	13	(1)
2021	Paysandu	16	(2)
2022	Madureira	7	(0)
2022	Betim	13	(1)
- * Club domestic league appearances and goals

Marino da Silva (born 18 February 1986) is a Brazilian former professional footballer who played as a midfielder.
