= Doğukan Emeksiz =

Turkish footballer

Personal information
- Date of birth: 5 January 2000 (age 26)
- Place of birth: Kâğıthane, Turkey
- Height: 1.79 m (5 ft 10 in)
- Position: Winger

Team information
- Current team: Menemen
- Number: 10

Youth career
- 2008–2012: Seyrantepe Ofspor
- 2012–2013: Harmantepe
- 2013: Beşiktaş
- 2013–2017: Sarıyer

Senior career*
Years	Team	Apps	(Gls)
2017–2021	Sarıyer	47	(6)
2021–2023	Yeni Malatyaspor	22	(3)
2021–2022	→ Afjet Afyonspor (loan)	33	(6)
2023–2024	Manisa	23	(0)
2024–2025	Adanaspor	21	(1)
2025–	Mardin	12	(1)
2025–	Menemen	15	(4)
- * Club domestic league appearances and goals as of 1 October 2026

Doğukan Emeksiz (born 5 January 2000) is a Turkish professional footballer who plays as a winger for TFF 2. Lig club Menemen.

== Professional career ==
Emeksiz began his career with Sarıyer in the Second League before transferring to Yeni Malatyaspor on 1 September 2020. On 24 January 2021, Emeksiz made his professional debut in a 1-0 Süper Lig loss to Galatasaray.
