= Fatih Kuruçuk =

Turkish footballer (born 1998)

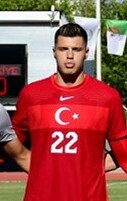
- Kuruçuk in 2022

Personal information
- Date of birth: 21 January 1998 (age 28)
- Place of birth: Balçova, Turkey
- Height: 1.92 m (6 ft 4 in)
- Position: Defender

Team information
- Current team: Fethiyespor
- Number: 22

Youth career
- 2008–2009: Bucaspor
- 2009–2015: Göztepe

Senior career*
Years	Team	Apps	(Gls)
2015–2017	Göztepe	0	(0)
2017	→ Fethiyespor (loan)	7	(0)
2017–2021	Fatih Karagümrük	88	(7)
2021–2022	Hatayspor	28	(0)
2022–2023	Bandırmaspor	18	(3)
2023–2025	Adanaspor	64	(5)
2025–2026	Fatih Karagümrük	5	(0)
2025	→ Sarıyer (loan)	10	(0)
2026–	Fethiyespor	3	(0)

International career^{‡}
2014	Turkey U17	1	(0)
2019	Turkey U21	1	(0)
2022	Turkey U23	4	(0)
Medal record
Men's football
Representing Turkey
Islamic Solidarity Games
Gold medal – first place	2021 Konya
- * Club domestic league appearances and goals as of 17 October 2026 ‡ National team caps and goals as of 06:35, 2 February 2023 (UTC)

Fatih Kuruçuk (born 21 January 1998) is a Turkish professional footballer who plays as a defender for TFF 2. Lig club Fethiyespor.

== Career ==
Kuruçuk is a youth product of Göztepe, and moved to Göztepe in 2017. Kuruçuk made his with Fatih Karagümrük in a 1-1 Süper Lig tie with Sivasspor on 21 November 2020. On 2 June 2020, he transferred to Hatayspor, signing a 2-year contract.

== International career ==
Kuruçuk represented the Turkey U23s in their winning campaign at the 2021 Islamic Solidarity Games.

== Honours ==
Turkey U23

- Islamic Solidarity Games: 2021
