= Rahman Buğra Çağıran =

Turkish footballer

Rahman Çağıran
Personal information
- Full name: Rahman Buğra Çağıran
- Date of birth: 1 January 1995 (age 31)
- Place of birth: Gümüşhane, Turkey
- Height: 1.78 m (5 ft 10 in)
- Position: Midfielder

Team information
- Current team: Batman Petrolspor
- Number: 26

Youth career
- 2006–2014: Trabzonspor

Senior career*
Years	Team	Apps	(Gls)
2014–2015	Trabzonspor	0	(0)
2014–2015	→ Arsinspor (loan)	30	(6)
2015–2016	Arsinspor	31	(5)
2016–2023	Yeni Malatyaspor	85	(4)
2020	→ Hatayspor (loan)	6	(1)
2020–2021	→ Samsunspor (loan)	13	(0)
2021	→ BB Erzurumspor (loan)	12	(1)
2023	→ Gençlerbirliği (loan)	7	(3)
2023–2025	Gençlerbirliği	48	(6)
2025–2026	Boluspor	13	(0)
2026–	Batman Petrolspor	4	(1)

International career
2012	Turkey U17	5	(0)
2013	Turkey U18	2	(0)
2015	Turkey U20	3	(0)
- * Club domestic league appearances and goals as of 14 September 2026

Rahman Buğra Çağıran (born 1 January 1995) is a Turkish footballer who plays as midfielder for TFF 1. Lig club Batman Petrolspor.

== Professional career ==
Rahman moved to Yeni Malatyaspor in 2016 after successful spell in the lower divisions with Arsinspor. Rahman made his professional debut for Yeni Malatyaspor in a 1–1 Süper Lig tie with Antalyaspor on 26 August 2017.
