= Burak Efe Yaz =

Turkish footballer

Personal information
- Date of birth: 18 August 2003 (age 23)
- Place of birth: Malatya, Turkey
- Position: Attacking midfielder

Team information
- Current team: Yeni Malatyaspor
- Number: 10

Youth career
- Yeni Malatyaspor

Senior career*
Years	Team	Apps	(Gls)
2022–	Yeni Malatyaspor	23	(0)
2022–2023	→ Bayburt Öİ (loan)	0	(0)
2023–2024	→ Malatya Arguvan SK (loan)	8	(1)
2025	→ Amasyaspor FK (loan)	1	(0)
- * Club domestic league appearances and goals as of 8 November 2025

Burak Efe Yaz (born 18 August 2003) is a Turkish footballer who plays as an attacking midfielder for TFF 2. Lig club Yeni Malatyaspor.

== Career ==
Yaz is a youth product of Yeni Malatyaspor, and signed his first professional contract with them in 2020 for 3 years. He made his professional debut with them in a 3–0 Süper Lig loss to Kayserispor on 14 May 2022.
