= Uzunköprüspor =

Turkish sports club

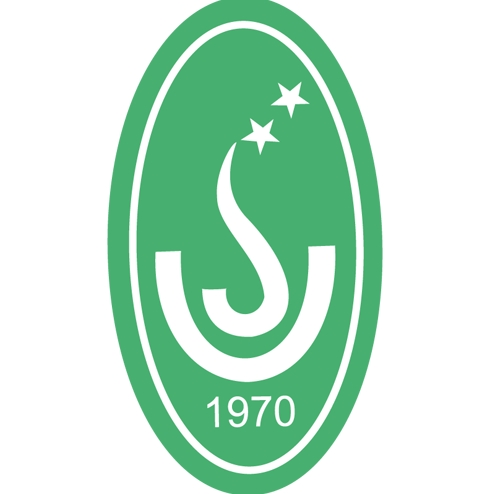
- Full name: Uzunköprüspor
- Founded: 1970
- Ground: Uzunköprü Ergene Stadyumu, Edirne
- Capacity: 800
- League: Amatör Futbol Ligleri
Home colours	Away colours

Uzunköprüspor is a Turkish sports club from Uzunköprü near Edirne in Turkey. The clubs plays in yellow and green kits, and have done so since their formation in 1970. In 2013–2014 season, Uzunköprüspor participated in Amatör Futbol Ligleri.

== Stadium ==
Currently the team plays at the 800 capacity Uzunköprü Ergene Stadyumu.

== Honours ==
- TFF Third League:1987–1988

== League participations ==
- TFF Second League: 1988–1989
- TFF Third League: 1989–?
- Turkish Regional Amateur League: ?
