= Ogün Özçiçek =

Turkish footballer (born 1999)

Personal information
- Date of birth: 24 January 1999 (age 27)
- Place of birth: Zonguldak, Turkey
- Height: 1.72 m (5 ft 8 in)
- Position: Defensive midfielder

Team information
- Current team: Gaziantep
- Number: 25

Youth career
- 2012–2018: Araklı 1961 Spor

Senior career*
Years	Team	Apps	(Gls)
2018–2019	Araklı 1961 Spor	24	(0)
2019–2021	Yomraspor	55	(4)
2021–2024	Yeni Malatyaspor	21	(1)
2021–2022	→ Adıyaman (loan)	19	(1)
2022	→ Vanspor (loan)	13	(0)
2023	→ Çaykur Rizespor (loan)	13	(1)
2023–2024	→ Gaziantep (loan)	29	(3)
2024–	Gaziantep	46	(0)
- * Club domestic league appearances and goals as of 10 June 2026

Ogün Özçiçek (born 24 January 1999) is a Turkish football player who plays as a defensive midfielder for Gaziantep in the Süper Lig.

== Professional career ==
Özçiçek is a youth product of Araklı 1961 Spor, and began his senior career with them in the Turkish Regional Amateur League in 2018. In 2019, he transferred to the TFF Third League club Yomraspor where he stayed for 2 seasons. On 14 August 2021, he moved to Yeni Malatyaspor on a 3+1 year contract. He spent the first half of the 2021–22 season with Adıyaman, and the second half with Vanspor.

Özçiçek returned to Yeni Malatyaspor for the first half of the 2022–23 season in the TFF First League. In January 2023, he spent a half season on loan with Çaykur Rizespor after the 2023 Turkey–Syria earthquakes. On 11 August 2023, he joined Gaziantep on loan in the Süper Lig. On 9 August 2024, he transferred to Gaziantep permanently on a 3-year contract.
