= Haqi Osman =

Ghanaian footballer

Personal information
- Date of birth: 11 April 2002 (age 24)
- Place of birth: Hamile, Wa, Ghana
- Height: 1.73 m (5 ft 8 in)
- Position: Winger

Senior career*
Years	Team	Apps	(Gls)
2020–2021	Planners Athletic Club		
2021–2023	Yeni Malatyaspor	31	(5)
2022–2023	→ Çaykur Rizespor (loan)	3	(0)
2023–2026	Bodrum	41	(3)
2025–2026	→ Keçiörengücü (loan)	12	(1)
- * Club domestic league appearances and goals as of 30 August 2026

Haqi Osman (born 11 April 2002) is a Ghanaian professional footballer who plays as a winger.

== Professional career ==
Osman began his career with the Ghanaian club Planners Athletic Club, and transferred to the Turkish club Yeni Malatyaspor on 1 February 2021. He made his professional debut with Yeni Malatyaspor in a 5–1 Süper Lig loss to Trabzonspor on 16 August 2021.
