= New Malatya Stadium =

Stadium in the city of Malatya, Turkey

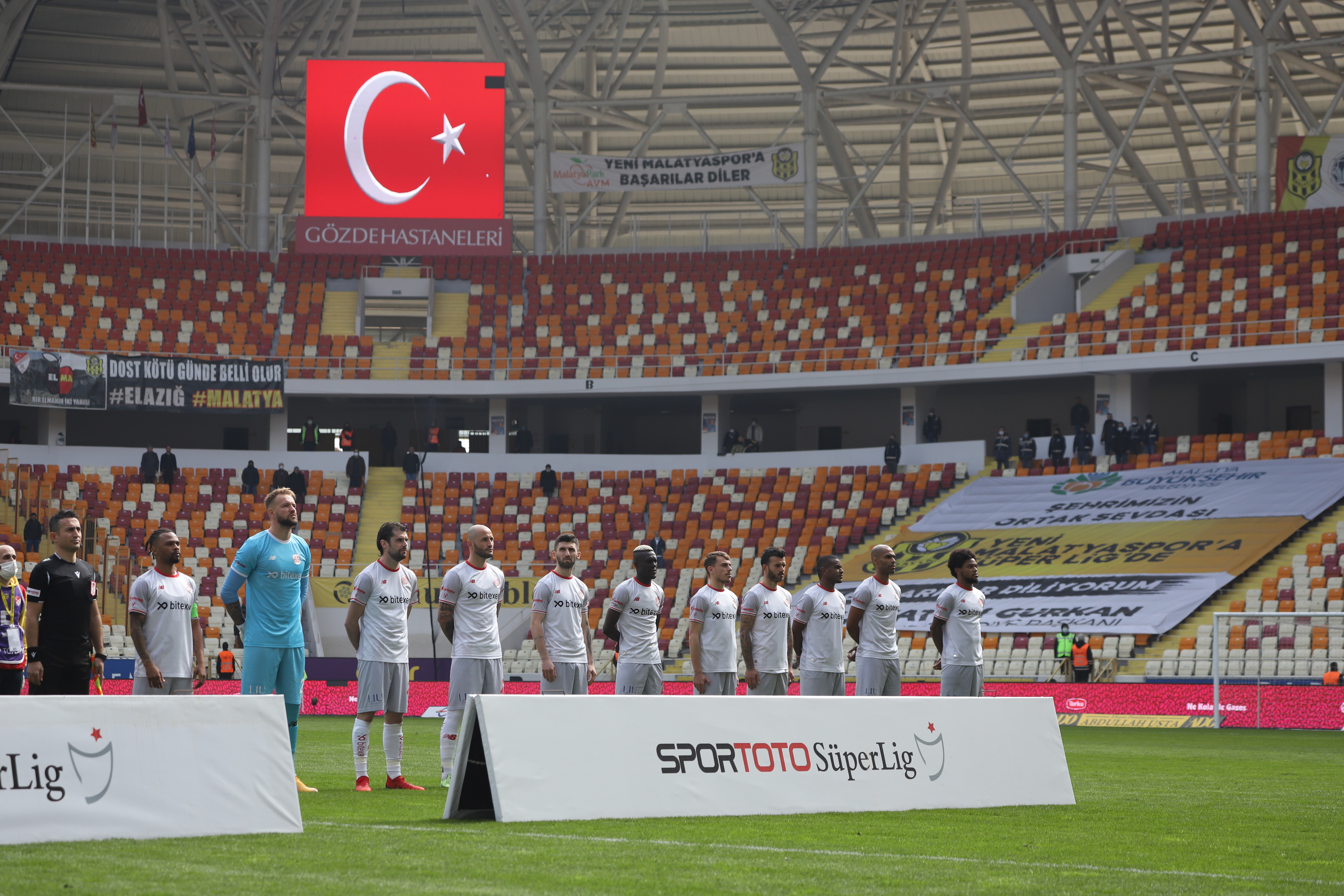
- Yeni Malatyaspor vs Antalyaspor 2022
- Interactive map of New Malatya Stadium
- Location: Malatya, Turkey
- Coordinates: 38°20′14″N 38°26′45″E
- Operator: Yeni Malatyaspor
- Capacity: 25,745
- Executive suites: 26
- Record attendance: 21,677 (Yeni Malatyaspor–Galatasaray, 17 December 2017)

Construction
- Groundbreaking: 11 May 2012
- Built: 2012–2017
- Opened: 16 September 2017
- Cost: ₺60.000.000

Tenant
- Yeni Malatyaspor (2017–present)

The New Malatya Stadium (Turkish: Yeni Malatya Stadyumu) is a stadium in Malatya, Turkey. It was opened to public in 2017 with a capacity of 25,745 spectators. It is the new home of Yeni Malatyaspor, currently playing in the TFF First League. It has replaced the club's former home, Malatya İnönü Stadium.
