= Hakan Bilgiç =

Turkish footballer

Personal information
- Date of birth: 30 October 1992 (age 34)
- Place of birth: Midyat, Mardin, Turkey
- Height: 1.84 m (6 ft 0 in)
- Position: Defender

Team information
- Current team: Bandırmaspor
- Number: 77

Senior career*
Years	Team	Apps	(Gls)
2011–2014	Brussels	40	(2)
2014–2017	Elazığspor	73	(6)
2017–2018	Sivasspor	13	(0)
2018–2019	Adana Demirspor	33	(0)
2020–2021	Bandırmaspor	29	(2)
2021–2025	Boluspor	86	(2)
2025	Bandırmaspor	13	(0)
2025–2026	Ankara Keçiörengücü	23	(0)
2026–	Bandırmaspor	3	(0)
- * Club domestic league appearances and goals as of 17 October 2026

Hakan Bilgiç (born 30 October 1992) is a Turkish professional footballer who plays as a defender for TFF 1. Lig club Bandırmaspor.

== Professional career ==
Hakan was born in Turkey and moved to Belgium at the age of 6. He began his footballing career as a youth with the Belgian club Brussels FC. After a couple successful seasons with Elazığspor in the TFF First League, Hakan moved to Sivasspor. Hakan made his professional debut for Sivasspor in a 1–0 Süper Lig loss to Akhisar Belediyespor on 12 August 2017.
