= Rémi Mulumba =

Congolese footballer (born 1992)

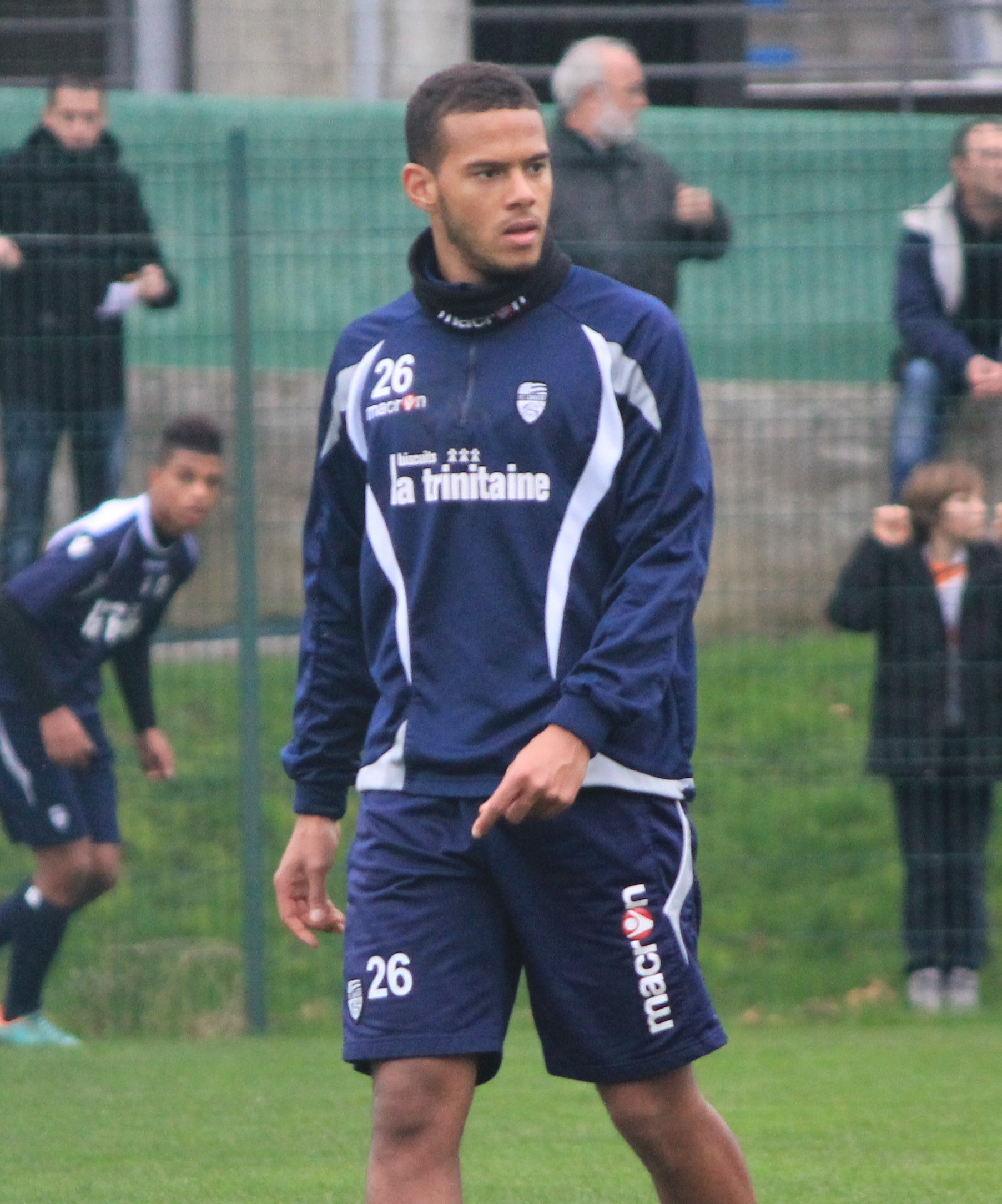
- Mulumba training with Lorient in 2013

Personal information
- Full name: Rémi José Michel Mulumba
- Date of birth: 2 November 1992 (age 34)
- Place of birth: Abbeville, France
- Height: 1.78 m (5 ft 10 in)
- Position: Midfielder

Team information
- Current team: Bandırmaspor
- Number: 6

Youth career
- 1998–2006: Abbeville
- 2006–2010: Amiens

Senior career*
Years	Team	Apps	(Gls)
2010	Amiens	3	(0)
2010–2016	Lorient	17	(0)
2013	→ Dijon (loan)	14	(0)
2013–2014	→ Dijon (loan)	18	(0)
2014–2015	→ Auxerre (loan)	29	(2)
2016–2018	Gazélec Ajaccio	38	(1)
2018–2019	Eupen	31	(0)
2019–2021	Châteauroux	50	(4)
2021–	Bandırmaspor	142	(4)

International career^{‡}
2008	France U17	3	(0)
2010	France U18	2	(0)
2011	France U19	7	(0)
2012	France U20	4	(1)
2015–	DR Congo	4	(0)
- * Club domestic league appearances and goals as of 5 May 2026 ‡ National team caps and goals as of 10:10, 2 January 2018 (UTC)

Rémi José Michel Mulumba (born 2 November 1992) is a professional footballer who plays as a midfielder for Turkish club Bandırmaspor. Born in France, he is a former France youth international who plays for the DR Congo national team.

== Career ==
Mulumba was born in Abbeville. He joined Amiens in 2006 and made his debut for the club on 7 May 2010 in a league match against Bayonne. On 12 July 2010, Mulumba signed a three-year professional contract with FC Lorient.

On 20 August 2019, he signed a two-year contract with Châteauroux.

On 6 July 2021, he joined Bandırmaspor in Turkey on a two-year contract.

== Personal life ==
Mulumba is the son of former football player Albert Mulumba, a former player of SC Abbeville, whom the younger Mulumba began his career with.
