= Bandırma 17 September Stadium =

Sports venue in Turkey

- Bandırma 17 Eylül Stadyumu
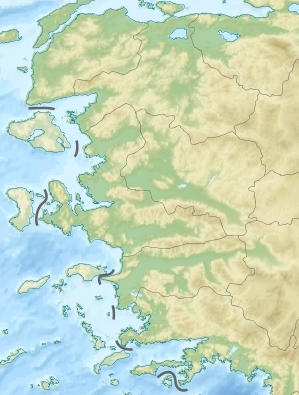
- Location in Western Turkey Location in Turkey
- Location: Bandırma, Balıkesir, Turkey
- Coordinates: 40°20′17″N 27°59′05″E
- Owner: Bandırmaspor
- Operator: Bandırmaspor
- Capacity: 12,275
- Surface: Grass

Construction
- Opened: 1995

The Bandırma 17 September Stadium (Turkish: Bandırma 17 Eylül Stadyumu) , or simply 17 September Stadium, is a multi-use stadium in Bandırma, Balıkesir, Turkey. It is currently used mostly for football matches and is the home ground of Bandırmaspor. The stadium holds 12,275 people and was built in 1995.
