= Yeni Malatyaspor =

Turkish football club

- Full name: Yeni Malatya Spor Kulübü
- Short name: YMS
- Founded: 1986; 40 years ago (as Malatya Belediyespor)
- Ground: New Malatya Stadium
- Capacity: 27000
- President: Haşim Karadağ
- Head coach: Cemil Tonguç
- League: TFF 3. Lig
- 2025–26: TFF 2. Lig, Red, 18th of 18 (relegated)
- Website: www.yenimalatyaspor.org.tr
Home colours	Away colours	Third colours

Yeni Malatyaspor Kulübü is a Turkish professional football club based in Malatya. The club plays in the TFF Second League, which is the third tier of football in the country.

== History ==
Founded in 1986 as Malatya Belediyespor. Its primary colors are yellow, black, and red, although they originally wore orange and green.

In 2022, the club's chairman Adil Gevrek resigned from his position, the same season the club guaranteed its relegation to the TFF First League.

Goalkeeper Ahmet Eyüp Türkaslan was killed by rubble from a collapsed building in the aftermath of the 2023 Turkey–Syria earthquake on February 6. Following the earthquake, the club withdrew from the league. Due to the severe damage to its facilities the club did not participate in the TFF First league 2023–24 season.

== League appearances ==
- Süper Lig: 2017–2022
- TFF First League: 1999–00, 2015–17, 2022–2025
- TFF Second League: 1998–99, 2000–01, 2008–09, 2010–15, 2025–2026
- TFF Third League: 2007–08, 2009–10, 2026–
- Amateur League: 1986–98, 2001–07

== Club honours ==
Leagues

- TFF First League: Runners-up: 2016–17
- TFF Second League: League champions: 2014–15
- TFF Third League: Play-off champions: 2009–10

== European record ==
As of 15 August 2019

Competition	Pld	W	D	L	GF	GA	GD
UEFA Europa League	4	2	1	1	5	5	0

Season	Competition	Round	Club	Home	Away	Agg.
2019–20	UEFA Europa League	2Q	(Slovenia) Olimpija Ljubljana	2–2	1–0	3–2
2019–20	UEFA Europa League	3Q	(Serbia) Partizan	1–0	1–3	2–3

Notes

- QR: Qualifying round

UEFA Ranking history:

As of 21 June 2023

Season	Rank	Points	Ref.
2020	170 ▲	6.720	
2021	182 ▼	6.020	
2022	248 ▼	5.420	
2023	206 ▲	6.420	
2024			

== Players ==
=== Current squad ===
As of 8 December 2025

Note: Flags indicate national team as defined under FIFA eligibility rules; some limited exceptions apply. Players may hold more than one non-FIFA nationality.

No.	Pos.	Nation	Player
3	DF	TUR	Eray Şişman
4	DF	TUR	Muhammed Göktürk Gök
5	DF	TUR	Talha Garip
6	MF	TUR	Ömer Çağrı Ataş
7	FW	TUR	Mehmet Emin Taştan
8	MF	TUR	Enes Nas
10	MF	TUR	Burak Efe Yaz
13	GK	TUR	Çınar Yıldızlı
17	FW	TUR	Kerem Altunışık
18	FW	TUR	Ahmet Barman
19	FW	TUR	Onur Nazlı
21	FW	TUR	Mehmet Veysi Yılmaz
25	GK	TUR	Erhan Açıkgöz

No.	Pos.	Nation	Player
33	DF	TUR	Kürşat Selamoğlu
44	DF	TUR	Ferhat Canlı
47	MF	TUR	Kemalcan Esen
55	DF	TUR	Miraç Küçük
66	MF	TUR	Murat Şamil Güler
77	DF	TUR	Ekrem Anuk
81	DF	TUR	Emirhan Yılmazer
85	DF	TUR	Muhammet Emir Ulusoy
94	MF	TUR	Muhammed Mustafa Tatar
97	GK	TUR	Cemil Semih Uğur
99	FW	TUR	Osman Katipoğlu
—	DF	TUR	Berat Yaman
