= Bandırmaspor =

Association football club

- Full name: Teksüt Bandırma Spor Kulübü
- Nickname: Ban-Ban
- Founded: 1965; 61 years ago
- Ground: 17 September Stadium, Bandırma
- Capacity: 12,237
- Coordinates: 40°20′17″N 27°59′05″E
- Owner: Onur Göçmez
- Chairman: Serdar Kuter
- Head coach: Ertuğrul Arslan
- League: TFF 1. Lig
- 2025–26: TFF 1. Lig, 8th of 20
- Website: www.bandirmaspor.com.tr
Home colours	Away colours

Bandırmaspor is a Turkish professional football club located in the town of Bandırma, Balıkesir Province and currently plays in the TFF First League.

== History ==
The club was founded in 1965 after a merger between amateur sides İdmanyurdu Gençlik and Marmara Gençlik. Hasan Sur was the first chairman of the club. On September 5, 1965 the first match was played against Sarıyer, defeating them 1-0 at the Balıkesir Atatürk Stadium. The first ever starting XI were: Özkay, Şevket, Seracettin, Çetin, K.Ahmet, B.Ahmet, Erkan, Cavit, K.Özkan, K.Cengiz, B.Cengiz.

The greatest achievement in cup competitions was reaching the semi-finals of the Turkish Cup in the 1966–67 season, losing 1–3 on aggregate against Altay in a two-legged tie after knocking out PTT 1–0 on aggregate in the quarter finals.

== Honours ==
- 2.Lig
  - Winners: 2019–20
  - Play-off winner: 2015–16
- 3.Lig
  - Winners: 1974–75, 1988–89, 2009–10

== Players ==
=== Current squad ===
As of 23 September 2026

Note: Flags indicate national team as defined under FIFA eligibility rules; some limited exceptions apply. Players may hold more than one non-FIFA nationality.

No.	Pos.	Nation	Player
3	DF	TUR	Ahmet Biler
4	DF	BEN	Cédric Hountondji
6	MF	BRA	Lucas Lima (Captain)
7	FW	TUR	Harun Genç (on loan from Esenler Erokspor)
8	MF	ALB	Dean Liço
9	FW	BEL	Gianni Bruno
10	MF	TUR	Muhammed Gümüşkaya
11	FW	NGR	Tosin Kehinde
14	DF	TUR	Yusuf Kocatürk
16	GK	TUR	Akın Alkan
17	MF	TUR	Emirhan Ayhan
18	MF	TUR	Cem Türkmen
19	DF	TUR	Arda Midiliç
20	MF	TUR	Enes Çinemre
21	MF	TUR	Mehmet Eray Özbek

No.	Pos.	Nation	Player
22	DF	TUR	Ali Ülgen (on loan from Erzurumspor)
23	MF	TUR	Kerem Dönertaş
25	GK	TUR	Bartu Kulbilge
27	FW	SEN	Dame Seck
29	FW	SEN	Amidou Badji
34	DF	TUR	Enes Aydın
62	DF	TUR	Gani Burgaz
65	DF	TUR	Cumali Gürsel (on loan from Beşiktaş)
77	DF	TUR	Hakan Bilgiç
83	MF	TUR	Atalay Atcı
86	DF	TUR	Burak Bekaroğlu
90	FW	TUR	Yalın Dilek (on loan from Galatasaray)
92	MF	COD	Rémi Mulumba
99	GK	TUR	Furkan Bekleviç

=== Out on loan ===
Note: Flags indicate national team as defined under FIFA eligibility rules; some limited exceptions apply. Players may hold more than one non-FIFA nationality.

No. / Pos. / Nation / Player; — / FW / MLI / Wilson Samaké (at Vaasan Palloseura until 31 December 2026)	No. / Pos. / Nation / Player; — / FW / TUR / Tümer Oruç (at Kahramanmaraş İstiklalspor until 30 June 2027)
