= 2025–26 FC Slovan Liberec season =

68th season in existence of FC Slovan Liberec

Slovan Liberec
2025–26 season
- Chairman: Petra Kania
- Head coach: Radoslav Kováč
- Stadium: Stadion u Nisy
- Czech First League: 6th
- Czech Cup: Third Round
- Average home league attendance: 4,224
Home colours	Away colours

The 2025–26 season was the 67th season in the history of FC Slovan Liberec, and the club's 32nd consecutive season in top flight of Czech football. In addition to the domestic league, the club participated in the Czech Cup.

== Players ==
As of 25 April 2026

Note: Flags indicate national team as defined under FIFA eligibility rules; some limited exceptions apply. Players may hold more than one non-FIFA nationality.

No.	Pos.	Nation	Player
1	GK	SVK	Ivan Krajčírik
3	DF	CZE	Jan Mikula
4	DF	SVK	Martin Rýzek
5	DF	CZE	Petr Hodouš
7	MF	NGR	Afolabi Soliu
8	MF	CZE	Marek Icha
9	FW	CZE	Lukáš Mašek
10	MF	KOS	Qëndrim Zyba
11	FW	CZE	Filip Špatenka
12	MF	CZE	Vojtěch Stránský
14	DF	TOG	Augustin Drakpe
15	MF	CZE	Milan Lexa
16	DF	FRA	Ange N'Guessan
17	FW	CZE	Petr Juliš
18	DF	CZE	Josef Koželuh

No.	Pos.	Nation	Player
20	MF	BIH	Ermin Mahmić
21	FW	SVK	Lukáš Letenay
22	DF	CZE	Jan Knapík
23	DF	BIH	Haris Berbić
24	MF	SVK	Patrik Dulay
26	MF	CZE	Lukáš Masopust
27	DF	UGA	Aziz Kayondo
28	MF	CZE	Vojtěch Sychra
29	FW	CZE	Daniel Rus (on loan from Sparta Prague)
30	MF	CIV	Toumani Diakité
32	DF	CZE	Šimon Gabriel
33	GK	CZE	Lukáš Pešl
40	GK	CZE	Tomáš Koubek
99	FW	LAT	Raimonds Krollis

== Transfers ==
=== In ===
Date	Pos.	Player	From	Type	Fee	Ref.
30 June 2025	FW	(Slovakia) Ľubomír Tupta	(Poland) Widzew Łódź	Loan return	—N/a	
30 June 2025	GK	(Czech Republic) Hugo Jan Bačkovský	(Czech Republic) Ružomberok	Loan return	—N/a	
30 June 2025	DF	(Greece) Marios Pourzitidis	(Czech Republic) Dukla Prague	Loan return	—N/a	
30 June 2025	MF	(Czech Republic) Milan Lexa	(Czech Republic) Varnsdorf	Loan return	—N/a	
30 June 2025	DF	(Netherlands) Olaf Kok	(Czech Republic) Vyškov	Loan return	—N/a	
30 June 2025	MF	(Czech Republic) Tomáš Polyák	(Czech Republic) Silon Táborsko	Loan return	—N/a	
30 June 2025	GK	(Czech Republic) Lukáš Pešl	(Czech Republic) Varnsdorf	Loan return	—N/a	
1 July 2025	FW	(Czech Republic) Filip Špatenka	(Czech Republic) Dukla Prague	Transfer	€200,000	
1 July 2025	MF	(Czech Republic) Vojtěch Stránský	(Czech Republic) Mladá Boleslav	Transfer	Free	
1 July 2025	FW	(Czech Republic) Lukáš Mašek	(Czech Republic) Mladá Boleslav	Transfer	Free	
1 July 2025	MF	(Czech Republic) Lukáš Masopust	(Czech Republic) Slavia Prague	Transfer	Undisclosed	
1 July 2025	MF	(Bosnia and Herzegovina) Ermin Mahmić	(Austria) Lafnitz	Transfer	Undisclosed	
1 July 2025	MF	(Nigeria) Afolabi Soliu	(Czech Republic) Silon Táborsko	Transfer	Undisclosed	
2 July 2025	DF	(Czech Republic) Petr Hodouš	(Poland) Sparta Prague	Transfer	Undisclosed	
3 July 2025	GK	(El Salvador) Ivan Krajčírik	(Poland) Widzew Łódź	Transfer	€50,000	
9 July 2025	FW	(Czech Republic) Petr Juliš	(Czech Republic) Hradec Králové	Transfer	€450,000	
18 July 2025	MF	(Czech Republic) Hynek Hruška	(Czech Republic) Sparta Prague B	Transfer	Free	
25 July 2025	DF	(France) Ange N'Guessan	(Italy) Torino	Loan	Undisclosed	
4 September 2025	MF	(Ivory Coast) Toumani Diakité	(Latvia) Daugavpils	Transfer	€200,000	
5 September 2025	DF	(France) Ange N'Guessan	(Italy) Torino	Transfer	€1,000,000	
8 September 2025	FW	(Czech Republic) Daniel Rus	(Czech Republic) Sparta Prague B	Loan	Undisclosed	
31 December 2025	MF	(Czech Republic) Milan Lexa	(Czech Republic) Pardubice	Loan return	—N/a	
31 December 2025	DF	(Czech Republic) Dominik Mašek	(Czech Republic) Pardubice	Loan return	—N/a	
16 January 2026	DF	(Bosnia and Herzegovina) Haris Berbić	(Bosnia and Herzegovina) BSK Banja Luka	Transfer	€500,000	
16 January 2026	MF	(Czech Republic) Vojtěch Sychra	(Czech Republic) Pardubice	Transfer	Undisclosed	
16 January 2026	DF	(Togo) Augustin Drakpe	(Netherlands) Dordrecht	Transfer	Undisclosed	
16 January 2026	2 February 2026	GK	(El Salvador) Dominik Kúdelčík	(Czech Republic) Vlašim	Undisclosed	

Total spending: ▼€2.4M

=== Out ===
Date	Pos.	Player	To	Type	Fee	Ref.
30 June 2025	GK	(Slovakia) Ivan Krajčírik	(Poland) Widzew Łódź	End of loan		
30 June 2025	MF	(Czech Republic) Lukáš Masopust	(Czech Republic) Slavia Prague	End of loan		
1 July 2025	FW	(Czech Republic) Michael Rabušic	Retired			
1 July 2025	MF	(Equatorial Guinea) Santiago Eneme	(Czech Republic) Sparta Prague	Transfer	€2,000,000	
1 July 2025	MF	(Czech Republic) Denis Višinský	(Czech Republic) Viktoria Plzeň	Transfer	Free	
1 July 2025	MF	(Czech Republic) Christian Frýdek	(Czech Republic) Baník Ostrava	Transfer	Free	
1 July 2025	DF	(Greece) Marios Pourzitidis	(Czech Republic) Dukla Prague	Transfer	Free	
1 July 2025	MF	(Czech Republic) Tomas Polyak	(Czech Republic) Silon Táborsko	Transfer	Undisclosed	
14 July 2025	DF	(Czech Republic) Dominik Mašek	(Czech Republic) Pardubice	Loan	Undisclosed	
14 July 2025	MF	(Czech Republic) Milan Lexa	(Czech Republic) Pardubice	Loan	Undisclosed	
17 July 2025	FW	(Slovakia) Lubomir Tupta	(Greece) AEL	Transfer	Undisclosed	
18 July 2025	MF	(Czech Republic) Hynek Hruška	(Czech Republic) Vlašim	Loan	Undisclosed	
31 July 2025	DF	(Netherlands) Olaf Kok	(Netherlands) Spakenburg	Transfer	Undisclosed	
20 August 2025	FW	(Ghana) Benjamin Nyarko	(Czech Republic) Teplice	Loan	Undisclosed	
21 August 2025	MF	(Ukraine) Ivan Varfolomeyev	(England) Lincoln City	Transfer	€800,000	
2 September 2025	MF	(Nigeria) Ahmad Ghali	(Czech Republic) Sigma Olomouc	Transfer	€2,000,000	
4 September 2025	DF	(France) Ange N'Guessan	(Italy) Torino	End of loan		
16 January 2026	MF	(Czech Republic) Michal Hlavatý	(Czech Republic) Pardubice	Transfer	€800,000	
23 January 2026	GK	(Czech Republic) Hugo Jan Backovsky	(Czech Republic) Dukla Prague	Transfer	Undisclosed	
27 January 2026	DF	(Czech Republic) Dominik Plechatý	(Czech Republic) Artis Brno	Transfer	€620,000	
12 February 2026	DF	(Czech Republic) Dominik Mašek	(El Salvador) Ružomberok	Loan	Undisclosed	

Total income: ▲€6.22M
Balance: ▲€3.82M

== Pre-season and friendlies ==
Win Draw Loss Fixtures

4 July 2025 Friendly	Slovan Liberec	4-1	U Cluj	Ansfelden
11:30 CEST	Letenay 20'; Mikula (yellow card) 36'; Lexa 41'; Mahmić (yellow card) 44'; Soliu 55'; Vojtěch Stránský 78'	Report	Codrea 25'	Stadium: Sportarena Ansfelden

7 July 2025 Friendly	Slovan Liberec	0-1	Hartberg	Liberec
10:00 CEST		Report	Hoffmann 10'	Stadium: Stadion u Nisy

11 July 2025 Friendly	1860 Munich	0-1	Slovan Liberec	Ulrichsberg
11:00 CEST		Report	Mašek 82'	Stadium: DREIHANS Arena

10 January 2026 Friendly	Slovan Liberec	0-1	Fortuna Düsseldorf	Estepona
8:00 CET	Mahmić 58'	Report	Daland 80'; Anhari 87'; Affo 89'	Stadium: Atalya Football Center

15 January 2026 Friendly	Puskás Akadémia	0-1	Slovan Liberec	Estepona
10:00 CET		Report	Mašek 34'	Stadium: Atalya Football Center

19 January 2026 Friendly	Slovan Liberec	1-1	Hammarby	Estepona
9:30 CET	Diakité (yellow card) 35'; Mahmić 47' (pen.); Juliš (yellow card) 79'	Report	Abraham 23' (pen.), (yellow card) 27'; Okeke (yellow card) 41'	Stadium: Atalya Football Center

23 January 2026 Friendly	Slovan Liberec	3-2	CF Montréal	Estepona
6:00 CET	Stránský 7'; Mahmić 61'; Krollis 86'	Report	Synchuk 42'; Ibrahim 73'	Stadium: Atalya Football Center

27 March 2026 Friendly	Pardubice	1-2	Slovan Liberec	Pardubice
9:00 CET	Tanko 7'; Šimek (yellow card) 72'; Noslin (yellow card) 72'	Report	Mikula (yellow card) 12', (goal) 27'; Soliu 66'	Stadium: Pod Vinicí; Referee: Vojtěch Opočenský

27 June 2026 Friendly	Slovan Liberec	2-0	Ústí nad Labem
5:00 CEST	Hodouš 55'; Mašek 81'	Report

== Competitions ==
=== Overall record ===
Competition	First match	Last match	Starting round	Final position	Record							
Competition	First match	Last match	Starting round	Final position	Pld	W	D	L	GF	GA	GD	Win %
Czech First League	20 July 2025	24 May 2026	Matchday 1	6th	35	12	10	13	45	39	+6	34.29
Czech Cup	27 August 2025	30 September 2026	Second round	Third Round	2	1	0	1	7	1	+6	50.00
Total					37	13	10	14	52	40	+12	35.14

Source: Soccerway

=== Czech First League ===
==== Regular season ====
===== League table =====
Pos	Team	Pld	W	D	L	GF	GA	GD	Pts	Qualification or relegation
4	Jablonec	30	15	6	9	41	33	+8	51	Qualification for the championship group
5	Hradec Králové	30	14	7	9	43	34	+9	49	Qualification for the championship group
6	Slovan Liberec	30	12	10	8	43	30	+13	46	Qualification for the championship group
7	Sigma Olomouc	30	12	7	11	34	34	0	43	Qualification for the middle group
8	Pardubice	30	11	8	11	39	46	−7	41	Qualification for the middle group

Updated to match(es) played on unknown. Source: Chance Liga
Rules for classification: 1) Points; 2) Head-to-head points; 3) Head-to-head goal difference; 4) Head-to-head goals scored; 5) Goal difference; 6) Goals scored; 7) Fair-play ranking; 8) Draw.

</onlyinclude>

===== Results summary =====
Overall								Home						Away					
Pld	W	D	L	GF	GA	GD	Pts	W	D	L	GF	GA	GD	W	D	L	GF	GA	GD
30	12	10	8	43	30	+13	46	7	5	3	19	10	+9	5	5	5	24	20	+4

Last updated: 24 May 2026.
Source: Chance Liga

===== Results by round =====
Round	1	2	3	4	5	6	7	8	9	10	11	12	13	14	15	16	17	18	19	20	21	22	23	24	25	26	27	28	29	30
Ground	A	H	A	H	H	A	H	A	H	A	H	A	H	A	H	A	H	A	A	H	A	H	A	H	A	H	H	A	H	A
Result	D	W	L	W	L	L	D	W	D	W	D	D	L	W	W	W	W	D	D	W	L	W	L	L	D	D	W	L	D	W
Position	7	5	9	7	8	9	9	8	9	7	7	7	8	8	6	5	4	4	6	5	5	5	5	5	6	6	5	5	6	6

Updated to match(es) played on 24 May 2026. Source: Chance Liga
A = Away; H = Home; W = Win; D = Draw; L = Loss

===== Matches =====
Win Draw Loss Fixtures

20 July 2025 1	Mladá Boleslav	3-3	Slovan Liberec	Mladá Boleslav
11:00 CEST	Pech 14'; Macek 49'; Ševčík 62', (yellow card) 71'	Report	Krollis 16'; Koželuh (yellow card) 31'; Ghali (yellow card) 34'; Hodouš (yellow card) 59'; Hlavatý 68' (pen.); Mašek 89'	Stadium: Lokotrans Aréna; Attendance: 3,364; Referee: Lukáš Nehasil

27 July 2025 2	Slovan Liberec	2-1	Pardubice	Liberec
9:00 CEST	Ghali 47'; Letenay 78'	Report	Tanko (yellow card) 27'; Patrák 74'	Stadium: Stadion u Nisy; Attendance: 4,143; Referee: Marek Radina

2 August 2025 3	Sigma Olomouc	2-1	Slovan Liberec	Olomouc
14:00 CEST	Tijani 65'; Šíp 90+4'	Report	Soliu 74'; Varfolomeyev (yellow card) 90+3'; Mahmić (yellow card) 90+5'	Stadium: Andrův stadion Attendance: 4,542; Referee: Karel Rouček

9 August 2025 4	Slovan Liberec	2-0	Dukla Prague	Liberec
11:00 CEST	Juliš 30'; Hodouš (yellow card) 44'; Hlavatý (yellow card) 49'; Gabriel 59'	Report	Tijani (yellow card) 57'; Kozma (yellow card) 79'	Stadium: Stadion u Nisy; Attendance: 3,021; Referee: Stanislav Volek

17 August 2025 5	Slovan Liberec	0-2	Sparta Prague	Liberec
14:00 CEST	Kayondo (red card) 31'; Masopust (yellow card) 46'; Kovac (yellow card) 60'; Hlavatý (yellow card) 61'	Report	Kadeřábek (yellow card) 10'; Haraslín (yellow card) 20'; Ryneš (yellow card) 38'; Birmančević 49'; Kuchta (yellow card) 61'	Stadium: Stadion u Nisy; Attendance: 9,120; Referee: Jan Všetečka

23 August 2025 6	Zlín	1-0	Slovan Liberec	Zlín
11:00 CEST	Fukala (yellow card) 31'; Kalabiška 42' (pen.); Kopečný (yellow card) 55'	Report	Hlavatý (yellow card) 41'; Hodouš (yellow card) 78'	Stadium: Letná Stadion; Attendance: 3,609; Referee: Dominik Starý

31 August 2025 7	Slovan Liberec	1-1	Viktoria Plzeň	Liberec
9:00 CEST	Koželuh (yellow card) 11'; Gabriel 65'; Masopust (yellow card) 85'	Report	Ladra (yellow card) 13', (goal) 28'; Marković (yellow card) 47'; Paluska (yellow card) 89'	Stadium: Stadion u Nisy; Attendance: 4,216; Referee: Karel Rouček

13 September 2025 8	Baník Ostrava	0-2	Slovan Liberec	Ostrava
9:00 CEST	Pojezný (yellow card) 27'; Owusu (yellow card) 79' (yellow-red card) 90+2'	Report	Mašek 2', (yellow card) 42'; Mahmić 19', (yellow card) 43'; Mikula (yellow card) 60'; Koželuh (yellow card) 65'	Stadium: Městský stadion Attendance: 7,637; Referee: Marek Radina

21 September 2025 9	Slovan Liberec	1-1	Slavia Prague	Liberec
9:30 CEST	Hodouš 14'; Koželuh (yellow card) 20'; N'Guessan (yellow card) 58'; Kayondo (yellow card) 90+7'	Report	Chaloupek (yellow card) 9'; Zmrzlý (yellow card) 70'; Kušej (yellow card) 79', (goal) 87'	Stadium: Stadion u Nisy; Attendance: 8,062; Referee: Jan Všetečka

27 September 2025 10	Hradec Králové	2-3	Slovan Liberec	Hradec Králové
12:00 CEST	Petrášek 11'; Cihak (yellow card) 20'; Vlkanova 40', (yellow card) 47'; Mihálik (yellow card) 45+1'; Kayondo (yellow card) 90+7'	Report	Mašek 17', (yellow card) 39'; Hodouš (yellow card) 57'; Mahmić 65'; Mikula 89'; Pešl (yellow card) 90+2'	Stadium: Malšovická aréna Attendance: 5,909; Referee: Dominik Starý

4 October 2025 11	Slovan Liberec	0-0	Bohemians 1905	Liberec
12:00 CEST		Report	Vondra (yellow card) 13'; Kadlec (yellow card) 70'; Okeke (yellow card) 82'	Stadium: Stadion u Nisy; Attendance: 2,580; Referee: Lukáš Nehasil

18 October 2025 12	Teplice	1-1	Slovan Liberec	Teplice
9:00 CEST	Švanda (yellow card) 26'; Kozák (yellow card) 45+4'; Bílek 54' (pen.); Auta (yellow card) 87'	Report	Krollis (yellow card) 21'; N'Guessan (yellow card) 42'; Soliu 89'	Stadium: Na Stínadlech; Attendance: 2,782; Referee: Marek Radina

25 October 2025 13	Slovan Liberec	0-2	Jablonec	Liberec
12:00 CEST	Hlavatý (yellow card) 22'; Hodouš (yellow card) 29'; Mikula (yellow card) 39'; Mašek (yellow card) 61'	Report	Souček (yellow card) 29'; Polidar (yellow card) 29'; Tekijaški (yellow card) 44'; Chanturishvili 65'; Jawo 68'	Stadium: Stadion u Nisy; Attendance: 4,587; Referee: Jan Beneš

1 November 2025 14	Slovácko	0-3	Slovan Liberec	Uherské Hradiště
12:00 CET	Šviderský (yellow card) 52'; Medved (yellow card) 84'; Petržela (yellow card) 90+2'	Report	Mahmić (yellow card) 2', (goal) 68'; Krollis 15'; Kayondo (yellow card) 20'; N'Guessan (yellow card) 58'; Letenay 77'	Stadium: Městský fotbalový stadion Miroslava Valenty; Attendance: 1,978; Referee: Stanislav Volek

9 November 2025 15	Slovan Liberec	6-0	Karviná	Liberec
7:00 CET	Krollis 9'; Koželuh (yellow card) 26'; Plechatý (yellow card) 26'; Mahmić 29', 43'; Stránský 39'; Mašek 83', 90+2'	Report	Traoré (red card) 13'	Stadium: Stadion u Nisy; Attendance: 2,206; Referee: Jan Machálek

22 November 2025 16	Pardubice	0-4	Slovan Liberec	Pardubice
9:00 CET	Solil (yellow card) 47'; Šimek (yellow card) 55'; Tredl (yellow card) 68'; Krobot (yellow card) 73'	Report	Soliu 27'; Dulay 40'; Mahmić (yellow card) 46'; Mašek 68'; Krollis (yellow card) 71'; Plechatý 80'; Koubek (yellow card) 90+2'	Stadium: Stadion Arnošta Košťála; Attendance: 1,748; Referee: Stanislav Volek

30 November 2025 17	Slovan Liberec	1-0	Sigma Olomouc	Liberec
9:30 CET	Kayondo (yellow card) 30'; Icha 83'	Report	Beran (yellow card) 12'; Huk (yellow card) 63'; Sylla (yellow card) 70'; Sláma (yellow card) 83'	Stadium: Stadion u Nisy; Attendance: 2,233; Referee: Jan Beneš

6 December 2025 18	Dukla Prague	1-1	Slovan Liberec	Prague
9:00 CET	Šehović (yellow card) 18'; Kroupa 40'; Jedlička (yellow card) 68'; Černák (yellow card) 79'	Report	Krollis (yellow card) 11', (goal) 90'; Plechatý (yellow card) 13'; Soliu (yellow card) 37'	Stadium: Stadion Juliska; Attendance: 2,012; Referee: Daniel Vokoun

14 December 2025 19	Sparta Prague	2-2	Slovan Liberec	Prague
12:30 CET	N'Guessan 42' (o.g.); Mercado (yellow card) 48'; Sørensen 55'; Priske (yellow card) 78'; Kuchta 85', (yellow card) 90+4'	Report	Icha (yellow card) 29'; Krollis 34'; Kayondo (yellow card) 45+2' (yellow-red card) 90+4'; Mašek (yellow card) 77'; Kováč (yellow card) 78'; Letenay 79'; N'Guessan (yellow card) 87'	Stadium: epet ARENA; Attendance: 16,154; Referee: Dalibor Černý

1 February 2026 20	Slovan Liberec	2-0	Zlín	Liberec
9:30 CET	Soliu 22'; Stránský 59', (yellow card) 89'	Report	Kolář (yellow card) 17'; Kanu (yellow card) 51'	Stadium: Stadion u Nisy; Attendance: 2,064; Referee: Ondřej Berka

8 February 2026 21	Viktoria Plzeň	3-1	Slovan Liberec	Plzeň
12:30 CET	Krčík 8'; Souaré 43'; Višinský 76'; Doski (yellow card) 78'	Report	Kayondo (yellow card) 5'; Mašek 48'	Stadium: Doosan Arena; Attendance: 7,712; Referee: Marek Radina

15 February 2026 22	Slovan Liberec	1-0	Baník Ostrava	Liberec
9:30 CET	Mahmić 49'; Krollis (yellow card) 63'; Mašek (yellow card) 68'; Koubek (yellow card) 90+3'	Report	Gning (yellow card) 28'; Planka (yellow card) 38'; Pojezný (yellow card) 65'; Kante (yellow card) 72'	Stadium: Stadion u Nisy; Attendance: 2,746; Referee: Jan Beneš

21 February 2026 23	Slavia Prague	1-0	Slovan Liberec	Prague
12:00 CET	Holeš (yellow card) 26'; Chorý (yellow card) 30', (goal) 59' (pen.); Chaloupek (yellow card) 79'; Trpišovský (yellow card) 89'; Sadílek (yellow card) 90+6'	Report	Kayondo (yellow card) 21'; Kováč (yellow card) 90+6'	Stadium: Fortuna Arena; Attendance: 18,036; Referee: Ondřej Pechanec

28 February 2026 24	Slovan Liberec	0-1	Hradec Králové	Liberec
9:00 CET	Letenay (yellow card) 90+3'; Rus (yellow card) 90+1'	Report	Pilař 38'; Horejš (yellow card) 51'; Mihálik (yellow card) 90+1'	Stadium: Stadion u Nisy; Attendance: 3,579; Referee: Ondřej Berka

7 March 2026 25	Bohemians 1905	0-0	Slovan Liberec	Prague
9:00 CET	Smrž (yellow card) 37'; Matoušek (yellow card) 61' (yellow-red card) 64'	Report	N'Guessan (yellow card) 37'; Soliu (yellow card) 55' (yellow-red card) 82'; Mašek (yellow card) 67'	Stadium: Ďolíček; Attendance: 5,872; Referee: Dalibor Černý

15 March 2026 26	Slovan Liberec	1-1	Teplice	Liberec
9:00 CET	Špatenka (yellow card) 23'; Krollis (yellow card) 33'; Stránský (yellow card) 43'; Rus 89' (pen.)	Report	Fully (yellow card) 30' (yellow-red card) 88'; Náprstek (yellow card) 35'; Jukl (yellow card) 40'; Mareček (yellow card) 42'; Bílek (yellow card) 43'; Svatek 74'	Stadium: Stadion u Nisy; Attendance: 2,630; Referee: Stanislav Volek

4 April 2026 27	Slovan Liberec	2-1	Slovácko	Liberec
9:00 CEST	Krollis 36', (yellow card) 68'; Diakité 65', (yellow card) 86'; Dulay (yellow card) 74'	Report	Havlík 39'; Ndefe (yellow card) 56'	Stadium: Stadion u Nisy; Attendance: 2,608; Referee: Ondřej Berka

12 April 2026 28	Karviná	3-1	Slovan Liberec	Karviná
7:00 CEST	Vinicius 7'; Křišťan (yellow card) 20'; Milić (yellow card) 22'; Skyba (yellow card) 25'; Traoré 67'; Kačor 77', (yellow card) 87'	Report	Krollis 4'; Diakité (yellow card) 33' (yellow-red card) 61'; Drakpe (yellow card) 42'; Kayondo (yellow card) 45+1'	Stadium: Městský stadion Attendance: 1,742; Referee: Daniel Vokou

18 April 2026 29	Slovan Liberec	0-0	Mladá Boleslav	Liberec
9:00 CEST	Kayondo (yellow card) 19'; Soliu (yellow card) 31'	Report	Kabongo (yellow card) 38'; Macek (yellow card) 90+4'	Stadium: Stadion u Nisy; Attendance: 3,160; Referee: Karel Rouček

25 April 2026 30	Jablonec	1-2	Slovan Liberec	Jablonec nad Nisou
10:00 CEST	Sobol 45'; Chanturishvili (yellow card) 45+1'; Chramosta 67' (pen.); Jawo (yellow card) 88'	Report	Diakité 31'; Lexa (yellow card) 55'; Krollis 58'; Hodouš (yellow card) 77'; Mikula (yellow card) 87'; Soliu (yellow card) 90+6'	Stadium: Stadion Střelnice; Attendance: 5,250; Referee: Lukáš Nehasil

==== Championship group ====
===== League table =====
Pos	Team	Pld	W	D	L	GF	GA	GD	Pts	Qualification or relegation
1	Slavia Prague (C)	35	24	8	3	74	31	+43	80	Qualification for the Champions League league phase
2	Sparta Prague	35	23	7	5	69	34	+35	76	Qualification for the Champions League third qualifying round
3	Viktoria Plzeň	35	18	9	8	60	38	+22	63	Qualification for the Europa League play-off round
4	Hradec Králové	35	16	8	11	50	41	+9	56	Qualification for the Europa League second qualifying round
5	Jablonec	35	16	7	12	45	47	−2	55	Qualification for the Conference League second qualifying round
6	Slovan Liberec	35	12	10	13	45	39	+6	46	

Source: Chance Liga
Rules for classification: 1) Total points; 2) Points earned in regular season; 3) Head-to-head points (regular season); 4) Head-to-head goal difference (regular season); 5) Head-to-head goals scored (regular season); 5) Goal difference (all matches); 6) Goals scored (all matches); 7) Fair-play ranking; 8) Draw.
(C) Champions

===== Results summary =====
Overall								Home						Away					
Pld	W	D	L	GF	GA	GD	Pts	W	D	L	GF	GA	GD	W	D	L	GF	GA	GD
5	0	0	5	2	9	−7	0	0	0	2	1	4	−3	0	0	3	1	5	−4

Last updated: 24 May 2026.
Source: Chance Liga

===== Results by round =====
Round	1	2	3	4	5
Ground	H	A	A	H	A
Result	L	L	L	L	L
Position	6	6	6	6	6

Updated to match(es) played on 24 May 2026. Source: Chance Liga
A = Away; H = Home; W = Win; D = Draw; L = Loss

===== Results =====
2 May 2026 31	Slovan Liberec	1-2	Slavia Prague	Liberec
12:00 CEST	Mahmić (yellow card) 34', (goal) 50'; Drakpe (yellow card) 45+3' (yellow-red card) 83'; Stránský (yellow card) 78'; N'Guessan (yellow card) 90'; Krollis (yellow card) 90+4'; Špatenka (yellow card) 90+6'	Report	Ogbu 18'; Jurásek 45+4'; Vlček (yellow card) 90+12'	Stadium: Stadion u Nisy; Attendance: 8,316; Referee: Jakub Wulkan

9 May 2026 32	Viktoria Plzeň	2-0	Slovan Liberec	Plzeň
10:00 CEST	Touré 13'; Krčík (yellow card) 16'; Kadlec (yellow card) 25'; Sojka 67'	Report	Diakité (yellow card) 34'; Masopust (yellow card) 39'; Mahmić (yellow card) 65'	Stadium: Doosan Arena; Attendance: 8,144; Referee: Stanislav Volek

13 May 2026 33	Hradec Králové	1-0	Slovan Liberec	Hradec Králové
11:30 CEST	Regža (yellow card) 22'; Suchomel 33', (yellow card) 54'	Report	Soliu (yellow card) 64'; N'Guessan (yellow card) 79'	Stadium: Malšovická aréna Attendance: 6,189; Referee: Ondřej Berka

17 May 2026 34	Slovan Liberec	0-2	Sparta Prague	Liberec
11:00 CEST	Krollis (yellow card) 60'; Mašek (yellow card) 85'; Kayondo (yellow card) 90+2' (yellow-red card) 90+5'	Report	Mercado 80'; Haraslín 86'	Stadium: Stadion u Nisy; Attendance: 6,533; Referee: Stanislav Volek

24 May 2026 35	Jablonec	2-1	Slovan Liberec	Jablonec nad Nisou
8:00 CEST	Zorvan 38'; Nebyla (yellow card) 44'; Souček (yellow card) 70'; Mihelak (yellow card) 90+4'	Report	Rýzek (red card) 15'; Chanturishvili 72' (o.g.)	Stadium: Stadion Střelnice; Attendance: 3,106; Referee: Vojtěch Opočenský

=== Czech Cup ===
27 August 2025 Second Round	Brandys n. Labem	0-6	Slovan Liberec	Brandýs nad Labem
11:30 CEST	Folwarczny (yellow card) 39'; Gombáš (yellow card) 64'	Report	Letenay 6'; Mahmić 15'; Kayondo (yellow card) 26', (goal) 44'; Špatenka 65'; Masopust 69' (pen.); Mašek (yellow card) 73'; Gabriel 77'	Stadium: Spořilov; Attendance: 1,885; Referee: Matej Kubečka

30 September 2025 Third Round	Artis Brno	1-1 (a.e.t.) (6-5 p)	Slovan Liberec	Brno
11:00 CEST	Lutonský 29', (yellow card) 55'; Otrísal (yellow card) 31' (yellow-red card) 44'	Report	Soliu 17'; Stránský (yellow card) 48'; Kayondo (yellow card) 67'	Stadium: ShipEx Arena; Attendance: 1,455; Referee: Ondřej Berka
	Penalties
	Vukadinović (penalty scored); Lutonský (penalty missed); Kosek (penalty scored); Harazim (penalty scored); Adediran (penalty scored); Samek (penalty scored); Čoudek (penalty scored)		(penalty scored) Hlavatý; (penalty scored) Krollis; (penalty scored) Špatenka; (penalty missed) Mahmić; (penalty scored) Mašek; (penalty scored) Icha; (penalty missed) Hodouš
