= 2026–27 Çorum F.K. season =

Çorum F.K.
2026–27 season
- Chairman: Savaş Balçık
- Manager: Uğur Uçar
- Stadium: Çorum City Stadium
- Süper Lig: 7th
- Biggest win: Samsunspor 1–5 Çorum
- Biggest defeat: Beşiktaş 6–2 Çorum

The 2026–27 season is the 30th season in the history of Çorum FK and its first-ever season in the Turkish top flight. The club is also scheduled to compete in the Turkish Cup.

== Transfers ==
=== In ===
Pos.	Player	Transferred from	Fee	Date	Source
DF	(Croatia) Hrvoje Smolčić	(Germany) Eintracht Frankfurt	Undisclosed	1 July 2026	
MF	(Iraq) Hasan Abdulkareem	(Iraq) Al-Zawraa	Undisclosed	2 July 2026	
DF	(Turkey) Gökhan Sazdağı	(Turkey) Beşiktaş	Undisclosed	4 July 2026	
DF	(Turkey) Serdar Saatçı	(Turkey) Trabzonspor	Undisclosed	7 July 2026	
GK	(Turkey) Erhan Erentürk	(Turkey) Gençlerbirliği	Free	8 July 2026	
MF	(Turkey) Emircan Gürlük	(Russia) Orenburg	Free	8 July 2026	
GK	(Brazil) Marcos Felipe	(Turkey) Eyüpspor	Undisclosed	10 July 2026	
DF	(Turkey) Hüseyin Bulut	(Turkey) Ankara Keçiörengücü	Undisclosed	11 July 2026	
DF	(Romania) Andrei Borza	(Romania) Rapid București	Undisclosed	24 July 2026	
DF	(Portugal) Alexandre Penetra	(Netherlands) AZ Alkmaar	Loan	3 August 2026	
FW	(Venezuela) Jesús Ramírez	(Portugal) Nacional	Undisclosed	7 August 2026	
MF	(Norway) Markus Karlsbakk	(Norway) Lillestrøm	Undisclosed	8 August 2026	
MF	(Turkey) Berat Özdemir	(Turkey) İstanbul Başakşehir	Undisclosed	9 August 2026	
MF	(Greece) Alexandros Kyziridis	(Scotland) Heart of Midlothian	Undisclosed	10 August 2026	
MF	(Ivory Coast) Mohamed Diomande	(Scotland) Rangers	Undisclosed	12 August 2026	
MF	(Turkey) Göktan Gürpüz	(Turkey) Trabzonspor	Loan	27 August 2026	
MF	(Turkey) Cengiz Ünder	(Turkey) Fenerbahçe	Free	28 August 2026	
MF	(Bosnia and Herzegovina) Ermin Mahmić	(Czech Republic) Slovan Liberec	Undisclosed	30 August 2026	
FW	(Germany) Youssoufa Moukoko	(Denmark) Copenhagen	Loan	1 September 2026	
DF	(Turkey) Çağlar Söyüncü	(Turkey) Fenerbahçe	Free	4 September 2026	

=== Out ===
Pos.	Player	Transferred to	Fee	Date	Source
MF	(Ghana) Ibrahim Zubairu	(Serbia) Partizan	Loan return	30 June 2026	
MF	(Turkey) Yusuf Erdoğan	(Turkey) Esenler Erokspor		1 July 2026	
DF	(Turkey) Kerem Kalafat	(Turkey) Pendikspor	Free	7 July 2026	
DF	(Ghana) Joseph Attamah	(Turkey) Sarıyer	Contract terminated	9 July 2026	
FW	(Nigeria) Emeka Eze	(Turkey) Sarıyer	Contract terminated	9 July 2026	
MF	(Paraguay) Braian Samudio	(Turkey) Esenler Erokspor	Contract terminated	9 July 2026	
GK	(Bosnia and Herzegovina) Ibrahim Šehić	(Turkey) Sarıyer	Free	15 July 2026	
DF	(Turkey) Erkan Kaş	(Turkey) Esenler Erokspor	Contract terminated	23 July 2026	
MF	(Portugal) Pedrinho	(Turkey) Antalyaspor	Free	30 July 2026	
MF	(Turkey) Ferhat Yazgan	(Turkey) Esenler Erokspor	Contract terminated	13 August 2026	
FW	(Senegal) Mame Thiam	(Turkey) Sarıyer	Undisclosed	19 August 2026	
MF	(Turkey) Burak Çoban	(Turkey) Esenler Erokspor	Contract terminated	20 August 2026	
DF	(Turkey) Sinan Osmanoğlu	(Turkey) Vanspor	Contract terminated	20 August 2026	
MF	(Iraq) Hasan Abdulkareem	(Iraq) Al-Zawraa	Loan	26 August 2026	
DF	(Turkey) Serdar Gürler	(Turkey) Iğdır	Contract terminated	4 September 2026	

== Friendlies ==
23 July 2026	Bandırmaspor	0–0	Çorum

25 July 2026	KF Tirana (Albania)	0–0	Çorum

4 August 2026	Gençlerbirliği	0–0	Çorum

== Competitions ==
=== Overall record ===
Competition	First match	Last match	Starting round	Record							
Competition	First match	Last match	Starting round	Pld	W	D	L	GF	GA	GD	Win %
Süper Lig	14 August 2026		Matchday 1	5	2	1	2	12	10	+2	40.00
Turkish Cup				0	0	0	0	0	0	+0	—
Total				5	2	1	2	12	10	+2	40.00

Last updated: 12 September 2026
Source: Competitions

=== Süper Lig ===
Pos	Team	Pld	W	D	L	GF	GA	GD	Pts
5	Alanyaspor	5	2	2	1	6	5	+1	8
6	Trabzonspor	5	2	1	2	9	5	+4	7
7	Çorum	5	2	1	2	12	10	+2	7
8	Gaziantep	4	2	1	1	7	5	+2	7
9	Amedspor	4	2	1	1	7	5	+2	7

Updated to match(es) played on 12 September 2026. Source: Süper Lig
Rules for classification: 1) Points; 2) Head-to-head points; 3) Head-to-head goal difference; 4) Head-to-head goals scored; 5) Goal difference; 6) Goals scored; 7) Play-off.
(Note: Head-to-head record is used only after all the matches between the teams in question have been played)

==== Results summary ====
Overall								Home						Away					
Pld	W	D	L	GF	GA	GD	Pts	W	D	L	GF	GA	GD	W	D	L	GF	GA	GD
5	2	1	2	12	10	+2	7	1	0	1	3	1	+2	1	1	1	9	9	0

Last updated: 12 September 2026.

==== Results by round ====
Round	1	2	3	4	5
Ground	A	H	A	H	A
Result	D	L	L	W	W
Position					

Updated to match(es) played on 12 September 2026. Source:
A = Away; H = Home; W = Win; D = Draw; L = Loss

==== Matches ====
14 August 2026 1	Galatasaray	2–2	Çorum	Istanbul
21:30	Osimhen 53', 90'		Kyziridis 59', (red card) 70'; Ramírez 61'	Stadium: Rams Park; Referee: Batuhan Kolak

22 August 2026 2	Çorum	0–1	Kasımpaşa	Çorum
19:00			Benedyczak 6'	Stadium: Çorum City Stadium; Referee: Fatih Tokail

31 August 2026 3	Beşiktaş	6–2	Çorum	Istanbul
21:30	Černý 9'; Vlahović 43' (pen.), 59', 66'; Fakılı 73'; Murillo 83'		Diomande 52'; Mahmić 77'	Stadium: Beşiktaş Stadium; Referee: Çağdaş Altay

6 September 2026 4	Çorum	3–0	Eyüpspor	Çorum
17:00	Kyziridis 6'; Borza 27'; Ünder (yellow card) 45'; Mahmić 88'		Costa (yellow card) 45+2'; Anıl Yaşar (yellow card) 58'	Stadium: Çorum City Stadium; Referee: Davut Dakul Çelik

12 September 2026 5	Samsunspor	1–5	Çorum	Samsun
17:00	Tómasson 5'		Ramírez 1', 71'; Ünder 10', 15'; Sazdağı (yellow card) 31'; Kyziridis 69'; Ramadani (yellow card) 81'; Borza (yellow card) 90'	Stadium: Samsun 19 May Stadium; Referee: Ali Şansalan

== Goalscorers ==
Rank	Player	Süper Lig	Turkish Cup	Total
1	(Venezuela) Jesús Ramírez	3	0	3
1	(Greece) Alexandros Kyziridis	3	0	3
3	(Bosnia and Herzegovina) Ermin Mahmić	2	0	2
3	(Turkey) Cengiz Ünder	2	0	2
5	(Romania) Andrei Borza	1	0	1
5	(Ivory Coast) Mohamed Diomande	1	0	1
