= David Da Costa =

David Da Costa may refer to:

- David Da Costa (footballer, born 1986), Swiss football goalkeeper
- David Da Costa (footballer, born 2001), Portuguese football winger for Portland Timbers

== See also ==
- David Costa (disambiguation)
