= Janáček (surname) =

Janáček (feminine: Janáčková) is a Czech surname, literally a diminutive of the given name Jan (given name), the Czech form of John. Notable people with the surname include:

- Grażyna Prokopek-Janáček (born 1977), Polish sprinter
- Jaromír Janáček (born 1995), Czech badminton player
- Jitka Janáčková (born 1973), Czech canoer
- Leoš Janáček (1854–1928), Czech composer
- Liana Janáčková (born 1953), Czech politician
- Libor Janáček (born 1969), Czech footballer
- Štěpán Janáček (born 1977), Czech pole vaulter
- Světlana Janáčková (born 1967), Czech volleyball player
- Zdenka Janáčková (1865–1938), Czech writer; wife of Leoš Janáček

== See also ==
- Viera Janárčeková (1941–2023), Slovak pianist and composer
