= Ivan Varfolomeyev =

Ukrainian footballer (born 2004)

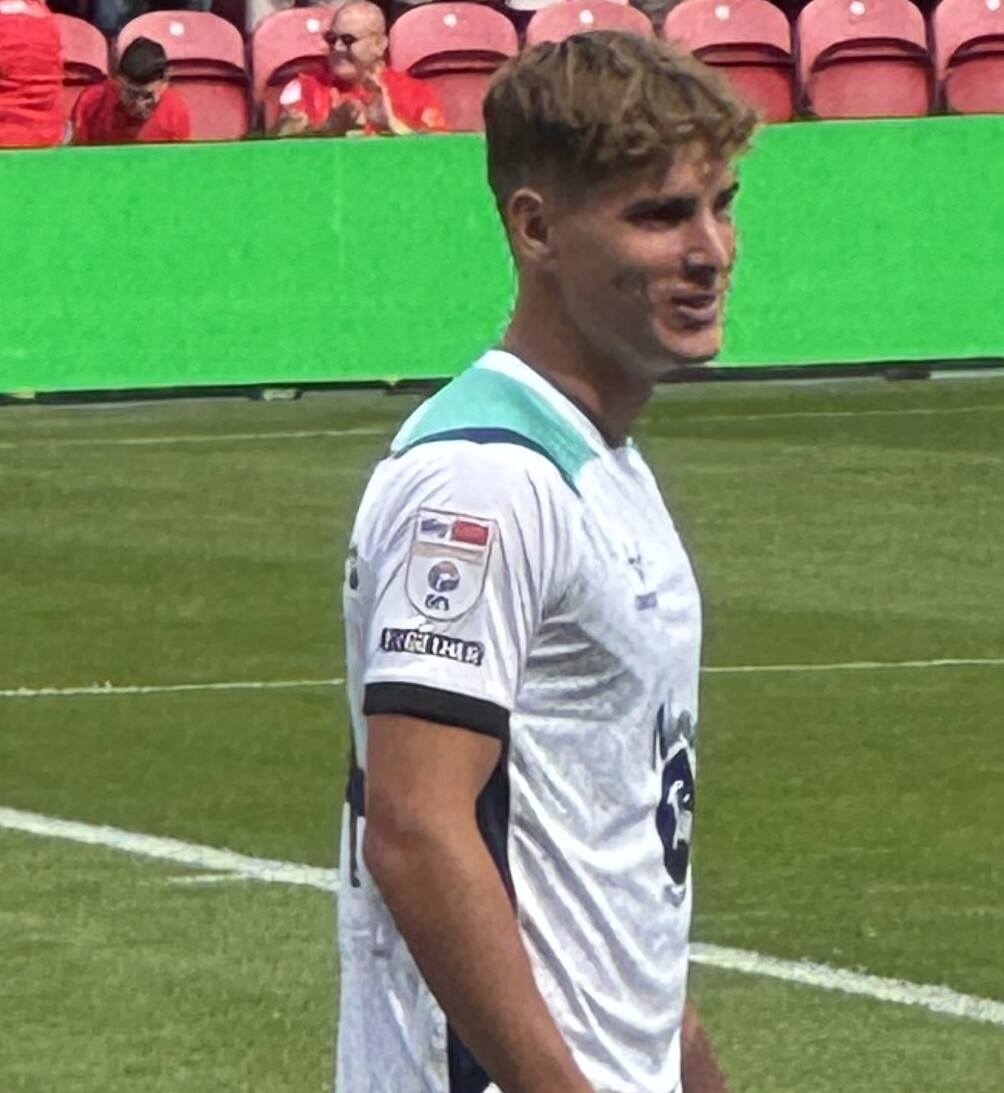
- Ivan Varfolomeev with Lincoln City in 2026

Personal information
- Full name: Ivan Oleksandrovych Varfolomeyev
- Date of birth: 24 March 2004 (age 22)
- Place of birth: Simferopol, AR Crimea, Ukraine
- Height: 5 ft 11 in (1.80 m)
- Position: Defensive midfielder

Team information
- Current team: Lincoln City
- Number: 24

Youth career
- –2014: Tavriya Simferopol
- 2014–2020: Karpaty Lviv

Senior career*
| Years | Team | Apps | (Gls) |
| 2020–2022 | Rukh Lviv | 2 | (0) |
| 2022–2025 | Slovan Liberec | 51 | (2) |
| 2025– | Lincoln City | 42 | (1) |

International career^{‡}
| 2020 | Ukraine U16 | 3 | (0) |
| 2022–2023 | Ukraine U19 | 5 | (1) |
| 2024–2026 | Ukraine U21 | 16 | (0) |
| 2026– | Ukraine | 1 | (0) |
- * Club domestic league appearances and goals as of 14:42, 31 October 2026 (UTC) ‡ National team caps and goals as of 20:52, 5 October 2026 (UTC)

Ivan Varfolomeyev (Ukrainian: Іван Олександрович Варфоломєєв; born 24 March 2004) is a Ukrainian professional footballer who plays as a defensive midfielder for EFL Championship club Lincoln City and the Ukraine national team.

== Career ==
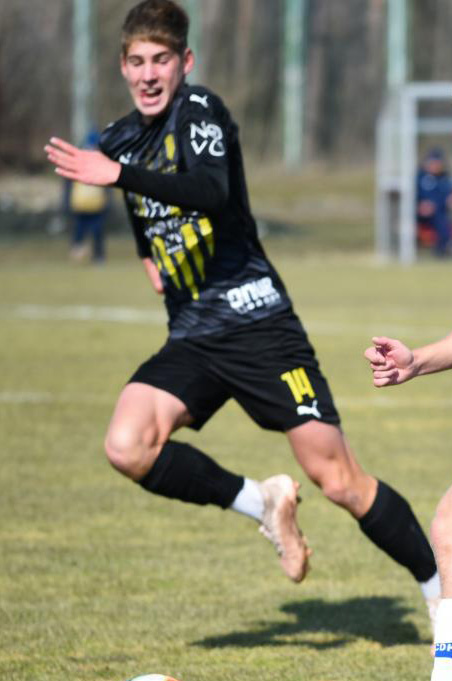
Varfolomeev playing for Rukh Lviv U-19 in 2021

Born in Simferopol, Varfolomeyev is a product of the SC Tavriya Simferopol, where his first trainers were Andriy Cheremysin and Vitaliy Ponomaryov, and Karpaty Lviv youth sportive systems.

In September 2020, he transferred to Rukh Lviv and made his Ukrainian Premier League debut as a second-half substitute against Shakhtar Donetsk on 21 February 2021.

Varfolomeyev joined Czech First League club Slovan Liberec in June 2022. In January 2025, he signed a new contract until the summer of 2028.

On 21 August 2025, Varfolomeyev joined English League One club Lincoln City for an undisclosed fee, believed to be for £350,000 which would surpass the club's previous record fee paid for John Akinde in 2018. He agreed a four-year contract with The Imps, with Slovan Liberec confirming they retained a large share in his next transfer. He made his debut for Lincoln City in the EFL Cup starting the game against Burton Albion on the 26 August 2025. The following game he would make his League One debut coming off the bench in a 1–1 draw against Mansfield Town. He scored his first goal for Lincoln on 17 February 2026, scoring from 25 yards against Northampton Town. He was voted Lincoln City's young player of the season following the end of his debut season.

After his first call up to the Ukraine national team, Varfolomeev signed a new four-year contract at City.

== International career ==
Having played at various age groups for Ukraine, he received his first senior call up in September 2026 for the UEFA Nations League. He made his Ukraine debut against Hungary in October 2026 coming off the bench late on.

== Career statistics ==
=== Club ===
As of 31 October 2026

| Club | Season | League | | | National Cup | | League Cup | | Other | | Total | |
| Club | Season | Division | Apps | Goals | Apps | Goals | Apps | Goals | Apps | Goals | Apps | Goals |
|---|---|---|---|---|---|---|---|---|---|---|---|---|
| Rukh Lviv | 2020–21 | Ukrainian Premier League | 2 | 0 | 0 | 0 | 0 | 0 | 0 | 0 | 2 | 0 |
| Rukh Lviv | 2021–22 | Ukrainian Premier League | 0 | 0 | 1 | 0 | 0 | 0 | 0 | 0 | 1 | 0 |
| Rukh Lviv | Total | | 2 | 0 | 1 | 0 | 0 | 0 | 0 | 0 | 3 | 0 |
| Slovan Liberec | 2022–23 | Czech First League | 10 | 0 | 3 | 2 | 0 | 0 | 4 | 0 | 17 | 2 |
| Slovan Liberec | 2023–24 | Czech First League | 18 | 1 | 2 | 0 | 0 | 0 | 0 | 0 | 20 | 1 |
| Slovan Liberec | 2024–25 | Czech First League | 20 | 1 | 2 | 0 | 0 | 0 | 1 | 0 | 23 | 1 |
| Slovan Liberec | 2025–26 | Czech First League | 3 | 0 | 0 | 0 | 0 | 0 | 0 | 0 | 3 | 0 |
| Slovan Liberec | Total | | 51 | 2 | 7 | 2 | 0 | 0 | 5 | 0 | 63 | 4 |
| Lincoln City | 2025–26 | EFL League One | 31 | 1 | 1 | 0 | 2 | 0 | 2 (Note: Appearances in EFL Trophy) | 0 | 36 | 1 |
| Lincoln City | 2026–27 | EFL Championship | 11 | 0 | 0 | 0 | 2 | 0 | 0 | 0 | 13 | 0 |
| Lincoln City | Total | | 42 | 1 | 1 | 0 | 4 | 0 | 2 | 0 | 49 | 1 |
| Career total | | | 95 | 3 | 9 | 2 | 4 | 0 | 7 | 0 | 115 | 5 |

=== International ===
As of match played 5 October 2026

Appearances and goals by national team and year
| National team | Year | Apps | Goals |
|---|---|---|---|
| Ukraine | 2026 | 1 | 0 |
| Total | | 1 | 0 |

== Honours ==
Lincoln City

- EFL League One: 2025–26
