= Ermin Mahmić =

Bosnian footballer (born 2005)

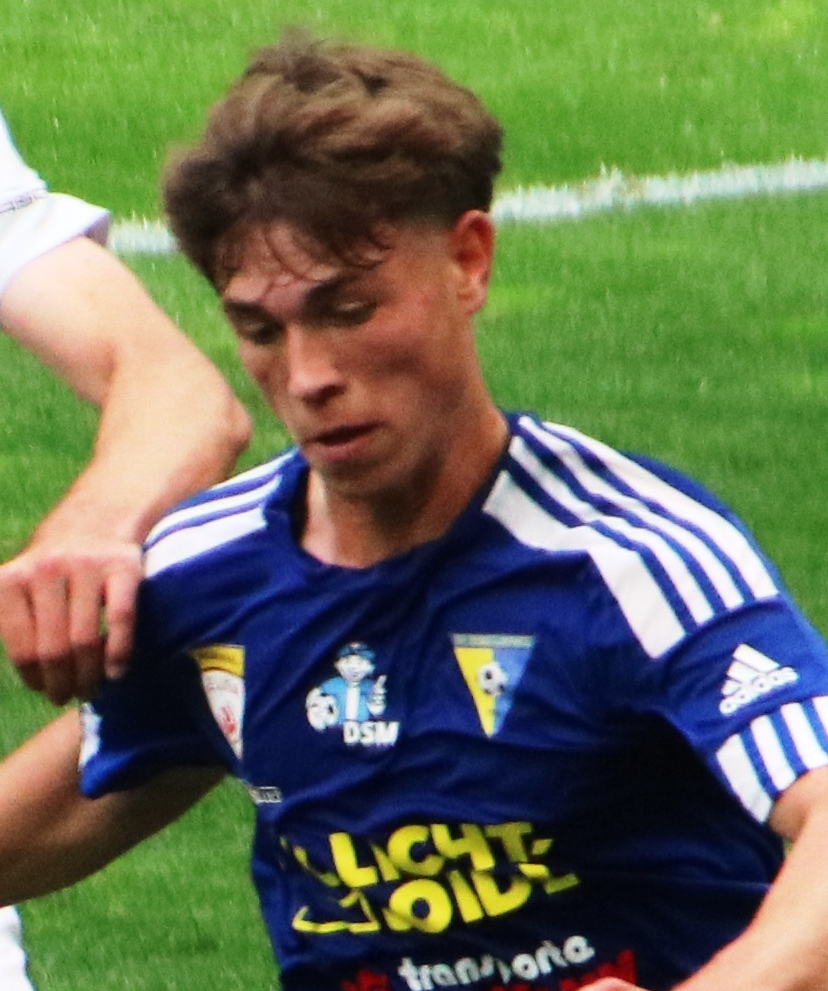
- Mahmić in 2024

Personal information
- Date of birth: 14 March 2005 (age 21)
- Place of birth: Wels, Austria
- Height: 1.82 m (6 ft 0 in)
- Position: Attacking midfielder

Team information
- Current team: Çorum
- Number: 26

Youth career
- 2011–2012: ESV Intersport Wels
- 2012–2015: FC Pasching
- 2015–2019: LASK
- 2019–2023: Rapid Wien

Senior career*
Years	Team	Apps	(Gls)
2023–2025	SV Lafnitz	43	(4)
2025–2026	Slovan Liberec	28	(7)
2026–	Çorum	9	(2)

International career^{‡}
2021–2022	Austria U17	4	(0)
2023	Bosnia and Herzegovina U19	2	(1)
2025–2026	Austria U21	2	(0)
2026–	Bosnia and Herzegovina	11	(3)
- * Club domestic league appearances and goals as of 8 November 2026 ‡ National team caps and goals as of 17 November 2026

Ermin Mahmić (pronounced [ěrmin mâːxmitɕ]; born 14 March 2005) is a professional footballer who plays as an attacking midfielder for Süper Lig club Çorum. Born in Austria, he plays for the Bosnia and Herzegovina national team.

Mahmić started his professional career at SV Lafnitz, before joining Slovan Liberec in 2025. The following year, he was transferred to Çorum.

A former Austrian youth international, Mahmić made his senior international debut for Bosnia and Herzegovina in 2026, earning 11 caps since. He represented the nation at the 2026 FIFA World Cup.

== Club career ==
=== Early career ===
Mahmić started playing football at his hometown club ESV Intersport Wels, which he joined in 2011. The following year, he switched to FC Pasching's youth setup. In 2015, he moved to LASK's youth academy. Four years later, he joined Rapid Wien's youth setup. In July 2023, Mahmić signed with SV Lafnitz. He made his professional debut against SV Stripfing on 20 October at the age of 18. On 23 August 2024, he scored his first professional goal against the same opponent.

In June 2025, he moved to Czech team Slovan Liberec.

In August 2026, he signed with Turkish side Çorum.

== International career ==
After representing Austria at various youth levels, and also Bosnia and Herzegovina at the under-19 level, Mahmić decided to play for Bosnia and Herzegovina at the senior level.

In May 2026, his request to change sports citizenship from Austrian to Bosnian was approved by FIFA. Later that month, he received his first senior call up, for friendly games against North Macedonia and Panama. He debuted against the former on 29 May.

In June 2026, Mahmić was named in Bosnia and Herzegovina's squad for the 2026 FIFA World Cup. He made his tournament debut in the second group match against Switzerland on 18 June and managed to score a goal, his first senior international goal.

== Personal life ==
Mahmić is a practising Muslim; together with international teammates Sead Kolašinac, Amar Memić, Tarik Muharemović, Haris Tabaković, Nail Omerović, Salko Hamzić, Zinedin Smajlović, Nihad Mujakić and Samed Baždar he visited a mosque in Ilidža during the national team's concentration.

== Career statistics ==
=== Club ===
As of match played 8 November 2026

Appearances and goals by club, season and competition
Club	Season	League			National cup (Note: Includes Austrian Cup, Czech Cup)		Continental		Total	
Club	Season	Division	Apps	Goals	Apps	Goals	Apps	Goals	Apps	Goals
SV Lafnitz	2023–24	2. Liga	18	0	0	0	–		18	0
SV Lafnitz	2024–25	2. Liga	25	4	2	1	–		27	5
SV Lafnitz	Total		43	4	2	1	–		45	5
Slovan Liberec	2025–26	Czech First League	28	7	2	1	–		30	8
Çorum	2026–27	Süper Lig	9	2	0	0	–		9	2
Career total			80	13	4	2	–		84	15

=== International ===
As of match played 17 November 2026

Appearances and goals by national team and year
National team	Year	Apps	Goals
Bosnia and Herzegovina
Bosnia and Herzegovina	2026	11	3
Total		11	3

Scores and results list Bosnia and Herzegovina's goal tally first, score column indicates score after each Mahmić goal.

List of international goals scored by Ermin Mahmić
No.	Date	Venue	Cap	Opponent	Score	Result	Competition
1	18 June 2026	SoFi Stadium, Inglewood, United States	3	Switzerland	1–3	1–4	2026 FIFA World Cup
2	24 June 2026	Lumen Field, Seattle, United States	4	Qatar	3–1	3–1	2026 FIFA World Cup
3	28 September 2026	Arena Națională, Bucharest, Romania	7	Romania	4–1	4–2	2026–27 UEFA Nations League B
