= Toumani Diakité =

Ivorian footballer (born 2006)

- Diakité in 2026

Personal information
- Date of birth: 19 January 2006 (age 20)
- Place of birth: Ivory Coast
- Height: 1.75 m (5 ft 9 in)
- Position: Midfielder

Team information
- Current team: Slavia Prague
- Number: 22

Youth career
- –2025: AFE Abidjan

Senior career*
Years	Team	Apps	(Gls)
2025	BFC Daugavpils	24	(0)
2025	Slovan Liberec B	2	(1)
2025–2026	Slovan Liberec	21	(2)
2026–	Slavia Prague	4	(0)
- * Club domestic league appearances and goals as of 24 October 2026

Toumani Diakité (born 19 January 2006) is an Ivorian professional footballer who plays as a midfielder for Czech First League club Slavia Prague.

== Career ==
=== BFC Daugavpils ===
Diakité began his career at top Ivorian academy side AFE Abidjan, before being scouted, and eventually signed by Latvian Virslīga side BFC Daugavpils in March 2025. Diakité made 27 appearances in his first half-season in Europe, including two in the 2025–26 UEFA Conference League, as part of the club's first ever European campaign.

=== Slovan Liberec ===
Diakité left Daugavpils mid-way through the 2025 season to join Czech First League team Slovan Liberec on a four-year deal, initially playing for the club's B team in the Bohemian Football League. Diakité made his debut for the first team in the Czech Cup, before playing his first and only two games for the B team in October 2025, scoring his team's only goal in a 1–1 draw at home to Ústí nad Orlicí. Diakité came on as a substitute in the following first team match to make his Czech First League debut, before subsequently starting the next 14 matches. Diakité played 21 matches for Slovan Liberec in his first season, scoring two goals from midfield as the side finished 6th.

=== Slavia Prague ===
On 27 June 2026, Diakité signed a contract with Czech First League club Slavia Prague until 30 June 2031.

== Career statistics ==
As of match played 27 October 2026

Appearances and goals by club, season and competition
Club	Season	League			National cup		Continental		Total	
Club	Season	Division	Apps	Goals	Apps	Goals	Apps	Goals	Apps	Goals
Daugavpils	2025	Virslīga	24	0	1	0	2 (Note: Appearances in UEFA Conference League)	0	27	0
Slovan Liberec B	2025–26	Bohemian Football League	2	1	—		—		2	1
Slovan Liberec	2025–26	Czech First League	20	2	1	0	—		21	2
Slavia Prague	2026–27	Czech First League	4	0	2	0	2 (Note: Appearances in UEFA Champions League)	0	8	0
Career total			50	3	4	0	4	0	58	3
