= Dominik Plechatý =

Czech footballer (born 1999)

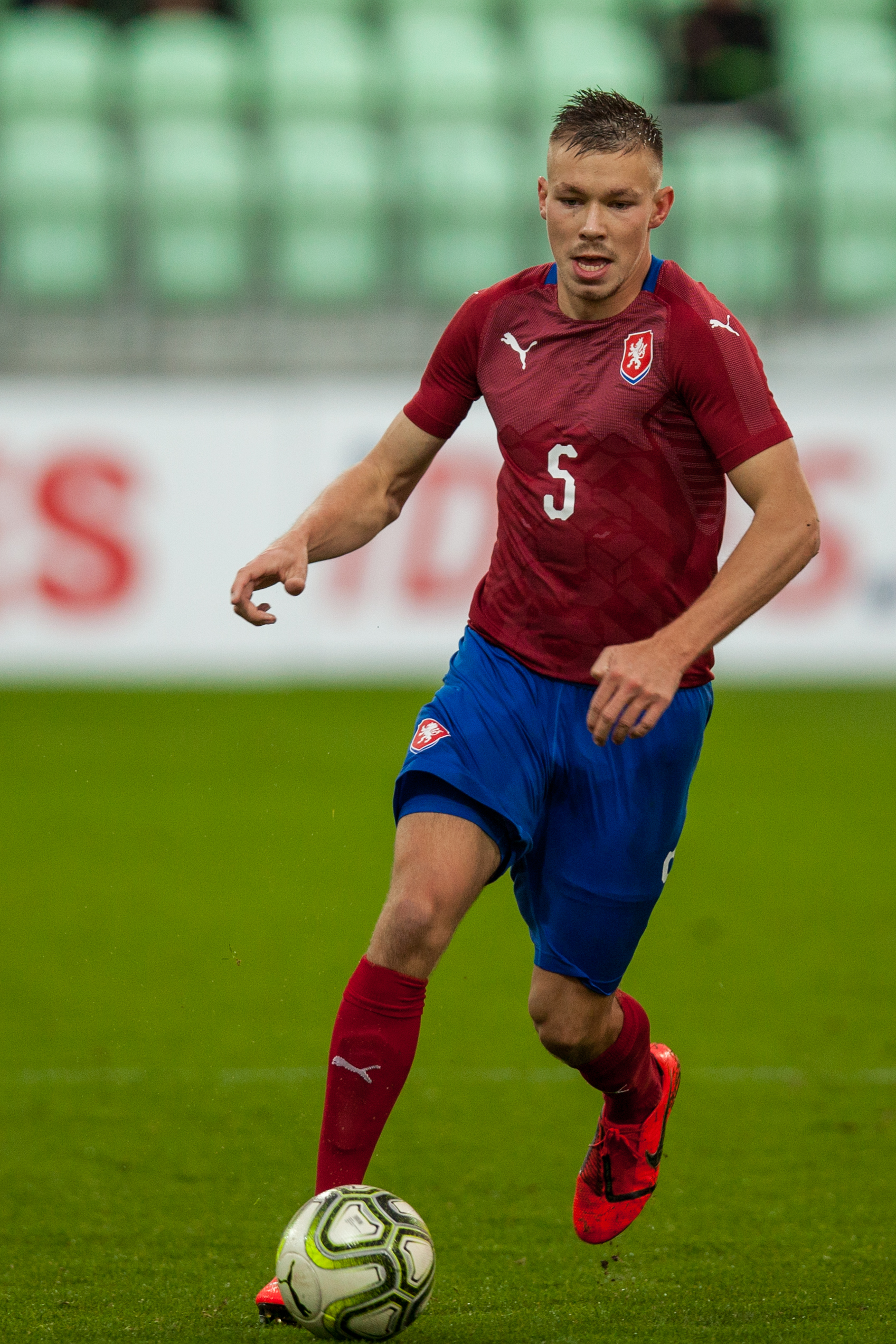
- Plechatý with Czech Republic U21 in 2019

Personal information
- Date of birth: 18 April 1999 (age 27)
- Place of birth: Zvole, Czech Republic
- Height: 1.83 m (6 ft 0 in)
- Position: Defender

Team information
- Current team: Artis Brno
- Number: 4

Senior career*
| Years | Team | Apps | (Gls) |
| 2018–2024 | Sparta Prague | 15 | (0) |
| 2018 | → Vlašim (loan) | 14 | (0) |
| 2019–2020 | → Jablonec (loan) | 26 | (0) |
| 2021 | → Mladá Boleslav (loan) | 3 | (0) |
| 2021 | → Mladá Boleslav B (loan) | 1 | (0) |
| 2021–2024 | → Slovan Liberec (loan) | 53 | (0) |
| 2024–2026 | Slovan Liberec | 34 | (1) |
| 2024–2025 | Slovan Liberec B | 2 | (0) |
| 2026– | Artis Brno | 14 | (0) |

International career
| 2016–2017 | Czech Republic U18 | 13 | (0) |
| 2018 | Czech Republic U19 | 1 | (0) |
| 2018 | Czech Republic U20 | 2 | (0) |
| 2019–2020 | Czech Republic U21 | 11 | (0) |
- * Club domestic league appearances and goals as of 24 May 2026

Dominik Plechatý (born 18 April 1999) is a Czech professional footballer who plays as a defender for Czech First League club Artis Brno.

== Club career ==
=== Youth level ===
On youth level he played for Sparta Prague he played in 3 matches in 2016–17 UEFA Youth League (against Titograd and Altınordu).

=== Sparta Prague ===
He made his debut for the first team on 10 February 2019 in the Czech First League match against Bohemians Praha 1905. He played in 5 matches in 2020–21 UEFA Europa League group stage against Lille, Milan and Celtic.

Since his first match for the first team he played in 15 league matches, in 1 Czech Cup match and in 5 UEFA Europa League matches without scoring a goal.

=== Vlašim (loan) ===
On 17 July 2018 he was loaned to Vlašim in Czech National Football League. In six months long loan he played in 14 league matches and in 3 Czech Cup matches without scoring a goal.

=== Jablonec (loan) ===
On 8 July 2019 he was loaned to Jablonec. In one year long loan he played in 26 league matches and in 2 Czech Cup matches without scoring a goal.

=== Slovan Liberec ===
On 31 May 2024, Plechatý signed a contract with Slovan Liberec until 2027.

=== Artis Brno ===
On 27 January 2026, Plechatý signed a contract with Czech National Football League club Artis Brno until 30 June 2029.

== International career ==
He had played international football at under-18, under-19, under-20 and under-21 levels. He played in 27 youth international matches for the Czech Republic, without scoring a goal.

== Career statistics ==
As of 24 March 2021

Appearances and goals by club, season and competition
| Club | Season | League | | | Czech Cup | | Continental | | Other | | Total | |
| Club | Season | Division | Apps | Goals | Apps | Goals | Apps | Goals | Apps | Goals | Apps | Goals |
|---|---|---|---|---|---|---|---|---|---|---|---|---|
| Vlašim (loan) | 2018–19 | Czech National Football League | 14 | 0 | 3 | 0 | — | | — | | 17 | 0 |
| Sparta Prague | 2018–19 | Czech First League | 5 | 0 | 0 | 0 | — | | — | | 5 | 0 |
| Sparta Prague | 2020–21 | Czech First League | 9 | 0 | 1 | 0 | 5 (Note: Appearances in UEFA Europa League) | 0 | — | | 15 | 0 |
| Sparta Prague | Total | | 14 | 0 | 1 | 0 | 5 | 0 | 0 | 0 | 20 | 0 |
| Jablonec (loan) | 2019–20 | Czech First League | 28 | 0 | 2 | 0 | 0 | 0 | — | | 30 | 0 |
| Career total | | | 56 | 0 | 6 | 0 | 5 | 0 | 0 | 0 | 67 | 0 |
