= Samuel Dancák =

Slovak footballer (born 1998)

Personal information
- Date of birth: 6 March 1998 (age 28)
- Place of birth: Košice, Slovakia
- Height: 1.83 m (6 ft 0 in)
- Position: Defensive midfielder

Team information
- Current team: FC Hradec Králové
- Number: 11

Youth career
- VSS Košice
- Dukla Prague

Senior career*
Years	Team	Apps	(Gls)
2019–2020	Dukla Prague	19	(1)
2021–2024	Mladá Boleslav	70	(1)
2023–2024	→ Hradec Králové (loan)	22	(0)
2024–	Hradec Králové	62	(1)

International career
2014	Slovakia U16	2	(0)
2014–2015	Slovakia U17	5	(0)
2016	Slovakia U18	2	(0)
2019	Slovakia U21	2	(0)
- * Club domestic league appearances and goals as of 27 May 2026

Samuel Dancák (born 6 March 1998) is a Slovak professional footballer who plays as a defensive midfielder for FC Hradec Králové.

== Personal life ==
Dancák was born on 6 March 1998 in Košice, into a family of athletes. From the age of eighteen, he was in the junior team of Dukla Prague and at the same time as playing football, he studied at the Faculty of Physical Education and Sport of the Charles University.

== Career ==
Dancák made his Czech First League debut for Dukla Prague on 30 March 2019 in their 2–0 away loss against SFC Opava. He then played for Dukla Prague in the Czech National Football League after the team was relegated, until January 2021 when he transferred to FK Mladá Boleslav.

Dancák played twice for the Slovakia U21 team.
