= Cengiz Ünder =

Turkish footballer (born 1997)

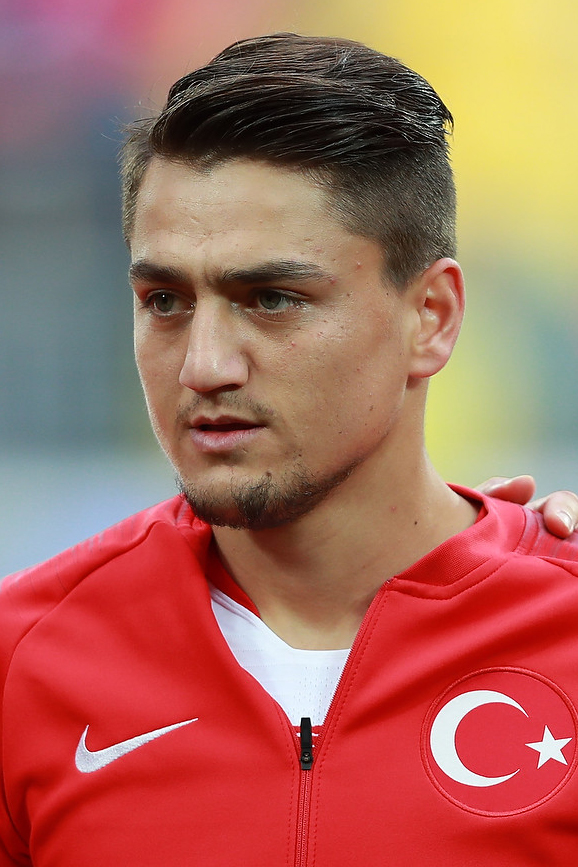
- Ünder with Turkey in 2018

Personal information
- Full name: Cengiz Ünder
- Date of birth: 14 July 1997 (age 29)
- Place of birth: Sındırgı, Balıkesir, Turkey
- Height: 1.73 m (5 ft 8 in)
- Position: Right winger

Team information
- Current team: Çorum
- Number: 23

Youth career
- 2007–2013: Bucaspor
- 2013–2015: Altınordu

Senior career*
Years	Team	Apps	(Gls)
2014–2016	Altınordu	51	(11)
2016–2017	Başakşehir	32	(7)
2017–2022	Roma	70	(13)
2020–2021	→ Leicester City (loan)	9	(0)
2021–2022	→ Marseille (loan)	32	(10)
2022–2023	Marseille	37	(5)
2023–2026	Fenerbahçe	28	(9)
2025	→ Los Angeles FC (loan)	12	(2)
2025–2026	→ Beşiktaş (loan)	26	(5)
2026–	Çorum	8	(4)

International career
2014–2015	Turkey U18	6	(1)
2015–2016	Turkey U19	12	(6)
2016	Turkey U21	3	(0)
2016–2023	Turkey	51	(16)
- * Club domestic league appearances and goals as of 31 October 2026

Cengiz Ünder (Turkish pronunciation: [dʒeɲˈɟiz ynˈdæɾ]; born 14 July 1997) is a Turkish professional footballer who plays as a right winger for Süper Lig club Çorum.

== Club career ==
=== Early career ===
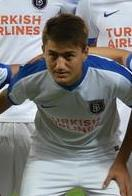
Ünder with Başakşehir in 2017

Ünder began his professional career at Altinordu, and later transferred to Başakşehir for €700K. In his breakout season with Başakşehir, Ünder established himself as one of the best players in the league, scoring 7 goals in 32 games in his debut season in the Süper Lig.

=== Roma ===
On 16 July 2017, Ünder joined Serie A club Roma for a fee of €13.4 million. He scored his first goal for Roma in a 1–0 win over Hellas Verona on 4 February 2018. Later that month, he marked his Champions League debut with a goal; the opener in a 2–1 loss to Shakhtar Donetsk in the first leg of the first round of knockout fixtures, becoming the youngest Turkish player ever to score in the Champions League. In his first season with Roma, he recorded 7 goals and 1 assist in 26 league games, and 1 goal in 5 Champions League matches.

On 2 October 2018, he scored a goal and made an assist in a 5–0 win over Viktoria Plzeň in a Champions League group stage match. Later in the competition, he assisted Kostas Manolas' header from a corner in a 3–0 victory over Barcelona in the quarter-finals, helping his club reach the semi-finals for the first time since 1984 after winning on away goals following a 4–4 aggregate draw.

==== Loan to Leicester City ====
On 20 September 2020, Ünder signed for Premier League club Leicester City on a season-long loan, with the option of a permanent transfer. He made his debut in a 3–0 defeat to West Ham United, coming on as a substitute. On 25 October, he made his first goal contribution for Leicester when he assisted Jamie Vardy's winning goal in a 1–0 away win over Arsenal, which ended Leicester's 47-year wait for a victory away against Arsenal. On 10 December, Ünder scored his first Leicester goal in a 2–0 home win over AEK Athens in the UEFA Europa League.

=== Marseille ===
On 4 July 2021, Ünder moved to France, signing for Ligue 1 club Marseille on loan, with an option to buy for €9 million. On 8 August, he made his debut for the club against Montpellier, where Marseille won 3–2.

On 6 April 2022, Marseille signed Ünder permanently from Roma, penning a five-year long deal.

=== Fenerbahçe ===
On 13 August 2023, Ünder returned to Turkey and signed a four-year contract with Süper Lig club Fenerbahçe for a reported fee of €15 million. On 21 August, he made his debut for the side in a 2-0 away win against Samsunspor.

On 20 December 2023, he scored his first goal for the club against Kayserispor in a match where Fenerbahçe won 4–3. On 7 January 2024, after a slow start to his career with the club, he scored four goals in a 5–1 win over Istanbulspor.

==== Loan to LAFC ====
On 20 February 2025, he joined Major League Soccer side Los Angeles FC on loan until the end of the season. On 12 March, he made his debut with an assist for the team in a CONCACAF Champions Cup match against Colombus Crew. On 29 March, he scored his first goal for the club in a 3–2 loss to San Diego FC.

==== Loan to Beşiktaş ====
On 8 September 2025, Ünder joined Süper Lig side Beşiktaş on a season-long loan with option to buy. On September 13, he scored the winning goal on his debut with the club in a 2–1 win at home against former club Başakşehir.

=== Çorum ===
On 28 August 2026, Ünder joined newly promoted Çorum, signing a one-year deal.

== International career ==
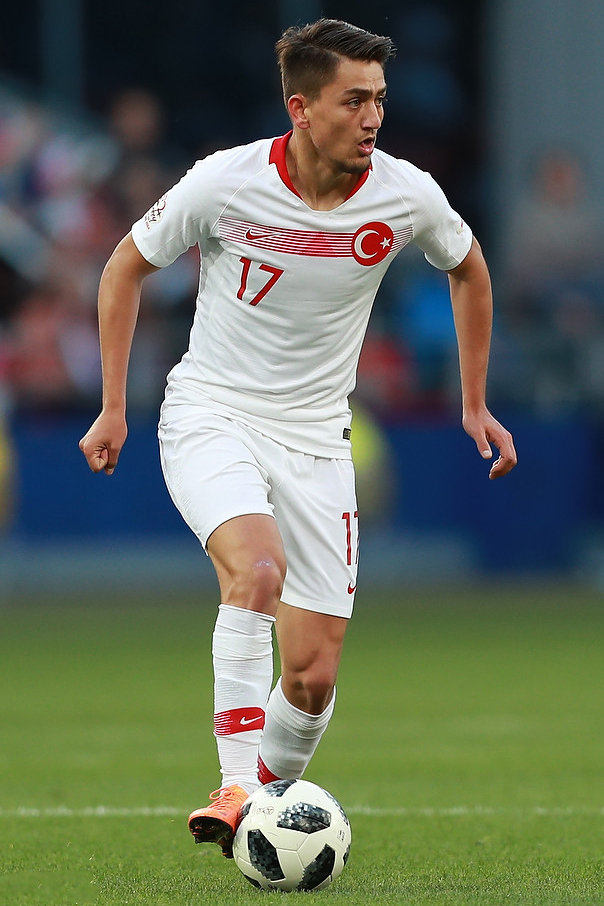
Ünder playing for Turkey in 2018

Ünder has represented the U18 and U19 levels of the Turkey national team. He had also been called up to the Turkey U21 national team.

In November 2016, Ünder received his first call-up to the senior Turkey squad for the match against Kosovo. He scored his first international goal in his second appearance for the national team in a friendly victory against Moldova in March 2017.

On 14 May 2021, Ünder was named in Turkey's 26-man squad for the delayed UEFA Euro 2020 tournament.

== Controversies ==
Following the Afrin offensive in Northern Syria, which was carried out by the Turkish Armed Forces in January 2018, on 11 February, Ünder performed a military salute as a goal celebration after scoring in Roma's 5–2 home win over Benevento. In October 2019, following the Turkish offensive into north-eastern Syria, Ünder posted a picture of the aforementioned celebration on Twitter; his controversial post drew criticism on social media from Roma fans.

When Los Angeles FC signed Ünder in February 2025, a small LAFC supporters’ group identifying as Armenian threatened to boycott games in case of signing a Turkish player, expressing hostility toward players of Turkish nationality.

== Career statistics ==
=== Club ===
As of match played 20 September 2026

Appearances and goals by club, season and competition
Club	Season	League			National cup (Note: Includes Turkish Cup, Coppa Italia, FA Cup, Coupe de France)		Continental		Other		Total	
Club	Season	Division	Apps	Goals	Apps	Goals	Apps	Goals	Apps	Goals	Apps	Goals
Altınordu	2014–15	TFF First League	20	5	6	0	—		—		26	5
Altınordu	2015–16	TFF First League	31	6	1	0	—		—		32	6
Altınordu	Total		51	11	7	0	0	0	0	0	58	11
Başakşehir	2016–17	Süper Lig	32	7	7	2	4 (Note: Appearances in UEFA Europa League)	0	—		43	9
Roma	2017–18	Serie A	26	7	1	0	5 (Note: Appearances in UEFA Champions League)	1	—		32	8
Roma	2018–19	Serie A	26	3	1	0	6	3	—		33	6
Roma	2019–20	Serie A	18	3	2	0	3	0	—		23	3
Roma	Total		70	13	4	0	14	4	0	0	88	17
Leicester City (loan)	2020–21	Premier League	9	0	2	1	8	1	—		19	2
Marseille (loan)	2021–22	Ligue 1	32	10	3	1	12 (Note: Five appearances and one goal in UEFA Europa League, seven appearances and one goal in UEFA Europa Conference League)	2	—		47	13
Marseille	2022–23	Ligue 1	37	5	3	0	6	0	—		46	5
Marseille	Total		69	15	6	1	18	2	0	0	93	18
Fenerbahçe	2023–24	Süper Lig	24	9	2	0	7 (Note: Appearances in UEFA Europa Conference League)	0	—		33	9
Fenerbahçe	2024–25	Süper Lig	3	0	2	0	4	0	—		9	0
Fenerbahçe	2025–26	Süper Lig	1	0	0	0	0	0	—		1	0
Fenerbahçe	Total		28	9	4	0	11	0	0	0	43	9
Los Angeles FC (loan)	2025	MLS	12	2	—		3 (Note: Appearances in CONCACAF Champions Cup)	0	1 (Note: Appearance in FIFA Club World Cup play-in)	0	16	2
Beşiktaş (loan)	2025–26	Süper Lig	26	5	3	0	—		—		29	5
Çorum	2026–27	Süper Lig	4	2	0	0	—		—		4	2
Career total			301	64	33	4	58	7	1	0	393	75

=== International ===
Appearances and goals by national team and year
National team	Year	Apps	Goals
Turkey	2016	1	0
Turkey	2017	6	3
Turkey	2018	10	1
Turkey	2019	3	2
Turkey	2020	6	2
Turkey	2021	10 (Note: Three appearances in UEFA Euro 2020)	3
Turkey	2022	9	4
Turkey	2023	6	1
Total		51	16

Scores and results list Turkey's goal tally first, score column indicates score after each Ünder goal.

List of international goals scored by Cengiz Ünder
No.	Date	Venue	Opponent	Score	Result	Competition
1.	27 March 2017	New Eskişehir Stadium, Eskişehir, Turkey	Moldova	3–0	3–1	Friendly
2.	11 June 2017	Loro Boriçi Stadium, Shkodër, Albania	Kosovo	2–1	4–1	2018 FIFA World Cup qualification
3.	13 November 2017	New Antalya Stadium, Antalya, Turkey	Albania	1–2	2–3	Friendly
4.	27 March 2018	Podgorica City Stadium, Podgorica, Montenegro	Montenegro	1–0	2–2	Friendly
5.	30 May 2019	New Antalya Stadium, Antalya, Turkey	Greece	1–0	2–1	Friendly
6.	8 June 2019	Büyükşehir Stadium, Konya, Turkey	France	2–0	2–0	UEFA Euro 2020 qualification
7.	11 November 2020	Vodafone Park, Istanbul, Turkey	Croatia	3–3	3–3	Friendly
8.	15 November 2020	Şükrü Saracoğlu Stadium, Istanbul, Turkey	Russia	2–1	3–2	2020–21 UEFA Nations League B
9.	3 June 2021	Benteler-Arena, Paderborn, Germany	Moldova	2–0	2–0	Friendly
10.	1 September 2021	Vodafone Park, Istanbul, Turkey	Montenegro	1–0	2–2	2022 FIFA World Cup qualification
11.	7 September 2021	Johan Cruyff Arena, Amsterdam, Netherlands	Netherlands	1–6	1–6	2022 FIFA World Cup qualification
12.	29 March 2022	Büyükşehir Stadium, Konya, Turkey	Italy	1–0	2–3	Friendly
13.	4 June 2022	Başakşehir Fatih Terim Stadium, Istanbul, Turkey	Faroe Islands	1–0	4–0	2022–23 UEFA Nations League C
14.	22 September 2022	Başakşehir Fatih Terim Stadium, Istanbul, Turkey	Luxembourg	1–1	3–3	2022–23 UEFA Nations League C
15.	16 November 2022	Diyarbakır Stadium, Diyarbakır, Turkey	Scotland	2–0	2–1	Friendly
16.	16 June 2023	Skonto Stadium, Riga, Latvia	Latvia	2–1	3–2	UEFA Euro 2024 qualification

== Honours ==
Leicester City

- FA Cup: 2020–21

Individual

- Süper Lig Team of the Season: 2016–17
- Turkish Footballer of the Year: 2018
