= Michal Hlavatý =

Czech footballer

Personal information
- Date of birth: 17 June 1998 (age 28)
- Place of birth: Hořovice, Czech Republic
- Height: 1.70 m (5 ft 7 in)
- Position: Midfielder

Team information
- Current team: Pardubice
- Number: 19

Youth career
- Příbram
- 2016–2017: Viktoria Plzeň

Senior career*
Years	Team	Apps	(Gls)
2017–2022	Viktoria Plzeň	0	(0)
2017–2019	→ Sokolov (loan)	50	(0)
2019–2021	→ Pardubice (loan)	39	(15)
2021–2022	→ Mladá Boleslav (loan)	25	(4)
2022–2024	Pardubice	68	(9)
2024–2025	Slovan Liberec	45	(6)
2026–	Pardubice	13	(0)

International career
2013–2014	Czech Republic U16	6	(0)
2016	Czech Republic U18	3	(0)
2016	Czech Republic U19	8	(0)
2017	Czech Republic U20	7	(2)
2019	Czech Republic U21	1	(0)
- * Club domestic league appearances and goals as of 27 May 2026

Michal Hlavatý (born 17 June 1998) is a Czech professional footballer who plays as a midfielder for Pardubice.

== Club career ==
He made his senior league debut for Sokolov on 30 July 2017 in a Czech National Football League 2–1 loss at Vlašim.

On 1 July 2024, Hlavatý signed a contract with Slovan Liberec until 2028.

On 24 December 2025, Hlavatý signed a four-and-half year contract with Pardubice.

== International career ==
He represented the Czech Republic in multiple youth categories. He participated in the 2017–18 U20 Elite League, scoring a goal in Czech Republic's 3–0 victory against Portugal.
