= Osman Şahin =

Turkish footballer

Personal information
- Date of birth: 13 January 1998 (age 28)
- Place of birth: Arsin, Turkey
- Height: 1.80 m (5 ft 11 in)
- Position: Midfielder

Team information
- Current team: 12 Bingölspor (on loan from Çorum)
- Number: 10

Youth career
- 2011–2013: Erzurum Egitim GücüSpor
- 2013–2015: Erzurumspor
- 2015–2016: Çaykur Rizespor
- 2016–2018: Erzurumspor

Senior career*
| Years | Team | Apps | (Gls) |
| 2018–2021 | BB Erzurumspor | 5 | (0) |
| 2019 | → Yeni Orduspor (loan) | 17 | (2) |
| 2019 | → 24 Erzincanspor (loan) | 16 | (1) |
| 2020 | → BAKspor (loan) | 5 | (0) |
| 2020–2021 | → Ofspor (loan) | 15 | (8) |
| 2021 | Ofspor | 14 | (5) |
| 2021–2022 | Hatayspor | 0 | (0) |
| 2021–2022 | → İskenderunspor (loan) | 34 | (13) |
| 2022–2023 | Iğdır | 13 | (0) |
| 2023 | → Ofspor (loan) | 11 | (5) |
| 2023–2024 | Adana 1954 FK | 23 | (7) |
| 2024–2025 | Orduspor 1967 | 29 | (20) |
| 2025– | Çorum | 0 | (0) |
| 2025– | → 12 Bingölspor (loan) | 11 | (6) |
- * Club domestic league appearances and goals as of 29 November 2025

Osman Şahin (born 13 January 1998) is a Turkish professional footballer who plays as a midfielder for TFF 3. Lig club 12 Bingölspor on loan from Çorum.

== Professional career ==
Şahin made his professional debut with Erzurumspor in a 1-0 Süper Lig loss to Başakşehir on 2 September 2018.
