= Aziz Kayondo =

Ugandan footballer (born 2002)

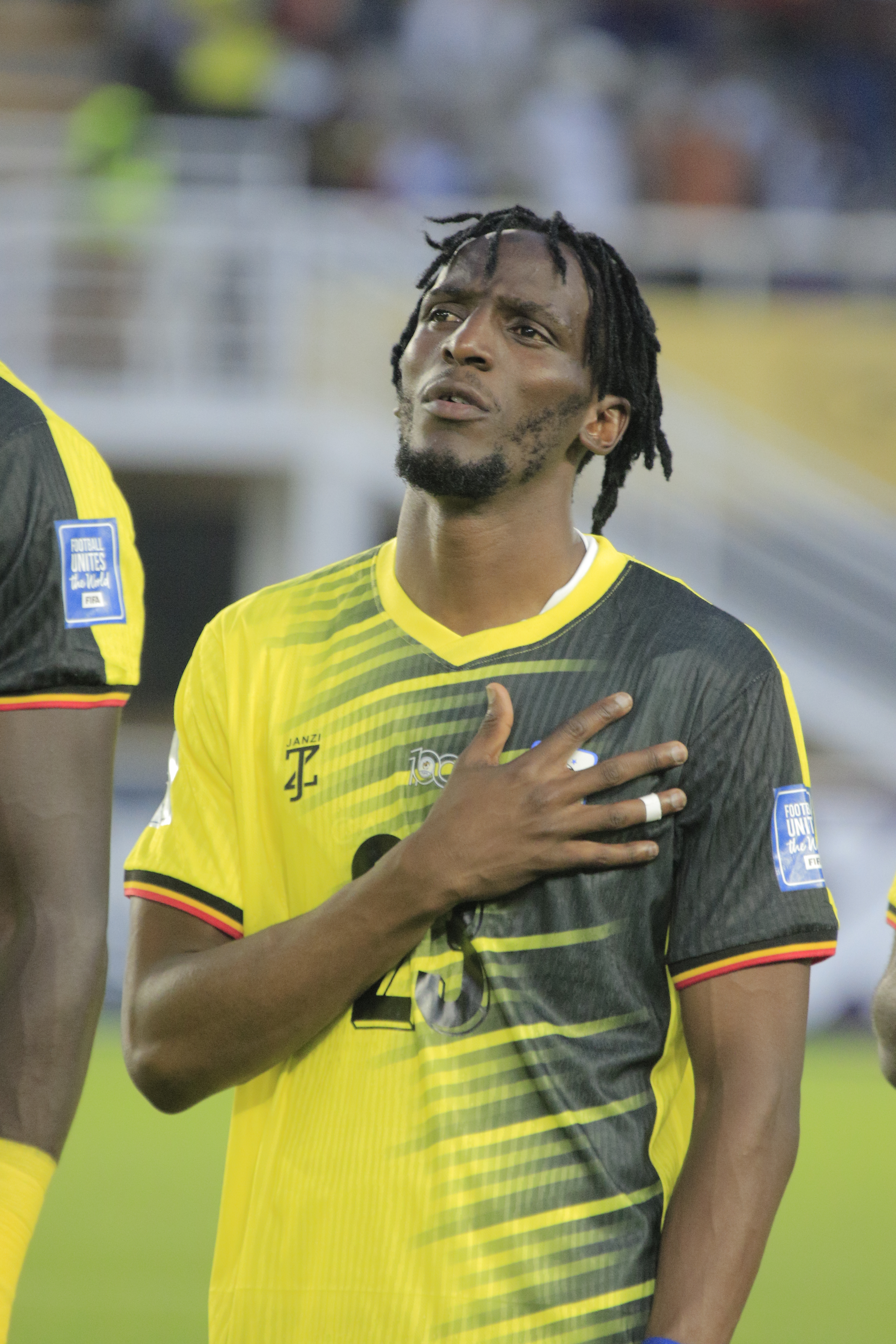
- Kayondo in 2025

Personal information
- Full name: Aziz Abdu Kayondo (Note: Some sources list his name as Abdu Aziz Kayondo.)
- Date of birth: 6 October 2002 (age 24)
- Place of birth: Kyazanga, Uganda
- Height: 1.75 m (5 ft 9 in)
- Position: Defender

Team information
- Current team: Slovan Liberec
- Number: 27

Senior career*
Years	Team	Apps	(Gls)
2018–2022	Vipers SC	1	(0)
2022–2023	MFK Vyškov	0	(0)
2022	→ Real Monarchs (loan)	15	(1)
2023–2024	Leganés B	1	(0)
2023	→ Hapoel Tel Aviv (loan)	0	(0)
2024	→ MFK Vyškov (loan)	7	(0)
2024–	Slovan Liberec	52	(1)

International career^{‡}
2021–	Uganda	23	(2)
- * Club domestic league appearances and goals as of 27 May 2026 ‡ National team caps and goals as of 20:40, 9 September 2024 (UTC)

Aziz Abdu Kayondo (born 6 October 2002) is a Ugandan footballer who plays as a defender for Czech club Slovan Liberec and the Uganda national football team.

== Club career ==
Kayondo is a product of St. Mary's secondary school, Kitende where he started his footballing career at the school and later played for Vipers junior and senior teams between 2018 and 2022.

He played for Vipers SC from 2018 up to 2022. In the Uganda cup 2020/21 season Kayondo helped Vipers SC to win the title.

Kayondo joined MFK Vyškov in 2022 as he came from Vipers SC, and he was sent to Real Monarchs on loan. He played 15 games and appeared on 13 more lineups for the club, scored for them only one goal, and got 8 yellow cards. He was substituted in 2 times and substituted out 3 times. He later returned to the club until 2023 where he was signed by Leganés B.

On 11 July 2024, Czech Republic First League side Slovan Liberec signed Kayondo on a four-year contract until 2028. He was playing for MFK Vyskov in the Czech Republic's second tier on a loan deal from CB Leganes B a Spanish club.

== International career ==
On December 7, 2025, he was selected by Paul Put for Uganda's squad to participate in the 2025 Africa Cup of Nations.

== Trophies ==
Uganda U20

- Africa U20 Cup of Nations runner-up: 2021

Vipers SC

- Uganda Cup: 2020–21
