= Lukáš Mašek =

Czech footballer

Personal information
- Date of birth: 8 May 2004 (age 22)
- Place of birth: Mladá Boleslav, Czech Republic
- Height: 1.82 m (6 ft 0 in)
- Position: Forward

Team information
- Current team: FC Slovan Liberec
- Number: 9

Youth career
- 2011–2020: Mladá Boleslav

Senior career*
Years	Team	Apps	(Gls)
2020–2025	Mladá Boleslav	69	(6)
2020–2023	Mladá Boleslav B	18	(14)
2024	→ Chrudim (loan)	14	(6)
2025–	Slovan Liberec	33	(7)

International career
2018–2019	Czech Republic U15	12	(5)
2019–2020	Czech Republic U16	7	(3)
2021–2023	Czech Republic U19	16	(4)
2023–2024	Czech Republic U20	8	(2)
- * Club domestic league appearances and goals as of 27 May 2026

Lukáš Mašek (born 8 May 2004) is a Czech professional footballer who plays as a forward for FC Slovan Liberec.

On 22 February 2024, Mladá Boleslav loaned Mašek to Chrudim on a half-year loan deal.

== Career statistics ==
=== Club ===
As of 10 November 2021.

Club	Season	League			Cup		Continental		Other		Total	
Club	Season	Division	Apps	Goals	Apps	Goals	Apps	Goals	Apps	Goals	Apps	Goals
Mladá Boleslav	2020–21	Fortuna liga	5	0	1 (Note: Appearances in the Czech Cup)	0	–		0	0	6	0
Mladá Boleslav	2021–22	Fortuna liga	12	0	3	0	–		0	0	15	0
Mladá Boleslav	Total		17	0	4	0	0	0	0	0	21	0
Mladá Boleslav B	2020–21	ČFL	1	1	–		–		0	0	1	1
Mladá Boleslav B	2021–22	ČFL	2	0	–		–		0	0	2	0
Mladá Boleslav B	Total		3	1	0	0	0	0	0	0	3	1
Career total			20	1	4	0	0	0	0	0	24	1
