= Vojtěch Stránský =

Czech footballer (born 2003)

Personal information
- Date of birth: 13 March 2003 (age 23)
- Place of birth: Ostrava, Czech Republic
- Height: 1.81 m (5 ft 11 in)
- Position: Midfielder

Team information
- Current team: Slovan Liberec
- Number: 12

Youth career
- 2009–2015: Mnichovohradišťský SK
- 2015–2020: Mladá Boleslav

Senior career*
Years	Team	Apps	(Gls)
2020–2025	Mladá Boleslav	57	(5)
2020–2024	Mladá Boleslav B	24	(3)
2023–2024	→ Varnsdorf (loan)	28	(5)
2025–	Slovan Liberec	35	(2)

International career^{‡}
2021–2022	Czech Republic U19	12	(2)
2022–	Czech Republic U20	2	(0)
2025–	Czech Republic U21	2	(0)
- * Club domestic league appearances and goals as of 27 May 2026 ‡ National team caps and goals as of 2 June 2025

Vojtěch Stránský (born 13 March 2003) is a Czech footballer who plays as a midfielder for Slovan Liberec.

== Career statistics ==
=== Club ===
As of 10 November 2021.

Club	Season	League			Cup		Continental		Other		Total	
Club	Season	Division	Apps	Goals	Apps	Goals	Apps	Goals	Apps	Goals	Apps	Goals
Mladá Boleslav	2019–20	Fortuna liga	3	0	0	0	–		0	0	3	0
Mladá Boleslav	2020–21	Fortuna liga	0	0	0	0	–		0	0	0	0
Mladá Boleslav	2021–22	Fortuna liga	7	1	3 (Note: Appearances in the Czech Cup)	1	0	0	0	0	10	2
Mladá Boleslav	Total		10	1	3	1	0	0	0	0	13	2
Mladá Boleslav B	2020–21	ČFL	1	0	–		–		0	0	1	0
Mladá Boleslav B	2021–22	ČFL	4	2	–		–		0	0	4	2
Mladá Boleslav B	Total		5	2	0	0	0	0	0	0	5	2
Career total			15	3	3	1	0	0	0	0	18	4
