= Raimonds Krollis =

Latvian footballer

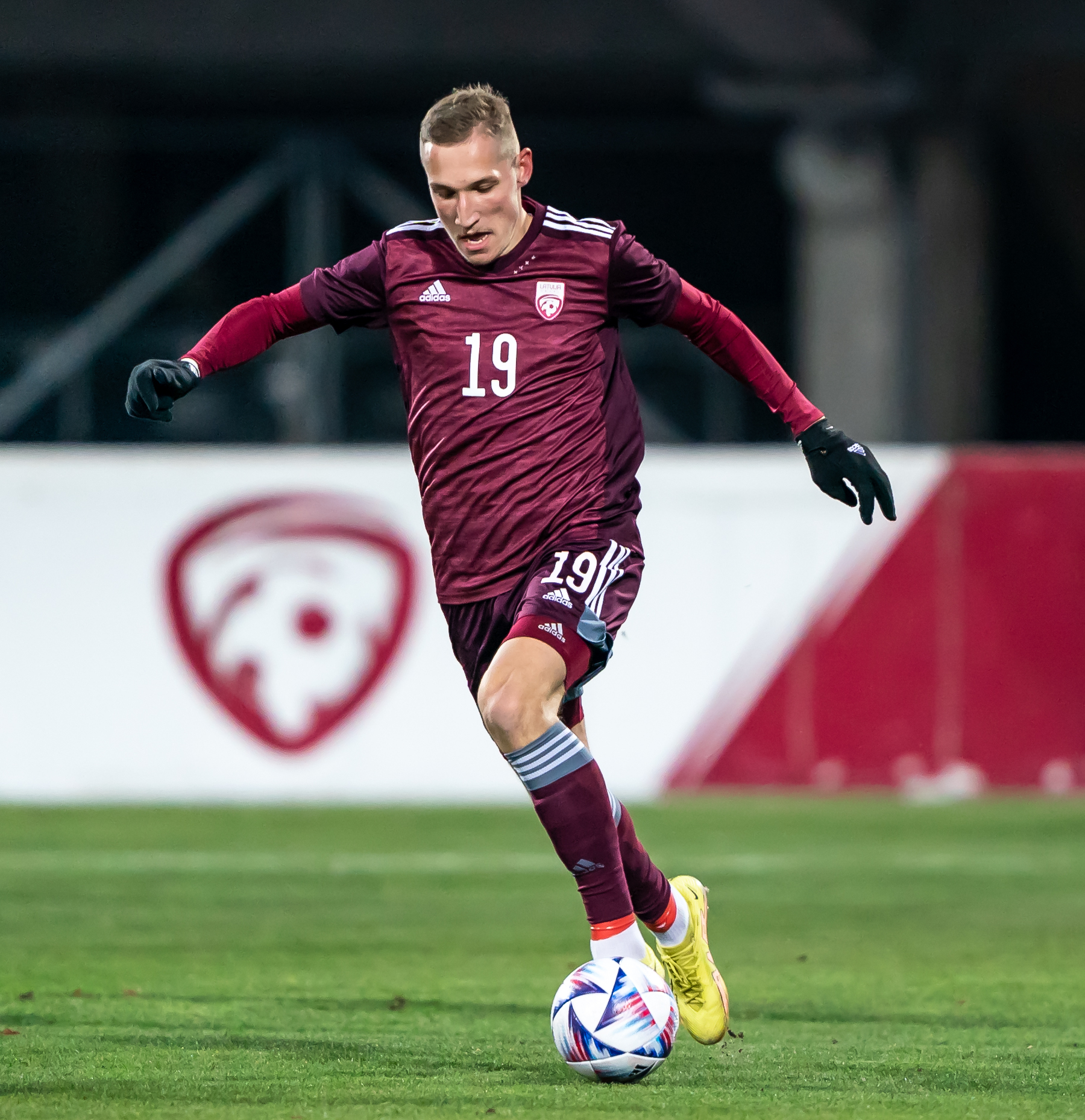
- Krollis with Latvia in 2022

Personal information
- Date of birth: 28 October 2001 (age 25)
- Place of birth: Riga, Latvia
- Height: 1.86 m (6 ft 1 in)
- Position: Forward

Team information
- Current team: Slovan Liberec
- Number: 99

Youth career
- –2018: Metta

Senior career*
Years	Team	Apps	(Gls)
2018–2021	Metta	49	(16)
2021–2022	Valmiera	59	(37)
2023–2025	Spezia	13	(0)
2024	→ Vyškov (loan)	12	(5)
2024–2025	→ Triestina (loan)	14	(0)
2025–	Slovan Liberec	39	(14)

International career^{‡}
2019–2020	Latvia U19	13	(10)
2020–	Latvia	39	(4)
- * Club domestic league appearances and goals as of 27 May 2026 ‡ National team caps and goals as of 27 November 2024

Raimonds Krollis (born 28 October 2001) is a Latvian professional footballer who plays as a forward for Czech First League club Slovan Liberec, and the Latvia national team.

== Career ==
=== Valmiera ===
Krollis joined Valmiera in 2021 and was a key part of the 2022 season title-winners, scoring twenty-four goals across the season. At the end of season awards, Krollis won award for the best Young Player of the Year, the top goal-scorer, the best striker and Player of the Season.

=== Spezia ===
On 20 January 2023, Krollis joined Serie A club Spezia on a three-and-a-half-year contract. On 23 January 2023 Krollis was brought on for his first Seria A start, remaining on the bench for the entire game. Krollis got his Serie A-debut on 2 February 2023, during a 0-3 loss to Napoli, wherein Krollis was substituted during the 76th minute of the match. Since, he has broken into the Spezia team-sheet, consistently appearing on the bench.

On 27 February 2024, Spezia loaned Krollis to Czech National Football League club Vyškov until the end of the season with option to make transfer permanent.

On 6 August 2024, Krollis moved on loan to Triestina in Serie C, with an option to buy.

=== Slovan Liberec ===
On 6 February 2025, Krollis signed a contract with Czech First League club Slovan Liberec until June 2028.

== International career ==
Krollis made his international debut for Latvia on 6 September 2020 in the UEFA Nations League against Malta.

== Career statistics ==
=== International ===
As of 26 March 2024

Latvia
Year	Apps	Goals
2020	4	1
2021	13	1
2022	10	1
2023	9	0
2024	1	1
Total	37	4

== International goals ==
Scores and results list Latvia's goal tally first.

No.	Date	Venue	Opponent	Score	Result	Compedition
1.	17 November 2020	Estadi Nacional, Andorra la Vella, Andorra	Andorra	5–0	5–0	2020–21 UEFA Nations League
2.	16 November 2021	Victoria Stadium, Gibraltar	Gibraltar	3–1	3–1	2022 FIFA World Cup qualification
3.	16 November 2022	Daugava Stadium, Riga, Latvia	Estonia	1–1	1–1	2022 Baltic Cup
4.	26 March 2024	Antonis Papadopoulos Stadium, Larnaca, Cyprus	Liechtenstein	1–1	1–1	Friendly match

== Honours ==
Valmiera

- Latvian Higher League: 2022

Individual

- Virsliga Player of the Year: 2022
- Ilmars Liepens Young Player of the Year: 2022
- Virsliga Top Goalscorer: 2022
- Virsliga Best Striker: 2022
