= Josef Koželuh =

Czech footballer (born 2002)

Personal information
- Full name: Josef Koželuh
- Date of birth: 15 February 2002 (age 24)
- Place of birth: Plzeň, Czech Republic
- Height: 1.80 m (5 ft 11 in)
- Position: Centre back

Team information
- Current team: Slovan Liberec
- Number: 18

Youth career
- 2009−2012: Sokol Štěnovice
- 2012−2013: Petřín Plzeň
- 2013−2021: Viktoria Plzeň

Senior career*
Years	Team	Apps	(Gls)
2021−2024	Viktoria Plzeň	0	(0)
2022	→ Viktoria Žižkov (loan)	13	(1)
2022−2023	→ Chrudim (loan)	25	(0)
2023−2024	→ Zbrojovka Brno (loan)	21	(0)
2024−	Slovan Liberec	39	(1)

International career^{‡}
2017	Czech Republic U-15	8	(0)
2017-2018	Czech Republic U16	15	(0)
2018-2019	Czech Republic U17	20	(0)
2021-2022	Czech Republic U20	11	(0)
2023-	Czech Republic U21	10	(0)
- * Club domestic league appearances and goals as of 26 May 2026 ‡ National team caps and goals as of 17 June 2025

Josef Koželuh (born 15 February 2002) is a Czech footballer who currently plays as a centre back for Slovan Liberec.
