= Libor Janáček =

Czech footballer

Personal information
- Date of birth: 23 July 1969 (age 57)
- Place of birth: Czechoslovakia
- Position: Midfielder

Youth career
- 1976–1980: Tatran Bílý Kostel
- 1980–1985: Slovan Liberec
- 1986–1987: Tatran Bílý Kostel
- 1987–1990: Slovan Hrádek n. Nisou
- 1990–1993: Slovan Liberec

Senior career*
| Years | Team | Apps | (Gls) |
| 1993–1999 | FC Slovan Liberec | 183 | (11) |
| 2000–2003 | Bohemians 1905 | 108 | (5) |
| 2004–2005 | FCO Neugersdorf | 23 | (0) |
- * Club domestic league appearances and goals

Libor Janáček (born 23 July 1969) is a Czech former football midfielder. He played in the Gambrinus liga, making over 250 appearances over the course of ten seasons for FC Slovan Liberec and later Bohemians 1905.
