= Lukáš Letenay =

Slovak footballer

Personal information
- Date of birth: 19 April 2001 (age 25)
- Place of birth: Bratislava, Slovakia
- Height: 1.90 m (6 ft 3 in)
- Position: Forward

Youth career
- –2015: FKM Karlova Ves Bratislava
- 2015–2019: AS Trenčín →

Senior career*
| Years | Team | Apps | (Gls) |
| 2018–2023 | AS Trenčín | 35 | (0) |
| 2021 | → Dubnica nad Váhom | 7 | (1) |
| 2022–2023 | → Púchov | 29 | (18) |
| 2024– | Slovan Liberec | 55 | (7) |

International career
| 2017 | Slovakia U16 | 7 | (0) |
| 2018 | Slovakia U17 | 3 | (0) |
| 2019 | Slovakia U19 | 5 | (0) |
- * Club domestic league appearances and goals as of 22 June 2026

Lukáš Letenay (born 19 April 2001) is a Slovak professional footballer who plays as a forward for FC Slovan Liberec.

== Club career ==
=== AS Trenčín ===
Letenay made his Slovak First Football League debut for AS Trenčín against Pohronie on 30 November 2019 during a 1–0 home loss. Letenay came on in the last ten minutes to replace Ryan Koolwijk, with the final score already set in the first half by András Mészáros.
