= Çorum F.K. =

Turkish Professional football club

Çorum
- Full name: Çorum Futbol Kulübü A.Ş.
- Nickname: Kırmızı Şimşekler (Red Lightnings)
- Founded: 1997; 29 years ago (as Çorum Belediyespor); 20 December 2018; 7 years ago (as Yeni Çorumspor); November 2019; 6 years ago (as Çorum Futbol Kulübü)
- Stadium: Çorum City Stadium
- Capacity: 15,000
- Coordinates: 40°32′04″N 34°55′22″E
- Owner: Savaş Balçık
- President: Savaş Balçık
- Head coach: Burak Yılmaz
- League: Süper Lig
- 2025–26: TFF 1. Lig, 4th of 20 (promoted via play-offs)
- Website: http://www.corumfk.com.tr/
Home colours	Away colours	Third colours

Çorum Futbol Kulübü (Turkish pronunciation: [ˈtʃoɾum]) is a Turkish football club located in Çorum. The club currently plays in the Süper Lig, the first tier of Turkish football.

== History ==
The club was founded under the name Çorum Belediyespor in 1997. An amateur for most of its existence, it won the Turkish Regional Amateur League in the 2011–12 season and was promoted into the TFF Third League. On 20 December 2018, the club changed its name to Yeni Çorumspor. In November 2019, the club started a three-year takeover process of the club Çorumspor. On 24 December 2019, the club again changed its name to Çorum Futbol Kulübü, while it finalized a merger and acquisition of Çorumspor.

In the 2022–23 season, Çorum FK secured the title of White Group and promotion to TFF First League for the first time in history from next season after finishing top of the table.

In 2025–26 season, Çorum FK finished TFF First League fourth, and won the promotion play-off final game against Esenler Erokspor by 2–0 on May 24th, 2026, and promoted to Süper Lig for the first time in their history.

== Colours and badge ==
Originally playing under blue and white, the club's colours are red and black as of 2014.

== Statistics ==
=== League participations ===
- Süper Lig: 2026-
- TFF First League: 2023–26
- TFF Second League: 2019–23
- TFF Third League: 2012–18
- Regional Amateur League: 2010–12
- Super Amateur Leagues: 1997–2010

== Current squad ==
As of 4 September 2026

Note: Flags indicate national team as defined under FIFA eligibility rules; some limited exceptions apply. Players may hold more than one non-FIFA nationality.

No.	Pos.	Nation	Player
1	GK	BRA	Marcos Felipe
2	DF	TUR	Çağlar Söyüncü
3	MF	TUR	Berat Özdemir
4	DF	TUR	Serdar Saatçı
5	DF	POR	Alexandre Penetra (on loan from AZ)
6	DF	CRO	Hrvoje Smolčić
7	FW	TUR	Cengiz Ünder
8	MF	NOR	Markus Karlsbakk
9	FW	SEN	Mame Thiam
10	MF	CIV	Mohamed Diomande
11	DF	TUR	Gökhan Sazdağı
14	FW	GER	Youssoufa Moukoko (on loan from Copenhagen)
15	DF	TUR	Arda Şengül
16	MF	ANG	Fredy (captain)
17	MF	TUR	Emircan Gürlük

No.	Pos.	Nation	Player
18	GK	TUR	Erhan Erentürk
19	FW	VEN	Jesús Ramírez
20	MF	ALB	Ylber Ramadani
21	MF	TUR	Göktan Gürpüz (on loan from Trabzonspor)
22	DF	TUR	Hüseyin Bulut
23	FW	TUR	Hasanege Akdoğan
24	DF	ROU	Andrei Borza
26	MF	BIH	Ermin Mahmić
30	MF	TUR	Ahmed Ildız
45	FW	TUR	Furkan Çetinkaya
54	GK	TUR	Arif Şimşir
88	DF	TUR	Cemali Sertel
89	FW	GRE	Alexandros Kyziridis
—	MF	GER	Atakan Akkaynak

=== Out on loan ===
Note: Flags indicate national team as defined under FIFA eligibility rules; some limited exceptions apply. Players may hold more than one non-FIFA nationality.

No.	Pos.	Nation	Player
—	MF	TUR	Hasan Emre Yeşilyurt (at Sarıyer until 30 June 2027)
—	MF	TUR	Eren Karadağ (at Sarıyer until 30 June 2027)
—	FW	IRQ	Hasan Abdulkareem (at Al-Zawraa until 30 June 2026)
—	FW	TUR	Mert Aktaş (at Güzide Gebze SK until 30 June 2027)

No.	Pos.	Nation	Player
—	MF	TUR	Osman Şahin (at Erciyes 38 FK until 30 June 2027)
—	FW	TUR	Semih Akyıldız (at Ankara Demirspor until 30 June 2027)
—	FW	TUR	Kenan Fakılı (at Bodrumspor until 30 June 2027)

== Honours ==
- TFF Second League: 2022–23 (White)
- Turkish Regional Amateur League: 2011–12
