= Augustin Drakpe =

Togolese football player

Personal information
- Date of birth: 8 December 2001 (age 24)
- Place of birth: Kpimé-Hloma, Togo
- Height: 1.85 m (6 ft 1 in)
- Position: Centre-back

Team information
- Current team: Slovan Liberec
- Number: 14

Youth career
- 2013–2020: Sparta Rotterdam

Senior career*
Years	Team	Apps	(Gls)
2020	Sparta Rotterdam	1	(0)
2020–2024	Jong Sparta	75	(0)
2024–2025	Spakenburg	16	(0)
2025	Dordrecht	37	(0)
2026–	Slovan Liberec	9	(0)

International career^{‡}
2022	Togo U23	2	(0)
2025–	Togo	1	(0)
- * Club domestic league appearances and goals as of 27 May 2026 ‡ National team caps and goals as of 2 January 2026

Augustin Drakpe (born 8 December 2001) is a Togolese professional footballer who plays as a centre-back for the Czech First League club FC Slovan Liberec and for the Togo national team.

== Club career ==
Drakpe joined the academy at Sparta in 2013 and progressed through the age group teams before moving to Jong Sparta. He made his professional debut in the Eredivisie for Sparta Rotterdam on 22 April 2022 in a 2–0 defeat against FC Twente. In May 2022 Drakpe signed a new contract with Sparta to keep him with the club until the summer of 2024, with the option of another season for the club.

On 15 January 2025, Drakpe signed a contract with Dordrecht until 30 June 2026. However, on 31 December 2025, he transferred to the Czech club Slovan Liberec, signing a contract until 2029.

== International career ==
Drakpe was called up to the Togo U23s in 2021 for matches against Tajikistan and Malawi. He was called up to the senior Togo national team for a set of 2026 FIFA World Cup qualification matches in September 2025.
