= David Costa =

David Costa may refer to:

- David Costa (graphic designer) (born 1947), English graphic designer and musician
- David (footballer, born 1977), also known as David Pereira da Costa, (born 1977), Brazilian footballer
- David Da Costa (footballer, born 1986), Swiss football goalkeeper
- David Da Costa (footballer, born 2001), Portuguese football winger for Portland Timbers
- David Costa (footballer, born 2004), Cape Verdean football attacking midfielder for Torreense

== See also ==
- David Costas (born 1995), Spanish footballer
