= Erhan Erentürk =

Turkish footballer

Personal information
- Date of birth: 30 May 1995 (age 31)
- Place of birth: Konak, Turkey
- Height: 1.90 m (6 ft 3 in)
- Position: Goalkeeper

Team information
- Current team: Çorum
- Number: 18

Youth career
- 2008–2009: Altay
- 2009–2011: İzmir BB
- 2011–2013: Buca Geliştirmespor
- 2013–2014: Karşıyaka

Senior career*
Years	Team	Apps	(Gls)
2014–2018	Karşıyaka	76	(0)
2018–2021	Altınordu	70	(0)
2021–2022	Bursaspor	22	(0)
2022–2023	Konyaspor	5	(0)
2023–2024	Sivasspor	0	(0)
2024	→ Manisa (loan)	12	(0)
2024–2026	Gençlerbirliği	45	(0)
2026–	Çorum	0	(0)
- * Club domestic league appearances and goals as of 16 October 2026

Erhan Erentürk (born 30 May 1995) is a Turkish professional footballer who plays as a goalkeeper for Süper Lig club Çorum.

== Professional career ==
Erentürk is a product of the youth academies of Altay, İzmir BB, Buca Geliştirmespor, and Karşıyaka. He began his senior career with Karşıyaka in 2014 in the TFF First League. He moved to Altınordu in the summer of 2018, where he was the starter for 3 seasons. For the 2021-22 season, he played with Bursaspor where he made 30 appearances in all competitions.

On 22 June 2022, he transferred to the Süper Lig club Konyaspor, signing a 3-year contract. He made his Süper Lig debut with Konyaspor in a 1–0 win over Ümraniyespor on 2 October 2022, keeping a clean sheet.

== International career ==
Erentürk was called up to the Turkey U23s for the 2017 Islamic Solidarity Games.

== Career statistics ==
As of match played 13 May 2026

Appearances and goals by club, season and competition
Club	Season	League			Cup		Europe		Other		Total	
Club	Season	Division	Apps	Goals	Apps	Goals	Apps	Goals	Apps	Goals	Apps	Goals
Karşıyaka	2014–15	1. Lig	2	0	0	0	—		—		2	0
Karşıyaka	2015–16	1. Lig	8	0	3	0	—		—		11	0
Karşıyaka	2016–17	2. Lig	34	0	0	0	—		—		34	0
Karşıyaka	2017–18	2. Lig	32	0	0	0	—		—		32	0
Karşıyaka	Total		76	0	0	0	—		—		76	0
Altınordu	2018–19	1. Lig	0	0	1	0	—		—		1	0
Altınordu	2019–20	1. Lig	33	0	0	0	—		—		33	0
Altınordu	2020–21	1. Lig	34	0	0	0	—		3	0	37	0
Altınordu	Total		67	0	0	0	—		3	0	70	0
Bursaspor	2021–22	1. Lig	22	0	0	0	—		—		22	0
Konyaspor	2022–23	Süper Lig	5	0	2	0	0	0	—		7	0
Sivasspor	2023–24	Süper Lig	0	0	2	0	—		—		2	0
Manisa (loan)	2023–24	1. Lig	12	0	—		—		—		12	0
Gençlerbirliği	2024–25	1. Lig	38	0	0	0	—		—		38	0
Gençlerbirliği	2025–26	Süper Lig	7	0	6	0	—		—		13	0
Gençlerbirliği	Total		45	0	6	0	—		—		51	0
Career total			227	0	11	0	0	0	3	0	241	0
