= David Da Costa (footballer, born 1986) =

Swiss footballer (born 1986)

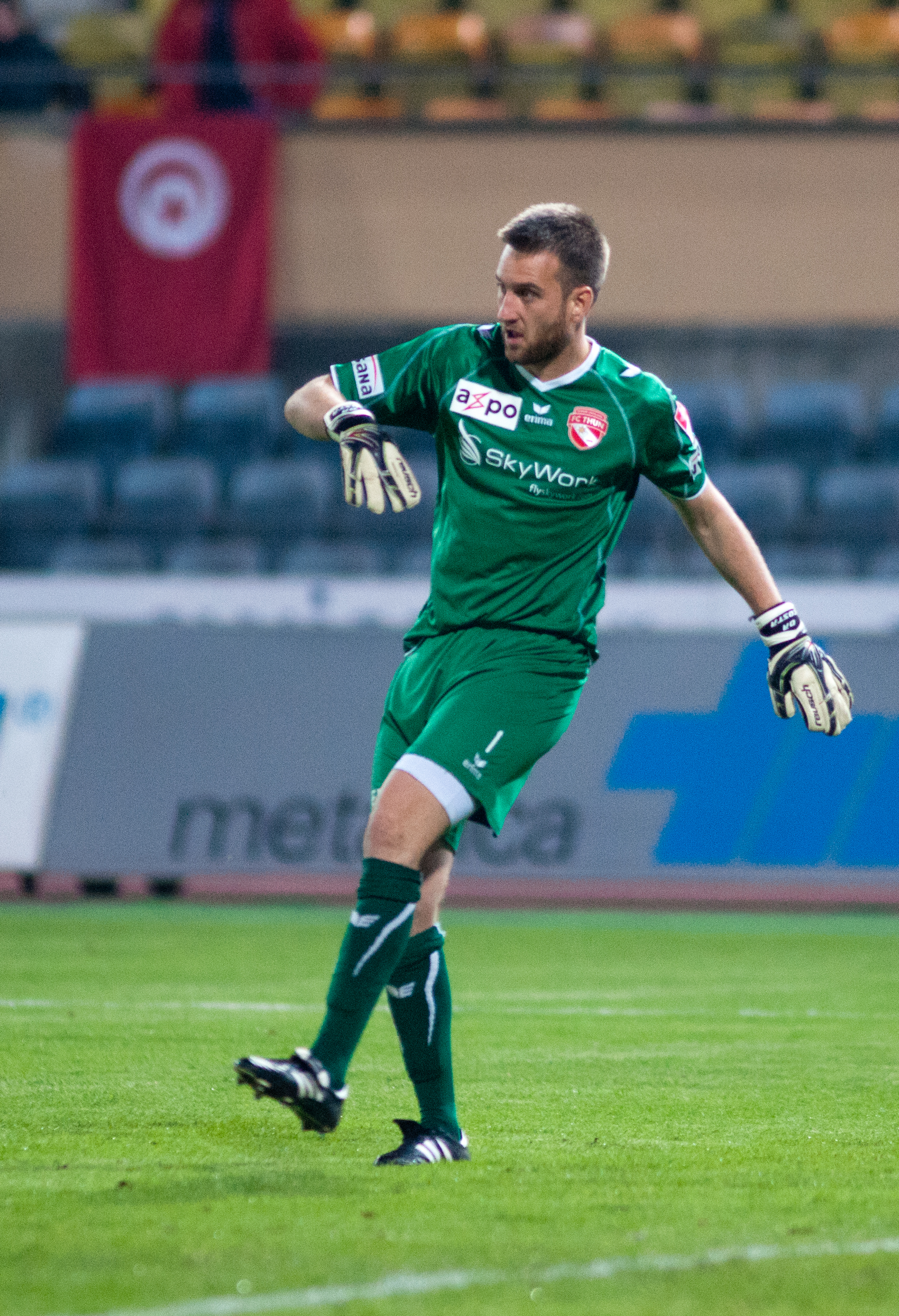

Personal information
- Date of birth: 19 April 1986 (age 40)
- Place of birth: Zürich, Switzerland
- Height: 1.86 m (6 ft 1 in)
- Position: Goalkeeper

Team information
- Current team: FC Thalwil
- Number: 1

Senior career*
Years	Team	Apps	(Gls)
2005–2007	Zürich U-21	44	(0)
2007–2008	Chiasso	1	(0)
2008–2009	Concordia	18	(0)
2009–2010	Chiasso	7	(0)
2010	Wohlen	9	(0)
2010–2012	Thun	78	(0)
2012–2015	Zürich	93	(0)
2015–2017	Novara	76	(0)
2017–2020	Lugano	38	(0)
2020–2021	Schaffhausen	26	(0)
2021–	FC Thalwil	8	(0)
- * Club domestic league appearances and goals as of 16 October 2021

David Da Costa (born 19 April 1986) is a Swiss footballer who plays for FC Thalwil in the fourth-tier Swiss 1. Liga, as a goalkeeper.

== Club career ==
Costa was signed by Italian Serie B club Novara Calcio on 4 June 2015.
