= FC Slovan Liberec =

Slovan Liberec
- Full name: Football Club Slovan Liberec, a.s.
- Nickname: Modrobílí (Blue-whites)
- Founded: 1958; 68 years ago
- Ground: Stadion u Nisy, Liberec
- Capacity: 9,900
- Chairman: Petra Kania
- Manager: Branislav Fodrek
- League: Czech First League
- 2025–26: 6th of 16
- Website: www.fcslovanliberec.cz
Home colours	Away colours	Third colours

FC Slovan Liberec (Czech pronunciation: [ˈslovan ˈlɪbɛrɛts]), commonly referred to as Slovan Liberec or simply Slovan, is a Czech professional football club based in the city of Liberec. The club is one of the most successful in the Czech Republic, having won three league titles and the domestic cup since 1993. Glass-making company Preciosa a.s. is the current main sponsor of the club.

== History ==
=== Early years ===
The first predecessor of the Liberec football club was the Reichenberger Fussballklub (RFK) which was founded in 1899 (renamed to Reichenberger Sportklub [RSK] in 1904). Because Liberec was a city where the majority of inhabitants were of German nationality, until 1945, it was Germans who first established clubs and played their own league. The first Czech football club, SK Liberec, was established after World War I on 11 May 1919. In 1922, the original German club FK Rapid Ober Rosenthal became the Czech club SK Rapid Horní Růžodol. In the same year, another Liberec-based club – SK Doubí – was established, followed by AFK Stráž bezpečnosti in 1931. On 27 February 1934, SK Liberec took on the new name of Slavia Liberec so that the Czech footballers could affirm their club's Slavic character at a time when the Nazi regime in neighbouring Germany already represented a serious threat to the former Czechoslovakia as well as all of Europe.

The rivalry that once existed in Liberec between Rapid and Slavia can be compared to a smaller version of the rivalry between Prague's two most famous clubs, Sparta and Slavia. In 1938, the Munich Agreement was signed, in which representatives of the United Kingdom, France, Italy and Germany forced Czechoslovakia to withdraw from their border area and surrender it to Germany. After the city of Liberec was incorporated into the Third Reich, Czech football in the city came to a halt for a full seven years.

=== Post-War era ===
At the end of World War II and with the liberation of Czechoslovakia in 1945, Liberec took on the character of a Czech city. The first post-war match was played in Turnov on 10 June 1945 by Liberec's football club Slavia. On 15 July 1945, representatives of Czech football clubs from the border areas that had started up again met at the Radnice hotel. The result of the meeting was the verdict that each border-area club continue in the same league that it had played in up until 1938. After seven years of forced inactivity, Slavia Liberec was again included in Class I A and Rapid Horní Růžodol in Class II. In February 1948, the Communists seized power in Czechoslovakia. Under the new name of Kolora, Rapid Liberec, formerly Horní Růžodol, fought its way to be promoted to the Czechoslovak First League. Due to the poor restructuring of Czechoslovak physical education and sports, Kolora remained in the second league – yet an administrative decision placed Slavoj Liberec, originally established as Čechie, in the First League. At the time, Slavoj had only played in the regional league. This reorganization created a lot of bad blood in Liberec. After one season, Slavoj was relegated to the second league. Three years later, Kolora once again fought its way up to be promoted to the First League, but the team could not manage to save themselves from relegation the following season.

=== Establishment of Slovan ===
In 1958, the decision was taken to close the Jiskra and Slavoj clubs and merge the two into a single team that would have the potential to win a spot in the First League. Although this plan stirred up very negative reactions among footballers and fans alike and despite the fact that members of Slavoj originally declared that they reject the plan, in the end they changed their minds. As a result, TJ Slovan Liberec was formed on 12 July 1958. With this name, the football club affirmed the Czech character of the club as well as the region where it played. The first competitor the newly created team faced was Spartak Praha Sokolovo, as the famous team Sparta Prague was called at the time. Slovan lost 0–3. Despite all its efforts, for a long time Slovan Liberec was unsuccessful in its fight for a place in the First League. At certain stages of its history, it was even relegated to the regional division or third league.

In the 1970s, Slovan managed to be promoted back to the second league, which at the time included five Bohemian, one Moravian and ten Slovak teams. Due to the vast distances, the footballers from Liberec even had to board planes to play against teams in Bardejov or Michalovce, located in the eastern parts of the country. In 1971, Slovan again failed in its attempt to be promoted to the First League. Following this were two relegations and promotions back to the second league.

=== Modern times ===
Slovan Liberec starting eleven before the Czech Cup final match against Sparta Prague, May 2008

After overcoming the financial crisis the club found itself in following the 1989 Velvet Revolution, Slovan Liberec finally had the chance to gain promotion to the top league. Following the dissolution of Czechoslovakia, the six best teams in the second league were elevated to the newly created Czech First League. Slovan ascended to the first league with the formation of the Czech First League in 1993, and has maintained this position ever since. In the 1990s, the club achieved a series of mid-table finishes.

In 2002, under the management of Ladislav Škorpil, Slovan Liberec became the first champions of the Czech Republic outside Prague. As Czech champions, the club entered the UEFA Champions League third qualifying round, but lost their first tie to that season's eventual tournament winners Milan (0–1, 2–1). Subsequently, the team finished fourth in the league in 2002–03. Due to a league-wide corruption scandal in the 2004–05 season, the club was penalised with a six-point deduction and finished in fifth position with 46 points. In the 2005–06 season, Slovan won their second league title.

In June 2007, popular coach Vítězslav Lavička resigned amidst problems with club management and disappointment with the team's Champions League qualification loss to Spartak Moscow. Liberec entered the UEFA Cup first round, where they defeated Serbian champions Red Star Belgrade before being eliminated in the group stage. Performances next season under coach Michal Zach would not meet the expectations of the club owners, and Slovan experienced one of the worst seasons in its modern history. Zach's replacement by former coach Ladislav Škorpil failed to remedy the situation, as the club finished sixth in the league. In the same season, the team reached the final of the Czech Cup, but lost in a penalty shootout against Sparta Prague.

The 2008–09 season began with bitter European defeat in the UEFA Cup, as Slovan lost their second qualifying round tie to Slovak club MŠK Žilina. By contrast, the club began their domestic league season with positive results against both of the dominant Prague sides, beating champions Slavia Prague 2–1 and Sparta Prague 3–0. However, a series of poor results against average opposition left the club down in fifth place by the fall. The spring saw Slovan opt for a more offensive approach and brought an improvement in results, with the club winning a derby against local rival Baumit Jablonec and beating an ambitious Mladá Boleslav side by three goals. Croatian striker Andrej Kerić scored 15 goals and became the league's top scorer as the club finished third, qualifying for the newly rebranded UEFA Europa League for the 2009–10 season. In the 2011–12 season, Slovan became league champions for the third time in club history.

On 2 April 2024, businessman Ondřej Kania bought 75.65 percent of the club from businessman Ludvík Karl and became his new owner. Former football player Jan Nezmar became the new general director and another former player, Theodor Gebre Selassie, became the new sporting director.

== Names and crest ==
Club crest used until 2024

Since TJ (Tělovýchovná jednota) Slovan Liberec was created in 1958, the club's name has been changed on numerous occasions, reflecting changes in sponsorship. In the 1980s, Slovan Liberec used the name TJ Slovan Elitex (a textile company) Liberec. In 1993, the name FC (Football Club) Slovan Liberec was announced, to be replaced later the same year with FC Slovan WSK Liberec (WSK was an abbreviation for Wimpey Severokámen). Only one year later in 1994, it became FC Slovan WSK Vratislav (Vratislav – a beer brand) Liberec. In 1995, Slovan returned to its former name, FC Slovan Liberec.

The crest represents the colours of Liberec (blue & white) and the mountain Ještěd near Liberec with its famous television tower on top.

== Players ==
=== Current squad ===
As of 8 September 2026

Note: Flags indicate national team as defined under FIFA eligibility rules; some limited exceptions apply. Players may hold more than one non-FIFA nationality.

No.	Pos.	Nation	Player
3	DF	CZE	Jan Mikula
5	DF	CZE	Petr Hodouš
6	DF	GEO	Aleko Basiladze
8	MF	CZE	Lukáš Masopust
9	FW	CZE	Lukáš Mašek
10	MF	KOS	Qëndrim Zyba
12	MF	CZE	Vojtěch Stránský
14	DF	TOG	Augustin Drakpe
15	MF	CZE	Milan Lexa
16	MF	CZE	Alexandr Bužek
17	FW	CZE	Petr Juliš
18	DF	CZE	Josef Koželuh
19	FW	CZE	Vasil Kušej
22	DF	CZE	Jan Knapík
23	DF	BIH	Haris Berbić

No.	Pos.	Nation	Player
24	MF	SVK	Patrik Dulay
25	FW	CZE	Matěj Mikulenka
26	DF	CZE	Jan Bořil
27	DF	UGA	Aziz Kayondo
28	MF	CZE	Vojtěch Sychra
29	DF	CZE	Lukáš Hůlka
30	DF	ZAM	David Hamansenya (on loan from Leganés)
31	GK	SVK	Dominik Kúdelčík
32	DF	CZE	Šimon Gabriel
33	GK	CZE	Lukáš Pešl
40	GK	CZE	Tomáš Koubek
60	MF	SEN	Fallou Faye
79	FW	SLO	Enej Marsetič
94	FW	CAF	Vénuste Baboula
99	FW	LAT	Raimonds Krollis

=== Out on loan ===
Note: Flags indicate national team as defined under FIFA eligibility rules; some limited exceptions apply. Players may hold more than one non-FIFA nationality.

No.	Pos.	Nation	Player
—	FW	CZE	Filip Špatenka (at Mladá Boleslav)
—	FW	SVK	Lukáš Letenay (at Mladá Boleslav)
—	GK	SVK	Ivan Krajčírik (at Ružomberok)
—	DF	SVK	Martin Rýzek (at Skalica)
—	MF	NGR	Johnson Dauda (at Novi Pazar)

No.	Pos.	Nation	Player
—	MF	NGR	Joel Yakubu (at Daugavpils)
—	DF	CZE	Dominik Mašek (at Česká Lípa)
—	FW	NGR	Patrick Edeh (at Česká Lípa)
—	MF	CZE	Hynek Hruška (at Kladno)
—	MF	NGR	Afolabi Soliu (at Zbrojovka Brno)

== Player records in the Czech First League ==
As of 18 September 2026.

Highlighted players are in the current squad.

=== Most appearances ===
#	Name	Matches
1	(Czech Republic) Tomáš Janů	310
2	(Czech Republic) Jan Mikula	248
3	(Czech Republic) Jan Nezmar	241
4	(Czech Republic) Petr Papoušek	219
5	(Czech Republic) Michael Rabušic	200
6	(Czech Republic) Miroslav Holeňák	184
7	(Czech Republic) Libor Janáček	183
8	(Czech Republic) Josef Lexa	175
9	(Czech Republic) Ladislav Maier	148
10	(Czech Republic) Jiří Štajner	143
10	(Slovakia) Ivan Hodúr	143
10	(Czech Republic) Theodor Gebre Selassie	143

=== Most goals ===
#	Name	Goals
1	(Czech Republic) Jan Nezmar	62
2	(Czech Republic) Jiří Štajner	57
3	(Czech Republic) Michael Rabušic	44
4	(Croatia) Andrej Kerić	32
5	(Argentina) Leandro Lázzaro	30
5	(Czech Republic) Josef Šural	30
7	(Czech Republic) Josef Obajdin	26
8	(Czech Republic) Petr Papoušek	24
9	(Czech Republic) Jan Blažek	23
10	(Czech Republic) Martin Barbarič	22

=== Most clean sheets ===
#	Name	Clean sheets
1	(Czech Republic) Ladislav Maier	50
2	(Czech Republic) Zbyněk Hauzr	49
3	(Czech Republic) Antonín Kinský	43

== Managers ==
- Vlastimil Petržela (1992–95)
- Ladislav Škorpil (1998–04)
- Josef Csaplár (2001–03)
- Stanislav Griga (Jan 2003 – June 2005)
- Vítězslav Lavička (2004–07)
- Michal Zach (July 2007 – Oct 2007)
- Ladislav Škorpil (Oct 2007 – Nov 2009)
- Josef Petřík (Nov 2009 – Nov 2010)
- Petr Rada (Nov 2010 – June 2011)
- Jaroslav Šilhavý (July 2011 – April 2014)
- David Vavruška (April 2014 – June 2014)
- Samuel Slovák (June 2014 – Dec 2014)
- Jiří Kotrba, Josef Csaplár (Dec 2014 – March 2015)
- David Vavruška (March 2015 – May 2015)
- Jindřich Trpišovský (June 2015 – Dec 2017)
- David Holoubek (Dec 2017 – May 2018)
- Zsolt Hornyák (June 2018 – May 2019)
- Pavel Hoftych (June 2019 – August 2021)
- Luboš Kozel (August 2021 – May 2024)
- Radoslav Kováč (June 2024 – June 2026)
- Branislav Fodrek (June 2026 – present)

== History in domestic competitions ==
- 1993– Czech First League

- Seasons spent at Level 1 of the football league system: 32
- Seasons spent at Level 2 of the football league system: 0
- Seasons spent at Level 3 of the football league system: 0
- Seasons spent at Level 4 of the football league system: 0

=== Czech Republic ===
Season	League	Placed	Pld	W	D	L	GF	GA	GD	Pts	Cup
1993–94	1. liga	9th	30	11	11	8	32	26	+6	44	Round of 16
1994–95	1. liga	4th	30	16	3	11	49	46	+3	51	Round of 32
1995–96	1. liga	7th	30	12	8	10	34	30	+4	44	Round of 32
1996–97	1. liga	5th	30	12	10	8	33	30	+3	46	Round of 16
1997–98	1. liga	5th	30	13	8	9	39	32	+7	47	Round of 64
1998–99	1. liga	9th	30	9	11	10	33	34	–1	38	Runners-up
1999–00	1. liga	8th	30	9	11	10	21	24	–3	38	Winners
2000–01	1. liga	6th	30	12	9	9	39	31	+8	45	Round of 16
2001–02	1. liga	1st	30	19	7	4	55	26	+29	64	Quarter-finals
2002–03	1. liga	4th	30	14	8	8	43	36	+7	50	Round of 16
2003–04	1. liga	6th	30	12	10	8	38	27	+11	46	Semi-finals
2004–05	1. liga	5th	30	14	10	6	45	26	+19	46†	Semi-finals
2005–06	1. liga	1st	30	16	11	3	43	22	+21	59	Round of 32
2006–07	1. liga	4th	30	16	10	4	44	22	+22	58	Round of 16
2007–08	1. liga	6th	30	12	8	10	35	31	+4	44	Runners-up
2008–09	1. liga	3rd	30	14	10	6	41	28	+13	52	Quarter-finals
2009–10	1. liga	9th	30	10	7	13	34	39	–5	37	Quarter-finals
2010–11	1. liga	7th	30	12	7	11	45	36	+9	43	Round of 32
2011–12	1. liga	1st	30	20	6	4	68	29	+39	66	Quarter-finals
2012–13	1. liga	3rd	30	16	6	8	46	34	+12	54	Semi-finals
2013–14	1. liga	4th	30	14	6	10	37	46	-9	48	Round of 32
2014–15	1. liga	12th	30	7	12	11	39	43	-4	33	Winners
2015–16	1. liga	3rd	30	17	7	6	51	35	+16	58	Quarter-finals
2016–17	1. liga	9th	30	10	9	11	31	28	+3	39	Quarter-finals
2017–18	1. liga	6th	30	13	7	10	37	35	+2	46	Quarter-finals
2018–19	1. liga	6th	35	12	10	13	34	32	+2	46	Quarter-finals
2019–20	1. liga	5th	36	16	6	14	57	51	+6	54	Runners-up
2020–21	1. liga	6th	34	14	10	10	44	32	+12	52	Quarter-finals
2021–22	1. liga	9th	32	10	7	15	29	41	-12	37	Round of 64
2022–23	1. liga	7th	34	12	8	14	51	49	+2	44	Quarter-finals
2023–24	1. liga	9th	32	10	10	12	47	50	-3	40	Quarter-finals
2024–25	1. liga	9th	32	12	9	11	47	35	+12	45	Round of 32
2025–26	1. liga	6th	35	12	10	13	45	39	+6	46	Round of 32

Notes: † six points deducted

== History in European competitions ==
Season	Competition	Round	Opponent	Home	Away	Aggregate
2000–01	UEFA Cup	1st Round	(Sweden) IFK Norrköping	2–1	2–2	4–3
2000–01	UEFA Cup	2nd Round	(England) Liverpool	2–3	0–1	2–4
2001–02	UEFA Cup	1st Round	(Slovakia) Slovan Bratislava	2–0	0–1	2–1
2001–02	UEFA Cup	2nd Round	(Spain) Celta Vigo	3–0	1–3	4–3
2001–02	UEFA Cup	3rd Round	(Spain) Mallorca	3–1	1–2	4–3
2001–02	UEFA Cup	4th Round	(France) Lyon	4–1	1–1	5–2
2001–02	UEFA Cup	1/4 Finals	(Germany) Borussia Dortmund	0–0	0–4	0–4
2002–03	UEFA Champions League	3rd Qual.	(Italy) Milan	2–1	0–1	2–2 (a)
2002–03	UEFA Cup	1st Round	(Georgia (country)) Dinamo Tbilisi	3–2	1–0	4–2
2002–03	UEFA Cup	2nd Round	(England) Ipswich Town	1–0	0–1	1–1 (4–2 p)
2002–03	UEFA Cup	3rd Round	(Greece) Panathinaikos	2–2	0–1	2–3
2003	Intertoto Cup	2nd Round	(Republic of Ireland) Shamrock Rovers	2–0	2–0	4–0
2003	Intertoto Cup	3rd Round	(Spain) Racing Santander	2–1	1–0	3–1
2003	Intertoto Cup	Semi-finals	(Germany) Schalke 04	0–0	1–2	1–2
2004	Intertoto Cup	2nd Round	(Slovakia) FK ZTS Dubnica	5–0	2–1	7–1
2004	Intertoto Cup	3rd Round	(Netherlands) Roda JC	1–0	1–1 (a.e.t.)	2–1
2004	Intertoto Cup	Semi-finals	(France) Nantes	1–0	1–2	2–2 (a)
2004	Intertoto Cup	Finals	(Germany) Schalke 04	0–1	1–2	1–3
2005	Intertoto Cup	2nd Round	(Israel) Beitar Jerusalem	5–1	2–1	7–2
2005	Intertoto Cup	3rd Round	(Netherlands) Roda JC	1–1	0–0	1–1 (a)
2006–07	UEFA Champions League	3rd Qual.	(Russia) Spartak Moscow	0–0	1–2	1–2
2006–07	UEFA Cup	1st Round	(Serbia) Red Star Belgrade	2–0	2–1	4–1
2006–07	UEFA Cup	Group C	(Spain) Sevilla	0–0	—N/a	4nd
2006–07	UEFA Cup	Group C	(Portugal) Braga	—N/a	0–4	4nd
2006–07	UEFA Cup	Group C	(Switzerland) Grasshoppers	4–1	—N/a	4nd
2006–07	UEFA Cup	Group C	(Netherlands) AZ	—N/a	2–2	4nd
2007	Intertoto Cup	2nd Round	(Kazakhstan) Tobol	0–2	1–1	1–3
2008–09	UEFA Cup	2nd Qual.	(Slovakia) Žilina	1–2	1–2	2–4
2009–10	UEFA Europa League	3rd Qual.	(Liechtenstein) Vaduz	2–0	1–0	3–0
2009–10	UEFA Europa League	Play-off	(Romania) Dinamo București	0–3	3–0 (c)	3–3 (8–9 p)
2012–13	UEFA Champions League	2nd Qual.	(Kazakhstan) Shakhter Karagandy	1–0	1–1 (a.e.t.)	2–1
2012–13	UEFA Champions League	3rd Qual.	(Romania) CFR Cluj	1–2	0–1	1–3
2012–13	UEFA Europa League	Play-off	(Ukraine) Dnipro Dnipropetrovsk	2–4	2–2	4–6
2013–14	UEFA Europa League	2nd Qual.	(Latvia) Skonto	1–0	1–2	2–2 (a)
2013–14	UEFA Europa League	3rd Qual.	(Switzerland) Zürich	2–1	2–1	4–2
2013–14	UEFA Europa League	Play-off	(Italy) Udinese	1–1	3–1	4–2
2013–14	UEFA Europa League	Group H	(Germany) SC Freiburg	1–2	2–2	2nd
2013–14	UEFA Europa League	Group H	(Portugal) Estoril	2–1	2–1	2nd
2013–14	UEFA Europa League	Group H	(Spain) Sevilla	1–1	1–1	2nd
2013–14	UEFA Europa League	Round of 32	(Netherlands) AZ	0–1	1–1	1–2
2014–15	UEFA Europa League	2nd Qual.	(Slovakia) MFK Košice	3–0	1–0	4–0
2014–15	UEFA Europa League	3rd Qual.	(Romania) Astra Giurgiu	2–3	0–3	2–6
2015–16	UEFA Europa League	3rd Qual.	(Israel) Ironi Kiryat Shmona	2–1	3–0	5–1
2015–16	UEFA Europa League	Play-off	(Croatia) Hajduk Split	1–0	1–0	2–0
2015–16	UEFA Europa League	Group F	(Portugal) Braga	0–1	1–2	3rd
2015–16	UEFA Europa League	Group F	(France) Marseille	2–4	1–0	3rd
2015–16	UEFA Europa League	Group F	(Netherlands) Groningen	1–1	1–0	3rd
2016–17	UEFA Europa League	3rd Qual.	(Austria) Admira Wacker Mödling	2–0	2–1	4–1
2016–17	UEFA Europa League	Play–off	(Cyprus) AEK Larnaca	3–0	1–0	4–0
2016–17	UEFA Europa League	Group J	(Italy) Fiorentina	1–3	0–3	4nd
2016–17	UEFA Europa League	Group J	(Greece) PAOK	1–2	0–2	4nd
2016–17	UEFA Europa League	Group J	(Azerbaijan) Qarabağ	3–0	2–2	4nd
2020–21	UEFA Europa League	2nd Qual.	(Lithuania) Riteriai	—N/a	5−1	5−1
2020–21	UEFA Europa League	3rd Qual.	(Romania) FCSB	—N/a	2−0	2−0
2020–21	UEFA Europa League	Play-off	(Cyprus) APOEL	1–0	—N/a	1–0
2020–21	UEFA Europa League	Group L	(Belgium) Gent	1–0	2–1	3rd
2020–21	UEFA Europa League	Group L	(Serbia) Red Star Belgrade	0–0	1–5	3rd
2020–21	UEFA Europa League	Group L	(Germany) 1899 Hoffenheim	0–2	0–5	3rd

== Honours ==
- Czech First League
  - Winners (3): 2001–02, 2005–06, 2011–12
- Czech Cup
  - Winners (2): 1999–2000, 2014–15
- UEFA Intertoto Cup
  - Runners-up: 2004

== Club records ==
=== Czech First League records ===
- Best position: 1st (2001–02, 2005–06, 2011–12)
- Worst position: 12th (2014–15)
- Biggest home win: Liberec 6–0 Ostrava (2014–15), Liberec 6–0 Karviná (2025–26)
- Biggest away win: Benešov 0–5 Liberec (1994–95)
- Biggest home defeat: Liberec 0–5 Olomouc (2009–10), Liberec 0–5 Sparta (2021–22)
- Biggest away defeat: Sparta 7–1 Liberec (1994–95), Plzeň 6–0 Liberec (2013–14)
