= 2011–12 TFF Third League =

TFF Third League
- Season: 2011–12
- Champions: TBD
- Promoted: TBD
- Relegated: TBD
- Top goalscorer: TBD
- Biggest home win: TBD
- Biggest away win: TBD
- Highest scoring: TBD

The 2011–12 TFF Third League (also known as Spor-Toto Third League due to sponsorship reasons) is the 11th season of the league since its establishment in 2001 as the fourth level division; and the 41st season of the third league in Turkish football since its establishment in 1967–68 (before 2001 league was played as third level division). The start date of the league is 28 August 2011 and end date is 13 May 2012.

League was started with 54 teams in three groups: Groups 1, 2 and 3, each consisting of 18 teams. Winner of each group will promote to 2012–13 TFF Second League. A playoff series will be played among the best four teams in each group to determine the three more teams to promote. Bottom three teams in each groups will relegate to 2012–13 Regional Amateur League.

== Teams ==
Locations of teams in the 2011–12 TFF Third League.
Key: Black – Group 1, White – Group 2, Red – Group 3

== Team summaries ==
Team	Group	Location	Stadium	Capacity	President	Coach
Afyonkarahisarspor	3	Afyonkarahisar	Afyon Atatürk Stadium	10,000	Hikmet Bülbül	Mustafa Meteertem
Akçaabat Sebatspor	1	Trabzon	Akçaabat Fatih Stadium	6,238	Zeki Öztürk	A. Kemal Özcan
Anadolu Üsküdar 1908	3	Istanbul	Vefa Stadium	6,500	Murat Şahin	Tarık Yurttaş
Ankara Demirspor	3	Ankara	Cebeci İnönü Stadium	37,000	Nuğman Yavuz	Semih Tokatlı
Araklıspor	3	Trabzon	Araklı İlçe Stadium	1,364	Reşat Çebi	Halit Yakupoğlu
Arsinspor	2	Trabzon	Arsin İlçe Stadium	1,300	Mustafa Keleş	Orhan Cinemre
Aydınspor 1923	3	Aydın			Ahmet Gümüş	Tevfik Ata Tekin
Batman Petrolspor	2	Batman	Batman 16 Mayıs Stadium	4,900	Süleyman Çalık	Metin Şimşek
Bayrampaşaspor	1	Istanbul	Çetin Emeç Stadium	3,200	Şafak Aydın Silin	Ergun Ortakçı
Belediye Bingölspor	2	Bingöl	Bingöl Şehir Stadium	3,000	Şerafettin Varolgüneş	Nihat Balan
Belediye Vanspor	1	Van	Van Atatürk Stadium	10,500	Nihat Gezici	Tolgay Kerimoğlu
Beşikdüzüspor	1	Trabzon			İmdat Çıtlak	Gökhan Uzungüngör
Beylerbeyi	3	Istanbul	Beylerbeyi 75. Yıl Stadium	5,500	Mustafa Yazıcı	Şeref Özşan
Bursa Nilüferspor	3	Bursa	Nilüfer Stadium	0	Nevzat Tuna	Kudret Kar
Çanakkale Dardanelspor	3	Çanakkale	18 Mart Stadium	10,500	Osman Niyazi Önen	Nevzat Kulusoğlu
Çarşambaspor	3	Samsun			Hasan Özcan	İbrahim Hancı
Darıca Gençlerbirliği	3	Kocaeli	Darıca İlçe Stadium	6,500	Halil Akbaşoğlu	Halit Üçkaleler
Diyarbakır BB	1	Diyarbakır	Seyrantepe Diski Spor Tesisleri	1,540	Haci Haspolat	Nurettin Şiro
Dört Eylül Belediyespor	2	Sivas	Sivas 4 Eylül Stadium	14,998	Ahmet Polat	Ömer Ateş
Elazığ Belediyespor	1	Elazığ	Doğukent Çim Saha	500		Nafiz Orak
Erganispor	2	Diyarbakır			Rifat Yılmaz	Şadan Üzülmez
Erzurum Büyükşehir Belediyespor	3	Erzurum	Cemal Gürsel Stadium	17,000	Mehmet Aydın	Hasan Çelik
Gebzespor	1	Kocaeli	Gebze İlçe Stadium	8,000	Caner Pesen	Şükrü Köksal
Gölcükspor	2	Kocaeli	Gölcük Şehir Stadium		İsmail Gençdemir	Metin Peken
Gümüşhanespor	1	Gümüşhane	Gümüşhane Yenişehir Stadium	4,000	Kurban Karagöz	A.R. Sinan Bayraktar
Hacettepe	1	Ankara	Cebeci İnönü Stadium	37,000	Subhi Acar Yalçınkaya	Tarık Daşgün
Hatayspor	3	Hatay	Hatay Atatürk Stadium	6,015	Hikmet Çinçin	İsmail Batur
İnegölspor	1	Bursa	İnegöl İlçe Stadium	4,975	İlhan Korkmaz	Taşkın Güngör
İskenderunspor 1967	2	Hatay	5 Temmuz Stadium	12,390	Sedat Uysal	Mehmet Kurt
İstanbulspor	2	Istanbul	Bahçelievler İl Özel İdare	4,350	Ömer Sarıalioğlu	Mehmet Erdal Alpaslan
Kahramanmaraşspor	2	Kahramanmaraş	Hanefi Mahçiçek Stadium	9,169	Ferudun Kolat	Orhan Şerit
Karsspor	2	Kars	Kars Şehir Stadium	5,000	Muzaffer Sanğu	Bülent Topuzoğlu
Kastamonuspor	1	Kastamonu	Kastamonu Gazi Stadium	4,033	Levent Özbek	Cemal Çıldır
Kayapınar Belediyespor	3	Diyarbakır	Seyrantepe 1 nolu saha	500	Murat Kaçar	Ali Ravcı
Keçiörengücü	2	Ankara	Ankara Aktepe Stadium	4,883	Sedat Tahiroğlu	Tahir Çopur
Keçiören Sportif	1	Ankara	Yenimahalle Hasan Doğan Stadium		Halit Öngün	Murat Küçük
Kepez Belediyespor	2	Antalya	Hasan Doğan Stadium		Ahmet Ünlüoğlu	Ahmet kılıç
Kırıkhanspor	1	Hatay	İskenderun 5 Temmuz Stadium	12,390	Halil Yılmaz	Ahmet Taşyürek
Kilimli Belediyespor	2	Zonguldak	Kilimli İlçe Stadium	5,000	Engin Aygün	Raşit Çalık
Küçükçekmecespor	2	Istanbul			Ahmet Kurşun	Ferhat Kurtul
Lüleburgazspor	1	Kırklareli	Lüleburgaz 8 Kasım Stadium	2,500	Siyami Aslan	Şevket Candar
Maltepespor	2	Istanbul	Maltepe Hasan Polat Stadium	5,000	Nuri Erkoç	Atakan Çağlayan
Manavgat Evrensekispor	1	Antalya			Musa Şehirli	Kamil Atalay
Menemen Belediyespor	1	İzmir	Menemen Şehir Stadium	2,000	Armağan Öktenoğlu	Mehmet Atila Özcan
MKE Kırıkkalespor	1	Kırıkkale	Fikret Karabudak Stadium	5,402	Ali Koç Uzel	Harun Aydoslu
Nazilli Belediyespor	2	Aydın	Nazilli İlçe Stadium	4,500	Vahit Aysan	Mustafa Ceviz
Orhangazispor	2	Bursa	Orhangazi İlçe Stadium	0	Hasan Aydın	Soner Büyükergun
Oyak Renaultspor	2	Bursa	Oyak Renault Stadium	3,000	Alpay Şar	Nurgut Ak
Pazarspor	3	Rize	Pazar İlçe Stadium	2,442	Hüseyin Yangın	Erdem Acar
Sancaktepe Belediyespor	3	Istanbul	S.B. Hakan Şükür Stadium		Muhammed Ali Cankatar	Furkan Şükürcü
Sandıklı Belediyespor	1	Afyon			Adem Şeker	Hakan Hayati Karaca
Siirtspor	3	Siirt	Siirt Atatürk Stadium	5,650	Mehmet Fadıl Akgündüz	Ramazan Silin
Tarsus İdmanyurdu	3	Mersin	Tarsus Burhanettin Kocamaz Stadium	4,201	İsmail Akdağcık	Yüksel Yeşilova
Tekirova Belediyespor	3	Antalya	Dr. Fehmi Öncel Stadium		Fahri Şimşek	Murat Gürkan Zora
Ümraniyespor	1	Istanbul			Recep Yoğurtçu	Kenan Gönen
Trabzon Yalıspor	2	Trabzon	Yavuz Selim Stadium	1,820	Muhammed Kara	Hasan Çolak
Yimpaş Yozgatspor	3	Yozgat	Yozgat Bozok Stadium	8,260	İbrahim Yılmaz	Harun Dişlitaş

Note: Last updated on 11 September 2011 from TFF official website.

== Group 1 ==
=== Group 1 league table ===
Pos	Team	Pld	W	D	L	GF	GA	GD	Pts	Qualification or relegation
1	İnegölspor (P)	36	22	11	3	62	19	+43	77	Promotion to 2. Lig
2	Bayrampaşaspor (Q)	36	21	8	7	61	28	+33	71	Qualification for Promotion Playoffs
3	Amed (Q)	36	19	10	7	57	30	+27	67	Qualification for Promotion Playoffs
4	Hacettepe Spor (Q)	36	18	10	8	60	38	+22	64	Qualification for Promotion Playoffs
5	Gümüşhanespor (Q)	36	17	12	7	46	37	+9	63	Qualification for Promotion Playoffs
6	Manavgat Evrensekispor	36	18	7	11	52	33	+19	61	
7	Menemen Belediye Spor	36	16	8	12	49	40	+9	56	
8	Van BB	36	15	8	13	47	39	+8	53	
9	Beşikdüzüspor	36	14	11	11	42	38	+4	53	
10	Yeni Sandıklıspor	36	14	11	11	55	41	+14	50 (Note: 3 points deducted)	
11	Kastamonuspor	36	13	10	13	38	42	−4	49	
12	Kırıkhanspor	36	13	9	14	47	48	−1	48	
13	Ümraniyespor	36	14	4	18	52	54	−2	46	
14	Elazığ Belediyespor	36	10	13	13	41	46	−5	43	
15	Gebzespor	36	10	7	19	36	61	−25	37	
16	MKE Kırıkkalespor (R)	36	9	7	20	33	60	−27	34	Relegation to Regional Amateur League
17	Lüleburgazspor (R)	36	6	15	15	27	44	−17	33	Relegation to Regional Amateur League
18	Keçiören Sportif (R)	36	5	10	21	31	52	−21	25	Relegation to Regional Amateur League
19	Akçaabat Sebatspor (R)	36	2	1	33	19	105	−86	7	Relegation to Regional Amateur League

Updated to match(es) played on 13 May 2012. Source: TFF Third League page
Rules for classification: 1) points; 2) goal difference; 3) number of goals scored.
(P) Promoted; (Q) Qualified for the phase indicated; (R) Relegated

=== Group 1 positions by round ===
Team ╲ Round	1	2	3	4	5	6	7	8	9	10	11	12	13	14	15	16	17	18	19	20	21	22	23	24	25	26	27	28	29	30	31	32	33	34
Akçaabat Sebatspor	19	19	19	19	19	19	19	19	19	19	19	19	19	19	19	19	19	19	19	19	19	19	19	19	19	19	19	19	19	19	19	19	19	19
Bayrampaşaspor	11	5	8	6	6	6	6	4	2	4	4	3	3	3	3	3	3	3	4	5	5	5	5	3	2	2	2	2	2	2	2	2	2	2
Van BB	2	9	11	12	12	12	12	11	14	14	13	11	11	11	11	9	9	9	12	10	10	10	10	8	11	11	11	11	11	11	11	9	9	8
Beşikdüzüspor	4	2	3	10	10	10	10	10	11	13	14	7	7	7	7	10	10	10	13	12	12	12	12	10	13	13	13	13	13	10	10	11	10	9
Amed	1	1	1	4	4	4	4	9	9	5	7	8	8	8	8	5	5	5	3	2	2	2	2	2	3	3	3	3	3	3	3	4	5	3
Elazığ Belediyespor	9	11	6	5	5	5	5	5	7	6	8	12	12	12	12	11	11	11	10	11	11	11	11	12	9	9	9	9	9	12	12	13	13	14
Gebzespor	16	17	18	17	17	17	17	17	17	17	18	18	18	18	18	18	18	18	18	17	17	17	17	17	17	17	17	17	17	17	17	17	17	15
Gümüşhanespor	8	10	7	7	7	7	7	6	8	12	10	13	13	13	13	12	12	12	11	8	8	8	8	5	4	4	4	4	4	5	5	6	4	5
Hacettepe Spor	3	8	5	8	8	8	8	8	4	3	3	2	2	2	2	2	2	2	2	4	4	4	4	6	5	5	5	5	5	4	4	3	3	4
İnegölspor	12	4	2	1	1	1	1	1	1	1	1	1	1	1	1	1	1	1	1	1	1	1	1	1	1	1	1	1	1	1	1	1	1	1
Kastamonuspor	6	3	4	2	2	2	2	2	5	7	9	10	10	10	10	8	8	8	7	9	9	9	9	11	10	10	10	10	10	9	9	10	12	11
Keçiören Sportif	10	16	17	18	18	18	18	18	18	18	17	17	17	17	17	17	17	17	17	18	18	18	18	18	18	18	18	18	18	18	18	18	18	18
Kırıkhanspor	18	18	16	13	13	13	13	13	12	11	11	9	9	9	9	14	14	14	9	14	14	14	14	14	12	12	12	12	12	13	13	12	11	12
Lüleburgazspor	5	6	9	15	15	15	15	15	16	16	16	16	16	16	16	16	16	16	15	15	15	15	15	15	15	15	15	15	15	16	16	16	16	17
Manavgat Evrensekispor	17	7	12	3	3	3	3	3	6	8	6	6	6	6	6	7	7	7	8	7	7	7	7	9	8	8	8	8	8	6	6	5	6	6
Menemen Belediye Spor	14	13	10	11	11	11	11	12	10	9	5	5	5	5	5	6	6	6	6	3	3	3	3	4	7	7	7	7	7	8	8	8	8	7
MKE Kırıkkalespor	7	15	15	14	14	14	14	14	13	10	12	15	15	15	15	15	15	15	16	16	16	16	16	16	16	16	16	16	16	15	15	15	15	16
Ümraniyespor	15	14	14	16	16	16	16	16	15	15	15	14	14	14	14	13	13	13	14	13	13	13	13	13	14	14	14	14	14	14	14	14	14	13
Yeni Sandıklıspor	13	12	13	9	9	9	9	7	3	2	2	4	4	4	4	4	4	4	5	6	6	6	6	7	6	6	6	6	6	7	7	7	7	10

Source: TFF Third League page

=== Group 1 results ===
Home \ Away	AÇS	BYR	VAN	BŞZ	ASK	EZB	GBZ	GMH	HAC	ING	KAS	KSP	KRH	LBS	MEV	MBS	MKE	ÜMR	YSD
Akçaabat Sebatspor		0–3	1–2	0–2	0–2	1–3	0–1	0–1	1–4	0–3	0–2	0–0	0–1	0–1	4–0	0–5	0–1	0–1	1–6
Bayrampaşaspor	4–0		2–0	0–2	0–0	1–0	2–1	0–0	4–1	0–4	3–1	1–0	1–2	3–0	3–1	1–1	3–1	3–2	2–3
Van BB	3–0	0–1		2–2	1–2	2–1	4–3	0–2	2–1	1–3	1–2	2–1	3–0	2–1	2–0	3–1	3–1	0–1	1–1
Beşikdüzüspor	1–2	2–1	0–0		0–1	3–0	0–1	1–1	1–2	0–0	0–0	1–0	0–0	2–1	1–0	2–1	2–2	2–0	1–0
Amed	8–0	1–0	0–0	2–0		4–0	1–1	2–0	1–1	0–0	2–0	1–0	3–2	1–0	0–1	3–2	3–0	2–2	0–0
Elazığ Belediyespor	3–2	1–1	1–1	3–2	1–2		1–2	2–2	0–1	0–1	2–1	1–1	3–1	1–1	1–2	0–0	3–2	0–0	1–0
Gebzespor	3–0	1–3	1–3	0–1	3–1	1–3		0–2	3–3	0–0	1–0	1–1	1–1	0–1	1–2	0–0	0–0	0–6	2–1
Gümüşhanespor	3–2	0–3	1–0	1–1	0–0	1–1	2–1		1–0	1–1	2–1	4–3	2–0	3–1	4–1	1–0	1–0	0–0	0–2
Hacettepe Spor	3–1	0–0	1–2	1–0	2–1	2–1	1–0	1–2		0–1	4–1	0–2	1–1	2–0	3–1	3–1	2–0	4–1	1–1
İnegölspor	6–0	0–0	1–1	1–0	2–1	1–1	3–0	3–0	1–0		5–1	1–0	2–1	2–2	3–1	1–3	1–0	4–2	2–0
Kastamonuspor	4–0	1–1	1–1	2–1	2–2	0–0	2–0	1–0	2–3	0–0		2–1	2–1	1–1	0–1	1–0	0–3	2–0	1–0
Keçiören Sportif	3–0	1–2	1–0	2–2	1–2	2–1	0–1	1–1	0–2	1–3	2–1		0–1	0–1	0–1	1–2	1–1	0–2	1–2
Kırıkhanspor	2–1	0–2	1–0	1–2	0–1	3–1	5–1	1–1	1–1	0–1	0–1	2–2		4–1	1–0	3–0	1–0	0–0	1–1
Lüleburgazspor	2–0	0–2	0–1	0–0	0–0	0–0	3–1	0–2	2–2	0–0	0–0	1–1	1–2		0–0	1–1	0–0	3–2	1–1
Manavgat Evrensekispor	6–1	1–0	0–0	5–1	4–1	1–0	3–0	1–2	0–0	0–0	0–0	4–0	2–0	0–0		0–0	3–0	3–0	1–2
Menemen Belediye Spor	5–0	0–3	1–0	4–1	1–2	0–0	1–0	2–2	1–1	1–0	1–0	3–0	2–1	1–0	0–2		2–0	3–2	2–1
MKE Kırıkkalespor	3–0	0–2	0–2	2–2	0–0	0–2	1–2	1–0	1–5	0–3	4–0	1–1	2–3	2–0	0–2	2–0		0–3	1–0
Ümraniyespor	2–1	1–4	2–1	0–2	2–1	1–2	1–2	3–0	1–2	0–2	0–1	1–0	3–2	3–1	1–2	1–2	1–2		2–1
Yeni Sandıklıspor	6–1	0–0	2–1	0–2	2–1	1–1	3–1	1–1	0–0	2–1	0–0	1–1	2–2	2–1	2–1	2–0	7–0	0–3	

Updated to match(es) played on 13 May 2012. Source: TFF Third League page
Legend: Blue = home team win; Yellow = draw; Red = away team win.

=== Group 1 top goalscorers ===
Including matches played on 9 August 2011;
Source: TFF Third League page

Rank	Scorer	Club	Goals
1	(Turkey)		
2	(Turkey)		
3	(Turkey)		
4	(Turkey)		
5	(Turkey)		
6	(Turkey)		
7	(Turkey)		
8	(Turkey)		
9	(Turkey)		
10	(Turkey)		

== Group 2 ==
=== Group 2 league table ===
Pos	Team	Pld	W	D	L	GF	GA	GD	Pts	Qualification or relegation
1	Nazilli Belediyespor (P)	36	25	3	8	67	24	+43	78	Promotion to 2. Lig
2	Keçiörengücü (Q)	36	19	7	10	71	35	+36	64	Qualification for Promotion Playoffs
3	Belediye Bingölspor (Q)	36	17	13	6	49	28	+21	64	Qualification for Promotion Playoffs
4	Trabzon Yalıspor (Q)	36	17	12	7	42	31	+11	63	Qualification for Promotion Playoffs
5	Kahramanmaraşspor A.Ş. (Q)	36	17	10	9	62	42	+20	61	Qualification for Promotion Playoffs
6	Batman Petrolspor	36	16	12	8	42	32	+10	60	
7	İstanbulspor	36	15	12	9	50	30	+20	57	
8	Dört Eylül Belediyespor	36	13	10	13	50	47	+3	49	
9	Gölcükspor	36	10	17	9	33	32	+1	47	
10	Maltepe	36	12	9	15	53	58	−5	45	
11	Yeni İskenderunspor	36	11	10	15	47	58	−11	43	
12	Orhangazispor	36	9	15	12	44	47	−3	42	
13	Kilimli Belediyespor	36	10	12	14	40	51	−11	42	
14	Oyak Renaultspor	36	9	14	13	36	41	−5	41	
15	Arsinspor	36	8	17	11	37	43	−6	41	
16	Karsspor (R)	36	10	10	16	45	55	−10	40	Relegation to Regional Amateur League
17	Küçükçekmece (R)	36	9	13	14	40	54	−14	40	Relegation to Regional Amateur League
18	Kepez Belediyespor (R)	36	5	12	19	28	72	−44	27	Relegation to Regional Amateur League
19	Erganispor (R)	36	2	8	26	18	74	−56	14	Relegation to Regional Amateur League

Updated to match(es) played on 13 May 2012. Source: TFF Third League page
Rules for classification: 1) points; 2) goal difference; 3) number of goals scored.
(P) Promoted; (Q) Qualified for the phase indicated; (R) Relegated

=== Group 2 positions by round ===
Team ╲ Round	1	2	3	4	5	6	7	8	9	10	11	12	13	14	15	16	17	18	19	20	21	22	23	24	25	26	27	28	29	30	31	32	33	34
Arsinspor	15	17	16	15	15	15	15	15	11	9	9	10	11	11	11	11	11	11	11	11	11	11	11	13	15	15	15	15	15	15	15	15	15	15
Batman Petrolspor	5	2	2	2	2	2	2	3	3	2	2	3	3	3	3	3	3	4	4	2	2	2	2	2	6	6	6	6	6	6	6	7	7	6
Belediye Bingölspor	14	18	13	8	8	8	8	10	12	11	11	9	8	8	8	8	8	7	7	7	7	7	7	6	2	2	2	2	2	2	2	2	3	3
Dört Eylül Belediyespor	11	12	9	3	3	3	3	4	6	8	8	8	9	9	9	9	9	9	9	9	9	9	9	8	8	8	8	8	8	8	8	8	8	8
Erganispor	1	5	10	9	9	9	9	13	15	16	16	17	19	19	19	19	19	19	19	19	19	19	19	19	19	19	19	19	19	19	19	19	19	19
Gölcükspor	3	6	5	10	10	10	10	11	13	13	13	13	17	17	17	17	17	16	16	10	10	10	10	10	9	9	9	9	9	9	9	9	9	9
İstanbulspor	18	11	4	5	5	5	5	2	5	6	6	5	5	5	5	5	5	3	5	5	5	5	5	4	5	5	5	5	5	5	5	5	6	7
Kahramanmaraşspor A.Ş.	2	10	12	7	7	7	7	6	4	3	3	2	4	4	4	4	4	5	3	6	6	6	6	5	4	4	4	4	4	4	4	4	4	5
Karsspor	17	16	18	19	19	19	19	19	19	19	19	19	18	18	18	18	18	18	18	16	16	16	16	14	13	13	13	13	13	13	13	14	14	16
Keçiörengücü	8	3	7	11	11	11	11	8	7	4	4	4	2	2	2	2	2	2	2	3	3	3	3	3	3	3	3	3	3	3	3	3	2	2
Kepez Belediyespor	7	14	15	16	16	16	16	12	14	15	15	16	15	15	15	15	15	17	17	17	17	17	17	15	18	18	18	18	18	18	18	18	18	18
Kilimli Belediyespor	10	9	11	6	6	6	6	7	8	7	7	7	10	10	10	10	10	10	10	15	15	15	15	16	12	12	12	12	12	12	12	12	12	13
Küçükçekmece	19	19	17	14	14	14	14	17	16	14	14	14	13	13	13	13	13	12	12	13	13	13	13	12	17	17	17	17	17	17	17	17	16	17
Maltepe	6	13	14	18	18	18	18	16	18	18	18	15	12	12	12	12	12	14	13	12	12	12	12	11	11	11	11	11	11	11	11	11	11	10
Nazilli Belediyespor	4	1	1	1	1	1	1	1	1	1	1	1	1	1	1	1	1	1	1	1	1	1	1	1	1	1	1	1	1	1	1	1	1	1
Orhangazispor	16	15	19	17	17	17	17	18	17	17	17	18	14	14	14	14	14	13	14	14	14	14	14	17	14	14	14	14	14	14	14	13	13	12
Oyak Renaultspor	13	7	6	12	12	12	12	14	10	12	12	12	16	16	16	16	16	15	15	18	18	18	18	18	16	16	16	16	16	16	16	16	17	14
Trabzon Yalıspor	12	4	8	13	13	13	13	9	9	10	10	11	7	7	7	7	7	6	6	4	4	4	4	7	7	7	7	7	7	7	7	6	5	4
Yeni İskenderunspor	9	8	3	4	4	4	4	5	2	5	5	6	6	6	6	6	6	8	8	8	8	8	8	9	10	10	10	10	10	10	10	10	10	11

Source: TFF Third League page

=== Group 2 results ===
Home \ Away	ARS	BPT	BNG	DEB	ERG	GLC	IST	KMS	KAR	KEG	KPZ	KLB	KÇM	MTP	NBS	OGZ	OYK	YLS	YIS
Arsinspor		1–2		3–3	0–0	0–0	1–2	1–0	2–2	0–1	0–0	0–0	0–0	1–1	1–2		2–1		1–0
Batman Petrolspor	2–2		1–0	1–1	3–2	1–1	0–2	1–0	4–0	1–0		3–1	1–0	0–1	1–3	0–0	1–1	0–1	2–2
Belediye Bingölspor	0–0	3–0		0–0	3–1		1–1		2–0	3–0	3–0	1–0	4–1	2–0	1–0	2–0	0–0	1–1	3–0
Dört Eylül Belediyespor	3–1	1–2	1–1		3–1		3–2	3–2	2–3	1–2	2–0	0–0	1–2	3–1	1–0	0–1	2–1		1–1
Erganispor	0–2	0–0	0–1	1–3		1–2	1–2	0–2	1–0	0–3	1–1	0–1	3–0	1–2		0–5	1–2		1–4
Gölcükspor	1–1	1–2	1–3	3–2	0–0		0–0	1–1	1–1	0–2	1–1	0–1	1–1	1–1	3–1	0–0	1–0	0–1	
İstanbulspor	1–1		0–0	1–1	4–0	1–1		2–1	1–1		3–0	1–1	0–0	2–0	0–2	0–0	5–0	2–1	1–0
Kahramanmaraşspor A.Ş.	1–1	0–1	2–0	2–1	2–0	0–0	1–0		2–0		4–1		4–2	5–4	0–1	3–1	0–2	5–0	1–0
Karsspor	2–0	1–1	0–2	1–2	8–0	0–2	0–2	1–2		2–1	2–3	1–1			1–0	0–0	1–0	3–1	2–0
Keçiörengücü		0–1	5–0	1–0	4–0	0–1	2–1	0–0	6–1		5–0	3–1	5–0	4–1	1–0	1–1	2–0	2–0	6–1
Kepez Belediyespor	0–4	1–1	1–2	0–3	0–0	0–1	0–1	1–2	3–2	3–3		2–1	0–0	2–2			3–1	0–0	1–5
Kilimli Belediyespor	3–1	0–1		0–2	1–0	0–1	0–4	2–2	2–2	1–1	4–1		2–1	1–1	1–2	2–4	2–0		1–1
Küçükçekmece	1–3	2–2	2–0		0–0	2–1	1–1	2–2	3–1	1–2	1–1	2–1		1–3	1–0	2–2	0–2	0–1	5–1
Maltepe	4–1	0–0	1–3	4–0		2–3	2–3	2–2	1–0	2–1	0–0	3–1	3–1		0–1	1–3	0–2	2–1	0–0
Nazilli Belediyespor	3–0	2–0	1–1	3–0	1–0	3–1	1–0	2–1	4–0	3–2	3–0	2–0	2–0	2–0		4–0		2–0	3–2
Orhangazispor	0–0	0–2	3–3	0–1	3–0				0–0	1–1		1–2	1–1	1–2	0–0		1–1	0–2	2–1
Oyak Renaultspor	0–0		0–0	1–1	1–1	0–0	2–1	2–3	1–2	2–3	2–0	0–0	0–0		1–1	1–2		0–0	1–2
Trabzon Yalıspor	0–0	1–1	1–2	1–0	2–1	1–0	2–1	2–0		0–0	3–0	0–0	0–0	3–2	1–0	2–0	2–2		2–1
Yeni İskenderunspor	3–0	1–0	3–1	1–1	0–0	1–0	1–1	2–2	2–1	3–0	0–2	0–2		2–0	1–5	3–2	0–0	2–2	

Updated to match(es) played on 22 April 2012. Source: TFF Third League page
Legend: Blue = home team win; Yellow = draw; Red = away team win.

=== Group 2 top goalscorers ===
Including matches played on 9 August 2011;
Source: TFF Third League page

Rank	Scorer	Club	Goals
1	(Turkey)		
2	(Turkey)		
3	(Turkey)		
4	(Turkey)		
5	(Turkey)		
6	(Turkey)		
7	(Turkey)		
8	(Turkey)		
9	(Turkey)		
10	(Turkey)		

== Group 3 ==
=== Group 3 league table ===
Pos	Team	Pld	W	D	L	GF	GA	GD	Pts	Qualification or relegation
1	Hatayspor	33	19	6	8	49	26	+23	63	Promotion to 2. Lig
2	Tarsus İ.Y.	33	18	5	10	52	34	+18	59	Qualification for Promotion Playoffs
3	Bursa Nilüferspor	33	14	12	7	48	33	+15	54	Qualification for Promotion Playoffs
4	Sancaktepe Belediyespor	33	14	10	9	47	36	+11	52	Qualification for Promotion Playoffs
5	Darıca Gençlerbirliği	34	14	10	10	48	38	+10	52	Qualification for Promotion Playoffs
6	Anadolu Üsküdar 1908	33	14	9	10	48	43	+5	51	
7	Siirtspor	33	14	9	10	36	31	+5	51	
8	Yimpaş Yozgatspor	34	12	12	10	40	38	+2	48	
9	Erzurum B.B.	33	13	8	12	43	39	+4	47	
10	Aydınspor 1923	33	12	11	10	33	34	−1	47	
11	Pazarspor	33	12	11	10	36	39	−3	47	
12	Çanakkale Dardanelspor	33	11	12	10	30	27	+3	45	
13	Tekirova Belediyespor	34	9	15	10	28	32	−4	42	
14	Beylerbeyi	33	10	10	13	38	37	+1	40	
15	Ankara Demirspor	33	10	9	14	38	43	−5	39	
16	Kayapınar Belediyespor	33	8	11	14	31	39	−8	35	Relegation to Regional Amateur League
17	Araklıspor	33	8	8	17	32	55	−23	32	Relegation to Regional Amateur League
18	Afyonkarahisarspor	33	7	9	17	30	46	−16	30	Relegation to Regional Amateur League
19	Çarşambaspor	33	4	7	22	25	62	−37	19	Relegation to Regional Amateur League

Updated to match(es) played on 22 April 2012. Source: TFF Third League page
Rules for classification: 1) points; 2) goal difference; 3) number of goals scored.

=== Group 3 positions by round ===
Team ╲ Round	1	2	3	4	5	6	7	8	9	10	11	12	13	14	15	16	17	18	19	20	21	22	23	24	25	26	27	28	29	30	31	32	33	34
Afyonkarahisarspor	16	18	18	10	10	10	10	15	15	13	13	15	15	15	15	15	15	16	17	17	17	17	17	18	18	18	18	18	18	18	18	18	18	
Anadolu Üsküdar 1908	1	2	8	16	16	16	16	13	14	11	11	8	8	8	8	8	8	5	7	5	5	5	5	5	6	6	6	6	6	6	6	6	6	
Ankara Demirspor	13	8	13	11	11	11	11	16	16	15	15	13	13	13	13	13	13	9	11	15	15	15	15	15	15	15	15	15	15	15	15	15	15	
Araklıspor	9	16	12	9	9	9	9	10	12	9	9	4	4	4	4	4	4	7	4	10	10	10	10	16	17	17	17	17	17	17	17	17	17	
Aydınspor 1923	15	9	5	5	5	5	5	4	6	4	4	7	7	7	7	7	7	6	9	9	9	9	9	8	10	10	10	10	10	10	10	10	10	
Beylerbeyi	8	17	17	12	12	12	12	8	10	10	10	17	17	17	17	17	17	17	16	8	8	8	8	9	14	14	14	14	14	14	14	14	14	
Bursa Nilüferspor	14	7	4	7	7	7	7	6	8	8	8	5	5	5	5	5	5	4	5	7	7	7	7	7	5	5	5	5	5	5	5	3	3	
Çanakkale Dardanelspor	11	13	16	14	14	14	14	11	13	16	16	10	10	10	10	10	10	10	10	16	16	16	16	14	12	12	12	12	12	12	12	12	12	
Çarşambaspor	10	12	14	19	19	19	19	19	19	19	19	19	19	19	19	19	19	19	19	19	19	19	19	19	19	19	19	19	19	19	19	19	19	
Darıca Gençlerbirliği	2	3	1	6	6	6	6	9	7	7	7	9	9	9	9	9	9	12	8	14	14	14	14	13	7	7	7	7	7	7	7	5	5	
Erzurum B.B.	19	19	19	18	18	18	18	18	17	17	17	16	16	16	16	16	16	13	13	12	12	12	12	11	9	9	9	9	9	9	9	9	9	
Hatayspor	3	5	2	1	1	1	1	1	1	1	1	1	1	1	1	1	1	1	1	1	1	1	1	1	1	1	1	1	1	1	1	1	1	
Kayapınar Belediyespor	17	15	7	17	17	17	17	17	18	18	18	18	18	18	18	18	18	18	18	18	18	18	18	17	16	16	16	16	16	16	16	16	16	
Pazarspor	5	6	11	13	13	13	13	12	9	14	14	14	14	14	14	14	14	15	15	13	13	13	13	10	11	11	11	11	11	11	11	11	11	
Sancaktepe Belediyespor	4	4	9	2	2	2	2	2	2	3	3	3	3	3	3	3	3	3	2	3	3	3	3	2	3	3	3	3	3	3	3	4	4	
Siirtspor	18	14	10	3	3	3	3	5	4	5	5	6	6	6	6	6	6	8	6	4	4	4	4	4	4	4	4	4	4	4	4	7	7	
Tarsus İ.Y.	7	10	6	4	4	4	4	3	3	2	2	2	2	2	2	2	2	2	3	2	2	2	2	3	2	2	2	2	2	2	2	2	2	
Tekirova Belediyespor	12	11	15	15	15	15	15	14	11	12	12	12	12	12	12	12	12	14	14	11	11	11	11	12	13	13	13	13	13	13	13	13	13	
Yimpaş Yozgatspor	6	1	3	8	8	8	8	7	5	6	6	11	11	11	11	11	11	11	12	6	6	6	6	6	8	8	8	8	8	8	8	8	8	

Source: TFF Third League page

=== Group 3 results ===
Home \ Away	AFY	AND	ADS	ARK	AYD	BEY	BNL	DAR	ÇRŞ	DGB	EBB	HTY	KYP	PAZ	SNC	SRT	TİY	TBS	YMP
Afyonkarahisarspor		2–2	0–0		1–3	1–0	0–0	0–0	1–0	1–2	2–1	0–2	2–2	1–1	3–0	0–1	1–2	1–2	
Anadolu Üsküdar 1908			2–1	4–2	5–0	0–3	1–3	1–0	0–0	2–4	0–0	1–0	3–2	1–2	1–1	1–0	2–3	3–0	1–0
Ankara Demirspor	1–2	1–3		2–0	1–1		0–0	0–0	3–1	1–2	2–3	2–0	2–1	0–0	1–2	1–1	1–2	1–0	
Araklıspor	2–0	2–0	1–3		0–1	2–2	1–1	1–1	1–0	0–2	1–2	0–0	0–1	3–5	1–1		1–3	1–1	1–0
Aydınspor 1923	1–0	1–0	1–2	3–1		2–0	0–1	0–1	1–0	1–1	0–1	1–1		0–0	1–2	0–2		3–2	0–0
Beylerbeyi	4–1		0–1	0–1	2–2		2–0		3–0	0–1	1–0	0–1	1–3	2–2	3–2	1–0	1–1		3–1
Bursa Nilüferspor	3–0		2–0	2–1		3–0		1–0	0–2	3–2	3–1	1–2	0–0	1–0	3–1	2–2	1–2	0–0	1–1
Çanakkale Dardanelspor	1–0		1–2	2–0	0–1	0–0	1–1		3–0	1–1	4–3		2–0	1–0		0–0	0–1	0–0	2–2
Çarşambaspor	0–3	3–0	1–1	0–0	0–2	3–2		0–2		1–1	1–3	0–2	2–2	1–2		0–1	4–2	1–2	0–0
Darıca Gençlerbirliği	3–2		1–0	1–2	2–2	1–1	0–0	0–2	2–2		2–3	1–0	4–0	1–1		1–1	0–1	3–1	0–1
Erzurum B.B.	1–0	0–2	2–2		0–0	1–0	2–2	3–0	4–1	0–1		2–0		4–0	0–0	1–1	1–0	1–1	1–2
Hatayspor	3–0	4–0		5–2	1–0	2–2	2–1	2–0	2–0	2–0	1–2		0–0	4–1	2–1	1–0		0–3	3–0
Kayapınar Belediyespor	2–0	1–1	1–0	0–1	1–1	1–2	2–0	0–1		1–2	1–0	0–0		0–0	2–0	0–0	2–1	0–1	1–1
Pazarspor	1–2	2–1	2–2	0–1	2–3	1–0			2–0	3–2	0–0	2–1	1–0		1–2	1–0	1–1	1–0	0–0
Sancaktepe Belediyespor	1–1	1–4	5–0	3–0	1–0	1–1	1–1	0–0	5–1	1–0		0–1	1–0	1–1		2–0	0–0	0–0	3–1
Siirtspor	2–1		1–3	2–2	0–0	1–0	0–3	2–1	3–1	1–0	5–0	1–0	3–2	2–0			1–4	2–0	0–1
Tarsus İ.Y.	0–0	0–1	1–0	3–1	3–0	0–1	2–3	1–2	4–0	1–3	1–0	0–1	3–2		3–1	2–0		1–1	2–0
Tekirova Belediyespor	2–1	0–0		1–0	0–1	1–1	1–3	0–0	1–0	0–0	1–0	1–1	1–1	0–1	1–2	0–0	1–0		1–1
Yimpaş Yozgatspor	1–1	1–1	3–2	4–0	1–1	1–0	0–0	2–1	2–0		2–1	2–3	3–0	2–0	1–4	0–1	1–2	2–2	

Updated to match(es) played on 22 April 2012. Source: TFF Third League page
Legend: Blue = home team win; Yellow = draw; Red = away team win.

=== Group 3 top goalscorers ===
Including matches played on 9 August 2011;
Source: TFF Third League page

Rank	Scorer	Club	Goals
1	(Turkey)		
2	(Turkey)		
3	(Turkey)		
4	(Turkey)		
5	(Turkey)		
6	(Turkey)		
7	(Turkey)		
8	(Turkey)		
9	(Turkey)		
10	(Turkey)		

== Promotion playoffs ==
In each group, teams ranked second through fifth compete in the promotion playoffs for the 2012–13 TFF Second League. The 2nd team and 5th team, and 3rd and 4th teams play one match in a neutral venue. Winners play finals. Winner of the final becomes the second team in each group to promote to TFF Second League 2012–2013.

== See also ==
- 2011–12 Turkish Cup
- 2011–12 Süper Lig
- 2011–12 TFF First League
- 2011–12 TFF Second League
