= 2010–11 TFF Third League =

TFF Third League
- Season: 2010–11
- Champions: Tepecik, Kırklareli, Gaziosmanpaşa,
- Promoted: Ünye, Altınordu, Denizli Bel.
- Relegated: Kırşehir, 72Batman, Malatya, Beykoz, Isparta, Erzurumspor, Yalova, Torbalı, Zeytinburnu
- Matches: 918
- Goals: 2,170 (2.36 per match)
- Top goalscorer: Mustafa Ünver (MKE): 22
- Biggest home win: OYK-Beykoz: 9-0 (17)
- Biggest away win: Isparta-Y.İsk.: 0-7 (12)
- Highest scoring: OYK-Beykoz: 9-0 (17)

The 2010–11 TFF Third League (also known as Spor-Toto Third League due to sponsorship reasons) is the 10th season of the league since its establishment in 2001 as the fourth level division; and the 40th season of the third league in Turkish football since its establishment in 1967–68 (before 2001 league was played as third level division).

League was started with 54 teams in three groups: Groups 1, 2 and 3, each consisting of 18 teams. Winner of each group promoted to 2011–12 TFF Second League. A playoff series were played among the best four teams in each group to determine the three more teams to promote. Bottom three teams in each groups were relegated to 2011–12 Regional Amateur League.

The start date of the league was 5 September 2010. Normal season was completed on 15 May 2011. Play-off round was played between 23–27 May 2011.

== Teams ==
Locations of teams in the 2010–11 TFF Third League.
Key: Red – Group 1, Blue – Group 2, Green – Group 3

Team	Group	Location	Stadium	Capacity	President	Coach
Afyonkarahisarspor	2	Afyonkarahisar	Afyon Atatürk Stadium	10,000	Hikmet Bülbül	Orhan Yahya Yüce
Altınordu	2	İzmir	Buca İlçe Stadium	6,341	Mustafa Bilen	Metin Çelikdelen
Anadolu Üsküdar 1908	2	Istanbul	Vefa Stadium	6,500	Murat Şahin	Mehmet Hakkı Hocaoğlu
Ankara Demirspor	1	Ankara	Cebeci İnönü Stadium	37,000	Nuğman Yavuz	Ufuk Sarı
Araklıspor	3	Trabzon	Araklı İlçe Stadium	1,364	Reşat Çebi	Halit Yakupoğlu
Arsinspor	1	Trabzon	Arsin İlçe Stadium	1,300	Mustafa Keleş	Orhan Cinemre
Batman Petrolspor	2	Batman	Batman 16 Mayıs Stadium	4,900	Besim Şişman	Erdem Acar
Bayrampaşaspor	1	Istanbul	Çetin Emeç Stadium	3,200	Şafak Aydın Silin	Taşkın Güngör
Belediye Bingölspor	1	Bingöl	Bingöl Şehir Stadium	3,000	Şerafettin Varolgüneş	Nihat Balan
Beykozspor 1908	2	Istanbul	Beykoz Stadium	3,500	Zeki Aksu	Maksut Ünlü
Beylerbeyi	3	Istanbul	Beylerbeyi 75. Yıl Stadium	5,500	Mustafa Yazıcı	Şeref Özşan
Bursa Nilüferspor	1	Bursa	Nilüfer Stadium	0	Nevzat Tuna	Ergun Kutsal
Darıca Gençlerbirliği	2	Kocaeli	Darıca İlçe Stadium	6,500	Halil Akbaşoğlu	Halit Üçkaleler
Denizli Belediyespor	3	Denizli	Doğan Seyfi Atlı Stadium	15,427	Tanju Beştaş	Yaşar Güngör
Diyarbakır BB	3	Diyarbakır	Seyrantepe Diski Spor Tesisleri	1,540	Haci Haspolat	Aydın Gözüaçık
Dört Eylül Belediyespor	2	Sivas	Sivas 4 Eylül Stadium	14,998	Ahmet Polat	Ömer Ateş
Erzurumspor	2	Erzurum	Cemal Gürsel Stadium	17,000	Coşkun Aslan	
Gaziosmanpaşa	3	Istanbul	Gaziosmanpaşa Stadium	2,850	Mehmet Öztürk	Hasan Saka
Gölcükspor	3	Kocaeli	Gölcük Şehir Stadium		İsmail Gençdemir	Tunahan Akdoğan
Gümüşhanespor	2	Gümüşhane	Gümüşhane Yenişehir Stadium	4,000	Kurban Karagöz	A.R. Sinan Bayraktar
Hatayspor	1	Hatay	Hatay Atatürk Stadium	6,015	Hikmet Çinçin	İsmail Batur
Ispartaspor	2	Isparta	Isparta Atatürk Stadium	10,000	Remzi Erdoğan	Tarık Söyleyici
İnegölspor	1	Bursa	İnegöl İlçe Stadium	4,975	Yusuf Şen	Cevdet Uzunköprü
İstanbulspor	1	Istanbul	Bahçelievler İl Özel İdare	4,350	Ömer Sarıalioğlu	Mehmet Erdal Alpaslan
Kahramanmaraşspor	2	Kahramanmaraş	Hanefi Mahçiçek Stadium	9,169	Doğan Tehci	Alaaddin Demirözü
Karsspor	3	Kars	Kars Şehir Stadium	5,000	Muzaffer Sanğu	Bülent Topuzoğlu
Kastamonuspor	3	Kastamonu	Kastamonu Gazi Stadium	4,033	Levent Özbek	Ayhan Alemdaroğlu
Kayapınar Belediyespor	1	Diyarbakır	Seyrantepe 1 nolu saha	500	Mehmet Askeri Kelekçiler	Seyithan Özdaş
Keçiörengücü	3	Ankara	Ankara Aktepe Stadium	4,883	Sedat Tahiroğlu	Murat Özgen
Keçiören Sportif	2	Ankara	Yenimahalle Hasan Doğan Stadium		Halit Öngün	Murat Küçük
Kepez Belediyespor	3	Antalya	Hasan Doğan Stadium		Ahmet Ünlüoğlu	Mehmet Uğurlu
Kırıkhanspor	3	Hatay	İskenderun 5 Temmuz Stadium	12,390	Mete İçcan	Ahmet Taşyürek
Kırklarelispor	2	Kırklareli	Kırklareli Atatürk Stadium	2,000	Volkan Can	Bilgin Erdem
Kırşehirspor	1	Kırşehir	Kırşehir Ahi Stadium	7,500	Recep Şanal	Mehmet Ali Honca
Lüleburgazspor	1	Kırklareli	Lüleburgaz 8 Kasım Stadium	2,500	Siyami Aslan	Ahmet Kazım Ertem
Malatyaspor	1	Malatya	Malatya İnönü Stadium	10,411	Mustafa Korkmaz	Ergün Albayrak
Menemen Belediyespor	1	İzmir	Menemen Şehir Stadium	2,000	Armağan Öktenoğlu	Taner Taşkın
MKE Kırıkkalespor	3	Kırıkkale	Fikret Karabudak Stadium	5,402	Ali Koç Uzel	Harun Aydoslu
Nazilli Belediyespor	1	Aydın	Nazilli İlçe Stadium	4,500	Engin Topçu	Mustafa Ceviz
Orhangazispor	2	Bursa	Orhangazi İlçe Stadium	0	Recep Alemdar	Metin Begüm
Oyak Renaultspor	2	Bursa	Oyak Renault Stadium	3,000	Alpay Şar	Ahmet Neneoğlu
Pazarspor	3	Rize	Pazar İlçe Stadium	2,442	Mustafa Taşkın	Kenan Gönen
Sancaktepe Belediyespor	3	Istanbul	S.B. Hakan Şükür Stadium		Muhammed Ali Cankatar	Keskin Çetinkaya
Siirtspor	3	Siirt	Siirt Atatürk Stadium	5,650	Mehmet Fadıl Akgündüz	Ramazan Silin
Tekirova Belediyespor	1	Antalya	Dr. Fehmi Öncel Stadium		Fahri Şimşek	Osman Yalçın
Tepecikspor	1	Istanbul	Tepecik Belediye Stadium	3,000	Osman Eyüboğlu	Enver Şen
Torbalıspor	3	İzmir	Torbalı 7 Eylül Stadium	1,457	Sabit Şevki Güldoğan	Zeki Erguvan
Ünyespor	1	Ordu	Ünye İlçe Stadium	10,340	Ömer Zorlu	Bülent Demirkanlı
Trabzon Yalıspor	2	Trabzon	Yavuz Selim Stadium	1,820	Muhammed Kara	Atilla Tokmak
Yalovaspor	3	Yalova	Yalova Atatürk Stadium	8,980	Hasan Kızılkaya	Hakan Çobanoğlu
Yeni İskenderunspor	2	Hatay	İskenderun 5 Temmuz Stadium	12,390	Sedat Uysal	Can Güven
72 Batmanspor	1	Batman	Batman 16 Mayıs Stadium	4,900	Mehmet Reşit Kaygu	Faris Ergün
Yimpaş Yozgatspor	2	Yozgat	Yozgat Bozok Stadium	8,260	Dursun Uyar	Harun Dişlitaş
Zeytinburnuspor	3	Istanbul	Zeytinburnu Stadium	16,000	Kazim Uçar	Zekeriya Karalı

Note: By the end of season. Source: TFF coach search.

== Group 1 ==
=== Group 1 league table ===
Pos	Team	Pld	W	D	L	GF	GA	GD	Pts	Qualification or relegation
1	Tepecikspor A.Ş. (C, P)	34	18	7	9	56	38	+18	61	Promotion to 2. Lig
2	Bursa Nilüferspor	34	17	8	9	39	24	+15	59	Qualification for Promotion Playoffs
3	Lüleburgazspor	34	17	6	11	33	27	+6	57	Qualification for Promotion Playoffs
4	Nazilli Belediyespor	34	15	12	7	53	26	+27	57	Qualification for Promotion Playoffs
5	Ünyespor (P)	34	16	8	10	40	30	+10	56	Qualification for Promotion Playoffs
6	İnegölspor	34	15	11	8	43	28	+15	56	
7	Bayrampaşaspor	34	14	12	8	52	30	+22	54	
8	Hatayspor	34	15	8	11	46	27	+19	53	
9	Belediye Bingölspor	34	12	13	9	44	34	+10	49	
10	Menemen Belediye Spor	34	13	9	12	41	40	+1	48	
11	Arsinspor	34	12	10	12	35	37	−2	46	
12	İstanbulspor	34	11	11	12	30	30	0	44	
13	Tekirova Belediyespor	34	12	8	14	30	41	−11	44	
14	Ankara Demirspor	34	9	12	13	33	40	−7	39	
15	Kayapınar Belediyespor	34	10	9	15	24	34	−10	39	
16	Kırşehirspor (R)	34	8	8	18	38	49	−11	32	Relegation to Regional Amateur League
17	72 Batmanspor (R)	34	8	7	19	23	47	−24	31	Relegation to Regional Amateur League
18	Malatyaspor (R)	34	1	7	26	11	89	−78	7 (Note: Malatyaspor had a 3 points penalty due to non-appearance. After second the team has been relegated.)	Relegation to Regional Amateur League

Updated to match(es) played on 15 May 2011. Source: TFF Third League page
Rules for classification: 1) points; 2) goal difference; 3) number of goals scored.
(C) Champions; (P) Promoted; (R) Relegated

=== Group 1 positions by round ===
Team ╲ Round	1	2	3	4	5	6	7	8	9	10	11	12	13	14	15	16	17	18	19	20	21	22	23	24	25	26	27	28	29	30	31	32	33	34
Tepecikspor A.Ş.	18	17	12	11	8	9	6	8	10	8	5	3	3	2	3	4	5	5	8	5	8	7	5	4	4	5	5	3	3	3	3	1	1	1
Bursa Nilüferspor	12	14	10	4	6	6	3	3	2	4	2	4	5	6	5	3	2	2	3	4	3	5	6	5	5	3	3	1	1	1	1	2	2	2
Lüleburgazspor	4	3	3	6	4	5	7	7	6	7	10	8	11	8	8	6	8	10	10	11	10	10	9	7	8	10	10	8	8	8	8	7	6	3
Nazilli Belediyespor	14	6	4	9	5	4	9	5	4	5	6	5	6	4	4	5	4	4	5	3	5	4	4	6	9	6	6	6	6	6	6	3	5	4
Ünyespor	4	2	2	1	2	1	1	1	3	3	1	1	2	3	2	2	3	3	2	2	2	2	2	2	2	2	2	4	4	4	4	5	3	5
İnegölspor	2	4	6	2	1	2	2	4	5	2	4	6	4	5	6	8	9	8	4	7	9	9	7	8	6	7	7	7	7	7	7	8	8	6
Bayrampaşaspor	12	14	8	12	10	14	11	12	13	13	12	9	7	9	7	9	6	7	9	6	4	3	3	3	3	4	4	5	5	5	5	6	4	7
Hatayspor	3	7	11	15	12	7	4	2	1	1	3	2	1	1	1	1	1	1	1	1	1	1	1	1	1	1	1	2	2	2	2	4	7	8
Belediye Bingölspor	6	16	18	18	18	17	16	16	14	16	16	16	14	15	13	13	13	14	13	14	15	14	11	10	10	9	9	10	10	10	10	10	10	9
Menemen Belediye Spor	6	10	15	14	14	13	15	10	7	10	9	12	10	7	9	7	7	6	7	9	7	8	10	11	12	11	11	9	9	9	9	9	9	10
Arsinspor	14	8	9	6	9	10	12	13	11	9	8	11	9	11	12	12	11	9	6	8	6	6	8	9	7	8	8	11	11	11	11	12	12	11
İstanbulspor	6	10	5	8	11	12	14	15	16	14	15	15	16	16	16	16	15	15	15	15	13	13	14	14	14	14	14	12	12	12	12	11	11	12
Tekirova Belediyespor	16	9	13	10	13	8	8	11	8	6	7	7	8	10	11	10	10	11	12	13	14	15	15	15	15	15	15	13	13	13	13	13	13	13
Ankara Demirspor	1	1	1	5	3	3	5	6	9	11	13	10	12	12	10	11	12	12	11	10	11	12	13	12	13	13	13	15	15	15	15	15	14	14
Kayapınar Belediyespor	10	5	7	3	7	10	10	14	15	15	14	14	15	13	13	14	14	13	14	12	12	11	12	13	11	12	12	14	14	14	14	14	15	15
Kırşehirspor	6	13	14	13	15	15	13	9	12	12	11	13	13	14	14	15	16	16	16	16	16	17	17	17	17	17	17	16	16	16	16	16	16	16
72 Batmanspor	17	18	17	17	16	18	18	17	17	17	17	18	18	18	17	17	17	17	17	17	17	16	16	16	16	16	16	17	17	17	17	17	17	17
Malatyaspor	10	12	15	15	17	16	17	18	18	18	18	17	17	17	18	18	18	18	18	18	18	18	18	18	18	18	18	18	18	18	18	18	18	18

Source: TFF Third League page

=== Group 1 results ===
Home \ Away	ADS	ARS	BYR	BNG	BNL	HTY	ING	IST	KYP	KIR	LBS	MAL	MBS	NBS	TBS	TPC	ÜNY	BAT
Ankara Demirspor		0–0	0–0	1–1	1–5	0–0	1–2	1–0	1–2	5–2	2–0	0–0	0–1	1–2	0–1	1–1	0–1	2–0
Arsinspor	1–0		1–3	1–1	1–0	0–3	2–2	1–1	1–1	2–1	3–0	1–0	1–1	0–0	2–0	1–3	2–1	1–0
Bayrampaşaspor	2–2	2–1		2–2	0–0	3–3	0–2	3–0	0–1	2–0	5–1	6–0	1–0	1–1	1–0	3–0	2–0	1–0
Belediye Bingölspor	1–2	0–1	0–0		1–1	1–0	0–0	0–0	1–0	4–0	1–0	1–1	0–1	1–3	4–0	2–3	1–1	1–1
Bursa Nilüferspor	1–0	0–2	0–0	0–1		1–0	2–0	2–0	1–0	2–0	1–1	3–0	1–0	1–0	1–0	3–2	1–1	1–1
Hatayspor	2–0	1–1	2–1	0–0	1–0		2–1	2–0	0–1	3–1	0–1	2–0	1–2	1–1	3–0	4–0	1–1	4–0
İnegölspor	0–0	2–0	1–4	3–0	0–0	1–0		1–0	2–0	1–1	1–0	6–0	2–3	2–1	3–1	1–1	2–1	1–1
İstanbulspor	0–0	2–1	0–0	2–2	1–0	1–0	1–0		3–1	2–0	1–0	0–2	0–0	0–0	2–0	1–2	1–1	1–2
Kayapınar Belediyespor	1–2	1–1	1–1	0–1	0–0	1–0	1–0	1–0		1–3	0–0	1–1	1–0	1–2	0–1	0–2	0–1	0–0
Kırşehirspor	2–1	1–0	0–1	2–5	0–2	0–2	0–0	1–1	0–0		1–0	3–0	2–2	1–1	2–0	1–1	0–1	1–2
Lüleburgazspor	1–1	1–0	1–0	1–0	1–0	4–0	2–0	2–0	1–0	0–0		1–0	2–1	1–0	2–2	0–1	1–0	2–1
Malatyaspor	2–2	1–4	2–3	0–4	0–1	0–2	0–0	0–6	1–3	0–6	0–3		0–2	1–1	0–0	0–7	0–2	0–2
Menemen Belediye Spor	2–0	1–0	1–1	0–1	1–3	1–4	1–2	1–1	3–0	3–2	1–0	2–0		1–3	2–2	1–1	2–1	0–1
Nazilli Belediyespor	6–0	4–0	1–0	2–4	4–2	0–0	0–0	0–0	3–1	1–0	1–1	4–0	1–0		0–0	6–2	0–1	4–1
Tekirova Belediyespor	0–0	2–1	2–1	3–2	0–1	1–0	1–4	1–2	0–0	2–1	0–2	1–0	1–1	1–0		0–0	1–0	5–0
Tepecikspor A.Ş.	3–1	0–0	3–2	3–0	2–0	2–0	0–0	1–0	0–1	1–0	3–0	4–0	1–2	1–0	2–0		1–3	2–1
Ünyespor	0–2	1–0	1–1	0–1	3–2	1–1	2–0	0–1	2–1	1–0	1–0	3–0	4–2	0–0	2–1	2–1		0–1
72 Batmanspor	1–2	1–2	1–0	0–0	0–1	0–2	0–1	2–0	0–2	0–4	0–1	3–0	0–0	0–1	0–1	0–3	1–1	

Updated to match(es) played on 15 May 2011. Source: TFF Third League page
Legend: Blue = home team win; Yellow = draw; Red = away team win.

=== Group 1 top goalscorers ===
Including matches played on 15 May 2011;
Source: TFF Third League page

Rank	Scorer	Club	Goals
1	(Turkey) Alican Tez	İnegölspor	17
1	(Turkey) Aykut Sevim	Tepecikspor	17
3	(Turkey) Cihan Özer	Belediye Bingölspor	15
3	(Turkey) Yahya Alpaslan	Bayrampaşaspor	15
5	(Turkey) Eser Şen	Tepecikspor	13
6	(Turkey) Özkan Toprak	Hatayspor	12
7	(Turkey) Fatih Özer	Nazilli Belediyespor	11
8	(Turkey) Mehmet Alaeddinoğlu	Tepecikspor	9
8	(Turkey) Yasin Hatipoğlu	Bayrampaşaspor	9
8	(Turkey) A. Burak Kömürcü	Ankara Demirspor	9

== Group 2 ==
=== Group 2 league table ===
Pos	Team	Pld	W	D	L	GF	GA	GD	Pts	Qualification or relegation
1	Kırklarelispor (C, P)	34	22	7	5	62	27	+35	73	Promotion to 2. Lig
2	Afyonkarahisarspor	34	21	6	7	56	23	+33	69	Qualification for Promotion Playoffs
3	Gümüşhanespor	34	20	7	7	47	19	+28	67	Qualification for Promotion Playoffs
4	Darıca Gençlerbirliği	34	17	10	7	45	27	+18	61	Qualification for Promotion Playoffs
5	Altınordu A.Ş. (P)	34	18	7	9	57	33	+24	61	Qualification for Promotion Playoffs
6	Dört Eylül Belediyespor	34	17	9	8	61	37	+24	60	
7	Orhangazispor	34	16	12	6	48	24	+24	60	
8	Oyak Renaultspor	34	16	10	8	52	26	+26	58	
9	Anadolu Üsküdar 1908	34	16	8	10	51	35	+16	56	
10	Yeni İskenderunspor	34	12	12	10	39	31	+8	48	
11	Batman Petrolspor	34	10	13	11	39	38	+1	43	
12	Trabzon Yalıspor	34	12	5	17	38	41	−3	41	
13	Kahramanmaraşspor A.Ş.	34	10	10	14	38	43	−5	40	
14	Keçiören Sportif	34	9	6	19	47	57	−10	33	
15	Yimpaş Yozgatspor	34	8	8	18	30	49	−19	32	
16	Beykozspor 1908 (R)	34	8	4	22	39	83	−44	28	Relegation to Regional Amateur League
17	Ispartaspor (R)	34	5	4	25	26	81	−55	19	Relegation to Regional Amateur League
18	Erzurumspor (R)	34	0	0	34	0	102	−102	−3 (Note: Erzurumspor was relegated due to 2 match non-appearance and games were awarded 3-0 to opponents. After first round team had a 3 points penalty.)	Relegation to Regional Amateur League

Updated to match(es) played on 15 May 2011. Source: TFF Third League page
Rules for classification: 1) points; 2) goal difference; 3) number of goals scored.
(C) Champions; (P) Promoted; (R) Relegated

=== Group 2 positions by round ===
Team ╲ Round	1	2	3	4	5	6	7	8	9	10	11	12	13	14	15	16	17	18	19	20	21	22	23	24	25	26	27	28	29	30	31	32	33	34
Kırklarelispor	6	3	2	3	3	2	3	2	3	3	5	3	3	4	3	2	5	3	2	2	2	2	2	2	2	1	1	1	1	1	1	1	1	1
Afyonkarahisarspor	1	1	1	2	2	1	1	3	4	2	4	1	1	1	1	1	1	1	1	1	1	1	1	1	1	2	2	2	2	2	2	2	2	2
Gümüşhanespor	3	4	3	1	1	4	2	1	1	1	1	2	2	2	2	3	6	6	4	4	3	4	3	3	3	3	3	3	3	3	3	3	3	3
Darıca Gençlerbirliği	6	5	4	4	4	8	6	5	2	4	2	4	4	5	6	7	4	7	7	7	9	8	9	7	6	7	7	6	6	6	6	6	7	4
Altınordu A.Ş.	15	8	8	5	5	3	7	6	5	5	3	5	5	3	4	4	2	5	6	6	5	6	5	6	7	5	5	5	5	5	5	5	6	5
Dört Eylül Belediyespor	11	11	10	13	12	10	8	7	7	7	9	10	9	10	8	8	7	4	3	3	4	3	4	5	5	8	8	9	9	9	9	8	8	6
Orhangazispor	3	11	9	6	6	4	4	4	6	6	6	8	8	6	7	6	8	8	8	8	7	5	6	4	4	4	4	4	4	4	4	4	4	7
Oyak Renaultspor	15	9	6	7	8	6	9	11	9	8	10	7	10	9	10	10	10	9	9	9	8	9	8	8	8	6	6	7	7	7	7	7	5	8
Anadolu Üsküdar 1908	11	13	13	10	7	9	11	9	8	11	8	6	6	7	5	5	3	2	5	5	6	7	7	9	9	9	9	8	8	8	8	9	9	9
Yeni İskenderunspor	6	1	5	9	13	13	12	10	12	10	11	9	7	8	9	9	9	10	10	10	10	10	10	10	10	10	10	10	10	10	10	10	10	10
Batman Petrolspor	5	6	11	11	10	7	5	8	10	9	7	11	11	11	11	11	11	11	12	12	12	12	12	12	11	11	11	11	11	11	11	11	11	11
Trabzon Yalıspor	11	14	14	14	14	14	14	14	13	13	14	14	14	14	13	14	12	12	11	11	11	11	11	11	11	12	12	12	12	12	12	12	12	12
Kahramanmaraşspor A.Ş.	1	9	6	8	8	11	13	13	14	14	13	13	12	12	12	13	14	13	14	14	13	13	13	13	14	14	14	13	13	13	13	13	13	13
Keçiören Sportif	10	15	15	15	16	17	17	15	16	15	15	15	15	16	15	15	15	15	15	15	15	15	14	14	13	13	13	14	14	14	14	14	14	14
Yimpaş Yozgatspor	6	7	12	12	11	12	10	12	11	12	12	12	13	13	14	12	13	14	13	13	14	14	15	15	15	15	15	15	15	15	15	15	15	15
Beykozspor 1908	17	17	17	17	17	16	16	17	15	16	16	16	16	15	16	16	16	16	16	16	16	17	17	16	16	16	16	16	16	16	16	16	16	16
Ispartaspor	11	16	16	16	15	15	15	16	17	17	17	17	17	17	17	17	17	17	17	17	17	16	16	17	17	17	17	17	17	17	17	17	17	17
Erzurumspor	18	18	18	18	18	18	18	18	18	18	18	18	18	18	18	18	18	18	18	18	18	18	18	18	18	18	18	18	18	18	18	18	18	18

Source: TFF Third League page

=== Group 2 results ===
Home \ Away	AFY	ATN	AND	BPT	BKZ	DGB	DEB	EZM	GMH	ISP	KMS	KSP	KRL	OGZ	OYK	YLS	YIS	YMP
Afyonkarahisarspor		1–2	0–1	5–1	2–1	3–0	1–1	3–0	2–1	4–0	5–1	2–0	2–0	1–0	1–0	2–0	0–1	1–0
Altınordu A.Ş.	3–1		1–0	2–1	5–0	1–2	0–0	3–0	1–1	4–1	2–0	1–1	2–1	1–3	2–2	2–1	3–0	2–0
Anadolu Üsküdar 1908	1–1	0–3		2–3	1–0	1–0	2–2	3–0	1–2	4–1	3–1	2–0	1–1	0–0	1–4	4–0	1–0	1–0
Batman Petrolspor	0–1	3–0	1–0		3–0	0–0	1–2	3–0	1–1	1–1	0–0	2–2	1–0	0–0	0–0	1–1	0–0	1–1
Beykozspor 1908	0–3	2–3	2–4	1–1		1–4	3–1	3–0	0–3	1–2	0–1	2–1	2–2	0–2	3–2	2–1	1–1	3–1
Darıca Gençlerbirliği	0–3	2–0	1–1	3–2	4–0		1–0	3–0	2–1	2–0	0–0	4–1	0–2	2–1	0–0	2–0	1–0	1–1
Dört Eylül Belediyespor	1–1	2–0	2–4	1–1	5–0	2–0		3–0	0–0	2–0	2–0	4–3	2–2	1–0	0–1	4–1	2–1	3–0
Erzurumspor	0–3	0–3	0–3	0–3	0–3	0–3	0–3		0–3	0–3	0–3	0–3	0–3	0–3	0–3	0–3	0–3	0–3
Gümüşhanespor	0–1	2–0	2–0	1–1	1–0	1–0	1–0	3–0		2–0	3–0	2–1	2–0	0–1	3–1	1–0	3–0	2–0
Ispartaspor	0–1	0–2	1–4	0–3	2–1	3–3	2–5	3–0	0–1		1–1	2–4	0–1	0–0	0–1	1–0	0–7	1–2
Kahramanmaraşspor A.Ş.	1–2	2–2	2–1	2–0	0–1	1–1	0–1	3–0	0–0	2–0		0–0	1–1	2–2	0–1	1–0	0–1	2–1
Keçiören Sportif	2–0	0–3	2–2	2–3	4–1	0–1	1–2	3–0	0–1	4–0	3–1		0–2	2–2	0–1	0–2	0–1	3–1
Kırklarelispor	0–2	1–0	1–0	2–0	4–2	0–0	3–1	3–0	1–0	5–1	2–1	5–3		1–1	2–2	2–1	2–0	2–0
Orhangazispor	1–1	1–1	0–1	2–1	3–0	1–0	2–1	3–0	3–2	2–0	1–1	2–0	0–1		2–0	2–0	1–1	3–0
Oyak Renaultspor	3–1	2–0	0–1	3–0	9–0	0–1	2–2	3–0	2–0	3–0	3–1	0–0	0–3	1–1		1–0	0–0	1–1
Trabzon Yalıspor	0–0	1–0	0–0	1–0	2–2	0–1	3–2	3–0	0–1	7–1	2–1	2–0	0–4	1–0	0–0		4–0	2–1
Yeni İskenderunspor	1–1	0–0	1–0	0–1	3–1	1–1	0–0	3–0	0–0	1–0	2–3	4–0	0–2	1–1	1–0	2–0		2–2
Yimpaş Yozgatspor	1–0	0–3	1–1	2–0	3–1	0–0	1–2	3–0	1–1	1–0	0–4	0–2	0–1	0–2	0–1	1–0	1–1	

Updated to match(es) played on 15 May 2011. Source: TFF Third League page
Legend: Blue = home team win; Yellow = draw; Red = away team win.

Note: Erzurumspor did not show up in two games and relegated to regional amateur league. Games awarded to opponents 3-0.

=== Group 2 top goalscorers ===
Including matches played on 15 May 2011;
Source: TFF Third League page

Rank	Scorer	Club	Goals
1	(Turkey) Onur Berber	Trabzon Yalıspor	17
2	(Turkey) Levent Kale	4 Eylül Belediye	13
3	(Turkey) Tarık Tekdal	Beykozspor 1908	12
4	(Turkey) Deniz Sert	Batman Petrolspor	11
4	(Turkey) Mustafa Demirci	Oyak Renault	11
6	(Turkey) Alp Kaya	Dört Eylül Belediye	10
6	(Turkey) Ömer Çelik	Afyonkarahisarspor	10
6	(Turkey) Özcan Polat	4 Eylül Belediye	10
9	(Turkey) Burçağ Başel	Anadolu Üsküdar 1908	9
9	(Turkey) Cemil Karakum	Batman Petrolspor	9

== Group 3 ==
=== Group 3 league table ===
Pos	Team	Pld	W	D	L	GF	GA	GD	Pts	Qualification or relegation
1	Gaziosmanpaşa (C, P)	34	21	6	7	47	23	+24	69	Promotion to 2. Lig
2	Beylerbeyi	34	17	12	5	48	27	+21	63	Qualification for Promotion Playoffs
3	Sancaktepe Belediyespor	34	16	8	10	36	34	+2	56	Qualification for Promotion Playoffs
4	Amed	34	16	8	10	54	46	+8	56	Qualification for Promotion Playoffs
5	Denizli Belediyespor (P)	34	14	12	8	37	26	+11	54	Qualification for Promotion Playoffs
6	Gölcükspor	34	13	12	9	38	27	+11	51	
7	Keçiörengücü	34	13	11	10	52	41	+11	50	
8	Kastamonuspor	34	12	13	9	36	33	+3	49	
9	Karsspor	34	12	12	10	38	39	−1	48	
10	Kırıkhanspor	34	13	8	13	41	42	−1	47	
11	Pazarspor	34	11	12	11	48	43	+5	45	
12	MKE Kırıkkalespor	34	12	7	15	59	45	+14	43	
13	Araklıspor	34	10	13	11	36	42	−6	43	
14	Siirtspor	34	10	11	13	37	37	0	41	
15	Kepez Belediyespor	34	9	12	13	31	42	−11	39	
16	Yalovaspor (R)	34	9	8	17	34	41	−7	35	Relegation to Regional Amateur League
17	Torbalıspor (R)	34	9	8	17	33	45	−12	32 (Note: Torbalıspor had a 3 points penalty.)	Relegation to Regional Amateur League
18	Zeytinburnuspor (R)	34	2	1	31	18	90	−72	7	Relegation to Regional Amateur League

Updated to match(es) played on 15 May 2011. Source: TFF Third League page
Rules for classification: 1) points; 2) goal difference; 3) number of goals scored.
(C) Champions; (P) Promoted; (R) Relegated

=== Group 3 positions by round ===
Team ╲ Round	1	2	3	4	5	6	7	8	9	10	11	12	13	14	15	16	17	18	19	20	21	22	23	24	25	26	27	28	29	30	31	32	33	34
Gaziosmanpaşa	1	5	3	2	1	1	1	1	1	1	1	1	1	1	1	1	1	1	1	1	1	1	1	1	1	1	1	1	1	1	1	1	1	1
Beylerbeyi	2	2	2	3	3	2	3	2	3	6	3	3	4	3	2	2	2	2	2	2	2	2	2	2	2	2	2	2	2	2	2	2	2	2
Sancaktepe Belediyespor	5	7	6	9	6	4	2	5	6	2	4	2	2	2	4	3	8	4	9	6	10	6	4	3	3	5	5	7	7	7	7	6	4	3
Amed	2	1	1	1	2	3	4	8	5	9	9	9	11	10	8	11	10	10	7	3	3	3	3	5	5	3	3	4	4	4	4	3	3	4
Denizli Belediyespor	13	18	11	7	8	10	11	9	9	8	5	6	7	7	9	6	3	5	4	7	5	7	5	4	4	9	9	5	5	5	5	5	6	5
Gölcükspor	2	2	5	4	4	5	5	4	4	7	7	5	5	4	5	8	6	7	10	10	6	4	6	6	9	6	6	3	3	3	3	4	5	6
Keçiörengücü	7	4	10	12	9	11	8	7	8	5	8	8	8	8	11	10	11	11	11	11	12	11	9	7	8	4	4	11	11	11	11	8	8	7
Kastamonuspor	18	16	9	5	7	6	6	3	7	4	6	7	6	6	3	5	9	9	6	9	9	10	7	8	6	7	7	8	8	8	8	10	10	8
Karsspor	11	9	13	10	12	13	13	11	10	11	12	11	9	9	7	9	7	3	5	8	8	9	10	9	7	8	8	6	6	6	6	7	7	9
Kırıkhanspor	13	6	12	14	11	8	9	10	12	13	10	10	10	11	13	12	12	12	12	12	11	12	11	12	12	10	10	9	9	9	9	9	9	10
Pazarspor	7	9	15	15	15	14	14	15	14	15	15	15	14	16	15	15	15	14	14	14	14	13	13	13	13	11	11	10	10	10	10	11	11	11
MKE Kırıkkalespor	7	9	14	11	13	9	10	12	11	12	13	14	15	14	16	16	16	16	16	16	17	17	14	14	14	14	14	12	12	12	12	12	12	12
Araklıspor	13	14	8	13	14	15	15	14	13	10	11	12	12	12	10	7	4	6	8	4	4	5	8	11	10	12	12	14	14	14	14	14	14	13
Siirtspor	11	12	7	8	5	7	7	6	2	3	2	4	3	5	6	4	5	8	3	5	7	8	12	10	11	13	13	13	13	13	13	13	13	14
Kepez Belediyespor	16	14	17	17	17	16	16	16	16	16	16	16	16	15	14	14	13	15	15	15	15	16	16	17	16	15	15	15	15	15	15	15	15	15
Yalovaspor	7	13	16	16	16	17	17	18	18	17	17	17	17	17	17	17	17	17	17	17	16	15	17	15	15	16	16	17	17	17	17	17	17	16
Torbalıspor	5	7	4	6	10	12	12	13	15	14	14	13	13	13	12	13	14	13	13	13	13	14	15	16	17	17	17	16	16	16	16	16	16	17
Zeytinburnuspor	16	17	18	18	18	18	18	17	17	18	18	18	18	18	18	18	18	18	18	18	18	18	18	18	18	18	18	18	18	18	18	18	18	18

Source: TFF Third League page

=== Group 3 results ===
Home \ Away	ARK	BEY	DBS	ASK	GOP	GLC	KAR	KAS	KEG	KPZ	KRH	MKE	PAZ	SNC	SRT	TOR	YLV	ZEY
Araklıspor		0–1	1–1	1–2	0–0	0–0	0–0	4–1	2–3	0–0	1–0	2–1	1–2	0–0	1–1	1–0	1–0	3–0
Beylerbeyi	2–2		1–0	2–0	1–1	0–0	1–2	2–0	2–1	3–1	1–1	5–2	3–1	1–0	1–1	1–3	1–0	5–0
Denizli Belediyespor	1–1	0–0		0–0	1–0	0–0	1–1	1–1	0–3	1–0	1–2	1–2	2–0	4–0	1–1	1–0	1–0	2–0
Amed	1–1	1–1	1–2		1–2	2–1	5–1	1–1	1–0	3–1	2–1	2–5	2–2	0–1	0–1	4–0	2–1	4–2
Gaziosmanpaşa	0–0	0–0	0–1	0–1		2–0	3–2	0–0	1–0	2–0	0–2	1–0	2–0	2–0	1–1	3–0	1–0	4–1
Gölcükspor	2–0	1–1	2–1	0–1	3–0		3–2	2–1	0–0	1–2	1–1	1–0	1–1	1–0	0–0	2–2	0–2	3–0
Karsspor	3–0	1–1	0–0	1–1	0–1	2–1		2–2	2–1	0–0	2–0	1–0	2–2	0–2	1–0	1–0	2–1	2–1
Kastamonuspor	0–1	0–0	1–1	1–2	1–3	1–1	1–0		1–1	0–0	0–0	2–1	3–0	1–0	1–1	2–1	3–1	1–0
Keçiörengücü	4–1	2–0	2–2	1–1	0–1	2–1	0–0	2–2		2–1	2–1	2–1	3–1	3–0	1–2	0–3	2–2	3–0
Kepez Belediyespor	0–1	0–0	0–2	2–1	2–4	1–0	2–1	0–3	2–2		2–0	1–1	1–1	2–3	0–0	2–2	2–1	1–0
Kırıkhanspor	2–1	1–2	0–3	4–1	0–2	0–0	1–1	2–0	2–2	0–2		0–4	4–0	1–2	2–0	3–1	0–1	4–2
MKE Kırıkkalespor	3–0	0–1	2–2	1–1	0–1	1–1	2–0	3–0	0–1	3–1	1–2		2–2	1–1	3–1	3–0	1–2	7–0
Pazarspor	4–0	1–0	1–0	5–1	1–2	0–1	3–1	1–0	4–1	0–0	1–1	2–2		2–0	1–1	0–1	1–1	2–1
Sancaktepe Belediyespor	1–1	0–1	0–1	3–2	4–1	1–0	1–1	1–1	1–1	1–0	0–1	3–2	2–1		1–0	1–0	1–0	2–1
Siirtspor	0–1	1–3	0–1	0–1	0–2	0–1	1–1	2–0	3–2	2–0	3–1	1–2	1–0	1–1		1–1	3–0	5–0
Torbalıspor	3–2	1–2	3–0	0–1	0–2	0–1	1–0	0–2	2–1	1–1	0–0	1–2	1–1	0–1	1–2		1–1	1–1
Yalovaspor	1–1	2–1	1–0	2–3	1–0	1–2	0–1	0–1	0–0	1–1	0–1	1–2	0–0	1–1	4–1	0–2		4–0
Zeytinburnuspor	3–5	1–2	0–2	0–3	0–3	0–5	1–2	0–1	0–2	0–1	0–2	2–1	1–4	0–1	1–0	0–1	1–2	

Updated to match(es) played on 15 May 2011. Source: TFF Third League page
Legend: Blue = home team win; Yellow = draw; Red = away team win.

Note: Torbalıspor did not show up in İstanbul against Gaziosmanpaşa for 9th round game.

=== Group 3 top goalscorers ===
Including matches played on 15 May 2011;
Source: TFF Third League page

Rank	Scorer	Club	Goals
1	(Turkey) Mustafa Ünver	MKE Kırıkkalespor	22
2	(Turkey) Gökhan Demir	Gaziosmanpaşaspor	20
3	(Turkey) Caner Erdoğan	Diyarbakır BB	16
4	(Turkey) Fatih Gümüşel	Gölcükspor	15
5	(Turkey) Ali Özgür Basa	Pazarspor	14
5	(Turkey) Gökhan Kılınç	Sancaktepe Bel.	14
7	(Turkey) Emre Kart	Kastamonuspor	12
7	(Turkey) Feyyaz Aydil	Pazarspor	12
7	(Turkey) Muhammed Savaşçı	Diyarbakır BB	12
7	(Turkey) Özgür Özkaya	Beylerbeyi	12

== Promotion playoffs ==
In each group, teams ranked second through fifth competed in the promotion playoffs for the 2011–12 TFF Second League. The 2nd team and 5th team, and 3rd and 4th teams played one match in a neutral venue. Winners played finals. Winner of the final became the second team in each group to promote to TFF Second League 2011-2012.

Group 1

Semifinals:

23 May 2011
17:00

Lüleburgazspor	1-0	Nazilli Belediyespor
	Report

19 Mayıs Stadium, Ankara
Referee: Volkan Bayarslan

23 May 2011
20:30

Bursa Nilüferspor	1-3	Ünyespor
	Report

19 Mayıs Stadium, Ankara
Referee: Tayfur Özkan

Finals:

26 May 2011
19:00

Lüleburgazspor	0-2	Ünyespor
	Report

19 Mayıs Stadium, Ankara
Referee: Özgüç Türkalp

Group 2

Semifinals:

24 May 2011
17:00

Gümüşhanespor	0-3	Darıca Gençlerbirliği
	Report

Atatürk Stadium, Eskişehir
Referee: Mürvet Sezer

24 May 2011
20:30

Afyonkarahisarspor	1-2	Altınordu
	Report

Atatürk Stadium, Eskişehir
Referee: Fethi Serkan Koçak

Finals:

27 May 2011
19:00

Darıca Gençlerbirliği	0-1	Altınordu
	Report

Atatürk Stadium, Eskişehir
Referee: Barış Şimşek

Group 3

Semifinals:

24 May 2011
17:00

Sancaktepe Belediyespor	1-1 (a.e.t.)	Diyarbakır Büyükşehir Belediyespor
	Report
Penalties
	7-8

19 Mayıs Stadium, Ankara
Referee: Çağatay Şahan

24 May 2011
20:30

Beylerbeyi	0-1	Denizli Belediyespor
	Report

19 Mayıs Stadium, Ankara
Referee: Zafer Demir

Finals:

27 May 2011
19:00

Diyarbakır Büyükşehir Belediyespor	0-0 (a.e.t.)	Denizli Belediyespor
	Report
Penalties
	2-4

19 Mayıs Stadium, Ankara
Referee: Mustafa İlker Coşkun

== See also ==
- 2010–11 Türkiye Kupası
- 2010–11 Süper Lig
- 2010–11 TFF First League
- 2010–11 TFF Second League
