= 2009–10 in Turkish football =

The 2009–10 season was the 105th season of competitive football in Turkey.

== Overview ==
Bursaspor became league champions for the first time in club history, as well as the second club outside of Istanbul to win the Süper Lig. Fenerbahçe were runners-up, while Galatasaray finished third. Diyarbakırspor, Denizlispor, and Ankaraspor were relegated. Ariza Makukula, on loan at Kayserispor from S.L. Benfica, finished top scorer with 21 goals. The season started with the Turkish Super Cup between Fenerbahçe (Turkish Cup runners-up) and Beşiktaş (Turkish Cup winners). Fenerbahçe won the match two to nil, with Alex scoring both goals. Fenerbahçe and Galatasaray started out in pole position in the league by winning each of their first six matches. Beşiktaş did not fare as well as the other two Istanbul giants, winning one match, drawing three times, and losing twice. Eventual champions Bursaspor held seventh place six weeks into the season. The club found themselves in third place at the winter break, with Fenerbahçe and Galatasaray in first and second respectively. Kayserispor also held first place for a brief period of two weeks before the winter break started.

Fenerbahçe hit a wall after the winter break, falling to fourth place by the 25th week. This allowed Bursaspor to rise to the top of the table, a position they held for seven consecutive weeks from 8 March to 19 April. Fenerbahçe took back first place by the 31st week of the season. Entering the last match-day, the club sat a point above second placed Bursaspor. In order to win the league, Fenerbahçe had to either win outright against Trabzonspor, or draw while Bursaspor either draws or loses to Beşiktaş. Bursaspor won 2–1, while Fenerbahçe drew 1–1, unable to recover from Burak Yılmaz's first half goal. Galatasaray finished third due to their positive head-to-head record against Beşiktaş. Bursaspor qualified for the group stage of the Champions League for the first time in club history. The club had previously competed in the 1974–75 and 1986–87 European Cup Winners' Cup, as well as the 1995 UEFA Intertoto Cup.

The 2009–10 Turkish Cup started on 2 September 2009, with group stage matches taking place during the winter break. Defending champions Beşiktaş were drawn into Group D alongside İstanbul B.B., Manisaspor, Kasımpaşa, and Konya Şekerspor. The club were unable to progress past the group stages after finishing fourth with three points. Meanwhile, Fenerbahçe, Bursaspor, Manisaspor, Denizlispor, Antalyaspor, Galatasaray, İstanbul B.B., and Trabzonspor progressed to the quarter-finals. Trabzonspor and Fenerbahçe met in the final at Şanlıurfa GAP Stadium on 5 May 2010. Trabzonspor won the final 3–1. The win marked Trabzonspor's eighth Turkish Cup trophy, tied for second most with Beşiktaş. It was also the ninth time Fenerbahçe lost in the final of the Turkish Cup. Arif Çoban of Tokatspor and Umut Bulut of Trabzonspor finished joint top scorers with seven goals each.

Ankaraspor were removed from the Süper Lig on 17 September 2009. The Turkish Football Federation released the following statement: "The Professional Football Disciplinary Committee (PFDK) decided to relegate Ankaraspor by one division over its relationship with Ankaragücü, ruling that it was contrary to sporting competitiveness." Ahmet Gökçek, son of Melih Gökçek, the mayor of Ankara and also honorary chairman of Ankaraspor, quit his post at Ankaraspor and was elected chairman of Ankaragücü soon after. He, along with Ankaraspor chairman Ruhi Kurnaz, were banned from the game for six months.

Karabükspor won the 1.Lig and Bucaspor finished second, earning successive promotions. In the 2.Lig, Güngören Belediyespor were crowned champions, with Akhisar Belediyespor and TKİ Tavşanlı Linyitspor also being promoted. Bandırmaspor won the 3.Lig, while Balıkesirspor finished second and Malatya Belediyespor won the promotion play-offs.

In continental competition, Beşiktaş and Sivasspor took part in the UEFA Champions League, while Fenerbahçe, Galatasaray, and Trabzonspor took part in the Europa League. Beşiktaş were drawn into Group B alongside Manchester United F.C., PFC CSKA Moscow, and VfL Wolfsburg. They finished last in the group with four points. Sivasspor were knocked out of the Champions League by R.S.C. Anderlecht in the second qualifying round, and were ousted out of the Europa League by reigning champions FC Shakhtar Donetsk in the first round.

Fenerbahçe made it to the group stages of the Europa League after defeating Budapest Honvéd FC and FC Sion. They were drawn into Group H alongside FC Twente, Sheriff Tiraspol, and Steaua București. The club finished first in the group, but lost to Lille OSC 2–3 on aggregate in the first knockout round. Galatasaray were drawn alongside Panathinaikos, Dinamo București, and Sturm Graz. They also finished first in their group, but were also eliminated in the first round, losing 2–3 on aggregate to eventual champions Atlético Madrid. Trabzonspor did not qualify for the group stages.

The Turkey national football team did not qualify for the 2010 FIFA World Cup after finishing third in their group. On 17 February 2010, it was announced that Guus Hiddink would replace Fatih Terim at the helm of the national team.

== Awards ==
- Gol Kralı (Goal King)
  - Ariza Makukula (Kayserispor) – 21 goals

== Honours ==
Competition	Winner	Runners-up
Süper Lig	Bursaspor (1)	Fenerbahçe (16)
1.Lig	Karabükspor (1)	Bucaspor (1)
2.Lig	Akhisar Belediyespor (1)	Güngören Belediyespor (1)
3.Lig	Bandırmaspor (3)	Balıkesirspor (1)
Turkish Cup	Trabzonspor (8)	Fenerbahçe (9)
Süper Kupa	Fenerbahçe (8)	Beşiktaş (9)

== Final leagues tables ==
=== Süper Lig ===
Pos	Team	Pld	W	D	L	GF	GA	GD	Pts	Qualification or relegation
1	Bursaspor (C)	34	23	6	5	65	26	+39	75	Qualification to Champions League group stage
2	Fenerbahçe	34	23	5	6	61	28	+33	74	Qualification to Champions League third qualifying round
3	Galatasaray	34	19	7	8	61	35	+26	64 (Note: Galatasaray finished ahead of Beşiktaş on head-to-head record: Galatasaray–Beşiktaş 3–0, Beşiktaş–Galatasaray 1–1.)	Qualification to Europa League third qualifying round
4	Beşiktaş	34	18	10	6	47	25	+22	64	Qualification to Europa League second qualifying round
5	Trabzonspor	34	16	9	9	53	32	+21	57	Qualification to Europa League play-off round (Note: Trabzonspor won the 2009–10 Turkish Cup and thus qualified for the play-off round of the UEFA Europa League.)
6	İstanbul B.B.	34	16	8	10	47	44	+3	56	
7	Eskişehirspor	34	15	10	9	44	34	+10	55	
8	Kayserispor	34	14	9	11	45	37	+8	51	
9	Antalyaspor	34	14	7	13	49	38	+11	49	
10	Gençlerbirliği	34	12	11	11	38	35	+3	47	
11	Kasımpaşa	34	10	11	13	50	53	−3	41 (Note: Kasımpaşa finished ahead of Ankaragücü on head-to-head record: Kasımpaşa–Ankaragücü 2–0, Ankaragücü–Kasımpaşa 2–2.)	
12	MKE Ankaragücü	34	9	14	11	39	40	−1	41	
13	Gaziantepspor	34	9	13	12	38	39	−1	40	
14	Manisaspor	34	8	13	13	27	34	−7	37	
15	Sivasspor	34	8	10	16	42	59	−17	34	
16	Diyarbakırspor (R)	34	6	9	19	28	54	−26	27	Relegation to TFF First League
17	Denizlispor (R)	34	6	8	20	30	49	−19	26	Relegation to TFF First League
18	Ankaraspor (R)	34	0	0	34	0	102	−102	0 (Note: On 7 October 2009, the Turkish Football Federation relegated Ankaraspor to the TFF First League with immediate effect due to the relationship of its governors with those of Ankaragücü being unsuitable for two teams competing in the same division. All of Ankaraspor's matches were scratched and counted as a 3–0 win for their opponents.)	Relegation to TFF First League

Source: Süper Lig official website
Rules for classification: 1st overall points, 2nd head-to-head points, 3rd head-to-head goal differential, 4th overall goal differential, 5th overall goals scored.
(C) Champions; (R) Relegated

=== 1.Lig ===
Pos	Team	Pld	W	D	L	GF	GA	GD	Pts	Qualification or relegation
1	Kardemir Karabükspor (C, P)	34	23	8	3	74	28	+46	77	Promotion to Süper Lig
2	Bucaspor (P)	34	19	7	8	69	40	+29	64 (Note: BUC 4–1 ADA; ADA 0–3 BUC)	Promotion to Süper Lig
3	Adanaspor	34	18	10	6	42	30	+12	64	Qualification for Promotion Playoffs
4	Altay	34	17	8	9	48	36	+12	59	Qualification for Promotion Playoffs
5	Karşıyaka	34	17	5	12	48	35	+13	56	Qualification for Promotion Playoffs
6	Konyaspor (O, P)	34	15	10	9	42	37	+5	55	Qualification for Promotion Playoffs
7	Giresunspor	34	15	6	13	51	42	+9	51	
8	Orduspor	34	11	11	12	33	32	+1	44	
9	Boluspor	34	12	7	15	48	53	−5	43	
10	Samsunspor	34	12	6	16	49	47	+2	42	
11	Erciyesspor	34	10	11	13	42	53	−11	41 (Note: KEC: 11 pts, 7–4; GBB: 10 pts, 6–4; MİY: 6 pts, 2–3; KRT: 5 pts, 2–6)	
12	Gaziantep B.B.	34	11	8	15	31	38	−7	41	
13	Mersin İdmanyurdu	34	11	8	15	36	44	−8	41	
14	Kartalspor	34	11	8	15	32	43	−11	41	
15	Çaykur Rizespor	34	10	10	14	37	53	−16	40	
16	Hacettepe Spor (R)	34	10	8	16	38	50	−12	38	Relegation to TFF Second League
17	Dardanelspor (R)	34	10	5	19	37	53	−16	35	Relegation to TFF Second League
18	Kocaelispor (R)	34	2	8	24	23	66	−43	14	Relegation to TFF Second League

Source: TFF
Rules for classification: 1) points; 2) goal difference; 3) number of goals scored.
(C) Champions; (O) Play-off winners; (P) Promoted; (R) Relegated

==== Playoffs ====
Pos	Team	Pld	W	D	L	GF	GA	GD	Pts	Promotion
1	Konyaspor (P)	3	2	1	0	6	3	+3	7	Promotion to Süper Lig
2	Altay	3	1	2	0	4	3	+1	5	
3	Karşıyaka	3	0	2	1	2	3	−1	2	
4	Adanaspor	3	0	1	2	4	7	−3	1	

Source: TFF group page
Rules for classification: 1) points; 2) goal difference; 3) number of goals scored.
(P) Promoted

=== 2.Lig ===
==== Promotion group ====
Pos	Team	Pld	W	D	L	GF	GA	GD	Pts	Qualification or relegation
1	Güngören Belediyespor (P)	16	9	4	3	22	13	+9	31	Promotion to TFF First League
2	Akhisar Belediyespor (P)	16	9	3	4	23	15	+8	30	Promotion to TFF First League
3	Tokatspor	16	7	3	6	18	16	+2	24	Qualification for Promotion play-offs
4	İskenderun Demir Çelikspor	16	6	5	5	20	16	+4	23	Qualification for Promotion play-offs
5	Türk Telekomspor	16	7	1	8	18	19	−1	22 (Note: TEL 4–1 ÇOR; ÇOR 1–1 TEL)	Qualification for Promotion play-offs
6	Çorumspor	16	6	4	6	22	25	−3	22	Qualification for Promotion play-offs
7	Etimesgut Şekerspor	16	5	3	8	15	24	−9	18	
8	Göztepe	16	4	4	8	13	16	−3	16	
9	Şanlıurfaspor	16	3	5	8	21	28	−7	14	

Source: Turkish Football Federation
Rules for classification: 1) points; 2) head-to-head points; 3) head-to-head goal difference; 4) head-to-head goals scored; 5) goal difference; 6) number of goals scored.
(P) Promoted

==== Play-offs ====
Quarter-finals
25 May – Mardan
Eyüpspor; Group 2 winners	1 (5)
İskenderun D.Ç. 4th, promotion group	1 (3)
25 May – Mardan
Tokatspor; 3rd, promotion group	1
Türk Telekom; 5th, promotion group	0
25 May – Atatürk
Adana Demirspor; Group 4 winners	0 (3)
TKİ Tavşanlı Linyitspor; Group 1 winners	0 (5)
25 May – Atatürk
Karadenizspor; Group 3 winners	1 (4)
Çorumspor; 6th, promotion group	1 (2)

Semi-finals
27 May – Mardan
Eyüpspor	1 (3)
Tokatspor	1 (1)
27 May – Atatürk
TKİ Tavşanlı Linyitspor	1
Karadenizspor	0

Final
30 May – Atatürk
Eyüpspor	1
TKİ Tavşanlı Linyitspor	2

=== 3.Lig ===
==== Promotion group ====
Pos	Team	Pld	W	D	L	GF	GA	GD	Pts	Promotion or qualification
1	Bandırmaspor (C, P)	18	12	3	3	31	13	+18	39	Promotion to TFF Second League
2	Balıkesirspor (P)	18	10	4	4	30	16	+14	34	Promotion to TFF Second League
3	Siirtspor (Q)	18	11	1	6	26	20	+6	34	Qualification for Promotion play-offs
4	Kırıkhanspor (Q)	18	10	2	6	22	21	+1	32	Qualification for Promotion play-offs
5	Torbalıspor (Q)	18	7	3	8	25	25	0	24	Qualification for Promotion play-offs
6	Anadolu Üsküdar 1908	18	6	6	6	24	22	+2	24	
7	Pazarspor	18	5	5	8	21	30	−9	20	
8	Keçiörengücü	18	4	6	8	19	28	−9	18	
9	Darıca Gençlerbirliği	18	4	5	9	22	23	−1	17	
10	Araklıspor	18	1	5	12	13	35	−22	8	

Source: Sivritepe, Erdinç
Rules for classification: 1) points; 2) head-to-head points; 3) head-to-head goal difference; 4) head-to-head goals scored; 5) goal difference; 6) number of goals scored.
(C) Champions; (P) Promoted; (Q) Qualified for the phase indicated

==== Play-offs ====
Quarter-finals
15 May – Fethiye İlçe Stadı
Gaziosmanpaşa; Group 1 winners	1
Kırıkhanspor; Promotion group, 4th	2 (aet)
15 May – Fethiye İlçe Stadı
Siirtspor; Promotion group, 3rd	0
Keçiörengücü; Group 3 winners	2
16 May – Muğla Atatürk
Yimpaş Yozgatspor; Group 4 winners	1
Torbalıspor; Promotion group, 5th	0 (aet)
16 May – Muğla Atatürk
Menemen Belediye; Group 2 winners	1 (7)
Malatya Belediye; Group 5 winners	1 (8)

Semi-finals
18 May – Fethiye İlçe Stadı
Kırıkhanspor	1
Keçiörengücü	2
19 May – Muğla Atatürk
Yimpaş Yozgatspor	0
Malatya Belediye	1

Final
22 May – Fethiye İlçe Stadı
Keçiörengücü	0 (3)
Malatya Belediye	0 (5)

== National team ==
=== Friendlies ===
12 August 2009	Ukraine	0–3	Turkey	Lobanovsky Dynamo Stadium, Kyiv
			Şanlı 58'; Çetin 61'; Altıntop 66'	Referee: Darko Sheferi (Slovenia)

3 March 2010	Turkey	2–0	Honduras	BJK İnönü Stadium, Istanbul
	Güngör 41'; Altıntop 55'	(Report)

22 May 2010	Turkey	2–1	Czech Republic	Red Bull Arena, Harrison
	Turan 31'; Kahveci 48'	(Report)	Černý 81'

26 May 2010	Turkey	2–0	Northern Ireland	Veterans Stadium, New Britain
	Yıldırım 48'; Şentürk 72'	(Report)

29 May 2010	United States	2–1	Turkey	Lincoln Financial Field, Philadelphia
	Altidore 58'; Dempsey 75'	(Report)	Turan 27'

=== 2010 FIFA World Cup qualifiers ===
5 September 2009	Turkey	4–2	Estonia	Kadir Has Stadium, Kayseri
21:00 UTC+3	Şanlı 29', 72'; Yıldırım 37'; Turan 62'	Report	Voskoboinikov 7'; Vassiljev 52'	Attendance: 28,569; Referee: Tommy Skjerven (Norway)

9 September 2009	Bosnia and Herzegovina	1–1	Turkey	Bilino Polje, Zenica
20:00 UTC+2	Salihović 25'	Report	Belözoğlu 4'	Attendance: 14,000; Referee: Olegário Benquerença (Portugal)

10 October 2009	Belgium	2–0	Turkey	King Baudouin Stadium, Brussels
20:45 UTC+2	Mpenza 8', 84'	Report		Attendance: 30,131; Referee: Matteo Trefoloni (Italy)

14 October 2009	Turkey	2–0	Armenia	Bursa Atatürk Stadium, Bursa
21:00 UTC+3	Altıntop 16'; Çetin 28'	Report		Attendance: 16,200; Referee: Martin Hansson (Sweden)
