= 2009–10 TFF 2. Lig =

Turkish football season

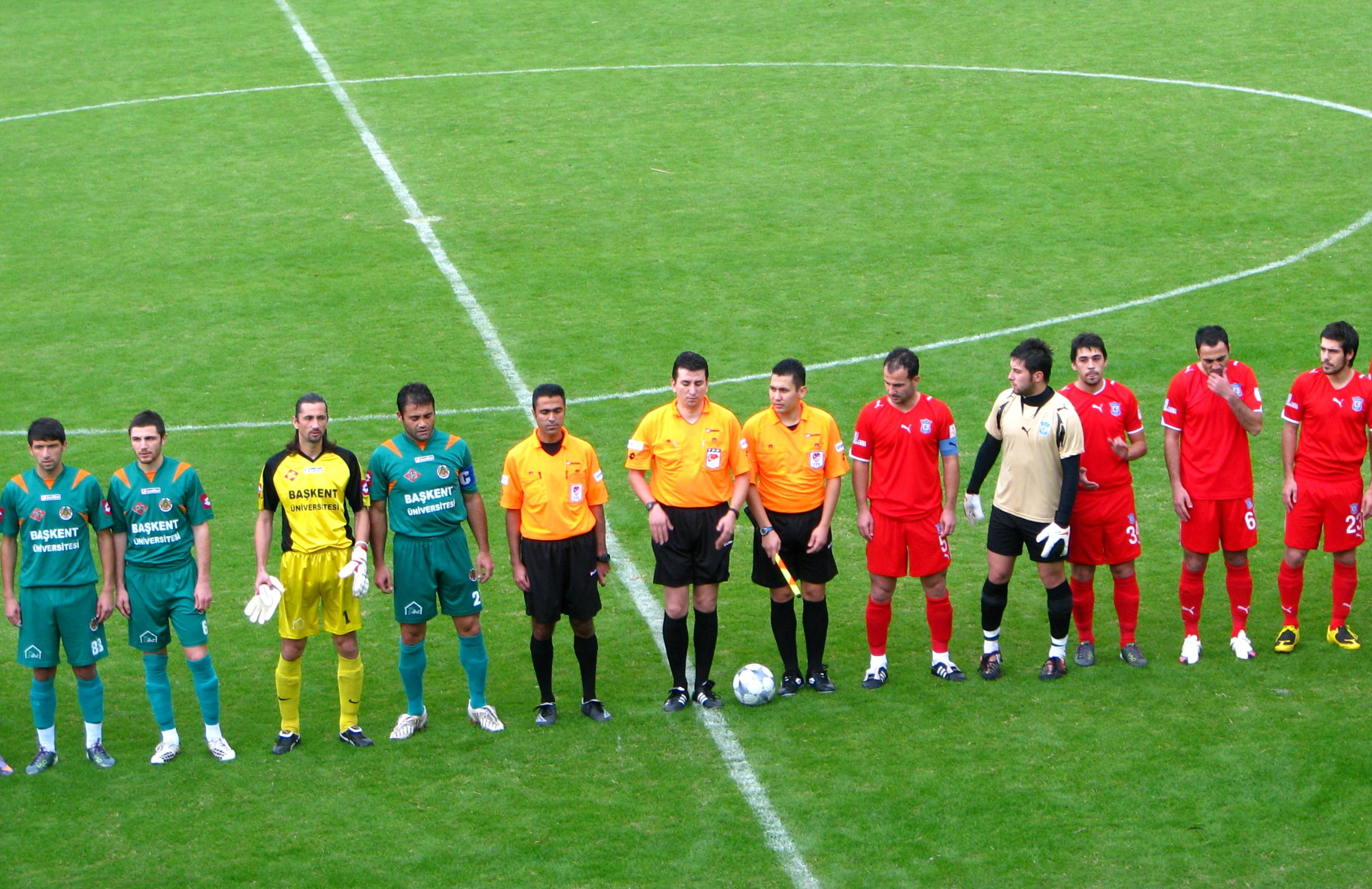
TFF Second League match between Alanyaspor and Çankırı Belediyespor

The 2009–10 TFF Second League season is the ninth since its introduction as the third level of the Turkish football pyramid and the fifth consecutive season where the current format is being used. It began on 30 August 2009 with the first matches of the ranking groups and will end in late May 2010 with the last matches of the promotion playoffs.

== Competition format ==
The 2009–10 season started with 45 teams distributed over four "ranking groups". Each ranking group comprised eleven teams (with the exception of Group 3, which featured twelve teams) according to geographical criteria. The teams of each group played a conventional double round-robin schedule against the other teams of their group.

Upon conclusion of the ranking groups, the best two sides of each eleven-team group and the best three sides of the twelve-team group advanced to the "promotion group", while the remaining nine teams remained in their respective groups, which were now called "classification groups". The teams of the classification groups retained their complete records in the process. As in the previous round, each team played a double round-robin schedule against the other teams of its respective group.

A total of three promotion spots to the TFF First League were played out. Two of them were reserved for the best two teams of the promotion group, which were directly promoted. The third spot was decided through a play-off round and was competed among the teams ranked third through sixth of the promotion group and the winners of the four classification groups. The bottom three teams of the classification groups were directly relegated to the TFF Third League.

== Teams ==
Locations of teams in the 2009–10 TFF Second League.
Key: Red – Promotion Group, Black – CG1, Blue – CG2, Green – CG3, Purple – CG4

Team	Location	Stadium	Capacity	Group	Key in map
Adana Demirspor	Adana	Adana 5 Ocak Stadium	14,085	Classification group 4	ADD
Adıyamanspor	Adıyaman	Adıyaman Atatürk Stadium	8,596	Classification group 4	ADI
Akçaabat Sebatspor	Trabzon	Akçaabat Fatih Stadium	6,238	Classification group 3	ASB
Akhisar Belediyespor	Manisa	Akhisar Belediye Stadium	2,918	Promotion group	AKH
Alanyaspor	Antalya	Alanya Milli Egemenlik Stadium	3,750	Classification group 2	ALA
Belediye Vanspor	Van	Van Atatürk Stadium	10,500	Classification group 4	VAN
Beykozspor 1908	Istanbul	Beykoz Stadium	3,500	Classification group 1	BEY
Bozüyükspor	Bozüyük	Bozüyük İlçe Stadium		Classification group 1	BOZ
Bugsaşspor	Ankara	Ankara Ostim Stadium	4,271	Classification group 3	BUG
Çankırı Belediyespor	Çankırı	Çankırı Atatürk Stadium	4,410	Classification group 3	ÇAN
Çorumspor	Çorum	Dr. Turhan Kılıççıoğlu Stadium	11,263	Promotion group	ÇOR
Denizli Belediyespor	Denizli	Denizli Atatürk Stadium	15,247	Classification group 2	DEN
Diyarbakır Belediye Diskispor	Diyarbakır	Seyrantepe Diski Spor Tesisleri Stadium	1,540	Classification group 4	DIS
Elazığspor	Elazığ	Elazığ Atatürk Stadium	13,923	Classification group 4	ELA
Erzurumspor	Erzurum	Cemal Gürsel Stadium	17,000	Classification group 3	ERZ
Etimesgut Şekerspor	Ankara	Ankara Ostim Stadium	4,271	Promotion group	ETI
Eyüpspor	Istanbul	Eyüp Stadium	2,500	Classification group 2	EYP
Fethiyespor	Muğla	Fethiye Şehir Stadium	8,372	Classification group 2	FET
Gebzespor	Kocaeli	Gebze Ilçe Stadium	8,000	Classification group 1	GEB
Göztepe	İzmir	İzmir Alsancak Stadium	15,358	Promotion group	GÖZ
Güngören Belediyespor	Istanbul	Mimar Yahya Baş Stadium	7,589	Promotion group	GÜN
İskenderun Demir Çelikspor	İskenderun	İskenderun 5 Temmuz Stadium	12,390	Promotion group	İDÇ
İstanbulspor	Istanbul	Bahelievler İl Özel İdare Stadium	4,350	Classification group 2	İST
Kahramanmaraşspor	Kahramanmaraş	Hanefi Mahçiçek Stadium	9,169	Classification group 4	KMM
Karsspor	Kars	Kars Şehir Stadium	5,000	Classification group 3	KRS
Kırşehirspor	Kırşehir	Kırşehir Ahi Stadium	7,500	Classification group 3	KIR
Konya Şekerspor	Konya	Recep Konuk Spor Tesisleri Stadium	2,128	Classification group 2	KŞE
Körfez	Kocaeli	Izmit Alparslan Türkeş Stadium	1,790	Classification group 1	KÖR
Malatyaspor	Malatya	Malatya İnönü Stadium	10,411	Classification group 4	MAL
Mardinspor	Mardin	21 Kasım Stadium	5,700	Classification group 4	MAR
Ofspor	Trabzon	Of Ilçe Stadium	2,303	Classification group 3	OF
Pendikspor	Istanbul	Pendik Stadium	2,500	Classification group 1	PEN
Pursaklarspor	Ankara	Bağlum Belediye Stadium	20,000	Classification group 3	PUR
Sakaryaspor	Adapazarı	Sakarya Atatürk Stadium	13,216	Classification group 1	SAK
Sarıyer	Istanbul	Yusuf Ziya Öniş Stadium		Classification group 2	SAR
Şanlıurfaspor	Şanlıurfa	Şanlıurfa GAP Stadium	28,965	Promotion group	ŞAN
Tarsus Idman Yurdu	Tarsus	Tarsus Buhanettin Kocamaz Stadium	4,201	Classification group 4	TİY
Tepecik	Istanbul	Tepecik Belediye Stadium	3,000	Classification group 2	TEP
TKİ Tavşanlı Linyitspor	Kütahya	Tavşanlı Ada Ilçe Stadium		Classification group 1	TKİ
Tokatspor	Tokat	Gaziosmanpaşa Stadium	5,762	Promotion group	TOK
Trabzon Karadenizspor	Trabzon	Ahmet Suat Özyazıcı Stadium		Classification group 3	TKA
Turgutluspor	Manisa	Turgutlu 7 Eylül Stadium	4,100	Classification group 2	TUR
Türk Telekomspor	Ankara	Türk Telekom Stadium	1,603	Promotion group	TEL
Yalovaspor	Yalova	Yalova Atatürk Stadium	8,980	Classification group 1	YAL
Zeytinburnuspor	Istanbul	Zeytinburnu Stadium	16,000	Classification group 1	ZEY

== Ranking groups ==
=== Group 1 ===
Pos	Team	Pld	W	D	L	GF	GA	GD	Pts	Qualification or relegation
1	Türk Telekomspor (A)	20	11	5	4	33	22	+11	38	Qualification for Promotion group
2	Güngören Belediye Spor (A)	20	10	5	5	30	25	+5	35	Qualification for Promotion group
3	Körfez Belediyespor	20	7	9	4	29	21	+8	30	
4	Pendikspor	20	8	5	7	26	25	+1	29 (Note: PEN 2–1 GEB; GEB 1–2 PEN)	
5	Gebzespor	20	8	5	7	31	26	+5	29	
6	TKİ Tavşanlı Linyitspor	20	7	7	6	26	16	+10	28	
7	Bozüyükspor	20	7	6	7	36	33	+3	27	
8	Yalovaspor	20	6	8	6	30	30	0	26	
9	Sakaryaspor	20	5	5	10	23	26	−3	20	
10	Zeytinburnuspor	20	4	7	9	21	42	−21	19	
11	Beykozspor 1908	20	3	6	11	17	36	−19	15	

Source: Turkish Football Federation
Rules for classification: 1) points; 2) head-to-head points; 3) head-to-head goal difference; 4) head-to-head goals scored; 5) goal difference; 6) number of goals scored.
(A) Advance to a further round

=== Group 2 ===
==== Group table ====
Pos	Team	Pld	W	D	L	GF	GA	GD	Pts	Qualification or relegation
1	Akhisar Belediyespor (A)	20	12	7	1	41	17	+24	43	Qualification for Promotion group
2	Göztepe (A)	20	9	7	4	20	14	+6	34	Qualification for Promotion group
3	Turgutluspor	20	9	6	5	25	17	+8	33	
4	Alanyaspor	20	8	6	6	24	26	−2	30	
5	Konya Şekerspor	20	6	11	3	32	18	+14	29 (Note: KŞE 0–0 EYÜ; EYÜ 0–0 KŞE)	
6	Eyüpspor	20	8	5	7	20	21	−1	29	
7	Sarıyer	20	6	7	7	23	28	−5	25	
8	İstanbulspor	20	5	5	10	25	33	−8	20	
9	Tepecikspor	20	5	4	11	26	33	−7	19	
10	Fethiyespor	20	4	6	10	17	31	−14	18	
11	Denizli Belediyespor	20	3	6	11	24	39	−15	15	

Source: Turkish Football Federation
Rules for classification: 1) points; 2) head-to-head points; 3) head-to-head goal difference; 4) head-to-head goals scored; 5) goal difference; 6) number of goals scored.
(A) Advance to a further round

==== Top goalscorers ====
- Last updated on December 27, 2009

Scorer	Team	Goals
(Turkey) Doğan Şahin	Akhisar Belediyespor	12
(Turkey) Murat Gürbüzerol	Konya Şekerspor	11
(Turkey) Mustafa Kocabey	Turgutluspor	9
(Turkey) Fatih Koyugölge	Denizli Belediyespor	8
(Turkey) Murat Deniz	Fethiyespor	8
(Turkey) Sinan Pektemek	Sarıyer	8
(Turkey) Taner Demirbaş	Alanyaspor	8
(Turkey) Özhan Keskinkale	Akhisar Belediyespor	7
(Turkey) Tuncay Süren	Akhisar Belediyespor	7
(Turkey) Cafercan Aksu	Konya Şekerspor	6

=== Group 3 ===
Pos	Team	Pld	W	D	L	GF	GA	GD	Pts	Qualification or relegation
1	Etimesgut Şekerspor (A)	22	13	5	4	40	19	+21	44	Qualification for Promotion group
2	Tokatspor (A)	22	13	4	5	33	18	+15	43	Qualification for Promotion group
3	Çorumspor (A)	22	11	7	4	29	16	+13	40	Qualification for Promotion group
4	Bugsaşspor	22	11	6	5	35	17	+18	39	
5	Trabzon Karadenizspor	22	10	5	7	34	30	+4	35	
6	Çankırı Belediyespor	22	9	5	8	25	24	+1	32	
7	Akçaabat Sebatspor	22	8	4	10	26	36	−10	28	
8	Pursaklarspor	22	7	6	9	24	23	+1	27 (Note: PUR 2–0 KRS; KRS 1–0 PUR)	
9	Karsspor	22	8	3	11	33	27	+6	27	
10	Ofspor	22	6	6	10	27	40	−13	24	
11	Kırşehirspor	22	5	6	11	24	34	−10	21	
12	Erzurumspor (Note: Erzurumspor were docked three points because of unknown reasons.)	22	0	5	17	7	53	−46	2	

Source: Turkish Football Federation
Rules for classification: 1) points; 2) head-to-head points; 3) head-to-head goal difference; 4) head-to-head goals scored; 5) goal difference; 6) number of goals scored.
(A) Advance to a further round

=== Group 4 ===
Pos	Team	Pld	W	D	L	GF	GA	GD	Pts	Qualification or relegation
1	Şanlıurfaspor (A)	20	11	6	3	34	20	+14	39	Qualification for Promotion group
2	İskenderun Demir Çelikspor (A)	20	11	5	4	30	16	+14	38	Qualification for Promotion group
3	Adana Demirspor	20	9	7	4	36	22	+14	34	
4	Tarsus Idman Yurdu	20	8	9	3	24	25	−1	33	
5	Mardinspor	20	9	5	6	30	16	+14	32	
6	Adıyamanspor	20	7	6	7	15	15	0	27	
7	Kahramanmaraşspor	20	7	4	9	22	28	−6	25 (Note: VAN 2–1 KMM; KMM 2–0 VAN)	
8	Belediye Vanspor	20	7	4	9	22	33	−11	25	
9	Diyarbakır Bld. Diskispor	20	5	6	9	17	28	−11	21	
10	Malatyaspor	20	2	6	12	8	29	−21	12 (Note: MAL 1–0 ELA; ELA 1–1 MAL)	
11	Elazığspor	20	2	6	12	19	35	−16	12	

Source: Turkish Football Federation
Rules for classification: 1) points; 2) head-to-head points; 3) head-to-head goal difference; 4) head-to-head goals scored; 5) goal difference; 6) number of goals scored.
(A) Advance to a further round

== Promotion group ==
=== Group table ===
Pos	Team	Pld	W	D	L	GF	GA	GD	Pts	Qualification or relegation
1	Güngören Belediyespor (P)	16	9	4	3	22	13	+9	31	Promotion to TFF First League
2	Akhisar Belediyespor (P)	16	9	3	4	23	15	+8	30	Promotion to TFF First League
3	Tokatspor	16	7	3	6	18	16	+2	24	Qualification for Promotion play-offs
4	İskenderun Demir Çelikspor	16	6	5	5	20	16	+4	23	Qualification for Promotion play-offs
5	Türk Telekomspor	16	7	1	8	18	19	−1	22 (Note: TEL 4–1 ÇOR; ÇOR 1–1 TEL)	Qualification for Promotion play-offs
6	Çorumspor	16	6	4	6	22	25	−3	22	Qualification for Promotion play-offs
7	Etimesgut Şekerspor	16	5	3	8	15	24	−9	18	
8	Göztepe	16	4	4	8	13	16	−3	16	
9	Şanlıurfaspor	16	3	5	8	21	28	−7	14	

Source: Turkish Football Federation
Rules for classification: 1) points; 2) head-to-head points; 3) head-to-head goal difference; 4) head-to-head goals scored; 5) goal difference; 6) number of goals scored.
(P) Promoted

=== Results ===
Home \ Away	AKH	ÇOR	ETİ	GÖZ	GÜN	İSK	ŞAN	TOK	TEL
Akhisar Belediyespor		2–2			1–2		2–1	2–2	1–0
Çorumspor			0–1		1–1	1–2		2–1	1–1
Etimesgut Şekerspor	0–2			0–0		2–2	2–3		2–0
Göztepe	1–2	0–2			2–0	0–0	1–0		
Güngören Belediyespor		3–3	0–0	2–1				0–1	1–0
İskenderun D.Ç.	0–1	3–0	2–0	0–2	1–2		3–3		
Şanlıurfaspor	2–2	2–1	0–1		0–3			0–2	5–0
Tokatspor	1–2		2–0	1–1		0–2	1–1		
Türk Telekomspor	0–2	4–1	5–0	1–0		3–0		1–0	

Source: http://www.tff.org/default.aspx?pageID=637
Legend: Blue = home team win; Yellow = draw; Red = away team win.

=== Top goalscorers ===
Including matches played on April 5, 2010

Scorer	Team	Goals
(Turkey) Ahmet Güven	Etimesgut Şekerspor	21
(Turkey) Doğan Şahin	Akhisar Belediyespor	17
(Turkey) Yaşar Çetin	Tokatspor	17
(Turkey) Murat Bölükbaş	İskenderun D.Ç.	15
(Turkey) Taylan Eliaçık	Şanlıurfaspor	14
(Turkey) Abdullah Halman	Şanlıurfaspor	12
(Turkey) Arif Çoban	Tokatspor	11
(Turkey) Hakan Arslan	Güngören Belediyespor	11
(Turkey) Hüseyin Kala	Etimesgut Şekerspor	10
(Turkey) Tuncay Süren	Akhisar Belediyespor	10

== Classification groups ==
=== Classification group 1 ===
Pos	Team	Pld	W	D	L	GF	GA	GD	Pts	Qualification or relegation
1	TKİ Tavşanlı Linyitspor	36	17	10	9	58	30	+28	61	Qualification for Promotion play-offs
2	Körfez Belediyespor	36	14	12	10	52	40	+12	54	
3	Gebzespor	36	15	8	13	52	49	+3	53	
4	Pendikspor	36	13	11	12	48	47	+1	50	
5	Sakaryaspor	36	13	9	14	50	43	+7	48	
6	Bozüyükspor	36	12	11	13	61	56	+5	47	
7	Yalovaspor (R)	36	11	12	13	52	58	−6	45	Relegation to TFF Third League
8	Beykozspor 1908 (R)	36	8	9	19	35	67	−32	33	Relegation to TFF Third League
9	Zeytinburnuspor (R)	36	7	10	19	39	73	−34	31	Relegation to TFF Third League

Source: Turkish Football Federation
Rules for classification: 1) points; 2) head-to-head points; 3) head-to-head goal difference; 4) head-to-head goals scored; 5) goal difference; 6) number of goals scored.
(R) Relegated

=== Classification group 2 ===
Pos	Team	Pld	W	D	L	GF	GA	GD	Pts	Qualification or relegation
1	Eyüpspor	36	17	8	11	42	32	+10	59	Qualification for Promotion play-offs
2	Konya Şekerspor	36	14	16	6	59	30	+29	58	
3	Turgutluspor	36	15	6	15	46	51	−5	51	
4	Sarıyer	36	14	8	14	45	45	0	50	
5	Fethiyespor	36	12	10	14	41	50	−9	46	
6	Alanyaspor	36	11	11	14	47	60	−13	44	
7	Tepecikspor (R)	36	13	5	18	47	53	−6	44	Relegation to TFF Third League
8	İstanbulspor (R)	36	10	8	18	50	59	−9	38	Relegation to TFF Third League
9	Denizli Belediyespor (R)	36	7	10	19	40	67	−27	31	Relegation to TFF Third League

Source: Turkish Football Federation
Rules for classification: 1) points; 2) head-to-head points; 3) head-to-head goal difference; 4) head-to-head goals scored; 5) goal difference; 6) number of goals scored.
(R) Relegated

=== Classification group 3 ===
Pos	Team	Pld	W	D	L	GF	GA	GD	Pts	Qualification or relegation
1	Trabzon Karadenizspor	38	20	8	10	60	37	+23	68	Qualification for Promotion play-offs
2	Bugsaşspor	38	19	9	10	60	34	+26	66	
3	Akçaabat Sebatspor	38	17	5	16	52	59	−7	56	
4	Ofspor	38	15	9	14	50	54	−4	54	
5	Çankırı Belediyespor	38	15	7	16	43	39	+4	52	
6	Pursaklarspor	38	13	12	13	42	39	+3	51	
7	Karsspor (R)	38	14	9	15	52	41	+11	51	Relegation to TFF Third League
8	Kırşehirspor (R)	38	9	10	19	46	57	−11	37	Relegation to TFF Third League
9	Erzurumspor (Note: Erzurumspor were docked an additional three points (six in total) because the team withdrew from the league after the first group phase. All remaining matches were awarded to their respective opponents with a score of 3–0.) (R)	38	0	5	33	7	101	−94	−1	Relegation to TFF Third League

Source: Turkish Football Federation
Rules for classification: 1) points; 2) head-to-head points; 3) head-to-head goal difference; 4) head-to-head goals scored; 5) goal difference; 6) number of goals scored.
(R) Relegated

=== Classification group 4 ===
Pos	Team	Pld	W	D	L	GF	GA	GD	Pts	Qualification or relegation
1	Adana Demirspor	36	17	10	9	64	42	+22	61	Qualification for Promotion play-offs
2	Adıyamanspor	36	17	9	10	42	26	+16	60	
3	Belediye Vanspor	36	18	6	12	55	45	+10	60	
4	Tarsus Idman Yurdu	36	13	15	8	51	42	+9	54	
5	Elazığspor	36	11	12	13	44	46	−2	45	
6	Mardinspor	36	11	11	14	45	37	+8	44	
7	Diyarbakır Bld. Diskispor (R)	36	11	10	15	38	53	−15	43	Relegation to TFF Third League
8	Kahramanmaraşspor (R)	36	8	9	19	38	63	−25	33	Relegation to TFF Third League
9	Malatyaspor (R)	36	3	9	24	16	67	−51	18	Relegation to TFF Third League

Source: Turkish Football Federation
Rules for classification: 1) points; 2) head-to-head points; 3) head-to-head goal difference; 4) head-to-head goals scored; 5) goal difference; 6) number of goals scored.
(R) Relegated

== Promotion play-offs ==
The teams placed third through sixth of the promotion group and the four winners of the classification groups competed in a single-elimination playoff for the last promotion spot.

=== Quarterfinals ===
Team 1	Score	Team 2
Tokatspor	1–0	Türk Telekomspor
Trabzon Karadenizspor	1–1 (5–3 p)	Çorumspor
Eyüpspor	1–1 (6–4 p)	İskenderun Demir Çelikspor
Adana Demirspor	0–0 (3–5 p)	Tavşanlı Linyitspor

=== Semifinals ===
Team 1	Score	Team 2
Tokatspor	0–0 (2–4 p)	Eyüpspor
Trabzon Karadenizspor	0–1	Tavşanlı Linyitspor

=== Final ===
Team 1	Score	Team 2
Eyüpspor	1–2	Tavşanlı Linyitspor

== See also ==
- 2009–10 Süper Lig
- 2009–10 TFF First League
- 2009–10 Türkiye Kupası
