= 2011–12 TFF 2. Lig =

TFF Second League
- Season: 2011–12
- Champions: White Group; Şanlıurfaspor; Red Group; 1461 Trabzon
- Promoted: Şanlıurfaspor; 1461 Trabzon; Adana Demirspor
- Relegated: Diyarbakırspor; Çorumspor; Kocaelispor; Altınordu A.Ş. Adıyamanspor; Mardinspor

The 2011–12 TFF Second League (also known as Spor-Toto Second League due to sponsorship reasons) was the 11th season of the league since its establishment in 2001 as the third level division; and the 49th season of the second league in Turkish football since its establishment in 1963–64 (before 2001 league was played as second level division). The start date of the league was 4 September 2011 and the end date was 20 May 2012.

The league was played with 34 teams, 17 in the White group and 17 in the Red group. The winner of each group was promoted to the 2012–13 TFF First League. A play off series was played among the best four remaining teams in each group to determine the third team to promote. The bottom three teams in each group were relegated to the 2012–13 TFF Third League.

== Teams ==
Altay and Diyarbakırspor were relegated from 2010–11 TFF First League. Altınordu, Denizli Bel., Gaziosmanpaşaspor, Kırklarelispor, Tepecikspor, Ünyespor were promoted from 2010–11 TFF Third League

Locations of teams in the 2011–12 TFF Second League.
Key: Black – White Group, Red – Red Group

== Team summaries ==
Team	Group	Location	Stadium	Capacity	President	Coach
Adana Demirspor	Red	Adana	Adana 5 Ocak Stadium	14,085	Mustafa Tuncel	Ali Güneş
Adıyamanspor	White	Adıyaman	Adıyaman Atatürk Stadium	8,596	Nöyfel Bozdoğan	Faik Demir
Alanyaspor	White	Antalya	Alanya Milli Egemenlik Stadium	3,750	Hakan Dizdaroğlu	Yusuf Tokaç
Altay	White	İzmir	İzmir Alsancak Stadium	15,358	Ahmet Taşpınar	Mehmet Altıarmak
Altınordu	Red	İzmir	Buca İlçe Stadium	6,231	Mustafa Bilen	Metin Çelikdelen
Balıkesirspor	Red	Balıkesir	Balıkesir Atatürk Stadium	5,000	Tuna Aktürk	Mesut Dilsöz
Bandırmaspor	White	Balıkesir	Bandırma 17 Eylül Stadium	5,400	Mehmet Kılkışlı	Turgut Uçar
Beypazarı Şekerspor	White	Ankara	Ankara Ostim Stadium	4,271	Orhan Kapelman	Feridun Yarkın
1461 Trabzon	Red	Trabzon	Ahmet Suat Özyazıcı Stadium	7,700	Metin Özke	Zafer Hızarcı
Bozüyükspor	White	Bozüyük	Bozüyük İlçe Stadium	4,100	Doğmuş Hilmi Üneral	Gürsel Kılıç
Bugsaşspor	White	Ankara	Ankara Ostim Stadium	4,271	A. Raşit Civan	Vedat İnceefe
Çankırı Belediyespor	White	Çankırı	Çankırı Atatürk Stadium	4,410	Sevda Karaali	Hakan Yılmaz
Çorumspor	White	Çorum	Dr. Turhan Kılıççıoğlu Stadium	11,263	İbrahim Eceviş	Sedat Özbağ
Denizli Belediyespor	Red	Denizli	Denizli Atatürk Stadium	15,427	Tanju Beştaş	Yaşar Güngör
Diyarbakırspor	White	Diyarbakır	Diyarbakır Atatürk Stadium	12,963	Nurullah Edemen	Kemal Zeydan
Eyüpspor	Red	Istanbul	Eyüp Stadium	2,500	Şevket Sever	Turan Özyazanlar
Fethiyespor	Red	Muğla	Fethiye Şehir Stadium	8,372	İsmail Öztürk	Levent Numanoğlu
Gaziosmanpaşa	White	Istanbul	Gaziosmanpaşa Stadium	2,850	Mehmet Öztürk	Hasan Saka
İskenderun DÇ	White	İskenderun	İskenderun 5 Temmuz Stadium	12,390	Ali Cengiz Gül	Rahim Zafer
Kırklarelispor	Red	Kırklareli	Kırklareli Atatürk Stadium	2,000	Volkan Can	Bilgin Erdem
Kocaelispor	Red	İzmit	İzmit İsmet Paşa Stadium	16,800	Serkan Toprakoğlu	Soner Alp
K. Torku Şekerspor	Red	Konya	Recep Konuk Spor Tesisleri	2,128	Yavuz Erence	Metin Altınay
Kocaeli FK	White	Kocaeli	Izmit Alparslan Türkeş Stadium	1,790	İsmail Cenk Karaloğlu	Ahmet Yıldırım
Mardinspor	White	Mardin	21 Kasım Stadium	5,700	Murat Gelmedi	Yaşar Şen
Ofspor	Red	Trabzon	Of Ilçe Stadium	2,303	Ercan Saral	Ahmet Kazım Ertem
Pendikspor	Red	Istanbul	Pendik Stadium	2,500	Murat Şahsuvaroğlu	Abdülkerim Durmaz
Kızılcahamamspor	Red	Ankara	Bağlum Belediye Stadium	20,000	Zeynep Bekçe	Tahir Çopur
Sarıyer	White	Istanbul	Yusuf Ziya Öniş Stadium	10,000	Mehmet Akdağ	İlker Yağcıoğlu
Şanlıurfaspor	Red	Şanlıurfa	Şanlıurfa GAP Stadium	28,965	Habib Arslan	Kemal Kılıç
Tepecikspor	White	Istanbul	Tepecik Belediye Stadium	3,000	Osman Eyüboğlu	Enver Şen
Tokatspor	Red	Tokat	Gaziosmanpaşa Stadium	5,762	Ahmet Sami Ülkü	Suat Kaya
Turgutluspor	White	Manisa	Turgutlu 7 Eylül Stadium	4,100	Murat Ayhan	Yusuf Şimşek
Türk Telekomspor	Red	Ankara	Türk Telekom Stadium	1,603	Celalettin Dinçer	İsmet Taşdemir
Ünyespor	Red	Ordu	Ünye İlçe Stadium	10,340	Abdülkafi Keskin	Ahmet Ceyhan
Malatyaspor	White	Malatya	Malatya İnönü Stadium	10,411	Memet Emin Katipoğlu	Cafer Aydın

== White Group ==
=== White Group league table ===
Pos	Team	Pld	W	D	L	GF	GA	GD	Pts	Qualification or relegation
1	Şanlıurfaspor (P)	32	23	6	3	63	20	+43	75	Promotion to TFF First League
2	Balıkesirspor	32	20	8	4	73	32	+41	68	Qualification for Promotion Playoffs
3	Bozüyükspor	32	20	5	7	58	33	+25	65	Qualification for Promotion Playoffs
4	Bugsaşspor	32	15	11	6	49	29	+20	56	Qualification for Promotion Playoffs
5	Turgutluspor	32	16	6	10	56	33	+23	54	Qualification for Promotion Playoffs
6	Tepecikspor A.Ş.	32	14	10	8	44	39	+5	52	
7	Altay	32	15	6	11	48	31	+17	51	
8	Gaziosmanpaşa	32	14	4	14	44	40	+4	46	
9	Körfez İskenderun Spor	32	14	4	14	45	42	+3	46	
10	Konya Şekerspor	32	13	5	14	45	40	+5	44	
11	Ofspor A.Ş.	32	11	10	11	45	41	+4	43	
12	Pendikspor	32	8	16	8	36	31	+5	40	
13	Yeni Malatyaspor	32	9	9	14	45	43	+2	36	
14	Tokatspor	32	8	4	20	27	57	−30	28	
15	Diyarbakırspor (R)	32	6	7	19	27	56	−29	25	Relegation to TFF Third League
16	Çorumspor (R)	32	2	10	20	19	57	−38	16	Relegation to TFF Third League
17	Kocaelispor (R)	32	2	3	27	30	130	−100	9	Relegation to TFF Third League

Source: TFF Second League page
Rules for classification: 1) points; 2) goal difference; 3) number of goals scored.
(P) Promoted; (R) Relegated

=== White Group positions by round ===
Team ╲ Round	1	2	3	4	5	6	7	8	9	10	11	12	13	14	15	16	17	18	19	20	21	22	23	24	25	26	27	28	29	30	31	32	33	34
Şanlıurfaspor	11	2	2	2	1	1	2	1	1	1	3	3	3	3	1	1	2	2	2	1	1	1	1	1	1	1	1	1	1	1	1	1	1	1
Bozüyükspor	3	1	1	1	3	3	1	2	2	2	1	2	2	2	2	4	1	1	1	2	3	3	3	3	3	3	3	3	3	3	3	3	3	3
Balıkesirspor	4	3	3	3	2	2	3	3	4	3	2	1	1	1	3	2	3	3	3	3	2	2	2	2	2	2	2	2	2	2	2	2	2	2
Altay	10	4	4	4	4	4	4	4	7	4	4	4	4	4	4	3	4	4	4	4	4	4	4	4	4	4	5	4	7	7	7	7	7	7
Tepecikspor A.Ş.	6	11	11	11	6	6	5	5	6	7	6	6	6	6	5	8	8	8	8	6	7	7	7	7	7	7	7	8	6	6	6	6	6	6
Turgutluspor	15	5	5	5	5	5	8	7	5	6	7	8	8	8	6	5	6	6	6	7	8	8	8	8	8	8	8	6	5	5	5	5	5	5
Bugsaşspor	12	6	6	6	9	9	9	10	10	10	9	7	7	7	7	6	5	5	5	5	5	5	5	5	5	5	4	5	4	4	4	4	4	4
Körfez İskenderun Spor	13	9	9	9	8	8	7	6	3	5	5	5	5	5	8	7	7	7	7	8	6	6	6	6	6	6	6	7	9	9	9	9	9	9
Ofspor A.Ş.	9	15	15	15	14	14	15	15	15	15	13	10	10	10	9	9	9	9	9	9	11	11	11	11	11	11	10	11	11	11	11	11	11	11
Pendikspor	2	8	8	8	7	7	6	8	8	8	8	9	9	9	10	10	10	10	10	11	12	12	12	12	12	12	12	12	12	12	12	12	12	12
Konya Şekerspor	7	12	12	12	13	13	14	14	14	11	11	12	12	12	11	12	12	12	12	10	10	10	10	10	10	10	11	9	10	10	10	10	10	10
Gaziosmanpaşa	8	14	14	14	11	11	13	9	9	9	10	11	11	11	12	11	11	11	11	12	9	9	9	9	9	9	9	10	8	8	8	8	8	8
Yeni Malatyaspor	5	10	10	10	10	10	11	12	12	13	12	13	13	13	13	13	13	13	13	13	13	13	13	13	13	13	13	13	13	13	13	13	13	13
Diyarbakırspor	14	13	13	13	15	15	12	13	13	14	15	14	14	14	14	14	15	15	15	14	15	15	15	15	15	15	14	15	15	15	15	15	15	15
Çorumspor	1	11	11	11	12	12	10	11	11	12	14	15	15	15	15	15	14	14	14	15	16	16	16	16	16	16	16	16	16	16	16	16	16	16
Kocaelispor	17	17	17	17	17	17	17	17	16	16	16	16	16	16	16	17	17	17	17	17	17	17	17	17	17	17	17	17	17	17	17	17	17	17
Tokatspor	16	16	16	16	16	16	16	16	17	17	17	17	17	17	17	16	16	16	16	16	14	14	14	14	14	14	15	14	14	14	14	14	14	14

Source: TFF Second League page

== Red Group ==
=== Red Group league table ===
Pos	Team	Pld	W	D	L	GF	GA	GD	Pts	Qualification or relegation
1	1461 Trabzon (P)	32	17	11	4	50	23	+27	62	Promotion to TFF First League
2	Bandırmaspor	32	16	8	8	37	22	+15	56	Qualification for Promotion Playoffs
3	Adana Demirspor (P)	32	16	7	9	46	31	+15	55	Qualification for Promotion Playoffs
4	Fethiyespor	32	15	9	8	54	38	+16	54	Qualification for Promotion Playoffs
5	Gölbaşıspor A.Ş.	32	15	8	9	48	34	+14	53	Qualification for Promotion Playoffs
6	Kocaeli Birlik Spor	32	13	13	6	39	26	+13	52	
7	Denizli Belediyespor	32	12	9	11	39	32	+7	45	
8	Kırklarelispor	32	11	11	10	34	26	+8	44	
9	Eyüpspor	32	11	11	10	34	35	−1	44	
10	Sarıyer	32	12	7	13	39	37	+2	43	
11	Çankırı Belediyespor	32	11	9	12	40	41	−1	42	
12	Alanyaspor	32	9	15	8	26	28	−2	42	
13	Ünyespor	32	9	13	10	32	32	0	40	
14	Beypazarı Şekerspor	32	10	9	13	37	45	−8	39	
15	Altınordu A.Ş. (R)	32	9	11	12	31	33	−2	38	Relegation to TFF Third League
16	Adıyamanspor (R)	32	4	8	20	23	51	−28	20	Relegation to TFF Third League
17	Mardinspor (R)	32	1	3	28	11	86	−75	6	Relegation to TFF Third League

Source: TFF Second League page
Rules for classification: 1) points; 2) goal difference; 3) number of goals scored.
(P) Promoted; (R) Relegated

=== Red Group positions by round ===
Team ╲ Round	1	2	3	4	5	6	7	8	9	10	11	12	13	14	15	16	17	18	19	20	21	22	23	24	25	26	27	28	29	30	31	32	33	34
Bandırmaspor	3	2	2	2	2	2	1	1	2	1	1	1	1	1	1	1	2	2	2	1	1	1	1	1	1	1	1	1	2	2	2	2	2	2
Gölbaşıspor A.Ş.	6	1	1	1	1	1	2	2	1	2	2	3	3	3	5	5	4	4	4	7	6	6	6	6	6	6	5	5	5	5	5	5	5	5
Fethiyespor	2	6	6	6	6	6	5	5	8	5	3	5	5	5	2	2	1	1	1	2	3	3	3	3	3	3	3	3	4	4	4	4	4	4
Adana Demirspor	4	10	10	10	10	10	6	6	3	3	4	8	8	8	4	4	3	3	3	4	4	4	4	4	4	4	6	6	3	3	3	3	3	3
1461 Trabzon	16	13	13	13	14	14	12	13	10	7	5	4	4	4	3	3	6	6	6	5	2	2	2	2	2	2	2	2	1	1	1	1	1	1
Altınordu A.Ş.	1	5	5	5	9	9	11	7	9	8	6	9	9	9	8	8	10	10	10	10	12	12	12	12	12	12	14	14	15	15	15	15	15	15
Denizli Belediyespor	8	9	9	9	5	5	4	4	6	9	7	6	6	6	10	10	7	7	7	6	9	9	9	9	9	9	9	9	7	7	7	7	7	7
Kocaeli Birlik Spor	10	8	8	8	3	3	3	3	4	4	8	2	2	2	6	6	5	5	5	3	5	5	5	5	5	5	4	4	6	6	6	6	6	6
Kırklarelispor	5	12	12	12	12	12	8	10	11	11	9	7	7	7	9	9	11	11	11	11	7	7	7	7	7	7	7	7	8	8	8	8	8	8
Alanyaspor	11	3	3	3	4	4	7	8	5	6	10	10	10	10	7	7	9	9	9	9	8	8	8	8	8	8	8	8	12	12	12	12	12	12
Eyüpspor	9	4	4	4	8	8	9	9	7	10	11	14	14	14	14	14	14	14	14	13	10	10	10	10	10	10	10	10	9	9	9	9	9	9
Sarıyer	13	7	7	7	7	7	10	11	14	12	12	12	12	12	13	13	8	8	8	8	14	14	14	14	14	14	12	12	10	10	10	10	10	10
Ünyespor	12	14	14	14	13	13	14	14	13	13	13	13	13	13	12	12	15	15	15	14	13	13	13	13	13	13	13	13	13	13	13	13	13	13
Beypazarı Şekerspor	15	11	11	11	11	11	13	15	12	14	14	11	11	11	11	11	13	13	13	15	15	15	15	15	15	15	15	15	14	14	14	14	14	14
Adıyamanspor	7	15	15	15	16	16	15	12	15	15	15	16	16	16	16	16	16	16	16	16	16	16	16	16	16	16	16	16	16	16	16	16	16	16
Çankırı Belediyespor	17	17	17	17	15	15	16	16	16	16	16	15	15	15	15	15	12	12	12	12	11	11	11	11	11	11	11	11	11	11	11	11	11	11
Mardinspor	14	16	16	16	17	17	17	17	17	17	17	17	17	17	17	17	17	17	17	17	17	17	17	17	17	17	17	17	17	17	17	17	17	17

Source: TFF Second League page

== Promotion playoffs ==
- All matches were played at Denizli Atatürk Stadium.

=== Quarterfinals ===
Team 1	Score	Team 2
Adana Demirspor	1–0	Balıkesirspor
Bugsaşspor	2–1	Bandırmaspor
Fethiyespor	1–0	Turgutluspor
Bozüyükspor	1–0	Gölbaşıspor A.Ş.

=== Semifinals ===
Team 1	Score	Team 2
Bugsaşspor	0–0 (8–9 p)	Adana Demirspor
Bozüyükspor	2–2 (5–6 p)	Fethiyespor

=== Final ===
Team 1	Score	Team 2
Adana Demirspor	2–1	Fethiyespor

== See also ==
- 2011–12 Turkish Cup
- 2011–12 Süper Lig
- 2011–12 TFF First League
- 2011–12 TFF Third League
