= Ahmet Taşyürek =

Turkish football manager

Personal information
- Date of birth: 6 July 1972 (age 54)
- Place of birth: Hatay, Turkey

Team information
- Current team: 52 Orduspor (manager)

Managerial career
- Years: Team
- 2005–2007: Antakyaspor
- 2007–2008: Kırıkhanspor
- 2008: Hatayspor (assistant)
- 2008–2010: Kırıkhanspor
- 2011–2012: Kırıkhanspor
- 2013–2015: Hatayspor
- 2015–2016: Ümraniyespor
- 2016–2017: Pendikspor
- 2018: Şanlıurfaspor
- 2018–2020: Ümraniyespor
- 2020: Boluspor
- 2021–2022: Karşıyaka
- 2022–: 52 Orduspor

Ahmet Taşyürek (born 6 July 1972) is a Turkish football manager. He is the manager of 52 Orduspor.
