= Ender Alkan =

Turkish footballer and coach

Ender Alkan (born January 2, 1977, in Zara, Sivas Province) is a Turkish football coach and former player who currently serves as the manager of Darıca Gençlerbirliği. He played as an attacking midfielder, standing at 181 cm.

He has played for the Turkey under-21 team.

He has previously played for Kartalspor, Bursaspor, Denizlispor, Diyarbakırspor, Kasımpaşa SK.
