= Orhangazispor =

Turkish football club

Orhangazi Belediyespor
- Full name: Orhangazi Belediyespor
- Founded: 1982
- Ground: Orhangazi City Stadium, Bursa
- Capacity: 3.000
- Chairman: Necmettin Şahin
- Manager: Zafer Yiğit
- League: Regional Amateur League
- Website: http://www.orhangazispor.org/
Home colours	Away colours

Orhangazi Belediyespor is a football club located in Bursa, Turkey. The team competes in the Regional Amateur League. The club known as Orhangazispor changed into its new name in June 2017.

== Stadium ==
Currently the team plays at Orhangazi City Stadium.
