= Afyonkarahisarspor =

Turkish football club

- Full name: Afyonkarahisarspor
- Nickname: Mor Şimşekler
- Founded: 2005
- Dissolved: 2013
- Ground: Afyon Atatürk Stadium, Afyonkarahisar
- Capacity: 10,000
- Chairman: Hikmet Bülbül
- Manager: Mustafa Meteertem
Home colours	Away colours

Afyonkarahisarspor is a former football team that was founded in 2005 and closed down in the middle of the 2012–2013 season when it withdrew from the Regional Amateur League.

Afyonkarahisarspor, which was founded with the change of name of Afyon Şekerspor, which was promoted to the 3rd League before the 2005–2006 season, when Yeni Afyonspor was closed in 2004, was founded with purple-white colors as a continuation of Afyonspor, but withdrew from the Regional Amateur League on February 1, 2013. 3rd time closed.

He played his matches in Afyon Atatürk Stadium with a capacity of 10,000 people. Their color comes from purple-white, which is also the color of the poppy flower.
