= Oyak Renault G.S.D. =

Turkish sports club

- Full name: Oyak Renault Gençlik ve Spor Derneği
- Founded: 1974
- Dissolved: 2013
- Ground: Oyak Renault Stadı, Bursa
- League: TFF Third League
Home colours	Away colours

Oyak Renault GSD was a sports organisation of Renault Automobile Factory in Bursa. The football club used to played in the TFF Third League, which they were relegated to in 2007. Its basketball section used to play in the top-level Turkish Basketball League.
