= İstanbul Güngörenspor =

Turkish sports club

Güngörenspor
- Full name: İstanbul Güngörenspor
- Founded: 1983
- Ground: Mimar Yahya Baş Stadium, Güngören, Istanbul
- Capacity: 7,589
- League: Istanbul Super Amateur League
- 2015–16: TFF Regional Amateur League 12th Group, 10th (Relegated after play-out)
Home colours	Away colours

İstanbul Güngörenspor (formerly known as Güngören Belediyespor) is a sports club located in Güngören, Istanbul, Turkey. This club was formed as Beyoğlu Kapalıçarşıspor in 1983. They moved to Güngören and changed their name to Güngören Belediyespor in 1994. The club is owned by the municipality of Güngören. This club played in the TFF Second League and promoted to Bank Asya 1. League after extra play-offs in 2007–2008 season and were relegated to TFF Second League after the 2008–2009 season. They changed their name to İstanbul Güngörenspor before the start of the 2011–12 season.

After many promotions and relegations between third and fourth levels of Turkish Football, Güngören B.S. had a chance to promote TFF First League at the end of the 2007 – 2008 season. Though their opponent Adana Demirspor was favourites before the final match at Konya Atatürk Stadium, Güngören B.S. managed to score at the last minute to win 1 – 0 and get promoted.

Following season was hard as expected, Güngören BS tried to secure their place over the relegation zone. Wins against Kasımpaşa S.K. and other title contenders, kept them in mid-table for most of the season. Despite their tries, they were relegated to the Second League after losing 3–1 to Boluspor at away match on May 10, 2009, as 17th.

Güngören BS played 1st Group of Second League in 2009–10 season and qualified to the Promotion Group after finishing second. After finishing 2nd in this group, they returned to the second level immediately. In 2010–11 season, Güngören BS escaped relegation and finished it as 15th. They renamed their name as İstanbul Güngörenspor before the start of the next season, but they finished First League as 17th and relegated to Second League.

Güngörenspor finished Red Group of Second League as 14th in 2012–13 season. But, after finishing Red Group as 17th, they relegated to fourth level. Finally Güngörenspor finished 3rd Group of Third League as last (18th) and relegated to Regional Amateur League in 2014–15 season. They finished 12th Group of RAL as 10th and faced with Kartal Bulvarspor at play-outs in 2015–16 season. They lost this match as 2–1 on 8 May 2016 and relegated to Istanbul Super Amateur League after three consecutive relegations.

== Current squad ==
As of 15 October 2011 Note: Flags indicate national team as defined under FIFA eligibility rules; some limited exceptions apply. Players may hold more than one non-FIFA nationality.

No.	Pos.	Nation	Player
2	MF	TUR	Erhan Yilmaz
3	DF	TUR	Mustafa Ün
4	DF	TUR	Ibrahim Arikan
5	MF	TUR	Kürsat Aydin
7	FW	TUR	Hakan Albayrak
8	MF	TUR	Özgür Ergün
9	FW	TUR	Mehmet Tülümen
11	FW	TUR	Semih Türe
14	FW	GHA	Benjamin Boateng
17	FW	TUR	Tunc Behram
19	MF	TUR	Sinan Ayar
23	MF	GHA	Obed Owusu

No.	Pos.	Nation	Player
24	DF	TUR	Ibrahim Necipoglu
25	DF	TUR	Yunus Ceylan
28	DF	TUR	Hasan Yigit
30	FW	TUR	Mehmet Sen
33	GK	TUR	Orhan Altay
61	FW	TUR	Hamza Akaydin
70	MF	GHA	Paul Aidoo
76	MF	TUR	Turgut Gönültas
77	GK	TUR	Egemen Gencalp
85	MF	TUR	Necdet Kaba
99	FW	TUR	Emrah Kol
35	FW	TUR	Ejike Collins
