= Araklıspor =

Turkish football club

- Full name: Araklı Spor Kulübü
- Founded: 1961
- Ground: Araklı İlçe Stadium, Trabzon, Turkey
- Capacity: 1,364
- Chairman: Reşat Çebi
- Manager: vacant
- League: Regional Amateur League
Home colours	Away colours

Araklıspor is a professional Turkish football club located in the Araklı district of Trabzon. The club was formed in 1961. The club colours are black and green. Araklıspor play their home matches at Araklı Stadium.
