= Çorumspor =

Turkish football club

- Full name: Çorum Spor Kulübü
- Founded: 1967; 59 years ago
- League: Çorum 1st Amateur League
Home colours	Away colours

Çorumspor was a Turkish football club that played in the Çorum 1st Amateur League. Çorumspor previously played at the 15,000-capacity Dr. Turhan Kılıçcıoğlu Stadium, which has since been demolished. In November 2019, Çorum FK started a 3 years takeover process to take over Çorumspor and merge them to one team.
