= Karsspor =

Turkish football club

- Full name: Karsspor Kulübü
- Nickname(s): Kafkas Kartalları
- Founded: 1995
- Ground: Kars Şehir Stadium, Kars, Turkey
- Capacity: 5,000
- Chairman: Muzaffer Sangu
- Manager: Haluk Seçkin
- League: Regional Amateur League
Home colours	Away colours

Karsspor is a Turkish football club based in the eastern city of Kars and playing in the Regional Amateur League.

The team and its fans are referenced several times in the novel Snow by Orhan Pamuk.
