= Darıca Gençlerbirliği =

Turkish sports club

- Full name: Darıca Gençlerbirliği Spor Kulübü
- Founded: 1934
- Ground: Darıca 15 Temmuz Stadium, Darıca, Kocaeli
- Capacity: 2,610
- Chairman: Halil Akbaşoğlu
- Manager: Ender Alkan
- League: TFF 3. Lig
- 2022–23: TFF 3. Lig, Group 2, 14th
- Website: http://daricagenclerbirligi.com.tr/
Home colours	Away colours

Darıca Gençlerbirliği is a sports club located in Turkey.
