= İskenderun 5 July Stadium =

Multi-purpose stadium in İskenderun, Turkey

Coordinates: 36°35′07″N 36°09′18″E

5 July Stadium
- 5 Temmuz Stadyumu
- Interactive map of 5 July Stadium
- Location: İskenderun, Turkey
- Capacity: 12.390
- Surface: Turf

Construction
- Opened: 1961
- Renovated: 2008
- Demolished: 2022

Tenants
- Körfez İskenderunspor; İskenderunspor 1967

5 July Stadium (Turkish: 5 Temmuz Stadyumu) is a multi-purpose stadium in İskenderun, Turkey. It is currently used mostly for football matches and is the home ground of Turkish teams Körfez İskenderunspor and İskenderunspor 1967. The stadium was built in 1961 and currently holds 12,390 people. With the promotion of Payas Belediyespor to the Turkish TFF Third League at the 2013 season, the stadium became their home ground too. The stadium demolished in 2022.
