= Kırıkhanspor =

- Full name: Kırıkhanspor
- Founded: 1938; 88 years ago
- Dissolved: 2022; 4 years ago
- Ground: Kırıkhan Şehir Stadium, Hatay
- Capacity: 6,500
- League: Turkish Amateur Football League
- Website: https://www.kirikhanspor.com/
| Home colours | Away colours |

Kırıkhanspor is a Turkish football club located in Kırıkhan, Hatay Province.

== League participations ==
- TFF Third League: 1984–1989, 1991–1994, 2009–2018
- Turkish Regional Amateur League: 2018–2019
- Amateur League: –1984, 1989–1991, 1994–2009, 2019–

== League performances ==
| Season | League | Pos | Pld | W | D | L | PF | PA | Pts |
|---|---|---|---|---|---|---|---|---|---|
| 1984–85 | TFF Third League – 8th Group | 7 | 18 | 6 | 5 | 7 | 12 | 16 | 17 |
| 1985–86 | TFF Third League – 3rd Group | 5 | 24 | 9 | 9 | 6 | 28 | 24 | 27 |
| 1986–87 | TFF Third League – 3rd Group | 11 | 32 | 8 | 14 | 10 | 28 | 34 | 30 |
| 1987–88 | TFF Third League – 3rd Group | 9 | 32 | 11 | 9 | 12 | 32 | 37 | 42 |
| 1988–89 | TFF Third League – 3rd Group | 15 | 30 | 7 | 8 | 15 | 28 | 43 | 29 |
| 2009–10 | TFF Third League – 5th Group | 2 | 16 | 8 | 3 | 5 | 24 | 18 | 27 |
| | TFF Third League – Promotion Group | 4 | 18 | 10 | 2 | 6 | 22 | 21 | 32 |
| | TFF Third League – Playoffs | S.F. | 2 | 1 | 0 | 1 | 3 | 3 | 3 |
| 2010–11 | TFF Third League – 3rd Group | 10 | 34 | 13 | 8 | 13 | 41 | 42 | 47 |
| 2011–12 | TFF Third League – 1st Group | 12 | 36 | 13 | 9 | 14 | 47 | 48 | 48 |
| 2012–13 | TFF Third League – 1st Group | 6 | 34 | 15 | 8 | 11 | 46 | 36 | 53 |
| 2013–14 | TFF Third League – 3rd Group | 11 | 34 | 12 | 8 | 14 | 52 | 45 | 44 |
| 2014–15 | TFF Third League – 1st Group | 14 | 34 | 11 | 11 | 12 | 41 | 34 | 44 |
| 2015–16 | TFF Third League – 1st Group | 9 | 35 | 12 | 8 | 15 | 32 | 40 | 44 |
| 2016–17 | TFF Third League | TBD | 0 | 0 | 0 | 0 | 0 | 0 | 0 |

| Promotion |
| Relegation |

Source: TFF: Kırıkhanspor
