= 1946–47 Galatasaray S.K. season =

Galatasaray
1946–47 season
- President: (Turkey) Suphi Batur
- Manager: (Hungary) Josef Szweng
- Stadium: Şeref Stadı
- Istanbul Lig: 4th
- Milli Küme: 3rd
- Istanbul Kupası: Semi final
- Top goalscorer: League: Reha Eken (9); All: Reha Eken (19)
Home colours

The 1946–47 season was Galatasaray SK's 43rd in existence and the club's 35th consecutive season in the Istanbul Football League.

== Squad statistics ==
No.	Pos.	Name	IFL		MKŞ		IFK		Total	
No.	Pos.	Name	Apps	Goals	Apps	Goals	Apps	Goals	Apps	Goals
-	GK	(Turkey) Turgay Şeren	0	0	0	0	n/a	n/a	0	0
-	GK	(Turkey) Osman İncili	11	0	3	0	n/a	n/a	14	0
-	GK	(Turkey) Erdoğan Atlıoğlu	3	0	6	0	n/a	n/a	9	0
-	GK	(Turkey) Necdet Erdem	0	0	5	0	n/a	n/a	5	0
-	DF	(Turkey) Bülent Eken	13	1	12	1	n/a	n/a	25	2
-	DF	(Turkey) İlhan Selçuk İstinyeli	7	0	14	0	n/a	n/a	21	0
-	DF	(Turkey) Fazıl Göknar	12	0	14	0	n/a	n/a	26	0
-	DF	(Turkey) Koçis Kandidis	10	3	14	7	n/a	n/a	24	10
-	DF	(Turkey) Faruk Barlas	2	0	0	0	n/a	n/a	2	0
-	DF	(Turkey) Necmi Erdoğdu	5	1	9	1	n/a	n/a	14	2
-	DF	(Turkey) Salim Şatıroğlu	5	0	1	0	n/a	n/a	6	0
-	DF	(Turkey) İsmet Kalaoğlu	4	0	0	0	n/a	n/a	4	0
-	DF	(Turkey) Hilmi Ecer	0	0	2	0	n/a	n/a	2	0
-	MF	(Turkey) Celal Kibarer	5	0	0	0	n/a	n/a	5	0
-	MF	(Turkey) Arif Sevinç	10	1	0	0	n/a	n/a	10	1
-	MF	(Turkey) Namık Sınmaz	6	1	0	0	n/a	n/a	6	1
-	MF	(Turkey) Emel Yerkıvanç	1	0	0	0	n/a	n/a	1	0
-	MF	(Turkey) Doğan Koloğlu	5	0	5	0	n/a	n/a	10	0
-	MF	(Turkey) Zeki Egeli	6	0	0	0	n/a	n/a	6	0
-	FW	(Turkey) Reha Eken	12	9	12	10	n/a	n/a	24	19
-	FW	(Turkey) Mehmet Ali Gültekin	11	1	14	4	n/a	n/a	25	5
-	FW	(Turkey) Halis Etçi	10	2	14	5	n/a	n/a	24	7
-	FW	(Turkey) Korhan Tugay	5	2	2	0	n/a	n/a	7	2
-	FW	(Turkey) İsfendiyar Açıksöz	4	2	10	3	n/a	n/a	14	5
-	FW	(Turkey) Muzaffer Tokaç	5	0	11	1	n/a	n/a	16	1
-	FW	(Turkey) Bülent	2	0	6	0	n/a	n/a	8	0
-	FW	(Turkey) Gündüz Kılıç	0	0	0	0	n/a	n/a	0	0

== Squad changes for the 1946–1947 season ==
In:

== Competitions ==
=== Istanbul Football League ===
==== Classification ====
Pos	Team	Pld	W	D	L	GF	GA	GD	Pts
1	Fenerbahçe SK	14	9	3	2	33	14	+19	35
2	Vefa SK	14	10	1	3	36	18	+18	35
3	Beşiktaş JK	14	9	2	3	38	14	+24	34
4	Galatasaray SK	14	5	6	3	23	22	+1	30
5	Küçükçekmece SK	14	5	5	4	25	26	−1	29
6	Beykoz 1908 S.K.D.	14	3	4	7	13	22	−9	24
7	Kasımpaşa SK	14	1	5	8	22	23	−1	21
8	Beyoğlu SK	14	0	2	12	12	53	−41	16

==== Matches ====
Kick-off listed in local time (EEST)

20 September 1946 1	Galatasaray SK	2–0	Kasımpaşa SK	Istanbul
16:00	İsfendiyar Açıksöz 5'; Reha Eken 10'	(Report)		Stadium: Ali Sami Yen Stadı; Referee: Şekip Akduman

6 October 1946 2	Küçükçekmece SK	0–0	Galatasaray SK	Istanbul
15:00		(Report)		Stadium: Ali Sami Yen Stadı; Referee: Nihat Dorken

13 October 1946 3	Galatasaray SK	1–0	Beykoz 1908 S.K.D.	Istanbul
15:00	Reha Eken 53'	(Report)		Stadium: Ali Sami Yen Stadı; Referee: Şekip Akduman

20 October 1946 4	Fenerbahçe SK	2–2	Galatasaray SK	Istanbul
15:00	Fikret Kırcan 5'; Melih Kotanca 25'	(Report)	Reha Eken 6'; Halis Etçi 29'	Stadium: Fenerbahçe Stadı; Referee: Nihat Dorken

3 November 1946 5	Beyoğlu SK	0–2	Galatasaray SK	Istanbul
15:00		(Report)	Reha Eken 22', 70'	Stadium: Ali Sami Yen Stadı; Referee: Selami Akal

17 November 1946 6	Galatasaray SK	1–1	Beşiktaş JK	Istanbul
14:30	Reha Eken 54'	(Report)	Şeref Görkey 70'	Stadium: Şeref Stadı; Referee: Mehmet Reşat Nayır

24 November 1946 7	Galatasaray SK	2–2	Vefa SK	Istanbul
14:30	Zeki Egeli 54'; Bülent Eken 83'	(Report)	Hüseyin Saygun 52'; Haydar Taşdemir 75'	Stadium: Ali Sami Yen Stadı; Referee: Ziya Ozan

15 December 1946 8	Kasımpaşa SK	2–2	Galatasaray SK	Istanbul
14:30	Recep Öngör 7'; Hidayet Volga 65'	(Report)	Reha Eken 36', 84'	Stadium: Ali Sami Yen Stadı; Referee: Feridun Kılıç

29 December 1946 9	Galatasaray SK	3–3	Küçükçekmece SK	Istanbul
14:30	Koçis Kandidis 37'; Necmi Erdoğdu 44'; Arif Sevinç 72'	(Report)	İsmail Öksüzler 48', 55', 65'	Stadium: Ali Sami Yen Stadı; Referee: Şekip Akduman

9 February 1947 10	Beşiktaş JK	4–0	Galatasaray SK	Istanbul
14:30	Hakkı Yeten 2'; Faruk Sağnak 21'; Kemal Gülçelik 24'; Şükrü Gülesin 73'	(Report)		Stadium: Şeref Stadı; Referee: Feridun Kılıç

2 March 1947 11	Galatasaray SK	1–0	Fenerbahçe SK	Istanbul
15:00	Korhan Tugay 21'	(Report)		Stadium: Fenerbahçe Stadı; Referee: Sıtkı Eryar

9 March 1947 12	Galatasaray SK	4–0	Beyoğlu SK	Istanbul
15:30	Reha Eken 60'; Koçis Kandidis 71'; Mehmet Ali Gültekin 78'; Halis Etçi 87'	(Report)		Stadium: Ali Sami Yen Stadı; Referee: Selami Akal

16 March 1947 13	Vefa SK	4–2	Galatasaray SK	Istanbul
15:30	Muammer Deniz 21'; Hüseyin Saygun 25', 57'; İsmet Artun 76'	(Report)	Koçis Kandidis 1'; Korhan Tugay 52'	Stadium: Vefa Stadı; Referee: Semih Arıcan

19 March 1947 14	Beykoz 1908 S.K.D.	4–1	Galatasaray SK	Istanbul
16:00	Necdet Şenocak 39'; Bedri Merkez 43'; Bülent Varol 46', 71'	(Report)	İsfendiyar Açıksöz 4'	Stadium: Şeref Stadı; Referee: Mehmet Reşat Nayır

=== Milli Küme ===
==== Classification ====
Pos	Team	Pld	W	D	L	GF	GA	GAv	Pts
1	Beşiktaş	14	10	3	1	39	12	3.250	37
2	Fenerbahçe	14	9	3	2	41	21	1.952	35
3	Galatasaray	14	6	5	3	32	20	1.600	31
4	Vefa	14	6	4	4	29	23	1.261	30
5	Ankara Demirspor	14	6	3	5	28	25	1.120	29
6	Gençlerbirliği	14	2	5	7	19	32	0.594	23
7	Altınordu	14	2	2	10	18	38	0.474	20
8	Altay	14	2	1	11	18	53	0.340	19

Rules for classification: 3 points for a win, 2 points for a draw, and 1 points for a loss.

==== Matches ====
11 March 1947 1	Galatasaray SK	1–2	Fenerbahçe SK	Istanbul
15:30	Halis Etçi 65'	(Report)	Halil Özyazıcı 35'; Malik Cin 70'	Stadium: Şeref Stadı; Referee: Adnan Akın

29 March 1947 2	Altınordu S.K.	3–7	Galatasaray SK	İzmir
16:00	Memduh Gezer 5'; Sait Altınordu 22', 66'	(Report)	Necmi Erdoğdu 10'; Koçis Kandidis 15'; İsfendiyar Açıksöz 27', 59'; Halis Etçi 37', 75'; Reha Eken 86'	Stadium: Alsancak Stadı; Referee: Ömer Tanyeri

30 March 1947 3	Altay S.K.	1–2	Galatasaray SK	İzmir
14:00	İlyas 4'	(Report)	Koçis Kandidis 20', 36'	Stadium: Alsancak Stadı; Referee: Ömer Tanyeri

6 April 1947 4	Beşiktaş JK	1–1	Galatasaray SK	Istanbul
16:00	Yavuz Üreten 86' (pen.)	(Report)	Koçis Kandidis 34'	Stadium: Şeref Stadı; Referee: Samih Duransoy

12 April 1947 5	Galatasaray SK	2–1	Ankara Demirspor	Istanbul
14:30	Reha Eken 36', 71'	(Report)	Gündüz Kılıç 34'	Stadium: Şeref Stadı; Referee: Zülbahar Sağnak

13 April 1947 6	Galatasaray SK	3–1	Gençlerbirliği SK	Istanbul
14:30	Reha Eken 6'; Koçis Kandidis 21'; Mehmet Ali Gültekin 70'	(Report)	Erdal 48'	Stadium: Şeref Stadı; Referee: Sabri Armağan

19 April 1947 7	Galatasaray SK	2–2	Vefa SK	Istanbul
16:00	Reha Eken 16', 25'	(Report)	Hüseyin Saygun 41'; İsmet Artun 67'	Stadium: Şeref Stadı; Referee: Feridun Kılıç

26 April 1947 8	Galatasaray SK	6–0	Altay SK	Istanbul
15:15	Muzaffer Tokaç 2'; Mehmet Ali Gültekin 26', 75'; Halis Etçi 62'; Reha Eken 67', 87'	(Report)		Stadium: Şeref Stadı; Referee: Ziya Ozan

27 April 1947 9	Galatasaray SK	2–0	Altınordu S.K.	Istanbul
15:00	Koçis Kandidis 5'; Mehmet Ali Gültekin 13'	(Report)		Stadium: Fenerbahçe Stadı; Referee: Nuri Songar

4 May 1947 10	Fenerbahçe SK	2–1	Galatasaray SK	Istanbul
17:00	Selahattin Torkal 14'; Suphi Ural 65'	(Report)	Bülent Eken 72'	Stadium: Fenerbahçe Stadı; Referee: Sulhi Garan

10 May 1947 11	Gençlerbirliği SK	0–0	Galatasaray SK	Ankara
15:30		(Report)		Stadium: Ankara 19 Mayıs Stadium; Referee: Adnan Akın

11 May 1947 12	Ankara Demirspor	3–3	Galatasaray SK	Ankara
17:30	Hamdi Dağaşar 9'; Kadri Ulukal 34', 85'	(Report)	İsfendiyar Açıksöz 12'; Reha Eken 48', 60'	Stadium: Ankara 19 Mayıs Stadium; Referee: Fethi Karaturgay

17 May 1947 13	Vefa SK	1–1	Galatasaray SK	Istanbul
17:30	İsmet Artun 49'	(Report)	Koçis Kandidis 13'	Stadium: Şeref Stadı; Referee: Mehmet Reşat Nayır

25 May 1947 14	Galatasaray SK	1–3	Beşiktaş JK	Istanbul
18:00	Halis Etçi 48'	(Report)	Şevket Yorulmaz 28'; Hakkı Yeten 50'; Süreyya Görkey 60'	Stadium: Fenerbahçe Stadı; Referee: Sıtkı Eryar

=== Istanbul Futbol Kupası ===
==== Matches ====
22 December 1946 1/2 Final	Galatasaray SK	1–3	Fenerbahçe SK	Istanbul
	?	(Report)	?
