= List of Turkey international footballers (5–19 caps) =

This is a list of Turkey international footballers – football players who have played for the Turkey national football team.

This list contains all players with between 5 and 19 appearances for the national team. For a list of players with 20 or more caps, see List of Turkey international footballers, other players are listed at List of Turkey international footballers (1–4 caps).

== Key to positions ==
| GK | Goalkeeper |
| DF | Defender |
| MF | Midfielder |
| FW | Forward |
| Bold | Still playing competitive football |

== List of players ==
As of 15 November 2026

| Rank | Name | Position | Years | Caps | Goals | Ref. |
|---|---|---|---|---|---|---|
| 147 | Saffet Sancaklı | FW | 1992–1996 | 19 | 6 | |
| 148 | Necati Ateş | FW | 2003–2006 | 19 | 5 | |
| 149 | Ayhan Elmastaşoğlu | FW | 1965–1969 | 19 | 4 | |
| 150 | Mehmet Oğuz | MF | 1969–1975 | 19 | 3 | |
| 151 | Uğur Tütüneker | MF | 1986–1992 | 19 | 1 | |
| 152 | Ömer Çatkıç | GK | 2000–2005 | 19 | 0 | |
| 153 | Müjdat Yetkiner | DF | 1984–1987 | 19 | 0 | |
| 154 | Şener Özbayraklı | DF | 2015–2018 | 19 | 0 | |
| 155 | **Samet Akaydin** | DF | 2022– | 19 | 1 | |
| 156 | Mustafa Yürür | MF | 1960–1968 | 18 | 6 | |
| 157 | Fevzi Zemzem | FW | 1965–1969 | 18 | 6 | |
| 158 | Hasan Şengün | FW | 1982–1985 | 18 | 2 | |
| 159 | Tolga Seyhan | DF | 2004–2006 | 18 | 2 | |
| 160 | Serdar Aziz | DF | 2014–2021 | 18 | 2 | |
| 161 | Nevzat Güzelırmak | MF | 1962–1968 | 18 | 1 | |
| 162 | Mehmet Ali Has | FW | 1950–1957 | 18 | 0 | |
| 163 | Hayrettin Demirbaş | GK | 1991–1994 | 18 | 0 | |
| 164 | Yılmaz Şen | DF | 1965–1969 | 18 | 0 | |
| 165 | Fehmi Sağınoğlu | DF | 1965–1968 | 18 | 0 | |
| 166 | Oktay Derelioğlu | FW | 1995–2001 | 18 | 9 | |
| 167 | İlyas Tüfekçi | FW | 1981–1987 | 18 | 6 | |
| 168 | **Oğuz Aydın** | DF | 2024– | 18 | 0 | |
| 169 | Cüneyt Tanman | DF | 1977–1989 | 17 | 0 | |
| 170 | Mehmet Topuz | MF | 2006–2011 | 17 | 0 | |
| 171 | **Halil Dervişoğlu** | FW | 2021– | 16 | 6 | |
| 172 | Mehmet Leblebi | MF | 1924–1932 | 16 | 3 | |
| 173 | Serhat Akın | FW | 2002–2005 | 16 | 3 | |
| 174 | İsfendiyar Açıksöz | MF | 1948–1957 | 16 | 2 | |
| 175 | Erol Keskin | FW | 1948–1954 | 16 | 2 | |
| 176 | Alaattin Baydar | MF | 1948–1954 | 16 | 1 | |
| 177 | İsmail Kurt | DF | 1958–1965 | 16 | 0 | |
| 178 | Naci Özkaya | DF | 1948–1952 | 16 | 0 | |
| 179 | Alper Potuk | MF | 2012–2018 | 16 | 0 | |
| 180 | Zeki Rıza Sporel | FW | 1923–1932 | 16 | 15 | |
| 181 | **Deniz Gül** | FW | 2025– | 16 | 2 | |
| 182 | Suat Kaya | MF | 1993–2000 | 15 | 1 | |
| 183 | **Emre Mor** | MF | 2016– | 15 | 1 | |
| 184 | Şükrü Birant | DF | 1964–1969 | 15 | 0 | |
| 185 | Şenol Çorlu | FW | 1981–1986 | 15 | 0 | |
| 186 | Yasin Özdenak | GK | 1971–1975 | 15 | 0 | |
| 187 | **Umut Meraş** | DF | 2019– | 15 | 0 | |
| 188 | Gökhan Ünal | FW | 2006–2009 | 15 | 4 | |
| 189 | **Altay Bayındır** | GK | 2021– | 14 | 0 | |
| 190 | Ergün Acuner | MF | 1977–1984 | 14 | 3 | |
| 191 | Ender Konca | FW | 1968–1973 | 14 | 3 | |
| 192 | İsa Ertürk | MF | 1976–1981 | 14 | 1 | |
| 193 | Faruk Karadoğan | FW | 1966–1969 | 14 | 1 | |
| 194 | Kamuran Yavuz | MF | 1968–1971 | 14 | 1 | |
| 195 | **Dorukhan Toköz** | MF | 2019– | 14 | 1 | |
| 196 | Necdet Ergün | FW | 1977–1984 | 14 | 0 | |
| 197 | Erol Togay | DF | 1976–1980 | 14 | 0 | |
| 198 | Hasan Vezir | FW | 1968–1971 | 14 | 0 | |
| 199 | **Abdülkadir Ömür** | MF | 2019– | 14 | 0 | |
| 200 | Osman Arpacıoğlu | FW | 1968–1974 | 13 | 3 | |
| 201 | Bülent Eken | DF | 1948–1953 | 13 | 2 | |
| 202 | İskender Günen | MF | 1980–1987 | 13 | 1 | |
| 203 | Hilmi Kiremitçi | FW | 1957–1961 | 13 | 1 | |
| 204 | Osman Özköylü | DF | 1995–2000 | 13 | 1 | |
| 205 | Hüseyin Saygun | FW | 1948–1951 | 13 | 1 | |
| 206 | Muzaffer Tokaç | FW | 1948–1952 | 13 | 1 | |
| 207 | Onur Kıvrak | GK | 2010–2017 | 13 | 0 | |
| 208 | Bedri Gürsoy | FW | 1923–1928 | 12 | 2 | |
| 209 | **Deniz Türüç** | MF | 2017– | 12 | 2 | |
| 210 | Erhan Önal | DF | 1979–1987 | 12 | 1 | |
| 211 | Mustafa Pektemek | FW | 2012–2014 | 12 | 1 | |
| 212 | Uğur Boral | MF | 2006–2008 | 12 | 1 | |
| 213 | Aykut Kocaman | FW | 1992–1995 | 12 | 1 | |
| 214 | Cihat Arman | GK | 1936–1949 | 12 | 0 | |
| 215 | Mehmet Ekici | MF | 2010–2015 | 12 | 0 | |
| 216 | Sabri Dino | GK | 1969–1975 | 12 | 0 | |
| 217 | Fatih Uraz | GK | 1985–1988 | 12 | 0 | |
| 218 | Sercan Sararer | MF | 2012–2013 | 12 | 0 | |
| 219 | Uğur Köken | FW | 1962–1966 | 12 | 0 | |
| 220 | **Sinan Bolat** | GK | 2009– | 12 | 0 | |
| 221 | **Can Uzun** | MF | 2024– | 12 | 1 | |
| 222 | Köksal Mesci | FW | 1972–1974 | 11 | 1 | |
| 223 | Candemir Berkman | DF | 1961–1964 | 11 | 0 | |
| 224 | Bülent Uygun | FW | 1993–1996 | 11 | 0 | |
| 225 | Savaş Demiral | MF | 1986–1990 | 11 | 0 | |
| 226 | Yaşar Duran | GK | 1980–1985 | 11 | 0 | |
| 227 | Abdülkerim Durmaz | DF | 1984–1986 | 11 | 0 | |
| 228 | Ali İhsan Karayiğit | FW | 1951–1954 | 11 | 0 | |
| 229 | İsmet Uluğ | DF | 1923–1928 | 11 | 0 | |
| 230 | Volkan Arslan | MF | 2003–2006 | 11 | 0 | |
| 231 | Özer Yurteri | DF | 1971–1973 | 11 | 0 | |
| 232 | Gündüz Kılıç | FW | 1936–1951 | 11 | 5 | |
| 233 | Şükrü Gülesin | FW | 1948–1951 | 11 | 4 | |
| 234 | Mustafa Denizli | FW | 1977–1980 | 10 | 2 | |
| 235 | Recep Adanır | FW | 1951–1962 | 10 | 2 | |
| 236 | Sercan Yıldırım | FW | 2009–2010 | 10 | 2 | |
| 237 | Tuncay Soyak | FW | 1980–1984 | 10 | 2 | |
| 238 | Olcan Adın | MF | 2012–2014 | 10 | 1 | |
| 239 | Burhan Atak | DF | 1926–1932 | 10 | 1 | |
| 240 | Tarık Kutver | FW | 1961–1964 | 10 | 1 | |
| 241 | Mehmet Özgül | MF | 1973–1977 | 10 | 1 | |
| 242 | Birol Pekel | FW | 1960–1964 | 10 | 1 | |
| 243 | Özcan Arkoç | GK | 1958–1965 | 10 | 0 | |
| 244 | Hüseyin Çakıroğlu | MF | 1983–1986 | 10 | 0 | |
| 245 | Kadri Göktulga | DF | 1924–1928 | 10 | 0 | |
| 246 | İlker Yağcıoğlu | DF | 1994–1997 | 10 | 0 | |
| 247 | Kemal Serdar | DF | 1984–1991 | 10 | 0 | |
| 248 | Tuncay Temeller | DF | 1972–1975 | 10 | 0 | |
| 249 | **Ömer Bayram** | DF | 2018– | 10 | 0 | |
| 250 | **Serdar Dursun** | FW | 2021– | 10 | 7 | |
| 251 | Ümit Karan | FW | 1999–2007 | 10 | 3 | |
| 252 | Aydın Yelken | FW | 1961–1965 | 9 | 3 | |
| 253 | Nedim Doğan | FW | 1963–1967 | 9 | 1 | |
| 254 | Gökmen Özdenak | FW | 1972–1977 | 9 | 1 | |
| 255 | Volkan Yayın | MF | 1977–1981 | 9 | 1 | |
| 256 | Rober Eryol | MF | 1951–1954 | 9 | 0 | |
| 257 | Ali Gençay | DF | 1924–1925 | 9 | 0 | |
| 258 | Kemal Rıfat Kalpakçıoğlu | DF | 1924–1927 | 9 | 0 | |
| 259 | Rasim Kara | GK | 1975–1978 | 9 | 0 | |
| 260 | Sabahattin Kuruoğlu | MF | 1961–1965 | 9 | 0 | |
| 261 | Mustafa İzzet | MF | 2000–2004 | 9 | 0 | |
| 262 | Mutlu Topçu | DF | 1994–1995 | 9 | 0 | |
| 263 | Muhammed Altıntaş | MF | 1987–1991 | 9 | 0 | |
| 264 | Süreyya Özkefe | MF | 1961–1965 | 9 | 0 | |
| 265 | Selahattin Torkal | DF | 1948–1952 | 9 | 0 | |
| 266 | Bülent Ünder | MF | 1973–1974 | 9 | 0 | |
| 267 | Mustafa Yücedağ | MF | 1988–1990 | 9 | 0 | |
| 268 | Egemen Korkmaz | DF | 2011–2013 | 9 | 0 | |
| 269 | Tolga Zengin | GK | 2006–2014 | 9 | 0 | |
| 270 | Tunay Torun | MF | 2011–2012 | 9 | 0 | |
| 271 | **Taylan Antalyalı** | MF | 2021– | 9 | 0 | |
| 272 | **Cenk Özkaçar** | DF | 2022– | 9 | 0 | |
| 273 | Sabih Arca | MF | 1923–1926 | 9 | 3 | |
| 274 | Şenol Birol | FW | 1960–1963 | 8 | 3 | |
| 275 | Fikret Arıcan | FW | 1931–1937 | 8 | 2 | |
| 276 | Fikret Kırcan | FW | 1948–1955 | 8 | 2 | |
| 277 | Halil İbrahim Eren | FW | 1980–1984 | 8 | 1 | |
| 278 | Faruk Yiğit | FW | 1991–1996 | 8 | 1 | |
| 279 | Önder Mustafaoğlu | MF | 1977–1979 | 8 | 1 | |
| 280 | Muslihittin Peykoğlu | FW | 1924–1928 | 8 | 1 | |
| 281 | Saffet Akyüz | FW | 1995–1998 | 8 | 1 | |
| 282 | Mesut Şen | FW | 1968–1972 | 8 | 1 | |
| 283 | Ahmet Yılmaz Çalık | DF | 2015–2017 | 8 | 1 | |
| 284 | **Efecan Karaca** | MF | 2019– | 8 | 1 | |
| 285 | **Serdar Gürler** | MF | 2017– | 8 | 1 | |
| 286 | Serdar Bali | MF | 1978–1980 | 8 | 0 | |
| 287 | Kemal Batmaz | DF | 1975–1977 | 8 | 0 | |
| 288 | Can Arat | DF | 2006 | 8 | 0 | |
| 289 | Şükrü Ersoy | GK | 1950–1957 | 8 | 0 | |
| 290 | Mithat Ertuğ | MF | 1924–1932 | 8 | 0 | |
| 291 | Eser Özaltındere | GK | 1977–1983 | 8 | 0 | |
| 292 | Hüsnü Özkara | DF | 1980–1982 | 8 | 0 | |
| 293 | Eşref Özmenç | MF | 1951–1954 | 8 | 0 | |
| 294 | Arif Peçenek | GK | 1984–1985 | 8 | 0 | |
| 295 | Hüsnü Savman | DF | 1928–1937 | 8 | 0 | |
| 296 | Vedii Tosuncuk | DF | 1948–1952 | 8 | 0 | |
| 297 | Müzdat Yetkiner | DF | 1950–1954 | 8 | 0 | |
| 298 | **Berkan Kutlu** | MF | 2021– | 8 | 0 | |
| 299 | Burhan Sargın | FW | 1953–1954 | 8 | 7 | |
| 300 | Okan Yılmaz | FW | 2003 | 8 | 5 | |
| 301 | Hasan Kabze | FW | 2006 | 7 | 2 | |
| 302 | Metin Yıldız | MF | 1980–1988 | 7 | 2 | |
| 303 | Bilal Kısa | DF | 2006–2014 | 7 | 1 | |
| 304 | Ali Çoban | DF | 1978–1987 | 7 | 1 | |
| 305 | Arif Kocabıyık | MF | 1982–1985 | 7 | 1 | |
| 306 | Nihat Akbay | GK | 1965–1976 | 7 | 0 | |
| 307 | Mehmet Aktan | DF | 1973 | 7 | 0 | |
| 308 | Ali Günçar | DF | 1992–1997 | 7 | 0 | |
| 309 | Cafer Çağatay | DF | 1923–1927 | 7 | 0 | |
| 310 | Celil Sağır | MF | 1996–1997 | 7 | 0 | |
| 311 | Sabahattin Erboğa | DF | 1975–1980 | 7 | 0 | |
| 312 | Ali Gültiken | FW | 1987–1991 | 7 | 0 | |
| 313 | İbrahim Kaş | DF | 2007–2009 | 7 | 0 | |
| 314 | Hakan Kutucuoğlu | MF | 1982–1983 | 7 | 0 | |
| 315 | Turhan Sofuoğlu | FW | 1989–1992 | 7 | 0 | |
| 316 | Ersan Gülüm | DF | 2013–2015 | 7 | 0 | |
| 317 | Eren Talu | DF | 1982–1983 | 7 | 0 | |
| 318 | Ali Yavaş | DF | 1975–1976 | 7 | 0 | |
| 319 | Gökhan Gedikali | DF | 1987–1990 | 7 | 0 | |
| 320 | **Berkay Özcan** | MF | 2018– | 7 | 0 | |
| 321 | **Rıdvan Yılmaz** | DF | 2021– | 7 | 0 | |
| 322 | **Emre Akbaba** | MF | 2017– | 7 | 3 | |
| 323 | **Doğukan Sinik** | DF | 2022– | 6 | 2 | |
| 324 | Onur Kayador | DF | 1980–1984 | 6 | 1 | |
| 325 | Koray Avcı | MF | 2004–2005 | 6 | 1 | |
| 326 | Mehmet Türkkan | FW | 1973–1975 | 6 | 1 | |
| 327 | Muharrem Gürbüz | DF | 1980–1984 | 6 | 1 | |
| 328 | Hamit Akbay | GK | 1924–1925 | 6 | 0 | |
| 329 | Ali Eren Beşerler | DF | 1999 | 6 | 0 | |
| 330 | Serdar Kesimal | DF | 2010–2011 | 6 | 0 | |
| 331 | Ali Beratlıgil | FW | 1956–1957 | 6 | 0 | |
| 332 | Rıdvan Bolatlı | DF | 1953–1954 | 6 | 0 | |
| 333 | Ceyhun Gülselam | MF | 2008–2010 | 6 | 0 | |
| 334 | Mehmet Ekşi | DF | 1978–1981 | 6 | 0 | |
| 335 | Fahri Tatan | MF | 2006 | 6 | 0 | |
| 336 | Fatih Sonkaya | DF | 2003–2004 | 6 | 0 | |
| 337 | Tuna Güneysu | FW | 1979–1982 | 6 | 0 | |
| 338 | İsmail Kartal | DF | 1982–1985 | 6 | 0 | |
| 339 | Yaşar Mumcuoğlu | FW | 1965–1970 | 6 | 0 | |
| 340 | Saffet Akbaş | DF | 1996–1999 | 6 | 0 | |
| 341 | Güngör Şahinkaya | MF | 1980–1984 | 6 | 0 | |
| 342 | Saim Tayşengil | DF | 1955–1958 | 6 | 0 | |
| 343 | Yusuf Tunaoğlu | FW | 1973–1975 | 6 | 0 | |
| 344 | Nusret Ülük | MF | 1952–1956 | 6 | 0 | |
| 345 | Vedat İnceefe | DF | 1996–1997 | 6 | 0 | |
| 346 | Ulvi Yenal | GK | 1926–1928 | 6 | 0 | |
| 347 | Hasan Özer | FW | 2001 | 6 | 0 | |
| 348 | Yusuf Şimşek | MF | 2007–2009 | 6 | 0 | |
| 349 | Serdar Kurtuluş | DF | 2007–2013 | 6 | 0 | |
| 350 | Yasin Öztekin | MF | 2015–2016 | 6 | 0 | |
| 351 | **Nazım Sangaré** | DF | 2019– | 6 | 0 | |
| 352 | **Yusuf Sarı** | MF | 2023– | 6 | 1 | |
| 353 | Nihat Yayöz | MF | 1969–1971 | 6 | 2 | |
| 354 | **Bertuğ Yıldırım** | FW | 2023– | 5 | 2 | |
| 355 | **Umut Nayir** | FW | 2023– | 5 | 1 | |
| 356 | Zafer Bilgetay | DF | 1980–1981 | 5 | 1 | |
| 357 | Rebii Erkal | FW | 1931–1937 | 5 | 1 | |
| 358 | Kemalettin Şentürk | MF | 1995–1996 | 5 | 1 | |
| 359 | Rahim Zafer | DF | 1995–1996 | 5 | 1 | |
| 360 | Niko Kovi | DF | 1974–1977 | 5 | 1 | |
| 361 | Niyazi Sel | FW | 1931–1937 | 5 | 1 | |
| 362 | Zafer Biryol | FW | 2004 | 5 | 1 | |
| 363 | Ahmet İlhan Özek | MF | 2013–2014 | 5 | 1 | |
| 364 | Kerim Frei | MF | 2012–2016 | 5 | 0 | |
| 365 | Hamit Arslan | DF | 1924–1925 | 5 | 0 | |
| 366 | Abdullah Çevrim | FW | 1962–1968 | 5 | 0 | |
| 367 | Ahmet Börtücene | DF | 1972–1974 | 5 | 0 | |
| 368 | Feridun Buğeker | FW | 1952–1955 | 5 | 0 | |
| 369 | Turan Doğangün | MF | 1966–1969 | 5 | 0 | |
| 370 | Ahmet Erol | DF | 1948–1949 | 5 | 0 | |
| 371 | Yılmaz Gökdel | MF | 1964–1965 | 5 | 0 | |
| 372 | Ekrem Günalp | DF | 1971–1974 | 5 | 0 | |
| 373 | Galip Haktanır | MF | 1948–1950 | 5 | 0 | |
| 374 | Mehmet Işıkal | DF | 1969–1971 | 5 | 0 | |
| 375 | Nedim Kaleci | GK | 1923–1925 | 5 | 0 | |
| 376 | Mert Korkmaz | DF | 1998–1999 | 5 | 0 | |
| 377 | Necmi Mutlu | GK | 1961–1964 | 5 | 0 | |
| 378 | Mehmet Reşat Nayır | MF | 1936–1937 | 5 | 0 | |
| 379 | Coşkun Özarı | DF | 1955–1958 | 5 | 0 | |
| 380 | Kadir Özcan | DF | 1975–1976 | 5 | 0 | |
| 381 | Şanver Göymen | GK | 1994–1996 | 5 | 0 | |
| 382 | Selim Özer | DF | 1997–1998 | 5 | 0 | |
| 383 | Cevat Seyit | MF | 1927–1932 | 5 | 0 | |
| 384 | İsmet Yamanoğlu | FW | 1951–1953 | 5 | 0 | |
| 385 | Bahtiyar Yorulmaz | FW | 1979–1981 | 5 | 0 | |
| 386 | Zafer Özgültekin | GK | 2002–2003 | 5 | 0 | |
| 387 | Çetin Zeybek | MF | 1954 | 5 | 0 | |
| 388 | Hasan Okan Gültang | GK | 1995 | 5 | 0 | |
| 389 | Bekir İrtegün | DF | 2012–2014 | 5 | 0 | |
| 390 | **Emre Taşdemir** | DF | 2015– | 5 | 0 | |
| 391 | Fahrettin Cansever | MF | 1949–1954 | 5 | 3 | |
| 392 | Garbis İstanbulluoğlu | FW | 1952–1953 | 5 | 3 | |
| 393 | Halit Deringör | FW | 1948–1950 | 5 | 2 | |
