= List of Turkey international footballers (1–4 caps) =

This is a list of Turkey international footballers – football players who have played for the Turkey national football team.

This list contains all players with between 1 and 4 appearances for the national team. For a list of players with 20 or more caps, see List of Turkey international footballers, other players are listed at List of Turkey international footballers (5–19 caps).

== Key to positions ==
GK	Goalkeeper
DF	Defender
MF	Midfielder
FW	Forward
Bold	Still playing competitive football

== List of players ==
As of 15 November 2026

Rank	Name	Position	Years	Caps	Goals	Ref.
394	Selahattin Almay	FW	1931–1932	4	3	
395	Bülent Aziz Esel	FW	1949–1950	4	3	
396	Reşit Kaynak	FW	1976–1979	4	1	
397	Reha Eken	FW	1948–1950	4	6	
398	Mehmet Nazif Gerçin	DF	1924–1926	4	0	
399	Sadullah Acele	FW	1979–1980	4	0	
400	Sami Açıköney	FW	1925–1931	4	0	
401	Ahmet Yıldırım	MF	2003	4	0	
402	İshak Doğan	MF	2013–2014	4	0	
403	Sait Altınordu	FW	1932–1937	4	0	
404	Murat Alyüz	DF	1948	4	0	
405	Ayhan Aşut	MF	1969	4	0	
406	Muzaffer Badalıoğlu	DF	1981–1983	4	0	
407	Çağlayan Derebaşı	DF	1962–1969	4	0	
408	Emre Güngör	DF	2008–2010	4	1	
409	Erkan Avseren	DF	1995–1996	4	0	
410	Okan Gedikali	GK	1985–1988	4	0	
411	Osman Göktan	MF	1961	4	0	
412	Zafer Göncüler	DF	1973–1975	4	0	
413	Hakan Arıkan	GK	2007	4	0	
414	İbrahim Akın	MF	2006	4	0	
415	Raşit Karasu	MF	1974–1975	4	0	
416	Kaya Köstepen	FW	1958–1963	4	0	
417	Mehmet Polat	DF	2000–2002	4	0	
418	Mehmet Yıldız	FW	2007–2009	4	0	
419	Murat Hacıoğlu	FW	2004	4	0	
420	Mustafa Özer	MF	1995	4	0	
421	Nuri Hüseyin Tok	FW	1975–1977	4	0	
422	Önder Turacı	DF	2004–2009	4	0	
423	Şevki Şenlen	FW	1972–1978	4	0	
424	Serhat Güller	MF	1992–1993	4	0	
425	Alper Timur	MF	1984	4	0	
426	Onursal Uraz	MF	1965–1966	4	0	
427	Varol Ürkmez	GK	1958–1965	4	0	
428	Yılmaz Urul	GK	1964–1965	4	0	
429	Volkan Yaman	DF	2006–2007	4	0	
430	Vural Korkmaz	MF	1995–1997	4	0	
431	İsmet Yurtsu	MF	1961–1963	4	0	
432	Çağlar Birinci	DF	2008–2010	4	0	
433	Engin Baytar	MF	2010–2012	4	0	
434	Adem Büyük	FW	2013–2014	4	0	
435	Emre Çolak	MF	2012–2017	4	0	
436	Serkan Kırıntılı	GK	2018	4	0	
437	**Emre Kılınç**	MF	2019–	4	0	
438	**Tolga Ciğerci**	MF	2016–	4	0	
439	**Onur Bulut**	DF	2022–	4	0	
440	**Berat Özdemir**	MF	2021–	4	0	
441	**Semih Kılıçsoy**	FW	2024–	4	0	
442	Melih Atacan	MF	1973–1974	4	3	
443	**Demir Ege Tıknaz**	MF	2025–	4	0	
444	Bekir Refet	FW	1924–1928	3	3	
445	Latif Yalınlı	FW	1927–1928	3	3	
446	Kemal Faruki	FW	1927–1928	3	2	
447	Ceyhun Güray	DF	1981–1984	3	1	
448	Cihan Haspolatlı	DF	2002–2003	3	1	
449	Kayhan Kaynak	FW	1987	3	1	
450	Gürsel Aksel	FW	1965–1968	3	1	
451	Sinan Alayoğlu	FW	1962–1965	3	1	
452	Hakkı Yeten	FW	1931–1936	3	1	
453	Ozan İpek	MF	2010–2011	3	0	
454	Ahmet Dursun	FW	2000	3	0	
455	Tuncay Becedek	MF	1962–1965	3	0	
456	Bilal Yılmaz	DF	1982–1983	3	0	
457	Nazmi Bilge	FW	1955	3	0	
458	Hüsamettin Böke	GK	1926–1932	3	0	
459	Hayri Ragıp Candemir	MF	1924–1926	3	0	
460	Sadi Çoban	MF	1924–1927	3	0	
461	Fikret Demirer	FW	1984	3	0	
462	Osman Denizci	MF	1980–1982	3	0	
463	Ayfer Elmastaşoğlu	FW	1966–1973	3	0	
464	Ergun Ercins	MF	1957–1960	3	0	
465	Eren Güngör	DF	2008–2009	3	0	
466	Ersen Martin	FW	2004–2006	3	0	
467	Ergin Gürses	FW	1965–1966	3	0	
468	Ayhan Hançer	DF	1955–1957	3	0	
469	Fethi Heper	FW	1968–1971	3	0	
470	Adem İbrahimoğlu	GK	1983	3	0	
471	Ahmet Karlıklı	DF	1958–1962	3	0	
472	Öner Kılıç	FW	1977–1980	3	0	
473	Savaş Koç	MF	1988	3	0	
474	Avni Kurgan	GK	1931–1932	3	0	
475	Metin Aktaş	GK	2000–2002	3	0	
476	Murat Ocak	DF	2006	3	0	
477	Zafer Öğer	GK	1984	3	0	
478	Ali İhsan Okçuoğlu	MF	1964	3	0	
479	Vedat Okyar	DF	1969–1971	3	0	
480	Ömer Erdoğan	DF	2010	3	0	
481	Orhan Ak	DF	2004–2006	3	0	
482	Necmi Perekli	FW	1976–1977	3	0	
483	Ramazan Tunç	DF	1997–2001	3	0	
484	Fuat Saner	MF	1972–1973	3	0	
485	Serdar Özkan	MF	2007–2008	3	0	
486	Musa Sezer	MF	1948–1949	3	0	
487	Coşkun Taş	FW	1954	3	0	
488	Hakan Tecimer	MF	1989–1990	3	0	
489	Güngör Tekin	DF	1977–1979	3	0	
490	Nuri Toygun	FW	1969	3	0	
491	Mustafa Turgat	MF	1979–1980	3	0	
492	Ülken Durak	DF	1990–1991	3	0	
493	Şenol Ustaömer	MF	1984–1985	3	0	
494	Mücahit Yalçıntaş	MF	1988	3	0	
495	Selçuk Yalçıntaş	MF	1974	3	0	
496	Hüseyin Yazıcı	DF	1967–1968	3	0	
497	**Uğur Demirok**	DF	2014–	3	0	
498	**Güven Yalçın**	FW	2019–	3	0	
499	**Salih Uçan**	MF	2013–	3	0	
500	**Ahmed Kutucu**	FW	2019–	3	0	
501	**Yusuf Akçiçek**	DF	2025–	3	0	
502	**Mustafa Eskihellaç**	DF	2025–	3	0	
503	**Berke Özer**	GK	2025–	3	0	
504	**Emirhan Topçu**	DF	2024–	3	0	
505	**Aral Şimşir**	FW	2026–	2	1	
506	Çağdaş Atan	DF	2004	2	1	
507	Eşref Bilgiç	FW	1931–1932	2	1	
508	Aykut Yiğit	FW	1984	2	0	
509	Şevket Yorulmaz	FW	1950–1951	2	0	
510	Ali Bilgin	DF	2006	2	0	
511	Cafer Aydın	FW	1997	2	0	
512	Aydın Tohumcu	GK	1967–1968	2	0	
513	Hüseyin Kartal	FW	2003	2	0	
514	Osman Akyol	MF	1994–1996	2	0	
515	Yekta Kurtuluş	MF	2010–2011	2	0	
516	Yiğit İncedemir	MF	2010	2	0	
517	Tuncay Mesçi	MF	1976–1981	2	0	
518	Abdullah Duran	MF	1991	2	0	
519	Lütfü Aksoy	DF	1932–1936	2	0	
520	Sadık Aksöz	FW	1981	2	0	
521	Yaşar Alpaslan	DF	1936	2	0	
522	Batuhan Karadeniz	FW	2008–2009	2	0	
523	Muammer Birdal	DF	1981	2	0	
524	Aydın Çelik	FW	1975–1977	2	0	
525	Cengiz Atila	DF	1994–1995	2	0	
526	Ahmet Ceyhan	DF	1978	2	0	
527	Muzaffer Çizer	FW	1931–1932	2	0	
528	Necdet Çoruh	MF	1956	2	0	
529	Erdoğan Dağdelen	MF	1949	2	0	
530	Coşkun Demirbakan	DF	1978	2	0	
531	Erol Dinler	FW	1984	2	0	
532	Candan Dumanlı	FW	1962	2	0	
533	Kamil Ekin	MF	1950	2	0	
534	Engin Özdemir	MF	1996	2	0	
535	Ercan Koloğlu	DF	1990–1995	2	0	
536	Çetiner Erdoğan	FW	1971–1975	2	0	
537	Necmettin Erdoğdu	DF	1949–1950	2	0	
538	Savaş Erol	DF	1978	2	0	
539	Ercan Ertuğ	FW	1955–1956	2	0	
540	Evren Turhan	MF	1997	2	0	
541	Coşkun Ferman	MF	1965	2	0	
542	Necati Göçmen	FW	1971	2	0	
543	Nedim Günar	DF	1954–1955	2	0	
544	Bahattin Güneş	DF	1985	2	0	
545	Arif Güney	FW	1979	2	0	
546	Halil İbrahim Kara	DF	1994–1995	2	0	
547	Şeref İncirmen	DF	1980	2	0	
548	Burhan Işın	MF	1926–1927	2	0	
549	Vahit Kolukısa	DF	1971	2	0	
550	Nejat Küçüksorgunlu	DF	1957	2	0	
551	Vahyi Oktay	DF	1926	2	0	
552	Numan Okumuş	DF	1965	2	0	
553	Ömer Kılıç	DF	1995	2	0	
554	Necmi Onarıcı	FW	1954	2	0	
555	Zeki Önatlı	MF	1988	2	0	
556	Güven Önüt	FW	1965	2	0	
557	Osman Akyol	MF	1994–1996	2	0	
558	Osman Yıldırım	MF	1990–1991	2	0	
559	Vahap Özbayar	MF	1971	2	0	
560	Hasan Kemal Özdemir	MF	1985–1990	2	0	
561	Özer Hurmacı	MF	2010	2	0	
562	Mümin Özkasap	GK	1969	2	0	
563	Turgay Poyraz	DF	1981	2	0	
564	Faruk Sağnak	FW	1951	2	0	
565	Yalçın Saner	DF	1963	2	0	
566	Doğan Sel	DF	1964–1965	2	0	
567	Selahattin Özbir	DF	1996	2	0	
568	Tuğrul Şener	FW	1974	2	0	
569	Sercan Görgülü	FW	1990	2	0	
570	Serdar Topraktepe	MF	1996–1997	2	0	
571	Sinan Kaloğlu	FW	2006–2008	2	0	
572	Selim Soydan	FW	1962	2	0	
573	Tarık Daşgün	MF	1995–1998	2	0	
574	İsmail Taviş	DF	1986	2	0	
575	Abdurrahman Temel	MF	1971	2	0	
576	Altan Tetik	MF	1965	2	0	
577	Tolga Doğantez	DF	2001	2	0	
578	Burhan Tözer	MF	1969	2	0	
579	Muhtar Tucaltan	MF	1951	2	0	
580	İbrahim Tusder	MF	1936	2	0	
581	Zafer Tüzün	FW	1984	2	0	
582	Cemil Usta	DF	1976	2	0	
583	Volkan Kilimci	GK	1996–1998	2	0	
584	Müjdat Yalman	DF	1974	2	0	
585	Bilal Yaşar	DF	1982–1983	2	0	
586	Aleko Yordan	MF	1962	2	0	
587	Yusuf Tepekule	MF	1993–1994	2	0	
588	Kamil Rona	FW	1924	2	0	
589	Soner Aydoğdu	MF	2012	2	0	
590	Cenk Gönen	GK	2012	2	0	
591	Harun Tekin	GK	2017	2	0	
592	Barış Yardımcı	DF	2017	2	0	
593	Atila Turan	DF	2017	2	0	
594	**Aytaç Kara**	MF	2013–	2	0	
595	**Ertuğrul Ersoy**	DF	2018–	2	0	
596	**Mert Çetin**	MF	2019–	2	0	
597	**Halil Akbunar**	MF	2021–	2	0	
598	**Doğan Alemdar**	GK	2022–	2	0	
599	**İlhan Fakılı**	MF	2026–	2	0	
600	**Bartuğ Elmaz**	MF	2026–	2	0	
601	**Atakan Karazor**	MF	2025–	2	0	
602	**Muhammed Şengezer**	GK	2026–	1	0	
603	**Melih Kabasakal**	MF	2026–	1	0	
604	**Uğur Çiftçi**	MF	2013–	1	0	
605	**Atınç Nukan**	DF	2015–	1	0	
606	**Ümit Kurt**	DF	2015–	1	0	
607	**Güray Vural**	MF	2017–	1	0	
608	**Tarkan Serbest**	MF	2018–	1	0	
609	**Ömer Ali Şahiner**	MF	2019–	1	0	
610	**Abdulkadir Parmak**	MF	2019–	1	0	
611	**Mert Hakan Yandaş**	MF	2020–	1	0	
612	**Gökhan Akkan**	GK	2021–	1	0	
613	**Alpaslan Öztürk**	DF	2021–	1	0	
614	**Tiago Çukur**	FW	2022–	1	0	
615	**Umut Bozok**	FW	2022–	1	0	
616	**Tayyip Talha Sanuç**	DF	2022–	1	0	
617	**Yasin Özcan**	DF	2025–	1	0	
618	Ergun Öztuna	FW	1957	1	1	
619	Ziya Doğan	MF	1984	1	0	
620	Giray Kaçar	DF	2011	1	0	
621	Abdullah Matay	FW	1958	1	0	
622	Zeynel Soyuer	DF	1961	1	0	
623	Altan Aksoy	MF	1998	1	0	
624	Serkan Aykut	FW	1997	1	0	
625	Ahmet Açıkgöz	MF	1961	1	0	
626	Ertan Adatepe	FW	1962	1	0	
627	Adnan Erkan	GK	1996	1	0	
628	Kadir Akbulut	DF	1986	1	0	
629	İsmail Akbaşlı	FW	1984	1	0	
630	Ayhan Akbin	FW	1980	1	0	
631	Hakkı Alaç	MF	1936	1	0	
632	Ali Güneş	MF	2004	1	0	
633	Ali Tandoğan	MF	2004	1	0	
634	Münir Altay	DF	1961	1	0	
635	Erhan Altın	DF	1981	1	0	
636	Bahri Altıntabak	DF	1961	1	0	
637	Ersel Altıparmak	FW	1969	1	0	
638	Erhan Arslan	GK	1985	1	0	
639	Bilal Arular	DF	1978	1	0	
640	Muzaffer Atacan	MF	1980	1	0	
641	Bora Öztürk	FW	1981	1	0	
642	Rasim Atala	GK	1926	1	0	
643	Aydın Toscalı	DF	2007	1	0	
644	Baki Mercimek	DF	2006	1	0	
645	Bekir Barçın	MF	1977	1	0	
646	Faruk Barlas	DF	1937	1	0	
647	Fevzi Baron	DF	1923	1	0	
648	Selim Bayburt	MF	1937	1	0	
649	İsmet Berberoğlu	DF	1950	1	0	
650	Emin Bey	MF	1923	1	0	
651	Bülent Bölükbaşı	MF	2004	1	0	
652	İhsan Büyükbuğdaypınar	DF	1966	1	0	
653	Beyhan Çalışkan	MF	1985	1	0	
654	Cenk İşler	FW	2000	1	0	
655	Hüseyin Çetinkaya	DF	1980	1	0	
656	Ceyhun Eriş	MF	2009	1	0	
657	Necdet Cici	FW	1932	1	0	
658	Yavuz Çoker	DF	1965	1	0	
659	Timuçin Çuğ	DF	1973	1	0	
660	Cüneyt Aksu	MF	1996	1	0	
661	Cahit Dikici	MF	1961	1	0	
662	Hasan Ekin	MF	1932	1	0	
663	Emre Toraman	DF	2006	1	0	
664	Erbil Uzel	MF	1996	1	0	
665	Ercüment Şahin	FW	1996	1	0	
666	Haluk Erdemoğlu	FW	1965	1	0	
667	Erkan Özbey	DF	2002	1	0	
668	Rasim Erten	GK	1977	1	0	
669	Özcan Esinduy	MF	1955	1	0	
670	Faruk Bayar	DF	2004	1	0	
671	Feti Okuroğlu	DF	1994	1	0	
672	Fevzi Tuncay	GK	2000	1	0	
673	Mustafa Gedik	FW	1981	1	0	
674	Aydın Güleş	MF	1972	1	0	
675	Türker Gülsoy	MF	1971	1	0	
676	Yüksel Gündüz	FW	1962	1	0	
677	Zeki Günel	FW	1926	1	0	
678	Bülent Gürbüz	GK	1955	1	0	
679	Mustafa Güven	FW	1959	1	0	
680	Hakan Bayraktar	MF	2001	1	0	
681	Hamza Hamzaoğlu	MF	1993	1	0	
682	Hasan Çelik	FW	1993	1	0	
683	Hasan Vural	DF	1996	1	0	
684	İbrahim Köseoğlu	MF	1996	1	0	
685	Melih Ilgaz	MF	1950	1	0	
686	İlhan Sancaktar	DF	1996	1	0	
687	Yenal Kaçıra	DF	1953	1	0	
688	Akgün Kaçmaz	MF	1953	1	0	
689	Rahmi Kaleci	FW	1961	1	0	
690	Mustafa Kaplakaslan	FW	1975	1	0	
691	Ömer Kaner	MF	1974	1	0	
692	Özer Kanra	FW	1963	1	0	
693	Orhan Kapucu	FW	1986	1	0	
694	Sedat Karaoğlu	DF	1981	1	0	
695	Selahattin Karasu	MF	1973	1	0	
696	Kadri Kartal	MF	1956	1	0	
697	Yorgo Kasapoğlu	FW	1956	1	0	
698	İbrahim Kelle	MF	1923	1	0	
699	Ahmet Keloğlu	MF	1984	1	0	
700	Kenan Yelek	DF	2004	1	0	
701	Şevket Kesler	DF	1981	1	0	
702	Seracettin Kırklar	MF	1956	1	0	
703	Erdal Kocaçimen	GK	1949	1	0	
704	Özcan Köksoy	DF	1965	1	0	
705	Rıza Köprülü	MF	1937	1	0	
706	Doğan Küçükduru	FW	1974	1	0	
707	Kürşat Duymuş	DF	2004	1	0	
708	Rasih Minkari	FW	1937	1	0	
709	Mehmet Yılmaz	FW	2004	1	0	
710	Mustafa Özkan	FW	2003	1	0	
711	Necip Uysal	MF	2010	1	0	
712	Aydemir Nemli	FW	1956	1	0	
713	Nuri Çolak	DF	2001	1	0	
714	Süleyman Oktay	DF	1981	1	0	
715	Orkun Usak	GK	2006	1	0	
716	Ahmet Özacar	FW	1962	1	0	
717	Vahap Özaltay	FW	1932	1	0	
718	Tezcan Ozan	FW	1974	1	0	
719	Mustafa Özbey	GK	1980	1	0	
720	Özden Öngün	GK	1998	1	0	
721	Hayati Özkan	MF	1932	1	0	
722	Ertan Öznur	FW	1969	1	0	
723	Orhan Özselek	DF	1975	1	0	
724	Niyazi Öztunç	FW	1936	1	0	
725	Hasan Polat	MF	1937	1	0	
726	Ahmet Şahin	FW	1965	1	0	
727	Sedat Balkanlı	DF	1993	1	0	
728	Serdar Kulbilge	GK	2007	1	0	
729	Nevruz Şerif	MF	1976	1	0	
730	Yavuz Şimşek	GK	1971	1	0	
731	Sinan Yeşil	MF	1996	1	0	
732	Hasan Kamil Sporel	DF	1923	1	0	
733	Tamer Tuna	DF	2000	1	0	
734	Tayfun Hut	DF	1991	1	0	
735	Güngör Tetik	MF	1963	1	0	
736	Muammer Tokgöz	DF	1950	1	0	
737	Refik Osman Top	MF	1924	1	0	
738	Mehmet Tuncer Ergon	MF	1971	1	0	
739	İhsan Türemen	MF	1932	1	0	
740	Turgay Bahadır	FW	2010	1	0	
741	Ufuk Süer	DF	1996	1	0	
742	Uğur Dağdelen	FW	1998	1	0	
743	Uğur İnceman	MF	2004	1	0	
744	Mustafa Ulucan	DF	1982	1	0	
745	Ümit Birol	MF	1991	1	0	
746	Ümüt Hatipoğlu	MF	1996	1	0	
747	Kemalettin Ünlü	DF	1952	1	0	
748	Bülent Varol	FW	1950	1	0	
749	Vedat Vatansever	MF	1992	1	0	
750	Yasin Çakmak	DF	2008	1	0	
751	Yasin Çelik	DF	1998	1	0	
752	Altay Yavuzaslan	GK	1969	1	0	
753	Necdet Yıldırım	DF	1968	1	0	
754	Talat Yörük	MF	1965	1	0	
755	Aydın Yılmaz	MF	2012	1	0	
756	Şeref Görkey	FW	1936	1	1	
