= List of Turkey international footballers =

This is a list of Turkey international footballers – football players who have played for the Turkey national football team.

This page lists men's footballers with 20 or more caps for Turkey. For fewer appearances, see players with 1–4 and 5–19 caps.

== Key to positions ==
GK	Goalkeeper
DF	Defender
MF	Midfielder
FW	Forward
Bold	Still playing competitive football

== List of players ==
As of 15 November 2026

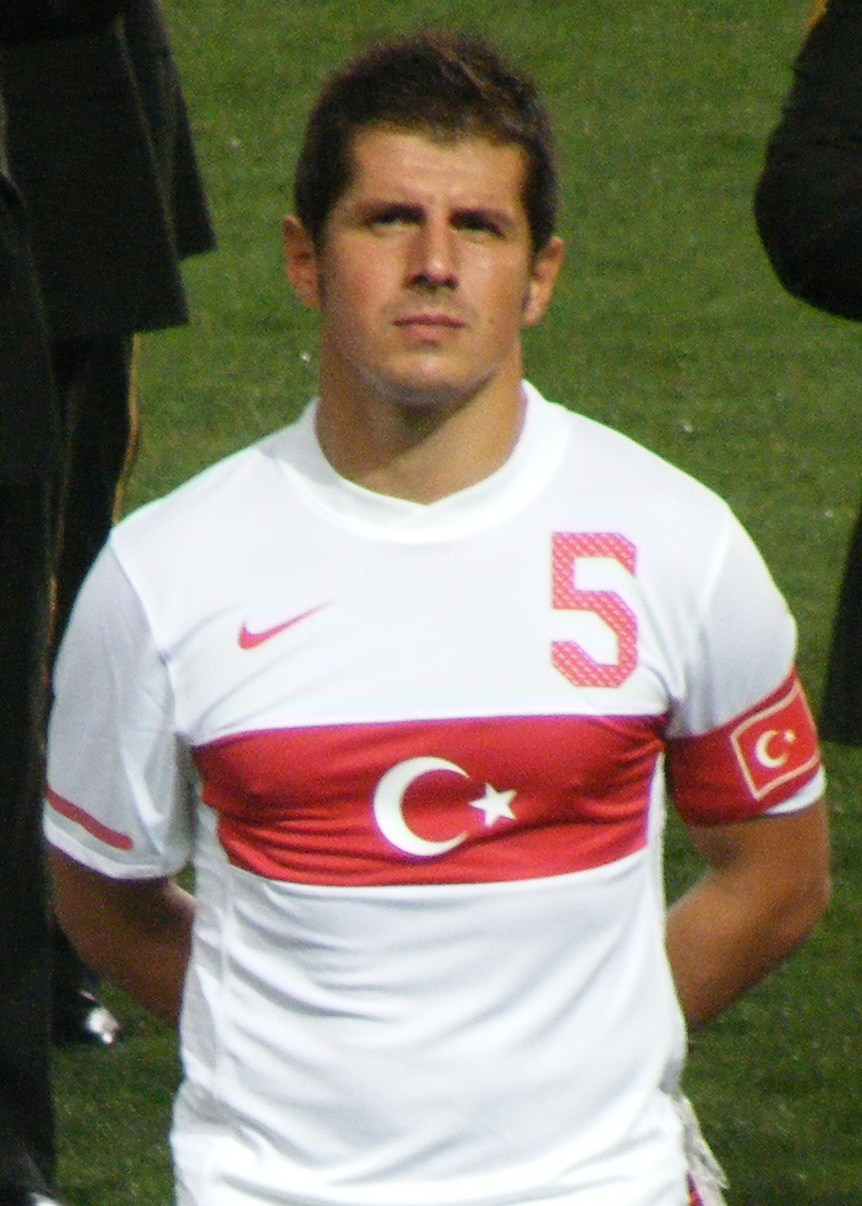
Emre Belözoğlu made 101 appearances for Turkey

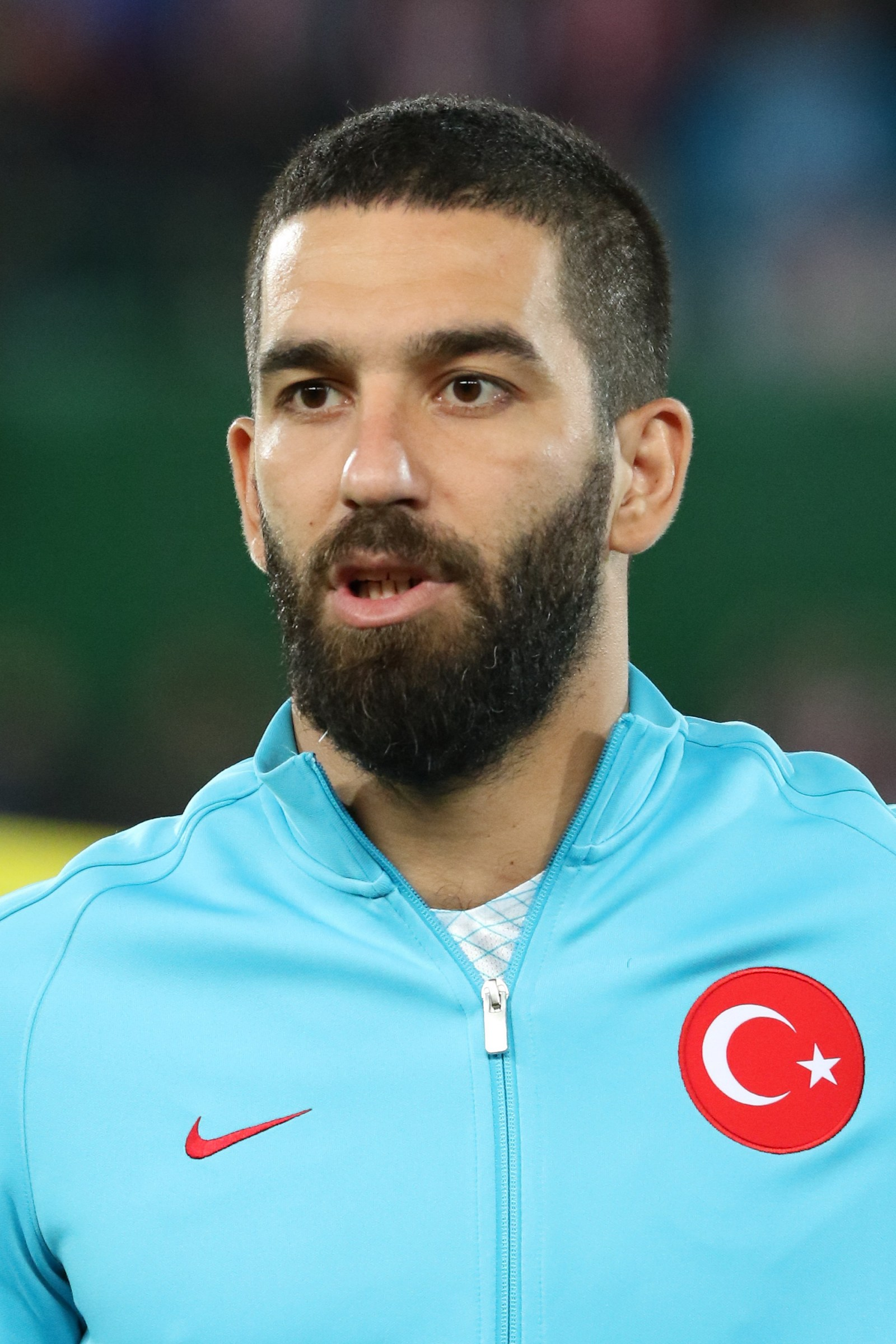
Arda Turan made 100 appearances for Turkey

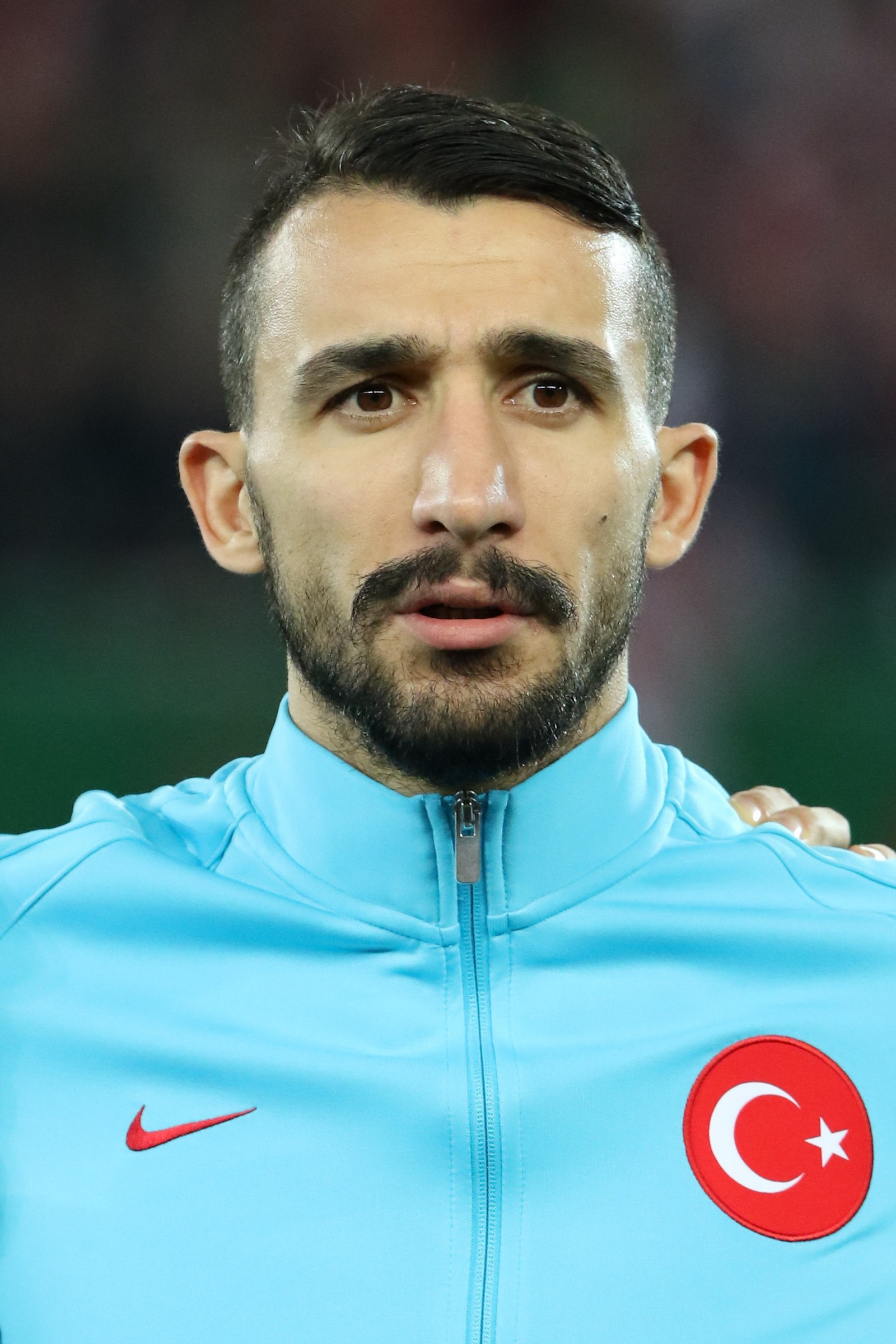
Mehmet Topal made 81 appearances for Turkey

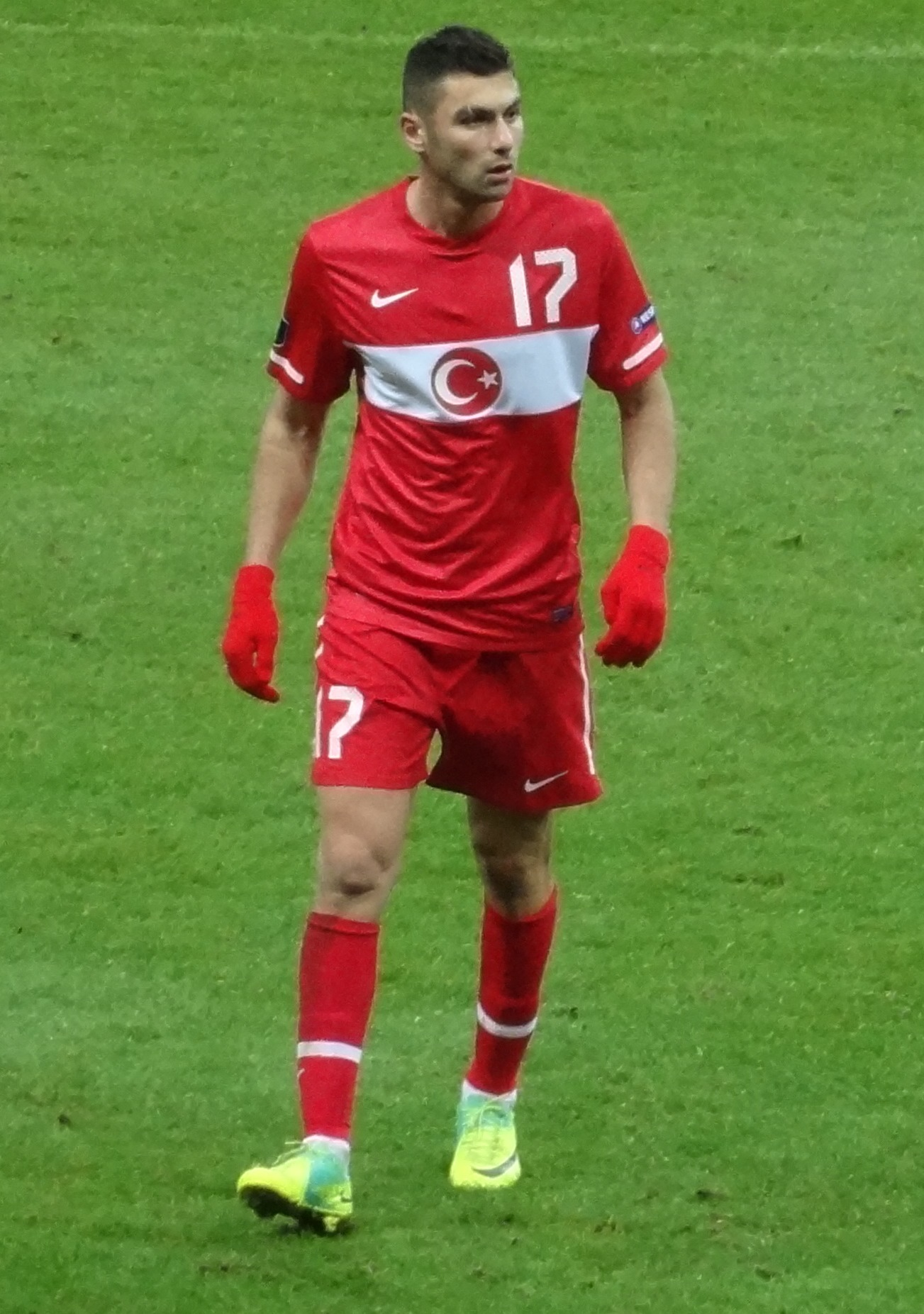
Burak Yılmaz made 77 appearances for Turkey

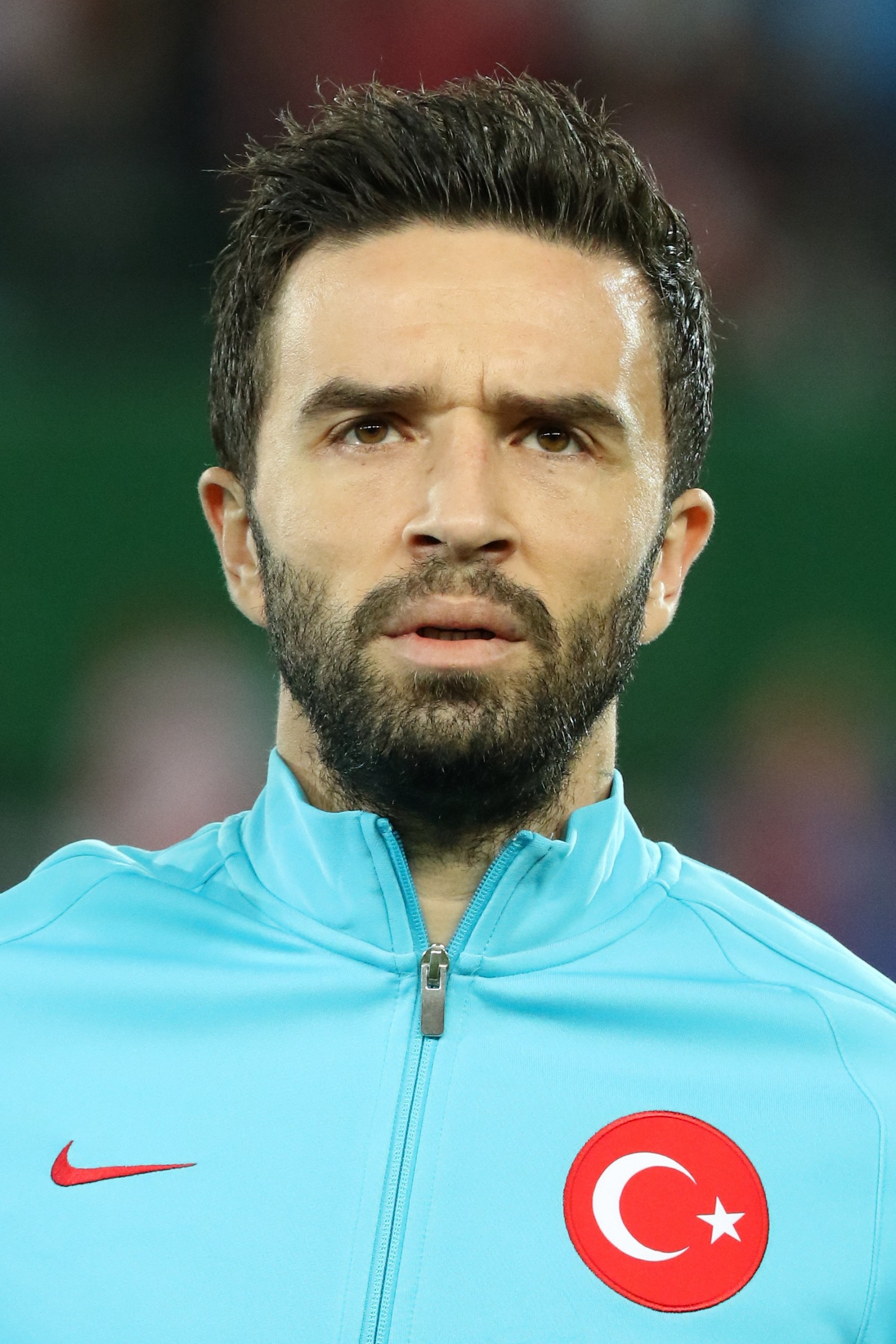
Gökhan Gönül made 66 appearances for Turkey

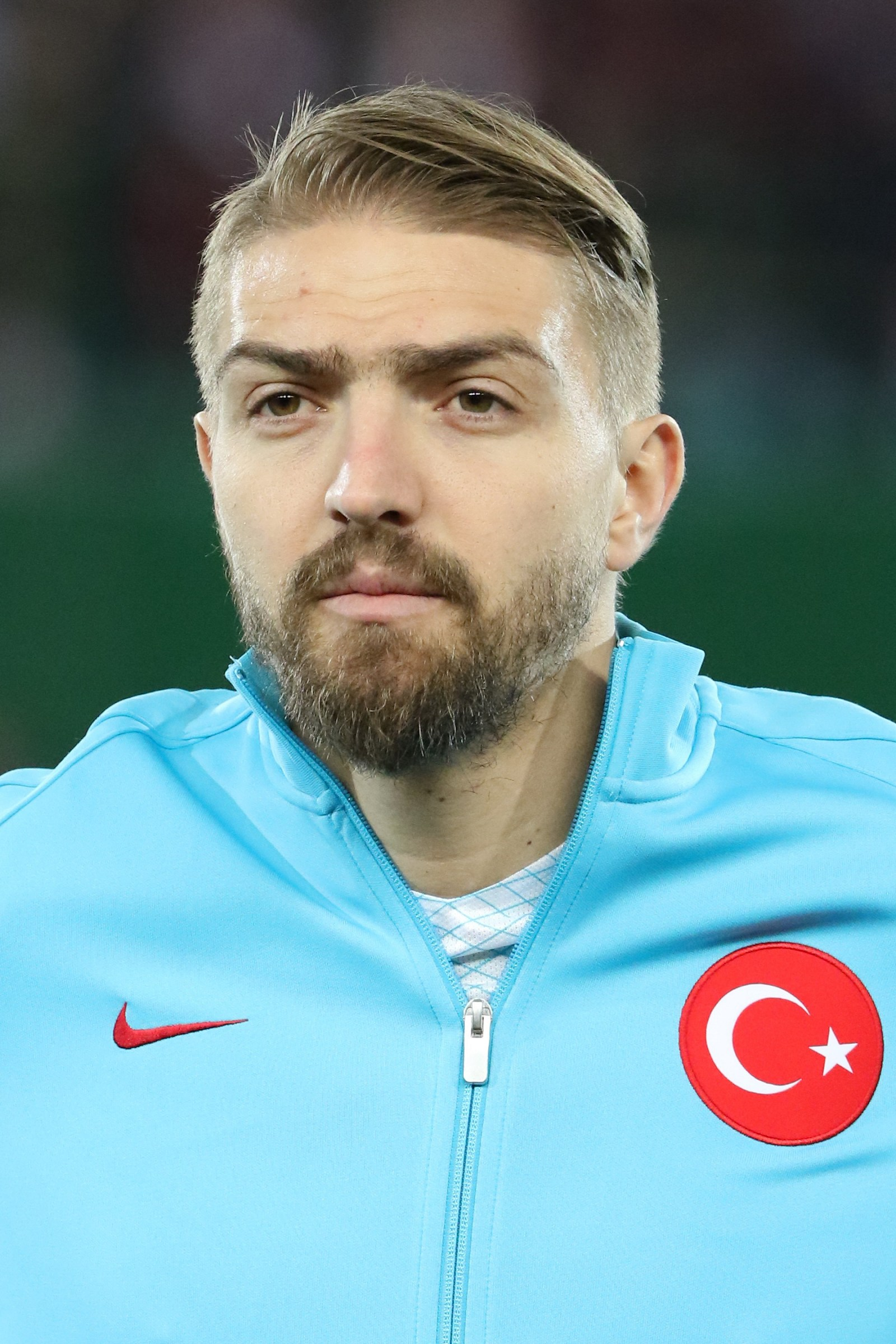
Caner Erkin made 63 appearances for Turkey

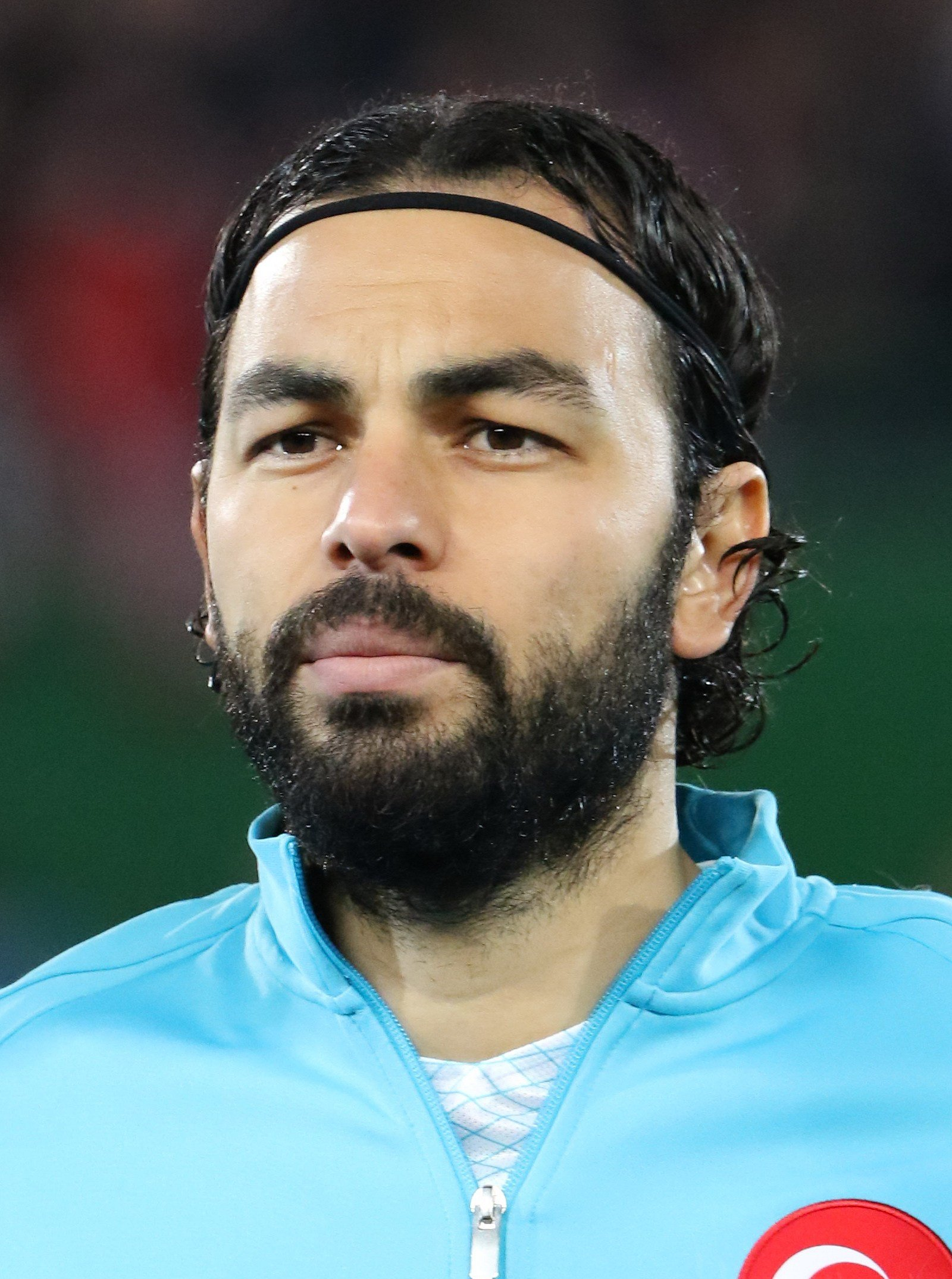
Selçuk İnan made 61 appearances for Turkey

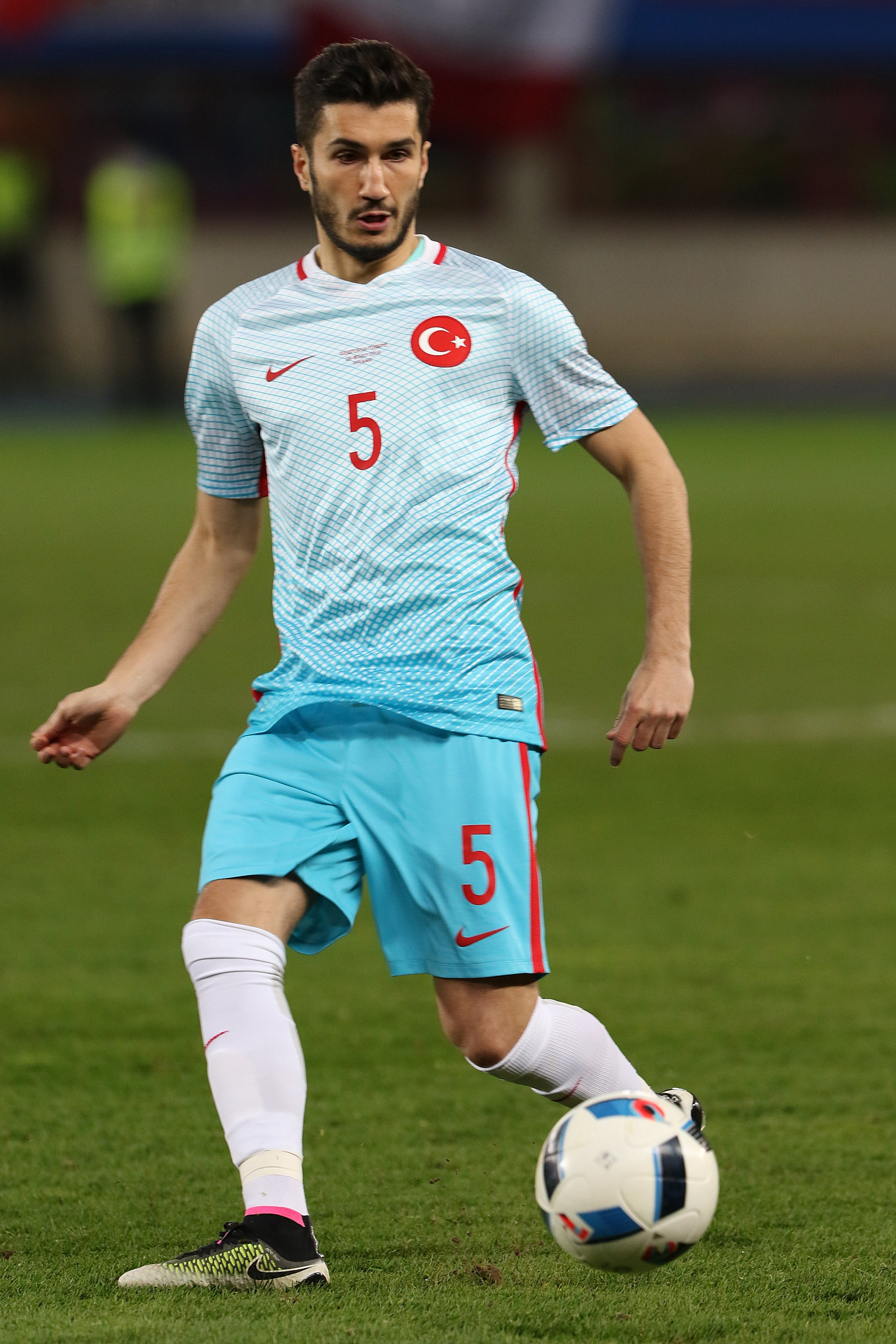
Nuri Şahin made 52 appearances for Turkey

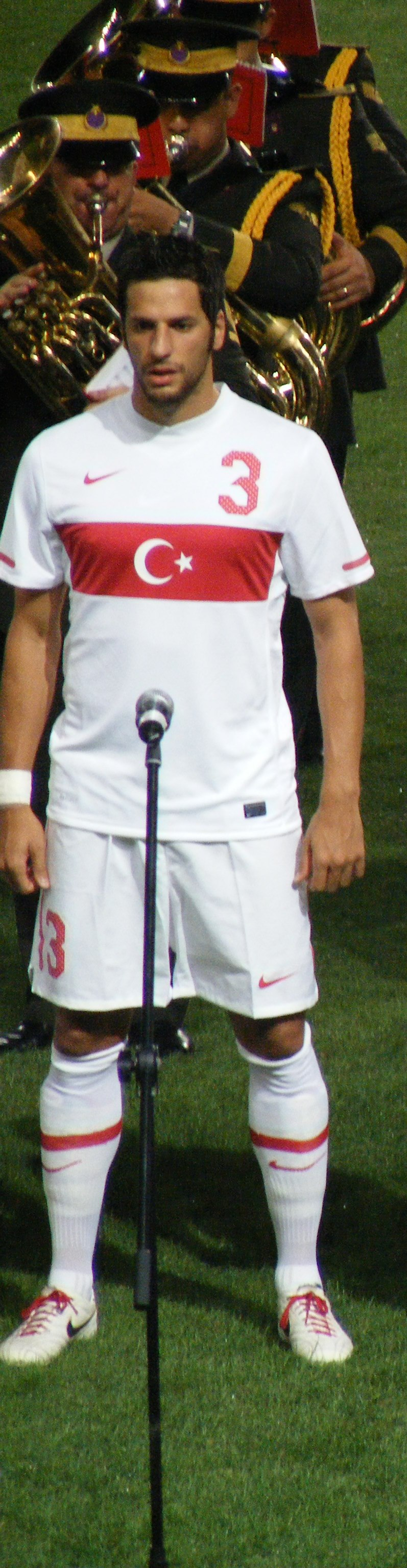
Hakan Balta made 50 appearances for Turkey

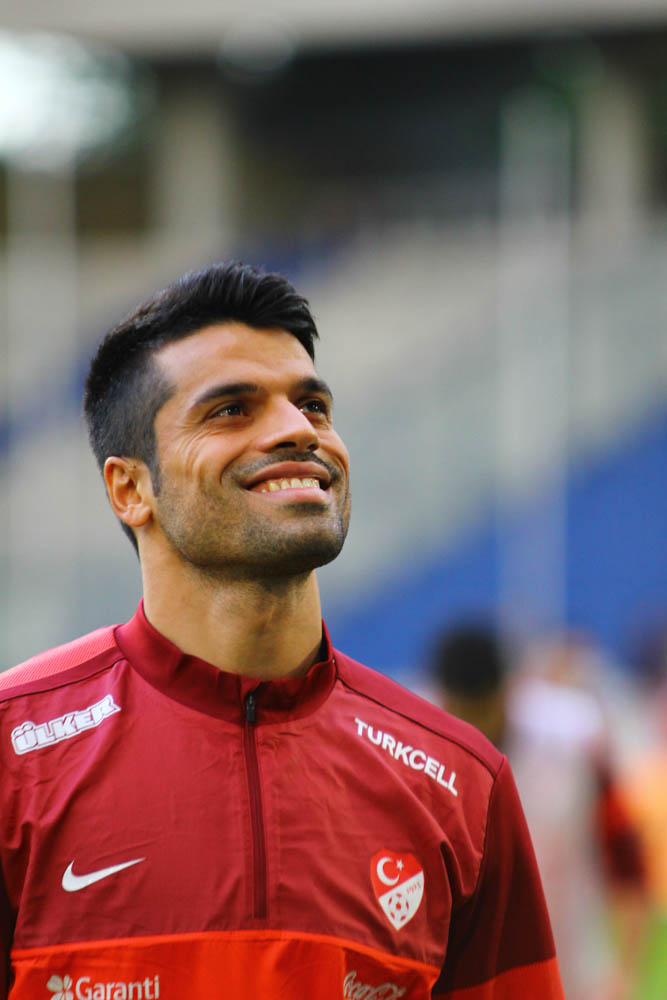
Gökhan Zan made 35 appearances for Turkey

Rank	Name	Position	Years	Caps	Goals	Ref.
1	Rüştü Reçber	GK	1993–2012	120	0	
2	Hakan Şükür	FW	1992–2008	112	51	
3	**Hakan Çalhanoğlu**	MF	2013–	110	22	
4	Bülent Korkmaz	DF	1990–2005	102	2	
5	Emre Belözoğlu	MF	2000–2019	101	9	
6	Arda Turan	MF	2006–2017	100	17	
7	Tugay Kerimoğlu	MF	1990–2007	94	2	
8	Alpay Özalan	DF	1995–2005	87	4	
9	Hamit Altıntop	MF	2004–2014	82	7	
10	Mehmet Topal	MF	2008–2018	81	2	
11	Tuncay Şanlı	FW	2002–2010	80	22	
12	Burak Yılmaz	FW	2006–2022	77	31	
13	Ogün Temizkanoğlu	MF	1990–2002	76	5	
14	**Kaan Ayhan**	DF	2016–	74	6	
15	Abdullah Ercan	MF	1993–2003	71	0	
16	Oğuz Çetin	MF	1988–1998	70	3	
17	Nihat Kahveci	FW	2000–2010	69	19	
18	**Merih Demiral**	DF	2018–	69	6	
19	**Zeki Çelik**	DF	2018–	68	3	
20	Gökhan Gönül	DF	2007–2019	66	1	
21	**Ozan Tufan**	MF	2014–	65	9	
22	Fatih Akyel	DF	1997–2004	64	0	
23	Caner Erkin	DF	2006–2021	63	2	
24	Volkan Demirel	GK	2004–2014	63	0	
25	**Çağlar Söyüncü**	DF	2016–	61	2	
26	Selçuk İnan	MF	2007–2017	61	8	
27	Arif Erdem	FW	1994–2003	60	11	
28	Servet Çetin	DF	2003–2011	59	3	
29	**Kerem Aktürkoğlu**	MF	2021–	58	15	
30	Okan Buruk	MF	1992–2010	56	8	
31	Recep Çetin	DF	1988–1997	56	1	
32	**Orkun Kökçü**	MF	2020–	56	4	
33	**Cenk Tosun**	FW	2013–	53	21	
34	Fatih Terim	DF	1975–1985	52	2	
35	Nuri Şahin	MF	2005–2017	52	2	
36	**Cengiz Ünder**	MF	2016–	51	16	
37	Gökdeniz Karadeniz	MF	2003–2008	50	6	
38	Hakan Balta	DF	2006–2016	50	2	
39	**İrfan Can Kahveci**	MF	2018–	49	6	
40	Yıldıray Baştürk	MF	1998–2008	49	2	
41	**Mert Müldür**	DF	2018–	48	3	
42	Hami Mandıralı	MF	1987–1999	48	8	
43	Ergün Penbe	MF	1994–2006	48	0	
44	**Okay Yokuşlu**	MF	2015–	47	1	
45	**Uğurcan Çakır**	GK	2019–	46	0	
46	Lefter Küçükandonyadis	FW	1948–1963	46	21	
47	Turgay Şeren	GK	1950–1966	46	0	
48	Tayfur Havutçu	MF	1994–2004	45	6	
49	**Yusuf Yazıcı**	MF	2017–	45	3	
50	Cemil Turan	FW	1969–1979	44	19	
51	Sabri Sarıoğlu	DF	2006–2011	44	1	
52	Oğuzhan Özyakup	MF	2013–2019	43	1	
53	**Barış Alper Yılmaz**	MF	2021–	43	7	
54	Tayfun Korkut	MF	1995–2003	42	1	
55	Ümit Davala	DF	1996–2004	41	4	
56	Ümit Özat	DF	2000–2005	41	1	
57	Gökhan Keskin	DF	1987–1995	41	0	
58	Hasan Şaş	MF	1998–2006	40	2	
59	**İsmail Yüksek**	MF	2022–	40	1	
60	Umut Bulut	FW	2007–2018	39	10	
61	Şeref Has	FW	1956–1967	39	1	
62	**Arda Güler**	MF	2022–	38	8	
63	Halil Altıntop	FW	2004–2011	38	8	
64	Rıza Çalımbay	MF	1981–1992	38	1	
65	**Salih Özcan**	MF	2022–	38	1	
66	Mehmet Aurélio	MF	2006–2011	37	2	
67	Colin Kazim-Richards	FW	2007–2015	37	2	
68	İbrahim Üzülmez	DF	2003–2009	37	1	
69	**Mert Günok**	GK	2012–	37	0	
70	Sergen Yalçın	MF	1994–2003	37	5	
71	**Ferdi Kadıoğlu**	DF	2022–	37	2	
72	Metin Oktay	FW	1956–1965	36	19	
73	Ünal Karaman	MF	1985–1996	36	3	
74	**Abdülkerim Bardakcı**	DF	2023–	35	3	
75	**Enes Ünal**	FW	2015–	35	3	
76	Mevlüt Erdinç	FW	2008–2016	35	8	
77	Hasan Ali Kaldırım	DF	2012–2020	35	1	
78	Gökhan Zan	DF	2006–2013	35	0	
79	Turgay Semercioğlu	FW	1975–1981	35	0	
80	Volkan Babacan	GK	2014–2018	35	0	
81	**Ozan Kabak**	DF	2019–	34	2	
82	Sedat Özden	MF	1977–1984	34	7	
83	Metin Tekin	MF	1983–1995	34	2	
84	Naci Erdem	DF	1955–1965	34	0	
85	Emre Aşık	DF	1993–2010	33	3	
86	Tolunay Kafkas	MF	1994–1998	33	3	
87	Hakan Ünsal	DF	1996–2004	33	0	
88	**Kenan Yıldız**	FW	2023–	32	5	
89	Ogün Altıparmak	FW	1961–1968	32	6	
90	**Kenan Karaman**	MF	2017–	32	6	
91	Engin İpekoğlu	GK	1989–1999	32	0	
92	Tanju Çolak	FW	1984–1991	31	9	
93	Şenol Güneş	GK	1976–1987	31	0	
94	Mehmet Özdilek	MF	1991–1997	31	0	
95	İbrahim Toraman	DF	2002–2010	30	1	
96	Erdoğan Arıca	DF	1977–1986	30	0	
97	Yusuf Altıntaş	MF	1983–1994	29	2	
98	Mustafa Ertan	DF	1949–1961	29	1	
99	Ercan Aktuna	DF	1964–1971	29	0	
100	Ahmet Berman	DF	1955–1962	29	0	
101	Olcay Şahan	MF	2013–	29	2	
102	**Eren Elmalı**	DF	2022–	29	0	
103	Semih Şentürk	FW	2007–2011	28	9	
104	Orhan Çıkırıkçı	MF	1991–1996	28	2	
105	İsmail Köybaşı	DF	2009–2017	28	0	
106	İsmail Arca	DF	1968–1977	27	1	
107	İsmail Demiriz	DF	1983–1988	27	0	
108	Basri Dirimlili	DF	1951–1961	27	0	
109	Hüseyin Çimşir	MF	2004–2007	27	0	
110	Suat Mamat	MF	1954–1963	27	5	
111	Ali Kemal Denizci	MF	1975–1982	27	3	
112	Ömer Toprak	DF	2011–2017	27	2	
113	Tümer Metin	MF	2003–2008	26	7	
114	Volkan Şen	MF	2010–2017	26	2	
115	Alpaslan Eratlı	DF	1970–1983	26	1	
116	Talat Özkarslı	DF	1962–1968	26	1	
117	Engin Verel	MF	1974–1982	26	0	
118	Kadri Aytaç	MF	1953–1962	26	0	
119	Gökhan Töre	MF	2011–2015	26	0	
120	Can Bartu	MF	1956–1969	26	6	
121	Ertuğrul Sağlam	FW	1993–1997	26	12	
122	Feyyaz Uçar	FW	1987–1993	25	7	
123	Rıdvan Dilmen	MF	1984–1992	25	4	
124	Metin Kurt	FW	1968–1975	25	4	
125	Erdal Keser	FW	1982–1991	25	3	
126	**Yunus Mallı**	MF	2015–	25	1	
127	Ali Artuner	GK	1965–1971	25	0	
128	Fatih Tekke	FW	1998–2007	25	9	
129	Selçuk Şahin	MF	2003–2011	25	0	
130	**Yunus Akgün**	MF	2022–	25	4	
131	Serkan Balcı	DF	2003–2011	24	0	
132	Cem Pamiroğlu	DF	1977–1984	23	0	
133	Semih Kaya	DF	2012–2015	23	0	
134	Selçuk Yula	FW	1981–1988	22	4	
135	Sanlı Sarıalioğlu	FW	1964–1971	22	2	
136	Zekeriya Alp	DF	1971–1975	22	0	
137	Necati Özçağlayan	DF	1975–1981	22	0	
138	Ayhan Akman	MF	1998–2009	22	0	
139	Mahmut Tekdemir	MF	2015–2021	22	0	
140	İlhan Mansız	FW	2002–2003	21	7	
141	Ziya Şengül	MF	1964–1975	21	2	
142	Nihat Bekdik	MF	1923–1932	21	1	
143	Deniz Barış	MF	2003–2007	21	0	
144	Semih Yuvakuran	DF	1978–1985	21	0	
145	Raşit Çetiner	DF	1978–1985	20	1	
146	Muzaffer Sipahi	DF	1962–1973	20	0	
