= Arda Turan =

Turkish footballer (born 1987)

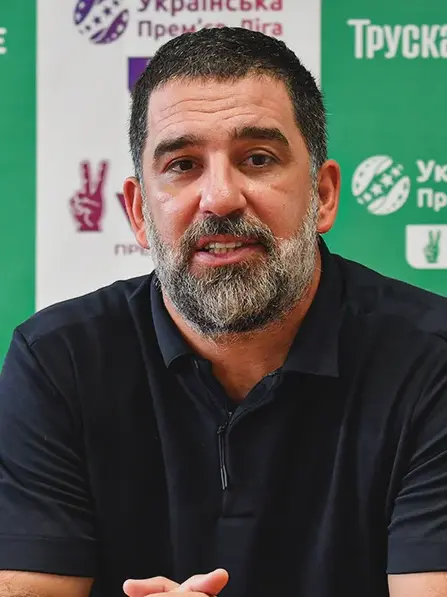
- Turan in 2025

Personal information
- Full name: Arda Turan
- Date of birth: 30 January 1987 (age 39)
- Place of birth: Fatih, Istanbul, Turkey
- Height: 1.77 m (5 ft 10 in)
- Position: Midfielder

Team information
- Current team: Shakhtar Donetsk (Head Coach)

Youth career
- 1999–2000: Altıntepsi Makelspor
- 2000–2005: Galatasaray

Senior career*
Years	Team	Apps	(Gls)
2005–2011	Galatasaray	130	(29)
2006	→ Manisaspor (loan)	15	(2)
2011–2015	Atlético Madrid	127	(14)
2015–2020	Barcelona	36	(5)
2018–2020	→ Başakşehir (loan)	37	(2)
2020–2022	Galatasaray	39	(4)
Total		384	(55)

International career
2002	Turkey U16	10	(2)
2003–2004	Turkey U17	30	(3)
2003–2005	Turkey U18	11	(2)
2004–2006	Turkey U19	17	(6)
2005	Turkey U20	2	(0)
2006	Turkey U21	2	(0)
2006–2017	Turkey	100	(17)

Managerial career
- 2023–2025: Eyüpspor
- 2025–: Shakhtar Donetsk
- * Club domestic league appearances and goals

Arda Turan (born 30 January 1987) is a Turkish professional football manager and former player who is currently the head coach of Ukrainian Premier League club Shakhtar Donetsk.

During his playing career, which included six years in the Spanish La Liga with Atlético Madrid and Barcelona, Turan was mostly known for his ball control, dribbling skills and vision. At age 22, prior to the 2009–10 season, he was named captain of Galatasaray.

Following a successful UEFA Euro 2008 campaign, Turan was ranked eighth in a selection of the 100 Best Young Football Players in the World piece published by Spanish magazine Don Balón in July 2008. Turan was ranked 38th in "The 100 Best Footballers in the World" by The Guardian in 2014, the only player on the list to be born in Turkey. On 25 November 2014, Turan was nominated for the UEFA Team of the Year for 2014, among 39 other players.

Turan gained 100 senior national caps and scored 17 goals for the Turkey national team, making him Turkey's sixth-most capped player of all-time.

== Club career ==
=== Galatasaray ===
Turan is a product of the Galatasaray youth. He was promoted to the Galatasaray first-team by manager Gheorghe Hagi in 2004–05 season, and he made his official debut against Bursaspor in a Turkish Cup match on 22 January 2005. He then had a spell on loan to fellow Süper Lig side Manisaspor in the second half of the 2005–06 season. In the 2005–06 season, Turan scored two goals for the team based in Manisa.

Turan was recalled to Galatasaray for the start of the 2006–07 season and quickly broke into the first team. It was during this time that he received his first senior international call up. He helped Galatasaray qualify for the following season's UEFA Champions League group stage. Turan continued his development in the 2007–08 season, scoring seven goals in the second half of the season.

At the start of the 2009–10 season, Turan was handed the captaincy of Galatasaray and given squad number 10, which had previously belonged to Metin Oktay and Hagi; Turan previously wore number 66.

As captain at the start of season, Turan guided his team to six consecutive league wins games which put Galatasaray comfortably at the top of the table. In the 2010–11 season, he was troubled with injuries and played a limited number of games. By the end of the season, he had played in only 12 league matches, scoring two goals; and in three Turkish Cup matches, where he scored one. His impressive performances over the last four years of his Galatasaray career lead to interest from Spanish club Atlético Madrid.

=== Atlético Madrid ===
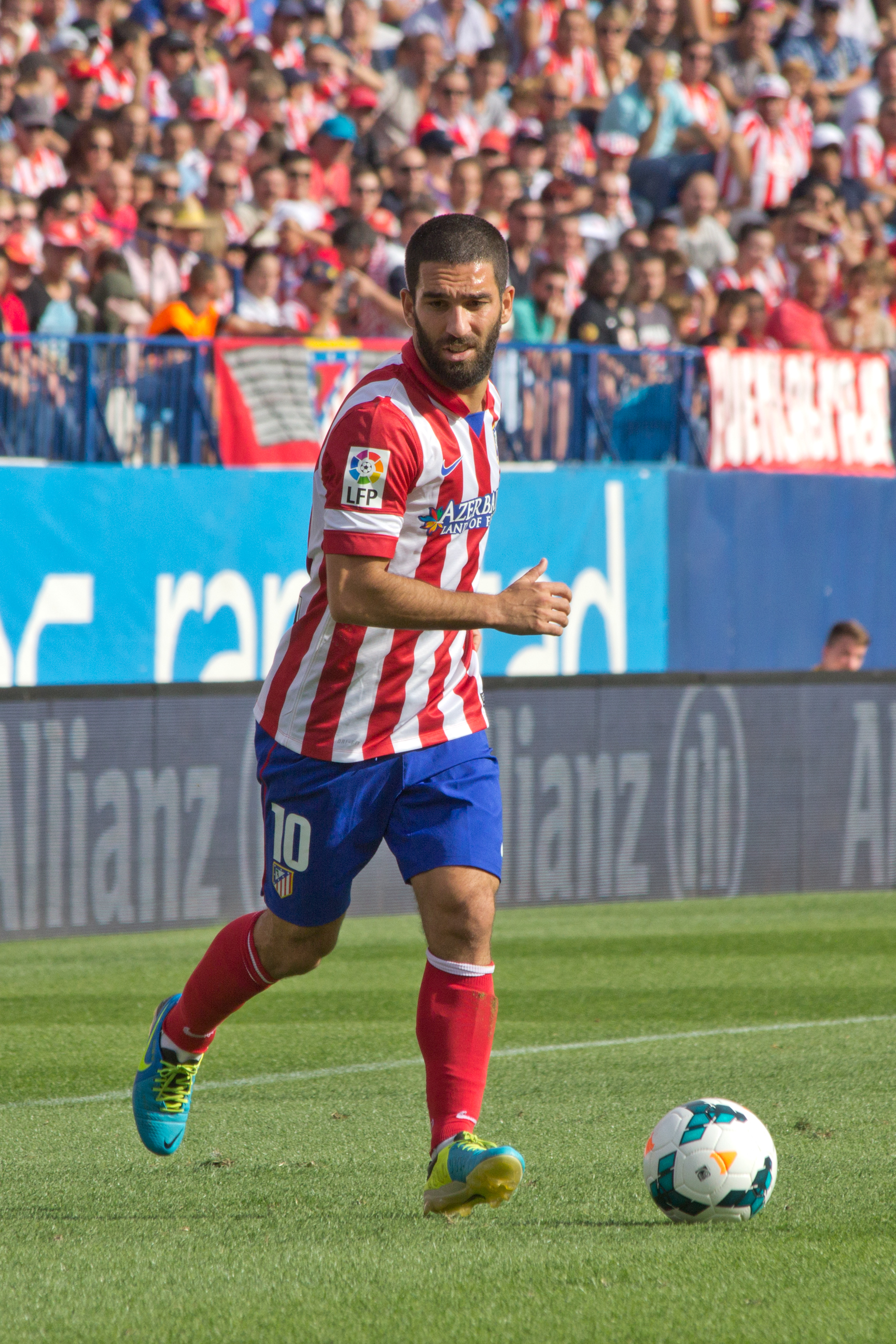
Turan playing for Atlético Madrid in 2013

In the late hours of 9 August 2011, it was announced Turan would be joining Atlético Madrid for a €12 million transfer fee plus bonuses, making him the most expensive Turkish footballer of all-time.

==== 2011–12 ====
He was handed the number 11 shirt and made his 2011–12 La Liga debut on 28 August 2011 against Osasuna, entering as a substitute in the second half. He made his UEFA Europa League debut on 15 September against Celtic, starting the match and assisting a goal. On 18 September, he was again selected for the starting XI and provided two assists.

On 25 October, Galatasaray club president Ünal Aysal stated Turan will come back to Galatasaray in the future under right of first refusal that was signed between Galatasaray and Atlético during an interview with Lig TV. On 30 November, Turan scored his first goal for Atlético in a Europa League match against Celtic with a powerful volley. On 11 December, he scored his first La Liga goal with a driven volley just outside the box. In the Europa League match that followed, he netted again in a 3–1 win against Rennes.

Turan scored two goals in two minutes as Atlético defeated Espanyol 3–1 on 22 April 2012 to move his side into seventh place in the league standings and just three points behind Málaga for the final Champions League spot. On 9 May, in the 2012 UEFA Europa League Final against Athletic Bilbao, he made an assist to his teammate Radamel Falcao, which made the score 2–0.

==== 2012–13 ====
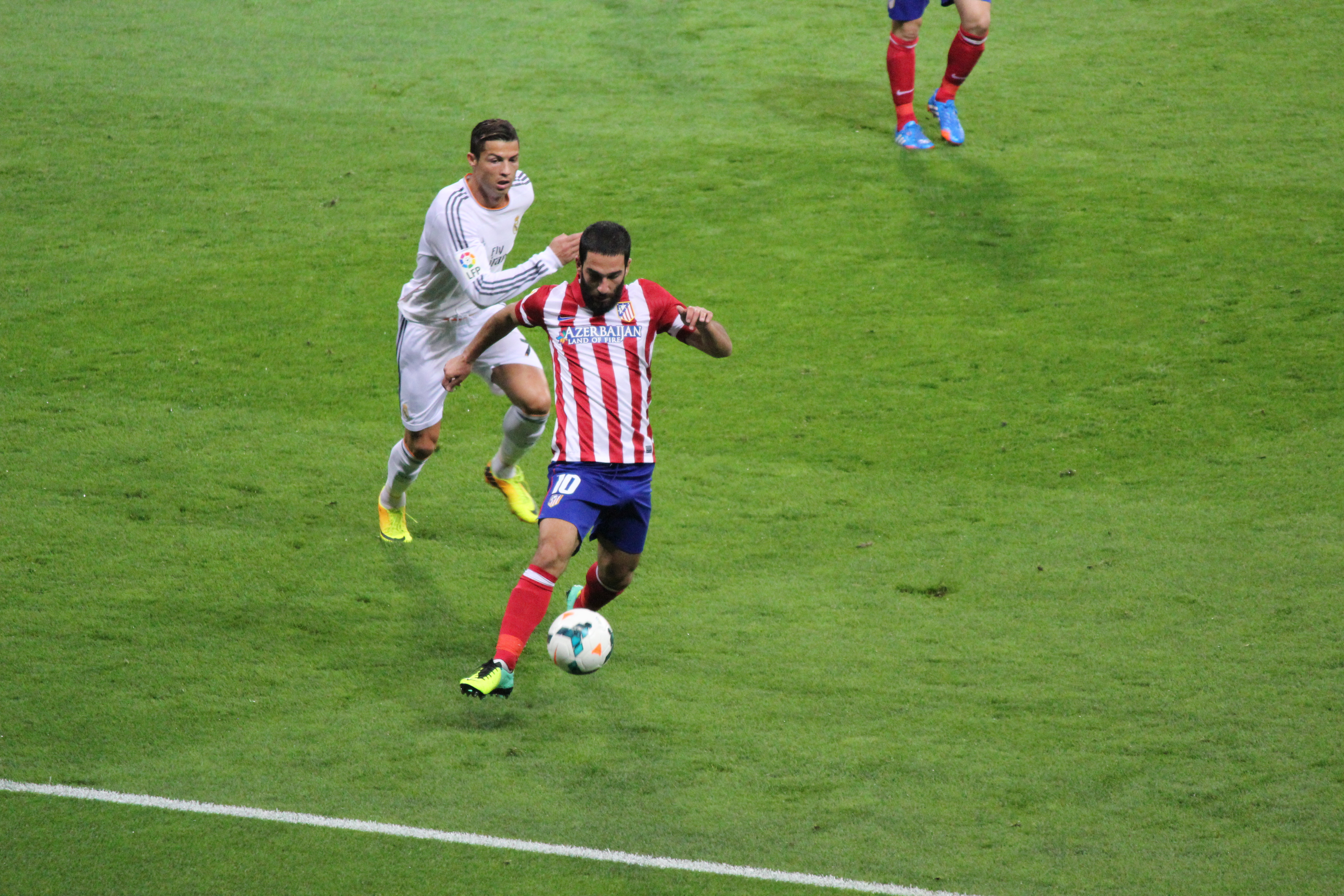
Turan against Ronaldo during Madrid derby in 2013

Turan's number was changed from 11 to 10 before the 2012–13 season. He began his season with a game-tying long-distance screamer in Atlético's 1–1 La Liga season opener against Levante. He then won the 2012 UEFA Super Cup with Atlético against Champions League victors Chelsea, assisting Falcao for the third goal of the game in a 4–1 victory. On 16 September 2012, he scored the third goal of the game against Rayo Vallecano in a 4–3 home win.

==== 2013–14 ====
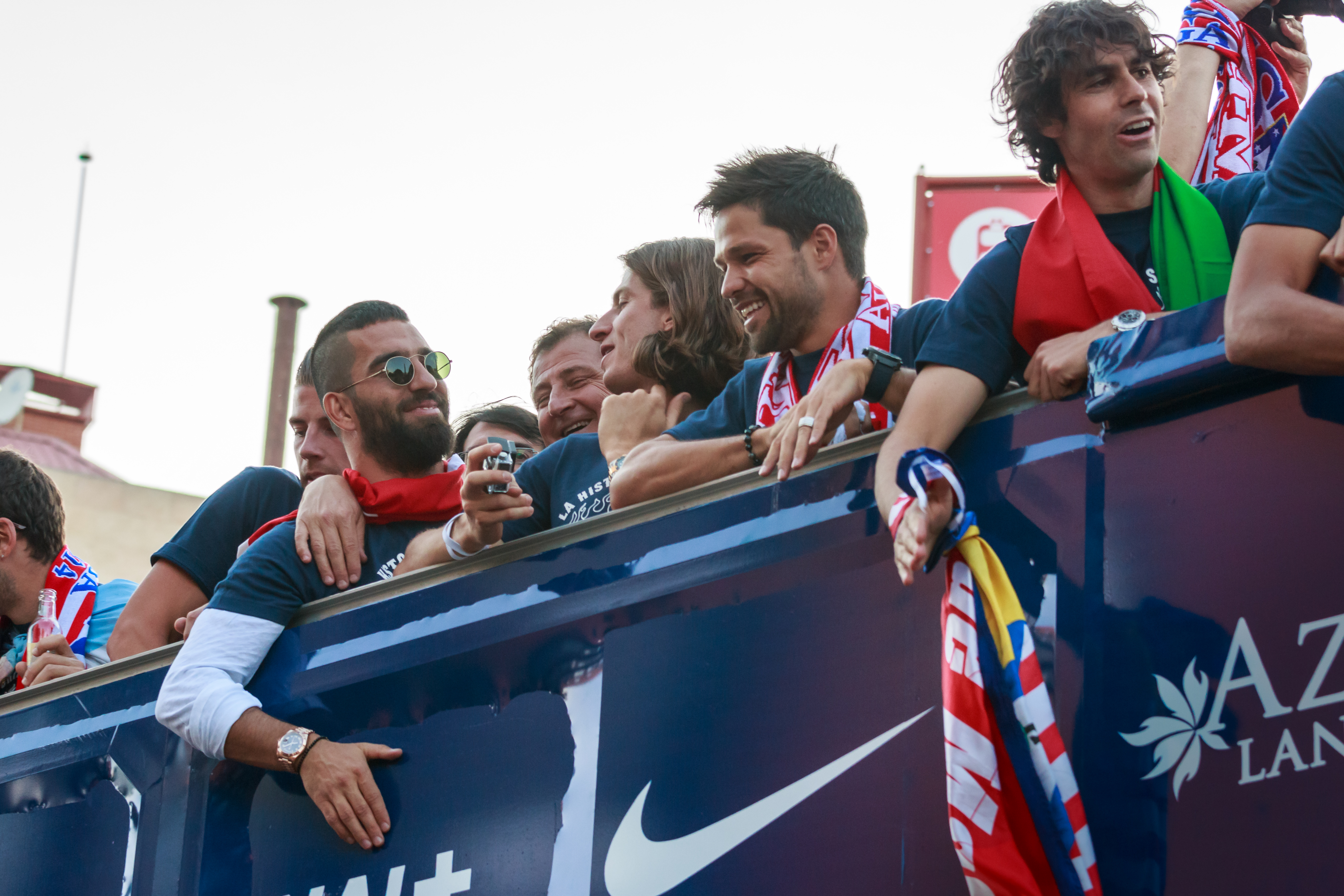
Turan (in sunglasses) on Atlético's victory parade after winning La Liga in 2014

He was instrumental in Atlético's wins in their first two 2013–14 Champions League matches against Zenit Saint Petersburg and Porto, scoring a goal in each match. On 30 April 2014, he scored the last goal of a 3–1 away win against Chelsea in the semi-finals of the Champions League, sending Atlético to the final for the first time since 1974.

==== 2014–15 ====
On 13 September 2014, entering the match as a substitute one hour into the match, Turan scored the decisive goal in the 76th minute for Atlético in their 1–2 away league win against derby rivals Real Madrid. After the match, Atlético manager Diego Simeone hailed Turan's impact on Atlético's game. On 1 October 2014, Turan scored the only goal of the match in the 1–0 win against Juventus in the group stage of the 2014–15 Champions League season. On 28 January 2015, in the 47th minute of the home leg of the Copa del Rey quarter-final against Barcelona, Turan threw his boot in the direction of the assistant referee, when he was denied a free-kick for an alleged foul by Ivan Rakitić. After the match, however, he was not handed a ban for the incident. Atlético were eliminated from the tournament as the match ended with a 2–3 defeat, 2–4 defeat on aggregate. On 22 April, Turan was sent off for a foul on Sergio Ramos as Atlético lost 0–1 at Real Madrid to be eliminated from the quarter-finals of the Champions League.

=== Barcelona ===
On 6 July 2015, Barcelona announced the signing of Turan from Atlético for €34 million, plus €7 million in variables. The contract would run for five seasons, but Turan would only be able to debut for the Catalans in January 2016, after Barcelona's transfer ban had been lifted. On 29 December 2015, Turan picked number 7 for his shirt. Starting the match in the starting line-up, Turan made his debut on 6 January 2016 in a Derbi barceloní encounter against Espanyol in the first leg of the round of 16 of the Copa del Rey, which ended 4–1 for Barcelona. He placed a shot in the second half that was saved by Espanyol goalkeeper Pau. Turan played his first Liga match with Barcelona on 9 January 2016, the 17th matchday of the season, at home against Granada. The match ended 4–0, with Turan assisting Lionel Messi's opening goal. On 17 August 2016, Turan scored twice and Lionel Messi once as Barcelona earned a 3–0 second-leg victory over Sevilla to win the 2016 Supercopa de España 5–0 on aggregate.

On 7 December 2016, Turan scored his first hat-trick for Barcelona during a Champions League group stage match against Borussia Mönchengladbach. He became the sixth player in Barça history to score a hat-trick in the Champions League, after Messi, Ronaldinho, Rivaldo, Samuel Eto'o and Neymar. This also marked Turan's first hat-trick in European competitions.

=== İstanbul Başakşehir (loan) ===
After not playing a single game for Barcelona in the 2017–18 season, Arda was loaned out to Turkish club İstanbul Başakşehir for the remainder of the season and two more, in the winter transfer window. He made his debut for the club in a league match on 21 January 2018, coming off the bench in the 65th minute mark and scoring the third goal in the 3–0 away win over Bursaspor. On 4 May 2018, Turan was sent off in a league match against Sivasspor for pushing an assistant referee after disagreeing with a ruling. He received a 16-match ban from the Turkish Federation's disciplinary board, the longest punishment ever issued to a player in the country. Later, however, the ban was reduced to 10 games by TFF's arbitration board. On 7 January 2020, Turan's loan was terminated six months early by Başakşehir.

=== Return to Galatasaray ===
On 5 August 2020, Galatasaray announced the signing of Turan on a two-year deal. Due to a long-term injury to goalkeeper Fernando Muslera, he was made the club's captain. He played his first official match of the 2020–21 season against Gaziantep in the Super League on 12 September. The next season, he played only seven matches and scored no goals.

=== Retirement ===
On 12 September 2022, Turan has shared via his social media account that he "hung up" his football boots. His retirement announcement also came along with a formal retirement video, put together by the Libre Channel.

== International career ==
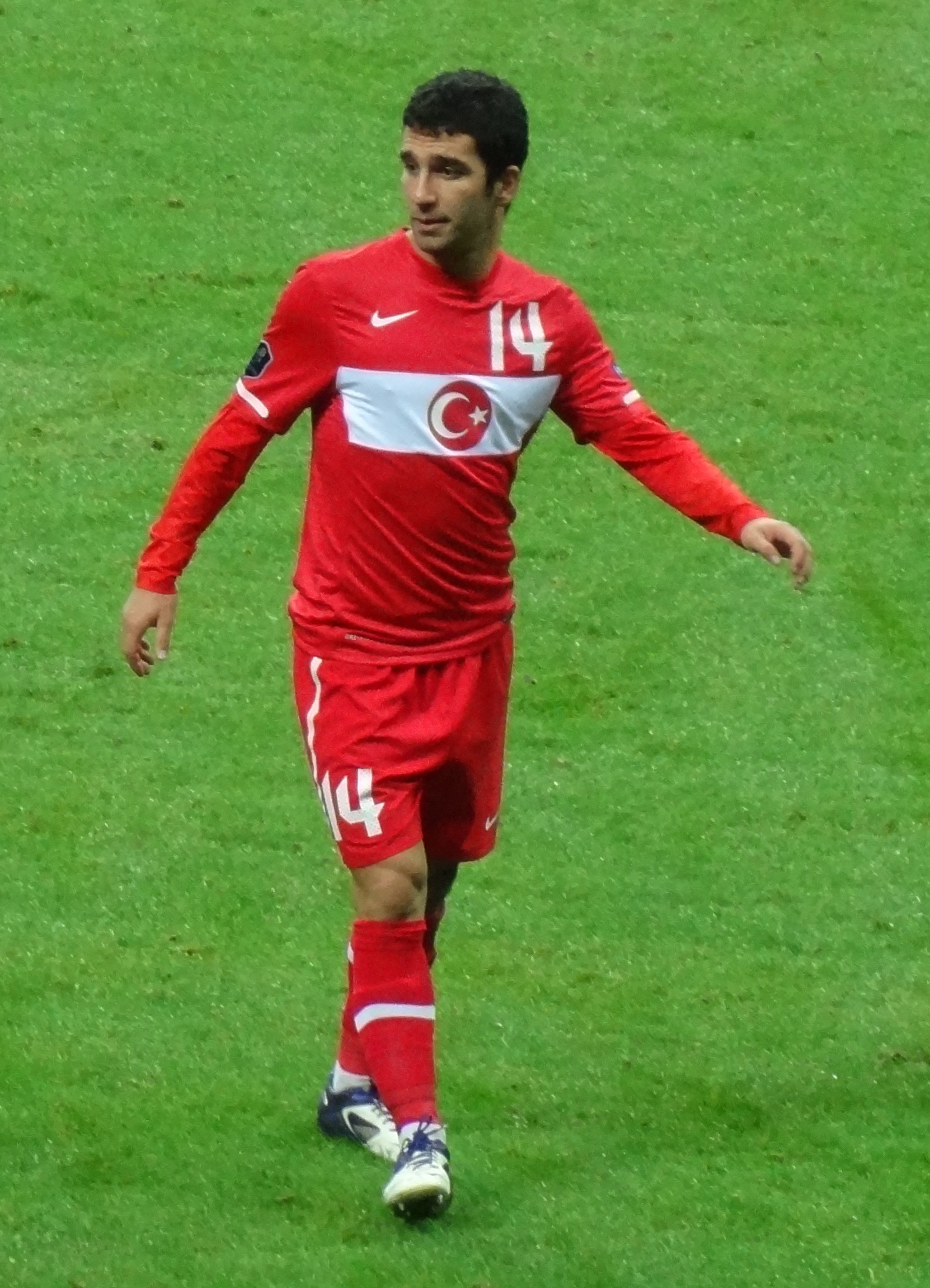
Turan playing for Turkey in 2011

Turan was a Turkish international regular, having made over 90 appearances for Turkey at senior level. He made his debut in the 1–0 friendly victory over Luxembourg on 16 August 2006, having worked his way through the youth national team at the under-19 and under-21 levels. He scored his first international goal on 25 May 2008 in a friendly against Uruguay.

Turan featured in nine of Turkey's 12 qualification matches for Euro 2008, and starred in the finals of the tournament itself. Turan scored two goals during Turkey's progression to the semi-finals. The first was a last-minute winner against co-hosts Switzerland in their second group stage match to eliminate them from the competition. His second came in the final group stage match against the Czech Republic, in which a draw would see a penalty shootout being played to determine who would go through to the quarter-finals because both teams had identical records. He scored Turkey's first goal in the second half, beating goalkeeper Petr Čech with a low shot, which led to Turkey coming from 2–0 down to win the match. He also successfully converted a spot-kick in the penalty shootout against Croatia in the quarter-finals, taking Turkey to the semi-finals, where they were eventually knocked out by losing finalists Germany.

Turan scored two goals during the qualification rounds of the 2010 FIFA World Cup, but ultimately Turkey failed to qualify from their group. After a qualifier in September 2008 between Armenia and Turkey – the two sides having historical political problems – both teams received a FIFA Fair Play Award for 2008.

Turan scored the Turkish national team's 600th international goal in a 2010 World Cup qualification game, against Estonia on 5 September 2009. he scored four goals for Turkey during the qualification rounds of the Euro 2012, two against Kazakhstan, one against Belgium, and one against Austria. Turkey, however, could not qualify for the final stages of Euro 2012 after being eliminated by Croatia in the play-offs.

In June 2017, Turan attacked verbally and tried to strangulate journalist Bilal Meşe in a plane trip back from a game against Macedonia. He then stated that he didn't feel any remorse and that he would not be playing for Turkey anymore. However, after the sacking of head coach Fatih Terim and the new coach Mircea Lucescu expressing his wish for Turan to return, he declared in August that he would resume playing for Turkey.

He was granted his 100th and final international appearance for Turkey in the 3–0 defeat to Iceland national football team in 2018 World Cup qualifying group match in October 2017.

== Managerial career ==
=== Eyüpspor ===
On 14 April 2023, Turan was appointed as manager of TFF First League club Eyüpspor on a one-and-a-half-year contract. His first game in charge, on 16 April, resulted in a 1–0 away loss against Göztepe, completing the game without any shots on target. On 7 April 2024, he guided his club to secure promotion to Süper Lig for the first time in their history, after defeating Altay 4–1. On the final matchday of the 2023–24 season, the club clinched the division title with a commanding 4–0 away win against Erzurumspor.

On 25 May 2025, Turan announced his departure from Eyüpspor following the expiration of his contract, after leading the club to a sixth-place finish in their debut season in the top division.

=== Shakhtar Donetsk ===
On 27 May 2025, Turan became the head coach of Ukrainian club Shakhtar Donetsk, signing a 2-year contract. He succeeded Marino Pusic with the objective of reclaiming domestic dominance after the club's third-place finish in the previous season. Turan's managerial debut was marked by a record-breaking 6–0 victory over Finnish side Ilves in the UEFA Europa League qualifiers, which established a new club record for the largest margin of victory in European qualification rounds.

Throughout the 2025–26 season, Turan managed the squad under the constraints of the ongoing war in Ukraine, with the team playing home matches in Lviv and Kraków. In an interview, Turan highlighted the psychological resilience of his players, noting instances where the team had to utilize bomb shelters on the eve of matches. Tactically, he implemented a high-pressing 4-3-3 system focused on youth development following the departures of key players like Heorhiy Sudakov. Notable domestic results included a 7–1 victory over SK Poltava in November 2025 and a 3–0 win against Karpaty Lviv in February 2026, featuring a hat-trick by Lassina Traoré.

In his first season, he won the league championship and reached the 2025-26 UEFA Conference League semifinals, getting knocked out by Crystal Palace who won the tournament.

== Outside football ==
On 16 November 2008, Turan collapsed during a match against İstanbul BB. After being rushed to hospital, he was diagnosed with cardiac arrhythmia. The day after the incident, doctors declared that Turan was in good health and that extreme exhaustion caused the arrhythmia. In November 2009, he suffered a minor bout of swine flu but recovered within a few days to resume training. In January 2009, he was involved in a car crash in Istanbul. Turan suffered no serious injuries and continued training with only cuts and bruises. Turan dated Turkish actress Sinem Kobal from August 2009. The pair became engaged in January 2010, splitting in late 2013. Turan married Aslıhan Doğan on 11 March 2018. President of Turkey Recep Tayyip Erdoğan attended the wedding where he was acting as a witness of the marriage. In October 2018, the couple's first child, a son named Hamza Arda, was born. Another son named Asil Aslan was born in June 2020. Arda Turan received a suspended sentence of 2 years and 8 months after being found guilty of firing a gun to cause panic, illegal possession of weapons and intentional injury. Turan got into a brawl with Berkay Şahin in 2018 which ended with a broken nose for the pop star. Turan appeared at the hospital with a gun, allegedly begging for forgiveness from Şahin, panic ensued after the footballer fired the weapon at the ground. Turan will not serve his jail term if no further incidents occur for five years.

=== Charity ===
Turan is also known for his humanitarian work, especially in the helping of sick children.

On 11 May 2014, Turan was announced as a goodwill ambassador for the Khojaly massacre. His ambassador activities are aimed to raise awareness about this issue and promoting world peace.

=== Media ===
In January 2010, Turan was voted as the third-most popular European footballer of 2009, as well as the 14th-most popular footballer in the world, by the International Federation of Football History & Statistics (IFFHS). He was featured on the cover of the video game FIFA 15 in Turkey. Together with his future teammate Lionel Messi.

=== Politics ===
Turan is known for his long-standing support of President of Turkey Recep Tayyip Erdoğan during the most of his professional career. Amid a period of conflict in Turkey, during the Kazakhstan–Turkey match on 3 September 2011, after Turan scored a goal, he stated "I dedicate this goal to the martyred sons of all the peoples of the Republic of Turkey. I don’t want this kind of violence in my country." His comments were met with severe outrage from Turkish nationalists, although he was praised by the Kurdish and Turkish left. In 2016, Turan stated that he wished for democracy and dialogue in Turkey before fighting, similar to Catalonia in Spain. PKK leader Mustafa Karasu later praised Turan and agreed with his words.

In his first Süper Lig match with Başakşehir in January 2018, he gave a military salute after scoring a goal against Bursaspor. In March 2018, during the Olive Branch Operation in Afrin, Turan donated blood to support the Turkish soldiers.

In 2022, Turan appeared on the program Az Önce Konuştum hosted by Candaş Tolga Işık on TV100. When asked, "You are heavily criticized for being politically close to the current government, based on your statements and certain photographs. Is this true?" Turan replied: "Absolutely not. Recep Tayyip Erdoğan is an elder whom I deeply respect. Politically speaking, however, I do not hold such views at all."

== Personal life ==
His father's family fled from Bulgarian persecution after the Russo-Turkish War of 1877–1878, and were settled on a farm in Havsa. They became established as a village named Bakşılar, although the village was mentioned as Ozanlar in 1909 Ottoman records. It was occupied for nine months during the First Balkan War. Many from the village later went to Istanbul for opportunities, including Turan's paternal family side. Turan's maternal family side were originally Albanians who settled in Bursa and later Istanbul.

Turan has commentated on UEFA Europa League matches throughout his football commentary career. He shared his views on the matchup between Shakhtar Donetsk and Beşiktaş in 2025.

He has two sons named Hamza Arda and Asil Aslan.

== Career statistics ==
=== Club ===
Club	Season	League			National cup (Note: Includes Turkish Cup, Copa del Rey)		Europe		Other		Total	
Club	Season	Division	Apps	Goals	Apps	Goals	Apps	Goals	Apps	Goals	Apps	Goals
Galatasaray	2004–05	Süper Lig	1	0	1	0	0	0	—		2	0
Galatasaray	2006–07	Süper Lig	29	5	3	1	7 (Note: Appearances in UEFA Champions League)	2	0	0	39	8
Galatasaray	2007–08	Süper Lig	30	7	7	0	7 (Note: Appearances in UEFA Cup)	1	—		44	8
Galatasaray	2008–09	Süper Lig	29	8	6	2	11 (Note: Two appearances in UEFA Champions League, nine appearances and two goals in UEFA Cup)	2	0	0	46	12
Galatasaray	2009–10	Süper Lig	29	7	6	4	12 (Note: Appearances in UEFA Europa League)	0	—		47	11
Galatasaray	2010–11	Süper Lig	12	2	3	1	4	3	—		19	6
Galatasaray	Total		130	29	26	8	41	8	0	0	197	45
Manisaspor (loan)	2005–06	Süper Lig	15	2	0	0	—		—		15	2
Atlético Madrid	2011–12	La Liga	33	3	0	0	12	2	—		45	5
Atlético Madrid	2012–13	La Liga	32	5	7	0	2	0	—		41	5
Atlético Madrid	2013–14	La Liga	30	3	5	2	9	4	2 (Note: Appearances in Supercopa de España)	0	46	9
Atlético Madrid	2014–15	La Liga	32	2	4	0	10	1	0	0	46	3
Atlético Madrid	Total		127	13	16	2	33	7	2	0	178	22
Barcelona	2015–16	La Liga	18	2	4	0	3	0	0	0	25	2
Barcelona	2016–17	La Liga	18	3	5	4	5	4	2	2	30	13
Barcelona	2017–18	La Liga	0	0	0	0	0	0	0	0	0	0
Barcelona	Total		36	5	9	4	8	4	2	2	55	15
İstanbul Başakşehir (loan)	2017–18	Süper Lig	11	2	0	0	—		—		11	2
İstanbul Başakşehir (loan)	2018–19	Süper Lig	17	0	2	0	—		—		19	0
İstanbul Başakşehir (loan)	2019–20	Süper Lig	9	0	0	0	3	0	—		12	0
İstanbul Başakşehir (loan)	Total		37	2	2	0	3	0	—		42	2
Galatasaray	2020–21	Süper Lig	32	4	1	0	1	0	—		34	4
Galatasaray	2021–22	Süper Lig	7	0	0	0	5	0	—		12	0
Galatasaray	Total		39	4	1	0	6	0	—		46	4
Career total			384	55	54	14	91	19	4	2	533	90

=== International ===
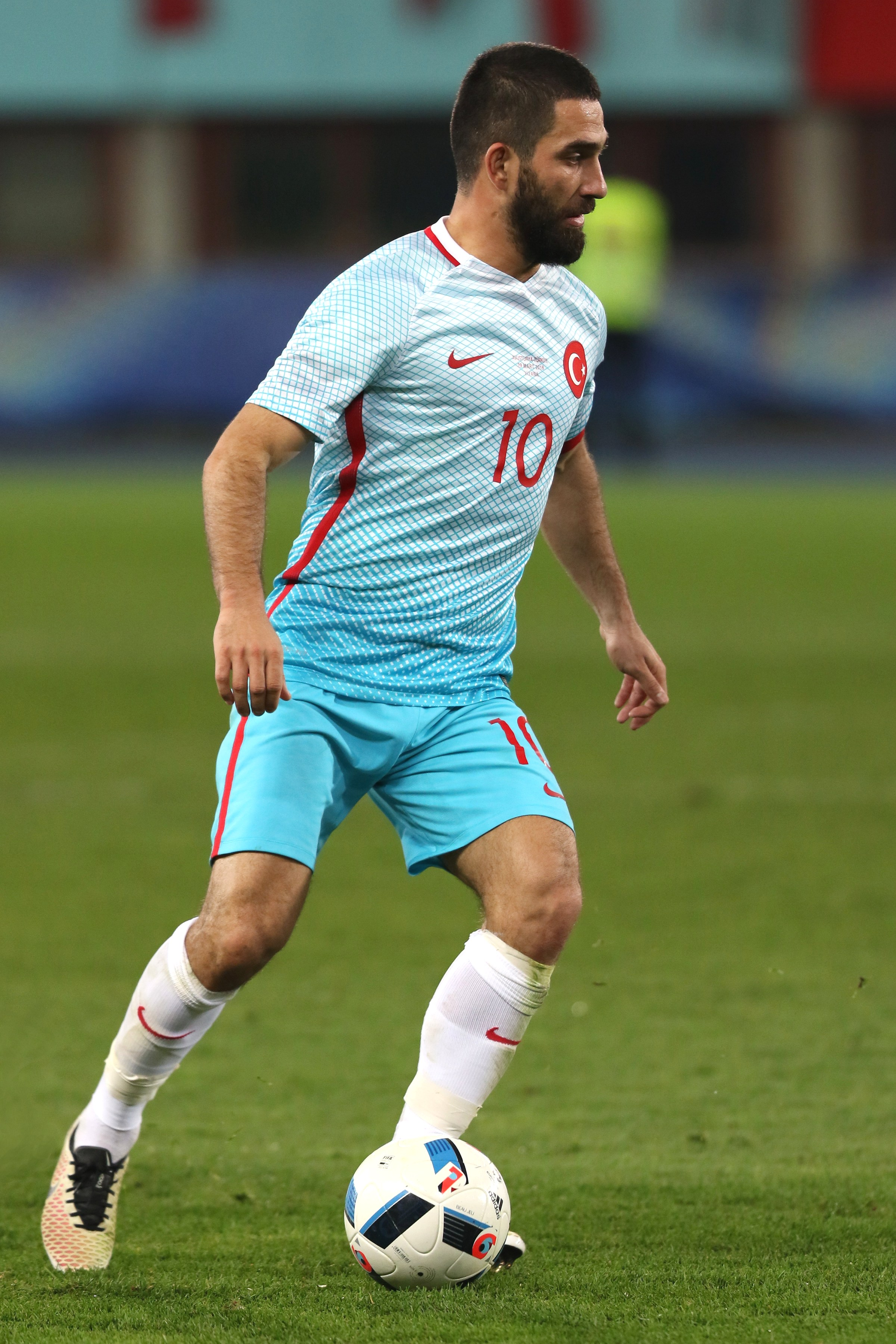
Turan with Turkey in 2016

Turkey
Year	Apps	Goals
2006	5	0
2007	9	0
2008	12	4
2009	9	1
2010	7	5
2011	8	2
2012	11	0
2013	10	1
2014	7	0
2015	9	3
2016	8	1
2017	5	0
Total	100	17

International goals

Turkey score listed first, score column indicates score after each Turan goal.

No.	Date	Venue	Opponent	Score	Result	Competition
1	25 May 2008	Ruhrstadion, Bochum, Germany	Uruguay	1–0	2–3	Friendly
2	11 June 2008	St. Jakob-Park, Basel, Switzerland	Switzerland	2–1	2–1	UEFA Euro 2008
3	15 June 2008	Stade de Genève, Geneve, Switzerland	Czech Republic	1–2	3–2	UEFA Euro 2008
4	11 October 2008	Inonu Stadium, Istanbul, Turkey	Bosnia and Herzegovina	1–1	2–1	2010 FIFA World Cup qualification
5	5 September 2009	Kadir Has Stadium, Kayseri, Turkey	Estonia	3–2	4–2	2010 FIFA World Cup qualification
6	22 May 2010	Red Bull Arena, New Jersey, United States	Czech Republic	1–0	2–1	Friendly
7	29 May 2010	Lincoln Financial Field, Philadelphia, United States	United States	1–0	1–2	Friendly
8	11 August 2010	Şükrü Saracoğlu Stadium, Istanbul, Turkey	Romania	2–0	2–0	Friendly
9	3 September 2010	Astana Arena, Astana, Kazakhstan	Kazakhstan	2–0	3–0	UEFA Euro 2012 qualifying
10	7 September 2010	Şükrü Saracoğlu Stadium, Istanbul, Turkey	Belgium	3–2	3–2	UEFA Euro 2012 qualifying
11	29 March 2011	Şükrü Saracoğlu Stadium, Istanbul, Turkey	Austria	1–0	2–0	UEFA Euro 2012 qualifying
12	2 September 2011	Türk Telekom Arena, Istanbul, Turkey	Kazakhstan	2–1	2–1	UEFA Euro 2012 qualifying
13	6 September 2013	Kadir Has Stadium, Kayseri, Turkey	Andorra	5-0	5-0	2014 FIFA World Cup qualification
14	12 June 2015	Astana Arena, Astana, Kazakhstan	Kazakhstan	1–0	1–0	UEFA Euro 2016 qualifying
15	6 September 2015	Torku Arena, Konya, Turkey	Netherlands	2–0	3–0	UEFA Euro 2016 qualifying
16	13 November 2015	Abdullah bin Khalifa Stadium, Doha, Qatar	Qatar	1–1	2–1	Friendly
17	29 March 2016	Ernst Happel Stadium, Vienna, Austria	Austria	2–1	2–1	Friendly

== Managerial statistics ==
As of match played 20 November 2026

Managerial record by team and tenure
Team	Nat	From	To	Record							
Team	Nat	From	To	G	W	D	L	GF	GA	GD	Win %
Eyüpspor	(Turkey)	14 April 2023	25 May 2025	84	45	14	25	143	94	+49	53.57
Shakhtar Donetsk	(Ukraine)	27 May 2025	present	71	45	16	10	142	52	+90	63.38
Total				155	90	30	35	285	146	+139	58.06

== Honours ==
=== Player ===
Galatasaray

- Süper Lig: 2007–08
- Turkish Cup: 2004–05

Atlético Madrid

- La Liga: 2013–14
- Copa del Rey: 2012–13
- UEFA Europa League: 2011–12
- UEFA Super Cup: 2012
- UEFA Champions League runner-up: 2013–14

Barcelona

- La Liga: 2015–16
- Copa del Rey: 2015–16, 2016–17
- Supercopa de España: 2016

İstanbul Başakşehir

- Süper Lig: 2019–20

Turkey

- UEFA European Championship third place: 2008

=== Manager ===
Eyüpspor

- TFF First League: 2023–24

Shakhtar Donetsk

- Ukrainian Premier League: 2025–26

Individual

- SportArena Coach of the Round: 2025–26 (Round 11)
- Ukrainian Premier League Coach of the Round: 2025–26 (Round 11),

== See also ==
- List of footballers with 100 or more caps
- List of Turkey international footballers
- List of foreign La Liga players

Sporting positions
Preceded by Ümit Karan	Galatasaray captain 2009–2011	Succeeded by Sabri Sarıoğlu
