= Numan Okumuş =

Turkish footballer

Personal information
- Date of birth: 2 November 1939 (age 86)

International career
| Years | Team | Apps | (Gls) |
| 1965 | Turkey | 2 | (0) |

Numan Okumuş (born 2 November 1939) is a Turkish footballer. He played in two matches for the Turkey national football team in 1965.
