= Şanver Göymen =

Turkish footballer

Şanver Göymen (born 22 January 1967 in Samsun) is a former Turkish football goalkeeper.

== Career ==
=== Club ===
His first football club was Samsunspor PAF. He became professional at Merizfonspor in 1990. He played for Denizlispor (1991–1993), Altay Izmir (1993–1998). Galatasaray SK wanted to transfer him, but he decided to stay by Altay.

He also played for Konyaspor (1998–1999), Çanakkale Dardanelspor (1999–2001) and Vestel Manisaspor in 2001.

=== International ===
He played for the Turkey national football team and was a participant at the 1996 UEFA European Championship.

=== Coaching ===
He retired in 2002. After his retirement, he made goalkeeper coach in Karşıyaka, Aydınspor, Altay and South African side Golden Arrows.
