= 1946–47 Istanbul Football League =

Istanbul Football League
- Season: 1946–47
- Champions: Fenerbahçe SK (11th title)

The 1946–47 İstanbul Football League season was the 39th season of the league. Fenerbahçe SK won the league for the 11th time.

== Season ==
Pos	Team	Pld	W	D	L	GF	GA	GD	Pts
1	Fenerbahçe SK	14	9	3	2	33	14	+19	35
2	Vefa SK	14	10	1	3	36	18	+18	35
3	Beşiktaş JK	14	9	2	3	38	14	+24	34
4	Galatasaray SK	14	5	6	3	23	22	+1	30
5	Küçükçekmece SK	14	5	5	4	25	26	−1	29
6	Beykoz 1908 S.K.D.	14	3	4	7	13	22	−9	24
7	Kasımpaşa SK	14	1	5	8	22	23	−1	21
8	Beyoğlu SK	14	0	2	12	12	53	−41	16
