= Yavuz Çoker =

Turkish footballer

Personal information
- Date of birth: 1936 (age 89–90)
- Position: Defender

International career
Years	Team	Apps	(Gls)
1965	Turkey	1	(0)

Yavuz Çoker (born 1936) is a Turkish footballer. He played in one match for the Turkey national football team in 1965.
