= Erbil Uzel =

Turkish footballer

Personal information
- Date of birth: 15 April 1974 (age 52)
- Place of birth: Kırklareli, Turkey
- Position: Defender

Senior career*
Years	Team	Apps	(Gls)
1990–1992	Kırklarelispor		
1992–1993	Beylerbeyi		
1993–1994	Aydınspor		
1994–1996	Karşıyaka		
1996–1999	Sarıyer		
1999–2002	Adanaspor		
2002–2005	Sarıyer		

International career
1996	Turkey	1	(0)

Managerial career
- 2014–2015: Sarıyer (youth)
- 2016: Sarıyer (assistant)
- 2017–2018: Sarıyer (assistant)
- 2018: Sarıyer (caretaker)
- * Club domestic league appearances and goals

Erbil Uzel (born 15 April 1974) is a retired Turkish football defender who played one game for the Turkey national football team in 1996.
