= Selahattin Torkal =

Turkish footballer

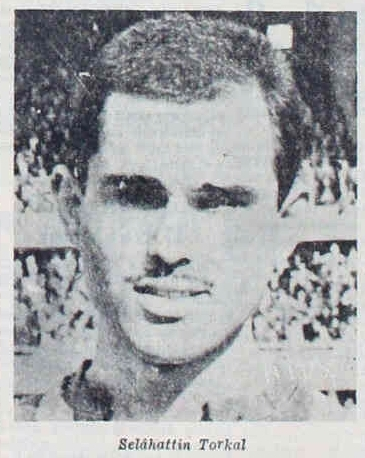
- 1950

Personal information
- Date of birth: 1925
- Place of birth: Istanbul, Turkey
- Date of death: 16 November 2010 (aged 84–85)
- Place of death: Istanbul, Turkey

International career
| Years | Team | Apps | (Gls) |
- Turkey

Selahattin Torkal (1925 – 16 November 2010) was a Turkish footballer. He competed in the men's tournament at the 1948 Summer Olympics.
