= Hüseyin Saygun =

Turkish footballer

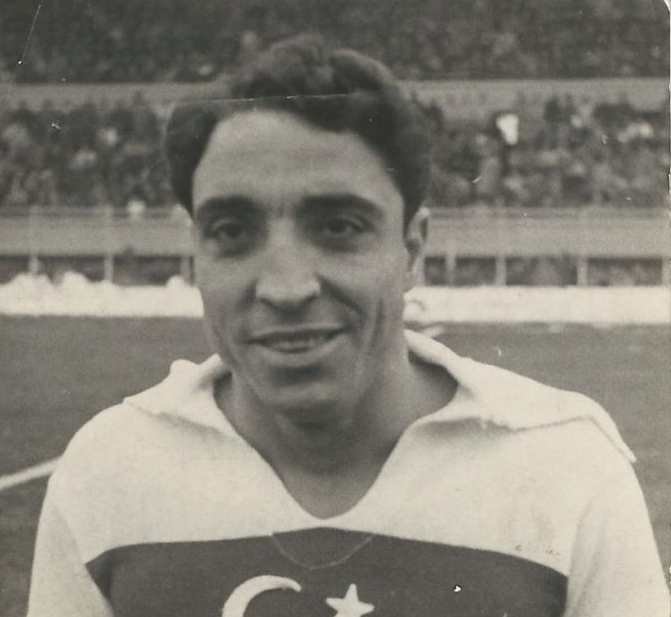

Personal information
- Date of birth: 1920
- Place of birth: Istanbul, Ottoman Empire
- Date of death: 31 March 1993 (aged 72–73)

International career
Years	Team	Apps	(Gls)
- Turkey

Hüseyin Saygun (1920 – 31 March 1993) was a Turkish footballer. He competed in the men's tournament at the 1948 Summer Olympics.

== Individual ==
- Beşiktaş J.K. Squads of Century (Silver Team)
