= Mehmet Reşat Nayır =

Turkish footballer

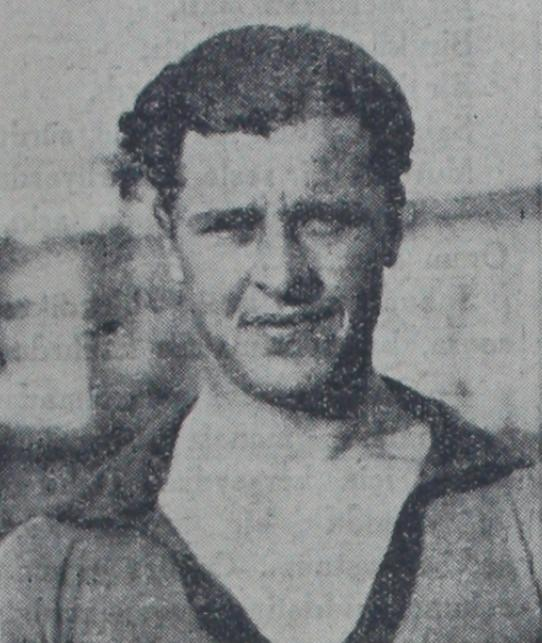
- Mehmet Reşat Nayır in 1931

Personal information
- Date of birth: 13 July 1911
- Date of death: 25 October 1992 (aged 81)

International career
Years	Team	Apps	(Gls)
- Turkey

Mehmet Reşat Nayır (13 July 1911 – 25 October 1992) was a Turkish footballer. He competed in the men's tournament at the 1936 Summer Olympics.
