= Faruk Sağnak =

Turkish footballer and manager

Personal information
- Full name: Faruk Sağnak
- Date of birth: 19 February 1924
- Place of birth: Istanbul, Turkey
- Date of death: 24 February 2012 (aged 88)
- Positions: Defender; midfielder; left winger

Senior career*
Years	Team	Apps	(Gls)
1943–1955	Beşiktaş	115	(13)
Total		115	(13)

International career
1951	Turkey	2	(0)
- * Club domestic league appearances and goals

Faruk Sağnak (1 January 1924 – 23 February 2012) was a Turkish international footballer and manager. He died on 23 February 2012.

Sağnak was a one-club-man, played his entire career at Beşiktaş J.K. between 1943 and 1955.
