= 1987–88 Galatasaray S.K. season =

Galatasaray
1987–88 season
- President: (Turkey) Ali Tanrıyar
- Manager: (Turkey) Mustafa Denizli
- Stadium: Ali Sami Yen Stadı
- 1. Lig: 1st
- Türkiye Kupası: 4th round
- European Cup: 1st Round
- Süper Kupa: Winner
- Top goalscorer: League: Tanju Çolak (39); All: Tanju Çolak (46)
- Highest home attendance: 35,505 vs Fenerbahçe SK (1. Lig, 25 October 1987)
- Lowest home attendance: 7,195 vs Kayserispor (Türkiye Kupası, 24 February 1988)
- Average home league attendance: 29,034
Home colours	Away colours

The 1987–88 season was Galatasaray's 84th in existence and the 30th consecutive season in the 1. Lig. This article shows statistics of the club's players in the season, and also lists all matches that the club have played in the season.

== Squad statistics ==
No.	Pos.	Name	1. Lig		Türkiye Kupası		CL		Süper Kupa		Total	
No.	Pos.	Name	Apps	Goals	Apps	Goals	Apps	Goals	Apps	Goals	Apps	Goals
-	GK	(Socialist Federal Republic of Yugoslavia) Zoran Simović	33	0	2	0	2	0	1	0	38	0
-	GK	(Turkey) Hayrettin Demirbaş	5	0	2	0	0	0	0	0	7	0
-	DF	(Turkey) Semih Yuvakuran	37	1	4	0	2	0	1	0	44	1
-	DF	(Turkey) Cüneyt Tanman (C)	27	2	0	0	2	0	1	0	30	2
-	DF	(Turkey) İsmail Demiriz	33	1	4	0	1	0	1	0	39	1
-	DF	(Turkey) İhsan Okay	1	0	2	0	0	0	0	0	3	0
-	DF	(Turkey) Raşit Çetiner	1	0	0	0	0	0	0	0	1	0
-	DF	(Turkey) Bülent Korkmaz	0	0	1	0	0	0	0	0	1	0
-	DF	(Iran) Naser Sadeghi	1	0	0	0	0	0	0	0	1	0
-	DF	(Turkey) Yusuf Altıntaş	27	2	2	0	2	0	1	0	32	2
-	DF	(Turkey) Erhan Önal	34	3	2	0	2	0	1	0	39	3
-	MF	(Turkey) Savaş Koç	10	0	0	0	1	0	0	0	11	0
-	MF	(Turkey) Muhammet Altıntaş	32	1	3	0	2	0	0	0	37	0
-	MF	(Turkey) Tugay Kerimoğlu	4	0	2	0	0	0	0	0	6	0
-	MF	(Turkey) Savaş Demiral	23	0	4	0	1	0	0	0	25	0
-	MF	(Turkey) Arif Kocabıyık	26	0	3	0	1	0	1	0	31	0
-	MF	(Socialist Federal Republic of Yugoslavia) Xhevat Prekazi	33	14	4	0	2	0	1	0	4	14
-	FW	(Turkey) İlyas Tüfekçi	28	6	3	2	1	0	0	0	32	8
-	FW	(Socialist Federal Republic of Yugoslavia) Mersad Kovačević	32	8	3	2	2	0	1	1	38	11
-	FW	(France) Didier Six	22	2	2	1	0	0	0	0	24	3
-	FW	(Turkey) Tanju Çolak	38	39	4	5	2	1	1	1	45	46
-	FW	(Turkey) Uğur Tütüneker	33	5	2	1	2	0	1	0	38	6

=== Players in / out ===
==== In ====
Pos.	Nat.	Name	Age	Moving from
FW	(Turkey)	Tanju Çolak	25	Samsunspor
MF	(Turkey)	Savaş Demiral	26	Samsunspor
FW	(France)	Didier Six	33	Valenciennes FC
MF	(Turkey)	Tugay Kerimoğlu	17	Galatasaray A2
DF	(Turkey)	Bülent Korkmaz	19	Galatasaray A2
DF	(Turkey)	İhsan Okay	18	Galatasaray A2

==== Out ====
Pos.	Nat.	Name	Age	Moving to
DF	(Turkey)	Ahmet Ceyhan	36	Career end
MF	(Turkey)	Adnan Esen	26	Zonguldak
FW	(Turkey)	Bülent Alkılıç (loan)	25	Karşıyaka SK
FW	(Turkey)	Erkan Ültanır (loan)	22	Karşıyaka SK
MF	(Turkey)	Suat Kaya	20	Konyaspor
MF	(Turkey)	Tuncay Soyak	28	Gençlerbirliği SK
MF	(Iran)	Naser Sadeghi		Samsunspor

== 1. Lig ==
=== Standings ===
Pos	Team	Pld	W	D	L	GF	GA	GD	Pts	Qualification or relegation
1	Galatasaray (C)	38	27	9	2	86	35	+51	90	Qualification to European Cup first round
2	Beşiktaş	38	22	12	4	68	29	+39	78	Qualification to UEFA Cup first round
3	Malatyaspor	38	17	11	10	64	61	+3	62	Invitation to Balkans Cup
4	Samsunspor	38	17	9	12	43	41	+2	60	
5	Bursaspor	38	17	6	15	63	56	+7	57	

Rules for classification: 1) points; 2) goal difference; 3) number of goals scored.
(C) Champions

=== Matches ===
Kick-off listed in local time (EET)

16 August 1987 1	Eskişehirspor	0–1	Galatasaray SK	Eskişehir
17:30 EET		(Report)	Xhevat Prekazi 28'	Stadium: Eskişehir Atatürk Stadı; Referee: İlyas Ayan

29 August 1987 2	Galatasaray SK	3–1	Sakaryaspor	Istanbul
17:00 EET	Tanju Çolak 11', 39'; Yusuf Altıntaş 86'	(Report)	Sinan Turhan 89'	Stadium: Ali Sami Yen Stadı; Attendance: 34,812; Referee: Ahmet Akçay

12 September 1987 3	Galatasaray SK	5–0	Rizespor	Istanbul
16:30 EET	Mersad Kovačević 7', 35'; İlyas Tüfekçi 14'; Uğur Tütüneker 30'; Tanju Çolak 76'	(Report)		Stadium: Ali Sami Yen Stadı; Attendance: 34,539; Referee: Necmi Temizel

20 September 1987 4	Galatasaray SK	3–1	Zonguldakspor	Istanbul
16:30 EET	Tanju Çolak 52', 82'; İlyas Tüfekçi 71'	(Report)	Hamit Yüksel 85'	Stadium: Ali Sami Yen Stadı; Attendance: 35,327; Referee: İbrahim Acar

26 September 1987 5	Sarıyer G.K.	1–1	Galatasaray SK	Istanbul
16:00 EET	Erdal Keser 77'	(Report)	Erhan Önal 80'	Stadium: Ali Sami Yen Stadı; Attendance: 35,051; Referee: Yüksel Okçuoğlu

4 October 1987 6	Galatasaray SK	5–2	Bursaspor	Istanbul
15:00 EET	Tanju Çolak 11' (pen.), 26'; Cüneyt Tanman 24'; Xhevat Prekazi 37'; Erhan Önal 44'	(Report)	Nenad Bijedić 23'; Şenol Ulusavaş 69'	Stadium: Ali Sami Yen Stadı; Attendance: 34,440; Referee: İlyas Ayan

10 October 1987 7	Galatasaray SK	3–1	MKE Ankaragücü	Istanbul
15:00 EET	Xhevat Prekazi 14', 88'; Tanju Çolak 31'	(Report)	Ziya Doğan 60'	Stadium: Ali Sami Yen Stadı; Attendance: 32,635; Referee: Necmi Temizel

18 October 1987 8	Trabzonspor	2–3	Galatasaray SK	Trabzon
14:30 EET	Muhammet Altıntaş 40' (o.g.); Murat Şimşek 90'	(Report)	Tanju Çolak 50' (pen.), 79'; Xhevat Prekazi 55'	Stadium: Hüseyin Avni Aker Stadı; Referee: Sadık Deda

25 October 1987 9	Galatasaray SK	1–1	Fenerbahçe SK	Istanbul
15:00 EET	İlyas Tüfekçi 23'	(Report)	Şenol Çorlu 59'	Stadium: Ali Sami Yen Stadı; Attendance: 35,505; Referee: İhsan Türe

1 November 1987 10	Beşiktaş JK	2–2	Galatasaray SK	Istanbul
14:30 EET	Feyyaz Uçar 37'; Rıza Çalımbay 87'	(Report)	İlyas Demiriz 33'; Didier Six 79'	Stadium: İnönü Stadı; Attendance: 22,000; Referee: Sadık Deda

7 November 1987 11	Galatasaray SK	2–1	Gençlerbirliği SK	Istanbul
15:00 EET	Semih Yuvakuran 24'; Mersad Kovačević 72'	(Report)	Erhan İnan 84'	Stadium: Ali Sami Yen Stadı; Attendance: 22,093; Referee: Kazım Ünlüsoy

15 November 1987 12	Altay SK	1–2	Galatasaray SK	İzmir
14:00 EET	Miodrag Radovic 21'	(Report)	Mersad Kovačević 11'; Didier Six 40'	Stadium: İzmir Atatürk Stadium; Attendance: 59,406; Referee: İlyas Ayan

22 November 1987 13	Galatasaray SK	5–1	Kocaelispor	Istanbul
14:00 EET	Tanju Çolak 46', 67', 75', 82'; Mersad Kovačević 60'	(Report)	Engelbert Buschmann 58'	Stadium: Ali Sami Yen Stadı; Attendance: 29,636; Referee: Engin Kurt

28 November 1987 14	Samsunspor	1–0	Galatasaray SK	Samsunspor
13:00 EET	Mete Adanır 82'	(Report)		Stadium: Samsun 19 Mayıs Stadı; Referee: Erman Toroğlu

6 December 1987 15	Malatyaspor	3–1	Galatasaray SK	Malatya
13:00 EET	Oktay Çevik 48', 80'; Orhan Kapucu 58'	(Report)	İlyas Tüfekçi 84'	Stadium: Malatya İnönü Stadı; Referee: Coşkun Kutay

12 December 1987 16	Galatasaray SK	3–1	Denizlispor	Istanbul
14:00 EET	Muhammet Altıntaş 11'; Tanju Çolak 40', 73'	(Report)	Hüseyin Şengül 26'	Stadium: Ali Sami Yen Stadı; Attendance: 19,380; Referee: Kazım Ünlüsoy

20 December 1987 17	Karşıyaka SK	1–2	Galatasaray SK	İzmir
14:00 EET	Rıza Tuyuran 3'	(Report)	İlyas Tüfekçi 65'; Tanju Çolak 87'	Stadium: İzmir Atatürk Stadium; Attendance: 35,670; Referee: Necmi Temizel

27 December 1987 18	Galatasaray SK	3–0	Adana Demirspor	Istanbul
14:00 EET	Tanju Çolak 52' (pen.), 77', 81' (pen.)	(Report)		Stadium: Ali Sami Yen Stadı; Attendance: 29,508; Referee: Ahmet Akçay

3 January 1988 19	Boluspor	1–1	Galatasaray SK	Bolu
15:00 EET	Şenol Fidan 47'	(Report)	İlyas Tüfekçi 88'	Stadium: Bolu Atatürk Stadı; Referee: Sadık Deda

24 January 1988 20	Galatasaray SK	1–1	Eskişehir	Istanbul
14:00 EET	Tanju Çolak 45' (pen.)	(Report)	Yusuf Yazıcı 59'	Stadium: Ali Sami Yen Stadı; Attendance: 23,019; Referee: Hasan Ceylan

31 January 1988 21	Sakaryaspor	0–2	Galatasaray SK	Adapazarı
14:00 EET		(Report)	Tanju Çolak 22'; Selçuk Yiğitlik 83' (o.g.)	Stadium: Adapazarı Atatürk Stadı; Referee: Oğuz Sarvan

7 February 1988 22	Rizespor	0–1	Galatasaray SK	Rize
13:30 EET		(Report)	Cüneyt Tanman 17'	Stadium: Rize Atatürk Stadı; Referee: Kazım Ünlüsoy

14 February 1988 23	Zonguldakspor	1–2	Galatasaray SK	Zonguldak
14:00 EET	İsmail Hakkı Yılmaz 84'	(Report)	Tanju Çolak 18', 75'	Stadium: Zonguldak Atatürk Stadı; Referee: Engin Kurt

20 February 1988 24	Galatasaray SK	2–2	Sarıyer G.K.	Istanbul
14:00 EET	Tanju Çolak 37' (pen.); Xhevat Prekazi 73'	(Report)	Sercan Görgülü 6'; Selçuk Yula 40'	Stadium: Ali Sami Yen Stadı; Attendance: 34,873; Referee: Yahya Diker

28 February 1988 25	Bursaspor	1 –1	Galatasaray SK	Bursa
14:00 EET	Çetin Kahraman 44'	(Report)	Tanju Çolak 71'	Stadium: Bursa Atatürk Stadı; Referee: Necmi Temizel

5 March 1988 26	MKE Ankaragücü	2–2	Galatasaray SK	Ankara
14:30 EET	Mustafa Gölpınar 25'; Haluk Turfan 48'	(Report)	Tanju Çolak 4'; Mersad Kovačević 72'	Stadium: Ankara 19 Mayıs Stadı; Referee: Oğuz Sarvan

13 March 1988 27	Galatasaray SK	2–1	Trabzonspor	Istanbul
14:30 EET	Tanju Çolak 31' (pen.), 65'	(Report)	Aykut Canik 74'	Stadium: Ali Sami Yen Stadı; Attendance: 33,273; Referee: Coşkun Kutay

19 March 1988 28	Fenerbahçe SK	1–2	Galatasaray SK	Istanbul
14:30 EET	Erdi Demir 20'	(Report)	Xhevat Prekazi 66'; Uğur Tütüneker 88'	Stadium: Fenerbahçe Stadı; Attendance: 21,477; Referee: İhsan Türe

27 March 1988 29	Galatasaray SK	0–0	Beşiktaş JK	Istanbul
15:30 EET		(Report)		Stadium: Ali Sami Yen Stadı; Attendance: 26,999; Referee: Erman Toroğlu

3 March 1988 30	Gençlerbirliği SK	1–2	Galatasaray SK	Ankara
15:30 EET	Muammer Nurlu 54'	(Report)	Tanju Çolak 4'; Mersad Kovačević 33'	Stadium: Ankara 19 Mayıs Stadı; Referee: Oğuz Sarvan

10 April 1988 31	Galatasaray SK	5–1	Altay SK	Istanbul
15:30 EET	Mersad Kovačević 11'; Tanju Çolak 13', 67'; Xhevat Prekazi 44', 69'	(Report)	Hakan Yalçın 61'	Stadium: Ali Sami Yen Stadı; Attendance: 18,603; Referee: Kazım Ünlüsoy

17 April 1988 32	Kocaelispor	1–2	Galatasaray SK	Kocaeli
15:30 EET	engelbert Buschmann 83'	(Report)	Xhevat Prekazi 10'; Murat Vatansever 38' (o.g.)	Stadium: İsmet Paşa Stadı; Referee: Necmi Temizel

24 April 1988 33	Galatasaray SK	3–0	Samsunspor	Istanbul
15:00 EET	Tanju Çolak 18', 34' (pen.); Xhevat Prekazi 63'	(Report)		Stadium: Ali Sami Yen Stadı; Attendance: 29,585; Referee: Yavuz Karaozan

30 April 1988 34	Galatasaray SK	3–1	Malatyaspor	Istanbul
15:00 EET	Xhevat Prekazi 27'; Tanju Çolak 45'; Erhan Önal 49'	(Report)	İsmail Akbaşlı 58'	Stadium: Ali Sami Yen Stadı; Attendance: 19,309; Referee: Sadık Deda

8 May 1988 35	Denizlispor	1–2	Galatasaray SK	Istanbul
15:00 EET	Ali Yalçın 80'	(Report)	Tanju Çolak 42' (pen.); Yusuf Altıntaş 44'	Stadium: Ali Sami Yen Stadı; Referee: Erman Toroğlu

15 May 1988 36	Galatasaray SK	2–0	Karşıyaka SK	Istanbul
15:00 EET	Tanju Çolak 15'; Xhevat Prekazi 46'	(Report)		Stadium: Ali Sami Yen Stadı; Attendance: 23,114; Referee: Coşkun Kutay

22 May 1988 37	Adanaspor	0–5	Galatasaray SK	Adana
15:00 EET		(Report)	Tanju Çolak 22', 54'; Xhevat Prekazi 42'; Uğur Tütüneker 82', 89'	Stadium: Adana Atatürk Stadı; Referee: Tahsin Kesiciler

29 May 1988 38	Galatasaray SK	1–0	Boluspor	Istanbul
15:00 EET	Uğur Tütüneker 66'	(Report)		Stadium: Ali Sami Yen Stadı; Attendance: 50,000; Referee: Özcan Oal

== Türkiye Kupası ==
Kick-off listed in local time (EET)

=== 3rd round ===
10 February 1988 1	Kayserispor	1–5	Galatasaray SK	Kayseri
13:30 EET	Namık 86'	(Report)	İlyas Tüfekçi 9', 74'; Tanju Çolak 60', 65'; Didier Six 83'	Stadium: Kayseri Atatürk Stadı; Referee: Burhan Koçak

24 February 1988 2	Galatasaray SK	4–1	Kayserispor	Istanbul
13:00 EET	Mersad Kovačević 9'; Tanju Çolak 60', 63', 66'	(Report)	Alaaddin Demirözü 15'	Stadium: Ali Sami Yen Stadı; Attendance: 7,195; Referee: Metin Tokat

=== 4th round ===
9 March 1988 1	MKE Ankaragücü	2–1	Galatasaray SK	Ankara
13:30 EET	Savaş Koç 24'; Haluk Turfan 76'	(Report)	Uğur Tütüneker 63'	Stadium: Ankara 19 Mayıs Stadı; Attendance: 18,588; Referee: Engin Kurt

23 March 1988 2	Galatasaray SK	1–3	MKE Ankaragücü	Istanbul
13:30 EET	Mersad Kovačević 50'	(Report)	Hayati Soydaş 73'; Rıfat Benli 78'; Ziya Doğan 83'	Stadium: Ali Sami Yen Stadı; Attendance: 11,830; Referee: Ahmet Akçay

== European Cup ==
=== 1st round ===
16 September 1987 1	PSV Eindhoven	3–0	Galatasaray SK	Eindhoven
21:45 EET	Hans Gillhaus 56'; Ronald Koeman 75'; Adick Koot 89'	(Report)		Stadium: Philips Stadion; Referee: (Portugal) Jose Rosa Dos Santos

30 September 1987 2	Galatasaray SK	2–0	PSV Eindhoven	Istanbul
21:45 EET	Tanju Çolak 5'; Berry van Aerle 42' (o.g.)	(Report)		Stadium: Ali Sami Yen Stadı; Attendance: 25,402; Referee: (Hungary) Lajos Nemeth

== Süper Kupa-Cumhurbaşkanlığı Kupası ==
Kick-off listed in local time (EET)

5 June 1988 1	Galatasaray SK	2–0	Sakaryaspor	Ankara
17:00 EET	Mersad Kovačević 10'; Tanju Çolak 18'	(Report)		Stadium: 19 Mayıs Stadı; Attendance: 19,845; Referee: Yusuf Namoğlu

== Friendly Matches ==
Kick-off listed in local time (EET)

=== TSYD Kupası ===
5 August 1987 1	Beşiktaş JK	2–1	Galatasaray SK	Istanbul
18:00 EET	Saffet Sancaklı 74'; Feyyaz Uçar 88'	(Report)	Tanju Çolak 9'	Stadium: Ali Sami Yen Stadı; Referee: Erman Toroğlu

8 August 1987 2	Galatasaray SK	3–2	Fenerbahçe SK	Istanbul
18:00 EET	Tanju Çolak 16', 82' (pen.); Mersad Kovačević 70'	(Report)	Nezihi Tosuncuk 57'; Kayhan Kaynak 78'	Stadium: Fenerbahçe Stadı; Attendance: 31,500; Referee: İbrahim Aksoy

== Attendance ==
Competition	Av. Att.	Total Att.
1. Lig	29,034	551,650
Türkiye Kupası	9,513	19,025
European Cup	25,402	25,402
Total	27,094	596,077
