= 1988–89 Galatasaray S.K. season =

Galatasaray
1988–89 season
- President: (Turkey) Ali Tanrıyar
- Manager: (Turkey) Mustafa Denizli
- Stadium: Ali Sami Yen Stadı
- Süper Lig: 3rd
- Turkish Cup: 1/4 Final
- European Cup: Semi Final
- Top goalscorer: League: Tanju Çolak (27); All: Tanju Çolak (38)
- Highest home attendance: 60,000 vs AS Monaco (European Cup, 15 March 1989)
- Lowest home attendance: 5,848 vs Ayvalıkgücü (Turkish Cup, 1 February 1989)
- Average home league attendance: 19,034
Home colours	Away colours	Third colours

The 1988–89 season was Galatasaray's 85th in existence and the 31st consecutive season in the 1. Lig. This article shows statistics of the club's players in the season, and also lists all matches that the club have played in the season.

== Squad statistics ==
No.	Pos.	Name	1. Lig		Turkish Cup		CL		Total	
No.	Pos.	Name	Apps	Goals	Apps	Goals	Apps	Goals	Apps	Goals
-	GK	(Socialist Federal Republic of Yugoslavia) Zoran Simović	30	1	6	0	8	0	44	1
-	GK	(Turkey) Hayrettin Demirbaş	6	0	0	0	0	0	6	0
-	DF	(Turkey) Semih Yuvakuran	32	1	4	1	8	0	44	2
-	DF	(Turkey) Cüneyt Tanman (C)	34	1	6	1	8	2	48	4
-	DF	(Turkey) İsmail Demiriz	26	2	6	0	8	0	40	2
-	DF	(Turkey) İhsan Okay	1	0	0	0	0	0	1	0
-	DF	(Turkey) Bülent Korkmaz	10	0	1	0	7	0	18	0
-	DF	(Turkey) Yusuf Altıntaş	20	3	5	0	5	0	30	3
-	DF	(Turkey) Erhan Önal	26	1	6	0	6	0	38	1
-	MF	(Turkey) Savaş Koç	29	5	5	1	5	0	39	6
-	MF	(Turkey) Muhammet Altıntaş	12	0	0	0	3	0	15	0
-	MF	(Turkey) Tugay Kerimoğlu	16	0	4	0	1	0	21	0
-	MF	(Turkey) Savaş Demiral	21	0	1	0	6	1	28	1
-	MF	(Turkey) Metin Yıldız	20	0	1	1	4	0	25	1
-	MF	(Turkey) Arif Kocabıyık	20	1	2	0	5	0	27	1
-	MF	(Socialist Federal Republic of Yugoslavia) Xhevat Prekazi	28	3	5	0	8	1	41	4
-	FW	(Turkey) İlyas Tüfekçi	19	5	2	0	3	0	24	5
-	FW	(Socialist Federal Republic of Yugoslavia) Mersad Kovačević	30	12	5	1	5	0	40	13
-	FW	(Turkey) Tanju Çolak	34	27	5	6	6	5	45	38
-	FW	(Turkey) Uğur Tütüneker	32	9	5	4	7	2	44	15

=== Players in / out ===
==== In ====
Pos.	Nat.	Name	Age	Moving from
FW	(Turkey)	Metin Yıldız	28	Malatyaspor

==== Out ====
Pos.	Nat.	Name	Age	Moving to
DF	(Turkey)	Raşit Çetiner	32	career end
FW	(France)	Didier Six	34	Stade Vallauris
FW	(Turkey)	Erkan Ültanır (on loan)	24	Bursaspor

== 1. Lig ==
=== Standings ===
Pos	Team	Pld	W	D	L	GF	GA	GD	Pts	Qualification or relegation
1	Fenerbahçe (C)	36	29	6	1	103	27	+76	93	Qualification to European Cup first round
2	Beşiktaş	36	25	8	3	81	21	+60	83	Qualification to Cup Winners' Cup first round
3	Galatasaray	36	20	9	7	76	31	+45	69	Qualification to UEFA Cup first round
4	Sarıyer	36	21	5	10	70	43	+27	68	
5	Trabzonspor	36	19	7	10	59	38	+21	64	

Rules for classification: 1) points; 2) goal difference; 3) number of goals scored.
(C) Champions

=== Matches ===
21 August 1988 1	Galatasaray	4–1	Karşıyaka	Istanbul
16:15 EET	Tanju Çolak 18', 59' (pen.); İlyas Tüfekçi 40', 76'	(Report)	Cevdet Çapar 51'	Stadium: Ali Sami Yen Stadı; Attendance: 13,000; Referee: Sadık Deda

28 August 1988 2	Sakaryaspor	1–3	Galatasaray	Sakarya
16:00 EET	Kemal Yıldırım 25'	(Report)	Uğur Tüteneker 35'; Tanju Çolak 52'; İlyas Tüfekçi 68'	Stadium: Adapazarı Atatürk Stadı; Referee: Erman Toroğlu

3 September 1988 3	Galatasaray	6–0	Malatyaspor	Istanbul
16:00 EET	Tanju Çolak 6'; Mersad Kovačević 45', 53'; İlyas Tüfekçi 67'; Xhevat Prekazi 84'; Uğur Tütüneker 87'	(Report)		Stadium: Ali Sami Yen Stadı; Attendance: 34,812; Referee: Ahmet Akçay

11 September 1988 4	Boluspor	0–0	Galatasaray	Bolu
16:00 EET		(Report)		Stadium: Bolu Atatürk Stadı; Referee: Engin Kurt

17 September 1988 5	Galatasaray	7–3	Adanaspor	Istanbul
16:00 EET	Tanju Çolak 8', 60', 67', 76' (pen.); Mersad Kovačević 48', 88' İsmail Demiriz 50'	(Report)	İsmail Demiriz 34' (o.g.); Osman Özdemir 66' (pen.); Ali Beykoz 89'	Stadium: Ali Sami Yen Stadı; Attendance: 17,393; Referee: Hasan Ceylan

24 September 1988 6	Fenerbahçe SK	1–0	Galatasaray	Istanbul
15:30 EET	Rıdvan Dilmen 31'	(Report)		Stadium: Fenerbahçe Stadı; Attendance: 25,869; Referee: Sadık Deda

1 October 1988 7	Galatasaray	2–1	Bursaspor	Istanbul
14:30 EET	Yalçın Gündüz 38' (o.g.); Arif Kocabıyık 44'	(Report)	Nenad Bijedić 55'	Stadium: Ali Sami Yen Stadı; Attendance: 21,523; Referee: Aykan Köseoğlu

15 October 1988 8	Galatasaray	1–2	Sarıyer G.K.	Istanbul
14:30 EET	Uğur Tütüneker 55'	(Report)	Selçuk Yula 57' (pen.); Cengiz Güzeltepe 81'	Stadium: Ali Sami Yen Stadı; Attendance: 28,932; Referee: İhsan Türe

29 October 1988 9	Galatasaray	2–1	Altay SK	Istanbul
14:30 EET	Tanju Çolak 40'; Savaş Koç 42'	(Report)	Ramazan Torunoğlu 55'	Stadium: Ali Sami Yen Stadı; Attendance: 9,034; Referee: Burhan Koçak

15 November 1988 10	Kahramanmaraşspor	1–1	Galatasaray	Kahramanmaraş
15:00 EET	Serdar Yılmaz 61'	(Report)	Tümer Uzun 41' (o.g.)	Stadium: Kahramanmaraş 12 Şubat Stadı; Referee: Erman Toroğlu

13 November 1988 11	Galatasaray	4–0	Samsunspor	Istanbul
15:00 EET	Tanju Çolak 3', 14' (pen.); Uğur Tütüneker 28'; Mersad Kovačević 64'	(Report)		Stadium: Ali Sami Yen Stadı; Attendance: 13,612; Referee: Oğuz Sarvan

20 November 1988 12	Adana Demirspor	0–0	Galatasaray	Adana
13:30 EET		(Report)		Stadium: Adana 5 Ocak Stadı; Referee: Sadık Deda

4 December 1988 13	Galatasaray	2–0	Trabzonspor	Istanbul
14:00 EET	Mersad Kovačević 69', 89'	(Report)		Stadium: Ali Sami Yen Stadı; Attendance: 34,344; Referee: Engin Kurt

7 December 1988 14	Rizespor	1–3	Galatasaray	Rize
13:30 EET	Muharrem Vezir 31'	(Report)	Tanju Çolak 35', 81' (pen.); Uğur Tütüneker 53'	Stadium: Rize Atatürk Stadı; Referee: Hasan Ceylan

11 December 1988 15	MKE Ankaragücü	0–1	Galatasaray	Ankara
13:30 EET		(Report)	Uğur Tütüneker	Stadium: Ankara 19 Mayıs Stadı; Referee: Sadık Deda

17 December 1988 16	Galatasaray	1–4	Beşiktaş JK	Istanbul
14:00 EET	Uğur Tütüneker 5'	(Report)	Feyyaz Uçar 14', 85', 90'; Zeki Önatlı 70'	Stadium: Ali Sami Yen Stadı; Attendance: 24,324; Referee: İhsan Türe

25 December 1988 17	Eskişehirspor	1–1	Galatasaray	Istanbul
13:30 EET	Adnan Mededovic 15'	(Report)	Tanju Çolak 90'	Stadium: Ali Sami Yen Stadı; Referee: Oğuz Sarvan

31 December 1988 18	Konyaspor	1–0	Galatasaray	Konya
12:30 EET	Suat Kaya 66'	(Report)		Stadium: Konya Atatürk Stadı; Referee: Ahmet Akçay

22 January 1989 19	Karşıyaka SK	0–0	Galatasaray	İzmir
14:00 EET		(Report)		Stadium: İzmir Atatürk Stadium; Attendance: 55,000; Referee: Erman Toroğlu

28 January 1989 20	Galatasaray	1–1	Sakaryaspor	Istanbul
14:00 EET	Yusuf Altıntaş 69'	(Report)	Selçuk Yiğitlik 62'	Stadium: Ali Sami Yen Stadı; Attendance: 21,111; Referee: Ünal Ünal

5 February 1989 21	Malatyaspor	0–0	Galatasaray	Malatya
13:30 EET		(Report)		Stadium: Malatya İnönü Stadı; Referee: Yavuz Karaozan

12 February 1989 22	Galatasaray	4–0	Boluspor	Istanbul
15:00 EET	Tanju Çolak 35', 58' (pen.); Mersad Kovačević 39', 62'	(Report)		Stadium: Ali Sami Yen Stadı; Attendance: 22,822; Referee: Ahmet Akçay

19 February 1989 23	Adanaspor	0–0	Galatasaray	Adana
14:00 EET		(Report)		Stadium: Adana 5 Ocak Stadı; Referee: Tahsin Kesiciler

5 March 1989 24	Bursaspor	1–0	Galatasaray	Bursa
14:30 EET	Erkan Ültanır 81'	(Report)		Stadium: Bursa Atatürk Stadı; Referee: Ahmet Çakar

19 March 1989 25	Sarıyer G.K.	3–1	Galatasaray	Istanbul
14:30 EET	Erdal Keser 38'; Selçuk Yula 68'; Osman Yıldırım 78'	(Report)	Xhevat Prekazi 79'	Stadium: İnönü Stadı; Attendance: 19,118; Referee: Yahya Diker

25 March 1989 26	Galatasaray	2–0	Rizespor	Istanbul
12:30 EET	Tanju Çolak 51'; İlyas Tüfekçi	(Report)		Stadium: Ali Sami Yen Stadı; Attendance: 7,483; Referee: Hasan Ceylan

15 April 1989 27	Galatasaray	6–0	Kahramanmaraşspor	Istanbul
15:30 EET	Cüneyt Tanman 6'; Mersad Kovačević 7', 65'; Semih Yuvakuran 15'; Yusuf Altıntaş 36'; Zoran Simovic 38' (pen.)	(Report)		Stadium: Ali Sami Yen Stadı; Attendance: 15,191; Referee: İsmet Dikbaş

23 April 1989 28	Samsunspor	0–3	Galatasaray	Samsun
15:00 EET		(Report)		Stadium: Samsun 19 Mayıs Stadı

30 April 1989 29	Galatasaray	4–1	Adana Demirspor	Istanbul
15:30 EET	Mersad Kovačević 18'; Tanju Çolak 31', 63'; Yusuf Altıntaş 73'	(Report)	Zafer Tüzün 75' (pen.)	Stadium: Ali Sami Yen Stadı; Attendance: 16,779; Referee: Oğuz Sarvan

17 May 1989 30	Galatasaray	1–1	Fenerbahçe SK	Istanbul
17:30 EET	İsmail Demiriz 68'	(Report)	Oğuz Çetin 55'	Stadium: Ali Sami Yen Stadı; Attendance: 22,741; Referee: Erman Toroğlu

21 May 1989 31	Trabzonspor	3–2	Galatasaray	Trabzon
16:00 EET	Murat Şimşek 31'; Hami Mandıralı 64'; İsmail Gökçek 83'	(Report)	Uğur Tütüneker 81'; Tanju Çolak 85'	Stadium: Hüseyin Avni Aker Stadı; Referee: Oğuz Sarvan

24 May 1989 32	Galatasaray	3–1	Konyaspor	Istanbul
17:00 EET	Savaş Koç 11'; Uğur Tütüneker 49'; Tanju Çolak 56'	(Report)	Suat Kaya 71'	Stadium: Ali Sami Yen Stadı; Attendance: 8,088; Referee: Engin Kurt

28 May 1989 33	Galatasaray	5–2	MKE Ankaragücü	Istanbul
16:00 EET	Savaş Koç 29', 40'; Xhevat Prekazi 56'; Tanju Çolak 69' (pen.), 76'	(Report)	Şakir Öztürel 53'; Ziya Doğan 58'	Stadium: Ali Sami Yen Stadı; Attendance: 9,713; Referee: Kazım Ünlüsoy

31 May 1989 34	Altay SK	0–4	Galatasaray	İzmir
19:00 EET		(Report)	Tanju Çolak 11', 83'; Erhan Önal 54'; Savaş Koç 69'	Stadium: İzmir Atatürk Stadı; Attendance: 25,000; Referee: Ahmet Çakar

4 June 1989 35	Beşiktaş JK	0–1	Galatasaray	Istanbul
16:30 EET		(Report)	Tanju Çolak 28'	Stadium: İnönü Stadı; Attendance: 19,673; Referee: Yusuf Namoğlu

11 June 1989 36	Galatasaray	1–0	Eskişehirspor	Istanbul
16:30 EET	Tanju Çolak 44'	(Report)		Stadium: Ali Sami Yen Stadı; Attendance: 21,718; Referee: Erman Toroğlu

== Turkish Cup ==
Kick-off listed in local time (EET)

=== 3rd round ===
25 January 1989 1	Ayvalıkgücü	0–1	Galatasaray	Ayvalık
13:30 EET		(Report)	Uğur Tütüneker 36'	Stadium: Hüsnü Uğural Stadı; Referee: Halit Gerçeker

1 February 1989 2	Galatasaray	5–1 (6–1 agg.)	Ayvalıkgücü	Istanbul
12:30 EET	Savaş Koç 1'; Mersad Kovačević 12'; Uğur Tütüneker 22', 28'; Semih Yuvakuran 71'	(Report)	Ali İhsan 75'	Stadium: Ali Sami Yen Stadı; Attendance: 5,848; Referee: Vahap Beyaz

=== 4th round ===
8 February 1989 1	Bursaspor	0–1	Galatasaray	Bursa
14:00 EET		(Report)	Muhammet Altıntaş 37'	Stadium: Bursa Atatürk Stadı; Referee: Oğuz Sarvan

15 February 1989 2	Galatasaray	4–2 (5–2 agg.)	Bursaspor	Istanbul
13:30 EET	Cüneyt Tanman 9'; Uğur Tütüneker 34'; Tanju Çolak 59'; Metin Yıldız 82'	(Report)	Şenol Ulusavaş 36'; Erkan Ültanır 70'	Stadium: Ali Sami Yen Stadı; Attendance: 16,797; Referee: Coşkun Kutay

=== Quarter-finals ===
22 March 1989 1	Fenerbahçe SK	2–2	Galatasaray	Istanbul
14:30 EET	İsmail Kartal 4' (pen.); Rıdvan Dilmen 46'	(Report)	Tanju Çolak 53', 73'	Stadium: Fenerbahçe Stadı; Attendance: 14,857; Referee: Özcan Oal

3 May 1989 2	Galatasaray	3–4 (5–6 agg.)	Fenerbahçe SK	Istanbul
15:00 EET	Tanju Çolak 11' (pen.), 16', 38'	(Report)	Aykut Kocaman 47'; Hasan Vezir 53', 71', 82'	Stadium: Ali Sami Yen Stadı; Attendance: 16,175; Referee: Sadık Deda

== European Cup ==
=== 1st round ===
7 September 1988 1	Rapid Wien	2–1	Galatasaray	Wien
17:00 EET	Zlatko Kranjcar 32'; Reinhard Kienast 51'	(Report)	Savaş Demirel 81'	Stadium: Gerhard Hanappi Stadı; Attendance: 14,500; Referee: (Spain) Emilio Soriano Aladren

5 October 1988 2	Galatasaray	2–0 (3–2 agg.)	Rapid Wien	Istanbul
17:00 EET	Tanju Çolak 53'; Cüneyt Tanman 67'	(Report)		Stadium: Ali Sami Yen Stadı; Attendance: 37,500; Referee: (England) George Courtney

=== 2nd round ===
26 October 1988 1	Neuchâtel Xamax	3–0	Galatasaray	Neuchâtel
19:00 CET	Robert Lüthi 55'; Frédéric Chassot 87'; Michel Decastel 90'	(Report)		Stadium: Stade de la Maladière; Attendance: 23,000; Referee: (Denmark) Henning-Lund Sörensen

9 November 1988 2	Galatasaray	5–0 (5–3 agg.)	Neuchâtel Xamax	Istanbul
17:00 EET	Uğur Tütüneker 19' 77'; Tanju Çolak 55', 78', 84'	(Report)		Stadium: Ali Sami Yen Stadı; Attendance: 35,149; Referee: (France) Joel Quiniou

=== Quarter-finals ===
1 March 1989 1	AS Monaco	0–1	Galatasaray	Monaco
19:30 CET		(Report)	Tanju Çolak 19'	Stadium: Stade de la Maladière; Attendance: 16,000; Referee: (Germany) Dieter Pauly

15 March 1989 2	Galatasaray	1–1 (2–1 agg.)	AS Monaco	Köln
	Xhevat Prekazi 51'	(Report)	George Weah 65'	Stadium: Müngersdorfer Stadion; Attendance: 60,000; Referee: (Belgium) Marcel Van Langenhove

=== Semi-finals ===
5 April 1989 1	FC Steaua București	4–0	Galatasaray	Bucharest
16:30 CEST	Ilie Dumitrescu 8'; Gheorghe Hagi 40' (pen.); Dan Petrescu 68'; Gavril Balint 72'	(Report)		Stadium: Stadionul Steaua; Attendance: 21,161; Referee: (Portugal) Victor Fernandez

19 April 1989 2	Galatasaray	1–1 (1–5 agg.)	FC Steaua București	İzmir
16:30 TRT	Cüneyt Tanman 36'	(Report)	Ilie Dumitrescu 39'	Stadium: İzmir Atatürk Stadı; Attendance: 35,000; Referee: (England) Keith Hackett

== Friendly Matches ==
Kick-off listed in local time (EET)

=== TSYD Kupası ===
13 August 1988 1	Galatasaray	1–0	Fenerbahçe SK	Istanbul
17:00 EET	Tanju Çolak 57'	(Report)		Stadium: Ali Sami Yen Stadı; Attendance: 34,473; Referee: İhsan Türe

14 August 1988 2	Beşiktaş JK	1–1	Galatasaray	Istanbul
17:00 EET	Les Ferdinand 10'	(Report)	Mersad Kovačević 49'	Stadium: İnönü Stadı; Attendance: 36,758; Referee: Yusuf Namoğlu

== Attendance ==
Competition	Av. Att.	Total Att.
1. Lig	19,034	342,620
Turkish Cup	12,940	38,820
European Cup	37,993	151,973
Total	21,337	533,413
