= 1986–87 Galatasaray S.K. season =

Galatasaray
1986–87 season
- President: (Turkey) Ali Tanrıyar
- Manager: (Germany) Jupp Derwall
- Stadium: Ali Sami Yen Stadı
- 1. Lig: 1st
- Türkiye Kupası: 1/4 finalist
- UEFA Cup: 1st Round
- Süper Kupa: Winner
- Top goalscorer: League: Uğur Tütüneker (12); All: Uğur Tütüneker (14)
- Highest home attendance: 35,845 vs Eskişehirspor (1. Lig, 7 June 1987)
- Lowest home attendance: 10,251 vs Sarıyer G.K. (Türkiye Kupası, 25 February 1987)
- Average home league attendance: 27,240
Home colours	Away colours	Third colours

The 1986–87 season was Galatasaray's 83rd in existence and the 29th consecutive season in the 1. Lig. This article shows statistics of the club's players in the season, and also lists all matches that the club have played in the season.

== Squad statistics ==
No.	Pos.	Name	1. Lig		Türkiye Kupası		UEFA Cup		Süper Kupa		Total	
No.	Pos.	Name	Apps	Goals	Apps	Goals	Apps	Goals	Apps	Goals	Apps	Goals
-	GK	(Socialist Federal Republic of Yugoslavia) Zoran Simović	33	0	4	0	2	0	1	0	40	0
-	GK	(Turkey) Hayrettin Demirbaş	3	0	2	0	0	0	0	0	5	0
-	GK	(Turkey) Imdat Korkmaz	0	0	0	0	0	0	0	0	0	0
-	DF	(Turkey) Semih Yuvakuran	34	0	5	0	2	0	1	0	42	0
-	DF	(Turkey) Cüneyt Tanman (C)	31	6	6	0	2	1	1	0	40	7
-	DF	(Turkey) İsmail Demiriz	36	1	6	1	2	0	1	0	45	2
-	DF	(Turkey) Ahmet Ceyhan	22	0	6	0	1	0	0	0	29	0
-	DF	(Turkey) Raşit Çetiner	21	2	2	1	2	0	0	0	25	3
-	DF	(Turkey) Yusuf Altıntaş	24	4	6	0	2	1	1	0	33	5
-	DF	(Turkey) Erhan Önal	35	2	6	0	2	0	1	0	44	2
-	MF	(Turkey) Savaş Koç	29	4	1	0	1	0	0	0	31	4
-	MF	(Turkey) Muhammet Altıntaş	21	2	5	2	2	0	1	0	29	4
-	MF	(Turkey) Adnan Esen	2	0	0	0	0	0	0	0	2	0
-	MF	(Turkey) Suat Kaya	3	0	0	0	0	0	0	0	3	0
-	MF	(Turkey) Tuncay Soyak	6	0	2	0	0	0	0	0	8	0
-	MF	(Turkey) Arif Kocabıyık	18	0	2	0	1	0	1	0	22	0
-	MF	(Socialist Federal Republic of Yugoslavia) Xhevat Prekazi	34	5	6	1	2	0	1	0	43	6
-	FW	(Turkey) Öner Kılıç	1	0	0	0	0	0	0	0	1	0
-	FW	(Turkey) Bülent Alkılıç	3	0	0	0	1	0	0	0	4	0
-	FW	(Turkey) Erkan Ültanır	10	0	1	0	0	0	0	0	11	0
-	FW	(Turkey) İlyas Tüfekçi	36	7	6	3	1	0	1	1	44	11
-	FW	(Socialist Federal Republic of Yugoslavia) Mersad Kovačević	25	8	6	4	0	0	0	0	31	12
-	FW	(Turkey) Uğur Tütüneker	32	12	3	0	1	0	1	2	37	14

=== Players in / out ===
==== In ====
Pos.	Nat.	Name	Age	Moving from
FW	(Turkey)	Uğur Tütüneker	23	FC Bayern Munich II
FW	(Turkey)	İlyas Tüfekçi	26	Fenerbahçe SK
FW	(Socialist Federal Republic of Yugoslavia)	Mersad Kovačević	30	Beşiktaş JK
MF	(Turkey)	Savaş Koç	23	SV Türkgücü-Ataspor München
GK	(Turkey)	Hayrettin Demirbaş	23	Altay SK
MF	(Turkey)	Muhammet Altıntaş	22	Edirnespor
MF	(Turkey)	Tuncay Soyak	27	Trabzonspor
MF	(Turkey)	Suat Kaya	19	Galatasaray A2

==== Out ====
Pos.	Nat.	Name	Age	Moving to
FW	(Turkey)	Erdal Keser	25	Borussia Dortmund
MF	(Turkey)	Adnan Esen (on loan)	25	Malatyaspor
FW	(Turkey)	Bülent Alkılıç	24	Diyarbakırspor
DF	(Turkey)	Halil İbrahim Akçay	26	Diyarbakırspor
FW	(Turkey)	Burak Dilmen	23	Antalyaspor

== 1. Lig ==
=== Standings ===
Pos	Team	Pld	W	D	L	GF	GA	GD	Pts	Qualification or relegation
1	Galatasaray (C)	36	23	8	5	55	24	+31	54	Qualification to European Cup first round
2	Beşiktaş	36	23	7	6	67	26	+41	53	Qualification to UEFA Cup first round
3	Samsunspor	36	19	11	6	56	22	+34	49	Invitation to Balkans Cup
4	Trabzonspor	36	18	13	5	49	21	+28	49	
5	Fenerbahçe	36	13	13	10	46	39	+7	39	

Rules for classification: 1) points; 2) goal difference; 3) number of goals scored.
(C) Champions

=== Matches ===
24 August 1986 1	Galatasaray SK	0–1	Trabzonspor	Adapazarı
17:00 EET		(Report)	İskender Günen 44'	Stadium: Atatürk Stadı; Referee: Sadık Deda

31 August 1986 2	Diyarbakırspor	0–1	Galatasaray SK	Istanbul
17:00 EET		(Report)	Cüneyt Tanman 23'	Stadium: Malatya İnönü Stadı; Referee: Burhan Koç

13 September 1986 3	Galatasaray SK	2–2	Gençlerbirliği SK	Istanbul
16:00 EET	Yusuf Altıntaş 32'; Cüneyt Tanman 87'	(Report)	Halil İbrahim Eren 40' (pen.); İsmail Akbaşlı 72'	Stadium: Ali Sami Yen Stadı; Attendance: 32,565; Referee: Yavuz Karaozan

21 September 1986 4	Fenerbahçe SK	1–2	Galatasaray SK	Istanbul
16:00 EET	Şenol Çorlu 18'	(Report)	Raşit Çetiner 64'; Uğur Tütüneker 87'	Stadium: Fenerbahçe Stadı; Attendance: 29,413; Referee: Aykan Köseoğlu

27 September 1986 5	Galatasaray SK	2–1	Malatyaspor	Istanbul
16:00 EET	Cüneyt Tanman 45'; Savaş Çorlu 90'	(Report)	Muzaffer Atacan 69'	Stadium: Ali Sami Yen Stadı; Attendance: 34,455; Referee: Oğuz Sarvan

5 October 1986 6	Denizlispor	1–1	Galatasaray SK	Denizli
15:00 EET	Erhan Yığ 63'	(Report)	Cüneyt Tanman 34'	Stadium: Atatürk Stadı; Referee: Kazım Ünlüsoy

12 October 1986 7	Galatasaray SK	1–0	Bursaspor	Istanbul
14:30 EET	Uğur Tütüneker 68'	(Report)		Stadium: Ali Sami Yen Stadı; Attendance: 30,594; Referee: Sadık Deda

19 October 1986 8	Samsunspor	1–1	Galatasaray SK	Samsun
14:30 EET	Tanju Çolak 27'	(Report)	Raşit Çetiner 67'	Stadium: 19 Mayıs Stadı; Referee: Ahmet Akçay

25 October 1986 9	Galatasaray SK	1–1	Boluspor	Istanbul
15:00 EET	Recep Çetin 48'	(Report)	Şenol Kaba 64'	Stadium: Ali Sami Yen Stadı; Attendance: 16,359; Referee: Necmi Temizel

2 November 1986 10	Zonguldakspor	0–2	Galatasaray SK	Zonguldak
14:00 EET		(Report)	Mersad Kovačević 9'; Uğur Tütüneker 70'	Stadium: Atatürk Stadı; Referee: İlyas Ayan

8 November 1986 11	Galatasaray SK	1–1	Sarıyer G.K.	Istanbul
14:30 EET	Uğur Tütüneker 33'	(Report)	Sercan Görgülü 51'	Stadium: Ali Sami Yen Stadı; Attendance: 23,605; Referee: Ergül Yücedağ

16 November 1986 12	MKE Ankaragücü	1–2	Galatasaray SK	Ankara
14:00 EET	Yaşar Altıntaş 21'	(Report)	İlyas Tüfekçi 55', 68'	Stadium: 19 Mayıs Stadı; Referee: Hasan Ceylan

23 November 1986 13	Galatasaray SK	2–2	Beşiktaş JK	Istanbul
14:30 EET	Uğur Tütüneker 16', 75'	(Report)	Metin Tekin 33'; Feyyaz Uçar 56'	Stadium: Ali Sami Yen Stadı; Attendance: 27,475; Referee: Özcan Oal

30 November 1986 14	Altay SK	0–2	Galatasaray SK	İzmir
14:30 EET		(Report)	İlyas Tüfekçi 5'; Yusuf Altıntaş 79'	Stadium: İzmir Atatürk Stadium; Attendance: 45,684; Referee: Çoşkun Kutay

6 December 1986 15	Galatasaray SK	2–0	Rizespor	Istanbul
14:00 EET	İlyas Tüfekçi 13', 49'	(Report)		Stadium: Ali Sami Yen Stadı; Attendance: 29,143; Referee: Hamdi Kutvsl

14 December 1986 16	Kocaelispor	0–2	Galatasaray SK	Izmit
14:00 EET		(Report)	Erhan Altın 43' (o.g.); Uğur Tütüneker 82'	Stadium: İsmet Paşa Stadı; Referee: Kazım Ünlüsoy

21 December 1986 17	Galatasaray SK	4–0	Antalyaspor	Istanbul
14:00 EET	Cüneyt Tanman 46'; Uğur Tütüneker 60'; Yusuf Altıntaş 65'; Mersad Kovačević 75'	(Report)		Stadium: Ali Sami Yen Stadı; Attendance: 31,302; Referee: Necmi Temizel

28 December 1986 18	Eskişehirspor	1–1	Galatasaray SK	Eskişehir
13:30 EET	Yusuf Yazıcı 75'	(Report)	Savaş Koç 89'	Stadium: Atatürk Stadı; Referee: Ahmet Akçay

25 January 1987 19	Trabzonspor	0–0	Galatasaray SK	Trabzon
13:30 EET		(Report)		Stadium: Hüseyin Avni Aker Stadı; Referee: İlyas Ayan

31 January 1987 20	Galatasaray SK	3–0	Diyarbakırspor	Istanbul
14:00 EET	Mersad Kovačević 29'; Cüneyt Tanman 46'; Yusuf Altıntaş 59'	(Report)		Stadium: Ali Sami Yen Stadı; Attendance: 20,234; Referee: Engin Kurt

15 February 1987 21	Gençlerbirliği SK	1–0	Galatasaray SK	Ankara
14:00 EET	Harun Erol 57'	(Report)		Stadium: 19 Mayıs Stadı; Referee: Engin Kurt

22 February 1987 22	Galatasaray SK	0–1	Fenerbahçe SK	Istanbul
14:00 EET		(Report)	Kayhan Kaynak 40'	Stadium: Ali Sami Yen Stadı; Attendance: 34,640; Referee: Aykan Köseoğlu

1 March 1987 23	Malatyaspor	0–1	Galatasaray SK	Malatya
14:30 EET		(Report)	Mersad Kovačević 41'	Stadium: İnönü Stadı; Referee: Necmi Temizel

15 March 1987 24	Galatasaray SK	1–0	Denizlispor	İzmir
14:30 EET	Mersad Kovačević 88'	(Report)		Stadium: İzmir Atatürk Stadium; Attendance: 29,281; Referee: Hasan Ceylan

22 March 1987 25	Bursaspor	1–0	Galatasaray SK	Bursa
14:30 EET	Nenad Bijedić 49'	(Report)		Stadium: Atatürk Stadı; Referee: İlyas Ayan

28 March 1987 26	Galatasaray SK	4–1	Samsunspor	Istanbul
14:30 EET	Mersad Kovačević 6', 79'; Uğur Tütüneker 24' (pen.); Dzevad Prekazi 42'	(Report)	Tanju Çolak 90' (pen.)	Stadium: Ali Sami Yen Stadı; Attendance: 22,268; Referee: Coşkun Kutay

4 April 1987 27	Boluspor	0–1	Galatasaray SK	Ankara
14:00 EET		(Report)	Savaş KOç 21'	Stadium: 19 Mayıs Stadı; Referee: Burhan Koçak

12 April 1987 28	Galatasaray SK	2–1	Zonguldakspor	Istanbul
15:30 EET	Muhammet Altıntaş 19'; İlyas Tüfekçi 68'	(Report)	Şenol Ulusavaş 75'	Stadium: Ali Sami Yen Stadı; Attendance: 19,061; Referee: Ahmet Akçay

18 April 1987 29	Sarıyer G.K.	1–2	Galatasaray SK	Istanbul
15:30 EET	Engin Ülker 71'	(Report)	İsmail Demiriz 3'; Dzevad Prekazi 28'	Stadium: Ali Sami Yen Stadı; Attendance: 29,997; Referee: Ayhan Köseoğlu

25 April 1987 30	Galatasaray SK	2–0	MKE Ankaragücü	Istanbul
15:30 EET	Erhan Önal 25'; İlyas Tüfekçi 63'	(Report)		Stadium: Ali Sami Yen Stadı; Attendance: 29,816; Referee: İlyas Ayan

3 May 1987 31	Beşiktaş JK	0–2	Galatasaray SK	Istanbul
16:00 EET		(Report)	Dzevad Prekazi 24'; Savaş Koç 86'	Stadium: Fenerbahçe Stadı; Attendance: 32,397; Referee: Özcan Oal

10 May 1987 32	Galatasaray SK	1–0	Altay SK	Istanbul
16:00 EET	Uğur Tütüneker 21'	(Report)		Stadium: Ali Sami Yen Stadı; Attendance: 31,339; Referee: Burhan Koçak

16 May 1987 33	Rizespor	2–0	Galatasaray SK	Rize
15:00 EET	Abdullah Avcı 36' (pen.); Hakan Tecimer 53'	(Report)		Stadium: Atatürk Stadı; Referee: Coşkun Kutay

24 May 1987 34	Galatasaray SK	2–1	Kocaelispor	Istanbul
15:00 EET	Uğur Tütüneker 13'; Erhan Önal 77'	(Report)	Ceyhun Güray 82'	Stadium: Ali Sami Yen Stadı; Attendance: 15,098; Referee: İlyas Ayan

31 May 1987 35	Antalyaspor	1–3	Galatasaray SK	Antalya
16:00 EET	Murat Şimşek 83'	(Report)	Uğur Tütüneker 25'; Dzevad Prekazi 52'; Mersad Kovačević 18'	Stadium: Atatürk Stadı; Referee: Necmi Temizel

7 June 1987 36	Galatasaray SK	2–1	Eskişehirspor	Istanbul
16:00 EET	Dzevad Prekazi 18'; Muhammet Altıntaş 51'	(Report)	Nedim Demirbilek 56'	Stadium: Ali Sami Yen Stadı; Attendance: 35,845; Referee: Aykan Köseoğlu

== Türkiye Kupası ==
Kick-off listed in local time (EET)

=== 5th round ===
28 January 1987 1	Galatasaray SK	6–2	Antalyaspor	Istanbul
14:00 EET	İlyas Tüfekçi 24'; İsmail Demiriz 38'; Mersad Kovačević 41', 43', 46', 52'	(Report)	Ümit Birol 59'; Feridun Alkan 69'	Stadium: Ali Sami Yen Stadı; Attendance: 11,044; Referee: Burhan Koçak

28 January 1987 2	Antalyaspor	0–0	Galatasaray SK	Antalya
13:30 EET		(Report)		Stadium: Atatürk Stadı; Referee: İbrahim Acar

=== 6th round ===
18 February 1987 1	Sarıyer G.K.	2–2	Galatasaray SK	Istanbul
14:00 EET	Engin Ülker 27'; Sead Celebic 77' (pen.)	(Report)	İlyas Tüfekçi 24'; Muhammet Altıntaş 83'	Stadium: Fenerbahçe Stadı; Attendance: 7,572; Referee: İhsan Türe

25 February 1987 2	Galatasaray SK	4–2	Sarıyer G.K.	Istanbul
13:30 EET	Dzevad Prekazi 7'; Raşit Çetiner 42' (pen.); İlyas Tüfekçi 54'; Muhammet Altıntaş 83'	(Report)	Rıdvan Dilmen 24', 76'	Stadium: Ali Sami Yen Stadı; Attendance: 10,251; Referee: Yusuf Namoğlu

=== 1/4 final ===
18 March 1987 1	Eskişehirspor	3–0	Galatasaray SK	Eskişehir
14:30 EET	Naser Beadini 53', 65'; Nedim Demirbilek 67'	(Report)		Stadium: Atatürk Stadı; Referee: Necmi Temizel

1 April 1987 2	Galatasaray SK	0–0	Eskişehirspor	Istanbul
15:00 EET		(Report)		Stadium: Ali Sami Yen Stadı; Attendance: 12,600; Referee: Serdar Çakman

== UEFA Cup ==
=== 1st round ===
17 September 1986 1	Universitatea Craiova	2–0	Galatasaray SK	Craiova
17:00 EET	Ion Geolgau 57'; Marian Bicu 86'	(Report)		Stadium: Stadionul Ion Oblemenco; Referee: (Germany) Dieter Pauly

1 October 1986 2	Galatasaray SK	2–1	Universitatea Craiova	Istanbul
17:00 EET	Cüneyt Tanman 65'; Yusuf Altıntaş 88'	(Report)	Georghe Bita 1'	Stadium: Ali Sami Yen Stadı; Attendance: 31,035; Referee: (Italy) Rosario Lo Bello

== Süper Kupa-Cumhurbaşkanlığı Kupası ==
Kick-off listed in local time (EET)

14 June 1987 1	Galatasaray SK	3–2	Gençlerbirliği SK	Ankara
:00 EET	İlyas Tüfekçi 42' (pen.); Uğur Tütüneker 72', 116'	(Report)	Osman Özdemir 65'; Avni Okumuş 90'	Stadium: 19 Mayıs Stadı; Attendance: 22,773; Referee: Özcan Oal

== Friendly Matches ==
Kick-off listed in local time (EET)

=== TSYD Kupası ===
13 August 1986 1	Galatasaray SK	2–2	Fenerbahçe SK	Istanbul
17:00 EET	Raşit Çetiner 64' (pen.); Uğur Tütüneker 70'	(Report)	Şenol Çorlu 9', 29'	Stadium: Ali Sami Yen Stadı; Attendance: 35,000; Referee: Kemal Yeşeren

16 August 1986 2	Beşiktaş JK	2–2	Galatasaray SK	Istanbul
17:00 EET	Metin Tekin 48'; Rıza Çalımbay 56'	(Report)	Cüneyt Tanman 46'; Xhevat Prekazi 89'	Stadium: Fenerbahçe Stadı; Referee: İlker Zümrüt

== Attendance ==
Competition	Av. Att.	Total Att.
1. Lig	27,240	463,080
Türkiye Kupası	11,298	33,895
UEFA Cup	31,035	31,035
Total	25,143	528,010
