= 1987–88 Turkish Cup =

Türkiye Kupası

Tournament details
- Country: Turkey
- Teams: 68

Final positions
- Champions: Sakaryaspor (1st title)
- Runners-up: Samsunspor

Tournament statistics
- Matches played: 98
- Goals scored: 288 (2.94 per match)
- Top goal scorer(s): Serdar Şenkaya (6 goals)

The 1987–88 Turkish Cup was the 26th edition of the annual tournament that determined the association football Süper Lig Turkish Cup (Turkish: Türkiye Kupası) champion under the auspices of the Turkish Football Federation (Turkish: Türkiye Futbol Federasyonu; TFF). Sakaryaspor successfully contested Samsunspor 3–1 in the final. The results of the tournament also determined which clubs would be promoted or relegated.

== First round ==
Team 1	Score	Team 2
Yeni Salihlispor	0–3	Tarişspor
Adıyamanspor	2–1	Bitlisspor
Diyarbakırspor	3–0	Şanlıurfaspor
Bartınspor	2–1	Ünyespor
Elbistanspor	4–3	Kahramanmaraşspor
Hatay Sahilspor	1–2	Adanaspor
Kayserispor	4–4 (4–2 p)	Gaziantepspor
Kırıkkalespor	0–1	Nevşehirspor
Niğdespor	1–4	İskenderunspor
Petrol Ofisi	2–0	Hacettepe Gençlik Kulübü
Trabzonspor (AM)	4–2	Artvin Hopaspor
Antalyaspor	0–1	Konyaspor
Bursaspor (AM)	2–1 (aet)	Tavşanlı Linyitspor
Eyüp	0–1	Kartalspor
Gölcükspor	0–2	Sönmez Filamentspor
Ispartaspor	1–2	Alanyaspor
Kuşadasıspor	5–0	Nazillispor
Kütahyaspor	0–0 (5–4 p)	PTT
Manisaspor	0–1	Bergamaspor
Menemenspor	3–1	İzmirspor
Tekirdağspor	2–0	Çorluspor
Uşakspor	1–0	Ankara Demirspor
Yalovaspor	0–0 (0–3 p)	Bakırköy
Zeytinburnu	3–2	Uzunköprüspor

== Second round ==
Team 1	Score	Team 2
Diyarbakırspor	1–1 (4–3 p)	Adıyamanspor
Bartınspor	3–0	Trabzonspor (AM)
Elbistanspor	0–1	Kayserispor
İskenderunspor	1–2	Adanaspor
Kütahyaspor	0–0 (4–5 p)	Uşakspor
Nevşehirspor	3–0	Petrol Ofisi
Konyaspor	4–0	Alanyaspor
Bakırköy	2–1 (aet)	Kartalspor
Bursaspor (AM)	2–1	Sönmez Filamentspor
Menemenspor	2–1	Bergamaspor
Tarişspor	0–1	Kuşadasıspor
Zeytinburnu	3–2	Tekirdağspor

== Third round ==
Team 1	Agg.	Team 2	1st leg	2nd leg
Rizespor	1–2	Zonguldakspor	1–0	0–2
Diyarbakırspor	2–2 (a)	Altay	2–1	0–1
Eskişehirspor	6–2	Bartınspor	4–0	2–2
Kayserispor	2–9	Galatasaray	1–5	1–4
Samsunspor	1–0	Nevşehirspor	1–0	0–0
Adanaspor	1–5	Fenerbahçe	1–1	0–4
Bakırköy	5–11	Trabzonspor	3–3	2–8
Beşiktaş	2–1	Kuşadasıspor	1–0	1–1
Bursaspor (AM)	3–8	Bursaspor	2–4	1–4
Denizlispor	3–4	Kocaelispor	1–0	2–4
Karşıyaka	2–2 (a)	Adana Demirspor	2–1	0–1
Menemenspor	0–11	Boluspor	0–3	0–8
Sakaryaspor	4–1	Konyaspor	4–0	0–1
Sarıyer	4–2	Gençlerbirliği	2–1	2–1
Uşakspor	3–2	Malatyaspor	3–1	0–1
Zeytinburnu	1–3	Ankaragücü	0–0	1–3

== Fourth round ==
Team 1	Agg.	Team 2	1st leg	2nd leg
Adana Demirspor	2–2 (a)	Kocaelispor	1–2	1–0
Beşiktaş	3–2	Altay	1–0	2–2
Boluspor	3–2	Bursaspor	3–1	0–1
Fenerbahçe	3–6	Sakaryaspor	1–5	2–1
Ankaragücü	5–2	Galatasaray	2–1	3–1
Samsunspor	4–2	Uşakspor	4–1	0–1
Sarıyer	2–2 (a)	Trabzonspor	1–0	1–2
Zonguldakspor	1–1 (a)	Eskişehirspor	0–0	1–1

== Quarter-finals ==
Team 1	Agg.	Team 2	1st leg	2nd leg
Kocaelispor	4–4 (6–7 p)	Samsunspor	3–1	1–3
Sakaryaspor	5–0	Beşiktaş	4–0	1–0
Sarıyer	3–4	Ankaragücü	2–3	1–1
Zonguldakspor	2–2 (a)	Boluspor	1–0	1–2

== Semi-finals ==
=== Summary table ===
Team 1	Agg.	Team 2	1st leg	2nd leg
Samsunspor	2–2 (a)	Ankaragücü	1–0	1–2
Zonguldakspor	1–5	Sakaryaspor	0–5	1–0

=== 1st leg ===
27 April 1988 Semi-final	Samsunspor	1–0	Ankaragücü	Samsun
15:00 EEST (UTC+03)	Mete 67'			Stadium: Samsun 19 Mayıs Stadium; Referee: İhsan Türe

27 April 1988 Semi-final	Zonguldakspor	0–5	Sakaryaspor	Zonguldak
15:00 EEST (UTC+03)			Serdar 8' (pen.); Kemal 53'; Aykut 59'; Sinan 73'; Hakan 88'	Stadium: Zonguldak Şehir Stadium; Referee: Engin Kurt

=== 2nd leg ===
4 May 1988 Semi-final	Ankaragücü	2–1	Samsunspor	Ankara
15:00 EEST (UTC+03)	Yaşar 11'; Hayati 86'		Yücel 24'	Stadium: Ankara 19 Mayıs Stadium; Referee: Sadık Deda

4 May 1988 Semi-final	Sakaryaspor	0–1	Zonguldakspor	Sakarya
15:00 EEST (UTC+03)			İsmail 38'	Stadium: Sakarya Atatürk Stadium; Referee: Selahattin Salar

== Final ==
=== 1st leg ===
11 May 1988 Final	Sakaryaspor	2–0	Samsunspor	Adapazarı, Turkey
15:00 EEST (UTC+03)	Oğuz 31'; Sinan 62'			Stadium: Sakarya Atatürk Stadium; Referee: İlyas Ayan

=== 2nd leg ===
18 May 1988 Final	Samsunspor	1–1	Sakaryaspor	Samsun, Turkey
15:00 EEST (UTC+03)	Mustafa 64'		Sinan 18'	Stadium: Samsun 19 Mayıs Stadium; Referee: İhsan Türe
