= Ümit Birol =

Turkish footballer (1963–2023)

Personal information
- Date of birth: 26 January 1963
- Place of birth: Samsun, Turkey
- Date of death: 10 July 2023 (aged 60)
- Position: Midfielder

Senior career*
Years	Team	Apps	(Gls)
1981–1984	Samsunspor		
1984–1986	Adanaspor		
1986–1987	Antalyaspor		
1987–1989	Adana Demirspor		
1989–1991	Altay		
1991–1993	Fenerbahçe		
1993–1994	Kocaelispor		
1994–1996	Çanakkale Dardanelspor		
1996	→ Eskişehirspor (loan)		
1996–1998	Adana Demirspor		
1998	Yıldırım Bosna		

International career
1991	Turkey	1	(0)

Managerial career
- 2004–2005: Erzurumspor (assistant)
- 2005: Erzurumspor
- 2006: Altay (assistant)
- 2006: Altay
- 2007: Erzincanspor
- 2007–2008: Alibeyköy
- 2008: Gaziosmanpaşaspor
- 2008–2009: Erzurumspor
- 2009–2010: Tepecikspor
- 2010: Samsunspor (U21)
- 2011: 1930 Bafraspor
- 2012: Lülebyrgazspor
- * Club domestic league appearances and goals

Ümit Birol (26 January 1963 – 10 July 2023) was a Turkish football player and manager. A midfielder, he was capped once for the Turkey national team, and was also a squad member at the 1987 Mediterranean Games.

Birol died from a heart attack on 10 July 2023, at the age of 60.

== See also ==
- Ali Güzeldal
