= Ali Beykoz =

Turkish footballer (born 1964)

Personal information
- Date of birth: 14 November 1964 (age 61)
- Place of birth: Hınıs, Turkey
- Position: Midfielder

Senior career*
Years	Team	Apps	(Gls)
1983–1985	Boluspor	29	(1)
1985–1987	Konyaspor	52	(12)
1987–1989	Adanaspor	35	(5)
1989–1992	Bursaspor	70	(8)
1992–1993	Denizlispor	22	(7)
1994–1995	Zonguldakspor	12	(2)
1995–1996	Düzcespor	23	(6)
1995–1997	Adanaspor	45	(7)
1997–2001	Mudurnuspor	20	(7)
2000	→ Türk Telekom (loan)	10	(2)

Managerial career
- 2001: Boluspor (assistant)
- 2002–2003: Düzcespor
- 2003–2004: Boluspor (assistant)
- 2004–2005: Gölcükspor
- 2006–2007: Gölcükspor
- 2008: Kırşehirspor
- 2007: Alibeyköy
- 2010: Siirtspor (assistant)
- 2010: Siirtspor
- 2010–2011: Kirikhanspor
- 2013: Boluspor
- 2014–2015: Gölcükspor
- 2016: Kirikhanspor
- 2016: Denizli BS
- 2017: 12 Bingölspor
- 2018: 12 Bingölspor
- 2019: Gölcükspor
- 2020: İskenderun FK
- * Club domestic league appearances and goals

Ali Beykoz (born 14 November 1964) is a Turkish football manager and former player who played as a midfielder. (Note: Ali Beykoz at WorldFootball.net)
