= Gölcükspor =

Association football club in Gölcük, Kocaeli

- Full name: Gölcük Spor Kulübü
- Short name: Gölcükspor
- Founded: 1984; 42 years ago
- Ground: Gölcük Şehir Stadyumu, Gölcük, Kocaeli
- Capacity: 5,000
- President: Hüseyin Çardak
- Manager: vacant
- League: TFF 3. Lig
- 2025–26: TRAL/Group 9, 1st of 15 (promoted)
Home colours	Away colours

Gölcük Spor Kulübü, commonly referred to as Gölcükspor, is a Turkish professional football club based in Gölcük, Kocaeli. The club was founded in 1984 with the merger of Dumlupınar Youth Club (Amateur Gölcükspor and Dumlupınar Youth Club).

== History ==
The club began playing football in 1984 in the 3rd League. Originally established as "Gölcükgücü," the club was unable to change its name for three years due to legal requirements. It was later renamed as "Gölcükspor" but retained its original colors.

The history of sports in Gölcük dates back to 1924, following the establishment of the Naval Command and Shipyard Command in Gölcük . The first federated club in the district was founded in 1950 by Nurettin Saral, Remzi Dobrucalı, Sedat Kahyaoğlu, Nihat Akay, and Fahrettin İlem.

This club started to compete in Kocaeli Amateur cluster as federated in 1950. Ercüment Kızıltan, Güngör Yüksel, Atty. Ömer Lütfü Özkes was named as "Gölcükspor" by Lütfü Takılgan, Mehmet Ancaza and Ali Fuat Kanpara in accordance with the regulations of Professional Kocaelispor

At the end of the 1983-84 Season, Dumlupınar Gençlik kulübünün (Amateur Gölcükspor and Dumlupınar Youth) merged and joined the Professional 3rd League, which was re-established in the 1984/85 season as "Gölcükgücü".

At the end of the 1983-84 Season, Dumlupınar Gençlik kulübünün merged and joined the Professional 3. Lig, which was re-established in the 1984–85 season as "Gölcükgücü".

During the 1983-84 Season, Dumlupınar Youth changed the name while struggling in the away league, and although it remained Red-Black, its name became Gölcükgücü.

In the 1984–1985 season, in the first season of the 3. Lig, as a Champion, in the 1985–1986 season, they struggled in the 2. Lig (with the current name, the 1st League).

In 2018–19, the season started with Gölcükspor Kayhan Çubuklu, Mustafa Sert coached the club until the 23rd week and after the 30th week, the team in the league was under the direction of Ali Beykoz . The club secured won 9 wins, 13 draws and 12 losses in 34 games. He finished his group 15th, collecting 40 points. Hüseyin Çardak was elected as the new chairman at the general assembly held after the end of the season. After the congress, the new management brought the former football player Taner Güller to coach the unit. After the first 14 weeks of the league, Taner Güller resigned from his post. Gölcükspor, which has 14 games under the management of Güller, featured 4 wins, 3 draws and 7 losses. At the end of 14 weeks, the team was 14th with 15 points. After Gulleri, Sadi Tekelioğlu was appointed as the coach of the team.

Gölcükspor, which has been competing in the 3. Lig in all remaining seasons except for 1 year since its establishment, is the team that competes the most in this League.

The club did not manage to participate in leagues between 1999 and 2001 due to the earthquake of August 17, 1999.

== Current squad ==
As of 7 May 2020

Note: Flags indicate national team as defined under FIFA eligibility rules; some limited exceptions apply. Players may hold more than one non-FIFA nationality.

No.	Pos.	Nation	Player
1	GK	TUR	Hüseyin Arslan
2	DF	TUR	Fatih Adigüzel
3	DF	TUR	Ali Mert Isik
5	DF	TUR	Erdem Korkmaz Güner
7	FW	TUR	Baris Sen
8	MF	TUR	Furkan Özyapi
10	MF	TUR	Batuhan Boyoglu
11	FW	TUR	Yücel Candemir
13	MF	TUR	Emre Yüksektepe
14	DF	TUR	Volkan Özcan
15	DF	TUR	Evren Kilarci

No.	Pos.	Nation	Player
18	MF	TUR	Kadirhan Atagün
20	MF	TUR	Ismail Yüksek
27	DF	TUR	Tayfun Ikiz
28	MF	TUR	Enes Cidemli
29	DF	TUR	Kadir Öge
34	DF	TUR	Serdar Yazici
48	GK	TUR	Metehan Bakkallar
52	FW	TUR	Efkan Kargoglu
62	MF	TUR	Emir Öztürk
88	FW	TUR	Hasancan Katilmis
99	GK	TUR	Soner Ay

== Competitive record ==
- '1. Lig: 1 season '

1985–1986

- '3. Lig: 32 seasons'

1984–1985, 1986—present

== Performances ==
	League	Pos.	Matches	Won	Drawn	Lost	Goals scored	Goals conceded	Points	Cup	Top Scorer	Technical Director
1984—85	3. Lig	1.	30	20	7	3	37	12	67	-	-	-
1985—86	1. Lig	18.	34	6	13	15	22	37	31	2.Tur	Erdoğan (4)	-
1986—87	3. Lig	2.	30	20	7	3	37	10	67	2.Tur	-	-
1987—88	3. Lig	11.	34	9	14	11	31	36	41	1.Tur	-	-
1988—89	3. Lig	6.	32	13	11	8	41	33	50	-	-	-
1989—90	3. Lig	4.	26	12	8	6	33	27	44	-	-	-
1990—91	3. Lig	7.	34	11	14	9	30	29	47	5.Tur	Orkun Koç (4)	-
1991—92	3. Lig	16.	34	9	6	19	28	50	33	-	Orkun Koç (7)	-
1992—93	3. Lig	5.	30	12	9	9	26	25	45	-	Özkan Yiğit(7)	-
1993—94	3. Lig	6.	24	10	5	9	26	22	35	1.Tur	-	-
1994—95	3. Lig	9.	26	7	10	9	15	21	31	-	Adil Kuru (3)	
1995—96	3. Lig	11.	26	5	13	8	26	29	28	-	Aydın Yalabık (12)	
1996—97	3. Lig	13.	32	9	10	13	30	44	37	-	-	
1997—98	3. Lig	13.	32	9	11	12	36	35	38	-	-	
1998—99	3. Lig	9.	32	12	8	12	49	45	44	-	Ali Kunter (26)	
1999—00	Did't participate due to 1999 Earthquake.											
2000—01	Did't participate due to 1999 Earthquake.											
2001—02	3. Lig	14.	36	11	10	15	43	51	43	-		
2002—03	3. Lig	12.	29	9	7	12	33	39	34	-		
2003—04	3. Lig	11.	32	10	11	11	29	39	41	-	Alaatin Özsoy (5)	
2004—05	3. Lig	14.	30	8	11	11	32	39	35	-	Çağrı Şimşek (5)	
2005—06	3. Lig	6.	30	11	10	9	38	31	43	-	Emre Okur (11)	
2006—07	3. Lig	4.	32	14	8	10	44	34	50	-	Kadir Yılmaz (11)	
2007—08	3. Lig	11.	30	11	6	13	37	48	39	-	Yıldırım Yılmaz (9)	
2008—09	3. Lig	4.	32	12	15	5	42	33	51	-	Ali Mumcu (7)	
2009—10	3. Lig	5.	36	14	10	12	51	50	52	-	Hakan Tice (8)	
2010—11	3. Lig	6.	34	13	12	9	38	27	51	-	Fatih Gümüşel (14)	
2011—12	3. Lig	9.	36	10	17	9	33	32	47	-	Sezgin Bektaş (8)	
2012—13	3. Lig	11.	34	12	8	14	45	48	44	2.Tur	Sadettin Özer (10)	
2013—14	3. Lig	6.	34	13	12	9	40	33	51	2.Tur	Yeldar Yamaç (7)	
2014—15	3. Lig	5.	36	15	12	9	49	39	57	2.Tur	Yeldar Yamaç (9)	
2015—16	3. Lig	6.	36	16	10	10	43	33	58	3.Tur	Gaffar Toplu (14)	
2016—17	3. Lig	6.	36	15	11	10	48	41	56	1.Tur	Berke Bıyık (12)	Yusuf Tokuş
2017—18	3. Lig	11.	34	13	8	13	56	49	47	2.Tur	Berke Bıyık (17)	Ramiz Soydaş / Kayhan Çubuklu
2018—19	3. Lig	15.	34	9	13	12	28	32	40	2.Tur	Uğur Uğur (6)	Kayhan Çubuklu / Mustafa Sert / Ali Beykoz
2019—20	3. Lig											
