= Ali Güzeldal =

Turkish footballer

Personal information
- Full name: Ali Güzeldal
- Date of birth: April 10, 1986 (age 40)
- Place of birth: Samsun, Turkey
- Height: 1.75 m (5 ft 9 in)
- Position: Attacking midfielder

Team information
- Current team: İstanbul Başakşehir U14 (Manager)

Youth career
- 1999–2002: Bakirköyspor

Senior career*
Years	Team	Apps	(Gls)
2002–2005	Bakirköyspor	66	(25)
2005–2006	Trabzonspor	6	(1)
2005–2006	→ A. Sebatspor (loan)	15	(6)
2006–2012	Istanbul B.B.	48	(6)
2012–2014	Boluspor	22	(7)
2014	Orduspor	5	(0)

International career
2001	Turkey U16	2	(0)
2001–2002	Turkey U17	6	(1)
2002–2004	Turkey U18	16	(3)
2004	Turkey U19	4	(3)
2006	Turkey U20	1	(0)
2006–2007	Turkey U21	3	(0)
2011	Turkey A2	1	(0)

Managerial career
- 2016–: İstanbul Başakşehir U14
- * Club domestic league appearances and goals

Ali Güzeldal (born 10 April 1986) is a former Turkish professional footballer and currently the manager of the U14 squad at İstanbul Başakşehir. He played as an attacking midfielder.
