= Erman Toroğlu =

Turkish footballer

Personal information
- Full name: Erman Refik Toroğlu
- Date of birth: 24 November 1948 (age 77)
- Place of birth: Ankara, Turkey
- Height: 1.77 m (5 ft 10 in)
- Position: Defender

Senior career*
Years	Team	Apps	(Gls)
1967–1969	Ankara Güneşspor	51	(11)
1969–1977	MKE Ankaragücü	164	(4)
1977–1978	Mersin İdman Yurdu	14	(1)
Total		229	(16)

International career
1973	Turkey U-21	2	(0)
- * Club domestic league appearances and goals

Erman Toroğlu
Domestic
Years	League	Role
1984–1993	Süper Lig	Referee

International
Years	League	
1989	FIFA	

Erman Refik Toroğlu (born 24 November 1948) is a Turkish former association football player, FIFA-level referee and, current pundit and sports columnist.

== Career ==
Toroğlu earned his FIFA badge in 1989. In 1991, he refereed the qualifying match for Euro 92 between Switzerland and San Marino. The last arbitrated professional football game by Toroğlu was between Samsunspor and Fenerbahçe at Samsun 19 Mayıs Stadium in 1993–94 1.Lig season, ended 2–0, on 5 December 1993.

Toroğlu started punditry, joining Turkish sportscaster Şansal Büyüka, in the weekly football review show "Maraton", aired at Show TV, in 1996. The program lasted 8 years until 2004, when the show was moved to Lig TV of Digiturk satellite television provider. Toroğlu quit Maraton in 2010. He now works as a pundit on the sports channel EkolTV. He had a short punditry spell at TRT in 2015.

== Personal life ==
He married Şükran Toroğlu in 1974. They have two sons and divorced in 2017. In 2022, he married lawyer Ezgi Yavuz.

== Honours ==
Ankaragücü

- Turkish Cup (1): 1971–72
- Ministry of Youth and Sports Cup (1): 1977
