= Hayati Soydaş =

Turkish footballer (born 1966)

Personal information
- Date of birth: 1 May 1966 (age 60)
- Place of birth: Gümüşhane, Turkey
- Position: Midfielder

Senior career*
Years	Team	Apps	(Gls)
1985–1999	Ankaragücü		

Managerial career
- 1999–2003: Ankaragücü (assistant)
- 2003: Osmanlıspor
- 2006–2007: Gençlerbirliği (assistant)
- 2007: Gaziantepspor (assistant)
- 2008: Gençlerbirliği (assistant)
- 2009: Denizlispor (assistant)
- 2009–2010: Manisaspor (assistant)
- 2010: Sivasspor (assistant)
- 2011: Ankaragücü (assistant)
- 2013: Ankaragücü
- 2014–2015: Adana Demirspor (assistant)
- 201: Ankaragücü
- 2016: Şanlıurfaspor (assistant)
- 2017: Şanlıurfaspor
- 2017: Etimesgut Belediyespor
- 2018: KF Shkupi
- 2018–2019: Kahramanmaraşspor
- * Club domestic league appearances and goals

Hayati Soydaş (born 1 May 1966) is a Turkish football manager and former player.
