= Mersad Kovačević =

Bosnian-Herzegovinian footballer

Personal information
- Date of birth: 15 October 1956 (age 70)
- Place of birth: Tuzla, SFR Yugoslavia
- Position: Forward

Senior career*
Years	Team	Apps	(Gls)
1973–1984	Sloboda Tuzla	264	(78)
1984–1986	Beşiktaş	70	(34)
1986–1989	Galatasaray	87	(28)
1989–1990	Göztepe	13	(3)
- * Club domestic league appearances and goals

Mersad Kovačević (born 15 October 1956) is a retired Bosnian football player.

== Club career ==
Kovačević was a prolific forward who played for Bosnian club Sloboda Tuzla and Turkish giants Beşiktaş and Galatasaray. He ended his career playing in second league for Göztepe SK. During times spent in Turkey he was known as Mirsat Güneş. Also, his name is sometimes spelled Mirsad.

He appeared for Galatasaray in the 1988-89 European Cup, playing against Steaua București in the semifinal.

== External sources ==
- Mersad Kovačević at www.mackolik.com (in Turkish)
- stats
- Mersad Kovačević at BDFutbol
