= Erhan Önal =

Turkish footballer (1957–2021)

Personal information
- Date of birth: 3 September 1957
- Place of birth: İzmir, Turkey
- Date of death: 16 March 2021 (aged 63)
- Position: Centre-back

Senior career*
Years	Team	Apps	(Gls)
1975–1976	Bayern Munich II		
1976–1977	Bayern Munich	18	(1)
1978–1983	Standard Liège	62	(7)
1981–1982	→ Fenerbahçe (loan)	7	(0)
1983–1985	Türkgücü München		
1985–1992	Galatasaray	185	(12)
Total		272+	(20+)

International career
1979–1987	Turkey	12	(1)
- * Club domestic league appearances and goals

Erhan Önal (3 September 1957 – 16 March 2021) was a Turkish footballer who played as a centre-back.

== Career ==
Born in İzmir, Önal played for FC Bayern Munich II, FC Bayern Munich, Standard Liège, Fenerbahçe, Türkgücü München and Galatasaray.

Önal was the first Turkish immigrant in Germany to play in the Bundesliga.

In 2015, he stated that the mentality when he went on loan to Fenerbahçe was "'Erhan came, he should play, the team should come and sleep". Onal also said that the money he brought was a problem for everybody else and that the facilities were much worse than in Germany.

While playing for Standard Liège, Önal received an offer from Bayer Leverkusen. However, the transfer never happened because Liège kept its transfer fee too high. In response to this, he left for amateur club Türkgücü München, causing some people to assume he had retired.

Despite playing for the Turkey national team, he considered himself to be Bavarian and spoke better German than Turkish.

His daughter Bige Önal is an actress.
