= İlyas Tüfekçi =

Turkish footballer and manager

Personal information
- Date of birth: 3 February 1960 (age 66)
- Place of birth: Istanbul, Turkey
- Position: Striker

Senior career*
Years	Team	Apps	(Gls)
1980–1981	VfB Stuttgart	27	(13)
1981–1983	FC Schalke 04	62	(15)
1983–1986	Fenerbahçe	86	(30)
1986–1990	Galatasaray	89	(18)
1990–1992	Zeytinburnuspor	11	(3)

International career^{‡}
1981–1987	Turkey	18	(6)

Managerial career
- 1994: Kardemir Karabükspor
- 1994–1995: Kocaelispor (assistant)
- 1995: Zeytinburnuspor
- 1995–1996: İzmirspor
- 1996–1997: Adana Demirspor
- 1997: İzmirspor
- 1997: Çorluspor
- 1998: Sakaryaspor
- 1998–1999: Yimpaş Yozgatspor
- 1999: Sarıyer
- 2000: Vanspor
- 2001: Elazığspor
- 2001–2002: Sivasspor
- 2003: Göztepe
- 2003–2004: Altay
- 2005: Kardemir Karabükspor
- 2005–2006: Dardanelspor
- 2006–2007: Mersin İdman Yurdu
- 2007: Kırşehirspor
- 2008: Bandırmaspor
- 2008–2009: Beylerbeyi
- * Club domestic league appearances and goals as of 5 October 2009 ‡ National team caps and goals as of 5 October 2009

İlyas Tüfekçi (born 3 February 1960 in Istanbul) is a retired football striker and later manager.

During his club career, Tüfekçi played in Germany and Turkey for Stuttgart, Schalke, Fenerbahçe, Galatasaray and Zeytinburnuspor.
