= Oğuz Sarvan =

Turkish football referee and dentist

- Born: 18 April 1955 (age 71); İzmir, Turkey
- Other occupation: Dentist

Domestic
Years	League	Role
1990–2000	1.Lig	Referee

International
Years	League	Role
1991–2000	FIFA–listed	Referee

Oğuz Sarvan (born 18 April 1955) is a former Turkish professional football referee. He officiated the second leg of the 1999 Turkish Cup Final between Beşiktaş and Galatasaray. He was also a FIFA referee from 1991 to 2000. His last fixture in a European competition was the second tie between Werder Bremen and Bordeaux on 7 December 2000, in the 2000–01 UEFA Cup third phase, before retiring in January 2001. Outside football, he works as a dentist. His father, Muzaffer Sarvan was also a match official.
