= Ali Sami Yen Stadium =

Former stadium of Galatasaray

Ali Sami Yen Stadı
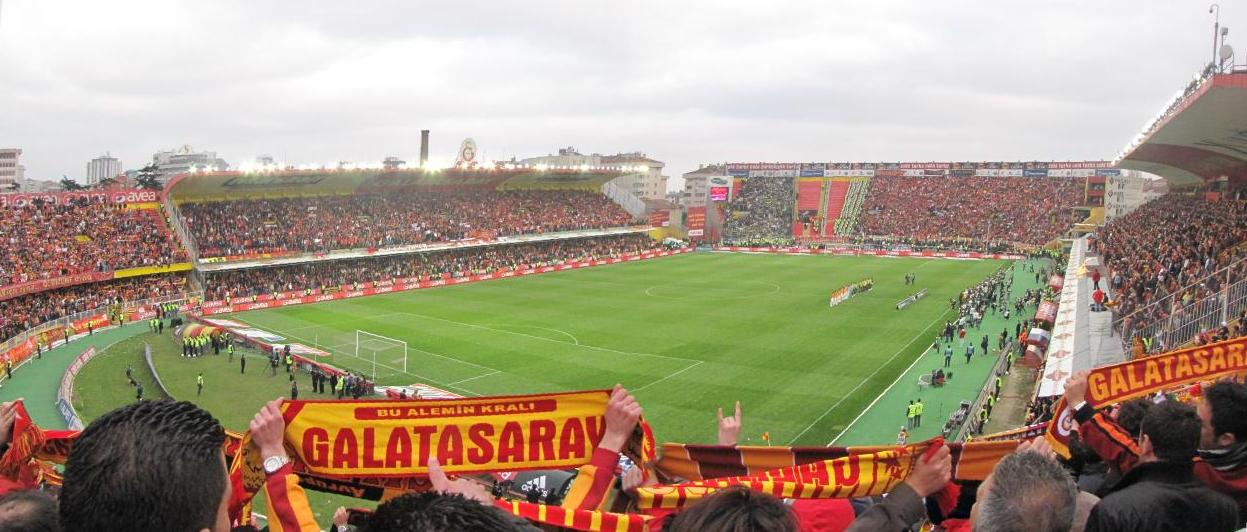
- Interactive map of Ali Sami Yen Stadı
- Full name: Ali Sami Yen Stadı
- Former names: Mecidiyeköy Stadı (1945–1964)
- Location: Mecidiyeköy, Istanbul, Turkey
- Coordinates: 41°03′55.62″N 28°59′56.28″E
- Owner: Galatasaray
- Capacity: 15,000 (1945–1964); 35,000 (1964–1996); 22,800 (1996–2005); 17,484 (2005–2006); 23,785 (2006–2008); 24,354 (2008–2011)
- Executive suites: 69
- Surface: Grass
- Record attendance: 48,600 (Turkey-Bulgaria, 20 December 1964)
- Field size: 105 x 65 m
- Public transit: Şişli—Mecidiyeköy

Construction
- Built: 1943–1945 and 1945–1964
- Opened: 1945 and 1964
- Renovated: 1996, 2008
- Expanded: 1964, 2008
- Closed: 11 January 2011; 15 years ago
- Demolished: 13 April 2011

Tenants
- Galatasaray (1966–1972, 1980–1984, 1986–2003, 2004–2011); Turkey national football team (1964–2009)

Ali Sami Yen Stadium (Turkish: Ali Sami Yen Stadyumu) was the home of the football club Galatasaray in Istanbul, Turkey, from 1964 to 2010. It is named after the founder of the club, Ali Sami Yen. The stadium had a all-seater capacity of 23,477 and was situated in the Mecidiyeköy quarter of the Şişli district, at the center of the European side of the city.

== History ==
=== Galatasaray needs a new stadium ===
Football was first played in Istanbul by some British players in a field known as Papazın Çayırı (Priest's Field) in the area that is now the site of Fenerbahçe's Şükrü Saracoğlu Stadium. With the opening of the Taksim Stadium in 1921, which was located inside the courtyard of the Ottoman era Taksim Artillery Barracks (Taksim Topçu Kışlası) built by Sultan Abdülmecid I in the 1840s; the surrounding walls of which were transformed into tribunes. This new stadium that became the new football headquarters. In the urban development of 1939, the military barracks in which the Taksim Stadium was located was demolished in 1940. The stadium was thus lost.

In this period, Fenerbahçe bought the land encompassing Papazın Çayırı and built the Fenerbahçe Stadium, while the Beşiktaş Club moved into the Şeref Stadium, located in the area where today's Çırağan Palace stands.

It was Galatasaray that experienced the biggest problem with the use of a stadium in that period. The first steps to overcome this problem were taken in the initial years of the 1930s. The first initiative to acquire a plot of land for Galatasaray was in 1933, when the then president of the club Ali Haydar Barşal showed an interest in a mulberry orchard in Mecidiyeköy.

=== From Taksim to Mecidiyeköy ===
In the period 1933-35, discussions held with the government resulted in the allocation of a plot of land outside of the city limits in Mecidiye Köyü (Mecidiye Village) for a stadium to be built for Galatasaray. Excavations for the construction began in 1936. The President of the Turkish Sports Organization at the time, Adnan Menderes, provided financial assistance for the project. The efforts were left in the excavation stage however. In 1940, the matter of the stadium came up again under the presidency of Tevfik Ali Çınar.

The same plot of land was leased to Galatasaray for a term of 30 years at a symbolical yearly rental fee of 1 lira. Galatasaray thus acquired the right to the use of the land. In leasing the land, Galatasaray committed to building a modern stadium as well as a bicycle velodrome. The construction could not start, however, due to limited funds and the general atmosphere of the war years. In 1943, Osman Dardağan led an initiative to build a modest stadium that would answer the immediate need.

=== Mecidiyeköy Stadium ===
In the atmosphere of war, only a small open tribune was allowed in the stadium, which was set on a field of earth and inaugurated under the presidency of Muslihittin Peykoğlu in 1945. Its distance from the city center in those days, however, its inaccessibility by public transportation, and the rough winds that characterized the district were factors that contributed to a long period in which the stadium lay idle and football games never took place. When the İnönü Stadium in the center of the city was opened in that period, Galatasaray abandoned the stadium building project in Mecidiyeköy, putting the project aside before fruition. In 1955, 30 more years were added to the right of utilization agreement, which at the time had 22 years to go, extending the terms until 2007.

When the club failed to undertake the building of the Stadium, the project was taken on by the Physical Education General Directorate. The construction started in 1959. In 1961, during the presidency of Refik Selimoğlu, a new agreement was signed with the Physical Education General Directorate whereby the utilization rights of the newly completed stadium were explicitly given to Galatasaray.

=== Ali Sami Yen Stadium / expansion ===
Ali Sami Yen Stadium was inaugurated on December 20, 1964, with a friendly game between Turkey and Bulgaria. Unfortunately, tragedy struck during the opening match: in one of the stands many people fell onto the first floor, which caused numerous injuries, but luckily none of them were fatal. Spotlights were added to the stadium in 1965, and night games began to be played. Despite this, however, not many night games were played. At the beginning of the 1970s, the stadium was abandoned for another period during which the İnönü Stadium began to be used again. In the 70s, the stadium was mostly used by Galatasaray for training sessions. In those years, it remained in a squalid state of neglect. In 1981, grass was planted on the field and the stadium was opened again. The lighting system was renewed in 1993, after which night games began to be played once more. In the same year, the system of combined tickets was initiated in Turkey at Ali Sami Yen Stadium. Also in the same year, the stadium was furnished with seats to replace the old benches. Standing room at the stadium was thus reduced from a 35,000 seating capacity to 22,000.

=== New stadium project ===
1997, The Galatasaray administration assigned a Canadian architectural firm the job of designing Turkey’s first multi-function, modern stadium to be built in place of Ali Sami Yen Stadı, which was planned to be torn down. The new stadium project was launched in 1998 and it attracted wide interest. During the promotion of the modern loge system, the entire loge section was sold at a symbolical fee.

The search began for funds to finance the construction of the new stadium. Because of the club’s difficult financial situation at the time, the needed funds could not be found. Over the period of 2001-2002, a revision was made in the project with an eye toward reducing the amount needed for financing but this time, although costs were brought down, the economic crisis of 2001 stood in the way of overcoming the financial issue. In the 2003 -2004 season, the old project came up again but was abandoned in favor of building a new and modern stadium. Again, financing needs could not be met.

Because Mecidiyeköy was now a part of the city center, state authorities objected to the expansion of the stadium in this district. A new piece of land was suggested to Galatasaray as an alternative. The search for financing for the new stadium that would be built on this new plot continued over the period 2004-2007.

=== Renovation and new Eski Açık stand ===
After a general renovation that took place in the 2004-2005 season, the club returned to Ali Sami Yen. Following the earthquake of 1999, the old Open Tribune was demolished and replaced in the 2005-2006 season for reasons of safety. In 2007, discussions with state authorities on the construction of a new Galatasaray stadium in Sarıyer yielded positive results. It was decided that the new stadium to be built within two years on the new plot would be transferred to Galatasaray in return for the club's handing over the property on which Ali Sami Yen stood.

=== The final ===
At the end of 2007, ten years after the initial announcement of the project in 1997, the groundbreaking for the new stadium was carried out (December 13, 2007) at a ceremony attended by state officials. The old project was put aside and a new project was contracted to Mete Arat in Germany.

In 2008, Galatasaray’s last year at Ali Sami Yen, the Lower Closed Tribune was renovated in line with UEFA standards. The construction of the new stadium, the Türk Telekom Arena, gained speed when the contracting company was changed in 2009. It was announced that the official opening of the new stadium would take place on January 15, 2010. The new stadium was inaugurated on January 15, 2011.

== Welcome to The Hell / The atmosphere ==
In the past, games were played in front of more than 35,000 spectators in this stadium, which is nicknamed "The Hell" by Galatasaray's supporters because of the sea of red and yellow, intimidating atmosphere and the enthusiastic support of the fans who often make mass use of torches, smoke, drums, flags and giant posters to create visual grandeur and apply psychological pressure on visiting teams. Ali Sami Yen is important for Galatasaray because it saw many victories against renowned European football clubs, such as Barcelona, Real Madrid, Manchester United, Juventus, Milan, Liverpool and many others.

== Location ==
The stadium was located in Mecidiyeköy, one of the most crowded quarters of central Istanbul, surrounded by dense urban development. The new home ground of Galatasaray is the newly built Türk Telekom Arena in the Seyrantepe quarter near Maslak financial district in Şişli. The new stadium, which was opened 15 January 2011, has a capacity of 52,652 seats, making it the largest private stadium owned by a club in Turkey.

== Access ==
Access to Ali Sami Yen was very easy, as the stadium was not far from popular tourist locations such as Taksim Square. There are bus stops for several lines of the Metropolitan Municipality's bus network near where the stadium was situated. The subway station's name is "Şişli/Mecidiyeköy".

== Games and tickets ==
A portion of the stadium, covering around 7,000 to 8,000 seats, were sold annually in the form of season tickets. Average number of fans per game was around 19,000, while the stadium had a capacity of 23,000.

== Stands ==
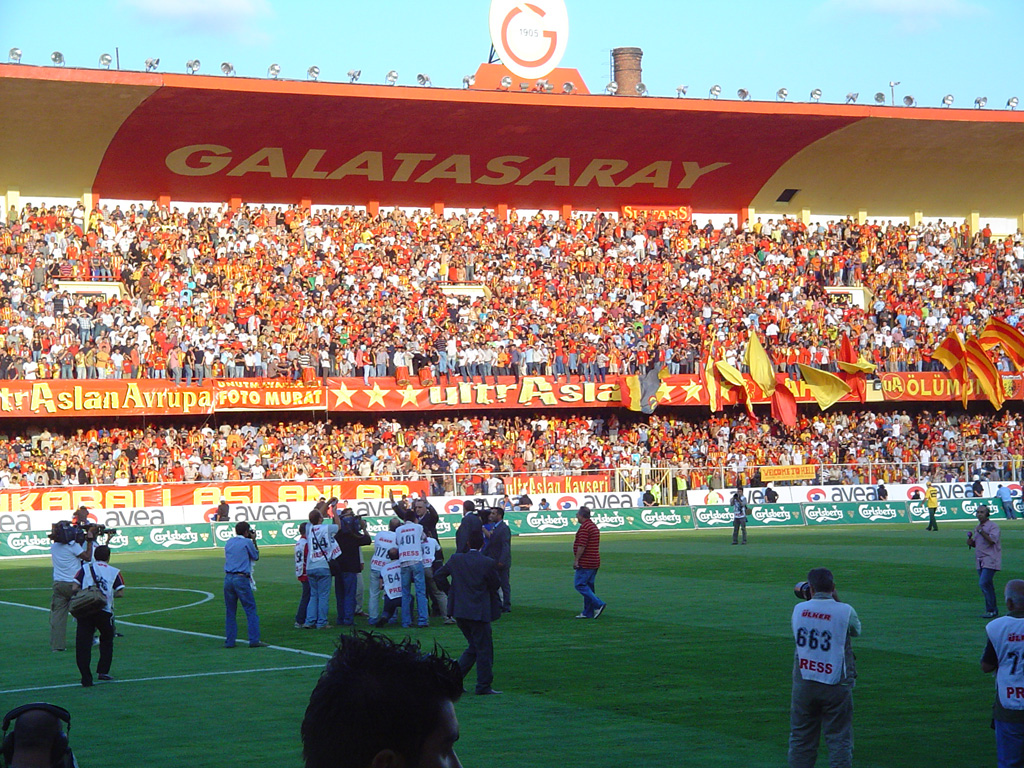
The famous Kapali stand with the GALATASARAY sign and logo

The stadium was made up of two identical lateral stands which were covered by a roof: the Numaralı (Numbered) stand and the Kapalı (Covered) stand. The two other stands, behind the goal gates, were the Yeni Açık (New Open), with two tiers, and the Eski Açık (Old Open), with the electronic scoreboard. The best atmosphere in the stadium was in the Kapalı (Covered) stand, where the most fanatical fans congregated. It had a capacity of 5,528. For more comfort, the Numaralı (Numbered) stand was the best, but this was also the most expensive one. The capacity was 4,351.

The Yeni Açık (New Open) stand had a capacity of 7,869. The stadium's most modern section was the rebuilt Eski Açık (Old Open) stand with a capacity of 6,597 seats.

== Milestones ==
- 1933 Galatasaray buys the plot in Mecidiyeköy
- 1 December 1936 Groundbreaking
- 1940 - 1944 Construction
- 3 September 1944 Stadium opened as "Mecidiyeköy Stadium" and first match: Elektrik vs. Emniyet
- 24 September 1944 First Galatasaray match vs. Süleymaniye (7-0)
- 1945 Construction of a single 15,000 concrete stand
- 1945-1964 Galatasaray used it as a training field
- 1954 Brazil's National Football team used it as training field
- 20 December 1964 Stadium opened as "Ali Sami Yen Stadı" and first match: Turkey vs Bulgaria
- 1965 Floodlights have been installed
- 29 September 1965 First Galatasaray match in the expanded and new called "Ali Sami Yen Stadi" vs. Sion (2-1)
- 1972-1980 Because of the bad pitch stadium is closed
- 1980-1984 Galatasaray plays again at Ali Sami Yen Stadi
- 1984-1986 Because of the new Highway bridge just behind the Yeni Açik stand stadium is closed
- 1993 All-seater. Capacity sinks from 35,000 to 22,800
- February 2005 Demolition of the Eski Açık Stand. Capacity: 17,484
- September 2005 New Eski Açık Stand opens. Capacity rises to 23,785
- 2008 Modernization and renovation of the first tier of the Kapalı Stand. Capacity sinks to 23,447
- 12 January 2011 Last match: Galatasaray 3-1 Beypazarı Şeker (Turkish Cup)

== Quotations ==
- "I've never experienced anything like Galatasaray. Two hours before kick-off, we went out to have a look at the pitch and the stadium was packed! The chanting was brilliant: one side starts, then the other, then quiet, then all of them chanting!" (Ryan Giggs)
- "Nobody can make me believe that there are only 25,000 people in this stadium." (Paolo Maldini)
- "I love this Hell." (Pierluigi Collina)

== Records ==
Attendance Records
Rank	Attendance	Date	Game
1	48,600	20 December 1964	Turkey – Bulgaria
2	36,658	20 November 1983	Galatasaray – Trabzonspor
3	35,845	7 June 1987	Galatasaray – Eskişehirspor
4	35,791	25 October 1981	Galatasaray – Trabzonspor
5	35,664	2 April 1967	Galatasaray – Fenerbahçe
6	35,635	16 October 1983	Galatasaray – Orduspor
7	35,629	13 September 1981	Galatasaray – Boluspor
8	35,531	11 September 1983	Galatasaray – Denizlispor
9	35,505	25 October 1987	Galatasaray – Fenerbahçe
10	35,503	5 June 1983	Galatasaray – Fenerbahçe

== 3D Virtual Tour ==
Ali Sami Yen Stadium 3D Virtual Tour

== The Closure ==
Galatasaray's final game at the stadium was their Turkish Cup match on 11 Jan 2011 against Beypazarı Şekerspor. The team badly wanted to win in order to enter the new stadium, Turk Telekom Arena respectfully. Having been 1-0 behind, goals from captain Arda Turan, defender Servet Çetin and Colin Kazim-Richards made the final score 3-1. The demolition of this stadium began in April 2011.

== The new stadium ==
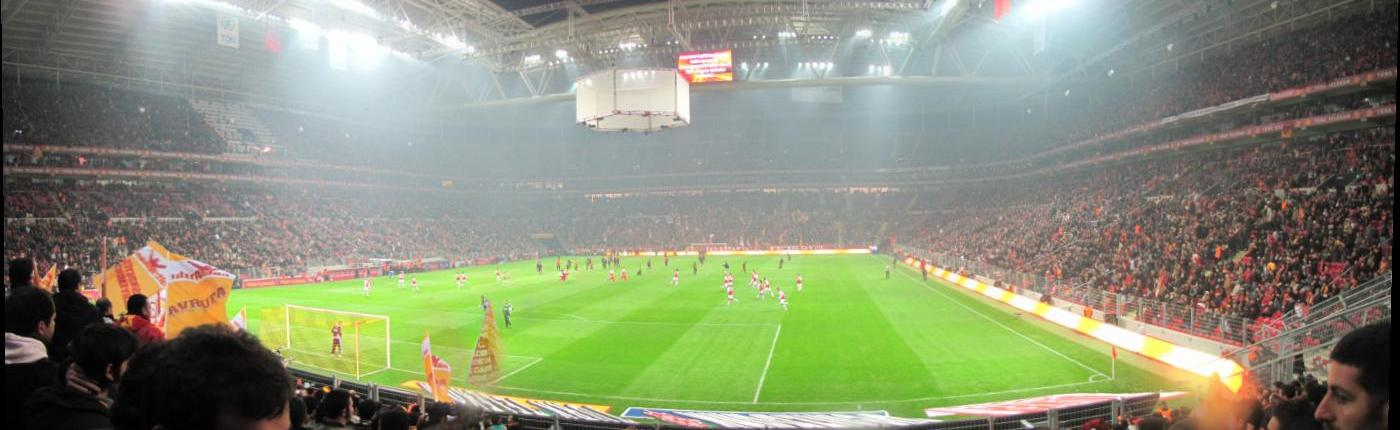
Interior view of the new stadium Rams Park

The new home ground of Galatasaray is the newly built Rams Park in the Seyrantepe quarter near Maslak financial district in Şişli. The plans for the stadium were introduced to the Turkish press on May 11, 2007. The new stadium, which was opened 15 January 2011, has a seating capacity of 52,652 seats, making it the largest private stadium rented by a club in Turkey. The stadium also has its own metro station.

== Recent International matches ==
Date	Result	Opponent	Competition
Turkey national football team
12 October 1994	5-0	Iceland	UEFA Euro 1996 qualifying
14 December 1994	1-2	Switzerland	UEFA Euro 1996 qualifying
10 November 1996	7-0	San Marino	1998 FIFA World Cup qualification
30 April 1997	1-3	Belgium	1998 FIFA World Cup qualification
20 August 1997	6-4	Wales	1998 FIFA World Cup qualification
5 September 1998	3-0	Northern Ireland	UEFA Euro 2000 qualifying
14 October 1998	1-3	Finland	UEFA Euro 2000 qualifying
27 March 1999	2-0	Moldova	UEFA Euro 2000 qualifying
23 February 2000	0-2	Norway	International friendly
2 September 2000	2-0	Moldova	2002 FIFA World Cup qualification
24 March 2001	1-1	Slovakia	2002 FIFA World Cup qualification
5 September 2001	1-2	Sweden	2002 FIFA World Cup qualification
14 November 2001	5-0	Austria	2002 FIFA World Cup qualifying play-off
7 September 2002	3-0	Slovakia	UEFA Euro 2004 qualifying
16 October 2002	5-0	Liechtenstein	UEFA Euro 2004 qualifying
25 March 2005	4-0	Albania	UEFA Euro U-21 qualification
3 June 2005	0-1	Greece	UEFA Euro U-21 qualification
2 September 2005	3-2	Denmark	UEFA Euro U-21 qualification
17 October 2007	0-1	Greece	UEFA Euro 2008 qualifying
21 November 2007	1-0	Bosnia and Herzegovina	UEFA Euro 2008 qualifying
9 September 2008	4-0	Armenia	UEFA Euro U-21 qualification
1 April 2009	1–2	Spain	2010 FIFA World Cup qualification

== Gallery ==
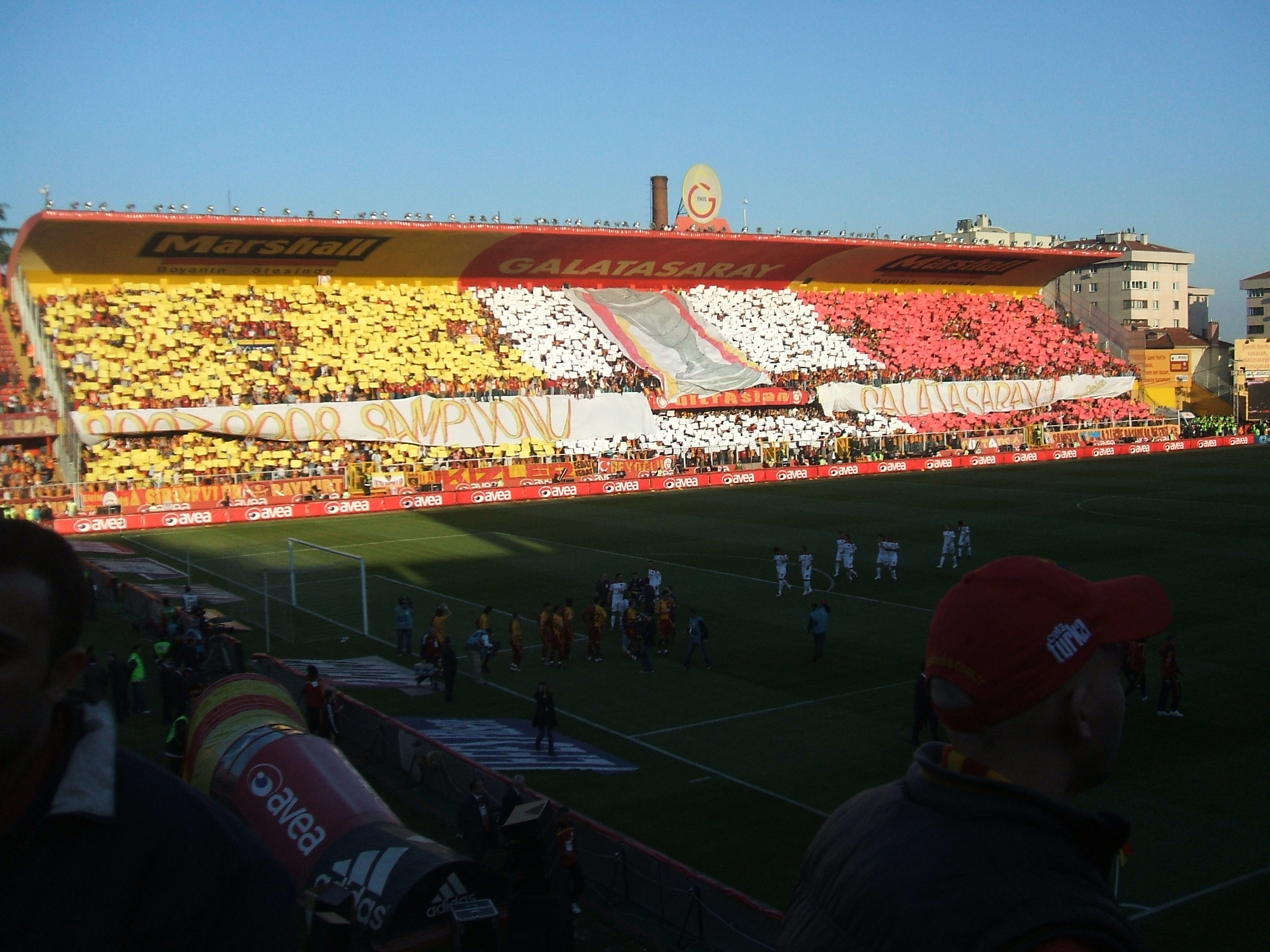
2008 Championship choreo

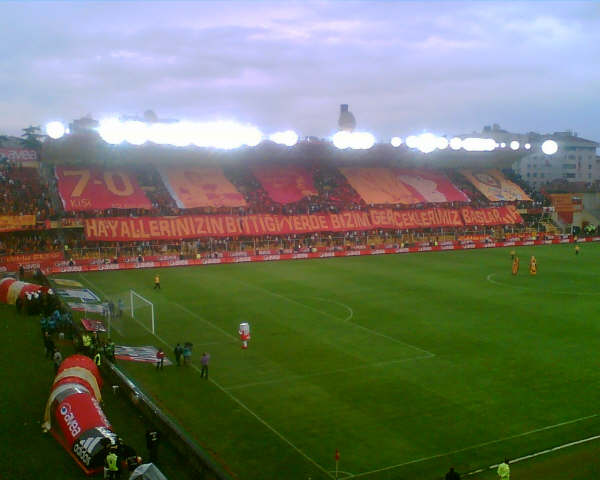
Kıtalar Arası Derbi

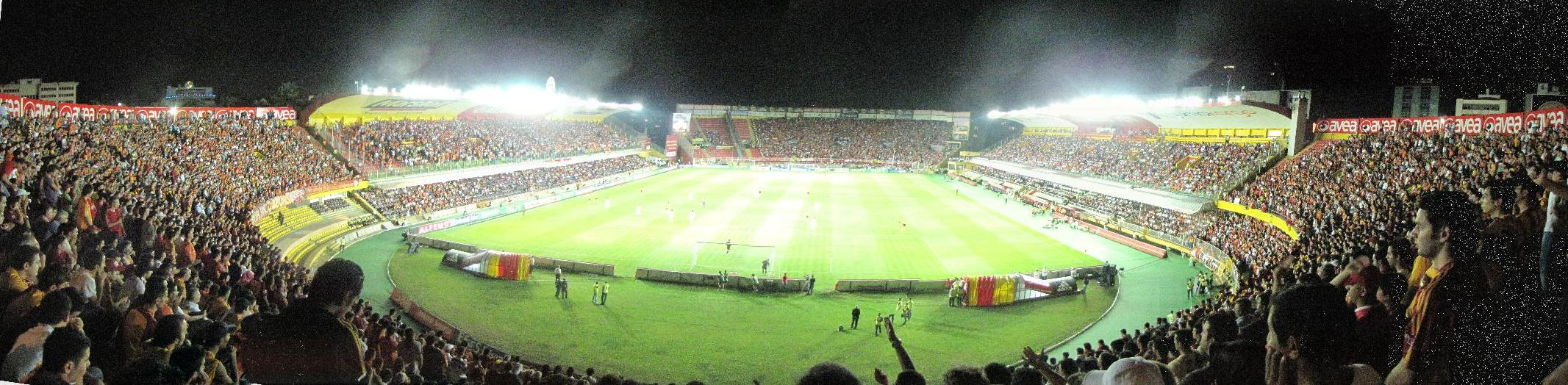
Yeni Açık stand

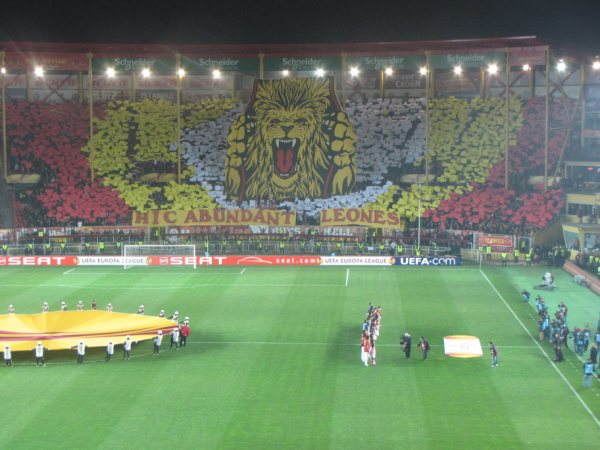
New Eski Açık stand

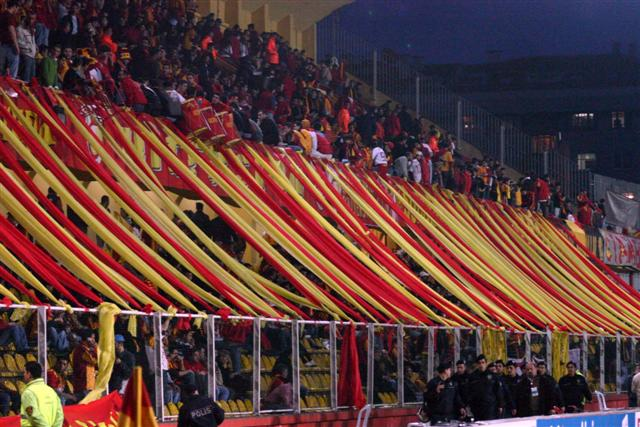
Kıtalar Arası Derbi

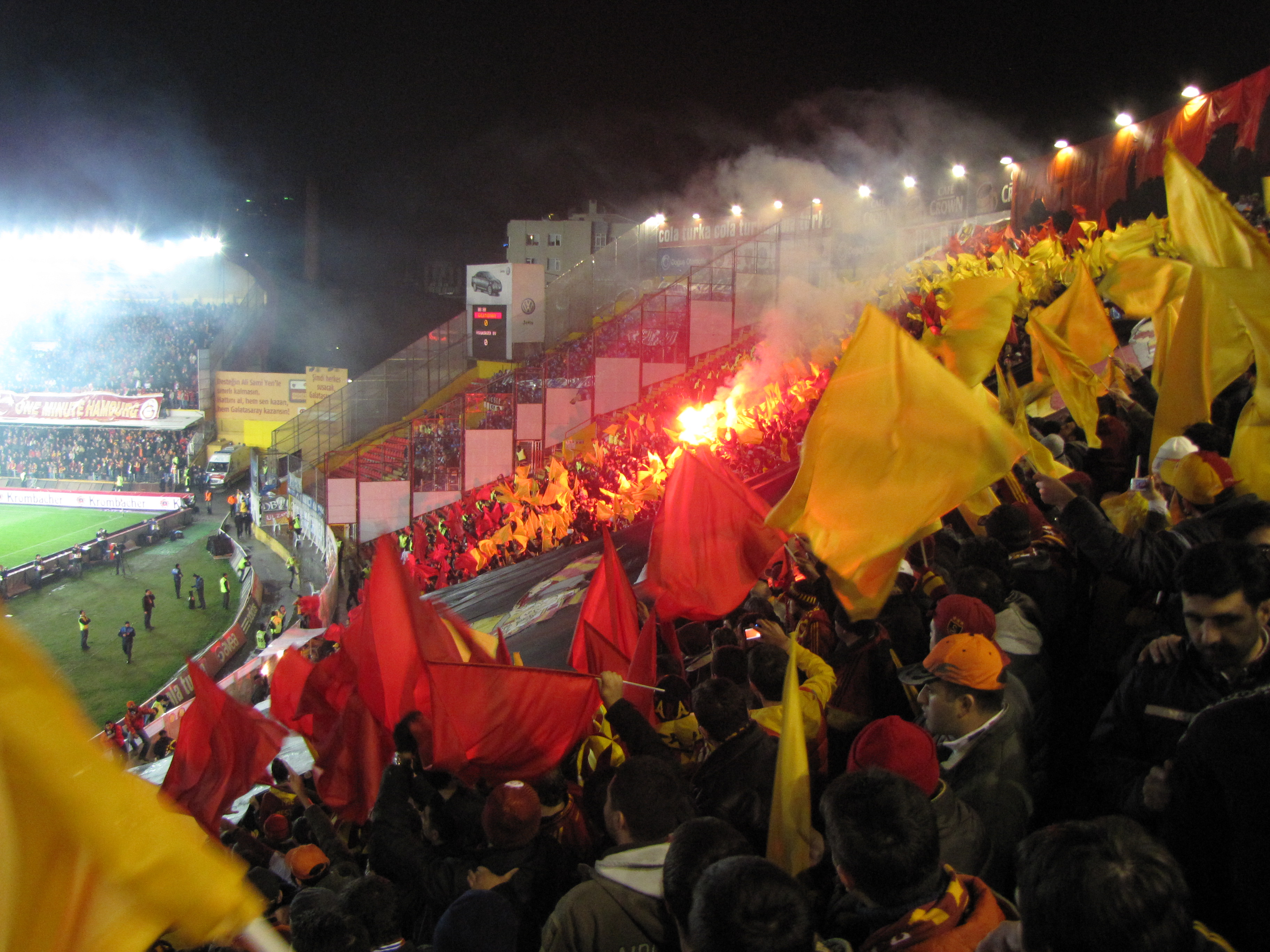
New Eski Açık stand without roof

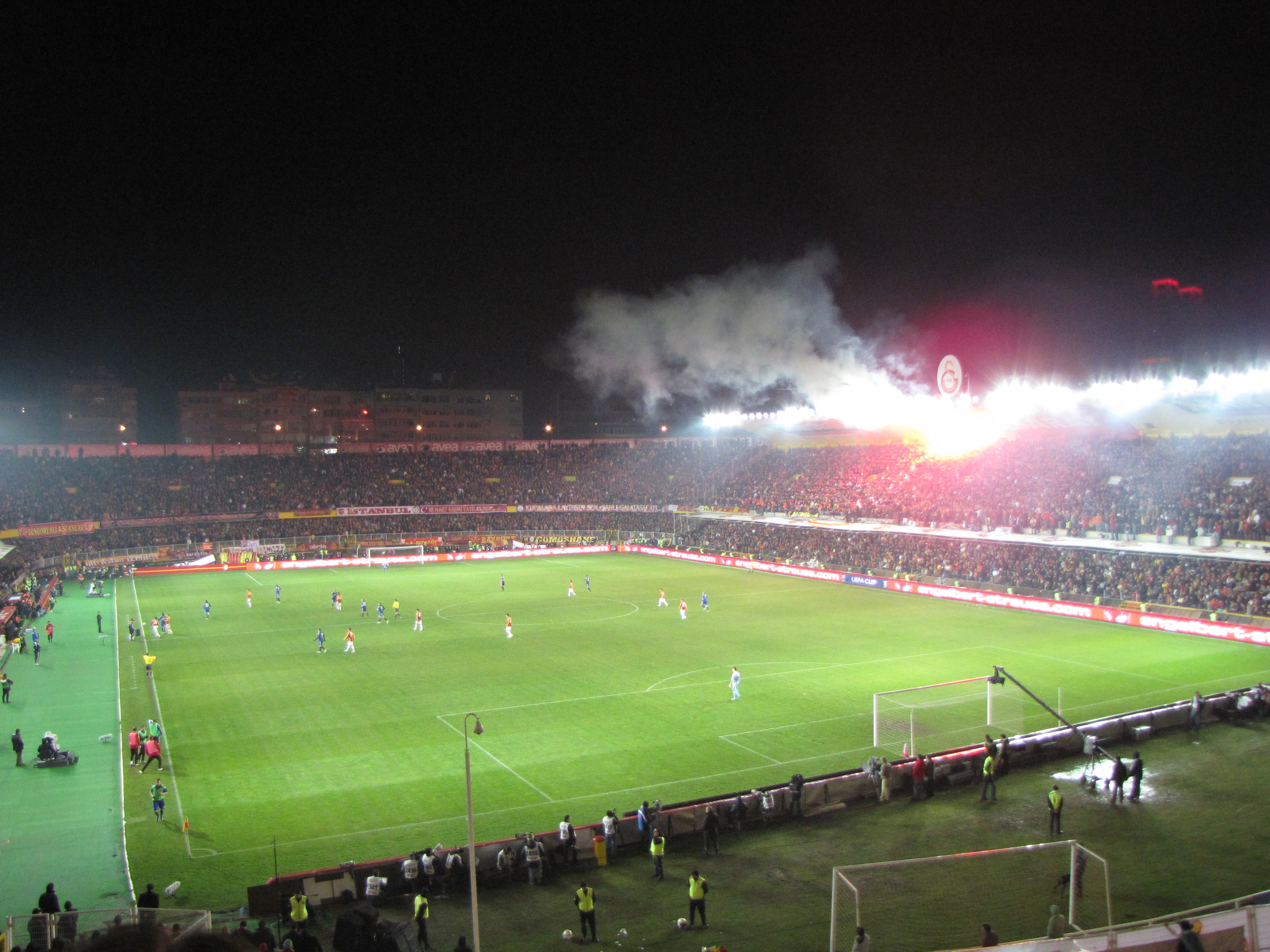
Full house

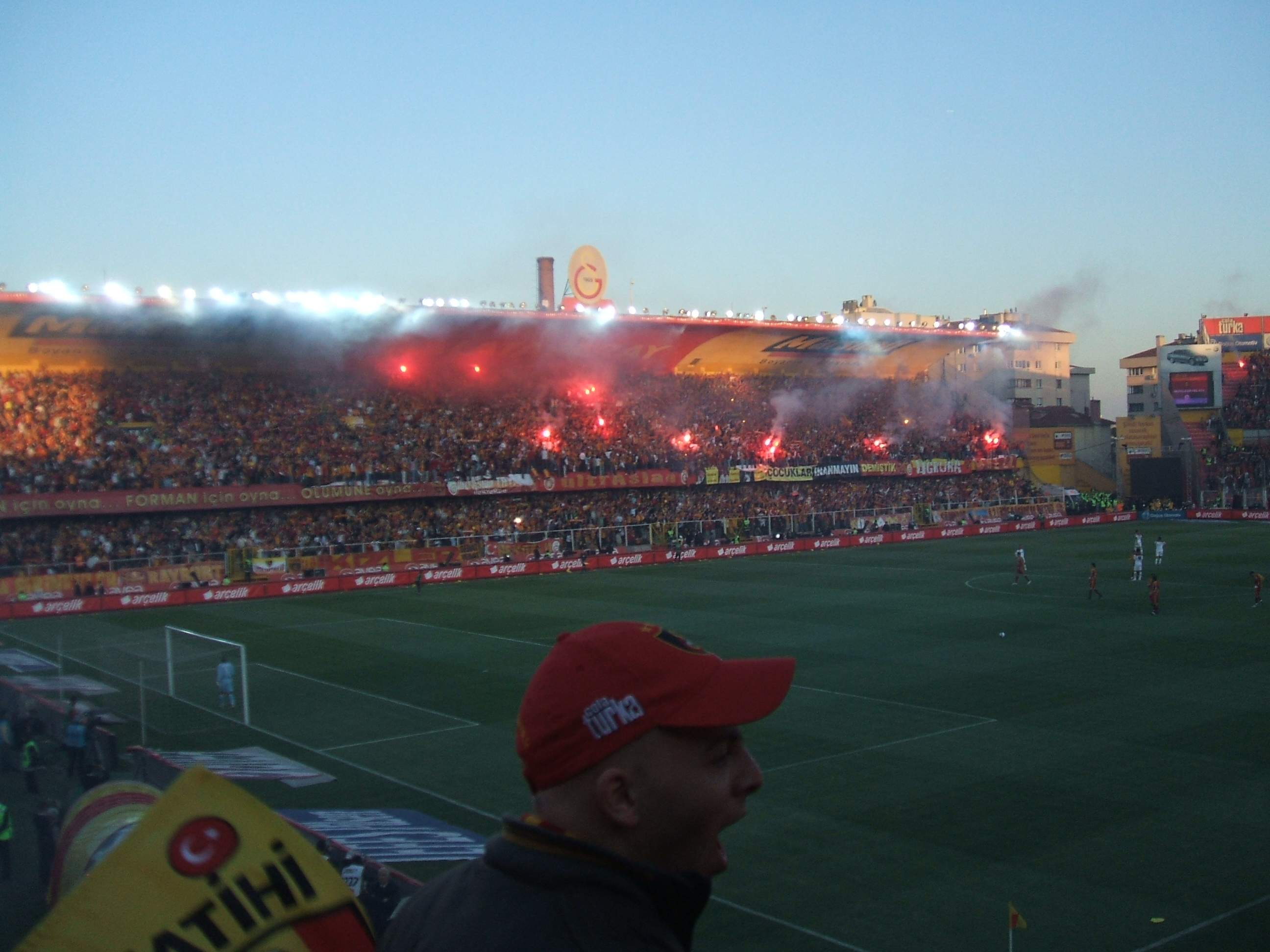
Kapali

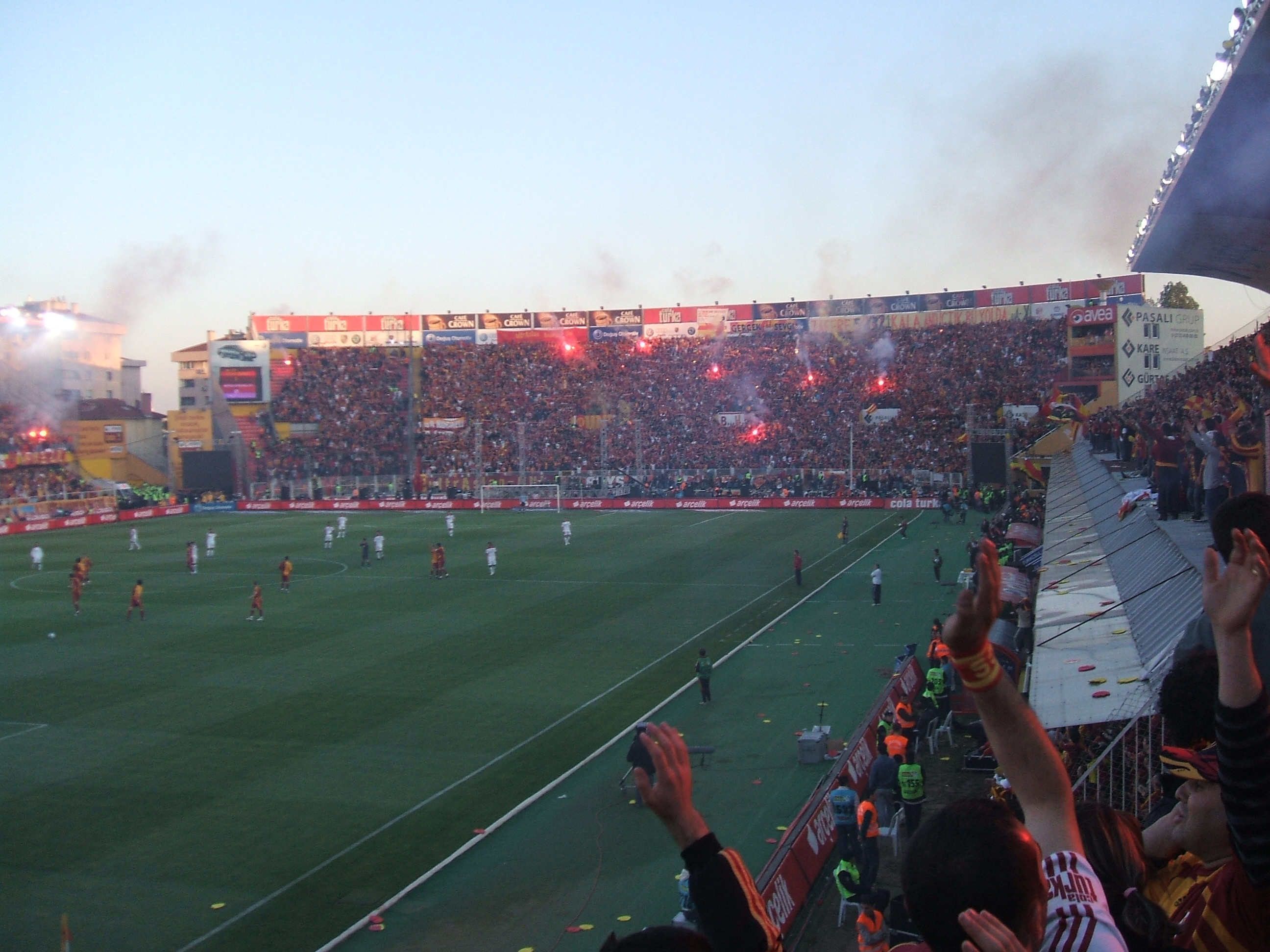
Eski Açık stand

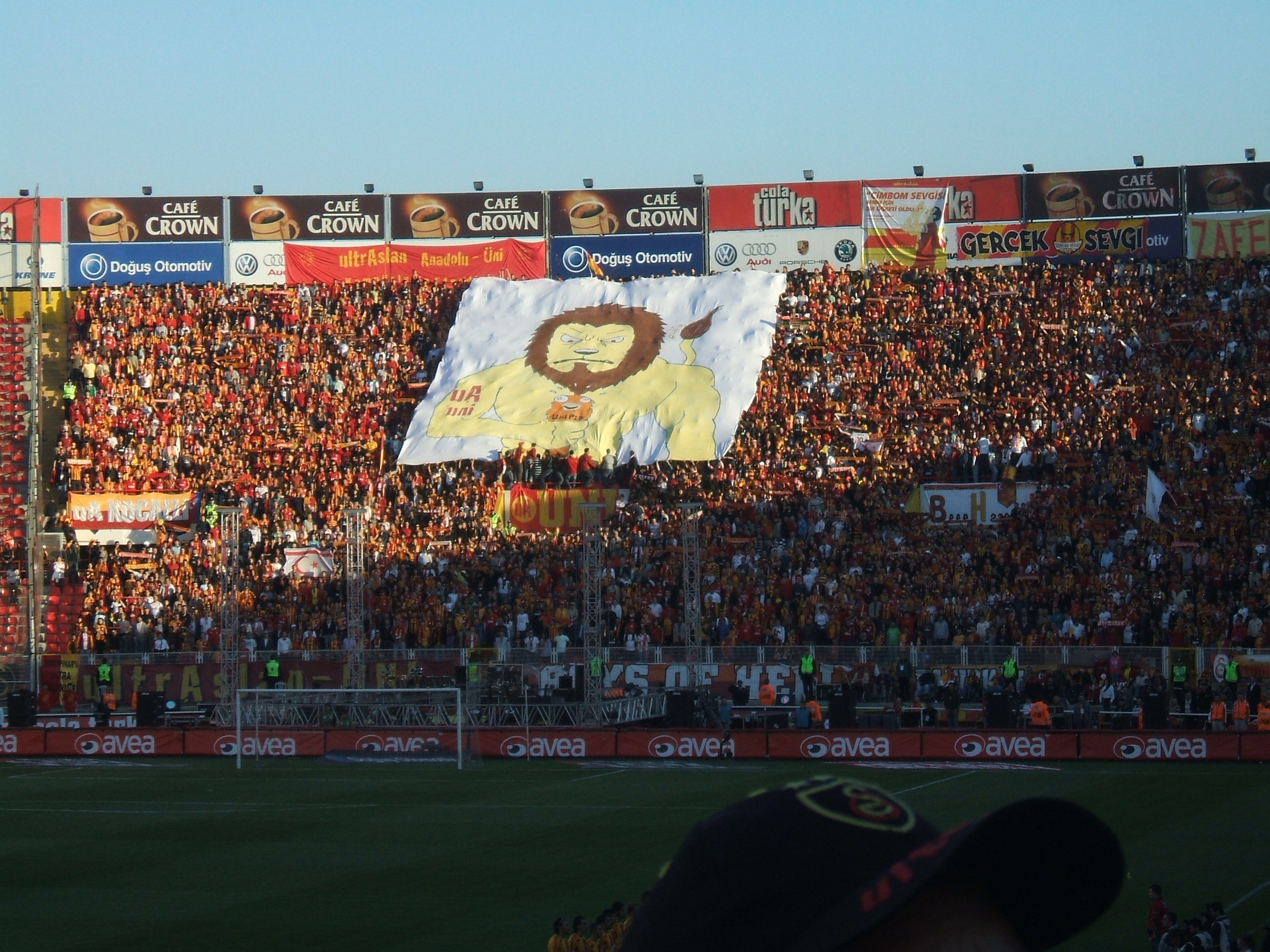
Eski Açık stand

== See also ==
- Rams Park
- Sports in Turkey
- Istanbul
