= Samsun 19 May Stadium (1975) =

Football stadium in Canik, Turkey

- Samsun 19 Mayıs Stadyumu
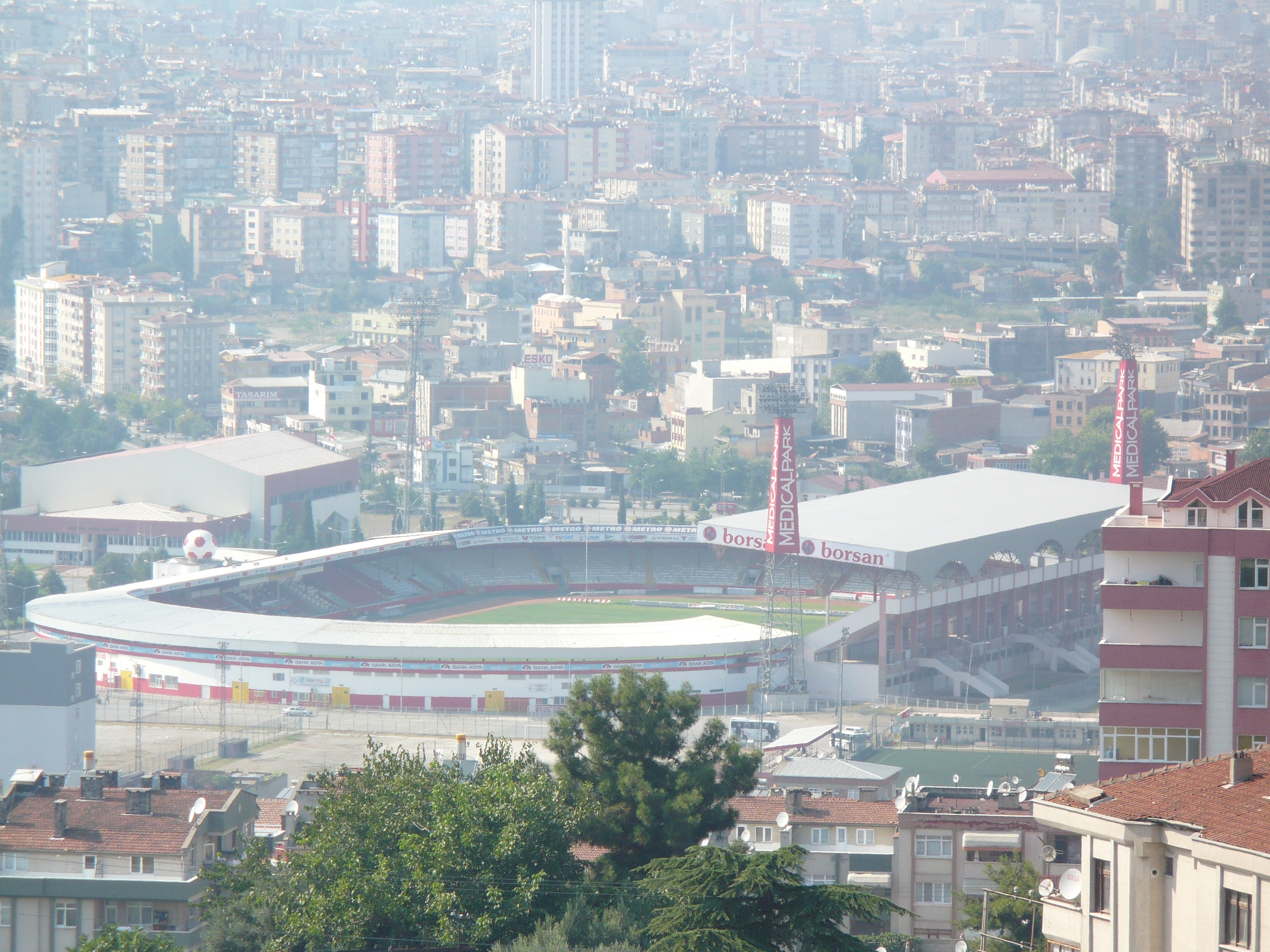
- Aerial view of the stadium in August 2011

- Location of the stadium in Turkey.
- Location: Canik, Samsun, Turkey
- Coordinates: 41°16′12″N 36°21′21″E
- Capacity: 16,480
- Surface: Grass

Construction
- Groundbreaking: 1970
- Opened: February 23, 1975
- Renovated: 2008
- Expanded: 2008
- Closed: 2017
- Demolished: 2018

Tenant
- Samsunspor (1975–2017)

Samsun 19 May Stadium (Turkish: Samsun 19 Mayıs Stadyumu), also known as Canik 19 May Stadium (Turkish: Canik 19 Mayıs Stadyumu) from 2017 until its demolition in 2018, was a multi-purpose stadium in the Canik district of Samsun, northern Turkey. It was used mostly for football matches and was the home ground of Samsunspor until the new Samsun 19 May Stadium was opened in 2017. The stadium had a seating capacity for 16,480 spectators. It was demolished in 2018.

The stadium was named in remembrance of the landing of Mustafa Kemal Pasha (1881–1938) in Samsun on May 19, 1919, to start the national independence movement.

== Renovation ==
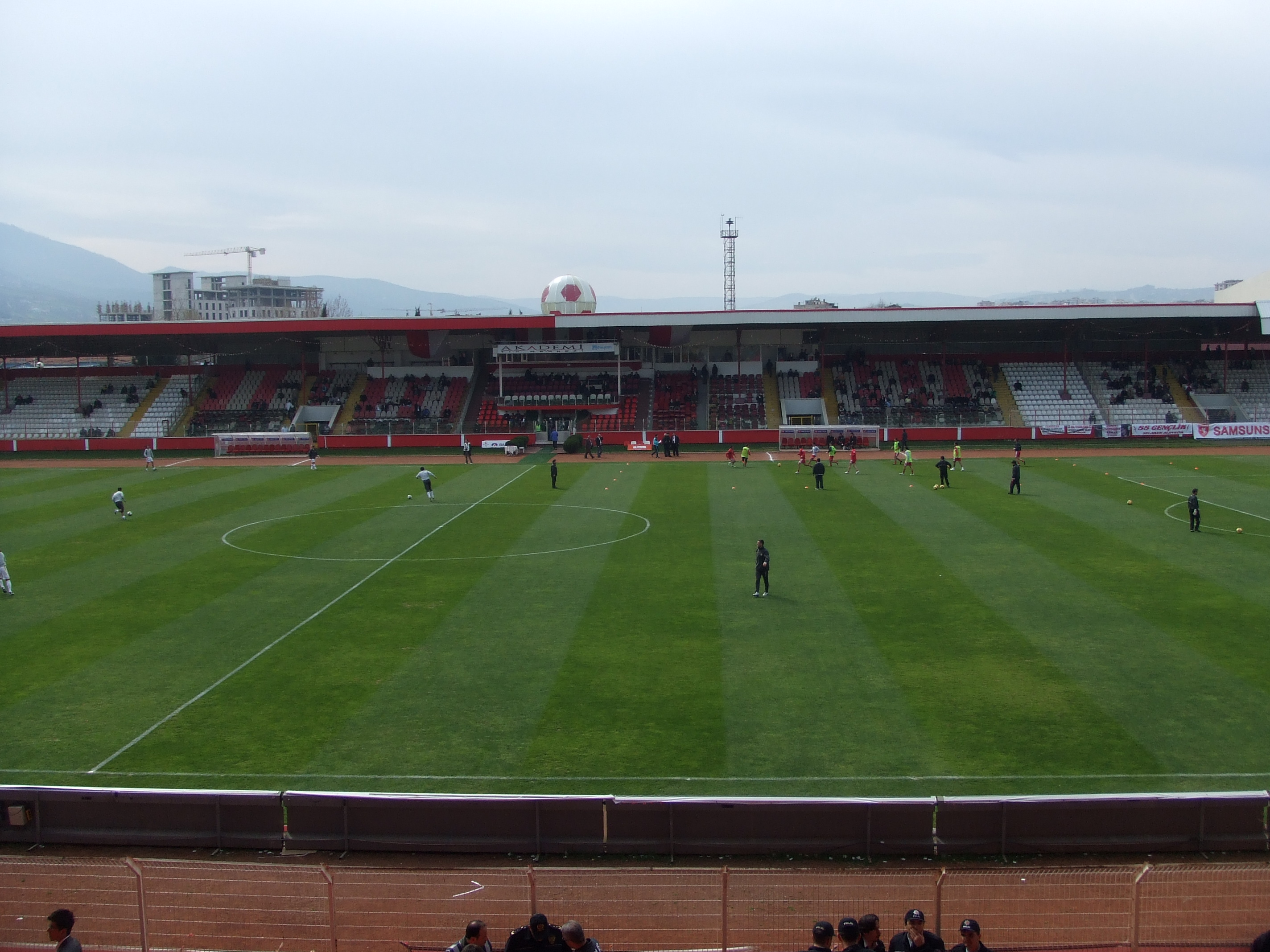
Interior of the stadium, pictured in March 2009.

In 2006 the club decided to renovate the ground. The capacity was increased by several thousand by adding a second tier to the maraton stand, and all the seats were covered with a roof. The renovation increased the capacity to 16,480.

== International events hosted ==
The venue went onto host the football events of the 2017 Summer Deaflympics.
