= Bozkurt =

Bozkurt is a Turkish word literally meaning "grey wolf" and it may refer to:

== Surname ==
- Abdullah Bozkurt (born 1971), Turkish journalist
- Ahmet Bozkurt (born 1977), Turkish poet, essayist and novelist
- Burhan Bozkurt (1934–2013), Turkish wrestler
- Cengiz Bozkurt (born 1964), Turkish actor
- Demet Bozkurt (born 1996), Turkish women's footballer
- Deniz Bozkurt (born 1993), American footballer
- Dursun Bozkurt (1925–1992), Turkish alpine skier
- Emine Bozkurt (born 1967), Dutch politician of Turkish descent
- Erbil Bozkurt (born 1990), English footballer and coach
- Fatih Bozkurt (born 2000), Turkish wrestler
- Gizem Bozkurt (born 1993), Turkish swimmer
- Gülsen Bozkurt (born 1950), Turkish Cypriot politician and doctor
- Hasret Bozkurt (born 2001), Turkish female judoka
- Mahmut Esat Bozkurt (1892–1943), Turkish lawyer and politician
- Osman Bozkurt (born 1994), Austrian footballer
- Sakin Bozkurt (born 1967), Turkish trance musician and DJ
- Serdar Bozkurt (born 1977), Turkish footballer and manager
- Tuba Bozkurt (born 1983), German politician
- Ümit Bozkurt (born 1976), Turkish footballer

== First name ==
- Bozkurt Aran (born 1947), Turkish diplomat and academic
- Bozkurt Beg, or Ala al-Dawla Bozkurt (died 1515), Beg of Dulkadir
- Bozkurt İlham Gençer (1925–2023), Turkish jazz musician

== Places ==
- Bozkurt, Denizli, district in Denizli Province, Turkey
- Bozkurt, Kastamonu, district in Kastamonu Province, Turkey

== See also ==
- Bozkurtlar, or Grey Wolves (organization), a Turkish far-right wing organisation
