= Turkish football clubs in European competitions =

- Points by season (UEFA coefficient)
Season	Points
2002–03	3.080
2003–04	4.290
2004–05	3.547
2005–06	2.640
2006–07	4.026
2007–08	9.750
2008–09	7.000
2009–10	7.600
2010–11	4.600
2011–12	5.100
2012–13	10.200
2013–14	6.700
2014–15	6.000
2015–16	6.600
2016–17	9.700
2017–18	6.800
2018–19	5.500
2019–20	5.000
2020–21	3.100
2021–22	6.700
2022–23	11.800
2023–24	12.000
2024–25	10.300
Sum of the last 5 years	43.900

Turkish football clubs have participated in European football competitions since 1956, when Galatasaray took part in the European Cup. In total, 34 Turkish clubs have participated in European competitions to date. The greatest success was achieved when Galatasaray won the UEFA Cup and UEFA Super Cup in 2000.

== Achievements ==
Club	UEFA Super Cup	European Cup / UEFA Champions League		UEFA Cup / Europa League			UEFA Conference League	UEFA Cup Winners' Cup
Club	Winner	Semi-finalist	Quarter-finalist	Winner	Semi-finalist	Quarter-finalist	Quarter-finalist	Quarter-finalist
Galatasaray	2000	1989	1963, 1970, 1994^{‡}, 2001, 2013	2000	—	—	—	1992
Fenerbahçe	—	—	2008	—	2013	—	2024	1964
Beşiktaş	—	—	1987	—	—	2003, 2017	—	—
Bursaspor	—	—	—	—	—	—	—	1975
Göztepe	—	—	—	—	1969^{#}	—	—	1970

^{‡ Galatasaray was one of the final eight teams of the 1993–94 UEFA Champions League group stage.}
^{# Inter–Cities Fairs Cup}

== Overall standing in UEFA competitions ==
As of 21 October 2026

Rank	Club	Pld	W	D	L	GF	GA	GD	W%	Pts	First Appearance	Last Appearance	Ref.
1	Galatasaray	343	122	90	131	474	527	−53	35.57	456	1956–57 EC	2026–27 UEFA Champions League	
2	Fenerbahçe	309	122	69	118	420	435	−15	39.48	435	1959–60 EC	2026–27 UEFA Champions League	
3	Beşiktaş	266	104	50	112	363	399	−36	39.10	362	1958–59 EC	2026–27 UEFA Europa League	
4	Trabzonspor	157	57	39	61	198	212	−14	36.31	210	1976–77 EC	2026–27 UEFA Conference League	
5	İstanbul Başakşehir	69	26	17	26	103	98	+5	37.68	95	2015–16 UEL	2026–27 UEFA Conference League	
6	Bursaspor	32	10	9	13	41	50	−9	31.25	39	1974–75 CWC	2014–15 UEFA Europa League	
7	Sivasspor	30	10	4	16	34	55	−21	33.33	34	2008 UIC	2022–23 UEFA Europa Conference League	
8	Ankaraspor	16	9	3	4	24	16	+8	56.25	30	2005 UIC	2016–17 UEFA Europa League	
9	Gaziantepspor	20	7	8	5	25	17	+8	35.00	29	1996 UIC	2011–12 UEFA Europa League	
10	Gençlerbirliği	20	8	4	8	28	22	+6	40.00	28	1987–88 CWC	2004–05 UEFA Cup	
11	Samsunspor	18	9	2	7	26	20	+6	50.00	26	1997 UIC	2025–26 UEFA Conference League	
12	Kocaelispor	18	5	5	8	15	23	−8	27.78	20	1993–94 UC	2002–03 UEFA Cup	
13	Antalyaspor	12	6	1	5	18	17	+1	50.00	19	1996 UIC	2000–01 UEFA Cup	
14	Altay	14	5	3	6	21	27	−6	35.71	18	1967–68 CWC	1998 UEFA Intertoto Cup	
15	İstanbulspor	8	5	1	2	16	10	+6	62.50	16	1997 UIC	1998–99 UEFA Cup	
16	Kayserispor	10	4	4	2	15	10	+5	40.00	16	2006 UIC	2008–09 UEFA Cup	
17	Konyaspor	16	3	5	8	14	23	−9	18.75	14	2016–17 UEL	2022–23 UEFA Europa Conference League	
18	Göztepe	10	4	1	5	14	10	+4	40.00	13	1969–70 CWC	1970–71 CWC	
19	Denizlispor	10	3	2	5	12	18	−6	30.00	11	2001 UIC	2002–03 UC	
20	Adana Demirspor	6	3	1	2	12	8	+4	50.00	10	2023–24 UECL	2023–24 UECL	
21	MKE Ankaragücü	12	3	1	8	5	21	−16	25.00	10	1972–73 CWC	2002–03 UC	
22	Eskişehirspor	14	2	4	8	10	21	−11	14.29	10	1971–72 CWC	2012–13 UEL	
23	Yeni Malatyaspor	4	2	1	1	5	5	+0	50.00	7	2019–20 UEL	2019–20 UEL	
24	Kardemir Karabükspor	4	1	2	1	2	2	+0	25.00	5	2014–15 UEL	2014–15 UEL	
25	Kayseri Erciyesspor	4	1	1	2	4	11	−7	25.00	4	2007–08 UC	2007–08 UC	
26	Adanaspor	6	1	1	4	6	20	−14	16.67	4	1976–77 UC	1981–82 UC	
27	Malatyaspor	2	1	0	1	2	3	−1	50.00	3	2003–04 UC	2003–04 UC	
28	Orduspor	2	1	0	1	2	6	−4	50.00	3	1979–80 UC	1979–80 UC	
29	Sakaryaspor	4	1	0	3	3	7	−4	25.00	3	1988–89 CWC	1988–89 CWC	
30	Mersin İdman Yurdu	2	0	1	1	0	1	−1	0.00	1	1983–84 CWC	1983–84 CWC	
31	Akhisarspor	6	0	1	5	4	14	−10	0.00	1	2018–19 UEL	2018–19 UEL	
32	Alanyaspor	1	0	0	1	0	1	−1	0.00	0	2020–21 UEL	2020–21 UEL	
33	Çaykur Rizespor	2	0	0	2	1	4	−3	0.00	0	2001 UIC	2001 UIC	
34	Boluspor	2	0	0	2	0	4	−4	0.00	0	1974–75 UC	1974–75 UC	
Total		1,392	506	321	565	1,829	2,036	−207	36.35	1828			

Legend: GF = Goals For. GA = Goals Against. GD = Goal Difference. EC = European Cup; UCL = UEFA Champions League; UC = UEFA Cup; UEL = UEFA Europa League; UECL = UEFA Conference League; CWC = UEFA Cup Winners' Cup; UIC = UEFA Intertoto Cup.

== Appearances in UEFA Super Cup ==
=== Overall ===
Club	Played	W	D	L	GF	GA	GD	W%
Galatasaray	1	1	0	0	2	1	+1	100.00
Total	1	1	0	0	2	1	+1	100.00

=== UEFA Super Cup Performances ===
Year	Club	Score	Opponents	Venue(s)
2000	Galatasaray	2–1 (a.s.d.e.t.)	(Spain) Real Madrid	Stade Louis II, Monaco

== Appearances in UEFA Champions League ==
=== Chronological order of participations ===
As of 1 September 2026

Club	92–93	93–94	94–95	95–96	96–97	97–98	98–99	99–00	00–01	01–02	02–03	03–04	04–05	05–06	06–07	07–08	08–09	09–10	10–11	11–12	12–13	13–14	14–15	15–16	16–17	17–18	18–19	19–20	20–21	21–22	22–23	23–24	24–25	25–26	26–27
Galatasaray (19)	•	GS	GS	•	•	GS	GS	GS	QF	GS2	GS	GS	•	•	GS	•	•	•	•	•	QF	R16	GS	GS	•	•	GS	GS	•	•	•	GS	•	R16	
Beşiktaş (8)	•	•	•	•	•	GS	•	•	GS	•	•	GS	•	•	•	GS	•	GS	•	•	•	•	•	•	GS	R16	•	•	•	GS	•	•	•	•	•
Fenerbahçe (7)	•	•	•	•	GS	•	•	•	•	GS	•	•	GS	GS	•	QF	GS	•	•	•	•	•	•	•	•	•	•	•	•	•	•	•	•	•	
Bursaspor (1)	•	•	•	•	•	•	•	•	•	•	•	•	•	•	•	•	•	•	GS	•	•	•	•	•	•	•	•	•	•	•	•	•	•	•	•
Trabzonspor (1)	•	•	•	•	•	•	•	•	•	•	•	•	•	•	•	•	•	•	•	GS	•	•	•	•	•	•	•	•	•	•	•	•	•	•	•
İstanbul Başakşehir (1)	•	•	•	•	•	•	•	•	•	•	•	•	•	•	•	•	•	•	•	•	•	•	•	•	•	•	•	•	GS	•	•	•	•	•	•

QF	Eliminated in the quarter-finals
R16	Eliminated in round of 16 (from 2003–04 onwards)
GS2	Eliminated in the second group stage (from 1999–2000 to 2002–03)
GS; LP	Eliminated in the group stage / league phase
•	Did not participate in the group stage / league phase

=== Standings ===
As of 21 October 2026

Rank	Club	Pld	W	D	L	GF	GA	GD	W%	Pts	Ref.
1	Galatasaray	137	35	32	70	145	239	−94	25.55	**137**	
2	Beşiktaş	50	13	9	28	46	102	−56	26.00	**48**	
3	Fenerbahçe	45	11	9	25	46	80	−34	24.44	**42**	
4	Trabzonspor	8	1	5	2	4	7	−3	12.50	**8**	
5	İstanbul Başakşehir	6	1	0	5	7	18	−11	16.67	**3**	
6	Bursaspor	6	0	1	5	2	16	−14	0.00	**1**	
Total		**250**	**60**	**56**	**134**	**250**	**458**	**−208**	**24.00**	239	

Legend: GF = Goals For. GA = Goals Against. GD = Goal Difference.

Note: Matches played before group and league stage are not included.

=== Positions in league phase (2024–present) ===
Club	24–25	25–26	26–27
Galatasaray	•	20th	
Fenerbahçe	•	•	

=== Positions in group stage (1992–2024) ===
Club	Galatasaray	Beşiktaş	Fenerbahçe	Trabzonspor	Bursaspor	İstanbul Başakşehir	Total
1st Place	•	1	•	•	•	•	**1**
2nd Place	6	•	1	•	•	•	**7**
3rd Place	5	3	2	1	•	•	**11**
4th Place	8	4	3	•	1	1	**17**
**Total**	**19**‡	**8**	**6**	**1**	**1**	**1**	**36**

W	Winners
R	Runners-up

_{‡ Includes double group stages in 2000–01 and 2001–02 UCL seasons.}

=== UEFA Champions League/European Cup performances ===
Note: Clubs in bold won the corresponding competition that season.

Season	Club	Progress	Score	Opponents	Venue(s)
1955–56	None entered				
1956–57	Galatasaray	Preliminary round	3–4	(Romania) Dinamo București	1–3 at 23 August Stadium; 2–1 at Ali Sami Yen Stadium
1957–58	None entered				
1958–59	Beşiktaş	First round	1–3	**(Spain) Real Madrid**	0–2 at Santiago Bernabéu; 1–1 at Mithat Paşa Stadium
1959–60	Fenerbahçe	First round	4–8^{1}	(France) Nice	2–1 at Mithat Paşa Stadyumu; 1–2 at Stade Municipal du Ray; 1–5 at Stade des Charmilles
1960–61	Beşiktaş	Preliminary round	1–4	(Austria) Rapid Wien	0–4 at Praterstadion; 1–0 at Mithat Paşa Stadium
1961–62	Fenerbahçe	First round	1–3	(Germany) 1. FC Nürnberg	1–2 at Mithat Paşa Stadyumu; 0–1 at Städtisches Stadium
1962–63	Galatasaray	Quarter-finals	1–8	**(Italy) Milan**	1–3 at Mithat Paşa Stadyumu; 0–5 at San Siro
1963–64	Galatasaray	First Round	2–2^{2}	(Switzerland) Zürich	0–2 at Letzigrund; 2–0 at Mecidiyeköy Stadı
1964–65	Fenerbahçe	Preliminary round	1–4	(Netherlands) DWS	1–3 at Olympisch Stadium; 0–1 at Mithat Paşa Stadyumu
1965–66	Fenerbahçe	Preliminary round	1–5	(Belgium) Anderlecht	0–0 at Mithat Paşa Stadyumu; 1–5 at Émile Versé Stadium
1966–67	Beşiktaş	First round	1–4	(Netherlands) Ajax	0–2 at Olympisch Stadion; 1–2 at Mithat Paşa Stadium
1967–68	Beşiktaş	First round	0–4	(Austria) Rapid Wien	0–1 at Mithat Paşa Stadium; 0–3 at Praterstadion
1968–69	Fenerbahçe	Second round	0–4	(Netherlands) Ajax	0–2 at Olympisch Stadion; 0–2 at Mithat Paşa Stadyumu
1969–70	Galatasaray	Quarter-finals	1–3	(Poland) Legia Warsaw	1–1 at Mithat Paşa Stadyumu; 0–2 at Stadion Wojska Polskiego
1970–71	Fenerbahçe	First round	0–5	(East Germany) Carl Zeiss Jena	0–4 at Fenerbahçe Stadyumu; 0–1 at Ernst-Abbe-Sportfeld
1971–72	Galatasaray	First round	1–4	(Soviet Union) CSKA Moscow	1–1 at Mithat Paşa Stadyumu; 0–3 at Central Stadium Vladimir Lenin
1972–73	Galatasaray	First round	1–7	(West Germany) Bayern Munich	1–1 at Mithat Paşa Stadyumu; 0–6 at Olympiastadion
1973–74	Galatasaray	First round	0–1 (a.e.t.)	(Spain) Atlético Madrid	0–0 at Vicente Calderón; 0–1 at İnönü Stadyumu
1974–75	Fenerbahçe	Second round	1–4	(Poland) Ruch Chorzów	1–2 at Stadion Miejski w Chorzowie; 0–2 at İnönü Stadium
1975–76	Fenerbahçe	First round	1–7	(Portugal) Benfica	7–0 at Estadio da Luz; 1–0 at Alsancak Stadyumu
1976–77	Trabzonspor	Second round	1–3	**(England) Liverpool**	1–0 at Hüseyin Avni Aker Stadium; 0–3 at Anfield
1977–78	Trabzonspor	First round	1–2	(Denmark) Boldklubben 1903	1–0 at Hüseyin Avni Aker Stadyumu; 0–2 at Københavns Idrætspark
1978–79	Fenerbahçe	First round	3–7	(Netherlands) PSV Eindhoven	2–1 at Şükrü Saracoğlu Stadium; 1–6 at Philips Stadion
1979–80	Trabzonspor	First round	0–2	(Socialist Federal Republic of Yugoslavia) Hajduk Split	0–1 at Stadion Poljud; 0–1 at Hüseyin Avni Aker Stadyumu
1980–81	Trabzonspor	First round	2–4	(Poland) Szombierki Bytom	2–1 at Hüseyin Avni Aker Stadyumu; 0–3 at Stadion Szombierek
1981–82	Trabzonspor	First round	1–2	(Soviet Union) Dynamo Kyiv	1–0 at Republican Stadium; 1–1 at Hüseyin Avni Aker Stadyumu
1982–83	Beşiktaş	First round	1–3	(England) Aston Villa	1–3 at Villa Park; 0–0 at İnönü Stadyumu
1983–84	Fenerbahçe	First round	0–5	(Czechoslovakia) Bohemians Prague	0–1 at Fenerbahçe Stadyumu; 0–4 at Ďolíček
1984–85	Trabzonspor	First round	1–3	(Soviet Union) Dnipro Dnipropetrovsk	1–0 at Hüseyin Avni Aker Stadyumu; 0–3 at Stadion Metalurh
1985–86	Fenerbahçe	Second round	2–5	(Sweden) IFK Göteborg	0–4 at Ullevi; 2–1 at Fenerbahçe Stadyumu
1986–87	Beşiktaş	Quarter-finals	0–7	(Soviet Union) Dynamo Kyiv	0–5 at İzmir Atatürk Stadium; 0–2 at Republican Stadium
1987–88	Galatasaray	First round	2–3	**(Netherlands) PSV Eindhoven**	0–3 at Philips Stadion; 2–0 at Ali Sami Yen Stadium
1988–89	Galatasaray	Semi-finals	1–5	(Romania) Steaua București	0–4 at Stadionul Steaua; 1–1 at İzmir Atatürk Stadium
1989–90	Fenerbahçe	First round	2–5	(Czechoslovakia) Sparta Prague	1–3 at Stadion Letná; 1–2 at Fenerbahçe Stadium
1990–91	Beşiktaş	First round	4–5	(Sweden) Malmö FF	2–3 at Malmö Stadion; 2–2 at İnönü Stadium
1991–92	Beşiktaş	First round	2–3	(Netherlands) PSV Eindhoven	1–1 at İnönü Stadium; 1–2 at Philips Stadion
1992–93	Beşiktaş	First round	2–3	(Sweden) IFK Göteborg	0–2 at Elland Road; 2–1 at BJK İnönü Stadium
1993–94	Galatasaray	4th in group stage	N/A	(Spain) Barcelona, (France) Monaco, (Russia) Spartak Moscow	
1994–95	Galatasaray	4th in group stage	N/A	(Sweden) IFK Göteborg, (Spain) Barcelona, (England) Manchester United	
1995–96	Beşiktaş	Preliminary round	3–4	(Norway) Rosenborg	0–3 at Lerkendal Stadion; 3–1 at BJK İnönü Stadium
1996–97	Fenerbahçe	3rd in group stage	N/A	(Italy) Juventus, (England) Manchester United, (Austria) Rapid Wien	
1997–98	Galatasaray	4th in group stage	N/A	(Germany) Borussia Dortmund, (Italy) Parma, (Czech Republic) Sparta Prague	
1997–98	Beşiktaş	3rd in group stage	N/A	(Germany) Bayern Munich, (France) Paris Saint-Germain, (Sweden) IFK Göteborg	
1998–99	Galatasaray	2nd in group stage	N/A	(Italy) Juventus, (Norway) Rosenborg, (Spain) Athletic Bilbao	
1999–2000	Galatasaray	3rd in first group stage	N/A	(England) Chelsea, (Germany) Hertha BSC, (Italy) Milan	
1999–2000	Beşiktaş	Second qualifying round	1–1 (a)	(Israel) Hapoel Haifa	1–1 at BJK İnönü Stadium; 0–0 at Kiryat Eliezer Stadium
2000–01	Galatasaray	Quarter-finals	3–5	(Spain) Real Madrid	3–2 at Ali Sami Yen Stadium; 0–3 at Santiago Bernabéu
2000–01	Beşiktaş	4th in first group stage	N/A	(Italy) Milan, (England) Leeds United, (Spain) Barcelona	
2001–02	Galatasaray	4th in second group stage	N/A	(Spain) Barcelona, (England) Liverpool, (Italy) Roma	
2001–02	Fenerbahçe	4th in first group stage	N/A	(Spain) Barcelona, (Germany) Bayer Leverkusen, (France) Lyon	
2002–03	Galatasaray	4th in first group stage	N/A	(Spain) Barcelona, (Russia) Lokomotiv Moscow, (Belgium) Club Brugge	
2002–03	Fenerbahçe	Third qualifying round	0–3	(Netherlands) Feyenoord	0–1 at De Kuip; 0–2 at Şükrü Saracoğlu Stadium
2003–04	Galatasaray	3rd in group stage	N/A	(Italy) Juventus, (Spain) Real Sociedad, (Greece) Olympiacos	
2003–04	Beşiktaş	3rd in group stage	N/A	(England) Chelsea, (Czech Republic) Sparta Prague, (Italy) Lazio	
2004–05	Fenerbahçe	3rd in group stage	N/A	(France) Lyon, (England) Manchester United, (Czech Republic) Sparta Prague	
2004–05	Trabzonspor	Third qualifying round	2–3	(Ukraine) Dynamo Kyiv	2–1 at Valeriy Lobanovskyi Dynamo Stadium; 0–2 at Hüseyin Avni Aker Stadium
2005–06	Fenerbahçe	4th in group stage	N/A	(Italy) Milan, (Netherlands) PSV Eindhoven, (Germany) Schalke 04	
2005–06	Trabzonspor	Second qualifying round	2–3	(Cyprus) Anorthosis	1–3 at GSP Stadium; 1–0 at Hüseyin Avni Aker Stadium
2006–07	Galatasaray	4th in group stage	N/A	(England) Liverpool, (Netherlands) PSV Eindhoven, (France) Bordeaux	
2006–07	Fenerbahçe	Third qualifying round	3–5	(Ukraine) Dynamo Kyiv	1–3 at Valeriy Lobanovskyi Dynamo Stadium; 2–2 at Hüseyin Avni Aker Stadium
2007–08	Beşiktaş	4th in group stage	N/A	(Portugal) Porto, (England) Liverpool, (France) Marseille	
2007–08	Fenerbahçe	Quarter-finals	2–3	(England) Chelsea	2–1 at Şükrü Saracoğlu Stadium; 0–2 at Stamford Bridge
2008–09	Fenerbahçe	4th in group stage	N/A	(Portugal) Porto, (England) Arsenal, (Ukraine) Dynamo Kyiv	
2008–09	Galatasaray	Third qualifying round	2–3	(Romania) Steaua București	2–2 at Ali Sami Yen Stadium; 0–1 at Stadionul Steaua
2009–10	Beşiktaş	4th in group stage	N/A	(England) Manchester United, (Russia) CSKA Moscow, (Germany) VfL Wolfsburg	
2009–10	Sivasspor	Third qualifying round	3–6	(Belgium) Anderlecht	0–5 at Constant Vanden Stock Stadium; 3–1 at 4 Eylül
2010–11	Bursaspor	4th in group stage	N/A	(England) Manchester United, (Spain) Valencia, (Scotland) Rangers	
2010–11	Fenerbahçe	Third qualifying round	2–3	(Switzerland) Young Boys	2–2 at Stade de Suisse; 0–1 at Şükrü Saracoğlu Stadium
2011–12	Trabzonspor	3rd in group stage	N/A	(Italy) Internazionale, (Russia) CSKA Moscow, (France) Lille	
2012–13	Galatasaray	Quarter-finals	3–5	(Spain) Real Madrid	0–3 at Santiago Bernabéu; 3–2 at Türk Telekom Arena
2012–13	Fenerbahçe	Play-off round	2–3	(Russia) Spartak Moscow	1–2 at Luzhniki Stadium; 1–1 at Şükrü Saracoğlu Stadium
2013–14	Galatasaray	Round of 16	1–3	(England) Chelsea	1–1 at Türk Telekom Arena; 0–2 at Stamford Bridge
2013–14	Fenerbahçe	Play-off round	0–5	(England) Arsenal	0–3 at Şükrü Saracoğlu Stadium; 0–2 at Emirates Stadium
2014–15	Galatasaray	4th in group stage	N/A	(Germany) Borussia Dortmund, (England) Arsenal, (Belgium) Anderlecht	
2014–15	Beşiktaş	Play-off round	0–1	(England) Arsenal	0–0 at Atatürk Olympic Stadium; 0–1 at Emirates Stadium
2015–16	Galatasaray	3rd in group stage	N/A	(Spain) Atlético Madrid, (Portugal) Benfica, (Kazakhstan) Astana	
2015–16	Fenerbahçe	Third qualifying round	0–3	(Ukraine) Shakhtar Donetsk	0–0 at Şükrü Saracoğlu Stadium; 0–3 at Arena Lviv
2016–17	Beşiktaş	3rd in group stage	N/A	(Italy) Napoli, (Portugal) Benfica, (Ukraine) Dynamo Kyiv	
2016–17	Fenerbahçe	Third qualifying round	3–4	(France) Monaco	2–1 at Şükrü Saracoğlu Stadium; 1–3 at Stade Louis II
2017–18	Beşiktaş	Round of 16	1–8	(Germany) Bayern Munich	0–5 at Allianz Arena; 1–3 at Vodafone Park
2017–18	İstanbul Başakşehir	Play-off round	3–4	(Spain) Sevilla	1–2 at Başakşehir Fatih Terim Stadium; 2–2 at Ramón Sánchez Pizjuán
2018–19	Galatasaray	3rd in group stage	N/A	(Portugal) Porto, (Germany) Schalke 04, (Russia) Lokomotiv Moscow	
2018–19	Fenerbahçe	Third qualifying round	1–2	(Portugal) Benfica	0–1 at Estádio da Luz; 1–1 at Şükrü Saracoğlu Stadium
2019–20	Galatasaray	4th in group stage	N/A	(France) Paris Saint-Germain, (Spain) Real Madrid, (Belgium) Club Brugge	
2019–20	İstanbul Başakşehir	Third qualifying round	0–3	(Greece) Olympiacos	0–1 at Başakşehir Fatih Terim Stadium; 0–2 at Karaiskakis Stadium
2020–21	İstanbul Başakşehir	4th in group stage	N/A	(France) Paris Saint-Germain, (Germany) RB Leipzig, (England) Manchester United	
2020–21	Beşiktaş	Second qualifying round	1–3	(Greece) PAOK	1–3 at Toumba Stadium
2021–22	Beşiktaş	4th in group stage	N/A	(Netherlands) Ajax, (Portugal) Sporting CP, (Germany) Borussia Dortmund	
2021–22	Galatasaray	Second qualifying round	2–7	(Netherlands) PSV Eindhoven	1–5 at Philips Stadion; 1–2 at Başakşehir Fatih Terim Stadium
2022–23	Trabzonspor	Play-off round	1–2	(Denmark) Copenhagen	1–2 at Parken Stadium^{3} 0–0 at Şenol Güneş Sports Complex
2022–23	Fenerbahçe	Second qualifying round	1–2 (a.e.t.)	(Ukraine) Dynamo Kyiv	0–0 at Stadion Miejski im. Władysława Króla^{3} 1–2 at Şükrü Saracoğlu Stadium
2023–24	Galatasaray	3rd in group stage	N/A	(Germany) Bayern Munich, (Denmark) Copenhagen, (England) Manchester United	
2024–25	Galatasaray	Play-off round	2–4	(Switzerland) Young Boys	2–3 at Wankdorf Stadium; 0–1 at Rams Park
2024–25	Fenerbahçe	Third qualifying round	2–3 (a.e.t.)	(France) Lille	1–2 at Stade du Hainaut; 1–1 at Şükrü Saracoğlu Stadium
2025–26	Galatasaray	Round of 16	1–4	(England) Liverpool	1–0 at Rams Park; 0–4 at Anfield
2025–26	Fenerbahçe	Play-off round	0–1	(Portugal) Benfica	0–0 at Şükrü Saracoğlu Stadium; 0–1 at Estádio da Luz

^{1} Nice won 5–1 in a play-off to qualify for the quarter-finals.

^{2} Zürich advanced to the second round over Galatasaray by winning a coin toss, after their play-off match ended 2–2.

^{3}Due to the Russian invasion of Ukraine, Ukrainian teams were required to play their home matches at neutral venues until further notice.

== Appearances in UEFA Cup/UEFA Europa League ==
Note: Clubs in bold won the corresponding competition that season.

Season	Club	Progress	Score	Opponents	Venue(s)
UEFA Cup
1971–72	Fenerbahçe	First round	2–4	(Hungary) Ferencváros	1–1 at Mithatpaşa; 1–3 at Népstadion
1972–73	Fenerbahçe	First round	1–3	(Poland) Ruch Chorzów	0–3 at Stadion Miejski; 1–0 at Mithatpaşa
1972–73	Eskişehirspor	First round	1–5	(Italy) Fiorentina	1–2 at Ali Sami Yen Stadium; 0–3 at Stadio Artemio Franchi
1973–74	Eskişehirspor	First round	0–2	(West Germany) 1. FC Köln	0–0 at Eskişehir Atatürk Stadium; 0–2 at Müngersdorfer Stadion
1973–74	Fenerbahçe	Second round	2–4	(France) Nice	0–4 at Stade du Ray; 2–0 at Mithatpaşa
1974–75	Boluspor	First round	0–4	(Romania) Dinamo București	0–1 at Bolu Atatürk Stadium; 0–3 at Stadionul Dinamo
1974–75	Beşiktaş	First round	2–3	(Romania) Steagul Roșu Brașov	2–0 at İnönü Stadium; 0–3 at Stadionul Tineretului
1975–76	Eskişehirspor	First round	1–7	(Bulgaria) Levski-Spartak Sofia	0–3 at Vasil Levski National Stadium; 1–4 at Eskişehir Atatürk Stadium
1975–76	Galatasaray	Second round	2–7	(Soviet Union) Torpedo Moscow	2–4 at Ali Sami Yen Stadium; 0–3 at Central Lenin Stadium
1976–77	Adanaspor	First round	2–5	Austria Salzburg	0–5 at Stadion Lehen; 2–0 at Adana 5 Ocak Stadium
1976–77	Fenerbahçe	First round	2–5	(Hungary) Videoton	2–1 at İnönü Stadium; 0–4 at Sóstói Stadion
1977–78	Altay	First round	5–6	(East Germany) Carl Zeiss Jena	1–5 at Ernst-Abbe-Sportfeld; 4–1 at İzmir Alsancak Stadium
1977–78	Fenerbahçe	First round	0–6	(England) Aston Villa	0–4 at Villa Park; 0–2 at İnönü Stadium
1978–79	Adanaspor	First round	2–8	(Hungary) Budapest Honvéd	0–6 at Bozsik József Stadion; 2–2 at Adana 5 Ocak Stadium
1978–79	Galatasaray	First round	2–6	(England) West Bromwich Albion	1–3 at İzmir Alsancak Stadium; 1–3 at The Hawthorns
1979–80	Galatasaray	First round	1–3	(Socialist Federal Republic of Yugoslavia) Red Star Belgrade	0–0 at İnönü Stadium; 1–3 at Red Star Stadium
1979–80	Orduspor	First round	2–6	(Czechoslovakia) Baník Ostrava	2–0 at 19 Eylül Stadium; 0–6 at Bazaly
1980–81	Fenerbahçe	First round	1–3	(Bulgaria) Beroe Stara Zagora	0–1 at Şükrü Saracoğlu Stadium; 1–2 at Beroe Stadium
1981–82	Adanaspor	First round	2–7	(Italy) Internazionale	1–3 at 5 Ocak Stadium; 1–4 at San Siro
1982–83	Trabzonspor	First round	0–6	(West Germany) 1. FC Kaiserslautern	0–3 at Betzenbergstadion; 0–3 at Ankara
1983–84	Trabzonspor	First round	1–2	(Italy) Internazionale	1–0 at Hüseyin Avni Aker Stadium; 0–2 at Stadio Dino Manuzzi
1984–85	Fenerbahçe	First round	0–3	(Italy) Fiorentina	0–1 at Şükrü Saracoğlu Stadium; 0–2 at Stadio Comunale
1985–86	Beşiktaş	First round	1–5	(Spain) Athletic Bilbao	1–4 at San Mamés; 0–1 at BJK İnönü Stadyumu
1986–87	Galatasaray	First round	2–3	(Romania) Universitatea Craiova	0–2 at Stadionul Central; 2–1 at Ali Sami Yen Stadium
1987–88	Beşiktaş	First round	1–3	(Italy) Internazionale	0–0 at BJK İnönü Stadyumu; 1–3 at Stadio Giuseppe Meazza
1988–89	Beşiktaş	First round	1–2	(Socialist Federal Republic of Yugoslavia) Dinamo Zagreb	1–0 at BJK İnönü Stadyumu; 0–2 at Stadion Maksimir
1989–90	Galatasaray	First round	1–3	(Socialist Federal Republic of Yugoslavia) Red Star Belgrade	1–1 at Ali Sami Yen Stadium; 0–2 at Marakana
1990–91	Fenerbahçe	Second round	1–5	(Italy) Atalanta	0–1 at Fenerbahçe Stadium; 1–4 at Stadio Comunale
1991–92	Trabzonspor	Third round	1–2	(Denmark) B 1903	0–1 at Gentofte Stadion; 1–1 at Hüseyin Avni Aker Stadium
1992–93	Fenerbahçe	Second round	2–7	(Czechoslovakia) Sigma Olomouc	1–0 at Fenerbahçe Stadium; 1–7 at Olomouc
1992–93	Galatasaray	Third round	4–5	(Italy) Roma	1–3 at Stadio Olimpico; 2–3 at Ali Sami Yen Stadium
1993–94	Kocaelispor	First round	0–2	(Portugal) Sporting CP	0–0 at İzmit İsmetpaşa Stadium; 0–2 at Lisbon
1993–94	Trabzonspor	Second round	1–1 (a)	(Italy) Cagliari	1–1 at Ali Sami Yen Stadium; 0–0 at Stadio Amsicora
1994–95	Fenerbahçe	First round	1–9	(France) Cannes	0–4 at Stade Pierre de Coubertin; 1–5 at Şükrü Saracoğlu Stadium
1994–95	Trabzonspor	Third round	2–4	(Italy) Lazio	1–2 at Ali Sami Yen Stadium; 1–2 at Stadio Olimpico
1995–96	Fenerbahçe	First round	1–4	(Spain) Real Betis	1–2 at Şükrü Saracoğlu Stadium; 0–2 at Benito Villamarín
1995–96	Galatasaray	First round	2–4	(Czech Republic) Sparta Prague	1–3 at Letná Stadium; 1–1 at Ali Sami Yen Stadium
1996–97	Beşiktaş	Third round	3–5	(Spain) Valencia	1–3 at Mestalla; 2–2 at Fİ-YAPI Inönü Stadyumu
1996–97	Trabzonspor	Second round	3–4	(Germany) **Schalke 04**	0–1 at Parkstadion; 3–3 at Hüseyin Avni Aker Stadium
1997–98	Fenerbahçe	First round	1–2	(Romania) Steaua București	0–0 at Stadionul Steaua; 1–2 at Şükrü Saracoğlu Stadium
1997–98	Trabzonspor	First round	5–6	(Germany) VfL Bochum	2–1 at Hüseyin Avni Aker Stadium; 3–5 at Ruhrstadion
1998–99	Fenerbahçe	First round	2–3	(Italy) **Parma**	1–0 at Şükrü Saracoğlu Stadium; 1–3 at Stadio Ennio Tardini
1998–99	İstanbulspor	First round	4–4 (a)	(Romania) Argeș Pitești	0–2 at Stadionul Nicolae Dobrin; 4–2 at BJK İnönü Stadium
1998–99	Trabzonspor	First round	2–7	(Poland) Wisła Kraków	1–5 at Stadion Miejski im. Henryka Reymana; 1–2 at Hüseyin Avni Aker Stadium
1999–2000	Ankaragücü	First round	1–3	(Spain) Atlético Madrid	0–3 at Vicente Calderón; 1–0 at Ankara 19 Mayıs Stadium
1999–2000	Fenerbahçe	First round	0–2	(Hungary) MTK Hungária	0–0 at Hidegkuti Nándor Stadion; 0–2 at Şükrü Saracoğlu Stadium
1999–2000	**Galatasaray**	Final	0–0 (4–1 p)	(England) Arsenal	Parken Stadium
2000–01	Antalyaspor	First round	2–6	(Germany) Werder Bremen	2–0 at Antalya Atatürk Stadium; 0–6 at Weserstadion
2000–01	Gaziantepspor	First round	3–4	(Spain) Alavés	0–0 at Mendizorrotza; 3–4 at Gaziantep Kamil Ocak Stadium
2001–02	Gaziantepspor	First round	1–2	(Israel) Hapoel Tel Aviv	0–1 at Bloomfield Stadium; 1–1 at Gaziantep Kamil Ocak Stadium
2001–02	Gençlerbirliği	First round	1–2	(Sweden) Halmstad	1–1 at Ankara 19 Mayıs Stadium; 0–1 at Örjans Vall
2002–03	Ankaragücü	First round	1–5	(Spain) Alavés	1–2 at Ankara 19 Mayıs Stadium; 0–3 at Mendizorrotza
2002–03	Beşiktaş	Quarter-finals	1–3	(Italy) Lazio	0–1 at Stadio Olimpico; 1–2 at İnönü Stadium
2002–03	Denizlispor	Fourth round	3–8	(Portugal) **Porto**	1–6 at Estádio das Antas; 2–2 at Denizli Atatürk Stadium
2002–03	Fenerbahçe	Second round	2–5	(Greece) Panathinaikos	1–1 at Şükrü Saracoğlu Stadium; 1–4 at Leoforos Alexandras Stadium
2002–03	Kocaelispor	First round	0–5	(Hungary) Ferencváros	0–4 at Stadion Albert Flórián; 0–1 at İzmit İsmetpaşa Stadium
2003–04	Beşiktaş	Third round	2–5	(Spain) **Valencia**	2–3 at Mestalla; 0–2 at BJK İnönü Stadium
2003–04	Galatasaray	Third round	2–5	(Spain) Villarreal	2–2 at Atatürk Olympic Stadium; 0–3 at Estadio de la Cerámica
2003–04	Gaziantepspor	Third round	1–2	(Italy) Roma	1–0 at Gaziantep Kamil Ocak Stadium; 0–2 at Stadio Olimpico
2003–04	Gençlerbirliği	Fourth round	1–2 (a.e.t.)	(Spain) Valencia	1–0 at Ankara 19 Mayıs Stadium; 0–2 at Mestalla
2003–04	Malatyaspor	First round	2–3 (a.e.t.)	(Switzerland) Basel	0–2 at Malatya İnönü Stadium; 2–1 at St. Jakob-Park
2003–04	Trabzonspor	First round	2–3	(Spain) Villarreal	0–0 at Estadio de la Cerámica; 2–3 at Hüseyin Avni Aker Stadium
2004–05	Beşiktaş	4th in group stage	N/A	(Spain) Athletic Bilbao, (Romania) Steaua București, (Italy) Parma, (Belgium) Standard Liège	
2004–05	Fenerbahçe	Round of 32	1–3	(Spain) Zaragoza	0–1 at Şükrü Saracoğlu Stadium; 1–2 at La Romareda
2004–05	Gençlerbirliği	First round	1–2	(Greece) Egaleo	0–1 at Georgios Kamaras Stadium; 1–1 at Ankara 19 Mayıs Stadium
2004–05	Trabzonspor	First round	3–4	(Spain) Athletic Bilbao	3–2 at Hüseyin Avni Aker Stadium; 0–2 at San Mamés
2005–06	Beşiktaş	4th in group stage	N/A	(Spain) **Sevilla**, (Russia) Zenit Saint Petersburg, (England) Bolton Wanderers, (Portugal) Vitória de Guimarães	
2005–06	Galatasaray	First round	1–2	(Norway) Tromsø	0–1 at Alfheim Stadion; 1–1 at Ali Sami Yen Stadium
2006–07	Beşiktaş	4th in group stage	N/A	(England) Tottenham Hotspur, (Romania) Dinamo București, (Germany) Bayer Leverkusen, (Belgium) Club Brugge	
2006–07	Fenerbahçe	Round of 32	5–5 (a)	(Netherlands) AZ	3–3 at Şükrü Saracoğlu Stadium; 2–2 at DSB Stadion
2006–07	Kayserispor	First round	3–4	(Netherlands) AZ	2–3 at DSB Stadion; 1–1 at Kayseri Atatürk Stadium
2006–07	Trabzonspor^{1}	First round	2–2 (a)	(Spain) Osasuna	2–2 at Hüseyin Avni Aker Stadium; 0–0 at El Sadar
2007–08	Galatasaray	Round of 32	1–5	(Germany) Bayer Leverkusen	0–0 at Ali Sami Yen Stadium; 1–5 at BayArena
2007–08	Kayseri Erciyesspor	First round	0–9	(Spain) Atlético Madrid	0–4 at Vicente Calderón; 0–5 at Kayseri Atatürk Stadium
2008–09	Beşiktaş	First round	2–4	(Ukraine) Metalist Kharkiv	1–0 at BJK İnönü Stadium; 1–4 at Metalist Stadium
2008–09	Galatasaray	Round of 16	3–4	(Germany) Hamburger SV	1–1 at HSH Nordbank Arena; 2–3 at Ali Sami Yen Stadium
2008–09	Kayserispor	First round	1–2	(France) Paris Saint-Germain	1–2 at Kayseri Atatürk Stadium; 0–0 at Parc de Princes
UEFA Europa League
2009–10	Fenerbahçe	Round of 32	2–3	(France) Lille	1–2 at Stadium Nord Lille Métropole; 1–1 at Şükrü Saracoğlu Stadium
2009–10	Galatasaray	Round of 32	2–3	(Spain) **Atlético Madrid**	1–1 at Vicente Calderón; 1–2 at Ali Sami Yen Stadium
2009–10	Sivasspor	Play-off round	0–5	(Ukraine) Shakhtar Donetsk	0–3 at Sivas 4 Eylül Stadium; 0–2 at RSC Olimpiyskiy
2009–10	Trabzonspor	Play-off round	2–3	(France) Toulouse	1–3 at Hüseyin Avni Aker Stadium; 1–0 at Stadium Municipal
2010–11	Beşiktaş	Round of 32	1–8	(Ukraine) Dynamo Kyiv	1–4 at BJK İnönü Stadium; 0–4 at Lobanovsky Dynamo Stadium
2010–11	Fenerbahçe	Play-off round	1–2 (a.e.t.)	(Greece) PAOK	0–1 at Toumba Stadium; 1–1 at Şükrü Saracoğlu Stadium
2010–11	Galatasaray	Play-off round	3–3 (a)	(Ukraine) Karpaty Lviv	2–2 at Ali Sami Yen Stadium; 1–1 at Ukraina Stadium
2010–11	Trabzonspor	Play-off round	1–3	(England) Liverpool	0–1 at Anfield; 1–2 at Hüseyin Avni Aker Stadium
2011–12	Beşiktaş	Round of 16	1–6	(Spain) **Atlético Madrid**	1–3 at Vicente Calderón; 0–3 at BJK İnönü Stadium
2011–12	Bursaspor	Play-off round	3–4	(Belgium) Anderlecht	1–2 at Bursa Atatürk Stadium; 2–2 at Constant Vanden Stock Stadium
2011–12	Gaziantepspor	Third qualifying round	0–1	(Poland) Legia Warsaw	0–1 at Gaziantep Kamil Ocak Stadium; 0–0 at Pepsi Arena
2011–12	Trabzonspor^{Note TUR}	Round of 32	2–6	(Netherlands) PSV Eindhoven	1–2 at Hüseyin Avni Aker Stadium; 1–4 at Philips Stadion
2012–13	Bursaspor	Play-off round	4–5 (a.e.t.)	(Netherlands) Twente	3–1 at Bursa Atatürk Stadium; 1–4 at De Grolsch Veste
2012–13	Eskişehirspor	Third qualifying round	1–4	(France) Marseille	1–1 at Eskişehir Atatürk Stadium; 0–3 at Stade Parsemain
2012–13	Fenerbahçe	Semi-finals	2–3	(Portugal) Benfica	1–0 at Şükrü Saracoğlu Stadium; 1–3 at Estádio da Luz
2012–13	Trabzonspor	Play-off round	0–0 (2–4 p)	(Hungary) Videoton	0–0 at Hüseyin Avni Aker Stadium; 0–0 at Sóstói Stadion
2013–14	Bursaspor	Third qualifying round	2–5	(Serbia) Vojvodina	2–2 at Karađorđe Stadium; 0–3 at Bursa Atatürk Stadium
2013–14	Trabzonspor	Round of 32	0–4	(Italy) Juventus	0–2 at Juventus Stadium; 0–2 at Hüseyin Avni Aker Stadium
2014–15	Beşiktaş	Round of 16	2–5	(Belgium) Club Brugge	1–2 at Jan Breydel Stadium; 1–3 at Atatürk Olympic Stadium
2014–15	Bursaspor	Second qualifying round	0–0 (1–4 p)	(Georgia (country)) Chikhura Sachkhere	0–0 at Bursa Atatürk Stadium; 0–0 at Mikheil Meskhi Stadium
2014–15	Karabükspor	Play-off round	1–1 (3–4 p)	(France) Saint-Étienne	1–0 at Dr. Necmettin Şeyhoğlu Stadium; 0–1 at Stade Geoffroy-Guichard
2014–15	Trabzonspor	Round of 32	0–5	(Italy) Napoli	0–4 at Hüseyin Avni Aker Stadium; 0–1 at Stadio San Paolo
2015–16	Beşiktaş	3rd in group stage	N/A	(Italy) Lazio, (France) Saint-Étienne, (Albania) Skënderbeu	
2015–16	Fenerbahçe	Round of 16	2–4	(Portugal) Braga	1–0 at Şükrü Saracoğlu Stadium; 1–4 at Estádio Municipal de Braga
2015–16	Galatasaray	Round of 32	2–4	(Italy) Lazio	1–1 at Nef Stadium; 1–3 at Stadio Olimpico
2015–16	İstanbul Başakşehir	Third qualifying round	1–4	(Netherlands) AZ	0–2 at AFAS Stadion; 1–2 at Başakşehir Fatih Terim Stadium
2015–16	Trabzonspor	Third qualifying round	1–2 (a.e.t.)	(North Macedonia) Rabotnički	0–1 at Philip II National Arena; 1–1 at Hüseyin Avni Aker Stadium
2016–17	Beşiktaş	Quarter-finals	3–3 (6–7 p)	(France) Lyon	1–2 at Parc Olympique Lyonnais; 2–1 at Vodafone Park
2016–17	Fenerbahçe	Round of 32	1–2	(Russia) Krasnodar	0–1 at Krasnodar Stadium; 1–1 at Şükrü Saracoğlu Stadium
2016–17	İstanbul Başakşehir	Play-off round	1–4	(Ukraine) Shakhtar Donetsk	1–2 at Başakşehir Fatih Terim Stadium; 0–2 at Arena Lviv
2016–17	Konyaspor	4th in group stage	N/A	(Ukraine) Shakhtar Donetsk, (Belgium) Gent, (Portugal) Braga	
2016–17	Osmanlıspor	Round of 16	0–3	(Greece) Olympiacos	0–0 at Karaiskakis Stadium; 0–3 at Osmanlı Stadium
2017–18	Fenerbahçe	Play-off round	1–4	(North Macedonia) Vardar	0–2 at Philip II National Arena; 1–2 at Şükrü Saracoğlu Stadium
2017–18	Galatasaray	Second qualifying round	1–3	(Sweden) Östersund	1–1 at Nef Stadium; 0–2 at Jämtkraft Arena
2017–18	İstanbul Başakşehir	3rd in group stage	N/A	(Portugal) Braga, (Bulgaria) Ludogorets Razgrad, (Germany) 1899 Hoffenheim	
2017–18	Konyaspor	3rd in group stage	N/A	(Austria) Red Bull Salzburg, (France) Marseille, (Portugal) Vitória de Guimarães	
2018–19	Akhisarspor	4th in group stage	N/A	(Spain) Sevilla, (Russia) Krasnodar, (Belgium) Standard Liège	
2018–19	Beşiktaş	3rd in group stage	N/A	(Belgium) Genk, (Sweden) Malmö FF, (Norway) Sarpsborg 08	
2018–19	Fenerbahçe	Round of 32	2–3	(Russia) Zenit Saint Petersburg	1–0 at Şükrü Saracoğlu Stadium; 1–3 at Krestovsky Stadium
2018–19	Galatasaray	Round of 32	1–2	(Portugal) Benfica	1–2 at Nef Stadium; 0–0 at Estádio da Luz
2018–19	İstanbul Başakşehir	Third qualifying round	0–1 (a.e.t.)	(England) Burnley	0–0 at Başakşehir Fatih Terim Stadium; 0–1 at Turf Moor
2019–20	Beşiktaş	4th in group stage	N/A	(Portugal) Braga, (England) Wolverhampton Wanderers, (Slovakia) Slovan Bratislava	
2019–20	İstanbul Başakşehir	Round of 16	1–3	(Denmark) Copenhagen	1–0 at Başakşehir Fatih Terim Stadium; 0–3 at Parken Stadium
2019–20	Trabzonspor	4th in group stage	N/A	(Switzerland) Basel, (Spain) Getafe, (Russia) Krasnodar	
2019–20	Yeni Malatyaspor	Third qualifying round	2–3	(Serbia) Partizan	1–3 at Partizan Stadium; 1–0 at New Malatya Stadium
2020–21	Alanyaspor	Third qualifying round	0–1	(Norway) Rosenborg	0–1 at Lerkendal Stadion
2020–21	Beşiktaş	Third qualifying round	1–1 (2–4 p)	(Portugal) Rio Ave	1–1 at Vodafone Park
2020–21	Galatasaray	Play-off round	1–2	(Scotland) Rangers	1–2 at Ibrox Stadium
2020–21	Sivasspor	3rd in group stage	N/A	(Spain) **Villarreal**, (Israel) Maccabi Tel Aviv, (Azerbaijan) Qarabağ	
2021–22	Fenerbahçe	3rd in group stage	N/A	(Germany) Eintracht Frankfurt, (Greece) Olympiacos, (Belgium) Antwerp	
2021–22	Galatasaray	Round of 16	1–2	(Spain) Barcelona	0–0 at Camp Nou; 1–2 at Nef Stadium
2022–23	Fenerbahçe	Round of 16	1–2	(Spain) **Sevilla**	0–2 at Ramón Sánchez Pizjuán; 1–0 at Şükrü Saracoğlu Stadium
2022–23	Sivasspor	Play-off round	1–5	(Sweden) Malmö FF	1–3 at Eleda Stadion; 0–2 at New Sivas 4 Eylül Stadium
2022–23	Trabzonspor	3rd in group stage	N/A	(Hungary) Ferencváros, (France) Monaco, (Serbia) Red Star Belgrade	
2023–24	Galatasaray	Knockout round play-offs	4–6	(Czech Republic) Sparta Prague	3–2 at Rams Park; 1–4 at Stadion Letná
2024–25	Beşiktaş	League phase	N/A	28th place	
2024–25	Fenerbahçe	Round of 16	3–3 (2–3 p)	(Scotland) Rangers	1–3 at Ibrox Stadium; 2–0 at Şükrü Saracoğlu Stadium
2024–25	Galatasaray	Knockout phase play-offs	3–6	(Netherlands) AZ	1–4 at AFAS Stadion; 2–2 at Rams Park
2024–25	Trabzonspor	Third qualifying round	0–3	(Austria) Rapid Wien	0–1 at Şenol Güneş Sports Complex; 0–2 at Allianz Stadion
2025–26	Fenerbahçe	Knockout phase play-offs	2–4	(England) Nottingham Forest	0–3 at Şükrü Saracoğlu Stadium; 2–1 at City Ground
2025–26	Samsunspor	Play-off round	1–2	(Greece) Panathinaikos	1–2 at Olympic Stadium; 0–0 at Samsun 19 Mayıs Stadium
2025–26	Beşiktaş	Second qualifying round	2–6	(Ukraine) Shakhtar Donetsk	2–4 at Beşiktaş Stadium; 0–2 at Henryk Reyman Municipal Stadium

^{1}UEFA ordered Trabzonspor's home leg on 14 September to be played behind closed doors after objects were thrown at visiting fans and the fourth official, and a smoke bomb ignited in the stands, during their second qualifying round home leg against Cypriots APOEL. Trabzonspor appealed, and UEFA rejected the appeal on 13 September. Trabzonspor's penalty included a second closed-doors game, a penalty which had been deferred for two years and would be removed if no further incidents occur.

- Turkey (TUR): Fenerbahçe, the 2010–11 Süper Lig champions, was banned by the Turkish Football Federation on 24 August 2011 from participating in the 2011–12 UEFA Champions League due to the ongoing investigation into match-fixing. UEFA decided to replace them in the 2011–12 UEFA Champions League with Trabzonspor, the league runners-up, who had lost in the Champions League third qualifying round and were participating in the Europa League play-off round at that time. They finished third in their group and thus advanced to the 2011–12 UEFA Europa League knockout phase.
Turkey (TUR): Galatasaray would have qualified for the Europa League group stage as the winners of the 2015–16 Turkish Cup, but were excluded from participating in the 2016–17 European competitions by the UEFA Club Financial Control Body. As a result, the third-placed team of the 2015–16 Süper Lig, Konyaspor, entered the group stage instead of the third qualifying round, the fourth-placed team İstanbul Başakşehir entered the third qualifying round instead of the second qualifying round, and the second qualifying round berth was given to the fifth-placed team Osmanlıspor. Galatasaray appealed the decision to the Court of Arbitration for Sport, but it was rejected.

== Appearances in UEFA Conference League ==
Note: Clubs in bold won the corresponding competition that season.

Season	Club	Progress	Score	Opponents	Venue(s)
2021–22	Fenerbahçe	Knockout round play-offs	4–6	(Czech Republic) Slavia Prague	2–3 at Şükrü Saracoğlu Stadium; 2–3 at Fortuna Arena
2021–22	Sivasspor	Play-off round	1–7	(Denmark) Copenhagen	1–2 at New Sivas 4 Eylül Stadium; 0–5 at Parken Stadium
2021–22	Trabzonspor	Play-off round	1–5	(Italy) **Roma**	1–2 at Şenol Güneş Sports Complex; 0–3 at Stadio Olimpico
2022–23	İstanbul Başakşehir	Round of 16	2–5	(Belgium) Gent	1–1 at Ghelamco Arena; 1–4 at Başakşehir Fatih Terim
2022–23	Konyaspor	Third qualifying round	3–5	(Liechtenstein) Vaduz	1–1 at Rheinpark Stadion; 2–4 at Konya Metropolitan Municipality Stadium
2022–23	Sivasspor	Round of 16	1–5	(Italy) Fiorentina	0–1 at Stadio Artemio Franchi; 1–4 at New Sivas 4 Eylül Stadium
2022–23	Trabzonspor	Play-off round	1–2	(Switzerland) Basel	1–0 at Şenol Güneş Sports Complex; 0–2 at St. Jakob-Park
2023–24	Adana Demirspor	Play-off round	2–2 (4–5 p)	(Belgium) Genk	1–2 at Cegeka Arena; 1–0 at New Adana Stadium
2023–24	Beşiktaş	3rd in group stage	N/A	(Belgium) Club Brugge, (Norway) Bodø/Glimt, (Switzerland) Lugano	
2023–24	Fenerbahçe	Quarter-finals	3–3 (2–3 p)	(Greece) **Olympiacos**	2–3 at Karaiskakis Stadium; 1–0 at Şükrü Saracoğlu Stadium
2024–25	İstanbul Başakşehir	League phase	N/A	26th place	
2024–25	Trabzonspor	Play-off round	1–1 (4–5 p)	(Switzerland) St. Gallen	0–0 at Kybunpark; 1–1 at Şenol Güneş Sports Complex
2025–26	İstanbul Başakşehir	Play-off round	2–5	(Romania) Universitatea Craiova	1–2 at Başakşehir Fatih Terim Stadium; 1–3 at Ion Oblemenco Stadium
2025–26	Beşiktaş	Play-off round	1–2	(Switzerland) Lausanne-Sport	1–1 at Stade de la Tuilière; 0–1 at Beşiktaş Stadium
2025–26	Samsunspor	Round of 16	2–3	(Spain) Rayo Vallecano	1–3 at Samsun 19 Mayıs Stadium; 1–0 at Campo de Fútbol de Vallecas

== Appearances in non-UEFA competitions ==
As of 11 May 1994

Club	Pld	W	D	L	GF	GA	GD	W%	Pts
Fenerbahçe	29	10	6	13	34	45	−11	34.48	36
Göztepe	24	8	2	14	28	43	−15	33.33	26
Eskişehirspor	18	7	2	9	30	34	−4	38.89	23
Samsunspor	8	5	1	2	21	15	+6	62.50	16
Beşiktaş	23	3	7	13	17	52	−35	13.04	16
Sarıyer	6	3	2	1	9	4	+5	50.00	11
Altay	18	2	5	11	15	46	−31	11.11	11
Galatasaray	12	2	3	7	9	22	−13	16.67	9
Ankaragücü	4	2	1	1	3	1	+2	50.00	7
Türk Telekomspor	4	1	1	2	8	8	+0	25.00	4
Karşıyaka	2	1	0	1	5	6	−1	50.00	3
Adanaspor	4	0	2	2	3	11	−8	0.00	2
Gençlerbirliği	6	0	1	5	3	10	−7	0.00	1
Boluspor	4	0	1	3	3	12	−9	0.00	1
Total	162	44	34	84	188	309	−121	27.16	166

Legend: GF = Goals For. GA = Goals Against. GD = Goal Difference. Pts = Points

Season	Club	Progress	Score	Opponents	Venue(s)
Balkans Cup
1960–61	Fenerbahçe	4th in group stage	N/A	(Romania) Steagul Roșu Brașov, (Bulgaria) Levski Sofia, (Albania) Partizani, (Greece) AEK Athens	
1961–63	Galatasaray	withdrew^{1}			
1961–63	Fenerbahçe	4th in group stage	N/A	(Bulgaria) Levski Sofia, (Albania) Dinamo Tirana, (Romania) Dinamo București	
1963–64	Fenerbahçe	withdrew^{2}			
1963–64	Beşiktaş	4th in group stage	N/A	(Romania) Rapid București, (Bulgaria) Levski Sofia, (Albania) Dinamo Tirana	
1964–66	Beşiktaş	4th in group stage	N/A	(Romania) Rapid București, (Bulgaria) Cherno More Varna, (Albania) 17 Nëntori Tirana	
1966–67	Fenerbahçe	Final	5–3	(Greece) AEK Athens	1–2 at AEK Stadium; 1–0 at Şükrü Saracoğlu Stadium; 3–1 at Mithat Paşa Stadium
1967–68	Gençlerbirliği	4th in group stage	N/A	(Bulgaria) Beroe Stara Zagora, (Albania) Vllaznia Shkodër, (Romania) Farul Constanța	
1967–68	Fenerbahçe	4th in group stage	N/A	(Bulgaria) Spartak Sofia, (Socialist Federal Republic of Yugoslavia) Olimpija Ljubljana, (Greece) AEK Athens	
1969	Türk Telekomspor	2nd in group stage	N/A	(Bulgaria) Beroe Stara Zagora, (Greece) Pierikos	
1970	Eskişehirspor	2nd in group stage	N/A	(Bulgaria) Beroe Stara Zagora, (Greece) Egaleo	
1971	Altay	3rd in group stage	N/A	(Greece) Panionios, (Romania) Steagul Roșu Brașov	
1972	Göztepe	2nd in group stage	N/A	(Bulgaria) Trakia Plovdiv, (Romania) Steagul Roșu Brașov	
1973	Beşiktaş	2nd in group stage	N/A	(Bulgaria) Lokomotiv Sofia, (Greece) Aris	
1974	Boluspor	3rd in group stage	N/A	(Bulgaria) Akademik Sofia, (Romania) SC Bacău	
1975	Eskişehirspor	Final	1–3	(Socialist Federal Republic of Yugoslavia) Radnički Niš	0–1 at Čair Stadium; 1–2 at Eskişehir Atatürk Stadium
1976	Adanaspor	3rd in group stage	N/A	(Romania) Sportul Studențesc, (Bulgaria) Akademik Sofia	
1977	Altay	3rd in group stage	N/A	(Bulgaria) Slavia Sofia, (Romania) Politehnica Timișoara	
1977–78	Galatasaray	withdrew^{3}			
1979–80	Galatasaray	withdrew^{3}			
1980–81	Zonguldakspor	withdrew^{4}			
1981–83	Galatasaray	3rd in group stage	N/A	(Bulgaria) Beroe Stara Zagora, (Romania) Steaua București	
1983–84	Galatasaray	3rd in group stage	N/A	(Bulgaria) Beroe Stara Zagora, (Romania) Argeș Pitești	
1984–85	Galatasaray	Quarter-finals	2–5	(Greece) Iraklis	1–5 at Kaftanzoglio Stadium; 1–0 at Ali Sami Yen Stadium
1984–85	Ankaragücü	Semi-finals	1–1 (2–4 p)	(Greece) Iraklis	0–1 at Kaftanzoglio Stadium; 1–0 (2–4 p) at Ankara 19 Mayıs Stadium
1986	Trabzonspor	withdrew^{5}			
1987–88	Eskişehirspor	2nd in group stage	N/A	(Romania) Corvinul Hunedoara, (Albania) Dinamo Tirana	
1987–88	Samsunspor	2nd in group stage	N/A	(Bulgaria) Sliven, (Greece) Iraklis	
1988–89	Malatyaspor	withdrew^{6}			
1990–91	Galatasaray	Semi-finals	1–1 (a)	(Socialist Federal Republic of Yugoslavia) Budućnost Titograd	0–0 at Podgorica City Stadium; 1–1 at Ali Sami Yen Stadium
1991–92	Sarıyer	Final	1–0	(Romania) Oțelul Galați	0–0 at Stadionul Oțelul; 1–0 at Yusuf Ziya Öniş Stadium
1992–93	Karşıyaka	Quarter-finals	5–6	(Bulgaria) Etar	4–1 at 1–5 at
1993–94	Samsunspor	Final	5–0	(Greece) PAS Giannina	3–0 at Zosimades Stadium; 2–0 at Samsun 19 Mayıs Stadium
International Soccer League
1961	Beşiktaş	8th in group stage	N/A	(England) Everton, (Brazil) Bangu, (United States) New York Americans, (West Germany) Karlsruher SC, (Scotland) Kilmarnock, (Canada) Montreal Concordia, (Romania) Dinamo București	
Inter-Cities Fairs Cup
1962–63	Altay	First round	3–13	(Italy) Roma	2–3 at İzmir; 1–10 at Rome
1964–65	Göztepe	First round	1–3	(Romania) Petrolul Ploiești	0–1 at İzmir Alsancak Stadium; 1–2 at Stadionul Petrolul
1965–66	Göztepe	Second round	3–10	(West Germany) 1860 Munich	2–1 at 1–9 at
1966–67	Göztepe	First round	2–5	(Italy) Bologna	1–2 at İzmir Alsancak Stadium; 1–3 at Stadio Renato Dall'Ara
1967–68	Göztepe	Third round	0–2	(Socialist Federal Republic of Yugoslavia) Vojvodina	0–1 at 0–1 at
1968–69	Göztepe	Semi-finals	1–8	(Hungary) Újpest	1–4 at 0–4 at
1969–70	Altay	First round	0–1	(East Germany) Carl Zeiss Jena	0–1 at 0–0 at
1970–71	Eskişehirspor	Second round	4–8	(Netherlands) Twente	3–2 at 1–6 at
Intertoto Cup^{7}
1974	Altay	3rd in group stage	N/A	(Portugal) CUF, (Sweden) Landskrona, (Sweden) Hammarby	

^{1} Galatasaray retired from the competition having played two games against Olympiacos and their record was cancelled.
^{2} Fenerbahçe withdrew before the tournament's beginning.
^{3} Galatasaray withdrew from the tournament.
^{4} Zonguldakspor withdrew from the tournament.
^{5} Trabzonspor withdrew from the tournament.
^{6} Malatyaspor withdrew from the tournament.
^{7} The tournament was founded in 1961, but was only taken over by UEFA in 1995.

== Turkish women's football clubs in European competitions ==
By virtue of winning 2008–09 Turkey National Women's First League, Trabzonspor played in August 2009 in the Group D for qualification to the 2009–10 UEFA Women's Champions League. This was the first time ever a Turkish women's football team participated in the play-offs for the UEFA league established in the 2001–2002 season. The team won its first match against ŽNK Krka from Slovenia by 2–0, however lost the following plays to Torres Calcio Femminile of Italy by 0–9 and to Slovan Duslo Šaľa from Slovakia by 1–2. Trabzonspor women's team failed so to participate in the 2009–2010 UEFA Champions League.

In the following years, Gazi Üniversitesispor in 2010–11, Ataşehir Belediyespor, twice in 2011–12 and 2012–13, and Konak Belediyespor, also twice in 2013–14 and 2014–15, played in the UEFA Women's Champions League. In the 2013–14 season, Konak Belediyespor became the first ever Turkish women's team to play in the league's Round of 16 knockout phase.

As of 11 November 2026

Rank	Club	Pld	W	D	L	GF	GA	GD	W%	Pts	First Appearance	Last Appearance	Ref.
1	Konak Belediyespor	19	10	1	8	45	39	+6	52.63	**31**	2013–14 UWCL	2017–18 UWCL	
2	FOMGET	8	4	2	2	19	10	+9	50.00	**14**	2023–24 UWCL	2025–26 UWEC	
3	Fenerbahçe	6	3	1	2	8	7	+1	50.00	**10**	2026–27 UWCL	2026–27 UWEC	
4	Galatasaray	10	3	1	6	14	30	−16	30.00	**10**	2024–25 UWCL	2024–25 UWCL	
5	Beşiktaş	5	2	2	1	10	10	+0	40.00	**8**	2019–20 UWCL	2021–22 UWCL	
6	Ataşehir Belediyespor	9	2	2	5	18	29	−11	22.22	**8**	2011–12 UWCL	2018–19 UWCL	
7	Trabzonspor	3	1	0	2	3	11	−8	33.33	**3**	2009–10 UWCL	2009–10 UWCL	
8	ALG Spor	2	0	1	1	3	4	−1	0.00	**1**	2020–21 UWCL	2022–23 UWCL	
9	Gazi Üniversitesi	3	0	1	2	3	22	−19	0.00	**1**	2010–11 UWCL	2010–11 UWCL	
Total		**65**	**25**	**11**	**29**	**123**	**162**	**−39**	**38.46**	86			

=== UEFA Women's Champions League Performances ===
Note: Clubs in bold won the corresponding competition that season.

Season	Club	Progress	Score	Opponents	Venue(s)
2009–10	Trabzonspor	Qualifying round 3rd in Group D	N/A	(Italy) Torres, (Slovakia) Slovan Duslo Šaľa, (Slovenia) Krka	
2010–11	Gazi Üniversitesi	Qualifying round 4th in Group 1	N/A	(Denmark) Brøndby, (Bulgaria) NSA Sofia, (Moldova) Roma Calfa	
2011–12	Ataşehir Belediyespor	Qualifying round 3rd in Group 4	N/A	(Romania) Olimpia Cluj, (Bosnia and Herzegovina) SFK 2000 Sarajevo, (Lithuania) Gintra Universitetas	
2012–13	Ataşehir Belediyespor	Qualifying round 3rd in Group 1	N/A	(Switzerland) Zürich, (Slovenia) Pomurje, (Lithuania) Gintra Universitetas	
2013–14	Konak Belediyespor	Round of 16	0–6	(Austria) Neulengbach	0–3 at İzmir Alsancak Stadium; 0–3 at Wienerwaldstadion
2014–15	Konak Belediyespor	Qualifying round 2nd in Group 1	N/A	(Switzerland) Zürich, (Belarus) Minsk, (Latvia) Rīgas	
2015–16	Konak Belediyespor	Qualifying round 3rd in Group 1	N/A	(Belarus) Minsk, (Bosnia and Herzegovina) SFK 2000, (Albania) Vllaznia	
2016–17	Konak Belediyespor	Qualifying round 3rd in Group 9	N/A	(Netherlands) Twente, (Hungary) Ferencvárosi, (Malta) Hibernians	
2017–18	Konak Belediyespor	Qualifying round 2nd in Group 1	N/A	(Lithuania) Gintra Universitetas, (Slovakia) Partizán Bardejov, (Georgia (country)) Martve	
2018–19	Ataşehir Belediyespor	Qualifying round 3rd in Group 4	N/A	(Czech Republic) Slavia Prague, (Hungary) MTK Hungária, (Kosovo) Mitrovica	
2019–20	Beşiktaş	Qualifying round 2nd in Group 9	N/A	(Netherlands) Twente, (Poland) Górnik Łęczna, (Armenia) Alashkert	
2020–21	ALG Spor	First qualifying round	3–3 (a.e.t.), (2–3 p)	(Albania) Vllaznia	3–3 (a.e.t.), (2–3 p) at Loro Boriçi Stadium
2021–22	Beşiktaş	First qualifying round 3rd in Tournament 8	4–0	(North Macedonia) Kamenica Sasa	4–0 at Juventus Training Center
2022–23	ALG Spor	First qualifying round 3rd in Tournament 11	0–1	(Norway) Brann	0–1 at TSC Arena
2023–24	FOMGET	First qualifying round 3rd in Tournament 7	6–0	(Kosovo) EP-COM Hajvalia	6–0 at Loro Boriçi Stadium
2024–25	Galatasaray	Group stage 4th in Group A	N/A	(France) Lyon, (Germany) Wolfsburg, (Italy) Roma	
2025–26	FOMGET	Second qualifying round 3rd in Tournament 7	3–2	(Finland) HJK	3–2 at Töölö Football Stadium
2026–27	Fenerbahçe	Second qualifying round 2nd in Tournament 5	1–1 (a.e.t.), (2–4 p)	(Belgium) OH Leuven	1–1 (a.e.t.), (2–4 p) at Den Dreef

=== UEFA Women's Europa Cup Performances ===
Note: Clubs in bold won the corresponding competition that season.

Season	Club	Progress	Score	Opponents	Venue(s)
2025–26	FOMGET	First qualifying round	3–3 (a.e.t.), (2–3 p)	(Bosnia and Herzegovina) SFK 2000	0–0 at Koševo City Stadium; 3–3 (a.e.t.), (2–3 p) at Eryaman Stadium
2026–27	Fenerbahçe	Round of 16	0–4	(Spain) Real Sociedad	0–2 at Estadio Zubieta; 0–2 at Şükrü Saracoğlu Stadium

== UEFA Youth League ==
- 2025–26 UEFA Youth League

== UEFA Women's Champions League ==
- 2021–22 UEFA Women's Champions League - Qualification
- 2022–23 UEFA Women's Champions League - Qualification
- 2023–24 UEFA Women's Champions League - Qualification
- 2024–25 UEFA Women's Champions League - Final
- 2025–26 UEFA Women's Champions League - Qualification

== UEFA Women's Europa Cup ==
- 2025–26 UEFA Women's Europa Cup

== UEFA Futsal Champions League ==
- 2023–24 UEFA Futsal Champions League
- 2024–25 UEFA Futsal Champions League
- 2025–26 UEFA Futsal Champions League - Vangölü 3 Lose 19 GF 84 GA -65 GD

== Euro Winners Cup (Beach Soccer Clubs) ==
- 2022 Euro Winners Cup
- 2023 Euro Winners Cup
- 2024 Euro Winners Cup
- 2025 Euro Winners Cup

== See also ==
- Galatasaray S.K. in international football
