= 1993–94 1.Lig =

36th season of top-tier Turkish football

1.Lig
- Season: 1993–94
- Champions: Galatasaray (10th title)
- Relegated: Karabükspor; Karşıyaka; Sarıyer
- Champions League: Galatasaray
- Cup Winners' Cup: Beşiktaş
- UEFA Cup: Fenerbahçe; Trabzonspor
- Matches: 240
- Goals: 700 (2.92 per match)
- Top goalscorer: Bülent Uygun (22 goals)

The following are the statistics of the Turkish First Football League in season 1993–1994.

== Overview ==
Sixteen teams took part and Galatasaray S.K. won the championship. The teams Karabükspor, Karsiyaka and Sariyer got relegated.

== League table ==
| Pos | Team | Pld | W | D | L | GF | GA | GD | Pts | Qualification or relegation |
|---|---|---|---|---|---|---|---|---|---|---|
| 1 | Galatasaray (C) | 30 | 22 | 4 | 4 | 67 | 28 | +39 | 70 | Qualification to Champions League qualifying round |
| 2 | Fenerbahçe | 30 | 21 | 6 | 3 | 69 | 26 | +43 | 69 | Qualification to UEFA Cup preliminary round |
| 3 | Trabzonspor | 30 | 17 | 8 | 5 | 67 | 28 | +39 | 59 | Qualification to UEFA Cup first round |
| 4 | Beşiktaş | 30 | 16 | 6 | 8 | 58 | 30 | +28 | 54 | Qualification to Cup Winners' Cup first round |
| 5 | Samsunspor | 30 | 15 | 5 | 10 | 53 | 47 | +6 | 50 | |
| 6 | Kocaelispor | 30 | 14 | 6 | 10 | 44 | 45 | −1 | 48 | |
| 7 | Gençlerbirliği | 30 | 13 | 5 | 12 | 51 | 51 | 0 | 44 | |
| 8 | Gaziantepspor | 30 | 10 | 5 | 15 | 49 | 54 | −5 | 35 | |
| 9 | Bursaspor | 30 | 9 | 8 | 13 | 26 | 39 | −13 | 35 | |
| 10 | Altay | 30 | 8 | 8 | 14 | 33 | 45 | −12 | 32 | |
| 11 | MKE Ankaragücü | 30 | 8 | 7 | 15 | 37 | 52 | −15 | 31 | |
| 12 | Kayserispor | 30 | 8 | 7 | 15 | 31 | 49 | −18 | 31 | |
| 13 | Zeytinburnuspor | 30 | 8 | 6 | 16 | 33 | 51 | −18 | 30 | |
| 14 | Kardemir Karabükspor (R) | 30 | 7 | 7 | 16 | 35 | 62 | −27 | 28 | Relegation to Turkish Second Football League |
| 15 | Karşıyaka (R) | 30 | 7 | 6 | 17 | 19 | 43 | −24 | 27 | Relegation to Turkish Second Football League |
| 16 | Sarıyer (R) | 30 | 6 | 8 | 16 | 28 | 50 | −22 | 26 | Relegation to Turkish Second Football League |

Rules for classification: 1) points; 2) goal difference; 3) number of goals scored.
(C) Champions; (R) Relegated

== Results ==
| Home \ Away | ALT | BJK | BUR | FNB | GAL | GAZ | GEN | KRB | KSK | KAY | KOC | AGÜ | SAM | SAR | TRA | ZEY |
|---|---|---|---|---|---|---|---|---|---|---|---|---|---|---|---|---|
| Altay | | 3–2 | 0–0 | 1–2 | 0–2 | 3–1 | 1–0 | 3–2 | 1–1 | 3–1 | 2–2 | 0–0 | 2–3 | 2–1 | 2–2 | 1–0 |
| Beşiktaş | 3–0 | | 0–0 | 1–2 | 1–1 | 1–0 | 3–0 | 4–1 | 2–0 | 1–0 | 4–0 | 4–1 | 3–1 | 2–0 | 7–1 | 2–2 |
| Bursaspor | 0–1 | 0–0 | | 0–0 | 2–1 | 1–0 | 4–3 | 0–4 | 0–0 | 2–0 | 2–3 | 3–2 | 0–1 | 2–0 | 0–0 | 2–0 |
| Fenerbahçe | 3–2 | 2–1 | 2–0 | | 2–0 | 4–2 | 5–0 | 4–1 | 1–0 | 0–0 | 0–0 | 4–3 | 8–1 | 3–1 | 1–1 | 4–0 |
| Galatasaray | 3–1 | 1–0 | 2–0 | 2–1 | | 3–1 | 4–1 | 0–0 | 2–0 | 3–1 | 5–4 | 3–0 | 6–1 | 2–0 | 0–2 | 3–0 |
| Gaziantepspor | 1–0 | 2–1 | 3–0 | 0–2 | 3–4 | | 3–1 | 2–2 | 1–2 | 4–0 | 4–2 | 1–2 | 1–1 | 3–1 | 1–1 | 1–0 |
| Gençlerbirliği | 3–1 | 0–1 | 2–0 | 1–1 | 2–1 | 3–1 | | 6–1 | 0–0 | 4–0 | 1–2 | 1–1 | 2–1 | 3–1 | 0–2 | 3–0 |
| Kardemir Karabükspor | 2–1 | 2–1 | 1–2 | 2–3 | 0–0 | 2–2 | 1–2 | | 1–0 | 0–1 | 2–1 | 2–2 | 0–3 | 3–1 | 0–2 | 1–2 |
| Karşıyaka | 1–0 | 0–1 | 1–2 | 0–4 | 0–3 | 4–1 | 0–1 | 0–0 | | 1–0 | 0–0 | 1–2 | 0–2 | 1–2 | 1–0 | 1–4 |
| Kayserispor | 1–0 | 3–1 | 2–1 | 1–1 | 1–2 | 1–4 | 1–3 | 0–1 | 0–0 | | 4–0 | 2–1 | 1–0 | 2–2 | 1–1 | 4–1 |
| Kocaelispor | 1–1 | 1–1 | 1–0 | 1–0 | 1–3 | 3–1 | 3–0 | 2–1 | 1–0 | 2–1 | | 2–0 | 3–2 | 2–1 | 1–2 | 1–0 |
| MKE Ankaragücü | 0–0 | 1–3 | 3–1 | 1–2 | 2–4 | 2–1 | 0–3 | 1–1 | 2–0 | 3–0 | 1–2 | | 0–1 | 1–0 | 2–0 | 0–3 |
| Samsunspor | 2–0 | 0–0 | 4–0 | 2–0 | 1–1 | 1–2 | 2–2 | 5–1 | 1–2 | 5–2 | 3–2 | 3–1 | | 0–0 | 0–3 | 2–0 |
| Sarıyer | 1–0 | 0–3 | 1–1 | 2–5 | 0–2 | 1–1 | 2–1 | 3–1 | 2–0 | 0–0 | 0–0 | 1–1 | 1–3 | | 0–1 | 1–0 |
| Trabzonspor | 4–1 | 4–2 | 1–1 | 0–1 | 1–2 | 3–1 | 6–0 | 6–0 | 5–0 | 3–1 | 2–0 | 1–1 | 4–0 | 4–2 | | 5–0 |
| Zeytinburnuspor | 1–1 | 2–3 | 1–0 | 0–2 | 0–2 | 3–1 | 3–3 | 3–0 | 2–3 | 0–0 | 2–1 | 3–1 | 0–2 | 1–1 | 0–0 | |

Source: TFF, Mackolik
Legend: Blue = home team win; Yellow = draw; Red = away team win.

== Top scorers ==
| Rank | Player | Club | Goals |
|---|---|---|---|
| 1 | (Turkey) Bülent Uygun | Fenerbahçe | 22 |
| 2 | (Zaire) Andre Kona N'Gole | Gençlerbirliği | 19 |
| 3 | (Turkey) Saffet Sancaklı | Kocaelispor | 18 |
| 4 | (Turkey) Ertuğrul Sağlam | Beşiktaş | 17 |
| 5 | (Turkey) Hakan Şükür | Galatasaray | 16 |
| 6 | (Georgia (country)) Shota Arveladze | Trabzonspor | 15 |
| 6 | (Turkey) Feyyaz Uçar | Beşiktaş | 15 |
| 6 | (Turkey) Hami Mandıralı | Trabzonspor | 15 |
| 9 | (Turkey) Aykut Kocaman | Fenerbahçe | 14 |
| 9 | (Turkey) Mecnur Çolak | Fenerbahçe | 14 |
