= 1991–92 Balkans Cup =

Tournament details
- Teams: 5

Final positions
- Champions: (Turkey) Sarıyer (1st title)
- Runners-up: (Romania) Oțelul Galați

Tournament statistics
- Matches played: 8
- Goals scored: 19 (2.38 per match)

The 1991–92 season of the Balkans Cup club tournament was the 26th season of the competition. It was won by Turkish side Sarıyer in the final against Romanian Oțelul Galați for their first title in the competition.

== Quarter-finals ==
Team 1	Agg.	Team 2	1st leg	2nd leg
Sarıyer (Turkey)	3–1	(Bulgaria) Hebar Pazardzhik	2–0	1–1

=== First leg ===
17 September 1991

Sarıyer (Turkey)	2–0	(Bulgaria) Hebar Pazardzhik
Mehmet Kaplan 27'; Bayram 87' (pen.)	Report

Yusuf Ziya Öniş, Sarıyer

=== Second leg ===
1 October 1991

Hebar Pazardzhik (Bulgaria)	1–1	(Turkey) Sarıyer
Goal	Report	Demir 65'

Georgi Benkovski, Pazardzhik

Sarıyer won 3–1 on aggregate.

== Semi-finals ==
Team 1	Agg.	Team 2	1st leg	2nd leg
Tomori Berat (Albania)	2–4	(Romania) Oțelul Galați	2–0	0–4
Sarıyer (Turkey)	5–3	(Greece) Ethnikos Piraeus	5–0	0–3

=== First leg ===
7 November 1991

Tomori Berat (Albania)	2–0	(Romania) Oțelul Galați

Tomori Stadium, Berat

29 October 1991

Sarıyer (Turkey)	5–0	(Greece) Ethnikos
Demir 3'; Osman Yıldırım 38'; Çolak 41'; Güzeltepe 71'; Bayram 82' (pen.)	Report

Yusuf Ziya Öniş Stadium, Sarıyer
Attendance: 615
Referee: Zdravko Jokić (Yugoslavia)

=== Second leg ===
20 November 1991

Oțelul Galați (Romania)	4–0	(Albania) Tomori Berat

Stadionul Oțelul, Galați

Oțelul Galați won 4–2 on aggregate.

12 November 1991

Ethnikos (Greece)	3–0	(Turkey) Sarıyer

Karaiskakis Stadium, Piraeus

Sarıyer won 5–3 on aggregate.

== Finals ==
=== First leg ===
31 March 1992

Oțelul Galați (Romania)	0–0	(Turkey) Sarıyer

Oțelul, Galați
Referee: Giorgos Koukoules (Greece)

=== Second leg ===
14 April 1992

Sarıyer (Turkey)	1–0	(Romania) Oțelul Galați
Çolak 73'	Report

Yusuf Ziya Öniş, Istanbul
Attendance: 3,382
Referee: Branimir Babarogić (Yugoslavia)

Sarıyer won 1–0 on aggregate.
