= Sercan =

Sercan is a masculine Turkish given name. Notable people with the name include:

- Sercan Görgülü, Turkish footballer
- Sercan Güvenışık, Turkish footballer
- Sercan Sararer, Turkish footballer
- Sercan Yıldırım, Turkish footballer
