= Bozkurt Aran =

Turkish diplomat

Permanent Representative of Turkey to the WTO
- In office 1 October 2007 – 19 March 2012

Ambassador of Turkey to Iran
- In office 31 March 2004 – 19 January 2006

Permanent Representative of Turkey to UNESCO
- In office 1 January 2002 – 1 January 2004

Ambassador of Turkey to Pakistan
- In office 26 February 1998 – 17 December 1999

Personal details
- Born: 17 April 1947 (age 78)
- Education: Ankara University

Halit Bozkurt Aran (born 17 April 1947) is a Turkish diplomat and academic. He currently teaches at TOBB Economics and Technology University, in the Department of International Relations.

== Education and early career ==
Aran graduated from Ankara University Faculty of Political Sciences in 1971. Then he began working at the Ministry of Foreign Affairs in 1973. In 1976, he started working as Assistant Consul in Salzburg.

== Senior career ==
After various assignments, Aran served as Turkey's Ambassador to Pakistan between 1998 and 2000, Director General for Bilateral Economic Affairs from 2000 to 2002, the Permanent Representative to UNESCO from 2002 to 2004, the Ambassador to Iran from 2004 to 2006, and Director General for the Middle East from 2006 to 2007.

From 1 October 2007, to 19 March 2012, he served as the Permanent Representative of Turkey to the World Trade Organization and retired on April 17, 2012.

== Personal life ==
During his tenure as the Ambassador of Pakistan, he lost his daughter İrem Aran and wife Şenay Aran in a traffic accident in 1999. His other daughter, Zeynep Aran, survived the accident but sustained severe injuries.
