= List of ambassadors of Turkey to WTO =

The list of ambassadors of Turkey to the World Trade Organization comprises diplomats responsible for representing Turkey's interests within the organization.

== List of ambassadors ==
| # | Ambassador | Term start | Term end | Ref. |
|---|---|---|---|---|
| 1 | Ahmet Mithat Balkan | 7 November 1996 | 16 November 1998 | |
| 2 | Ömer Ersun | 15 November 1998 | 1 August 2000 | |
| 3 | Mustafa Oğuz Demiralp | 31 July 2000 | 19 July 2002 | |
| 4 | Mehmet Kazım Görkay | 21 July 2002 | 26 November 2004 | |
| 5 | Ahmet Deniz Bölükbaşı | 29 November 2004 | 18 May 2007 | |
| 6 | Halit Bozkurt Aran | 1 October 2007 | 19 March 2012 | |
| 7 | Selim Kuneralp | 11 September 2012 | 17 March 2014 | |
| 8 | Mehmet Haluk Ilıcak | 17 March 2014 | 14 November 2016 | |
| 9 | Kemal Madenoğlu | 15 November 2016 | 5 May 2021 | |
| 10 | Alparslan Acarsoy | 13 May 2021 | 1 March 2025 | |
| 11 | Hakan Çakıl | 1 March 2025 | Present | |

== See also ==
- World Trade Organization
- Ministry of Foreign Affairs
- List of diplomatic missions of Turkey
