= List of ambassadors of Turkey to Ireland =

The list of ambassadors of Turkey to Ireland provides a chronological record of individuals who have served as the diplomatic representatives of the Republic of Turkey to Ireland.

== List of ambassadors ==
Ambassador	Term start	Term end	Ref.
Celal Akbay	10 December 1973	21 July 1978	
Ahmet Asım Akyamaç	25 July 1978	10 November 1980	
Gündoğdu Üstün	11 December 1980	11 March 1985	
S. Nahit Toker	11 November 1985	1 April 1988	Unknown
Halil Dağ	29 March 1988	15 April 1993	
Taner Baytok	15 April 1993	30 September 1995	
N. Murat Ersavcı	4 October 1995	29 November 1998	
S. Günaltay Şibay	1 December 1998	27 December 2002	
Ahmet Berki Dibek	13 January 2003	8 January 2007	
Turan Moralı	15 January 2007	31 August 2008	
Ahmet Altay Cengizer	1 April 2009	11 February 2013	
Necip Egüz	14 February 2013	23 September 2016	
Levent Murat Burhan	14 November 2016	16 March 2021	
Mehmet Hakan Olcay	1 April 2021	1 May 2025	
Esra Cankorur	15 May 2025	Present	
