= List of ambassadors of Turkey to UNESCO =

The list of ambassadors of Turkey to UNESCO comprises diplomats responsible for representing Turkey's interests within the United Nations Educational, Scientific, and Cultural Organization (UNESCO). Turkey has been an active member of UNESCO since 4 November 1946.

== List of ambassadors ==
#	Ambassador	Term start	Term end	Ref.
1	Munis Faik Ozansoy	1 January 1971	1 January 1975	
2	Veysel Versan	1 January 1976	1 January 1978	
3	Pertev Subaşı	1 January 1978	1 January 1981	
4	Mehmet Haluk Sayınsoy	1 January 1981	1 January 1983	
5	Nazif Cuhruk	1 January 1983	1 January 1984	
6	Mehmet Yalçın Kurtbay	1 January 1985	1 January 1989	
7	Pulat Yüksel Tacar	1 January 1989	1 January 1995	
8	Ömer Engin Lütem	1 January 1995	1 January 1997	
9	Turhan Fırat	1 January 1997	1 January 2002	
10	Halil Bozkurt Aran	1 January 2002	1 January 2004	
11	Numan Hazar	1 January 2004	1 January 2006	
12	Ali Tınaz Tuygan	1 January 2006	1 January 2009	
13	Hüsnü Gürcan Türkoğlu	16 June 2011	1 December 2012	
14	Hüseyin Avni Botsalı	15 March 2014	1 November 2016	
15	Ahmet Altay Cengizer	31 October 2016	22 October 2019	
16	Ahmet Altay Cengizer	18 January 2020	30 November 2021	
17	Gülnur Aybet	15 December 2021	Present	

== See also ==
- UNESCO
- Ministry of Foreign Affairs
- List of diplomatic missions of Turkey
