= Serdar Bozkurt =

Turkish football manager (born 1977)

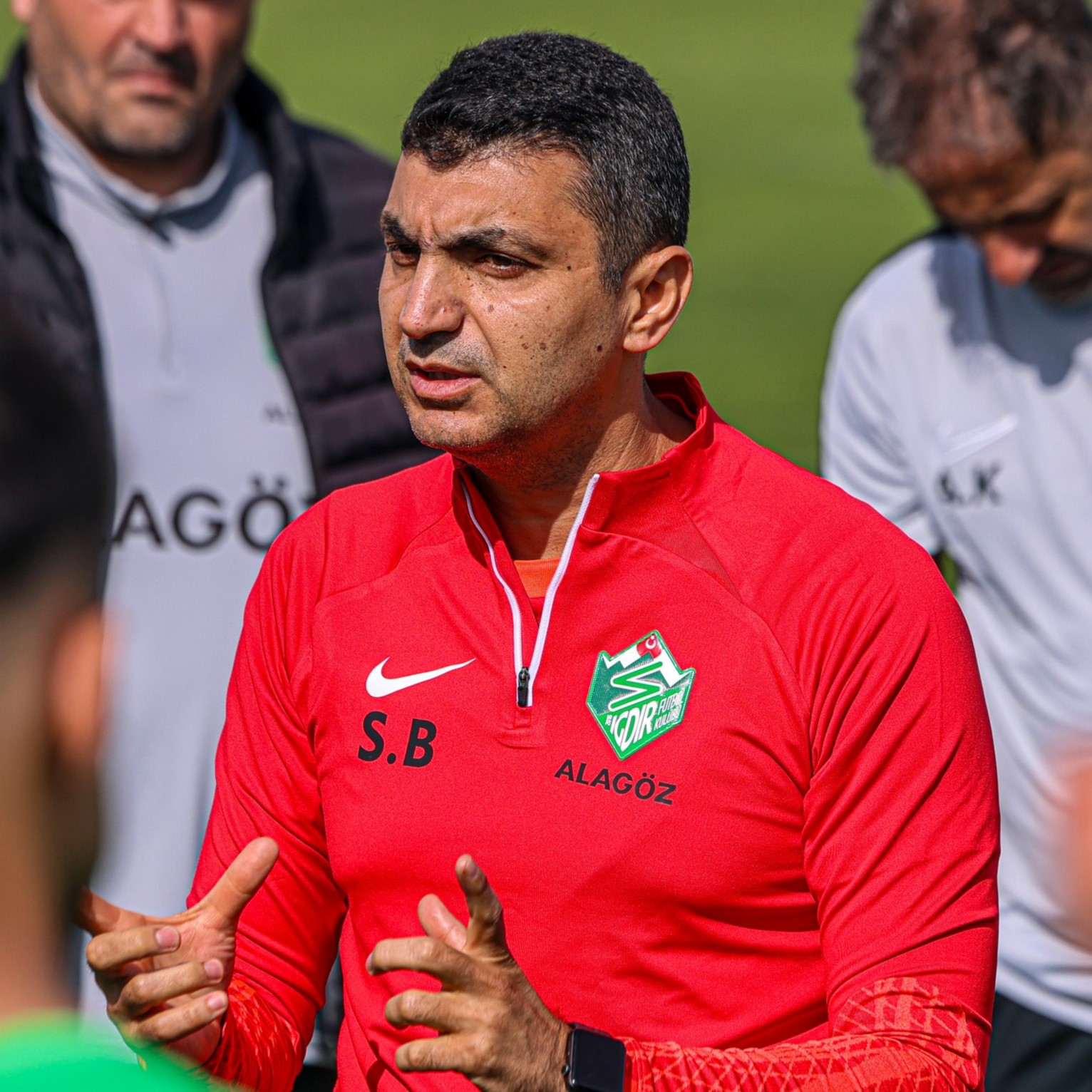

Personal information
- Date of birth: 28 April 1977 (age 49)
- Place of birth: Gaziantep, Turkey

Team information
- Current team: Tarsus İdman Yurdu (manager)

Managerial career
- Years: Team
- 2008–2010: Ankara Demirspor (assistant)
- 2011–2014: Çubukspor (assistant)
- 2014–2015: Ankara Demirspor
- 2015–2016: Çorum Belediyespor
- 2017–2018: Sivas Belediyespor
- 2018–2019: Sarıyer
- 2019–2020: Bandırmaspor
- 2021: Sakaryaspor
- 2021: Şanlıurfaspor
- 2021–2022: Şanlıurfaspor
- 2022: Tarsus İdman Yurdu
- 2023: Şanlıurfaspor
- 2023: Amedspor
- 2024: Iğdır

Serdar Bozkurt (born 28 April 1977) is a Turkish football manager who last coached Iğdır.
