= Ahmet Bozkurt =

Turkish poet, playwright and essayist

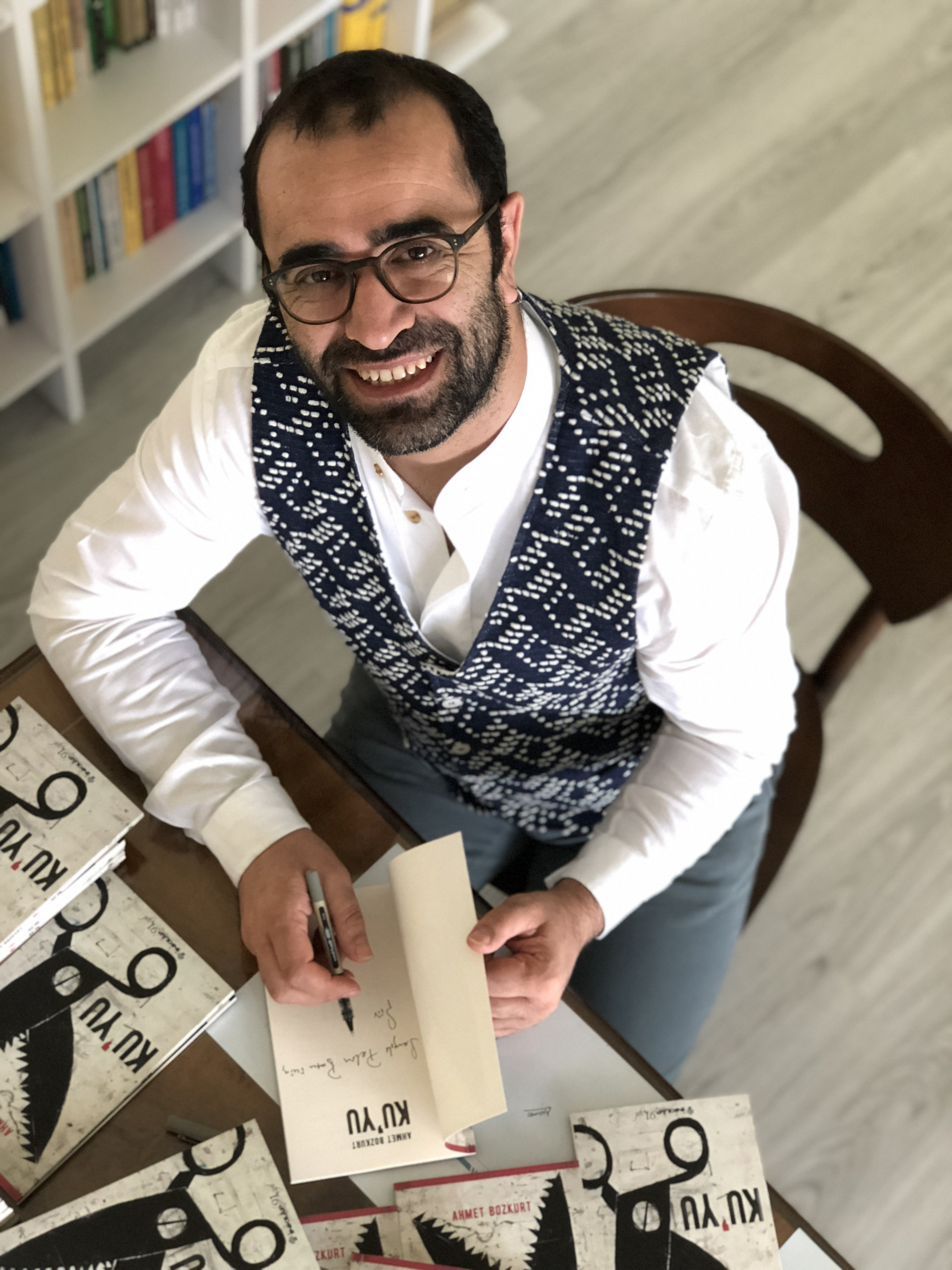

Ahmet Bozkurt (born 11 September 1977) is a Turkish poet, essayist, novelist and editor.

== Biography ==
Bozkurt was born on 11 September 1977 in Erzincan, Turkey. He took part in the committee of the edition of the review titled "Taşra" which had been published in Erzincan with his friends between 1998 and 1999. He started to publish the review titled "Le poète travaille" on 2000 in Erzincan. "Le poète travaille" has become the fund of a negotiation inflamed of the concepts such as province, center and autochthon in Turkish literature. Graduated from Dramaturgy from the Dokuz Eylül University of the Fine Arts Department. Member of the Cumali- Seferi, Gökyüzü Derneği and of PEN. He published plays of theatre, essays, literary and picturesque critics with his work of arts in the pursuit of the sensitiveness to the origin of the truth of the existential memory and creation of the poetry in the language and lingual functions of the self-subject, the self in the poetry, the formation of the artistic language, structuralism, postmodernism-modernism, the philosophy of language and the poems. His essays on the painting and the poetry took place in numerous common books. He presented proceedings in symposiums of poetry and literature. He is still living in Istanbul and is the editor of a publishing house.

== Bibliography ==
- Şair Çalışıyor, Istanbul 2007, Şiirden Yayınları.
- Varlık Tutulması: Jean-Paul Sartre Tiyatrosunda Varlık ve Hiçlik, Istanbul 2012, Ayrıntı Yayınları.
- Orpheus’un Bakışı, Istanbul 2014, Ayrıntı Yayınları.
- Unutma Zamanı: Yazı, Bellek ve Eleştiri, Istanbul 2015.
- Mum Lekesi: Eleştirinin Kıyıları, Istanbul 2016.
- Şiir-Fragmanlar: Her Yüz Bir Dünyadır, Istanbul 2017.
- Ku’yu, Istanbul 2018.
- Montaigne, Denemeler Istanbul 2018.
- Dünyadan 100 Aşk Şiiri, Istanbul 2020.
