= Hakan Çakıl =

Turkish diplomat

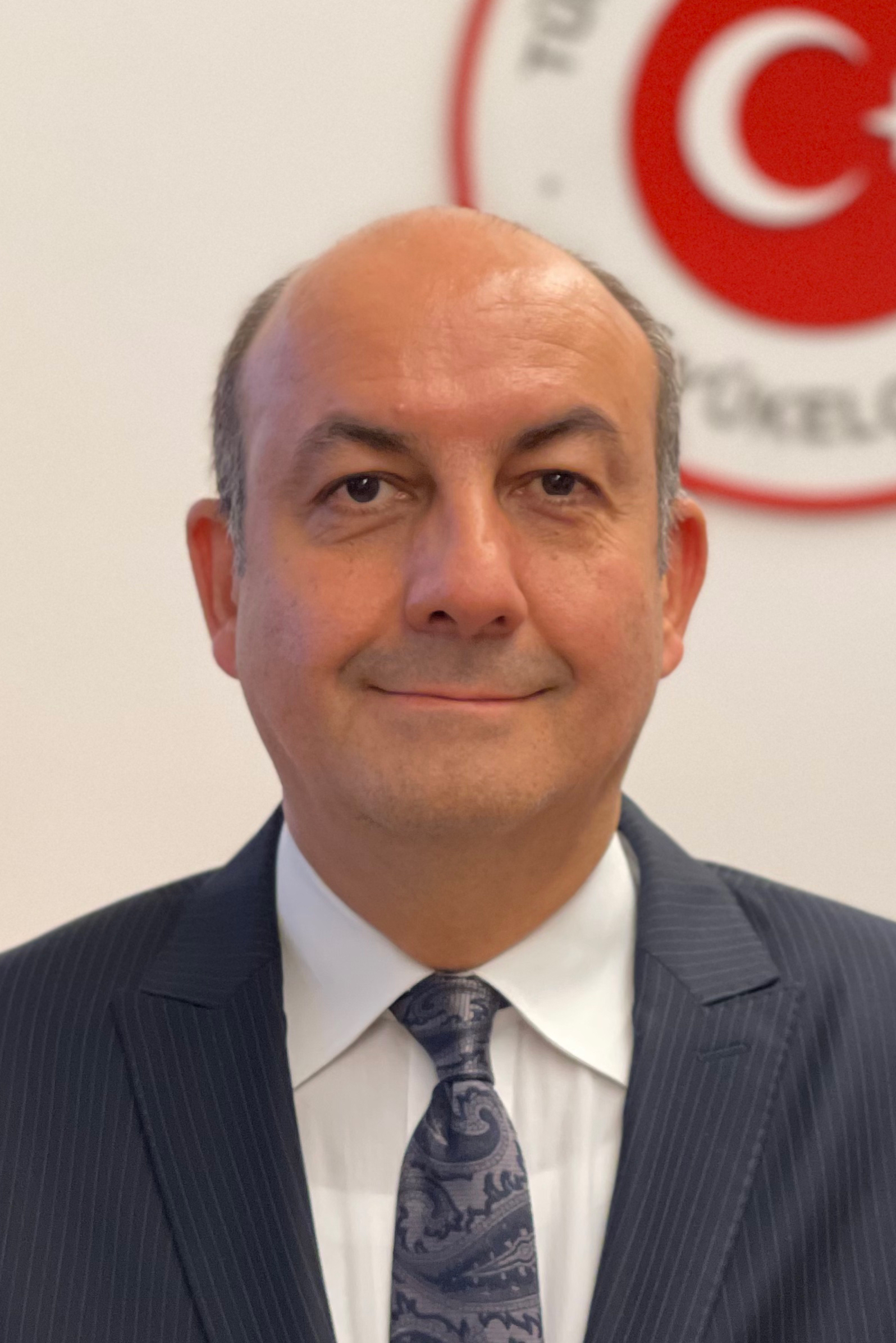

Turkish Permanent Representative to the WTO
- Incumbent
- Assumed office 1 March 2025
- Preceded by: Alparslan Acarsoy

Turkish Ambassador to Lebanon
- In office 4 July 2018 – 28 February 2021
- Preceded by: Çağatay Erciyes
- Succeeded by: Ali Barış Ulusoy

Turkish Ambassador to Nigeria
- In office 15 August 2015 – 18 June 2018
- Preceded by: Mustafa Pulat
- Succeeded by: Melih Ulueren

Personal details
- Born: 23 September 1964 (age 61) Ankara, Turkey
- Spouse: Esin Çakıl
- Children: 1
- Education: Middle East Technical University (BA)

Hakan Çakıl (Turkish pronunciation: [ˈhaːkan ˈtʃakɯl]; born 23 September 1964) is a Turkish diplomat who is the permanent representative of Turkey to the World Trade Organization (WTO) since March 1, 2025. He served as the Turkish ambassador to Lebanon from April 7, 2018, to February 28, 2021, and during his tenure in Beirut, he experienced the massive explosion on August 4, 2020. The explosion caused significant damage to the ambassador's residence, although Çakıl himself was not injured.

Following the Beirut explosion, Çakıl, representing the Turkish government, offered his nation's hand in repairing and restoring the Saint George Maronite Cathedral and the Mohammad Al-Amin Mosque in an Al Jazeera Arabic appearance. He discussed Lebanon's dire economic circumstances at the time of the explosion in an interview with Anadolu Agency. He also discussed Turkey's response to the crisis, and the general aftermath of the Beirut explosion in a CNN Turk interview.

On the aftermath of 2023 Turkey–Syria earthquakes, Çakıl was stationed to Hatay, a city devastated by its close proximity to the earthquake's epicenter, where he coordinated with international rescue teams from Vietnam, Indonesia, and Bosnia. From March 2023 to March 2025 he served as representative of the Foreign Ministry in Diyarbakır, the largest Kurdish-majority city in Turkey. Previously, he served as the Turkish ambassador to Nigeria from August 15, 2015, to June 18, 2018.

== Life and career ==
Born in Ankara, he spent his childhood and early adulthood in the Turkish capital where he earned a bachelor's degree in Sociology from Middle East Technical University. Çakıl began his career at the Turkish Ministry of Foreign Affairs in 1990. He held various diplomatic positions in Turkey's embassies to Kuwait, Austria, the Netherlands, and Northern Cyprus prior to his ambassadorial roles. His wife, Esin Çakıl (née Özkan), is a fellow diplomat and ambassador.
