= List of ambassadors of Turkey to Iran =

Ambassadors of Turkey

Ambassador of Turkey to Iran
- Emblem of the Turkish Embassy in Tehran
- Incumbent; Derya Örs
- Ministry of Foreign Affairs; Embassy of Turkey in Tehran
- Style: His Excellency
- Reports to: Minister of Foreign Affairs
- Seat: Tehran
- Appointer: President of Turkey
- Term length: At the pleasure of the president
- Formation: 1925
- First holder: Hasan Vasfi Menteş
- Website: http://tahran.be.mfa.gov.tr/

The ambassador extraordinary and plenipotentiary of Turkey to Iran is the official representative of the president and the government of Turkey to the president and the government of Iran.

The ambassador and their staff work at large in the Embassy of Turkey in Tehran. There are consulate generals in Mashad, Urmia and Tabriz.

The post of Turkish ambassador to Iran is currently held by Derya Örs.
