= Mecnur Çolak =

Turkish footballer (1967–2021)

Personal information
- Full name: Mecnur Çolak
- Date of birth: 7 August 1967
- Place of birth: Razgrad, Bulgaria
- Date of death: 11 December 2021 (aged 54)
- Position: Forward

Senior career*
| Years | Team | Apps | (Gls) |
| 1985–1989 | Ludogorets Razgrad | 112 | (23) |
| 1990–1993 | Sarıyer | 88 | (22) |
| 1993–1995 | Fenerbahçe | 48 | (17) |
| 1995–1996 | Denizlispor | 24 | (3) |
| 1996–1997 | Adana Demirspor | 7 | (2) |
| 1997–1998 | Beykozspor | 16 | (4) |
| Total | | 295 | (71) |
- * Club domestic league appearances and goals

Mecnur Çolak (7 August 1967 – 11 December 2021) was a Turkish-Bulgarian professional footballer who played as a forward.

== Biography ==
Çolak played for Ludogorets Razgrad in his birth country Bulgaria and in Turkey for Süper Lig clubs Sarıyer, Fenerbahçe, Denizlispor and Adana Demirspor.

He died from a brain hemorrhage related to the complications of COVID-19, on 11 December 2021, at the age of 54.
