= Sercan Görgülü =

Turkish footballer

Sercan Görgülü (born 5 December 1960) is a Turkish former footballer who played as a forward.

== Career ==
Görgülü began playing youth football for Muğlaspor in 1977. He transferred to Boluspor in 1980 and became a professional. He transferred to Zonguldakspor in 1983 and Sarıyer in 1985. He transferred to Fenerbahçe during the winter break of the 1990–91 season, but he did not succeed at Fenerbahçe and returned to Sarıyer during the winter break of the 1991–92 season. He transferred to Marmarisspor in 1995 and aimed promotion of her team to Second League in 1996–97 season. He transferred to Alibeyköyspor, who was an amateur team in İstanbul. He was also coach of her. He retired from football after Alibeyköyspor's promotion to old Third League in 1998–99 season.

He played twice for Turkey, twice for Turkey U21 and twice for Turkish Olympic Team.
