= Ahmet Altay Cengizer =

Turkish diplomat (1954–2026)

Permanent delegate to the UNESCO
- In office 31 October 2016 – 30 November 2021

President of the General conference of the UNESCO
- In office 2019 – November 2021
- Succeeded by: Santiago Irazabal Mourao

Personal details
- Born: 22 October 1954 Istanbul, Turkey
- Died: 8 April 2026 (aged 71)
- Resting place: Karacaahmet Cemetery
- Citizenship: Turkish
- Education: Boğaziçi University (BA); London School of Economics (MA)
- Occupation: Diplomat

Ahmet Altay Cengizer (22 October 1954 – 8 April 2026) was a Turkish diplomat and the permanent delegate at the UNESCO for Turkey and a past president of the General Conference of the UNESCO.

== Education ==
Cengizer graduated with a Bachelor's degree in Political science from Boğaziçi University in Istanbul in 1977. He followed up on his studies at the London School of Economics where he graduated with a Master of Arts degree in International History.

== Diplomatic career ==
Cenziger's diplomatic career began in 1984, and he was subsequently posted to several Turkish embassies. His diplomatic service at International organizations began in 2001 when he began to serve in the office of the Turkish delegate to the United Nations in New York, to which he was posted until 2005. From 2005 until 2006 he served as the Turkish ambassador to Tajikistan and from 2009 until 2016, he served as the Turkish Ambassador to Ireland. In October of the same year he was appointed the permanent Turkish delegate to UNESCO and was later elected to the executive board of the organization for the term between 2017 and 2021. In 2019 he was elected to preside over the General Conference of UNESCO for the term between 2019 and 2021. His tenure was marked by the COVID-19 pandemic. In November 2021 he was succeeded by Santiago Irazabal Mourao of Brazil.

== Views ==
Cenziger was a supporter of Turkey's accession into the European Union arguing that Turkey is the only Muslim country developing democratically and the most industrially developed between Japan and Austria.

== Death ==
Cengizer died on 8 April 2026, at the age of 71. On 11 April, he was buried at Karacaahmet Cemetery.
