= Yusuf Ziya Öniş Stadium =

Multi-purpose stadium in Istanbul, Turkey

Coordinates: 41.1725°N 29.0503°E

Yusuf Ziya Öniş Stadyumu
- Interactive map of Yusuf Ziya Öniş Stadyumu
- Location: Istanbul, Turkey
- Owner: Ministry of Youth and Sports
- Capacity: 4,100
- Surface: Turf
- Field size: 105 by 68 metres (115 yd × 74 yd)

Construction
- Groundbreaking: 1987
- Opened: 23 January 1988
- Renovated: 2005, 2009, 2023, 2025

Tenant
- Sarıyer S.K.

Yusuf Ziya Öniş Stadium (Turkish: Yusuf Ziya Öniş Stadyumu) is a multi-purpose stadium in Istanbul, Turkey. It is currently used mostly for association football matches and is the home ground of TFF First League team Sarıyer S.K. The stadium has a capacity of approximately 4,100 spectators. The stadium is named after Yusuf Ziya Öniş, one of the founders of Sarıyer S.K. and one of the first general secretaries of the Turkish Football Federation.

Beşiktaş's U19 team played their UEFA Youth League matches at the stadium until 2021. In 2017, the stadium hosted the final of the Turkish Gridiron Football First League.

Construction of the stadium began in 1987, and it opened on 23 January 1988 with a match between Sarıyer and Sakaryaspor. It is suitable for FIFA and UEFA matches, measuring 105 by 68 metres, and has a natural grass surface. The stadium underwent four renovations: the first in 2005, during which the north stand was covered; the second in 2009, when the main grandstand was partially reconstructed and all sections of the stadium were roofed; the third in 2023, when the stadium was adapted for night matches and the roof was rebuilt, and most recently in 2025 lighting, sound systems and all seats were renewed.
