= Sarıyer S.K. =

Sarıyer
- Full name: Sarıyer Spor Kulübü
- Nicknames: Beyaz Martı (White Seagulls); Formerly: İstanbul'un dördüncü büyüğü (Istanbul's fourth major team)
- Founded: 1920; 106 years ago as Sarıyer Gençlik Kulübü; 1932; 94 years ago as Sarıyer Gençler Mahfili; 1940; 86 years ago as Sarıyer Gençlik Kulübü
- Ground: Yusuf Ziya Öniş Stadium, Istanbul
- Capacity: 4,100
- Coordinates: 41°10′21″N 29°03′01″E
- Chairman: Ahmet Emre Yaldız
- Manager: Umut Eskiköy
- League: TFF 1. Lig
- 2025–26: TFF 1. Lig, 12th of 20
- Website: sariyersporkulubu.com.tr/
| Home colours | Away colours | Third colours |

Sarıyer Spor Kulübü, known as SMS Grup Sarıyer Spor Kulübü due to sponsorship reasons, is a Turkish sports club located in Sarıyer, Istanbul. The football team plays in the TFF 1. Lig, the second tier of Turkish football. Sarıyer won the Balkans Cup in 1991–92 season against Romanian club Oțelul Galați with results: 0–0 away and 1–0 after extra time at home.

Domestically, the club has won the TFF 1. Lig on one, the TFF 2. Lig on two, and the TFF 3. Lig on one occasion. The club finished fourth in the Süper Lig on three occasions, achieving this position in the 1985–86, 1988–89, and 1990–91 seasons.

Sarıyer S.K. served as a career platform for many prominent figures in Turkish football, including national team players and media personalities. Notable names who played for the club include Rıdvan Dilmen, Selçuk Yula, Saffet Sancaklı, Sinan Engin, İsmail Kartal, and Cemil Turan.

== History ==
Founded in 1940, Sarıyer Spor Kulübü underwent three important stages in its establishment. These three stages were:

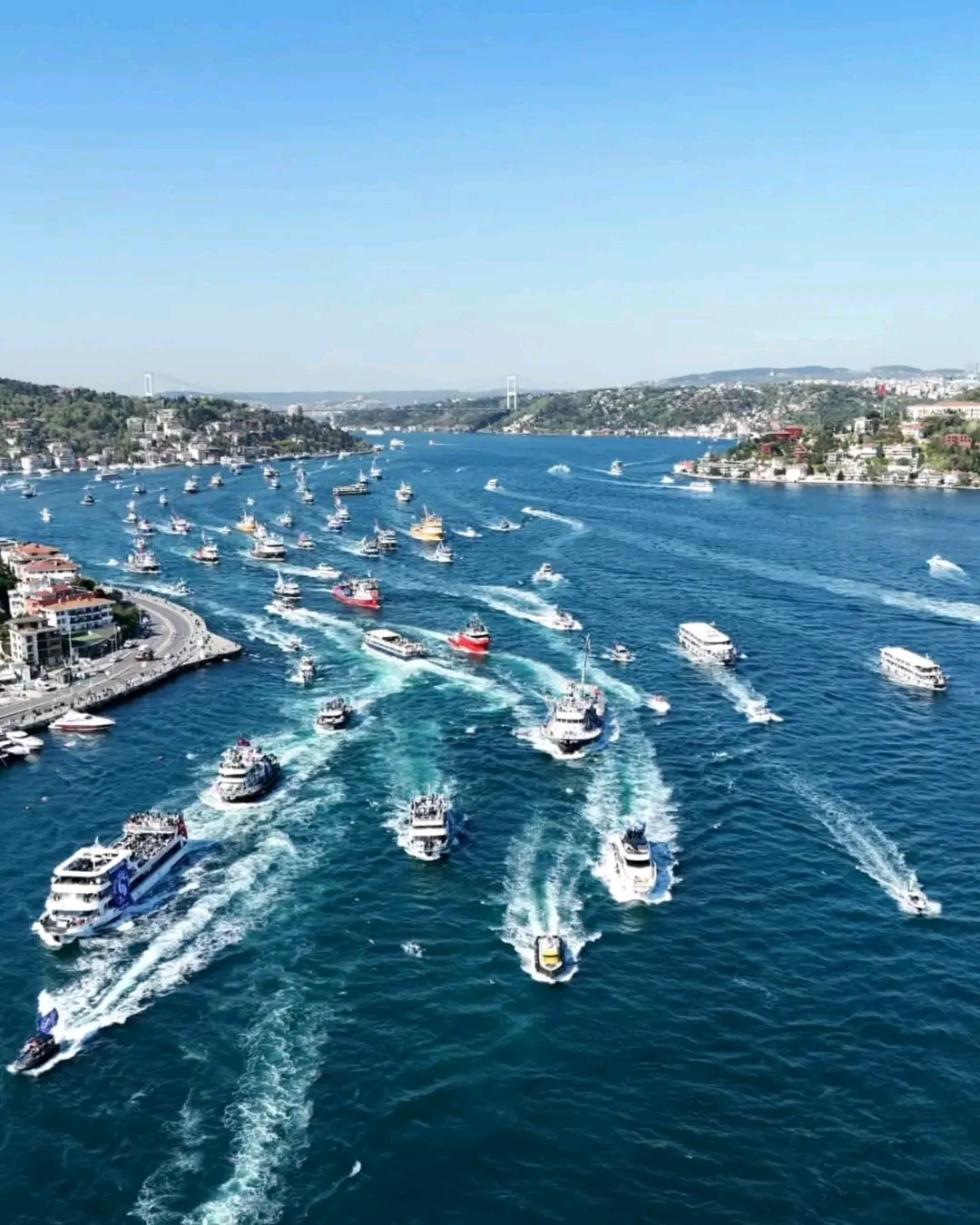
Sarıyer's TFF Second League championship celebrations in 2025

- Sarıyer Gençler Cemiyeti
- Sarıyer Gençler Mahfili
- Sarıyer Gençlik Kulübü

=== Sarıyer Gençler Cemiyeti ===
The Sarıyer Gençler Cemiyeti was founded in 1920. The colour of the association's football team jersey was burgundy and orange. The Sarıyer Gençler Cemiyeti played its first match against Beykoz Zindeler, which ended in a 2-2 draw.

On Friday, 2 October 1923, during a match played by the Sarıyer Gençler Cemiyeti at the Çayırbaşı Stadium, a fire broke out in Sarıyer and a large part of Sarıyer was burned to ashes. The firefighters, who were responsible for extinguishing the fire, were unable to reach the fire because they were at the Çayırbaşı Stadium for the match.

Due to financial difficulties, the activities of the Sarıyer Gençler Cemiyeti slowed down between 1927 and 1930, then came to a complete halt, and the Sarıyer Gençler Cemiyeti disbanded.

=== Sarıyer Gençler Mahfili ===
The Sarıyer Gençler Mahfili was founded in 1932 at the Sarıbaba Dergah in Sarıyer, a building that had long served as a Naqshbandi Dergah; after the closure of tekkes and zawiyas, it was used for a time as a coffin storage room for the Ali Kethüda Mosque, later became the CHP district headquarters, and was eventually transferred to the newly established Sarıyer Gençler Mahfili.

The Sarıyer Gençler Mahfili engaged in football, volleyball, wrestling, and cycling, as well as music and theater activities. The Sarıyer Gençler Mahfili played its matches wearing the same jersey as its predecessor, the Sarıyer Gençlik Kulübü. The Sarıyer Gençler Mahfili its first known match on 18 April 1932, against the Çubuklu team. The match was abandoned when Muhterem Saygın, who was playing right back for Sarıyer, broke his leg. The Sarıyer Gençler Mahfili remained highly active until 1938. Although there was no formal organization between 1938 and 1940, the young people of Sarıyer continued to play matches under the name of the Sarıyer Gençler Mahfili, thus preserving the core team.

Among the founders of Sarıyer Gençler Mahfili were Celadet, Siret, and Recai Barbarosoğlu brothers, teacher İzzet Aykol, Yusuf Yarar, Çırçırlı Hakim Şükrü Peşken, teacher Kazım Esen, cleaning supervisor Hüsamettin Efendi, clerk Muzaffer Bey, Haydan Öcal, Mahzar Diker, Dr. Turhan Bey, Teacher's Deputy Selahattin Bey, Reşat Pamir, Pharmacist İzzet Ağatan, Cahit Durmaz, Attorney Zekai Dirmil, İsmail Teczan, and Salih Dikmen Bey.

=== Sarıyer Gençlik Kulübü ===
The establishment of Sarıyer Gençlik Kulübü was the result of coordinated efforts by local officials and community members. District Governor Hüsnü Uğural, along with Cahit Durmaz, Reşat Pamir, and several football players of the time such as Selahattin Yarar, Müfit Güven, Fikret Canlı, Sabri Erimli, İsmail Erönde, İsmail Kızıltuğ, Ahmet Canel, Nazım Özbay, Mustafa Kocamaz, Numan Uzun, Melih Kınalılar, Celal Demir, and Zekeriye Toksavul played key roles in the club's foundation. Initially, the club operated without official registration. Efforts were subsequently made by its members to obtain formal recognition and complete the registration process. The constitution and other formalities were prepared, and the application for establishment was submitted in July 1940. Thus, the establishment of the Sarıyer Gençlik Kulübü was officially recorded as 1940. At this stage, Kemal Halim Gürgen, who was also the founder of the İstanbulspor, provided significant financial support to the Sarıyer Gençlik Kulübü.

Between 1940 and 1956, Sarıyer Gençlik Kulübü participated in amateur football matches only and did not have a professional branch. During this period, the club also participated in handball competitions and achieved a second place in the Istanbul Handball League. Volleyball and basketball branches were also opened during this period.

Following the establishment of professional branches by Turkish football clubs, Sarıyer decided to establish a professional branch in 1956.

Sarıyer Gençlik Kulübü participated in league matches in the Istanbul Local League for the first time in the 1959-60 season and competed in this league for four seasons. Sarıyer won the championship in the 1962-63 season and was promoted to the newly established Turkish Second Football League, finishing seventh in league's first season. After competing in this league for a long time, the club was relegated to the Turkish Third Football League in the 1968-69 season following an unsuccessful season. However, the blue-and-white club did not remain in this league and, despite finishing fifth in its first season, it returned to the Turkish Second Football League as 1970-71 TFF Third League Red Group champions in its second season.

=== Sarıyer Spor Kulübü ===
Sarıyer competed in the Turkish First Football League between 1982 and 1994 and between 1996 and 1997. Particularly in the 1980s, Sarıyer gained significant prominence, backed by a strong squad and robust fan support, frequently being referred to as "Istanbul's fourth major team". This competitive strength was demonstrated by securing three 4th-place finishes—in the 1985–86, 1988–89, and 1990–91 seasons—which regularly positioned the club as a challenger for European qualification spots.

Crucially, this successful period was enabled by strong financial backing that allowed Sarıyer to build highly competitive teams by attracting some of the most prominent players in Turkish football. The roster featured numerous notable players, including Fenerbahçe legend Rıdvan Dilmen, Turkish internationals like Sercan Görgülü, Selçuk Yula, Erdal Keser and the future national team striker Saffet Sancaklı. The club also successfully integrated foreign stars, such as the former league top scorer, Yugoslav striker Tarık Hodžić.

The ultimate highlight of this era was the club's victory in the Balkans Cup during the 1991–92 season. This title, secured by defeating the Romanian side Oțelul Galați, remains the most significant international achievement in Sarıyer's history. Despite this triumph, the long run in the top flight came to an end with the club's relegation in 1994, although they managed a brief, one-season return for 1996–97 before descending again due to the ban on construction activities in Sarıyer, coupled with the withdrawal of financial support from wealthy businesspeople in the region, which led to financial difficulties.

From 2005 to 2025, the club competed in the TFF Second League for 20 consecutive seasons. Although it advanced to the playoffs in the 2014-15 and 2015-16 seasons, it was eliminated in the quarterfinals and failed to advance to the TFF First League.

In the 2018-19 season, Sarıyer competed in the TFF Second League White Group under the management of Serdar Bozkurt. They secured 20 wins, 8 draws, and 6 losses in 34 matches. With 68 points, they finished 5th in their group and qualified for the playoffs. In the playoff quarterfinals, they eliminated Kastamonuspor 1966 with a 1-0 and 1-1 aggregate score over two matches. In the semifinals, they were eliminated by Sakaryaspor with a 0-4 and 0-0 aggregate score over two matches, thus losing their chance to promote to the TFF First League.

The club finished the 2024-25 season as champions of the TFF Second League White Group with 82 points, just two clear of Batman Petrolspor and were promoted to the TFF First League under the management of Mustafa Sarıgül.

On 20 May 2025, chairman Salih Bayraktar announced that he would step down and call for an elective general assembly meeting. In the election held on 14 June 2025, Erdal Aksoy, who previously served as chairman from 1976 to 1990, was elected as the new chairman. However, just four days later, on 19 June 2025, Aksoy also announced that he would step down due to health issues and called for another elective general assembly.

On 13 July 2025, Emre Yaldız was elected as the new president of Sarıyer Spor Kulübü at the extraordinary elective general assembly Meeting.

Sarıyer began the 2025–26 season by appointing Turkish coach Şenol Can in July, who had previously managed Süper Lig sides such as Fatih Karagümrük and Kasımpaşa. However, due to the team's struggling start, Can's contract was terminated after five league matches.

Yılmaz Vural was appointed as the new club manager in September and, in his debut match, experienced a 2–0 home defeat to Pendikspor. The club got its first win in the 2025–26 season against Adana Demirspor under Vural's management, in which Sarıyer won 3–0 away from home. However, following continued poor results, notably a 2–1 home loss to Sakaryaspor, Vural's contract was terminated on 9 October 2025, after only 22 days and four matches in charge.

Servet Çetin was named the head coach of Sarıyer on 15 October 2025, winning against Ümraniyespor 3–1 away in his debut match, he secured the club's second victory in the 2025–26 season. Under Çetin, the team showed signs of improvement both defensively and offensively, gradually moving away from the relegation zone and stabilizing their performances throughout the remainder of the first half of the season. In the winter transfer window, Sarıyer strengthened its squad with several additions. The club signed Aytaç Kara, Marcos Silva, Cebrail Karayel, Caner Osmanpaşa, Ahmet Ekmekci, and Emre Oğuz, while André Poko, Mert Bayram, Enver Kulašin, and Emeka Eze joined on loan. During the second half of the season, Sarıyer improved its league form and managed to secure safety in the second half of the campaign, finishing the season in 12th place, level on points with 11th place İstanbulspor. Çetin resigned from his position as head coach at the end of the season.

At the start of the 2026–27 season, former Sarıyer manager Vural filed a complaint against the club over an outstanding payment. As a result, Sarıyer was initially handed a one-season transfer ban. The sanction was lifted 24 hours later.

On 22 May 2026, Sarıyer appointed Bülent Bölükbaşı as head coach on a one-season contract. The club made several changes to its squad during the summer transfer window, signing players including Efecan Karaca who formerly played for the club back in 2012, Tunahan Ergül, Mamadou Thiam, Joseph Attamah, Emeka Eze, whose loan deal was made permanent, Doğancan Davas and Ibrahim Šehić. The team recorded three wins, one draw and one defeat in its opening five league matches. Following a 2–0 away victory against Pendikspor on 1 September 2026, Sarıyer had collected 10 points and was in second place in the league table after five matches. Following a 4–1 home defeat against Bodrum FK on 13 October 2026, Bölükbaşı and Sarıyer mutually parted ways. On 15 October, the club appointed Umut Eskiköy as his successor. During Bölükbaşı's tenure, the team recorded four wins, three draws and three defeats in ten matches, collecting 15 points. Sarıyer subsequently drew 1–1 away against Sivasspor on 17 October and lost 2–0 at home to Fatih Karagümrük on 24 October. On 27 October, the club defeated Ayvalıkgücü Belediyespor 1–0 in the third round of the Turkish Cup, with Yağız Şen scoring the winning goal.

== Club colours ==
When Sarıyer Gençlik Kulübü operated as an independent club, its primary colours were burgundy and melon orange. The Sarıyer Gençler Mahfili, which was established later, also used these colours. The Sarıyer Gençlik Kulübü, which was established after the activities of the Sarıyer Gençler Mahfili came to an end, also adopted the same colours. In its application to become a federated club, the Sarıyer Gençlik Kulübü specified its colours as burgundy and melon orange. However, the General Directorate of Physical Education at the time registered its colours as navy blue and white. Thus, the navy blue and white colours currently in use were assigned to the Sarıyer Gençlik Kulübü by the General Directorate of Sports Services. The Sarıyer community did not hesitate to adopt the navy blue and white colours registered. The use of the navy blue and white colours and the registration of the attire to be worn were approved by the Istanbul Governorate on 6 December 1945 under permit number 946-11. Subsequently, the permission to use the attire and colours was ratified by the General Directorate of Sports Services on 11 April 1946.

Former logos of Sarıyer (in chronological order from top left to bottom right)

== Club crest ==
The emblem of the Sarıyer Gençlik Kulübü was determined at the same time as the establishment of the club in 1940. After completing the registration process, the General Directorate of Physical Education announced that the clothing to be worn must also be registered. The prepared emblem and the design of the uniforms, along with the colours to be used, were formalised and submitted to the General Directorate of Physical Education.

The emblem was composed of navy blue and white colours. The emblem is white in the form of a cross stripe, and the initials ‘S.G.K.’ of the Sarıyer Gençlik Kulübü are placed on the white stripe with equal weight. This emblem was used as a lapel pin for many years. The founding date, 1940, was added in white on navy blue on the lapel pins, but despite the unchanged navy blue and white colours, the lapel pins underwent changes from time to time.

The emblem of the Sarıyer Gençlik Kulübü was changed in the 1981-82 season without a general assembly decision. In the new emblem, the Sarıyer Gençlik Kulübü was symbolised by two fish forming an ‘S’ shape on a white ellipse. The words ‘Sarıyer Gençlik Kulübü - 1940’ were written around the ellipse.

== Stadium ==
Sarıyer S.K. has primarily utilized two stadiums throughout its history:

=== Yusuf Ziya Öniş Stadium ===
Located in Sarıyer, Istanbul, Yusuf Ziya Öniş Stadium has been Sarıyer’s home ground since its opening in 1988. The stadium has a seating capacity of around 4,100 and features a natural grass pitch. It has undergone several renovations to improve facilities and accommodate fans.

=== Çayırbaşı Stadium ===
Situated in the Çayırbaşı neighborhood of Sarıyer, this stadium has a capacity of 2,825 with an artificial turf surface. While primarily used by local teams such as Kireçburnu SK and Yeniköyspor, it has not been the main venue for Sarıyer.

== League attendances ==
- Turkish Super League: 1982–94, 1996–97
- TFF First League: 1963–69, 1971–82, 1994–96, 1997–01, 2004–05, 2025–
- TFF Second League: 1969–71, 2001–04, 2005–2025

== Honours ==
- TFF First League
  - Winners (1): 1981-82
- TFF Second League
  - Winners (2): 2003-04, 2024-25
- TFF Third League
  - Winners (1): 1970-71
- Balkans Cup
  - Winners (1): 1991–92

== Club records ==
| Most capped players | | | | Top goalscorers | | | | |
| | Player | Matches | Seasons | | Player | Goals | Matches | Seasons |
|---|---|---|---|---|---|---|---|---|
| 1 | Cengiz Güzeltepe | 288 | 1987-1998 | 1 | Sercan Görgülü | 77 | 274 | 1985-1995 |
| 2 | Sercan Görgülü | 274 | 1985-1995 | 2 | Sead Celebic | 53 | 150 | 1982-1987 |
| 3 | Esat Bayram | 264 | 1988-1997 | 3 | Erdi Demir | 42 | 137 | 1990-1995 |
| 4 | Osman Yıldırım | 240 | 1984-1995 | 4 | Cemre Atmaca | 37 | 116 | 2011-2016 |
| 5 | Engin Ülker | 230 | 1982-1995 | 5 | Selçuk Yula | 36 | 85 | 1987-1991 |
| 6 | Hakan Özgerçek | 219 | 1981-1991 | 6 | Ertan Koç | 35 | 67 | 2007-2009 |
| 7 | Mehmet Kaplan | 207 | 1987-1996 | 7 | Sinan Pektemek | 33 | 120 | 2009-2014 |
| 8 | Ethem Baykurt | 189 | 2005-2013 | 8 | Erdal Keser | 32 | 66 | 1987-1989 |
| 9 | Erdem Acar | 184 | 1975-1988 | 9 | Rıdvan Dilmen | 31 | 127 | 1983-1987 |
| 10 | Feridun Alkan | 177 | 1988-1995 | 10 | Osman Yıldırım | 31 | 240 | 1984-1995 |

== European participations ==
As of 14 April 1992

Statistics:

| Competition | Pld | W | D | L | GF | GA | GD |
|---|---|---|---|---|---|---|---|
| Balkans Cup | 6 | 3 | 2 | 1 | 9 | 4 | +5 |
| Total | 6 | 3 | 2 | 1 | 9 | 4 | +5 |

Pld = Matches played; W = Matches won; D = Matches drawn; L = Matches lost; GF = Goals for; GA = Goals against; GD = Goal Difference.

Balkans Cup:

| Season | Round | Club | Home | Away | Aggregate | Ref |
|---|---|---|---|---|---|---|
| 1991-92 | Quarter-finals | (Bulgaria) Hebar Pazardzhik | 2–0 | 1–1 | 3–1 | |
| 1991-92 | Semi-finals | (Greece) Ethnikos Piraeus | 0–3 | 5–0 | 5–3 | |
| 1991-92 | Finals | (Romania) Oțelul Galați | 1–0 | 0–0 | 1–0 | |

== Current squad ==
As of 14 November 2026

Note: Flags indicate national team as defined under FIFA eligibility rules; some limited exceptions apply. Players may hold more than one non-FIFA nationality.

| No. | Pos. | Nation | Player |
|---|---|---|---|
| 1 | GK | TUR | Furkan Onur Akyüz |
| 3 | DF | GHA | Joseph Larweh Attamah |
| 4 | DF | TUR | Erdi Dikmen |
| 5 | DF | TUR | Eşref Korkmazoğlu |
| 7 | FW | TUR | Barış Alıcı |
| 8 | MF | ANG | Marcos Silva |
| 9 | FW | TUR | Batuhan Kör |
| 10 | FW | TUR | Efecan Karaca |
| 11 | FW | TUR | Eren Karadağ (on loan from Çorum) |
| 13 | GK | BIH | Ibrahim Šehić |
| 14 | MF | TUR | Tunahan Ergül |
| 17 | MF | TUR | Doğan Can Davas |
| 19 | MF | TUR | Yağız Şen (on loan from Fenerbahçe) |
| 21 | FW | GER | Berke Sanlitürk |
| 23 | DF | TUR | Üzeyir Ergün |

| No. | Pos. | Nation | Player |
|---|---|---|---|
| 24 | DF | TUR | Işık Kaan Arslan |
| 27 | MF | TUR | Mahmut Celal Yücel |
| 28 | MF | TUR | Hasan Emre Yeşilyurt (on loan from Çorum) |
| 35 | DF | TUR | Hasan Berat Kayalı |
| 41 | MF | TUR | Furkan Gedik |
| 53 | MF | GAB | André Biyogo Poko |
| 61 | MF | TUR | Emirhan Özkan |
| 77 | DF | TUR | Cebrail Karayel |
| 88 | DF | TUR | Caner Osmanpaşa |
| 90 | FW | NGR | Emeka Eze |
| 91 | GK | TUR | Ahmet Göcen |
| 93 | FW | SEN | Mamadou Thiam |
| 99 | FW | CIV | Stann Élysée Dalo (on loan from Kasımpaşa) |
| — | MF | TUR | İsmail Korkut |

=== Other players under contract ===
Note: Flags indicate national team as defined under FIFA eligibility rules; some limited exceptions apply. Players may hold more than one non-FIFA nationality.

| No. | Pos. | Nation | Player |
|---|---|---|---|
| — | MF | TUR | Efe Terzi |

=== Out on loan ===
Note: Flags indicate national team as defined under FIFA eligibility rules; some limited exceptions apply. Players may hold more than one non-FIFA nationality.

| No. | Pos. | Nation | Player |
|---|---|---|---|
| — | DF | TUR | Furkan Metin (at Boluspor until 30 June 2027) |
| — | DF | TUR | Emre Oğuz (at İnegölspor until 30 June 2027) |

| No. | Pos. | Nation | Player |
|---|---|---|---|
| — | MF | TUR | Furkan Yöntem (at Aliağa FK until 30 June 2027) |
