= 2022–23 İstanbulspor season =

İstanbulspor
2022–23 season
- Manager: Osman Zeki Korkmaz (until 24 October); Fatih Tekke (from 25 October)
- Stadium: Esenyurt Necmi Kadıoğlu Stadium
- Süper Lig: 12th
- Turkish Cup: Fifth round
- Top goalscorer: League: Valon Ethemi (12); All: Valon Ethemi (12)
Home colours	Away colours	Third colours

The 2022–23 season was the 110th season in the existence of İstanbulspor and the club's first season back in the top flight of Turkish football. In addition to the domestic league, İstanbulspor participated in this season's edition of the Turkish Cup. The season covers the period from 1 July 2022 to 30 June 2023.

== Players ==
=== First-team squad ===
As of 5 March 2023

Note: Flags indicate national team as defined under FIFA eligibility rules; some limited exceptions apply. Players may hold more than one non-FIFA nationality.

No.	Pos.	Nation	Player
1	GK	DEN	David Jensen
2	DF	BIH	Denis Kovačević
3	DF	TUR	Duhan Aksu
4	DF	TUR	Mehmet Yeşil
5	MF	TUR	Eslem Öztürk
10	MF	ALB	Eduard Rroca
12	MF	MLI	Mahamadou Ba (on loan from Adana Demirspor)
13	DF	TUR	Oğuzhan Berber
14	FW	GHA	Raymond Owusu
18	MF	TUR	Vefa Temel
19	FW	TUR	Emir Kaan Gültekin
21	DF	ENG	Demeaco Duhaney (on loan from Stoke City)
23	DF	GER	Okan Erdoğan
24	MF	TUR	Muammer Sarıkaya
26	GK	TUR	Mücahit Serbest
27	MF	MKD	Valon Ethemi
34	MF	KOS	Florian Loshaj

No.	Pos.	Nation	Player
44	FW	TUR	Yusuf Özer
50	DF	NGR	Michael Ologo
59	GK	TUR	Alp Arda
61	FW	ALB	Sindrit Guri
66	DF	BEL	Ali Yaşar
70	FW	COD	Jason Lokilo (on loan from Sparta Rotterdam)
88	DF	BIH	Adi Mehremić
90	FW	NGR	Emeka Friday Eze (on loan from Eyüpspor)
98	FW	KOS	Jetmir Topalli
—	GK	TUR	Ahmet Kivanç (on loan from Adanaspor)
—	DF	CIV	Simon Deli (on loan from Adana Demirspor)
—	DF	TUR	Ertuğrul Ersoy (on loan from Gaziantep)
—	MF	TUR	Onur Ergün (on loan from Hatayspor)
—	MF	TUR	Kerem Şen (on loan from Trabzonspor)
—	FW	TUR	Mirza Cihan (on loan from Gaziantep)
—	FW	KOS	Valmir Veliu (on loan from Gaziantep)

=== Out on loan ===
Note: Flags indicate national team as defined under FIFA eligibility rules; some limited exceptions apply. Players may hold more than one non-FIFA nationality.

No.	Pos.	Nation	Player
—	GK	TUR	Yiğit Yitmez (at Ankara Demirspor until 30 June 2023)
—	DF	TUR	Arda Belen (at Sivas Belediyespor until 30 June 2023)
—	DF	TUR	Alperen Çaylak (at Karaköprü Belediyespor until 30 June 2023)
—	DF	TUR	Abdurrahman Emek (at Yeni Mersin İdmanyurdu until 30 June 2023)
—	DF	TUR	Fatih Tultak (at Ergene Velimeşe until 30 June 2023)
—	MF	TUR	Abdullah Dıjlan Aydın (at Karacabey Belediyespor until 30 June 2023)
—	MF	TUR	Berkay Görmez (at Sarıyer until 30 June 2023)
—	MF	TUR	Ahmet Can Özer (at Büyükçekmece Tepecikspor until 30 June 2023)
—	MF	TUR	Erdem Seçgin (at Isparta 32 SK until 30 June 2023)
—	MF	TUR	Cafer Tosun (at Elazığspor until 30 June 2023)

No.	Pos.	Nation	Player
—	FW	TUR	Kağan Bağış (at Yeni Mersin İdmanyurdu until 30 June 2023)
—	FW	TUR	Muhammed Enes Durmuş (at Kastamonuspor 1966 until 30 June 2023)
—	FW	TUR	Görkem Güven (at Bulvarspor until 30 June 2023)
—	FW	TUR	Berk Ali Nizam (at Beyoğlu Yeni Çarşı until 30 June 2023)
—	FW	TUR	Tolga Şahin (at Arnavutköy Belediyespor until 30 June 2023)
—	FW	TUR	Mustafa Sol (at Çatalcaspor until 30 June 2023)
—	FW	TUR	Yusuf Tunç (at 52 Orduspor until 30 June 2023)
—	FW	TUR	Esen Yılanlı (at Büyükçekmece Tepecikspor until 30 June 2023)
—	FW	TUR	İbrahim Yılmaz (at Eyüpspor until 30 June 2023)
—	FW	TUR	Hakan Yılmaz (at Vanspor until 30 June 2023)

== Pre-season and friendlies ==
Win Draw Loss Fixtures

13 July 2022 Friendly	İstanbulspor (Turkey)	0–1	(Turkey) Sakaryaspor	Bolu
17:00 TRT (UTC+3)			Kasongo 55'	Stadium: Vonresort Hotel Futbol Sahası

26 July 2022 Friendly	İstanbulspor (Turkey)	1–1	(Iran) Sepahan	Istanbul
19:00 TRT (UTC+3)	Gültekin 15'		Moghanlou 78' (pen.)	Stadium: Esenyurt Necmi Kadıoğlu Stadium

29 July 2022 Friendly	İstanbulspor (Turkey)	1–0	(Albania) Kukësi	Istanbul
19:00 TRT (UTC+3)	Yılmaz 20'			Stadium: Esenyurt Necmi Kadıoğlu Stadium

24 September 2022 Friendly	Galatasaray (Turkey)	2–1	(Turkey) İstanbulspor	Istanbul
19:00 TRT (UTC+3)	Yılmaz 12'; Icardi 65' (pen.)		Mehremić 30'	Stadium: Nef Stadium

6 December 2022 Friendly	Kasımpaşa (Turkey)	3–1	(Turkey) İstanbulspor	Istanbul
13:30 TRT (UTC+3)	Bahoken 43'; Kara 60'; Fall 74'		Ethemi 45'	Stadium: Kasımpaşaspor Kemerburgaz Tesisleri

4 March 2023 Friendly	İstanbulspor (Turkey)	0–6	(Turkey) Galatasaray	Istanbul
17:00 TRT (UTC+3)			Rashica 8'; Oliveira 19'; Gomis 40'; Bayram 55'; Zaniolo 84'; Dubois 88'	Stadium: Esenyurt Necmi Kadıoğlu Stadium; Referee: Ozan Ergün

== Competitions ==
=== Overall record ===
Competition	First match	Last match	Starting round	Final position	Record							
Competition	First match	Last match	Starting round	Final position	Pld	W	D	L	GF	GA	GD	Win %
Süper Lig	5 August 2022	7 June 2023	Matchday 1	12th	36	12	5	19	47	63	−16	33.33
Turkish Cup	10 November 2022	20 December 2022	Fourth round	Fifth round	2	1	0	1	4	5	−1	50.00
Total					38	13	5	20	51	68	−17	34.21

Source: Soccerway

=== Süper Lig ===
==== League table ====
Pos	Team	Pld	W	D	L	GF	GA	GD	Pts
10	Kasımpaşa	36	12	7	17	45	61	−16	43
11	Ankaragücü	36	12	6	18	43	53	−10	42
12	İstanbulspor	36	12	5	19	47	63	−16	41 (Note: Head-to-head points: İstanbulspor 11, Antalyaspor 10, Sivasspor 8, Alanyaspor 4.)
13	Antalyaspor	36	11	8	17	46	55	−9	41
14	Sivasspor	36	11	8	17	46	54	−8	41

Source: Süper Lig
Rules for classification: 1) Points; 2) Head-to-head points; 3) Head-to-head goal difference; 4) Head-to-head goals scored; 5) Goal difference; 6) Goals scored; 7) Play-off.

==== Results summary ====
Overall								Home						Away					
Pld	W	D	L	GF	GA	GD	Pts	W	D	L	GF	GA	GD	W	D	L	GF	GA	GD
36	12	5	19	47	63	−16	41	7	3	8	27	29	−2	5	2	11	20	34	−14

Source: Spor Toto Süper Lig

==== Results by round ====
Round	1	2	3	4	5	6	7	8	9	10	11	12	13	14	15	16	17	18	19	20	21	22	23	24	25	26	27	28	29	30	31	32	33	34	35	36	37	38
Ground	H	A	H	A		A	H	A	H	A	A	H	A	H	A	H	A	H	A	A	H	A	H		H	A	H	A	H	H	A	H	A	H	A	H	A	H
Result	L	L	L	W	B	D	D	W	L	L	L	L	L	L	L	W	L	D	W	L	L	W	W	B	W	L	L	L	W	D	D	W	W	L	L	L	W	W
Position	18	18	18	14	16	16	15	13	13	15	18	18	18	18	18	18	19	19	18	18	18	18	18	18	16	16	17	17	16	15	15	15	14	15	15	15	15	12

Source: Spor Toto Süper Lig
A = Away; H = Home; B = Bye; W = Win; D = Draw; L = Loss

==== Matches ====
The league schedule was released on 4 July.

5 August 2022 1	İstanbulspor	0–2	Trabzonspor	Istanbul
21:00 TRT (UTC+3)	Yazgan (yellow card) 45'; Aksu (yellow card) 82'	Report	Cornelius 16'; Trézéguet (yellow card) 49'; Siopis (yellow card) 74'; Denswil 86'	Stadium: Atatürk Olympic Stadium; Attendance: 7,126; Referee: Arda Kardeşler

13 August 2022 2	Kayserispor	1–0	İstanbulspor	Kayseri
19:15 TRT (UTC+3)	Cardoso 4' (yellow card) 32'; Bertolacci (yellow card) 52'; Ackah (yellow card) 87'	Report	Yaşar (yellow card) 49'; Aksu (yellow card) 76'	Stadium: Kadir Has Stadium; Attendance: 6,776; Referee: Suat Arslanboğa

22 August 2022 3	İstanbulspor	0–4	Konyaspor	Istanbul
19:15 TRT (UTC+3)	Ologo (yellow card) 68'	Report	Çekiçi 29'; Demirbağ (yellow card) 40'; Demir 44' (pen.); Oğuz (yellow card) 45+1'; Hadžiahmetović (yellow card) 55'; Yeşil 56' (o.g.); Guilherme 69' (pen.)	Stadium: Necmi Kadıoğlu Stadium; Attendance: 373; Referee: Burak Şeker

27 August 2022 4	Alanyaspor	0–1	İstanbulspor	Antalya
21:45 TRT (UTC+3)	Fer (yellow card) 47'; Candeias (yellow card) 67' (penalty missed) 87'; Bayır (yellow card) 79'	Report	Ethemi 48' (yellow card) 76'; Yılmaz (yellow card) 71'; Abazaj (yellow card) 86' (yellow card) 87' (red card)	Stadium: Kırbıyık Holding Stadium; Attendance: 2,505; Referee: Mustafa Kürşad Filiz

5	Bye

11 September 2022 6	Sivasspor	1–1	İstanbulspor	Sivas
17:00 TRT (UTC+3)	Ulvestad (yellow card) 16' (goal) 80'; Yalçın (yellow card) 75'	Report	Ethemi 64' (yellow card) 75'; Topalli (yellow card) 69'; Kabasakal (yellow card) 79'	Stadium: New Sivas 4 Eylül Stadium; Attendance: 3,099; Referee: Hüseyin Göçek

17 September 2022 7	İstanbulspor	2–2	Beşiktaş	Istanbul
20:00 TRT (UTC+3)	Destanoğlu 26' (o.g.); Kabasakal (yellow card) 45+4'; Yaşar 86'	Report	Nkoudou 8'; Souza (yellow card) 30'; Weghorst 39'; Welinton (yellow card) 84'	Stadium: Atatürk Olympic Stadium; Attendance: 3,613; Referee: Zorbay Küçük

3 October 2022 8	Fatih Karagümrük	1–2	İstanbulspor	Istanbul
20:00 TRT (UTC+3)	Diagne 37' (yellow card) 89'; Viviano (yellow card) 84'	Report	Gültekin (yellow card) 45+3'; Rroca 69' (yellow card) 89'; Topalli 74'	Stadium: Atatürk Olympic Stadium; Attendance: 353; Referee: Ali Şansalan

8 October 2022 9	İstanbulspor	1–2	Ankaragücü	Istanbul
14:30 TRT (UTC+3)	Sarıkaya (yellow card) 14'; Ethemi (yellow card) 29' (goal) 55'	Report	Kılınç 16'; Pêpê (yellow card) 80'; Güreler (yellow card) 87'; Sowe 90+2'	Stadium: Necmi Kadıoğlu Stadium; Attendance: 444; Referee: Yasin Kol

16 October 2022 10	İstanbul Başakşehir	2–0	İstanbulspor	Istanbul
17:00 TRT (UTC+3)	Ndayishimiye 26', 78' (yellow card) 82'; Biglia (yellow card) 44'; Türüç (yellow card) 74'; Caiçara (yellow card) 90+1'	Report	Yeşil (yellow card) 35'	Stadium: Fatih Terim Stadium; Attendance: 1,302; Referee: Erkan Özdamar

21 October 2022 11	Antalyaspor	2–1	İstanbulspor	Antalya
20:00 TRT (UTC+3)	Haji Wright (yellow card) 33'; Fernando 45+2'; Sam Larsson (yellow card) 64'; Hüsam Gaşa (yellow card) 68'; Veysel Sarı 90+7'	Report	Mehremić 26'; Yeşil (yellow card) 45'; Rroca (yellow card) 50' (yellow card) 61' (red card); Jensen (yellow card) 71'; Erdoğan (yellow card) 89'; Sarıkaya (yellow card) 90+5'	Stadium: Antalya Stadium; Attendance: 7,735; Referee: Ümit Öztürk

30 October 2022 12	İstanbulspor	2–5	Fenerbahçe	Istanbul
20:00 TRT (UTC+3)	Topalli 48', 67'; Ebert (yellow card) 77'	Report	Batshuayi 18' (pen.), 49', 88'; Kahveci 36'; Aziz (yellow card) 64'; Valencia 86'	Stadium: Atatürk Olympic Stadium; Attendance: 15,871; Referee: Mustafa Kürşad Filiz

5 November 2022 13	Giresunspor	3–2	İstanbulspor	Giresun
14:30 TRT (UTC+3)	Uludağ 45+2'; Campuzano 48'; Mejía 56'; Piri (yellow card) 87'	Report	Adi Mehremić (yellow card) 11'; Yılmaz (yellow card) 14'; Ethemi 18'; Yeşil (yellow card) 77'; Topalli 87'; Berber (yellow card) 90+2'	Stadium: Çotanak Sports Complex; Attendance: 3,035; Referee: Sarper Barış Saka

13 November 2022 14	İstanbulspor	0–1	Hatayspor	Istanbul
17:00 TRT (UTC+3)	Rroca (yellow card) 23'; Ologo (yellow card) 76'; Ebert (yellow card) 88'	Report	El Kaabi 24' (pen.) (yellow card) 42'; Ergün (yellow card) 69'; Kanak (yellow card) 72'; Aabid (yellow card) 79'; Boudjemaa (yellow card) 90+1'	Stadium: Necmi Kadıoğlu Stadium; Attendance: 786; Referee: Mert Güzenge

25 December 2022 15	Galatasaray	2–1	İstanbulspor	Istanbul
19:00 TRT (UTC+3)	Gomis 15', 37'; Karataş (yellow card) 50'; Mertens (yellow card) 57'; Bardakcı (yellow card) 81'; Torreira (yellow card) 88'	Report	Aksu (yellow card) 31'; Rroca (yellow card) 69'; Yeşil 82'	Stadium: Nef Stadium; Attendance: 40,499; Referee: Abdulkadir Bitigen

28 December 2022 16	İstanbulspor	2–1	Kasımpaşa	Istanbul
17:00 TRT (UTC+3)	Ethemi 29'; Yılmaz (yellow card) 49'; Sarıkaya (yellow card) 63'; Gültekin 78'	Report	Petretta 25' (yellow card) 62'; Tırpan (yellow card) 38'; Serbest (yellow card) 49'; Bruma (yellow card) 51'	Stadium: Necmi Kadıoğlu Stadium; Attendance: 295; Referee: Suat Arslanboğa

5 January 2023 17	Adana Demirspor	6–0	İstanbulspor	Adana
20:00 TRT (UTC+3)	Belhanda 29' (pen.) (yellow card) 43'; Sarı 49'; Onyekuru 55', 79'; Ndiaye 65' (pen.); Töre 82'	Report	Erdoğan (yellow card) 26'; Jensen (yellow card) 65'; Rroca (yellow card) 83'	Stadium: New Adana Stadium; Attendance: 8,992; Referee: Mete Kalkavan

9 January 2023 18	İstanbulspor	1–1	Gaziantep	Istanbul
20:00 TRT (UTC+3)	Yılmaz (yellow card) 87'; Ethemi 90+10' (pen.)	Report	Jevtović 38'; Eskihellaç (yellow card) 90+10'	Stadium: Necmi Kadıoğlu Stadium; Attendance: 396; Referee: Burak Şeker

15 January 2023 19	Ümraniyespor	0–2	İstanbulspor	Istanbul
13:30 TRT (UTC+3)	Yılmaz (yellow card) 42'; Popov (yellow card) 45+4'	Report	Eze (yellow card) 5'; Topalli (yellow card) 12'; Rroca (yellow card) 28'; Ethemi 30'; Kabasakal 45+4'; Jensen (yellow card) 84'	Stadium: Ümraniye Municipality City Stadium; Attendance: 1,399; Referee: Ali Palabıyık

22 January 2023 20	Trabzonspor	4–0	İstanbulspor	Trabzon
19:00 TRT (UTC+3)	Yazıcı 33' (yellow card) 53'; Bartra 49'; Bakasetas 51'; Trézéguet 64'	Report		Stadium: Şenol Güneş Sports Complex; Attendance: 27,445; Referee: Arda Kardeşler

29 January 2023 21	İstanbulspor	2–4	Kayserispor	Istanbul
13:30 TRT (UTC+3)	Lokilo 10'; Ethemi 32'	Report	Carlos Mané 18'; Bulut 52'; Kemen (yellow card) 65'; Başsan 83'; Parlak 89'	Stadium: Necmi Kadıoğlu Stadium; Attendance: 810; Referee: Murat Erdoğan

2 February 2023 22	Konyaspor	0–1	İstanbulspor	Konya
17:00 TRT (UTC+3)	Paz (yellow card) 2'; Michalak (yellow card) 90+8'	Report	Eze (yellow card) 4'; Karayel 67' (o.g.); Erdoğan (yellow card) 85'; Duhaney (yellow card) 90+6'	Stadium: Konya Metropolitan Municipality Stadium; Referee: Ümit Öztürk

5 February 2023 23	İstanbulspor	2–1	Alanyaspor	Istanbul
13:30 TRT (UTC+3)	Rroca (yellow card) 28'; Ethemi 67'; Gültekin 77'	Report	Cavaleiro 71'	Stadium: Necmi Kadıoğlu Stadium; Referee: Abdulkadir Bitigen

24	Bye

13 March 2023 25	İstanbulspor	3–0	Sivasspor	Istanbul
20:00 TRT (UTC+3)	Ethemi 7' (pen.); Ba (yellow card) 53'; Duhaney 59'; Lokilo (yellow card) 66' (goal) 88'	Report	Camara (yellow card) 35'; Gradel (yellow card) 80' (yellow-red card) 80'; Sáiz (yellow card) 90+4'	Stadium: Necmi Kadıoğlu Stadium; Referee: Halil Umut Meler

18 March 2023 26	Beşiktaş	3–1	İstanbulspor	Istanbul
19:00 TRT (UTC+3)	Tosun 42'; Aboubakar 56'; Redmond 90+3'	Report	Aksu (yellow card) 45+2'; Lokilo 70'; Duhaney (yellow card) 77'	Stadium: Vodafone Park; Referee: Ali Şansalan

3 April 2023 27	İstanbulspor	0–1	Fatih Karagümrük	Istanbul
20:30 TRT (UTC+3)	Gültekin (yellow card) 30'; Losha (yellow card) 50'; Lokilo (yellow card) 58'; Eze (yellow card) 75'; Yaşar (yellow card) 80'	Report	Diagne 27'; Ricci (yellow card) 44'; Biraschi (yellow card) 90+1' (yellow-red card) 90+4'	Stadium: Necmi Kadıoğlu Stadium; Referee: Atilla Karaoğlan

8 April 2023 28	Ankaragücü	3–2	İstanbulspor	Ankara
16:00 TRT (UTC+3)	Sowe 10', 53'; Diack 24'; Antalyalı (yellow card) 84'	Report	Ethemi (yellow card) 28'; Şen 47'; Sarıkaya (yellow card) 51'; Lokilo 55'; Yeşil (yellow card) 74'; Ba (yellow card) 77'	Stadium: Eryaman Stadium; Referee: Mustafa Kürşad Filiz

15 April 2023 29	İstanbulspor	1–0	İstanbul Başakşehir	Istanbul
16:00 TRT (UTC+3)	Duhaney (yellow card) 24'; Eze 45+7'; Ba (yellow card) 90+5'	Report	Biglia (yellow card) 38'; Gürler (yellow card) 45+6'; Tekdemir (yellow card) 71'; Figueiredo (yellow card) 90'; Erkin (yellow card) 90+3'; Şahiner (yellow card) 90+5'	Stadium: Necmi Kadıoğlu Stadium; Referee: Mert Güzenge

19 April 2023 30	İstanbulspor	3–3	Antalyaspor	Istanbul
17:00 TRT (UTC+3)	Rroca 6'; Lokilo (yellow card) 31'; Ba 45', (yellow card) 63'; Ethemi (yellow card) 47'; Ergün 55', (yellow card) 90'; Aksu (yellow card) 74'; Duhaney (yellow card) 84'; Jensen (yellow card) 87'; Deli (yellow card) 90+9'	Report	Fernando 42'; Wright 51', 88' (pen.); Fredy (yellow card) 79'	Stadium: Necmi Kadıoğlu Stadium; Referee: Yiğit Arslan

24 April 2023 31	Fenerbahçe	3–3	İstanbulspor	Istanbul
20:00 TRT (UTC+3)	Güler 25', 51'; Mor (yellow card) 44'; Akayin (yellow card) 45+2'; Kadıoğlu (yellow card) 55'; João Pedro 71'	Report	Erdoğan (yellow card) 44'; Ethemi 57' (pen.), 66'; Ersoy (yellow card) 86'; Sarıkaya (yellow card) 90+3'; Eze 90+6'	Stadium: Şükrü Saracoğlu Stadium; Referee: Kadir Sağlam

1 May 2023 32	İstanbulspor	1–0	Giresunspor	Istanbul
20:00 TRT (UTC+3)	Eze 10'; Deli (red card) 49'; Ergün (yellow card) 51'; Topalli (yellow card) 88'; Erdoğan (yellow card) 90+1'	Report	Bajić (penalty missed) 17'; Bilazer (yellow card) 52'; Sainz (yellow card) 90+1'	Stadium: Necmi Kadıoğlu Stadium; Referee: Mete Kalkavan

33	Hatayspor	0–3 (w/o)	İstanbulspor	Hatay
		Report		Stadium: New Hatay Stadium

16 May 2023 34	İstanbulspor	0–2	Galatasaray	Istanbul
20:00 TRT (UTC+3)	Rroca (yellow card) 41'; Aksu (yellow card) 45+9'; Erdoğan (yellow card) 83'	Report	Icardi 45+11' (pen.), 89'; Midtsjø (yellow card) 71'; Zaniolo (red card) 75'	Stadium: Recep Tayyip Erdoğan Stadium; Referee: Tugay Kaan Numanoğlu

20 May 2023 35	Kasımpaşa	1–0	İstanbulspor	Istanbul
16:00 TRT (UTC+3)	Özcan (yellow card) 48', (goal) 58'; Fall (yellow card) 65'	Report	Duhaney (yellow card) 90+2'	Stadium: Recep Tayyip Erdoğan Stadium; Referee: Yaşar Kemal Uğurlu

30 May 2023 36	İstanbulspor	0–2	Adana Demirspor	Istanbul
20:00 TRT (UTC+3)	Sarıkaya (yellow card) 77'	Report	Akbaba 35', (yellow card) 43'; Gulbrandsen 90'	Stadium: Necmi Kadıoğlu Stadium; Referee: Ümit Öztürk

37	Gaziantep	0–3 (w/o)	İstanbulspor	Gaziantep
		Report		Stadium: Gaziantep Stadium

7 June 2023 38	İstanbulspor	4–0	Ümraniyespor	Istanbul
20:00 TRT (UTC+3)	Topalli 45'; Rroca 61', (yellow card) 89'; Ergün (yellow card) 89'; Sarıkaya 90+4', (yellow card) 90+6'; Eze 90+7'	Report	Şanlıtürk (yellow card) 72'	Stadium: Necmi Kadıoğlu Stadium; Referee: Cihan Aydın

=== Turkish Cup ===
10 November 2022 Fourth round	İstanbulspor	3–2 (a.e.t.)	Etimesgut Belediyespor	Istanbul
13:00 TRT (UTC+3)	Aksu (yellow card) 69'; Topalli 71' (yellow card) 87'; Eduart Rroca 75'; Ologo (yellow card) 114'; Yeşil 118'	Report	Polat 1' (yellow card) 69'; Kınalı 10'; Yıkılmaz (yellow card) 53'; Bolat (yellow card) 93'	Stadium: Necmi Kadıoğlu Stadium; Referee: Murat Erdoğan

20 December 2022 Fifth round	Fenerbahçe	3–1	İstanbulspor	Istanbul
21:00 TRT (UTC+3)	King 31'; Batshuayi 34', 54'	Report	Kabasakal (yellow card) 60'; Rroca (yellow card) 73'; Erdoğan (yellow card) 82'; Topalli 90+3'	Stadium: Şükrü Saracoğlu Stadium; Referee: Volkan Bayarslan
