= 2023–24 İstanbulspor season =

İstanbulspor
2023–24 season
- Manager: Fatih Tekke (until 25 September); Olcay Demir (from 26 September to 10 October); Hakan Yakin (from 16 October to 19 January); Osman Zeki Korkmaz (from 19 January)
- Stadium: Esenyurt Necmi Kadıoğlu Stadium
- Süper Lig: 20th (relegated)
- Turkish Cup: Third round
- Top goalscorer: League: Florian Loshaj (5); All: Florian Loshaj (5)

The 2023–24 season was İstanbulspor's 98th season in existence and second consecutive in the Süper Lig. They also competed in the Turkish Cup.

== Players ==
=== First-team squad ===
As of 1 September 2023

Note: Flags indicate national team as defined under FIFA eligibility rules; some limited exceptions apply. Players may hold more than one non-FIFA nationality.

No.	Pos.	Nation	Player
1	GK	DEN	David Jensen
4	DF	TUR	Mehmet Yeşil
5	MF	TUR	Eslem Öztürk
6	MF	LTU	Modestas Vorobjovas
7	MF	GAB	David Sambissa
8	MF	TUR	Vefa Temel
9	FW	TUR	İbrahim Yılmaz
10	MF	ALB	Eduard Rroca
11	MF	TUR	Kubilay Köylü
12	MF	SEN	Mendy Mamadou
13	DF	SEN	Racine Coly
15	MF	TUR	Berkay Tekke
17	MF	TUR	Enver Azmi Sarıalioğlu
18	FW	SEN	Alassane Ndao
19	FW	TUR	Emir Kaan Gültekin
21	DF	ENG	Demeaco Duhaney
23	DF	GER	Okan Erdoğan

No.	Pos.	Nation	Player
24	MF	TUR	Muammer Sarıkaya
26	GK	TUR	Mücahit Serbest
27	MF	MKD	Valon Ethemi
33	GK	TUR	Emin Yakup Oktay
34	MF	KOS	Florian Loshaj
41	MF	TUR	Tunahan Şamdanlı
59	GK	TUR	Alp Arda
66	DF	BEL	Ali Yaşar
99	FW	BRA	Jackson
—	MF	COD	Giannelli Imbula
—	DF	CIV	Simon Deli
—	FW	TUR	Mustafa Sol
—	MF	TUR	İzzet Topatar
—	FW	CIV	Djakaridja Junior Traoré
—	FW	TUR	Özcan Şahan
—	DF	TUR	Bartu Kırtaş

=== Other players with contract ===
Note: Flags indicate national team as defined under FIFA eligibility rules; some limited exceptions apply. Players may hold more than one non-FIFA nationality.

No.	Pos.	Nation	Player
—	MF	TUR	Egehan Gök
—	MF	TUR	Kağan Bağış

=== Out on loan ===
Note: Flags indicate national team as defined under FIFA eligibility rules; some limited exceptions apply. Players may hold more than one non-FIFA nationality.

No.	Pos.	Nation	Player
—	DF	NGR	Michael Ologo (at Çorum F.K. until 30 June 2024)
—	MF	TUR	Abdullah Dıjlan Aydın (at Amed S.F.K. until 30 June 2024)
—	FW	TUR	Muhammed Enes Durmuş (at Amed S.F.K. until 30 June 2024)
—	DF	TUR	Alperen Mehmet Çaylak (at Büyükçekmece Tepecikspor until 30 June 2024)
—	MF	TUR	Berk Ali Nizam (at Beyoğlu Yeni Çarşı FK until 30 June 2024)

No.	Pos.	Nation	Player
—	MF	TUR	Berkay Görmez (at Aliağa F.K. until 30 June 2024)
—	FW	TUR	Yusuf Özer (at Beyoğlu Yeni Çarşı FK until 30 June 2024)
—	MF	TUR	Ahmet Can Özer (at Artvin Hopaspor until 30 June 2024)
—	MF	TUR	Erdem Secgin (at Vanspor FK until 30 June 2024)
—	MF	KOS	Jetmir Topalli (at Manisa FK until 30 June 2024)

== Transfers ==
=== In ===
Pos.	Player	Transferred from	Fee	Date	Source
MF	(Brazil) Jackson	(Albania) KF Egnatia	€400,000	10 July 2023	
MF	(Senegal) Alassane Ndao	(Saudi Arabia) Al-Ahli	Free	2 August 2023	
DF	(Ivory Coast) Simon Deli	Unattached	Free	23 August 2023	
DF	(Greece) Apostolos Diamantis	(Greece) OFI	Free	1 September 2023	

=== Out ===
Pos.	Player	Transferred to	Fee	Date	Source
DF	(Greece) Apostolos Diamantis	(Romania) FC U Craiova	Free	1 September 2023	
GK	(Denmark) David Jensen	(Denmark) Lyngby BK	Free	3 January 2024	
MF	(Senegal) Alassane Ndao	(Turkey) Konyaspor	€150,000	26 January 2024	

== Pre-season and friendlies ==
Win Draw Loss

13 July 2023 Friendly	Sivasspor (Turkey)	3–0	(Turkey) İstanbulspor	Sivas
16:15 UTC+3	Başsan 7'; Njié 17'; Kaya 83'			Stadium: Vali Lütfullah Bilgin Tesisleri

17 July 2023 Friendly	İstanbulspor (Turkey)	1–2	(Turkey) Gençlerbirliği
--:-- UTC+3

22 November 2023 Friendly	Beşiktaş (Turkey)	Cancelled	(Turkey) İstanbulspor
--:-- UTC+3

6 April 2024 Friendly	Beşiktaş (Turkey)	2–1	(Turkey) İstanbulspor
--:-- UTC+3

== Competitions ==
=== Overall record ===
Competition	First match	Last match	Starting round	Final position	Record							
Competition	First match	Last match	Starting round	Final position	Pld	W	D	L	GF	GA	GD	Win %
Süper Lig	12 August 2023	26 May 2024	Matchday 1	20th	38	4	7	27	27	80	−53	10.53
Turkish Cup	1 November 2023		Third round	Third round	1	0	0	1	2	3	−1	0.00
Total					39	4	7	28	29	83	−54	10.26

Source: Soccerway

=== Süper Lig ===
==== League table ====
Pos	Team	Pld	W	D	L	GF	GA	GD	Pts	Qualification or relegation
16	Konyaspor	38	9	14	15	40	53	−13	41 (Note: Hatayspor are ahead of Konyaspor on overall goal difference.)	
17	Ankaragücü (R)	38	8	16	14	46	52	−6	40 (Note: Ankaragücü are ahead of Fatih Karagümrük on head-to-head points: Fatih Karagümrük 1–1 Ankaragücü, Ankaragücü 2–0 Fatih Karagümrük.)	Relegation to TFF First League
18	Fatih Karagümrük (R)	38	10	10	18	49	52	−3	40	Relegation to TFF First League
19	Pendikspor (R)	38	9	10	19	42	73	−31	37	Relegation to TFF First League
20	İstanbulspor (Note: 3 points deducted) (R)	38	4	7	27	27	80	−53	16	Relegation to TFF First League

Source: Süper Lig
Rules for classification: 1) Points; 2) Head-to-head points; 3) Head-to-head goal difference; 4) Head-to-head goals scored; 5) Goal difference; 6) Goals scored; 7) Play-off.
(R) Relegated

==== Results summary ====
Overall								Home						Away					
Pld	W	D	L	GF	GA	GD	Pts	W	D	L	GF	GA	GD	W	D	L	GF	GA	GD
38	4	7	27	27	80	−53	19	2	3	14	14	39	−25	2	4	13	13	41	−28

Source: Trendyol Süper Lig

==== Results by round ====
Round	1	2	3	4	5	6	7	8	9	10	11	12	13	14	15	16	17	18
Ground	A	H	H	A	H	A	H	A	H	A	H	A	A	H	A	H	H	A
Result	D	D	L	L	L	L	L	L	W	L	L	L	W	L	L	P	L	L
Position	9	11	16	18	20	20	20	20	20	20	20	20	20	20	20	20	20	20

Source: Trendyol Süper Lig
A = Away; H = Home; W = Win; D = Draw; L = Loss

==== Matches ====
The league fixtures were unveiled on 19 July 2023.

17 September 2023 5	İstanbulspor	0–2	İstanbul Başakşehir	Istanbul
				Stadium: Esenyurt Necmi Kadıoğlu Stadium

26 September 2023 3	İstanbulspor	0–1	Galatasaray	Istanbul
				Stadium: Esenyurt Necmi Kadıoğlu Stadium
Note: The match scheduled for 26 August 2023 was postponed due to the UEFA Conference League play-offs.

8 November 2023 4	Samsunspor	2–1	İstanbulspor	Samsun
Note: The match scheduled for 3 September 2023 was postponed

12 November 2023 12	Rizespor	1–0	İstanbulspor	Rize

25 November 2023 13	İstanbulspor	2–1	Hatayspor	Istanbul
				Stadium: Esenyurt Necmi Kadıoğlu Stadium

1 December 2023 14	Fatih Karagümrük	3–0	İstanbulspor	Istanbul

10 December 2023 15	İstanbulspor	0–1	Alanyaspor	Istanbul
				Stadium: Esenyurt Necmi Kadıoğlu Stadium

19 December 2023 17	İstanbulspor	0–3 (w/o)	Trabzonspor	Istanbul
				Stadium: Esenyurt Necmi Kadıoğlu Stadium

23 December 2023	Sivasspor	1–0	İstanbulspor	Sivas

7 January 2024	İstanbulspor	1–5	Fenerbahçe	Istanbul
				Stadium: Esenyurt Necmi Kadıoğlu Stadium

10 January 2024	Adana Demirspor	2–2	İstanbulspor	Adana

14 January 2024	İstanbulspor	0–0	Konyaspor	Istanbul
				Stadium: Esenyurt Necmi Kadıoğlu Stadium

22 January 2024	Kayserispor	0–1	İstanbulspor	Kayseri

25 January 2024	Galatasaray	3–1	İstanbulspor	Istanbul

29 January 2024	İstanbulspor	1–1	Samsunspor	Istanbul
				Stadium: Esenyurt Necmi Kadıoğlu Stadium

3 February 2024 24	İstanbul Başakşehir	2–0	İstanbulspor	Istanbul
16:00 TRT (UTC+3)	Piątek 36', 71'; Ba (yellow card) 90+1'		Rroca (yellow card) 41'	Stadium: Başakşehir Fatih Terim Stadium; Referee: Emre Kargın

11 February 2024 25	İstanbulspor	1–3	Gaziantep	Istanbul
16:00 TRT (UTC+3)	Loshaj 6', (yellow card) 30' (yellow-red card) 70'; Yeşil (yellow card) 45+1'; Erdoğan (yellow card) 59'		Drăguș 15', 60' (pen.), (yellow card) 75'; M'Bakata (yellow card) 82'; Sorescu 90+5'	Stadium: Esenyurt Necmi Kadıoğlu Stadium; Referee: Abdulkadir Bitigen

17 February 2024 26	Antalyaspor	2–2	İstanbulspor	Antalya
13:30 TRT (UTC+3)	Buksa 14', 16'		Gedikli 75'; Jackson 90+9' (pen.)	Stadium: Corendon Airlines Park; Referee: Mehmet Türkmen

25 February 2024 27	İstanbulspor	0–2	Beşiktaş	Istanbul
19:00 TRT (UTC+3)				Stadium: Esenyurt Necmi Kadıoğlu Stadium

2 March 2024 28	Ankaragücü	1–1	İstanbulspor	Ankara
13:30 TRT (UTC+3)				Stadium: Eryaman Stadium

17 May 2024 37	İstanbulspor	v	Sivasspor	Istanbul
17:00				Stadium: Esenyurt Necmi Kadıoğlu Stadium

26 May 2024 38	Fenerbahçe	v	İstanbulspor	Istanbul
				Stadium: Şükrü Saracoğlu Stadium
