= 2026–27 Turkish Cup =

Ziraat Turkish Cup

Tournament details
- Country: Turkey
- Dates: 15 September 2026 – 29 May 2027
- Teams: 146

Tournament statistics
- Matches played: 85
- Goals scored: 295 (3.47 per match)

The 2026–27 Turkish Cup will be the 65th edition of the Turkish Football Cup, also known as the Ziraat Turkish Cup.

The winner of the tournament will qualify for the 2027 Turkish Super Cup and the play-off round of the 2027–28 UEFA Europa League.

As of this season, the format has been changed: the group stage has been eliminated and replaced with a knockout system. The Turkish Cup will consist of five qualifying rounds, the Round of 16, quarter-finals, semi-finals, and the final. The semi-finals will be played over two legs, while all other rounds will be single-match knockout ties. The Turkish Cup qualifying rounds and final stages will be completed over a total of 10 dedicated cup weeks.

Trabzonspor are the defending champions, after winning the cup in the previous edition. They enter the competition in the fifth round.

== Rounds ==
Round	Draw date	Match dates	Total clubs remaining	Clubs involved	Winners from previous round	New entries at this round	Clubs entering in this round per league	Notes
First round	27 August 2026	15-17 September 2026	146	40	0	40	20 PGL teams from provinces that do not have a professional team in the 2026–2027 season; 20 teams that will compete in the TFF 3rd League in the 2026–2027 season, excluding those entering in the second round	single leg
Second round	18 September 2026	6-8 October 2026	126	62	20	42	33 teams, consisting of 26 teams that finished in 8th place or higher (including 8th place) in the TFF 3rd League group standings at the end of the 2025–2026 season, excluding teams promoted to the higher division; 2 teams that were the best-performing 9th-place finishers; and 5 teams promoted from the Professional Transition League (PGL) to the TFF 3rd League; 9 teams that will compete in the TFF 2nd League in the 2026–2027 season, excluding those entering in the third round	single leg; seedings applied
Third round	9 October 2026	27-29 October 2026	95	72	31	41	26 teams, comprising 20 teams that finished between 3rd and 12th place (inclusive) in their respective groups in the TFF 2nd League at the end of the 2025–2026 season, and 6 teams promoted from the TFF 3rd League to the TFF 2nd League; 9 teams that will compete in the TFF 1st League in the 2026–2027 season, excluding those entering in the fourth round; 6 teams that will compete in the TFF Super League in the 2026–2027 season, excluding those entering in the fourth and fifth rounds	single leg; seedings applied
Fourth round	4 November 2026	1-3 December 2026	59	54	36	18	11 teams, comprising the team that finished in 3rd place in the TFF 1st League standings at the end of the 2025–2026 season, 7 teams that finished between 5th and 10th place (inclusive), and 4 teams promoted from the TFF 2nd League to the TFF 1st League; 7 teams, comprising 4 teams that finished between 6th and 9th place (inclusive) in the Süper League standings at the end of the 2025–2026 season, and 3 teams promoted from the TFF 1st League to the Süper League	single leg; seedings applied
Fifth round		15-17 / 22-24 December 2026	32	32	27	5	5 teams, comprising the team that won the Turkish Cup at the end of the 2025–2026 season and 4 teams that qualified for participation in European competitions based on their final standings in the Süper League	single leg; seedings applied
Round of 16		12-14 January 2027	16	16	16	0		single leg; seedings applied
Quarter-finals		9-11 February 2027	8	8	8	0		single leg; seedings applied
Semi-finals		First leg: 2-4 March 2027 Second leg: 20-22 April 2027	4	4	4	0		two legs
Final		29 May 2027	2	2	2	0		single leg; on a neutral ground

== First round ==
20 Third League and 20 Professional Transition League teams competed in this round. No seeding took place in this single-leg round. The draw was held on 27 August 2026. The match schedules were announced on 4 September 2026. 13 Third League, 7 Professional Transition League teams qualified to the next round. Biggest upset was Gaziemir (109) eliminating Bucaspor 1928 (80). Lowest-ranked team qualified for the next round was Gelecek Siirt 56 (135). Highest-ranked team eliminated was Karaman (78).

Number of teams per tier still in competition
Super League (Note: Super League and First League teams began entering the competition in the third round.)	First League	Second League (Note: Second League teams began entering the competition in the second round.)	Third League	Amateur League	Total
18 / 18	20 / 20	35 / 35	53 / 53	20 / 20	146 / 146

=== Matches ===
15 September 2026	1923 Afyonkarahisar (5)	2–1	Ürgüpspor (5)	Afyonkarahisar
17:00	Özbakır 21'; Can 53'		Soysal 28'	Stadium: Zafer

15 September 2026	Altay (4)	2–4	Söke 1970 (4)	Izmir
20:00	Sarıkaya 72'; Pehlivan 90+3'		Bağış 43', 57'; Cakir 45'; Devrim 68'	Stadium: Alsancak Mustafa Denizli

16 September 2026	Adanaspor (4)	3–0 w/o	Yeni Malatyaspor (4)	Adana
14:00				Stadium: Yeni Adana

16 September 2026	Bayburtspor (5)	3–0	Borçkaspor (5)	Bayburt
14:00	Işık 45+3', 56'; Vurgun 90+4' (pen.)			Stadium: Bayburt Genç Osman

16 September 2026	Cizre Belediyespor (5)	0–3 w/o	Hakkari Zapspor (5)	Sirnak
14:00				Stadium: Silopi İlçe

16 September 2026	Dersimspor (5)	0–3	Gelecek Siirt 56 (5)	Tunceli
14:00			Elmas 29'; Eres 43'; Gökhan 86'	Stadium: Tunceli Atatürk

16 September 2026	Gölespor (5)	0–5	Kars 36 (5)	Ardahan
14:00			Özkan 11'; Ateş 60'; Aydoğan 74', 80'; Apuhan 76'	Stadium: Göle Semt

16 September 2026	Karaman (4)	2–3	Kepezspor (4)	Karaman
14:00	Akbaba 13'; Aktaş 73'		Altunbaş 44', 75'; Demirci 62'	Stadium: Yeni Karaman

16 September 2026	Kırıkkale (4)	0–3	Kırşehir (4)	Kirikkale
14:00			Bel 40', 65'; Akar 83'	Stadium: Başpınar

16 September 2026	Kilis Birlikgücü (5)	0–2	Kahta 02 (5)	Kilis
14:00			Çolak 33'; Altunbay 73'	Stadium: 7 Aralık

16 September 2026	Osmaneli (5)	0–1	Eskişehir Anadolu (4)	Bilecik
14:00			Özdemir 86'	Stadium: Osmaneli İlçe

16 September 2026	Sinopspor (5)	0–3	Arıt Kayadibispor (5)	Sinop
14:00			Yeşilsu 1'; Oyit 83'; Bilgin 90+5'	Stadium: Sinop Şehir

16 September 2026	Tokat Belediyespor (4)	3–0	Keşapspor (5)	Tokat
14:00	Pala 9'; Varol 73'; Karakoç 82' (pen.)			Stadium: Tokat Gaziosmanpaşa Üniversitesi

16 September 2026	Galata (4)	2–1 (a.e.t.)	Yalova FK 77 (4)	Istanbul
15:00	Kençtemur 90'; Demir 102'		Sivrikaya 19'	Stadium: İBB Beyoğlu

16 September 2026	İnkılap (4)	1–3	Beykoz Anadoluspor (4)	Istanbul
15:00	Tecimer 15'		Arı 74', 90'; Koçaklı 75'	Stadium: Ömerli

16 September 2026	Uzunköprüspor (5)	1–5	Bulvarspor (4)	Tekirdag
15:00	Özer 4'		Uğurlu 20'; Kocakahya 42'; Cengiz 78'; Kaya 83', 89'	Stadium: Ergene Şehir

16 September 2026	Bucaspor 1928 (4)	0–4	Gaziemir (4)	Izmir
17:00			Çalışkan 14', 64'; Türközü 55'; Bozca 88'	Stadium: Yeni Buca

16 September 2026	Yeni Mersin İdmanyurdu (4)	5–1	Bucak Belediye Oğuzhanspor (5)	Mersin
20:00	Bilgin 4'; Agca 38'; Işık 71'; Yaşa 75'; Kılıç 83' (o.g.)		Bostancı 22'	Stadium: Mersin

17 September 2026	Amasyaspor (4)	10–0	Çankırıgücü (5)	Amasya
14:30	Kınalı 1'; Aksakal 4'; Özbahçeci 6'; Erol 30'; Olgun 32'; Karahan 35', 39'; Kobya 50'; Öztürk 70'; Çelik 85'			Stadium: 12 Haziran

17 September 2026	Orduspor 1967 (4)	10–0	Torul Belediyespor (5)	Ordu
19:00	Kalkan 13', 32'; Metin 17'; Balsu 27', 30'; Tiryaki 35'; Ev 58'; Aybastı 59'; Aynacı 78'; Gün 90'			Stadium: 19 Eylül

== Second round ==
9 Second League, 46 Third League, 7 Professional Transition League teams compete in this round. Seeding took place in this single-leg round. The draw was held on 18 September 2026. The match schedules were announced on 22 September 2026. 19 seeded and 12 unseeded teams qualified for the next round. 6 Second League, 23 Third League, 2 Professional Transition League teams qualified to the next round. Biggest upset was Hakkari Zapspor (127) eliminating Adana Demirspor (42). Lowest-ranked team qualified for the next round was Kars 36 (129). Highest-ranked team eliminated was Hatayspor (41).

Number of teams per tier still in competition
Super League (Note: Super League and First League teams began entering the competition in the third round.)	First League	Second League	Third League	Amateur League	Total
18 / 18	20 / 20	35 / 35	46 / 53	7 / 20	126 / 146

=== Seedings ===
Seeded						Unseeded					
Rank	Team	Rank	Team	Rank	Team	Rank	Team	Rank	Team	Rank	Team
39	Serikspor	76	Kepezspor	90	Malatya Yeşilyurtspor	99	Denizli İdman Yurdu 1959	112	Galata	125	Bigaspor
40	Sakaryaspor	77	Adanaspor	91	Balıkesirspor	100	Karaköprü Belediyespor	113	Tokat Belediyespor	126	1922 Akşehirspor
41	Hatayspor	81	Eskişehirspor	92	Fatsa Belediyespor	101	Pazarspor	114	Eskişehir Anadolu	127	Hakkari Zapspor
42	Adana Demirspor	82	Erciyes 38	93	Bursa Yıldırımspor	102	Beykoz İshaklı	115	Söke 1970	128	1923 Afyonkarahisar
63	Fethiyespor	83	Karşıyaka	94	Mazıdağı Fosfatspor	103	Osmaniyespor	116	Bulvarspor	129	Kars 36
64	Karacabey Belediyespor	84	Karadeniz Ereğli 1980	95	Uşakspor	104	Karabük İdman Yurdu	117	Kırşehir	130	Kahta 02
65	Kırklarelispor	85	Küçükçekmece Sinopspor	96	Zonguldakspor	105	Alanya 1221	118	Orduspor 1967	135	Arıt Kayadibispor
66	Erbaaspor	86	1964 Silifkespor	97	Ağrı 1970	106	Gemlik Sümerbey	120	Amasyaspor	135	Bayburtspor
67	Somaspor	87	Ayvalıkgücü Belediyespor	98	Silivrispor	107	Niğde Belediyesispor	122	Adana Adaletgücü	135	Gelecek Siirt 56
74	Beykoz Anadoluspor	88	Yozgat Belediyesi Bozokspor			108	Düzcespor	123	Bitlis 1916		
75	Yeni Mersin İdmanyurdu	89	Etimesgutspor			109	Gaziemir	124	Gölcükspor		

Bold teams qualified to the next round.

=== Matches ===
6 October 2026	Bitlis 1916 (4)	6–0	1964 Silifkespor (4)	Bitlis
14:00	Ohawuchi 39' (pen.); Gümüş 48'; Arslantaş 63'; İlkin 71', 78'; Dedeoğlu 88'			Stadium: Eren

6 October 2026	Kırklarelispor (3)	1–0 (a.e.t.)	Bayburtspor (5)	Kirklareli
14:00	Akpınar 112'			Stadium: Kırklareli Atatürk

6 October 2026	Sakaryaspor (3)	2–0	Arıt Kayadibispor (5)	Sakarya
17:00	Açıkgöz 46'; Türker 72'			Stadium: Yeni Sakarya Atatürk

6 October 2026	Karşıyaka (4)	3–1	1923 Afyonkarahisar (5)	Izmir
19:00	Şan 26', 51'; Öztürk 76'		Aytekin 19' (o.g.)	Stadium: Alsancak Mustafa Denizli

7 October 2026	Adanaspor (4)	0–2	Adana Adaletgücü (4)	Adana
14:00			Eker 31'; Dalmaz 39'	Stadium: Yeni Adana

7 October 2026	Hakkari Zapspor (5)	6–1	Adana Demirspor (3)	Hakkari
14:00	Kartal 7'; Kılıç 15'; Daniş 18'; Sak 79', 85'; Tektaş 89'		Demirkıran 82' (pen.)	Stadium: Merzan Şehir

7 October 2026	Hatayspor (3)	1–2	Karaköprü Belediyespor (4)	Hatay
14:00	Yıldız 82'		Yıldırım 68'; Karadeniz 80'	Stadium: Reyhanlı Tayfun Sökmen

7 October 2026	Kars 36 (5)	1–0	Fatsa Belediyespor (4)	Kars
14:00	Özkan 24'			Stadium: Kars Atletizm

7 October 2026	Mazıdağı Fosfatspor (4)	1–0	Kırşehir (4)	Mardin
14:00	İstemi 27'			Stadium: Kızıltepe İlçe

7 October 2026	Niğde Belediyesispor (4)	0–2	Ağrı 1970 (4)	Nigde
14:00			İkiz 19'; Gürses 38'	Stadium: Niğde 5 Şubat

7 October 2026	Osmaniyespor (4)	0–3	Yeni Mersin İdmanyurdu (4)	Osmaniye
14:00			Erdoğan 48'; Kayabaş 78'; Işık 88'	Stadium: Cevdetiye

7 October 2026	Pazarspor (4)	3–1	Erbaaspor (3)	Rize
14:00	Fırıncı 59'; Erdoğan 62' (o.g.); Aykurt 90'		Kargı 78'	Stadium: Pazar İlçe

7 October 2026	Somaspor (3)	4–2	Alanya 1221 (4)	Manisa
14:00	Tamer 7'; Pektas 30'; Altınışık 58', 77'		Ölmez 50'; Mumci 63' (pen.)	Stadium: Soma Nazım Yavuz

7 October 2026	Tokat Belediyespor (4)	1–5	Etimesgutspor (4)	Tokat
14:00	Karakoç 1' (pen.)		Arıgün 30'; Bulut 33'; Şahintürk 83'; Durmuş 90'; Dedeoğlu 90+4'	Stadium: Tokat Gaziosmanpaşa Üniversitesi

7 October 2026	Zonguldakspor (4)	0–1	Düzcespor (4)	Zonguldak
14:00			Yavuz 86'	Stadium: Karaelmas Kemal Köksal

7 October 2026	Bigaspor (4)	0–3	Balıkesirspor (4)	Canakkale
14:30			Dede 21' (pen.); Tetik 78'; Durakçay 82'	Stadium: Biga İlyas Bayram

7 October 2026	Bursa Yıldırımspor (4)	2–0	Amasyaspor (4)	Bursa
14:30	Polat 45+2'; Ozler 71'			Stadium: Minareli Çavuş

7 October 2026	Eskişehir Anadolu (4)	4–2	Kepezspor (4)	Eskisehir
14:30	Fidan 25'; Destan 34', 63'; Özdemir 83'		Solaklı 13'; Aygören 61'	Stadium: Osmangazi Üniversitesi

7 October 2026	Gemlik Sümerbey (4)	2–0	Uşakspor (4)	Bursa
14:30	Kumaş 77'; Genç 86'			Stadium: Gemlik Atatürk

7 October 2026	Gölcükspor (4)	2–0	Yozgat Belediyesi Bozokspor (4)	Kocaeli
14:30	Yüksel 37'; Tüktaş 76'			Stadium: Gölcük Şehir

7 October 2026	Karacabey Belediyespor (3)	2–2 (a.e.t.) (5–3 p)	Galata (4)	Bursa
14:30	Kütük 69'; Vural 96'		Çamlı 90+4'; Sipahiler 98'	Stadium: Karacabey Mustafa Fehmi Gerçeker

7 October 2026	Küçükçekmece Sinopspor (4)	5–1	Beykoz İshaklı (4)	Istanbul
14:30	Ensar 21'; Yıldırım 48'; Gökbayrak 78', 87'; Aksoy 85'		Avan 6'	Stadium: İBB 100. Yıl

7 October 2026	Silivrispor (4)	3–2	Bulvarspor (4)	Istanbul
14:30	Açıkalın 57'; Pazar 60'; Aydın 71'		Cebeci 36'; Üreyen 46'	Stadium: Silivri Müjdat Gürsu

7 October 2026	Söke 1970 (4)	1–2 (a.e.t.)	Ayvalıkgücü Belediyespor (4)	Aydin
14:30	Deniz 38'		Timurcioğlu 74'; Gürler 111'	Stadium: Söke İlçe

7 October 2026	Gaziemir (4)	0–2	Fethiyespor (3)	Izmir
15:00			Erdogan 71'; Camcı 86'	Stadium: Bornova Aziz Kocaoğlu

7 October 2026	Karabük İdman Yurdu (4)	1–0	Beykoz Anadoluspor (4)	Karabuk
15:00	Aydın 34'			Stadium: Dr. Necmettin Şeyhoğlu

7 October 2026	Malatya Yeşilyurtspor (4)	3–1	Gelecek Siirt 56 (5)	Malatya
17:00	Yılmaz 34'; Fırat 52' (o.g.); Taş 90+1' (o.g.)		Çelik 89'	Stadium: Yeni Malatya

7 October 2026	Eskişehirspor (4)	4–1	1922 Akşehirspor (4)	Eskisehir
20:00	Arslantaş 6'; Yıldırım 19'; Kaya 71', 78'		Özder 36'	Stadium: Prof. Dr. Fethi Heper

8 October 2026	Erciyes 38 (4)	2–0	Kahta 02 (5)	Kayseri
14:00	Tosun 72'; Şanlitürk 90+3'			Stadium: Kayseri Atatürk

8 October 2026	Denizli İdman Yurdu 1959 (4)	0–1	Serikspor (3)	Denizli
17:00			Yıldız 4'	Stadium: Denizli Atatürk

8 October 2026	Orduspor 1967 (4)	4–1	Karadeniz Ereğli 1980 (4)	Ordu
20:00	Fidan 48'; Metin 56'; Efe 65'; İnanç 81'		Güler 80' (pen.)	Stadium: 19 Eylül

=== Upsets ===
Giantkiller	Opponent (tier)
Upset of two leagues above
Hakkari Zapspor (level 5)	6–1 at home vs Adana Demirspor (level 3)

== Third round ==
6 Super League, 9 First League, 32 Second League, 23 Third League, 2 Professional Transition League teams compete in this round. Seeding took place in this single-leg round. The draw was held on 9 October 2026. The match schedules were announced on 14 October 2026. 22 seeded and 14 unseeded teams qualified for the next round. 6 Super League, 5 First League, 13 Second League and 12 Third League teams qualified to the next round. Biggest upset was Bitlis 1916 (123) eliminating Kayserispor (20). Lowest-ranked team qualified for the next round was Bitlis 1916 (123). Highest-ranked team eliminated was Kayserispor (20).

Number of teams per tier still in competition
Super League	First League	Second League	Third League	Amateur League	Total
18 / 18	20 / 20	32 / 35	23 / 53	2 / 20	95 / 146

=== Seedings ===
Seeded						Unseeded					
Rank	Team	Rank	Team	Rank	Team	Rank	Team	Rank	Team	Rank	Team
10	Kocaelispor	32	Vanspor	50	Ankaragücü	62	Kastamonuspor	81	Eskişehirspor	100	Karaköprü Belediyespor
11	Alanyaspor	33	Boluspor	51	Güzide Gebzespor	63	Fethiyespor	82	Erciyes 38	101	Pazarspor
12	Gaziantep	34	Ümraniyespor	52	İnegölspor	64	Karacabey Belediyespor	83	Karşıyaka	104	Karabük İdman Yurdu
13	Kasımpaşa	39	Serikspor	53	İskenderunspor	65	Kırklarelispor	85	Küçükçekmece Sinopspor	106	Gemlik Sümerbey
14	Gençlerbirliği	40	Sakaryaspor	54	Menemen	67	Somaspor	87	Ayvalıkgücü Belediyespor	108	Düzcespor
15	Eyüpspor	43	Muşspor	55	Beyoğlu Yeni Çarşı	68	Kütahyaspor	89	Etimesgutspor	114	Eskişehir Anadolu
19	Antalyaspor	44	Elazığspor	56	Ankara Demirspor	69	Sebatspor	90	Malatya Yeşilyurtspor	118	Orduspor 1967
20	Kayserispor	45	Aliağa	57	Ankaraspor	70	İnegöl Kafkasspor	91	Balıkesirspor	122	Adana Adaletgücü
21	Karagümrük	46	Adana 01	58	68 Aksaray Belediyespor	71	12 Bingölspor	93	Bursa Yıldırımspor	123	Bitlis 1916
29	İstanbulspor	47	Kahramanmaraş İstiklalspor	59	Erzincanspor	72	Çorluspor 1947	94	Mazıdağı Fosfatspor	124	Gölcükspor
30	Sarıyer	48	Şanlıurfaspor	60	1461 Trabzon	73	52 Orduspor	97	Ağrı 1970	127	Hakkari Zapspor
31	Iğdır	49	Isparta 32	61	Arnavutköy Belediyespor	75	Yeni Mersin İdmanyurdu	98	Silivrispor	129	Kars 36

Bold teams qualified to the next round.

=== Matches ===
27 October 2026	Ağrı 1970 (4)	1–2	İstanbulspor (2)	Agri
13:00	Yılmaz 87'		Nizam 71', 85'	Stadium: Vali Lütfü Yeğenoğlu

27 October 2026	Etimesgutspor (4)	0–4	Gaziantep (1)	Ankara
13:30			Kulasin 7'; Sarıkaya 41'; Gassama 74'; Dervişoğlu 90'	Stadium: Etimesgut Belediyesi Atatürk

27 October 2026	İnegöl Kafkasspor (3)	1–4	Kahramanmaraş İstiklalspor (3)	Bursa
13:30	Aykut Demirci 87'		Oruç 22'; Talay 33'; Altıntaş 49' (pen.); Taşkın 90+1'	Stadium: İnegöl İlçe

27 October 2026	Adana Adaletgücü (4)	1–2	Ankaragücü (3)	Adana
15:00	Nas 30'		Göktas 68' (pen.), 75'	Stadium: Yeni Adana

27 October 2026	Elazığspor (3)	0–2	Erciyes 38 (4)	Elazig
15:00			Yasak 74', 90+3'	Stadium: Elazığ Atatürk

27 October 2026	Orduspor 1967 (4)	2–0	Vanspor (2)	Ordu
15:00	Ergen 19'; Balsu 79'			Stadium: 19 Eylül

27 October 2026	Sarıyer (2)	1–0	Ayvalıkgücü Belediyespor (4)	Istanbul
15:00	Şen 84'			Stadium: Yusuf Ziya Öniş

27 October 2026	Yeni Mersin İdmanyurdu (4)	1–2	Muşspor (3)	Mersin
15:00	Erdoğan 81'		Çelik 13' (pen.); Burgaz 19'	Stadium: Mersin

27 October 2026	Boluspor (2)	1–3 (a.e.t.)	Karşıyaka (4)	Bolu
15:30	Çaylı 16'		Adamcıl 90+1' (pen.); Akgüc 105'; Şan 119'	Stadium: Bolu Atatürk

27 October 2026	Kocaelispor (1)	3–0	Mazıdağı Fosfatspor (4)	Kocaeli
18:00	Altunbaş 45', 80'; Agyei 72'			Stadium: Kocaeli

27 October 2026	Alanyaspor (1)	4–1	12 Bingölspor (3)	Antalya
20:30	Hwang 1'; Ali 6'; Cedric 77'; Özdemir 90+1'		Sarka 65'	Stadium: Alanya Oba

28 October 2026	Ankara Demirspor (3)	0–1	Gemlik Sümerbey (4)	Ankara
13:30			Ceylan 26'	Stadium: Etimesgut Belediyesi Atatürk

28 October 2026	Düzcespor (4)	0–2	Isparta 32 (3)	Duzce
13:30			Aktay 73'; Tiryaki 90+1'	Stadium: Düzce Şehir

28 October 2026	Eskişehir Anadolu (4)	3–1	68 Aksaray Belediyespor (3)	Eskisehir
13:30	Akgün 49'; Kılıçaslan 77'; Özçelik 90+5'		Derin 50'	Stadium: Osmangazi Üniversitesi

28 October 2026	Kastamonuspor (3)	1–4	Erzincanspor (3)	Kastamonu
13:30	Köse 2'		Papaker 22'; Akçagün 38', 42'; Çelik 65'	Stadium: Gazi

28 October 2026	Güzide Gebzespor (3)	0–4	Malatya Yeşilyurtspor (4)	Kocaeli
13:30			Nalbantoğlu 32'; Yılmaz 41', 59'; Alşimşek 55'	Stadium: Gebze Alaettin Kurt

28 October 2026	İnegölspor (3)	1–4	Sebatspor (3)	Bursa
13:30	Altıntaş 17' (pen.)		Güventürk 2', 67'; Karadeniz 32', 39'	Stadium: İnegöl İlçe

28 October 2026	Kars 36 (5)	0–2	Antalyaspor (2)	Kars
13:30			Saric 5'; Altun 90+2'	Stadium: Kars Atletizm

27 October 2026	Pazarspor (4)	0–1	Aliağa (3)	Rize
13:30			Gedikli 6'	Stadium: Pazar İlçe

28 October 2026	Serikspor (3)	1–1 (a.e.t.) (5-4 p)	Hakkari Zapspor (5)	Antalya
13:30	Köşker 90'		Tektaş 63'	Stadium: Serik İsmail Ogan
	Penalties
	Çelenk (penalty scored); Aktaş (penalty scored); Taşkıran (penalty scored); Öğrüce (penalty scored); Atila (penalty scored)		(penalty scored) Kılıç; (penalty missed) Kural; (penalty scored) Köroğlu; (penalty scored) Kama; (penalty scored) Kartal

28 October 2026	Silivrispor (4)	3–2	Beyoğlu Yeni Çarşı (3)	Istanbul
13:30	Atış 18', 26'; Vardar 63'		Uzun 68', 81' (pen.)	Stadium: Silivri Müjdat Gürsu

28 October 2026	Ankaraspor (3)	3–2 (a.e.t.)	Kırklarelispor (3)	Ankara
13:30	Adıgüzel 9'; Yahşi 16'; Demir 103'		Köse 82'; Koç 89'	Stadium: Sincan 15 Temmuz Milli Birlik

28 October 2026	Adana 01 (3)	2–1 (a.e.t.)	Kütahyaspor (3)	Adana
15:00	Sezen 38'; Kurt 114'		Fedai 45'	Stadium: Yeni Adana

28 October 2026	Balıkesirspor (4)	1–0	Arnavutköy Belediyespor (3)	Balikesir
15:00	Yılmaz 54'			Stadium: Balıkesir Atatürk

28 October 2026	Karagümrük (2)	0–0 (a.e.t.) (3-1 p)	Somaspor (3)	Istanbul
15:00				Stadium: Yusuf Ziya Öniş
	Penalties
	Yalçın (penalty scored); Kalaycı (penalty scored); Demir (penalty missed); Çukur (penalty scored)		(penalty missed) Keklik; (penalty scored) Erkan; (penalty missed) F. Gündüz; (penalty missed) M. Gündüz

28 October 2026	Karabük İdman Yurdu (4)	3–0 w/o	İskenderunspor (3)	Karabuk
15:00				Stadium: Dr. Necmettin Şeyhoğlu

28 October 2026	Menemen (3)	0–1	Karacabey Belediyespor (3)	Izmir
15:00			Çetin 71'	Stadium: Menemen İlçe

28 October 2026	Şanlıurfaspor (3)	3–1	Gölcükspor (4)	Sanliurfa
15:00	Ekinci 10'; Doğan 43'; Işık 63'		Gümüşel 87'	Stadium: 11 Nisan

28 October 2026	Ümraniyespor (2)	2–1 (a.e.t.)	Küçükçekmece Sinopspor (4)	Istanbul
15:00	Bostan 28'; Özdemir 104'		Baran 86' (pen.)	Stadium: Ümraniye Belediyesi Şehir

4 November 2026	Fethiyespor (3)	2–4	Eyüpspor (1)	Muğla
13:00	Türkmen 36' (pen.); Akgün 45'		Pintor 20'; El Yamiq 45'; Sadia 47'; Sabiri 53'	Stadium: Fethiye İlçe

28 October 2026	Sakaryaspor (3)	2–3	Bursa Yıldırımspor (4)	Sakarya
18:00	Akoğlu 57'; Akkan 81'		Yüceer 36'; Polat 68'; Çağdaş 78'	Stadium: Yeni Sakarya Atatürk

28 October 2026	52 Orduspor (3)	0–2	1461 Trabzon (3)	Ordu
20:30			Bozkurt 25'; Polat 29'	Stadium: 19 Eylül

29 October 2026	Bitlis 1916 (4)	4–1	Kayserispor (2)	Bitlis
13:30	Akkuş 30'; Arslantaş 45'; Yılmaz 53'; İlkin 80'		Denizli 63' (o.g.)	Stadium: Eren

29 October 2026	Gençlerbirliği (1)	5–0	Karaköprü Belediyespor (4)	Ankara
15:30	Mendes 1'; Yavaş 13' (o.g.); Niasse 30'; Özcan 84'; Orakpo 90+2'			Stadium: Eryaman

29 October 2026	Kasımpaşa (1)	3–1	Çorluspor 1947 (3)	Istanbul
18:00	Diarra 45'; Deniz 60'; Kol 82'		Kaplan 56'	Stadium: Recep Tayyip Erdoğan

29 October 2026	Eskişehirspor (4)	1–0	Iğdır (2)	Eskisehir
20:30	Baykuş 90+7'			Stadium: Prof. Dr. Fethi Heper

=== Upsets ===
Giantkiller	Opponent (tier)
Upset of two leagues above
Orduspor 1967 (level 4)	2–0 at home vs Vanspor (level 2)
Karşıyaka (level 4)	3–1 away vs Boluspor (level 2)
Bitlis 1916 (level 4)	4–1 at home vs Kayserispor (level 2)
Eskişehirspor (level 4)	1–0 at home vs Iğdır (level 2)

== Fourth round ==
13 Super League, 16 First League, 13 Second League, 12 Third League teams compete in this round. Seeding took place in this single-leg round. The draw was held on 4 November 2026. The match schedules were announced on 13 November 2026.

Super League	First League	Second League	Third League	Amateur League	Total
18 / 18	16 / 20	13 / 35	12 / 53	0 / 20	59 / 146

=== Seedings ===
Seeded						Unseeded					
Rank	Team	Rank	Team	Rank	Team	Rank	Team	Rank	Team	Rank	Team
6	Göztepe	15	Eyüpspor	25	Keçiörengücü	37	Mardin 1969	50	Ankaragücü	90	Malatya Yeşilyurtspor
7	Samsunspor	16	Erzurumspor	26	Bandırmaspor	38	Muğlaspor	57	Ankaraspor	91	Balıkesirspor
8	Rizespor	17	Amedspor	27	Manisa	39	Serikspor	59	Erzincanspor	93	Bursa Yıldırımspor
9	Konyaspor	18	Çorum	28	Sivasspor	43	Muşspor	60	1461 Trabzon	98	Silivrispor
10	Kocaelispor	19	Antalyaspor	29	İstanbulspor	45	Aliağa	64	Karacabey Belediyespor	104	Karabük İdman Yurdu
11	Alanyaspor	21	Karagümrük	30	Sarıyer	46	Adana 01	69	Sebatspor	106	Gemlik Sümerbey
12	Gaziantep	22	Esenler Erokspor	34	Ümraniyespor	47	Kahramanmaraş İstiklalspor	81	Eskişehirspor	114	Eskişehir Anadolu
13	Kasımpaşa	23	Bodrumspor	35	Bursaspor	48	Şanlıurfaspor	82	Erciyes 38	118	Orduspor 1967
14	Gençlerbirliği	24	Pendikspor	36	Batman Petrolspor	49	Isparta 32	83	Karşıyaka	123	Bitlis 1916

Bold teams qualified to the next round.

=== Matches ===
1 December 2026	Gemlik Sümerbey (4)	–	Rizespor (1)	Bursa
13:00				Stadium: Gemlik Atatürk

1 December 2026	Bandırmaspor (2)	–	Ankaraspor (3)	Balikesir
13:30				Stadium: Bandırma 17 Eylül

1 December 2026	Manisa (2)	–	Sebatspor (3)	Manisa
13:30				Stadium: Manisa 19 Mayıs

1 December 2026	Şanlıurfaspor (3)	–	Ümraniyespor (2)	Sanliurfa
13:30				Stadium: 11 Nisan

1 December 2026	Balıkesirspor (4)	–	İstanbulspor (2)	Balikesir
15:00				Stadium: Balıkesir Atatürk

1 December 2026	Gaziantep (1)	–	Aliağa (3)	Gaziantep
15:30				Stadium: Gaziantep

1 December 2026	Isparta 32 (3)	–	Alanyaspor (1)	Isparta
18:00				Stadium: Isparta Atatürk

1 December 2026	Karabük İdman Yurdu (4)	–	Konyaspor (1)	Karabuk
20:30				Stadium: Dr. Necmettin Şeyhoğlu

2 December 2026	Kahramanmaraş İstiklalspor (3)	–	Erzurumspor (1)	Kahramanmaras
13:00				Stadium: Kahramanmaraş Merkez

2 December 2026	Adana 01 (3)	–	Esenler Erokspor (2)	Adana
13:30				Stadium: Ali Hoşfikirer

2 December 2026	Batman Petrolspor (2)	–	Malatya Yeşilyurtspor (4)	Batman
13:30				Stadium: Batman

2 December 2026	Keçiörengücü (2)	–	Mardin 1969 (2)	Ankara
13:30				Stadium: Aktepe

2 December 2026	Silivrispor (4)	–	Bursaspor (2)	Istanbul
13:30				Stadium: Silivri Müjdat Gürsu

2 December 2026	Sivasspor (2)	–	Muğlaspor (2)	Sivas
13:30				Stadium: 4 Eylül

2 December 2026	1461 Trabzon (3)	–	Sarıyer (2)	Trabzon
13:30				Stadium: Ortahisar Yavuz Selim

2 December 2026	Eskişehir Anadolu (4)	–	Samsunspor (1)	Eskisehir
14:00				Stadium: Osmangazi Üniversitesi

2 December 2026	Antalyaspor (2)	–	Bursa Yıldırımspor (4)	Antalya
15:00				Stadium: Antalya

2 December 2026	Bodrumspor (2)	–	Eskişehirspor (4)	Muğla
15:00				Stadium: Bodrum İlçe

2 December 2026	Erzincanspor (3)	–	Pendikspor (2)	Erzincan
15:00				Stadium: Erzincan 13 Şubat Şehir

2 December 2026	Orduspor 1967 (4)	–	Karagümrük (2)	Ordu
15:00				Stadium: 19 Eylül

2 December 2026	Karacabey Belediyespor (3)	–	Çorum (1)	Bursa
15:30				Stadium: Karacabey Mustafa Fehmi Gerçeker

2 December 2026	Kocaelispor (1)	–	Serikspor (3)	Kocaeli
18:00				Stadium: Kocaeli

2 December 2026	Amedspor (1)	–	Karşıyaka (4)	Diyarbakir
20:30				Stadium: Diyarbakır

3 December 2026	Bitlis 1916 (4)	–	Kasımpaşa (1)	Bitlis
13:00				Stadium: Eren

3 December 2026	Eyüpspor (1)	–	Muşspor (3)	İstanbul
15:30				Stadium: Esenyurt Necmi Kadıoğlu

3 December 2026	Ankaragücü (3)	–	Gençlerbirliği (1)	Ankara
18:00				Stadium: Eryaman

3 December 2026	Göztepe (1)	–	Erciyes 38 (4)	İzmir
20:30				Stadium: Isonem Park Gürsel Aksel

== Fifth round ==
=== Seedings ===
Seeded				Unseeded				Unknown yet	
Rank	Team	Rank	Team	Rank	Team	Rank	Team	Rank	Team
1	Trabzonspor								
2	Galatasaray								
3	Fenerbahçe								
4	Beşiktaş								
5	Başakşehir								

Bold teams qualified to the next round.

== Top scorers ==
Rank	Player	Club	Goals
1	(Turkey) Enes İslam İlkin	Bitlis 1916	3
1	(Turkey) Eren Arda Şan	Karşıyaka	3
1	(Turkey) Muhammed Enes Yılmaz	Malatya Yeşilyurtspor	3
1	(Turkey) Taha Ahmet Balsu	Orduspor 1967	3
2	(Turkey) Ahmet Gökbayrak	Küçükçekmece Sinopspor	2
2	(Turkey) Ali Kemal Özkan	Kars 36	2
2	(Turkey) Alihan Bel	Kırşehir	2
2	(Turkey) Arda Işık	Yeni Mersin İdmanyurdu	2
2	(Germany) Arel Polat	Bursa Yıldırımspor	2
2	(Turkey) Barışcan Işık Altunbaş	Kepezspor	2
2	(Turkey) Berat Kalkan	Orduspor 1967	2
2	(Turkey) Berk Ali Nizam	İstanbulspor	2
2	(Turkey) Buğra Akçagün	Erzincanspor	2
2	(Turkey) Çağrı Yasak	Erciyes 38	2
2	(Turkey) Emre Aydoğan	Kars 36	2
2	(Turkey) Güneş Güventürk	Sebatspor	2
2	(Turkey) Halit Furkan Kaya	Bulvarspor	2
2	(Turkey) Hasan Kaya	Eskişehirspor	2
2	(Turkey) İliyaz Işık	Bayburtspor	2
2	(Turkey) Kağan Bağış	Söke 1970	2
2	(Turkey) Mehmet Ali Tektaş	Hakkari Zapspor	2
2	(Turkey) Mehmet Melih Altınışık	Somaspor	2
2	(Turkey) Metehan Altunbaş	Kocaelispor	2
2	(Turkey) Muhammed Arda Uzun	Beyoğlu Yeni Çarşı	2
2	(Turkey) Muhammed Samed Karakoç	Tokat Belediyespor	2
2	(Turkey) Muhammet Arslantaş	Bitlis 1916	2
2	(Turkey) Muhammet Karahan	Amasyaspor	2
2	(Turkey) Mustafa Çalışkan	Gaziemir	2
2	(Turkey) Onur Arı	Beykoz Anadoluspor	2
2	(Turkey) Osman Burak Destan	Eskişehir Anadolu	2
2	(Turkey) Recep Metin	Orduspor 1967	2
2	(Turkey) Thierry Darnel Karadeniz	Sebatspor	2
2	(Turkey) Yasin Atış	Silivrispor	2
2	(Turkey) Yusuf Göktas	Ankaragücü	2

As of November 4, 2026. Bold players are still in the competition. Source:

== Seedings ==
The teams to be seeded shall be determined in the following order of priority: (a) The champion of the 2025–2026 Turkish Cup; (b) Teams competing in a higher league in the 2026–2027 season; (c) Teams competing in a higher league in the 2025–2026 season and (d) Teams that finished higher in the standings at the end of the 2025–2026 season. When seeded teams are determined pursuant to (d), if a league consists of more than one group: (a) Among teams in different groups that finished in the same position, the team with the higher number of points shall be seeded. If the groups have different numbers of teams, the team with the higher points-per-game average shall be seeded; (b) If the points or points-per-game averages are equal, the team with the better goal difference shall be seeded; (c) If the goal difference is also equal, the team that has scored more goals shall be seeded.

Seed	Team	Round	2026-27	2025-26	Rank	Seed	Team	Round	2026-27	2025-26	Rank	Seed	Team	Round	2026-27	2025-26	Rank
1	Trabzonspor	5th	SL	SL	CW	51	Güzide Gebzespor	3rd	2L	2L	7 (1.71)	101	Pazarspor	2nd	3L	3L	7 (1.43)
2	Galatasaray	5th	SL	SL	1	52	İnegölspor	3rd	2L	2L	7 (1.67)	102	Beykoz İshaklı	2nd	3L	3L	7 (1.33)
3	Fenerbahçe	5th	SL	SL	2	53	İskenderunspor	3rd	2L	2L	8 (1.56)	103	Osmaniyespor	2nd	3L	3L	8 (1.40)
4	Beşiktaş	5th	SL	SL	4	54	Menemen	3rd	2L	2L	8 (1.50)	104	Karabük İdman Yurdu	2nd	3L	3L	8 (1.37)
5	Başakşehir	5th	SL	SL	5	55	Beyoğlu Yeni Çarşı	3rd	2L	2L	9 (1.50)	105	Alanya 1221	2nd	3L	3L	8 (1.27; -5)
6	Göztepe	4th	SL	SL	6	56	Ankara Demirspor	3rd	2L	2L	9 (1.44)	106	Gemlik Sümerbey	2nd	3L	3L	8 (1.27; -9)
7	Samsunspor	4th	SL	SL	7	57	Ankaraspor	3rd	2L	2L	10 (1.44)	107	Niğde Belediyesispor	2nd	3L	3L	9 (1.37)
8	Rizespor	4th	SL	SL	8	58	68 Aksaray Belediyespor	3rd	2L	2L	10 (1.38)	108	Düzcespor	2nd	3L	3L	9 (1.33)
9	Konyaspor	4th	SL	SL	9	59	Erzincanspor	3rd	2L	2L	11 (1.42)	109	Gaziemir	1st	3L	3L	9 (1.23; +8)
10	Kocaelispor	3rd	SL	SL	10	60	1461 Trabzon	3rd	2L	2L	11 (1.38)	110	Yalova FK 77	1st	3L	3L	9 (1.23; +2)
11	Alanyaspor	3rd	SL	SL	11	61	Arnavutköy Belediyespor	3rd	2L	2L	12 (1.35)	111	Kırıkkale	1st	3L	3L	10 (1.33)
12	Gaziantep	3rd	SL	SL	12	62	Kastamonuspor	3rd	2L	2L	12 (1.17)	112	Galata	1st	3L	3L	10 (1.23)
13	Kasımpaşa	3rd	SL	SL	13	63	Fethiyespor	2nd	2L	2L	13 (1.29)	113	Tokat Belediyespor	1st	3L	3L	10 (1.20)
14	Gençlerbirliği	3rd	SL	SL	14	64	Karacabey Belediyespor	2nd	2L	2L	13 (1.14)	114	Eskişehir Anadolu	1st	3L	3L	10 (1.17)
15	Eyüpspor	3rd	SL	SL	15	65	Kırklarelispor	2nd	2L	2L	14	115	Söke 1970	1st	3L	3L	11 (1.17; -4)
16	Erzurumspor	4th	SL	1L	1	66	Erbaaspor	2nd	2L	2L	15 (0.94)	116	Bulvarspor	1st	3L	3L	11 (1.17; -12)
17	Amedspor	4th	SL	1L	2	67	Somaspor	2nd	2L	2L	15 (0.88)	117	Kırşehir	1st	3L	3L	11 (1.13; -1)
18	Çorum	4th	SL	1L	4	68	Kütahyaspor	3rd	2L	3L	1 (2.50)	118	Orduspor 1967	1st	3L	3L	11 (1.13; -16)
19	Antalyaspor	3rd	1L	SL	16	69	Sebatspor	3rd	2L	3L	1 (2.23)	119	İnkılap	1st	3L	3L	12 (1.17)
20	Kayserispor	3rd	1L	SL	17	70	İnegöl Kafkasspor	3rd	2L	3L	1 (2.07)	120	Amasyaspor	1st	3L	3L	12 (1.10)
21	Karagümrük	3rd	1L	SL	18	71	12 Bingölspor	3rd	2L	3L	1 (2.00)	121	Altay	1st	3L	3L	12 (0.93)
22	Esenler Erokspor	4th	1L	1L	3	72	Çorluspor 1947	3rd	2L	3L	2 (2.03)	122	Adaletgücü	2nd	3L	AL	1 (2.57)
23	Bodrumspor	4th	1L	1L	5	73	52 Orduspor	3rd	2L	3L	2 (1.93)	123	Bitlis 1916	2nd	3L	AL	1 (2.46)
24	Pendikspor	4th	1L	1L	6	74	Beykoz Anadoluspor	1st	3L	2L	16 (0.83)	124	Gölcükspor	2nd	3L	AL	1 (2.29; +37)
25	Keçiörengücü	4th	1L	1L	7	75	Yeni Mersin İdmanyurdu	1st	3L	2L	16 (0.38)	125	Bigaspor	2nd	3L	AL	1 (2.29; +36)
26	Bandırmaspor	4th	1L	1L	8	76	Kepezspor	1st	3L	2L	17 (0.64)	126	1922 Akşehirspor	2nd	3L	AL	2
27	Manisa	4th	1L	1L	9	77	Adanaspor	1st	3L	2L	17 (0.03)	127	Hakkari Zapspor	1st	AL	AL	2
28	Sivasspor	4th	1L	1L	10	78	Karaman	1st	3L	2L	18 (0.58)	128	1923 Afyonkarahisar	1st	AL	AL	5
29	İstanbulspor	3rd	1L	1L	11	79	Yeni Malatyaspor	1st	3L	2L	18 (-1.50)	129	Kars 36	1st	AL	AL	6 (1.81)
30	Sarıyer	3rd	1L	1L	12	80	Bucaspor 1928	1st	3L	2L	19	130	Kahta 02	1st	AL	AL	6 (1.73)
31	Iğdır	3rd	1L	1L	13	81	Eskişehirspor	2nd	3L	3L	2 (2.37)	131	Dersimspor	1st	AL	AL	7
32	Vanspor	3rd	1L	1L	14	82	Erciyes 38	2nd	3L	3L	2 (1.63)	132	Sinopspor	1st	AL	AL	9
33	Boluspor	3rd	1L	1L	15	83	Karşıyaka	2nd	3L	3L	3 (2.23)	133	Bucak Belediye Oğuzhanspor	1st	AL	AL	10
34	Ümraniyespor	3rd	1L	1L	16	84	Karadeniz Ereğli 1980	2nd	3L	3L	3 (1.90)	134	Uzunköprüspor	1st	AL	AL	11
35	Bursaspor	4th	1L	2L	1 (2.35)	85	Küçükçekmece Sinopspor	2nd	3L	3L	3 (1.87)	135	Çankırıgücü	1st	AL	N/A	N/A
36	Batman Petrolspor	4th	1L	2L	1 (2.31)	86	1964 Silifkespor	2nd	3L	3L	3 (1.60)	135	Bayburtspor	1st	AL	N/A	N/A
37	Mardin 1969	4th	1L	2L	2 (2.09)	87	Ayvalıkgücü Belediyespor	2nd	3L	3L	4 (1.97)	135	Arıt Kayadibispor	1st	AL	N/A	N/A
38	Muğlaspor	4th	1L	2L	2 (2.00)	88	Yozgat Belediyesi Bozokspor	2nd	3L	3L	4 (1.90)	135	Borçkaspor	1st	AL	N/A	N/A
39	Serikspor	2nd	2L	1L	17	89	Etimesgutspor	2nd	3L	3L	4 (1.73)	135	Cizre Belediyespor	1st	AL	N/A	N/A
40	Sakaryaspor	2nd	2L	1L	18	90	Malatya Yeşilyurtspor	2nd	3L	3L	4 (1.57)	135	Gelecek Siirt 56	1st	AL	N/A	N/A
41	Hatayspor	2nd	2L	1L	19	91	Balıkesirspor	2nd	3L	3L	5 (1.93)	135	Gölespor	1st	AL	N/A	N/A
42	Adana Demirspor	2nd	2L	1L	20	92	Fatsa Belediyespor	2nd	3L	3L	5 (1.63; +8)	135	Keşapspor	1st	AL	N/A	N/A
43	Muşspor	3rd	2L	2L	3 (2.06)	93	Bursa Yıldırımspor	2nd	3L	3L	5 (1.63; +7)	135	Kilis Birlikgücü	1st	AL	N/A	N/A
44	Elazığspor	3rd	2L	2L	3 (1.92)	94	Mazıdağı Fosfatspor	2nd	3L	3L	5 (1.57)	135	Osmaneli	1st	AL	N/A	N/A
45	Aliağa	3rd	2L	2L	4 (2.03)	95	Uşakspor	2nd	3L	3L	6 (1.60)	135	Torul Belediyespor	1st	AL	N/A	N/A
46	Adana 01	3rd	2L	2L	4 (1.86)	96	Zonguldakspor	2nd	3L	3L	6 (1.53)	135	Ürgüpspor	1st	AL	N/A	N/A
47	Kahramanmaraş İstiklalspor	3rd	2L	2L	5 (1.97)	97	Ağrı 1970	2nd	3L	3L	6 (1.50)						
48	Şanlıurfaspor	3rd	2L	2L	5 (1.81)	98	Silivrispor	2nd	3L	3L	6 (1.43)						
49	Isparta 32	3rd	2L	2L	6 (1.85)	99	Denizli İdman Yurdu 1959	2nd	3L	3L	7 (1.57)						
50	Ankaragücü	3rd	2L	2L	6 (1.75)	100	Karaköprü Belediyespor	2nd	3L	3L	7 (1.47)						
