= Jason Lokilo =

Congolese footballer

Personal information
- Full name: Jason Eyenga Lokilo
- Date of birth: 17 September 1998 (age 28)
- Place of birth: Brussels, Belgium
- Height: 1.75 m (5 ft 9 in)
- Position: Winger

Team information
- Current team: Piast Gliwice
- Number: 98

Youth career
- 2007–2014: Anderlecht
- 2015–2017: Crystal Palace

Senior career*
Years	Team	Apps	(Gls)
2017–2020	Crystal Palace	0	(0)
2018–2019	→ Lorient (loan)	4	(0)
2020	→ Doncaster Rovers (loan)	1	(0)
2020–2021	Doncaster Rovers	32	(1)
2021–2022	Górnik Łęczna	25	(2)
2022–2023	Sparta Rotterdam	7	(0)
2023	→ İstanbulspor (loan)	16	(4)
2023–2024	Hull City	18	(0)
2024	→ Vizela (loan)	10	(1)
2024–2025	CSKA Sofia	24	(1)
2025–	Piast Gliwice	21	(0)

International career
2015	DR Congo U17	1	(0)
- * Club domestic league appearances and goals as of 22:06, 29 May 2026 (UTC)

Jason Eyenga Lokilo (born 17 September 1998) is a professional footballer who plays as a winger for Ekstraklasa club Piast Gliwice. Born in Belgium, he represented the Democratic Republic of Congo at youth level.

== Early life ==
Lokilo was born in Brussels, Belgium on 17 September 1998.

== Club career ==
Lokilo was a member of the Anderlecht academy between 2007 and 2014. He signed for Crystal Palace in July 2015, spending the following two seasons playing for their youth teams. Following a number of appearances for the first team in pre-season games, Lokilo made his senior debut for Crystal Palace on 22 August 2017 against Ipswich Town in the EFL Cup.

In August 2018, he joined French club Lorient on a season-long loan.

=== Doncaster Rovers ===
In January 2020, he joined League One club Doncaster Rovers on loan until the end of the 2019–20 season, at which time he was released by Crystal Palace. On 2 August 2020, he re-joined Doncaster Rovers on a one-year deal. In June 2021, he left Doncaster Rovers after failing to agree a new deal.

=== Górnik Łęczna ===
On 9 September 2021, he signed a two-year contract with Polish club Górnik Łęczna.

=== Sparta Rotterdam ===
On 24 June 2022, Lokilo moved to Sparta Rotterdam in the Netherlands with a contract for two seasons, with an option for a third season. On 20 January 2023, he was loaned to İstanbulspor in Turkey until the end of the 2022–23 season. On 6 July 2023, Lokilo was released from his Sparta contract by mutual consent.

=== Hull City ===
On 18 July 2023, Lokilo returned to England when he joined Championship club Hull City on a two-year deal for an undisclosed fee.

In January 2024, Lokilo joined Primeira Liga club Vizela on loan for the remainder of the season.

=== CSKA Sofia ===
On 26 July 2024, Lokilo moved to CSKA Sofia for an undisclosed fee.

=== Piast Gliwice ===
On 27 August 2025, Lokilo signed for Polish club Piast Gliwice on a two-year deal, with an option for another year.

== International career ==
Lokilo was born in Belgium and is of Congolese descent. Lokilo debuted for the DR Congo U20 in an 8–0 friendly loss to the England U17s on 7 October 2015.

== Career statistics ==
As of match played 23 May 2026

Appearances and goals by club, season and competition
Club	Season	League			National cup (Note: Includes Coupe de France, FA Cup, Polish Cup, KNVB Cup, Taça de Portugal, Bulgarian Cup)		League cup (Note: Includes EFL Cup, Coupe de la Ligue)		Other		Total	
Club	Season	Division	Apps	Goals	Apps	Goals	Apps	Goals	Apps	Goals	Apps	Goals
Crystal Palace	2017–18	Premier League	0	0	0	0	1	0	—		1	0
Lorient (loan)	2018–19	Ligue 2	4	0	1	0	1	0	—		6	0
Doncaster Rovers (loan)	2019–20	League One	1	0	—		—		—		1	0
Doncaster Rovers	2020–21	League One	32	1	4	0	1	0	2 (Note: Appearances in the EFL Trophy)	0	39	1
Doncaster Rovers	Total		33	1	4	0	1	0	2	0	40	1
Górnik Łęczna	2021–22	Ekstraklasa	25	2	4	1	—		—		29	3
Sparta Rotterdam	2022–23	Eredivisie	7	0	1	0	0	0	—		8	0
İstanbulspor (loan)	2022–23	Süper Lig	16	4	—		—		0	0	16	4
Hull City	2023–24	Championship	18	0	2	1	1	0	—		21	1
Vizela	2023–24	Primeira Liga	10	1	1	0	0	0	—		11	1
CSKA Sofia	2024–25	Bulgarian First League	22	1	3	0	—		0	0	25	1
CSKA Sofia	2025–26	Bulgarian First League	2	0	—		—		0	0	2	0
CSKA Sofia	Total		24	1	3	0	0	0	2	0	27	1
Piast Gliwice	2025–26	Ekstraklasa	21	0	1	1	—		—		22	1
Career total			158	9	17	3	4	0	2	0	181	12
