= Simon Deli =

Ivorian footballer

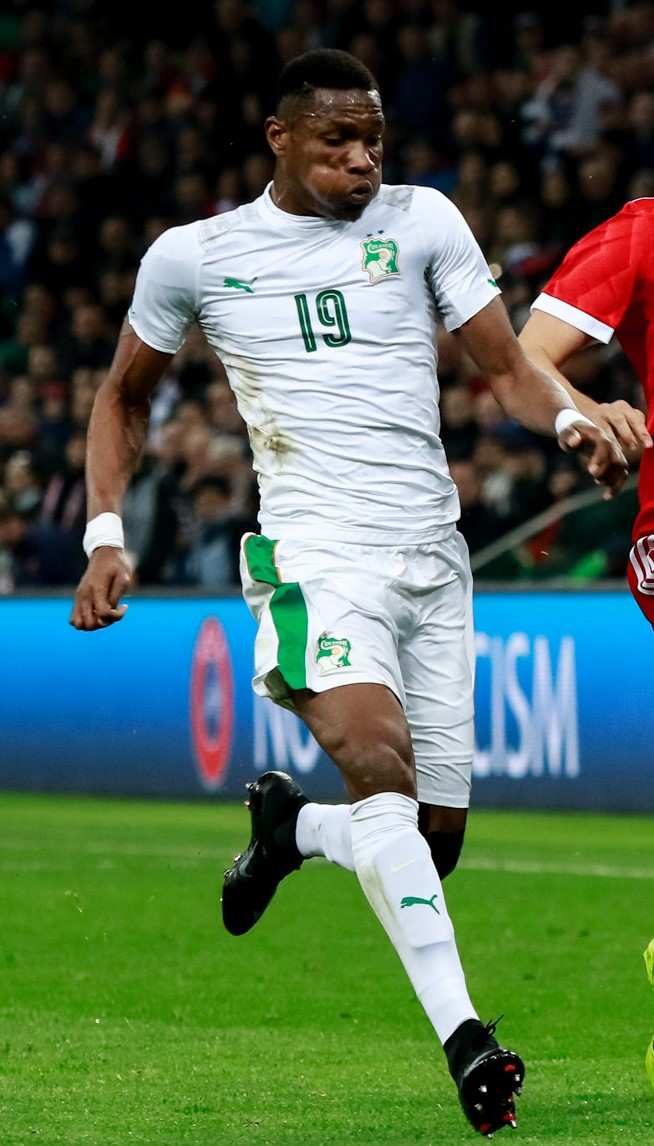
- Deli with Ivory Coast

Personal information
- Full name: Simon Désiré Sylvanus Deli
- Date of birth: 27 October 1991 (age 35)
- Place of birth: Abidjan, Ivory Coast
- Height: 1.92 m (6 ft 4 in)
- Position: Centre back

Youth career
- Africa Sports d'Abidjan

Senior career*
Years	Team	Apps	(Gls)
2010–2012	Africa Sports d'Abidjan		
2012–2015	Sparta Prague	0	(0)
2013–2014	→ České Budějovice (loan)	24	(1)
2014	→ Příbram (loan)	7	(0)
2015–2019	Slavia Prague	97	(3)
2019–2021	Club Brugge	39	(3)
2021	→ Slavia Prague (loan)	12	(0)
2021–2023	Adana Demirspor	19	(0)
2023	→ İstanbulspor (loan)	10	(0)
2023–2024	İstanbulspor	38	(0)
2024–2025	Asteras Tripolis	29	(0)
2025–2026	Slavia Prague B	7	(0)

International career^{‡}
2015–	Ivory Coast	26	(0)
- * Club domestic league appearances and goals as of 7 March 2026 ‡ National team caps and goals as of 10:27, 27 November 2023 (UTC)

Simon Désiré Sylvanus Deli (born 27 October 1991) is an Ivorian former professional footballer who last played as a centre back for Czech National Football League club Slavia Prague B and the Ivory Coast national team.

== Club career ==
=== Sparta Prague and loans ===
Deli signed for the Czech First League side Sparta Prague in 2012, but made no league appearances for the club. He gained competitive experience in the Czech league by playing on loan for České Budějovice in the second-tier Czech National Football League and in the First League for Příbram.

=== Slavia Prague ===
Deli moved from Sparta Prague to their rivals Slavia Prague, who were then struggling to avoid relegation, in January 2015. He quickly established himself in Slavia, playing in 66 out of their 74 league matches in his first three seasons. He won the 2016–17 Czech First League title with Slavia Prague, and was the runner-up for the Best Defender of the Year award. During that season, he did not receive a single yellow card. In June 2017, Deli extended his contract until June 2020.

=== Club Brugge ===
Deli joined Club Brugge KV on 10 July 2019, on a three-year contract until 2022.

On 1 February 2021, Deli returned former club Slavia Prague on a loan deal until the end of the season.

=== Adana Demirspor ===
Deli moved to Süper Lig club Adana Demirspor in August 2021, having agreed a three-year contract.

=== Slavia Prague B ===
On 11 July 2025, Deli signed a contract with Czech National Football League club Slavia Prague B.

== International career ==
Deli made his debut in the Ivory Coast national team in 2015, and went on to represent his country on the 2017 Africa Cup of Nations. He was subsequently called up for the 2021 Africa Cup of Nations, where he played all of his nation's matches.

== Career statistics ==
=== Club ===
As of 30 July 2024

Appearances and goals by club, season and competition
Club	Season	League			National cup		Continental		Other		Total	
Club	Season	Division	Apps	Goals	Apps	Goals	Apps	Goals	Apps	Goals	Apps	Goals
České Budějovice (loan)	2013–14	Czech National Football League	24	1	0	0	—		—		24	1
Příbram (loan)	2014–15	Czech First League	7	0	0	0	—		—		7	0
Slavia Prague	2014–15	Czech First League	13	0	0	0	—		—		13	0
Slavia Prague	2015–16	Czech First League	28	1	2	0	—		—		30	1
Slavia Prague	2016–17	Czech First League	25	1	1	0	5	0	—		31	1
Slavia Prague	2017–18	Czech First League	10	1	1	0	7	0	—		18	1
Slavia Prague	2018–19	Czech First League	21	0	4	0	11	0	—		36	0
Slavia Prague	Total		97	3	8	0	23	0	—		128	3
Club Brugge	2019–20	Belgian First Division A	26	2	5	0	12	1	—		43	3
Club Brugge	2020–21	Belgian First Division A	13	1	0	0	4	0	—		17	1
Club Brugge	Total		39	3	5	0	16	1	—		60	4
Slavia Prague (loan)	2020–21	Czech First League	12	0	3	0	1	0	—		16	0
Adana Demirspor	2021–22	Süper Lig	19	0	0	0	—		—		19	0
İstanbulspor (loan)	2022–23	Süper Lig	10	0	0	0	—		—		10	0
İstanbulspor	2023–24	Süper Lig	28	0	0	0	—		—		28	0
Career total			236	7	16	0	40	1	0	0	291	8

=== International ===
As of matches played on 27 November 2023

Appearances and goals by national team and year
National team	Year	Apps	Goals
Ivory Coast	2015	4	0
Ivory Coast	2016	0	0
Ivory Coast	2017	7	0
Ivory Coast	2018	1	0
Ivory Coast	2019	2	0
Ivory Coast	2020	1	0
Ivory Coast	2021	2	0
Ivory Coast	2022	8	0
Ivory Coast	2023	1	0
Total		26	0

== Honours ==
Slavia Prague

- Czech First League: 2016–17, 2018–19, 2020–21
- Czech Cup: 2017–18, 2018–19, 2020–21

Club Brugge

- Belgian First Division A: 2019–20
