= Hakan Yeşil =

Turkish footballer (born 2002)

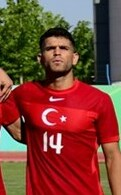
- Yeşil in 2022

Personal information
- Date of birth: 1 January 2002 (age 24)
- Place of birth: Ergani, Diyarbakır, Turkey
- Height: 1.81 m (5 ft 11 in)
- Position: Midfielder

Team information
- Current team: Pendikspor
- Number: 14

Youth career
- 2014: Ergani Gençlerbirliği
- 2014–2019: Trabzonspor

Senior career*
Years	Team	Apps	(Gls)
2019–2024	Trabzonspor	1	(0)
2019	→ 1461 Trabzon (loan)	1	(0)
2021–2022	→ 1461 Trabzon FK (loan)	31	(3)
2022–2023	→ Adanaspor (loan)	14	(1)
2023	→ Bodrumspor (loan)	5	(0)
2023–2024	→ 1461 Trabzon FK (loan)	33	(4)
2024–	Pendikspor	30	(1)
2024–2025	→ Kahramanmaraş İstiklalspor (loan)	28	(0)

International career^{‡}
2016	Turkey U14	6	(0)
2016–2017	Turkey U15	6	(0)
2017–2018	Turkey U16	10	(0)
2018–2019	Turkey U17	12	(0)
2019–2020	Turkey U18	11	(0)
2019	Turkey U19	3	(0)
2022–2023	Turkey U21	5	(0)
2022	Turkey U23	4	(0)
Medal record
Men's football
Representing Turkey
Islamic Solidarity Games
Gold medal – first place	2021 Konya
- * Club domestic league appearances and goals as of 5 May 2026 ‡ National team caps and goals as of 27 March 2023

Hakan Yeşil (born 1 January 2002) is a Turkish professional footballer who plays as a midfielder for TFF 1. Lig club Pendikspor.

== Career ==
Yeşil is a youth product of Trabzonspor's academy. He signed his first professional contract with the club in 2019. He went on a short loan to 1461 Trabzon in January 2019. He made his professional debut with Trabzonspor in a 2–1 Süper Lig win over Gençlerbirliği on 15 May 2021.

On 20 January 2023, Yeşil joined Bodrumspor on loan.

On 13 November 2025, Yeşil was banned from playing for 45 days for his involvement in the 2025 Turkish football betting scandal.

== International career ==
Yeşil is a youth international for Turkey, having represented their youth sides 48 times. He was appointed the captain of the Turkey U19s.

== Personal life ==
Yeşil is the cousin of the Turkish footballer Mehmet Yeşil.

== Honours ==
Turkey U23

- Islamic Solidarity Games: 2021
