= Hasan Kaya =

German footballer

Personal information
- Date of birth: 10 November 1995 (age 31)
- Place of birth: Hamburg, Germany
- Position: Forward

Team information
- Current team: Isparta 32 SK
- Number: 28

Youth career
- 2008–2013: Pursaklarspor
- 2013–2014: Ankaragücü

Senior career*
Years	Team	Apps	(Gls)
2014–2021	Ankaragücü	36	(3)
2015	→ Çubukspor (loan)	11	(1)
2017–2018	→ Ankara Demirspor (loan)	54	(6)
2018–2019	→ Yeni Orduspor (loan)	26	(9)
2020	→ 24 Erzincanspor (loan)	10	(3)
2020–2021	→ Nevşehir Belediyespor (loan)	15	(1)
2021	→ Ankara Demirspor (loan)	13	(5)
2021–2023	Ankara Demirspor	50	(5)
2023–2024	24 Erzincanspor	32	(2)
2024–2025	Erbaaspor	16	(2)
2025	Ankaraspor	13	(4)
2025–	Isparta 32 SK	12	(7)
- * Club domestic league appearances and goals as of 9 November 2025

Hasan Kaya (born 10 November 1995) is a German footballer who plays as a forward for Turkish TFF 2. Lig club Isparta 32 SK.

== Career ==
Kaya made his professional debut Ankaragücü with in a 1–1 Süper Lig tie with Kayserispor on 24 August 2019.
