= İbrahim Yılmaz =

Turkish footballer (born 1994)

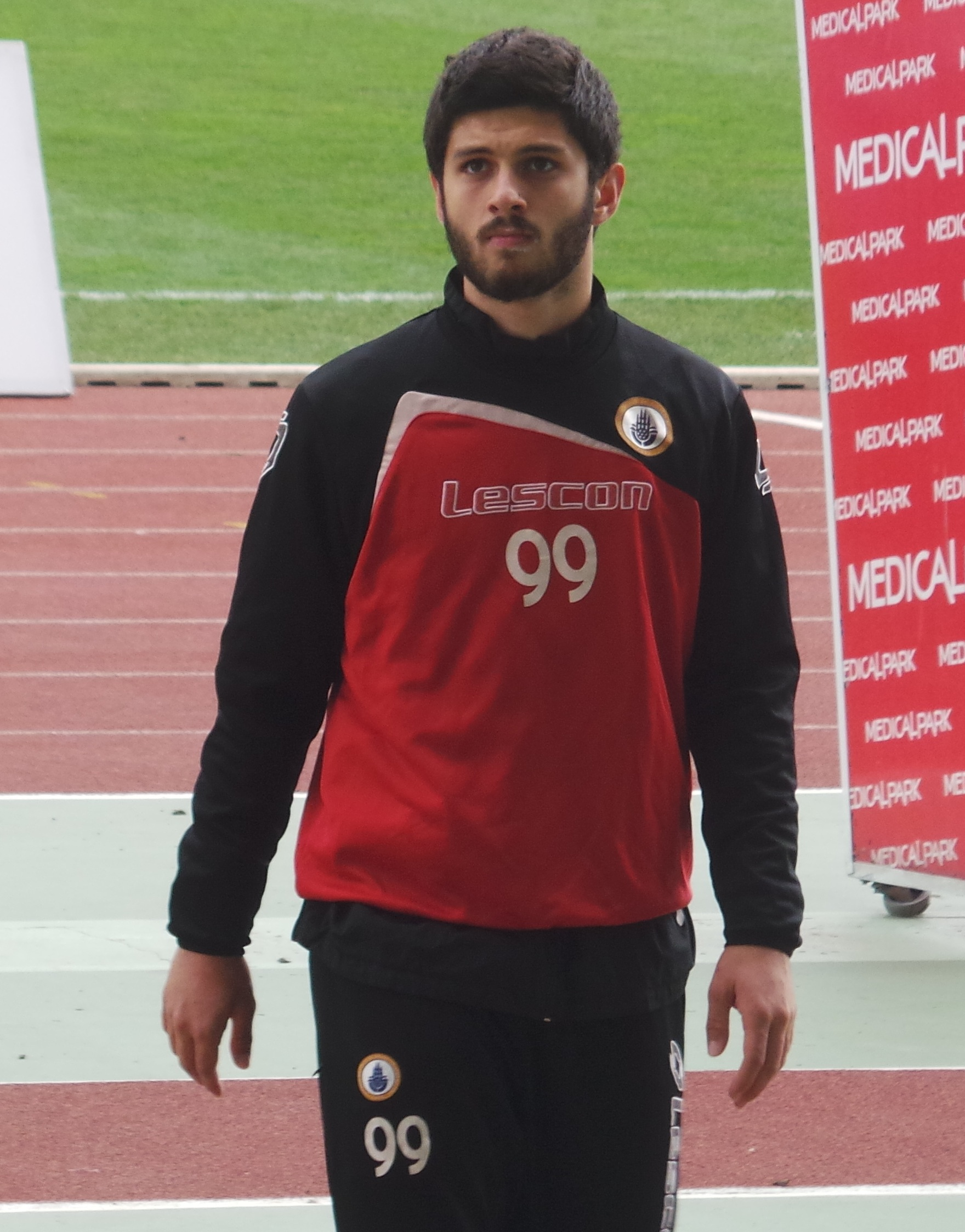

Personal information
- Full name: İbrahim Yılmaz
- Date of birth: 6 February 1994 (age 32)
- Place of birth: Fatih, Istanbul, Turkey
- Height: 1.84 m (6 ft 0 in)
- Position: Forward

Team information
- Current team: 52 Orduspor

Youth career
- 2005–2010: İstanbul B.B.

Senior career*
Years	Team	Apps	(Gls)
2010–2015	İstanbul B.B.	27	(6)
2012–2013	→ Darıca Gençlerbirliği (loan)	32	(20)
2014–2015	→ Altınordu (loan)	6	(0)
2015	→ Şanlıurfaspor (loan)	6	(1)
2015–2016	Darıca Gençlerbirliği	32	(12)
2016–2023	İstanbulspor	199	(50)
2023	→ Eyüpspor (loan)	10	(0)
2024	24 Erzincanspor	15	(4)
2024–2025	68 Aksarayspor	32	(13)
2025	Aliağa FK	9	(2)
2026–	52 Orduspor	0	(0)

International career
2009	Turkey U15	4	(0)
2009–2010	Turkey U16	13	(3)
2010–2011	Turkey U17	12	(5)
2011–2012	Turkey U18	4	(0)
2011–2013	Turkey U19	11	(4)
2012–2014	Turkey U20	15	(4)
- * Club domestic league appearances and goals as of 1 October 2026

İbrahim Yılmaz (born 6 February 1994) is a Turkish professional footballer who plays as a forward for TFF Second League club 52 Orduspor.

== Career ==
Yılmaz began his career with İstanbul Büyükşehir Belediyespor in 2005 and made his professional debut on 19 December 2010. He helped İstanbulspor achieve promotion in the 2021-22 season for the first time in 17 years. He started in İstanbulspor return to the Süper Lig in a 2–0 season opening loss to Trabzonspor on 5 August 2022.

On 12 January 2023, Yılmaz was loaned by Eyüpspor.

=== International career ===
Yılmaz represented Turkey at the 2013 UEFA U-19 Championship and 2013 FIFA U-20 World Cup.

== Career statistics ==
=== Club ===
As of 5 December 2023

Appearances and goals by club, season and competition
Club	Season	League			National Cup		Total	
Club	Season	Division	Apps	Goals	Apps	Goals	Apps	Goals
İstanbul BB	2010–11	Süper Lig	5	0	3	0	8	0
İstanbul BB	2011–12	Süper Lig	4	0	0	0	4	0
İstanbul BB	2013–14	1.Lig	18	6	2	1	20	7
İstanbul BB	Total		27	6	5	1	32	7
Darıca Gençlerbirliği (loan)	2012–13	3.Lig	34	20	2	1	36	21
Altınordu (loan)	2014–15	1.Lig	6	0	4	0	10	0
Şanlıurfaspor (loan)	2014–15	1.Lig	6	1	0	0	6	1
Darıca Gençlerbirliği	2015–16	3.Lig	32	12	0	0	32	12
İstanbulspor	2016–17	2.Lig	27	7	1	0	28	7
İstanbulspor	2017–18	1.Lig	28	3	5	0	33	3
İstanbulspor	2018–19	1.Lig	33	11	1	1	34	12
İstanbulspor	2019–20	1.Lig	21	2	1	2	22	4
İstanbulspor	2020–21	1.Lig	34	9	0	0	34	9
İstanbulspor	2021–22	1.Lig	37	18	0	0	37	18
İstanbulspor	2022–23	Süper Lig	17	0	2	0	19	0
İstanbulspor	2023–24	Süper Lig	8	2	0	0	8	2
İstanbulspor	Total		205	52	10	3	215	55
Eyüpspor (loan)	2022–23	1.Lig	10	0	0	0	10	0
Career total			320	91	21	5	341	96
