= Oğuzhan Berber =

Turkish footballer (born 1992)

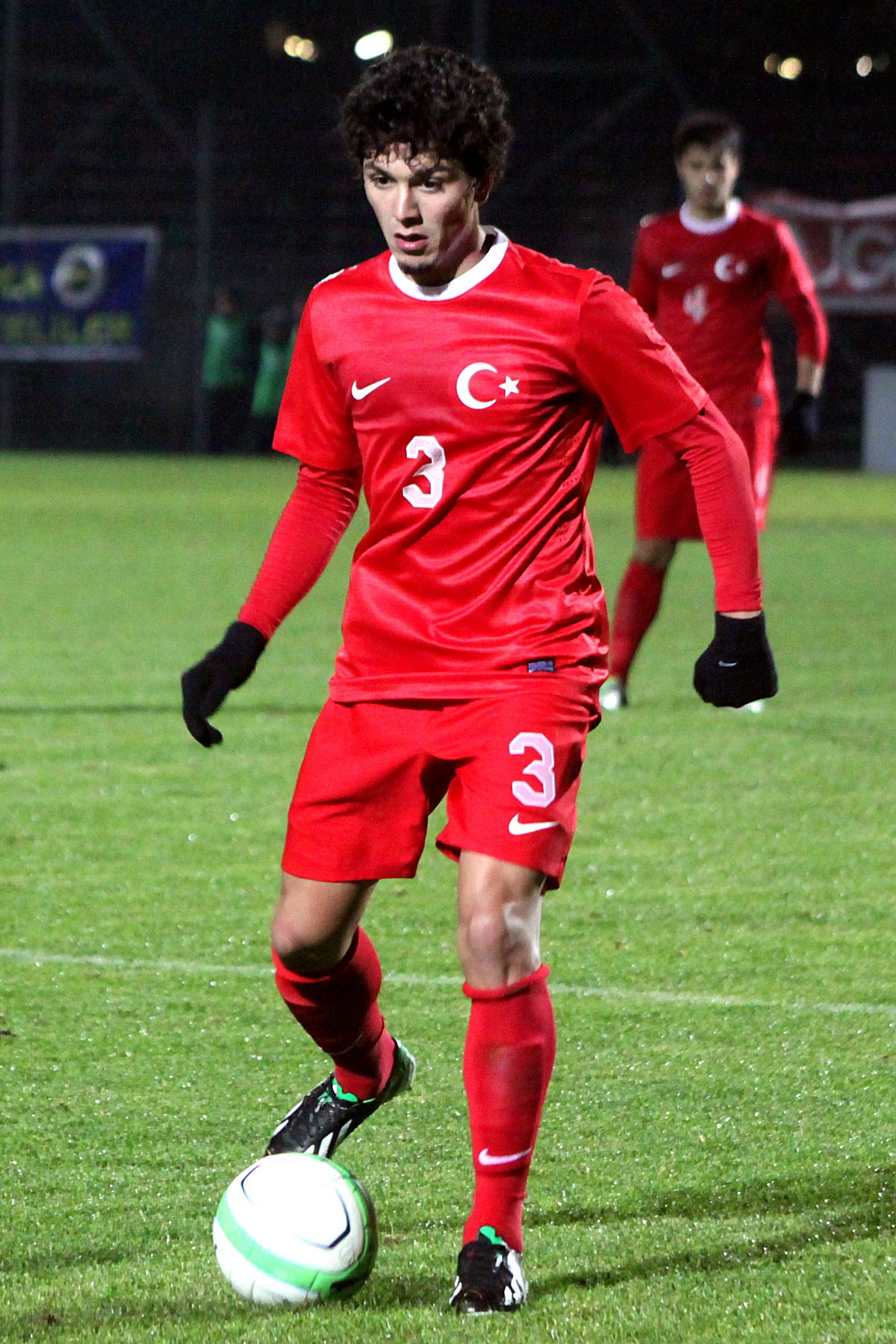

Personal information
- Date of birth: 10 April 1992 (age 34)
- Place of birth: Konak, Turkey
- Height: 1.76 m (5 ft 9 in)
- Position: Left-back

Team information
- Current team: Sarıyer
- Number: 13

Youth career
- 2004–2005: Karşıyaka
- 2005–2011: Denizlispor

Senior career*
Years	Team	Apps	(Gls)
2011–2013	Denizlispor	21	(0)
2011–2012	→ Sarayköy (loan)	27	(1)
2013–2016	Çaykur Rizespor	20	(0)
2014	→ Adana Demirspor (loan)	13	(0)
2015	→ Altınordu (loan)	3	(0)
2015–2016	→ Samsunspor (loan)	34	(0)
2016–2017	Adana Demirspor	31	(0)
2017–2019	Kayserispor	0	(0)
2017–2018	→ İstanbulspor (loan)	27	(0)
2019–2020	İstanbulspor	21	(0)
2020–2021	Boluspor	23	(0)
2021–2023	İstanbulspor	51	(0)
2023–2024	Manisa	11	(0)
2024–2025	Gençlerbirliği	43	(0)
2025–	Sarıyer	18	(0)

International career^{‡}
2012–2014	Turkey U21	9	(0)
2015	Turkey A2	1	(0)
- * Club domestic league appearances and goals as of 6 May 2026 ‡ National team caps and goals as of 23:02, 5 August 2022 (UTC)

Oğuzhan Berber (born 10 April 1992) is a Turkish professional footballer who plays as a left-back for TFF 1. Lig club Sarıyer.

== Professional career ==
Berber is a product of the youth academies of Karşıyaka and Denizlispor, and began his senior career with Denizlispor in 2011. He shortly after went on loan to Sarayköy until the end of the 2011-12 season. He transferred to Çaykur Rizespor in 2013. He made his professional debut with Rizespor in a 1-1 Süper Lig tie with Kayseri Erciyesspor on 2 November 2014. From Rizespor, he had successive loans at Adana Demirspor, Altınordu and Samsunspor, before a short stint with in 2016.

On 16 June 2017 Berber signed with Kayserispor. He joined İstanbulspor on loan in 2017, and after good performances with them was signed permanently in 2018. He had a short stint with Boluspor for the 2020-21 season, before returning to İstanbulspor. He helped İstanbulspor achieve promotion in the 2021-22 season for the first time in 17 years. He started in İstanbulspor return to the Süper Lig in a 2–0 season opening loss to Trabzonspor on 5 August 2022.

== International career ==
Berber is a youth international for Turkey, having played for the Turkey U21 and A2 teams.
