= Duhan Aksu =

Turkish footballer (born 1997)

Personal information
- Full name: Tuncer Duhan Aksu
- Date of birth: 11 September 1997 (age 29)
- Place of birth: Ankara, Turkey
- Height: 1.83 m (6 ft 0 in)
- Position: Left-back

Team information
- Current team: Ankara Keçiörengücü
- Number: 37

Youth career
- 2006–2017: Fenerbahçe
- 2017–2018: İstanbulspor

Senior career*
Years	Team	Apps	(Gls)
2018–2023	İstanbulspor	96	(0)
2023	Kasımpaşa	13	(0)
2024	Kocaelispor	9	(0)
2024–2026	İstanbulspor	31	(0)
2026–	Ankara Keçiörengücü	5	(0)

International career^{‡}
2013	Turkey U16	2	(0)
2018	Turkey U20	1	(0)
- * Club domestic league appearances and goals as of 30 October 2026 ‡ National team caps and goals as of 21:37, 5 August 2022 (UTC)

Tuncer Duhan Aksu (born 11 September 1997) is a Turkish professional footballer who plays as a left-back for TFF 1. Lig club Ankara Keçiörengücü.

== Career ==
Aksu is a product of the youth academy of Fenerbahçe, and moved to İstanbulspor youth sides in 2017. In 2018 he was promoted to their senior team and debuted in the TFF First League. He controversially signed a pre-agreement with Lille OSC in 2018, that was cancelled as a hidden payment from Lille to İstanbulspor for the transfer Zeki Çelik. In January 2021, he had arthroscopic hip surgery that kept him off the field for 3 months. He helped İstanbulspor achieve promotion in the 2021-22 season for the first time in 17 years. He made his professional debut with İstanbulspor in a 2–0 Süper Lig loss to Trabzonspor on 5 August 2022.

On 15 July 2023, he signed with Süper Lig club Kasımpaşa.

== International career ==
Aksu is a youth international for Turkey, having played for the Turkey U16s and U20s.
