= Florian Loshaj =

Kosovo footballer

Personal information
- Date of birth: 13 August 1996 (age 30)
- Place of birth: Skenderaj, FR Yugoslavia
- Height: 1.74 m (5 ft 9 in)
- Position: Midfielder

Team information
- Current team: Bodrumspor
- Number: 14

Youth career
- –2016: Genk

Senior career*
Years	Team	Apps	(Gls)
2016	Genk	0	(0)
2016	→ MVV Maastricht (loan)	4	(0)
2016–2018	MVV Maastricht	47	(2)
2019	Roda JC	9	(0)
2019–2020	Politehnica Iași	19	(3)
2020–2023	Cracovia	71	(4)
2023–2026	İstanbulspor	96	(14)
2026	Iğdır	13	(2)
2026–	Bodrumspor	10	(1)

International career
2017	Kosovo U21	3	(0)
2020–2024	Kosovo	24	(0)
- * Club domestic league appearances and goals as of 17 October 2026

Florian Loshaj (born 13 August 1996) is a Kosovar professional footballer who plays as a midfielder for Turkish TFF 1. Lig club Bodrumspor.

== Club career ==
=== Early career ===
Loshaj finished his youth career at Belgium club Genk in the summer of 2016. On 1 February 2016, he moved to Dutch Eerste Divisie side MVV Maastricht. On 11 April 2016, Loshaj made his debut for Maastricht in a league match against Fortuna Sittard, after coming on as a substitute in the 90th minute, in place of Jordy Croux.

=== Politehnica Iași ===
On 23 June 2019, Loshaj joined Liga I side Politehnica Iași, on a three-year contract. On 13 July 2019, he made his debut against CFR Cluj after being named in the starting line-up and scored his side's only goal during a 1–1 away draw.

=== Cracovia ===
On 15 January 2020, Loshaj joined Ekstraklasa side Cracovia, on a three-year contract. On 7 February 2020, he made his debut in a 1–0 away win against Arka Gdynia after being named in the starting line-up.

== International career ==
=== Under-21 ===
On 29 August 2017, Loshaj received a call-up from Kosovo U21 for a 2019 UEFA European Under-21 Championship qualification matches against Norway U21 and Germany U21 On 1 September 2017, he made his debut with Kosovo U21 in a 2019 UEFA European Under-21 Championship qualification against Norway U21 after coming on as a substitute at 59th minute in place of Kamer Krasniqi.

=== Senior ===
On 24 December 2019, Loshaj received a call-up from Kosovo for the friendly match against Sweden and made his debut after being named in the starting line-up.

== Personal life ==
Loshaj was born in Skenderaj, FR Yugoslavia from Kosovo Albanian parents.

== Career statistics ==
=== Club ===
As of 26 November 2022

Appearances and goals by club, season and competition
Club	Season	League			National cup (Note: Includes KNVB Cup, Cupa României, Polish Cup)		Continental		Other		Total	
Club	Season	Division	Apps	Goals	Apps	Goals	Apps	Goals	Apps	Goals	Apps	Goals
MVV Maastricht (loan)	2015–16	Eerste Divisie	4	0	0	0	—		4 (Note: Appearance(s) in Eerste Divisie play-offs)	0	8	0
MVV Maastricht	2016–17	Eerste Divisie	24	1	1	0	—		—		25	1
MVV Maastricht	2017–18	Eerste Divisie	23	1	1	0	—		1	0	25	1
MVV Maastricht	Total		47	2	2	0	—		1	0	50	2
Roda JC	2018–19	Eerste Divisie	9	0	0	0	—		—		9	0
Politehnica Iași	2019–20	Liga I	19	3	2	0	—		—		21	3
Cracovia	2019–20	Ekstraklasa	12	0	2	0	—		—		14	0
Cracovia	2020–21	Ekstraklasa	23	2	4	0	1 (Note: Appearance in UEFA Europa League)	0	0	0	28	2
Cracovia	2021–22	Ekstraklasa	21	1	1	0	—		—		22	1
Cracovia	2022–23	Ekstraklasa	15	1	1	0	—		—		16	1
Cracovia	Total		71	4	8	0	1	0	—		80	4
Career total			150	9	12	0	1	0	5	0	168	9

=== International ===
Appearances and goals by national team and year
National team	Year	Apps	Goals
Kosovo	2020	2	0
Kosovo	2021	9	0
Kosovo	2022	6	0
Kosovo	2023	5	0
Kosovo	2024	2	0
Total		24	0

== Honours ==
Cracovia

- Polish Cup: 2019–20
