= Abdullah Dıjlan Aydın =

Turkish footballer (born 2000)

Personal information
- Date of birth: 16 June 2000 (age 26)
- Place of birth: Çınar, Turkey
- Height: 1.83 m (6 ft 0 in)
- Position: Midfielder

Team information
- Current team: İstanbulspor
- Number: 11

Youth career
- 2011–2014: Galatasaray
- 2014–2017: Beylerbeyi
- 2017–2019: İstanbulspor

Senior career*
| Years | Team | Apps | (Gls) |
| 2019– | İstanbulspor | 55 | (3) |
| 2020–2021 | → Karacabey Belediyespor (loan) | 25 | (2) |
| 2021–2022 | → Karacabey Belediyespor (loan) | 23 | (1) |
| 2023 | → Karacabey Belediyespor (loan) | 12 | (1) |
| 2023–2024 | → Amedspor (loan) | 25 | (1) |
- * Club domestic league appearances and goals as of 6 May 2026

Abdullah Dıjlan Aydın (born 16 June 2000) is a Turkish professional footballer who plays as a midfielder for TFF 1. Lig club İstanbulspor.

== Career ==
Aydın is a youth product of Galatasaray, Beylerbeyi, and İstanbulspor. He signed his first professional contract with İstanbulspor in 2019 where he was assigned to their reserves. He joined Karacabey Belediyespor on 2 consecutive loans from 2020 to 2022 in the TFF Second League. Returning to İstanbulspor for the 2022–23 season as they were newly promoted to the Süper Lig, he made his debut with them in a 1–0 league win over Alanyaspor on 27 August 2022.

On 20 January 2023, Aydın returned to Karacabey Belediyespor for his third loan.

On 13 November 2025, Aydın was banned from playing for 45 days for his involvement in the 2025 Turkish football betting scandal.
