= Michael Ologo =

Nigerian footballer (born 2003)

Personal information
- Full name: Michael Ologo Inainfe
- Date of birth: 5 April 2003 (age 23)
- Place of birth: Ologoama, Nigeria
- Height: 1.89 m (6 ft 2 in)
- Position: Centre-back

Team information
- Current team: Velež (on loan from İstanbulspor)
- Number: 4

Youth career
- 2018–2021: Fresh Talents

Senior career*
Years	Team	Apps	(Gls)
2021–	İstanbulspor	51	(1)
2023–2024	→ Çorum (loan)	27	(1)
2025–2026	→ Velež (loan)	10	(0)

International career^{‡}
2022–	Nigeria U23	2	(0)
- * Club domestic league appearances and goals as of 8 February 2026 ‡ National team caps and goals as of 21:00, 25 December 2022 (UTC)

Michael Ologo Inainfe (born 5 April 2003) is a Nigerian professional footballer who plays as a centre-back for TFF First League club İstanbulspor.

== Career ==
A youth product of the Nigerian club Fresh Talents Football Academy since 2018, Ologo moved to the TFF First League clubİstanbulspor in the summer of 2018 in a complicated transfer. On his debut season with the club, he helped them earn promotion into the Süper Lig after winning the promotion playoffs. On 8 August 2022, he extended his contract with the club until 2026.

== International career ==
Ologo is a youth international for Nigeria, having played for the Nigeria U23s in October 2022.
