= Okan Erdoğan =

German footballer

Personal information
- Date of birth: 29 September 1998 (age 28)
- Place of birth: Bremen, Germany
- Height: 1.85 m (6 ft 1 in)
- Position: Centre-back

Team information
- Current team: Sivasspor
- Number: 3

Youth career
- SC Weyhe
- –2016: Blumenthaler SV
- 2016–2017: JFV Nordwest

Senior career*
Years	Team	Apps	(Gls)
2017–2019	VfB Oldenburg	59	(3)
2019–2021	Preußen Münster	60	(0)
2021–2025	İstanbulspor	112	(5)
2025–	Sivasspor	28	(1)
- * Club domestic league appearances and goals as of 6 May 2026

Okan Erdoğan (born 29 September 1998) is a German professional footballer who plays a centre-back for Turkish TFF 1. Lig club Sivasspor.

== Career ==
Erdoğan made his professional debut for Preußen Münster in the 3. Liga on 31 July 2019, coming on as a substitute in the 66th minute for Nico Brandenburger in the 2–0 away loss against MSV Duisburg.
