= Muammer Sarıkaya =

Turkish footballer (born 1998)

Personal information
- Date of birth: 9 February 1998 (age 28)
- Place of birth: Istanbul, Turkey
- Height: 1.79 m (5 ft 10 in)
- Position: Central midfielder

Team information
- Current team: Aliağa FK
- Number: 24

Youth career
- 2012–2013: Bakırköyspor
- 2013–2015: İstanbulspor

Senior career*
Years	Team	Apps	(Gls)
2015–2025	İstanbulspor	118	(12)
2016–2017	→ Ofspor (loan)	9	(1)
2018–2019	→ Başkent Gözgözler (loan)	14	(0)
2019–2020	→ Zonguldak Kömürspor (loan)	26	(3)
2020–2021	→ Esenler Erokspor (loan)	32	(6)
2024	→ Çaykur Rizespor (loan)	13	(0)
2025	→ Iğdır (loan)	16	(3)
2025–	Aliağa FK	30	(10)
- * Club domestic league appearances and goals as of 1 October 2026

Muammer Sarıkaya (born 9 February 1998) is a Turkish professional footballer who plays as a central midfielder for TFF 2. Lig club Aliağa FK.

== Career ==
Sarıkaya is a youth product of the academies of Bakırköyspor and İstanbulspor. He began his senior career with İstanbulspor, signing a professional contract on 25 August 2015. He had successive loans to Ofspor, Başkent Gözgözler, Zonguldak Kömürspor and Esenler Erokspor to start his career, before returning to İstanbulspor. He helped İstanbulspor achieve promotion in the 2021–22 season for the first time in 17 years. He made his professional debut in İstanbulspor's return to the Süper Lig in a 2–0 season opening loss to Trabzonspor on 5 August 2022.

On 8 February 2024, Sarıkaya was loaned by Çaykur Rizespor.
