= Ali Yaşar =

Belgian footballer

Personal information
- Date of birth: 8 March 1995 (age 31)
- Place of birth: Liège, Belgium
- Height: 1.80 m (5 ft 11 in)
- Position: Left back

Team information
- Current team: Ümraniyespor
- Number: 66

Youth career
- 2008–2014: Standard Liège

Senior career*
Years	Team	Apps	(Gls)
2014–2016	Standard Liège	1	(0)
2016–2017	Roda JC Kerkrade U21	16	(2)
2017–2018	Anadolu Selçukspor	31	(3)
2018–2020	Konyaspor	3	(0)
2018–2019	→ Altınordu (loan)	11	(0)
2020	→ Altınordu (loan)	11	(0)
2020–2025	İstanbulspor	140	(6)
2025–2026	Iğdır	25	(0)
2026–	Ümraniyespor	6	(0)

International career^{‡}
2010	Belgium U15	1	(0)
2011–2012	Belgium U17	5	(0)
2012–2013	Belgium U18	8	(0)
2014	Belgium U19	4	(0)
- * Club domestic league appearances and goals as of 24 October 2026 ‡ National team caps and goals as of 21:14, 5 August 2022 (UTC)

Ali Yaşar (born 8 March 1995) is a Belgian footballer who plays as a left back for Turkish TFF 1. Lig club Ümraniyespor.

== Club career ==
Yaşar is a youth exponent from Standard Liège. At 2 August 2014, he made his Belgian Pro League debut with Standard Liège against K.V. Kortrijk in a 2–3 away win. He played the first 45 minutes of the game, before being substituted by Jelle Van Damme. On 30 January 2016, he moved to Roda where he initially played for their U21 side. After a brief stint with Anadolu Selçukspor, he moved to Konyaspor in 2018 and immediately went on loan to Altınordu in the TFF First League. He returned to Altınordu on another loan in January 2020. He moved to İstanbulspor on 24 August 2020 in the TFF First League, and in the 2021–22 season helped them achieve promotion into the Süper Lig.

== International career ==
Born in Belgium, Yaşar is of Turkish descent. He is a youth international for Belgium, having represented them until the U19s.
