= Esenyurt Necmi Kadıoğlu Stadium =

Football stadium in Istanbul, Turkey

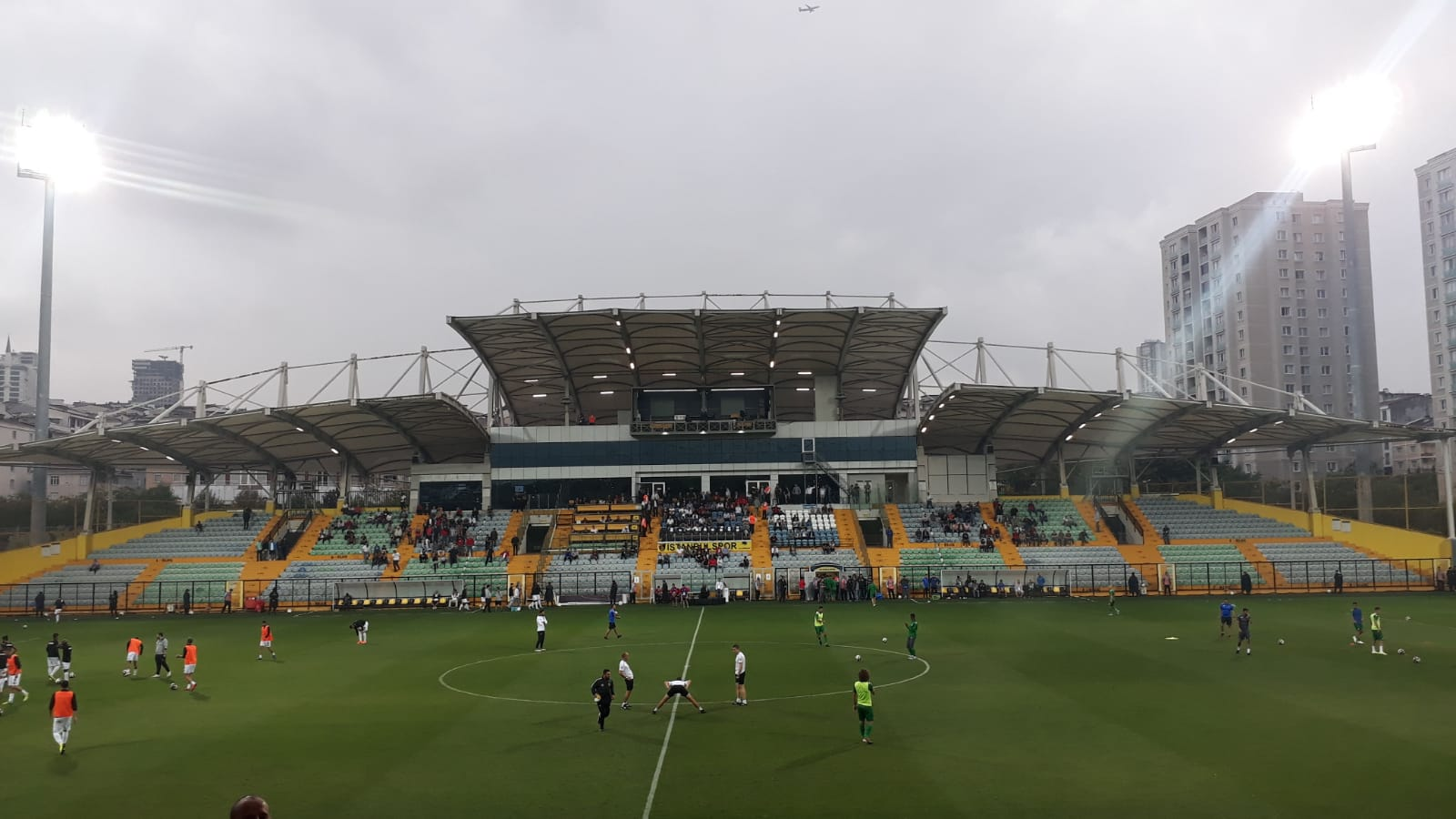
- Esenyurt Necmi Kadıoğlu Stadium
- Interactive map of Esenyurt Necmi Kadıoğlu Stadium
- Address: Yunus Emre Mah., OkurlarCad. 270. Sok. Esenyurt, Istanbul; Turkey
- Location: Esenyurt, Istanbul, Turkey
- Coordinates: 41°01′28″N 28°41′52″E
- Owner: Esenyurt Municipality
- Operator: İstanbulspor
- Capacity: 4,488
- Surface: Grass
- Public transit: City bus (İETT) 142K

Construction
- Opened: 23 April 2012; 14 years ago

Esenyurt Necmi Kadıoğlu Stadium is a football stadium in Esenyurt district in Istanbul, Turkey. It was named after Necmi Kadıoğlu, who served as the district mayor of Esenyurt from 2004 until 2017.

Located at Yunus Emre Mah., OkurlarCad. 270. Sok. in Esenyurt district in Istanbul, The venue is served by the city bus (İETT) line 142K (Esenyurt-Kiptaş-4. Etap-Avcılar-Metrobüs).

it was opened as the second football stadium in Esenyurt on 23 April 2012. It has a seating capacity of 4,488. The grass pitch has the dimensions 68 m × 105 m (223 ft × 344 ft), and is floodlit. It is home to İstanbulspor from 2018 on. Fatih Karagümrük S.K., which was promoted to the Süper Lig, play some of their home matches in this venue.

The venue hosted the 2023 FIFA Women's World Cup qualification match of Turkey against Bulgaria on 21 October 2021.

On 19 September 2024, the 2024–25 UEFA Women's Champions League qualifying Round 2 match between Galatasaray and Slavia Prague took place.
