= Emir Kaan Gültekin =

Turkish footballer (born 2000)

Personal information
- Date of birth: 2 October 2000 (age 26)
- Place of birth: Erdemli, Turkey
- Height: 1.81 m (5 ft 11 in)
- Position: Winger

Team information
- Current team: Bursaspor
- Number: 9

Youth career
- 2011–2014: Erdemli Gençlerbirliği
- 2014–2015: Erdemli Belediyespor
- 2015–2017: Mersin İdman Yurdu

Senior career*
Years	Team	Apps	(Gls)
2017–2018	Mersin İdman Yurdu	27	(2)
2018–2020	Tarsus İdman Yurdu	9	(0)
2020–2026	İstanbulspor	143	(28)
2020–2021	→ Isparta 32 (loan)	34	(19)
2026-	Bursaspor	1	(0)
- * Club domestic league appearances and goals as of 10 February 2026

Emir Kaan Gültekin (born 2 October 2000) is a Turkish professional footballer who plays as a winger for TFF 1. Lig club Bursaspor.

== Career ==
Gültekin is a product of the youth academies of Erdemli Gençlerbirliği, Erdemli Belediyespor and Mersin İdman Yurdu. He began his senior career with Mersin in 2017, and moved to Tarsus İdman Yurdu in 2018. He transferred to İstanbulspor in August 2020, and immediately went on loan to Isparta 32 for the 2020–21 season where became the top scorer in the TFF Third League with 19 goals in 34 games. He helped İstanbulspor achieve promotion in the 2021–22 season for the first time in 17 years. He made his professional debut in İstanbulspor's return to the Süper Lig in a 2–0 season opening loss to Trabzonspor on 5 August 2022.
