= Mehmet Yeşil =

Kurdish footballer (born 1998)

Personal information
- Date of birth: 31 May 1998 (age 28)
- Place of birth: Diyarbakır, Turkey
- Height: 1.88 m (6 ft 2 in)
- Position: Centre-back

Team information
- Current team: Amedspor
- Number: 21

Youth career
- 2010–2012: Erganispor
- 2012–2016: Trabzonspor

Senior career*
Years	Team	Apps	(Gls)
2016	Trabzonspor	1	(0)
2016–2024	İstanbulspor	119	(3)
2019	→ Ofspor (loan)	16	(1)
2024–	Amedspor	63	(5)

International career^{‡}
2015	Turkey U18	5	(0)
2016	Turkey U19	1	(0)
- * Club domestic league appearances and goals as of 5 May 2026 ‡ National team caps and goals as of 21:37, 5 August 2022 (UTC)

Mehmet Yeşil (born 31 May 1998) is a Turkish professional footballer who plays as a centre-back for TFF 1. Lig club Amedspor.

== Career ==
Yeşil is a youth product of the academies of Erganispor and Trabzonspor, and was promoted to the latter's senior team in 2016. He made his professional debut with Trabzonspor in a 6–0 Süper Lig loss to Kasımpaşa on 19 May 2016. In the summer of 2016, he transferred to İstanbulspor in the TFF First League. He joined Ofspor on loan in January 2019. He helped İstanbulspor achieve promotion in the 2021-22 season for the first time in 17 years. He started in İstanbulspor's return to the Süper Lig in a 2–0 season opening loss to Trabzonspor on 5 August 2022.

== International career ==
Yeşil is a youth international for Turkey, having played for the Turkey U18s and U19s.

== Personal life ==
Yeşil is the cousin of the Turkish footballer Hakan Yeşil.
