= Osman Zeki Korkmaz =

Turkish football manager (born 1982)

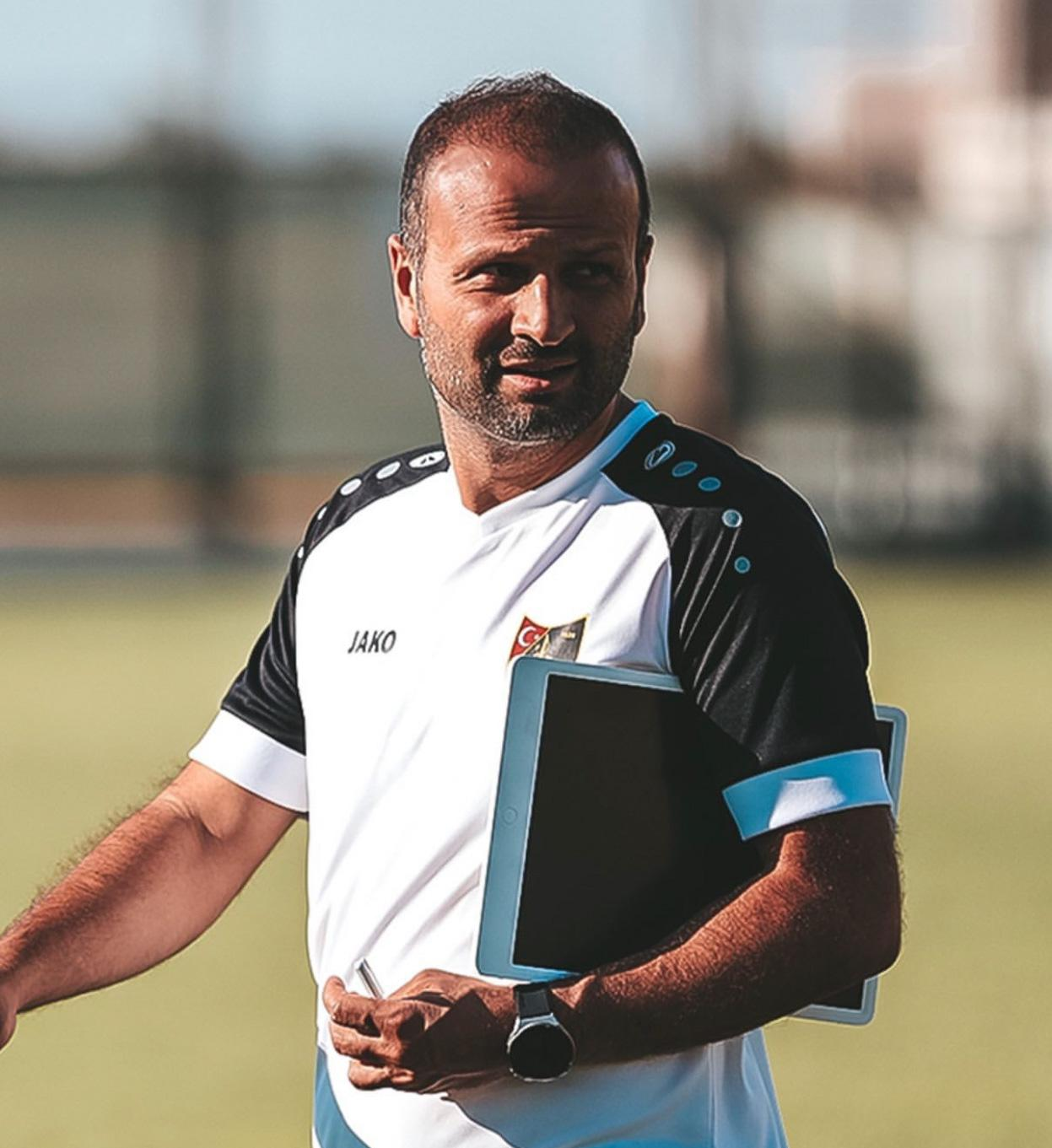

Personal information
- Date of birth: 2 May 1982 (age 44)
- Place of birth: Trabzon, Turkey

Team information
- Current team: Keçiörengücü (head coach)

Managerial career
- Years: Team
- 2006–2008: Fenerbahçe (youth)
- 2010–2011: İskenderun (youth)
- 2011–2013: Kartalspor (assistant)
- 2013–2014: Samsunspor (assistant)
- 2014–2014: Kahramanmaraşspor (assistant)
- 2014–2014: Boluspor (assistant)
- 2014–2015: Yeni Amasyaspor
- 2015–2015: Boluspor (assistant)
- 2015–2016: Eskişehirspor (assistant)
- 2016–2017: Gaziantep FK (assistant)
- 2017–2019: Ankaragücü (assistant)
- 2019–2020: Çaykur Rizespor (assistant)
- 2020–2021: Konyaspor (assistant)
- 2021–2022: İstanbulspor
- 2024–2025: İstanbulspor
- 2025: Sivasspor
- 2025–2026: Vanspor
- 2026–: Keçiörengücü

Osman Zeki Korkmaz (born 2 May 1982) is a Turkish football manager who is the head coach of TFF 1. Lig club Keçiörengücü.

== Managerial career ==
Korkmaz first began coaching with youth sides with Fenerbahçe in 2006, and left to become an assistant manager in 2009. He was assistant manager with the clubs Konyaspor, Çaykur Rizespor, Gaziantepspor, Ankaragücü, and Eskişehirspor amongst others. He helped Ankaragücü win the TFF First League and earn promotion to the Süper Lig.

He first acted as manager with Yeni Amasyaspor in the 2014-15 season. He was appointed as the assistant for İsmail Kartal in the Süper Lig with Ankaragücü from 2016 to 2017.

Korkmaz was named as the manager for İstanbulspor in the TFF First League on 23 August 2021. In his first season coaching, he helped İstanbulspor finish in fourth place earning a playoff spot; they defeated Bandırmaspor in the playoff final promoting İstanbulspor to the Süper Lig for the first time in 17 years. On 9 June 2022, he extended his contract with the club until 2025.
