= Muhammed Enes Durmuş =

Turkish footballer (born 1997)

Personal information
- Date of birth: 8 January 1997 (age 29)
- Place of birth: Zonguldak, Turkey
- Height: 1.78 m (5 ft 10 in)
- Position: Midfielder

Team information
- Current team: Beykoz Anadolu
- Number: 17

Youth career
- 2007–2009: Fenerspor
- 2009–2010: Fenerbahçe
- 2010–2011: Zonguldak Sarayspor
- 2011–2014: Kardemir Karabükspor
- 2014–2017: Beşiktaş

Senior career*
| Years | Team | Apps | (Gls) |
| 2017–2019 | Göztepe | 5 | (0) |
| 2018–2019 | → Gazişehir Gaziantep (loan) | 6 | (0) |
| 2019–2024 | İstanbulspor | 47 | (3) |
| 2021 | → Balıkesirspor (loan) | 16 | (1) |
| 2021–2022 | → Şanlıurfaspor (loan) | 32 | (5) |
| 2022–2023 | → İskenderunspor (loan) | 16 | (1) |
| 2023 | → Kastamonuspor 1966 (loan) | 7 | (0) |
| 2023–2024 | → Amed (loan) | 31 | (2) |
| 2024– | Beykoz Anadolu | 38 | (2) |

International career^{‡}
| 2015 | Turkey U19 | 2 | (0) |
| 2017 | Turkey U21 | 2 | (0) |
| 2018 | Turkey U20 | 2 | (0) |
- * Club domestic league appearances and goals as of 30 November 2025 ‡ National team caps and goals as of 07:53, 31 December 2021 (UTC)

Muhammed Enes Durmuş (born 8 January 1997) is a Turkish professional footballer who plays as a midfielder for TFF 2. Lig club Beykoz Anadolu.

== Professional career ==
Muhammed Enes transferred to Göztepe in July 2017 from the Beşiktaş academy. He made his professional debut for Göztepe in a 1-0 Süper Lig loss to Kayserispor on 20 August 2017.
