= Kağan Bağış =

Turkish footballer (born 1998)

Personal information
- Full name: Kağan Miray Bağış
- Date of birth: 10 April 1998 (age 28)
- Place of birth: Kayseri, Turkey
- Height: 1.78 m (5 ft 10 in)
- Position: Winger

Team information
- Current team: Kırşehir Futbol SK

Youth career
- Manisaspor

Senior career*
Years	Team	Apps	(Gls)
2016–2018	Manisaspor	22	(1)
2017	→ Bodrumspor (loan)	5	(0)
2018–2019	Giresunspor	18	(1)
2019–2024	İstanbulspor	45	(1)
2023	→ Yeni Mersin İdmanyurdu (loan)	15	(2)
2024–	Kırşehir Futbol SK	1	(0)
- * Club domestic league appearances and goals as of 11 February 2024

Kağan Miray Bağış (born 10 April 1998) is a Turkish professional footballer who plays as a winger for TFF Second League club Kırşehir Futbol SK.

== Career ==
Bağış began his senior career with Manisaspor in 2016. He joined Bodrumspor on loan on 1 February 2017. He transferred to İstanbulspor on 8 May 2019, signing a 5-year contract. He helped İstanbulspor achieve promotion in the 2021–22 season for the first time in 17 years. He made his professional debut in İstanbulspor's return to the Süper Lig in a 2–0 season opening loss to Trabzonspor on 5 August 2022.
