= 52 Orduspor =

Association football club in Turkey

- Full name: 52 Orduspor Futbol Kulübü
- Founded: 1973
- Ground: Yeni Ordu Stadium, Ordu
- Capacity: 16,768
- Chairman: Şükrü Bodur
- Manager: Bülent Yenihayat
- League: TFF 2. Lig
- 2025–26: TFF 3. Lig 2nd of 16, Group 3 (promoted via playoffs)
- Website: ordusporfk.com
Home colours	Away colours

52 Orduspor Futbol Kulübü is a Turkish professional football club located in the Gülyalı district of Ordu, Turkey. They currently play in the TFF 2. Lig.

== History ==
The club, which was champion in the 2010-2011 season with the name Ordu İl Özel İdarespor and was eliminated in the play-out match against Ünye Belediyespor, eliminated Soyaspor in the play-out match in the 2013-2014 season for the first time in its history. Started to compete in Bölgesel Amatör Lig. In the same season, after Ordu became a metropolitan city and the special provincial administration was abolished, the name of the club was changed to Guzelorduspor. In the 2016-2017 season, he became the champion in the Regional Amateur League 4th Group TFF Third League qualified to play the promotion play-off. It was promoted to the 3rd League for the first time in its history by beating Arsinspor 2-1 in the play-off match played on April 23, 2017.

Güzelorduspor changed its name to Ordu Futbol Kulübü after its promotion to the 3rd League. As a result of negotiations with Turkish Football Federation, the club was renamed to Yeni Orduspor on July 5, 2017, in order to keep the name of Orduspor, which was relegated to the Regional Amateur League with a debt of approximately 100 million liras while it was fighting in the TFF Super League 5 years ago.

2018-19 TFF Third League, 2nd group, Yeni Orduspor started the season with Mustafa Özer under the management of Nihat Balan after the 14th week, and Mehmet Ali Karaca after the 21st week. competed in the league. They got 13 wins, 7 draws and 14 losses in 34 matches. He finished 9th in his group by collecting 46 points.

On December 22, 2019, the name of the club changed to 52 Orduspor Futbol Kulübü and took its current form.

Sinan Bayraktar was appointed as the Technical Director, which was vacated by Ergin Döner on March 13, 2020.

== League challenges ==
- Super Amateur Leagues: 1973–2014
- Profesyonelliğe Geçiş Ligi: 2014–2017
- TFF 3. Lig: 2017–2026
- TFF 2. Lig: 2026–present
