= 2025–26 Turkish Cup =

Ziraat Turkish Cup

Tournament details
- Country: Turkey
- Dates: 2 September 2025 – 22 May 2026
- Teams: 155

Final positions
- Champions: Trabzonspor (10th title)
- Runners-up: Konyaspor

Tournament statistics
- Matches played: 181
- Goals scored: 615 (3.4 per match)

The 2025–26 Turkish Cup was the 64th edition of the Turkish Football Cup, also known as the Ziraat Turkish Cup, with a total of 155 participating teams from 139 professional and 16 amateur clubs. The competition spanned 11 matchweeks and consisted of four qualifying rounds, followed by a group stage and a final stage.

The group stage featured three groups of eight teams. The 24 teams participating in the group stage were first divided into four pots, each containing six teams. A draw assigned two teams from each pot to each group. In the group stage, each team played four matches in total, facing one team from each pot. Of these matches, two were at home and two away.

At the end of the group stage, the top two teams from each group (six in total), along with the two best third-placed teams, advanced to the quarter-finals, making eight teams in total. In the quarter-finals, the group winners and the best second-placed team were seeded and played their matches at home. A draw then determined the semi-final pairings and the home teams.

Galatasaray were the defending champions, after winning the cup in the previous edition, but they were eliminated in the quarter-finals by Gençlerbirliği.

== Rounds ==
| Round | Draw date | Match dates | Total clubs remaining | Clubs involved | Winners from previous round | New entries at this round | Clubs entering in this round per league | Notes |
|---|---|---|---|---|---|---|---|---|
| First round | 21 August 2025 | 2–4 September 2025 | 155 | 90 | 0 | 90 | 16 amateur teams from provinces that did not have a professional team in the 2025–26 season; 46 teams in 2025–3rd League groups except those entering in further rounds; 28 teams in 2025–2nd League groups except those entering in further rounds | single leg; seedings applied |
| Second round | 8 September 2025 | 16-18 September 2025 | 110 | 78 | 45 | 33 | 18 teams eliminated from the 2024 to 2025 3rd League play-offs; 9 teams eliminated from the 2024 to 2025 2nd League play-offs; 6 teams from the 2024–25 1st League except those entering in further rounds | single leg; seedings applied |
| Third round | 26 September 2025 | 28-30 October 2025 | 71 | 56 | 39 | 17 | 7 teams ranked 8th to 14th in the 2024–25 1st League; 3 teams promoted to the 2025–26 1st League; 7 teams in the 2024–25 Super League, except those entering in further rounds | single leg; seedings applied |
| Fourth round | 6 November 2025 | 2-4 December 2025 | 43 | 38 | 28 | 10 | 4 teams eliminated from 2024 to 2025 1st League play-offs; 3 teams ranked 6th to 8th in 2024–25 Super League; 3 teams promoted to the 2025–26 Super League | single leg; seedings applied |
| Group stage | 5 December 2025 | Matchday 1: 17–18 and 23–24 December 2025 Matchday 2: 13–15 January 2026 Matchday 3: 3–5 February 2026 Matchday 4: 3–5 March 2026 | 24 | 24 | 19 | 5 | 5 teams participating in European competitions | 3 groups of 8 teams; seedings applied |
| Quarter-finals | 11 March 2026 | 21-23 April 2026 | 8 | 8 | 8 | 0 | | single leg; seedings applied; seeded teams play at home |
| Semi-finals | 11 March 2026 | 5-7, 12-14 May 2026 | 4 | 4 | 4 | 0 | | single leg |
| Final | 11 March 2026 | 22 May 2026 | 2 | 2 | 2 | 0 | | single leg; on a neutral field |

== First round ==
28 Second League, 46 Third League and 16 Regional Amateur League teams competed in this round. Seeding took place in this single-leg round. The draw was held on 21 August 2025. The match schedules were announced on 25 August 2025. 24 seeded and 21 unseeded teams qualified for the next round. 18 Second League, 23 Third League, and 4 Regional Amateur League teams qualified for the next round. The biggest upset was Dersimspor (154) eliminating Adanaspor (41). The lowest-ranked team to qualify for the next round was Dersimspor (154). The highest-ranked team eliminated was MKE Ankaragücü (39).

Number of teams per tier still in competition
| Super League (Note: Super League teams began entering the competition in the third round.) | First League (Note: First League teams began entering the competition in the second round.) | Second League | Third League | Amateur League | Total |
|---|---|---|---|---|---|
| 18 / 18 | 20 / 20 | 37 / 37 | 64 / 64 | 16 / 16 | 155 / 155 |

=== Seedings ===
| Seeded | | | | | | Unseeded | | | | | |
| Rank | Team | Rank | Team | Rank | Team | Rank | Team | Rank | Team | Rank | Team |
|---|---|---|---|---|---|---|---|---|---|---|---|
| 39 | MKE Ankaragücü | 63 | Sincan Belediye Ankaraspor | 78 | Nazilli Belediyespor | **111** | **Fatsa Belediyespor** | 126 | Edirnespor | 141 | Hakkari Zapspor |
| **40** | **Şanlıurfaspor** | **64** | **Somaspor** | **79** | **Giresunspor** | 112 | Alanya 1221 FSK | **127** | **Karadeniz Ereğli Belediye** | 142 | 1074 Çankırıspor |
| 41 | Adanaspor | **65** | **İnegölspor** | 80 | Afyonspor Kulübü | **113** | **Kahramanmaraşspor** | **128** | **Yeşilyurt Belediyespor** | 143 | Şırnak Petrolspor |
| 42 | Yeni Malatyaspor | **66** | **Kepezspor FAŞ** | **99** | **Orduspor 1967 SK** | 114 | Polatlı 1926 Spor | **129** | **Eskişehirspor** | **144** | **Kahta 02 Spor** |
| **52** | **Beyoğlu Yeniçarşıspor** | 67 | Yeni Mersin İdman Yurdu | **100** | **Eskişehir Anadolu SF** | 115 | Türk Metal 1963 | 130 | Kilis Belediyespor | **145** | **Şiran Yıldızspor** |
| 53 | İskenderunspor A.Ş. | **68** | **Isparta 32 Spor** | 101 | Uşak Spor A.Ş. | **116** | **Bursa Yıldırımspor** | **131** | **Denizli İY Güreller** | 146 | Bartınspor |
| 54 | Bucaspor 1928 | **69** | **Güzide Gebze Spor Kulübü** | 102 | Yozgat Bld.Bozokspor | 117 | Bulvarspor | **132** | **12 Bingölspor** | 147 | Serhat Ardahan |
| **55** | **1461 Trabzon FK** | **70** | **Bursaspor** | 103 | Etimesgut Spor | **118** | **İzmir Çoruhlu FK** | **133** | **Yalova FK 77** | **148** | **Bitlis Özgüzeldere** |
| **56** | **Ankara Demirspor** | 71 | Mardin 1969 Spor | 104 | Bursa Nilüfer FK | **119** | **Beykoz İshaklıspor** | **134** | **Kestel Belediyespor** | 149 | Sinopspor |
| **57** | **Fethiyespor** | **72** | **Aliağa Futbol A.Ş.** | 105 | Artvin Hopaspor | 120 | Efeler 09 Spor | **135** | **1926 Bulancakspor** | 150 | Bucak Bld.Oğuzhanspor |
| **58** | **Erbaaspor** | **73** | **Muğlaspor** | 106 | Osmaniyespor FK | 121 | Kırşehir Futbol SK | **136** | **Galata** | 151 | Kurtalanspor |
| **59** | **24Erzincanspor** | **74** | **Muş Spor Kulübü** | 107 | Çayelispor | **122** | **Niğde Belediyesi Spor** | 137 | Suvermez Kapadokyaspor | 152 | Ezinespor |
| **60** | **Karaman Futbol Kulübü** | **75** | **Kahramanmaraş İstiklalspor** | **108** | **Çankaya SK** | 123 | İnegöl Kafkas GK | 138 | İnkılap FSK | 153 | Kars 36 Spor |
| 61 | Kırklarelispor | **76** | **Karaköprü Belediyespor** | **109** | **Erciyes 38 FSK** | **124** | **Karabük İdmanyurdu Spor** | 139 | Diyarbekir Spor | **154** | **Dersimspor** |
| 62 | Arnavutköy Belediye | 77 | Altay | 110 | Tokat Bld Plevnespor | **125** | **Bornova 1877** | 140 | Bayburt Özel İdare Spor | 155 | Söğütspor |

Names in Bold indicate teams qualifying for the next round.

=== Matches ===
| 2 September 2025 | **12 Bingölspor (4)** | **3–0** | Mardin 1969 Spor (3) | Bingöl |
| 13:30 | Dilek 30', 41', 59' | Report | | Stadium: Bingöl Şehir Stadium |

| 2 September 2025 | **Karaköprü Belediyespor (4)** | **7–1** | Hakkari Zapspor (5) | Şanlıurfa |
| 15:00 | Vural 8'; Yavaş 42', 58'; Alemdar 44'; Pekşen 55'; Demirel 85'; Karadeniz 90+1' | Report | Dinçer 77' | Stadium: Faruk Çelik Stadium |

| 2 September 2025 | Polatlı 1926 Spor (4) | **1–2** (a.e.t.) | **Çankaya SK (4)** | Ankara |
| 15:00 | Türk 90+5' (pen.) | Report | Kurt 56'; Baştunçoğlu 102' | Stadium: Polatlı İlçe Stadium |

| 2 September 2025 | **Yalova FK 77 (4)** | **2–0** | Bursa Nilüfer FK (4) | Yalova |
| 15:00 | Öztekin 23' (pen.), 88' | Report | | Stadium: Yalova Atatürk Stadium |

| 2 September 2025 | **Bursa Yıldırımspor (4)** | **2–0** (a.e.t.) | Altay (4) | Bursa |
| 15:00 | Büyükkaya 101'; Atcı 105+1' | Report | | Stadium: Minareli Çavuş Spor |

| 2 September 2025 | Sincan Belediye Ankaraspor (3) | **1–2** | **Eskişehirspor (4)** | Ankara |
| 16:00 | Özler 83' (o.g.) | Report | Tatlı 76'; Keskin 90' (pen.) | Stadium: Sincan 15 Temmuz Milli Birlik |

| 2 September 2025 | Bucaspor 1928 (3) | **0–2** | **İzmir Çoruhlu FK (4)** | İzmir |
| 19:00 | | Report | Gültek 18'; Gül 74' | Stadium: Yeni Buca |

| 2 September 2025 | Yeni Mersin İdman Yurdu (3) | **0–2** | **Niğde Belediyesi Spor (4)** | Mersin |
| 20:00 | | Report | Demirel 49'; Çam 58' | Stadium: Mersin Stadium |

| 3 September 2025 | Kars 36 Spor (5) | **0–1** | **24 Erzincanspor (3)** | Kars |
| 14:00 | https://www.tff.org/Default.aspx?pageId=29&macId=287731 | | Çağlar 79' | Stadium: Kars Müstakil Atletizm |

| 3 September 2025 | Alanya 1221 FSK (4) | **0–3** | **Muğlaspor (3)** | Antalya |
| 15:00 | | Report | Ötkün 12'; Fedai 56'; Uzunoğlu 89' | Stadium: Alanya Milli Egemenlik Stadium |

| 3 September 2025 | **Aliağa Futbol A.Ş. (3)** | **2–1** | İnegöl Kafkas GK (4) | İzmir |
| 15:00 | Uysal 15'; Yılmaz 45' | Report | Akdemir 90' | Stadium: Aliağa Atatürk Stadium |

| 3 September 2025 | Arnavutköy Belediye (3) | **2–3** | **Beykoz İshaklıspor (4)** | Istanbul |
| 15:00 | Dinçer 45+1', 90+1' | Report | Yılmaz 18', 45+2'; Adalı 39' | Stadium: Boluca Stadium |

| 3 September 2025 | Bartınspor (5) | **1–3** | **Eskişehir Anadolu SF (4)** | Bartın |
| 15:00 | Coşkun 62' (o.g.) | Report | Temir 23'; Mankır 35'; Aydın 87' (pen.) | Stadium: Ömertepesi Sentetik Futbol |

| 3 September 2025 | Bayburt Özel İdare Spor (5) | **0–7** | **Giresunspor (4)** | Bayburt |
| 15:00 | | Report | Köşker 15', 20', 37', 60'; Nizam 26'; Dik 45', 90+4' | Stadium: Bayburt Genç Osman Stadium |

| 3 September 2025 | Bucak Bld. Oğuzhanspor (5) | **1–2** | **Kepezspor FAŞ (3)** | Burdur |
| 15:00 | Keleş 64' | Report | Yavuzay 21'; Koç 83' | Stadium: Bucak İlçe Stadium |

| 3 September 2025 | Çayelispor (4) | **1–2** | **Şiran Yıldızspor (5)** | Rize |
| 15:00 | Erboğa 15' | Report | Ergut 70'; Altuntaş 82' | Stadium: Çayeli İlçe Stadium |

| 3 September 2025 | **Dersimspor (5)** | **3–0** | Adanaspor (3) | Tunceli |
| 15:00 | Kutlu 2'; Yılmaz 4', 74' | Report | | Stadium: Tunceli Atatürk Stadium |

| 3 September 2025 | Diyarbekirspor (4) | **0–3 w/o** | **Bitlis Özgüzeldere (5)** | Diyarbakır |
| 15:00 | | Report | | Stadium: Seyrantepe 2 Nolu Stadium |

| 3 September 2025 | Edirnespor (4) | **0–3 w/o** | **Somaspor (3)** | Edirne |
| 15:00 | | Report | | Stadium: Edirne Şehir Stadium |

| 3 September 2025 | **Erbaaspor (3)** | **1–1** (a.e.t.) (**3–1** p) | Tokat Bld Plevnespor (4) | Tokat |
| 15:00 | Güler 2' | Report | Gündoğdu 42' | Stadium: Erbaa İlçe Stadium |
| | **Penalties** |
| | İstemi (penalty scored); Şafakoğlu (penalty scored); Konuksever (penalty scored) | | (penalty scored) Gürses |

| 3 September 2025 | Etimesgutspor (4) | **0–1** | **Karadeniz Ereğli Belediye (4)** | Ankara |
| 15:00 | | Report | Kandemir 46' | Stadium: Etimesgut Belediyesi Atatürk Stadium |

| 3 September 2025 | **Güzide Gebze Spor Kulübü (3)** | **6–2** | Bulvarspor (4) | Kocaeli |
| 15:00 | Özdemir 27', 42'; Koçaklı 55', 63' (pen.); Yılmaz 75'; Halil 90+1' | Report | Semiz 13'; Özmert 65' | Stadium: Darıca İlçe Stadium |

| 3 September 2025 | **İnegölspor (3)** | **2–0** | Ezinespor (5) | Bursa |
| 15:00 | Aksoy 45'; Aydın 55' | Report | | Stadium: İnegöl İlçe Stadium |

| 3 September 2025 | İnkılap FSK (4) | **1–2** | **Beyoğlu Yeniçarşıspor (3)** | Istanbul |
| 15:00 | Borak 90+3' | Report | Burgaz 24'; Yılmaz 50' | Stadium: Ümraniye Municipality City Stadium |

| 3 September 2025 | **Kahramanmaraş İstiklalspor (3)** | **2–1** | Kilis Belediyespor (4) | Kahramanmaraş |
| 15:00 | Tunçer 79'; Akarslan 85' | Report | Sezgin 65' | Stadium: Merkez 1 Nolu Sentetik |

| 3 September 2025 | **Kahta 02 Spor (5)** | **2–1** | İskenderunspor A.Ş. (3) | Adıyaman |
| 15:00 | Akar 51'; Kıcıkoğlu 62' | Report | Özkan 49' | Stadium: Kahta İlçe Stadium |

| 3 September 2025 | **Kestel Belediyespor (4)** | **2–1** (a.e.t.) | Uşak Spor A.Ş. (4) | Bursa |
| 15:00 | Çolak 87' (pen.); Karakaş 115' | Report | Kunat 7' | Stadium: Minareli Çavuş Spor |

| 3 September 2025 | Kırklarelispor (3) | **1–2** (a.e.t.) | **Galata (4)** | Kırklareli |
| 15:00 | Devrim 45+4' (pen.) | Report | Koçal 63'; Öztürk 105' | Stadium: Kırklareli Atatürk Stadium |

| 3 September 2025 | Kurtalanspor (5) | **1–4** | **Şanlıurfaspor (3)** | Siirt |
| 15:00 | Olam 49' | Report | Küçük 47', 64'; Doğan 59'; Polat 87' | Stadium: Kurtalan İlçe Stadium |

| 3 September 2025 | **Muş Spor Kulübü (3)** | **8–0** | Şırnak Petrolspor (5) | Muş |
| 15:00 | Kayalar 2'; Budak 8'; Ohawuchi 11' (pen.); Akgün 27', 39'; Sun 31'; Korkmazer 48'; Tekin 86' | Report | | Stadium: Muş Şehir Stadium |

| 3 September 2025 | **Yeşilyurt Belediyespor (4)** | **5–0** | Yeni Malatyaspor (3) | Malatya |
| 15:00 | Öztürk 8', 45+2'; Yılmaz 13'; Göze 53'; Sarısu 80' | Report | | Stadium: New Malatya Stadium |

| 3 September 2025 | Yozgat Bld. Bozokspor (4) | **1–2** | **Fatsa Belediyespor (4)** | Kırşehir |
| 15:00 | Torun 6' | Report | Özyürek 33' (pen.), 58' | Stadium: Kırşehir Ahi Stadium |

| 3 September 2025 | 1074 Çankırıspor (5) | **0–3 w/o** | **Ankara Demirspor (3)** | Çankırı |
| 15:00 | | Report | | Stadium: Çankırı Atatürk Stadium |

| 3 September 2025 | **1461 Trabzon FK (3)** | **4–0** | Serhat Ardahan (5) | Trabzon |
| 15:00 | Türk 5', 39'; Karakuş 27'; Tekke 33' | Report | | Stadium: Of İlçe Stadium |

| 3 September 2025 | **1926 Bulancakspor (4)** | **2–1** (a.e.t.) | Artvin Hopaspor (4) | Giresun |
| 15:00 | Bayraktar 85'; Dibek 102' | Report | Efe 44' | Stadium: Bulancak İlçe Stadium |

| 3 September 2025 | Sinopspor (5) | **0–2** | **Orduspor 1967 SK (4)** | Sinop |
| 16:30 | | Report | Çırak 45+2'; Harlak 59' | Stadium: Sinop Şehir Stadium |

| 3 September 2025 | **Bornova 1877 (4)** | **3–0 w/o** | Afyonspor Kulübü (4) | İzmir |
| 19:00 | | Report | | Stadium: Bornova Aziz Kocaoğlu Stadium |

| 3 September 2025 | **Denizli İY Güreller (4)** | **2–0** | Nazilli Belediyespor (4) | Denizli |
| 19:00 | Cirit 3'; Torun 65' | Report | | Stadium: Denizli Atatürk Stadium |

| 3 September 2025 | **Fethiyespor (3)** | **2–0** | Efeler 09 Spor (4) | Muğla |
| 19:00 | Erdem 48'; Satır 77' | Report | | Stadium: Fethiye İlçe Stadium |

| 3 September 2025 | **Karaman Futbol Kulübü (3)** | **2–1** | Suvermez Kapadokyaspor (4) | Karaman |
| 19:00 | Vural 32'; Karaduman 90+4' | Report | Biçer 7' | Stadium: Yeni Karaman Stadium |

| 3 September 2025 | MKE Ankaragücü (3) | **2–3** | **Karabük İdmanyurdu Spor (4)** | Ankara |
| 20:00 | Polat 10'; Aktas 33' | Report | Köroğlu 8'; Altıntaş 25'; Özyıldırım 54' (pen.) | Stadium: Eryaman Stadium |

| 4 September 2025 | **Kahramanmaraşspor (4)** | **1–0** (a.e.t.) | Osmaniyespor FK (4) | Kahramanmaraş |
| 14:00 | Dege 101' | Report | | Stadium: Merkez 1 Nolu Sentetik |

| 4 September 2025 | **Isparta 32 Spor (3)** | **4–0** | Kırşehir Futbol SK (4) | Isparta |
| 16:30 | Baykuş 18'; Başyiğit 61', 63'; Altunbaş 80' | Report | | Stadium: Isparta Atatürk Stadium |

| 4 September 2025 | **Erciyes 38 FSK (4)** | **2–0** | Türk Metal 1963 (4) | Kayseri |
| 19:00 | Balcı 32'; Yasak 48' | Report | | Stadium: Kadir Has Stadium |

| 4 September 2025 | **Bursaspor (3)** | **7–0** | Söğütspor (5) | Bursa |
| 21:00 | Aydoğan 18'; Ünver 51'; Gedikli 56'; Gür 58'; Çam 71'; Mutlu 81' (o.g.); Türker 89' | Report | | Stadium: Atatürk Spor Kompleksi Matlı |

=== Upsets ===
| Giantkiller | Opponent (tier) |
Upset of two leagues above
| **Dersimspor (level 5)** | 3–0 at home vs Adanaspor (level 3) |
| **Kahta 02 Spor (level 5)** | 1–0 at home vs İskenderunspor A.Ş. (level 3) |

== Second round ==
6 First League, 27 Second League, 41 Third League, and 4 Regional Amateur League teams competed in this round. The draw was held on 8 September 2025. The match schedules were announced on 9 September 2025. 19 seeded and 20 unseeded teams qualified for the next round. 4 First League, 14 Second League, 19 Third League, and 2 Regional Amateur League teams qualified for the next round. The biggest upset was Kahta 02 Spor (144) eliminating Adana Demirspor (22). The lowest-ranked team to qualify for the next round was Dersimspor (154). The highest-ranked team eliminated was Hatayspor (21).

Number of teams per tier still in competition
| Super League (Note: Super League teams began entering the competition in the third round.) | First League | Second League | Third League | Amateur League | Total |
|---|---|---|---|---|---|
| 18 / 18 | 20 / 20 | 27 / 37 | 41 / 64 | 4 / 16 | 110 / 155 |

=== Seedings ===
| Seeded | | | | | | Unseeded | | | | | |
| Rank | Team | Rank | Team | Rank | Team | Rank | Team | Rank | Team | Rank | Team |
|---|---|---|---|---|---|---|---|---|---|---|---|
| **19** | **Bodrum FK** | 49 | Altınordu | **68** | **Isparta 32 Spor** | **85** | **52 Orduspor FK** | 98 | Pazarspor | 127 | Karadeniz Ereğli Belediye |
| **20** | **Sivasspor** | **50** | **Karacabey Belediye Spor** | 69 | Güzide Gebze Spor Kulübü | **86** | **Ağrı 1970 Spor** | **99** | **Orduspor 1967 SK** | **128** | **Yeşilyurt Belediyespor** |
| 21 | Hatayspor | **51** | **Beykoz Anadolu** | **70** | **Bursaspor** | 87 | Amasyaspor Futbol Kulübü | 100 | Eskişehir Anadolu SF | 129 | Eskişehirspor |
| 22 | Adana Demirspor | **52** | **Beyoğlu Yeniçarşıspor** | **72** | **Aliağa Futbol A.Ş.** | **88** | **Belediye Kütahyaspor** | **108** | **Çankaya SK** | 131 | Denizli İY Güreller |
| **34** | **Manisa FK** | **55** | **1461 Trabzon FK** | **73** | **Muğlaspor** | **89** | **Zonguldakspor FK** | **109** | **Erciyes 38 FSK** | **132** | **12 Bingölspor** |
| **35** | **Pendikspor** | 56 | Ankara Demirspor | **74** | **Muş Spor Kulübü** | 90 | K.Çekmece Sinopspor | **111** | **Fatsa Belediyespor** | **133** | **Yalova FK 77** |
| 40 | Şanlıurfaspor | **57** | **Fethiyespor** | 75 | Kahramanmaraş İstiklalspor | 91 | Silivrispor | **113** | **Kahramanmaraşspor** | 134 | Kestel Belediyespor |
| 43 | Batman Petrolspor | **58** | **Erbaaspor** | **76** | **Karaköprü Belediyespor** | 92 | Düzcespor | **116** | **Bursa Yıldırımspor** | **135** | **1926 Bulancakspor** |
| 44 | Elazığspor | 59 | 24Erzincanspor | 79 | Giresunspor | **93** | **Çorluspor 1947** | 118 | İzmir Çoruhlu FK | 136 | Galata |
| 45 | 68 Aksaray Belediyespor | 60 | Karaman Futbol Kulübü | 81 | Sebat Gençlik SK | 94 | Tire 2021 FK | 119 | Beykoz İshaklıspor | **144** | **Kahta 02 Spor** |
| 46 | GMG Kastamonuspor | 64 | Somaspor | 82 | Ayvalıkgücü Belediyespor | 95 | Kırıkkale FK | **122** | **Niğde Belediyesi Spor** | 145 | Şiran Yıldızspor |
| 47 | Adana 01 Futbol Kulübü | **65** | **İnegölspor** | 83 | Karşıyaka | **96** | **Silifke Belediye Spor** | **124** | **Karabük İdmanyurdu Spor** | 148 | Bitlis Özgüzeldere |
| **48** | **Menemen FK** | **66** | **Kepezspor FAŞ** | 84 | Balıkesirspor | 97 | Mazıdağı Fosfat SK | 125 | Bornova 1877 | **154** | **Dersimspor** |

Names in Bold indicate teams qualified for the next round.

=== Matches ===
| 16 September 2025 | **Ağrı 1970 Spor (4)** | **4–1** | Batman Petrolspor (3) | Ağrı |
| 13:30 | Kayabaş 11'; Kılıç 20'; Yaşa 50'; Çulha 53' | Report | Rüzgar 22' | Stadium: Vali Lütfü Yeğenoğlu Stadium |

| 16 September 2025 | **Kahta 02 Spor (5)** | **2–1** | Adana Demirspor (2) | Adıyaman |
| 14:30 | Kıcıkoğlu 12'; Akar 86' | Report | Kavrazlı 90' | Stadium: Kahta İlçe Stadium |

| 16 September 2025 | Ankara Demirspor (3) | **2–2** (a.e.t.) (**3-5** p) | **Zonguldakspor FK (4)** | Ankara |
| 15:00 | Akdoğan 1', 93' | Report | Alzin 44'; Binici 101' | Stadium: TCDD Ankara Demirspor Stadium |
| | **Penalties** |
| | Caliskan (penalty scored); Akdoğan (penalty scored); Aydın (penalty scored) | | (penalty scored) Türközü; (penalty scored) Ayar; (penalty scored) Binici; (penalty scored) Şanlitürk; (penalty scored) Tayfun |

| 16 September 2025 | Kestel Belediyespor (4) | **0–1** | **Fethiyespor (3)** | Bursa |
| 15:00 | | Report | Çeken 36' | Stadium: Minareli Çavuş |

| 16 September 2025 | Kırıkkale FK (4) | **0–2** | **Manisa FK (2)** | Kırıkkale |
| 15:30 | | Report | Yüce 14', 90+4' | Stadium: Başpınar Stadium |

| 16 September 2025 | Tire 2021 FK (4) | **0–1** | **Bodrum FK (2)** | İzmir |
| 18:00 | | Report | Dumanlı 55' | Stadium: Tire Gazi Mustafa Kemal Atatürk Stadium |

| 16 September 2025 | İzmir Çoruhlu FK (4) | **0–3** | **Isparta 32 Spor (3)** | İzmir |
| 19:00 | | Report | Akaydın 30', 89'; Başyiğit 90+1' | Stadium: Bornova Aziz Kocaoğlu Stadium |

| 16 September 2025 | Hatayspor (2) | **2–3** | **Erciyes 38 FSK (4)** | Mersin |
| 20:30 | Bamgboye 63', 75' | Report | Yasak 45+4'; Ekinci 80'; Adamcıl 90+5' | Stadium: Mersin Stadium |

| 17 September 2025 | Karadeniz Ereğli Belediye (4) | **1–2** | **Bursaspor (3)** | Zonguldak |
| 14:00 | Yılmaz 54' | Report | Aydoğan 58'; Gedikli 67' | Stadium: Şehit Vefa Karakurdu Stadium |

| 17 September 2025 | **Dersimspor (5)** | **2–0** | Şanlıurfaspor (3) | Tunceli |
| 14:30 | Yılmaz 45+2', 90' | Report | | Stadium: Tunceli Atatürk Stadium |

| 17 September 2025 | **Kahramanmaraşspor (4)** | **1–0** (a.e.t.) | Karaman Futbol Kulübü (3) | Kahramanmaraş |
| 14:30 | Saygı 105' | Report | | Stadium: Merkez 1 Nolu |

| 16 September 2025 | **Karaköprü Belediyespor (4)** | **2–1** | Bitlis Özgüzeldere (5) | Şanlıurfa |
| 14:30 | Şimdi 12' (o.g.); Bakkal 87' | Report | Aynacı 45+3' | Stadium: Faruk Çelik Stadium |

| 17 September 2025 | **Muş Spor Kulübü (3)** | **5–0** | Mazıdağı Fosfat SK (4) | Muş |
| 14:30 | Akgün 8', 61'; Aslıyüksek 44', 54' (pen.); Budak 46' | Report | | Stadium: Muş Şehir Stadium |

| 17 September 2025 | **Yeşilyurt Belediyespor (4)** | **3–2** | Adana 01 Futbol Kulübü (3) | Malatya |
| 14:30 | Karabacak 19'; Karadağ 29'; Furtana 53' | Report | Sezen 65'; Özyapı 73' | Stadium: Yeşiltepe 1 Nolu Stadium |

| 17 September 2025 | Amasyaspor Futbol Kulübü (4) | **0–1** | **1461 Trabzon FK (3)** | Amasya |
| 15:00 | | Report | Türk 12' (pen.) | Stadium: 12 Haziran Stadium |

| 17 September 2025 | **Belediye Kütahyaspor (4)** | **3–1** | Altınordu (3) | Kütahya |
| 15:00 | Çift 22'; Ekiz 38'; Süer 80' | Report | Avcı 86' | Stadium: Dumlupınar Stadium |

| 16 September 2025 | Beykoz İshaklıspor (4) | **0–2** | **Karacabey Belediye Spor (3)** | Istanbul |
| 15:00 | | Report | Köse 78'; Kaya 87' | Stadium: Silivri Müjdat Gürsu Stadium |

| 17 September 2025 | **Çorluspor 1947 (4)** | **2–1** (a.e.t.) | Ayvalıkgücü Belediyespor (4) | Tekirdağ |
| 15:00 | Yağcı 56'; Doğan 106' | Report | Kısacık 85' | Stadium: General Basri Saran Stadium |

| 17 September 2025 | **Erbaaspor (3)** | **2–0** | Pazarspor (4) | Tokat |
| 15:00 | Türköz 37'; Şahin 45' | Report | | Stadium: Erbaa İlçe Stadium |

| 17 September 2025 | Galata (4) | **1–5** | **Beykoz Anadolu (3)** | Istanbul |
| 15:00 | Koçal 56' (pen.) | Report | Ünlü 3' (o.g.); Ateş 19'; Fırıncı 40'; Kara 63'; Avcılar 69' | Stadium: Bayrampaşa Çetin Emeç Stadium |

| 17 September 2025 | GMG Kastamonuspor (3) | **3–3** (a.e.t.) (**4-5** p) | **Fatsa Belediyespor (4)** | Kastamonu |
| 15:00 | Talay 14'; Öztürk 70' (pen.); Kahya 117' | Report | Köroğlu 37'; Şimşek 79'; Şahin 107' | Stadium: Gazi Stadium |
| | **Penalties** |
| | Ari (penalty scored); Dikbasan (penalty scored); Günaldı (penalty scored); Kahya (penalty scored) | | (penalty scored) Onaran; (penalty scored) Uludaş; (penalty scored) Memiş; (penalty scored) Yılmaz; (penalty scored) Bilikli |

| 17 September 2025 | **Karabük İdmanyurdu Spor (4)** | **1–0** | Güzide Gebze Spor Kulübü (3) | Karabük |
| 15:00 | Keleş 71' | Report | | Stadium: Dr. Necmettin Şeyhoğlu Stadium |

| 17 September 2025 | Küçükçekmece Sinopspor (4) | **1–3** (a.e.t.) | **İnegölspor (3)** | Istanbul |
| 15:00 | Selimoğlu 36' (pen.) | Report | Duran 70'; Ozan 96', 115' | Stadium: Bolluca Stadium |

| 17 September 2025 | **Kepezspor FAŞ (3)** | **0–0** (a.e.t.) (**4-2** p) | Denizli İY Güreller (4) | Antalya |
| 15:00 | | Report | | Stadium: Kepez Hasan Doğan Stadium |
| | **Penalties** |
| | Koç (penalty scored); Atila (penalty scored); Özen (penalty scored); Atagün (penalty scored) | | (penalty scored) Mutlu; (penalty scored) Aydemir |

| 17 September 2025 | **Silifke Belediye Spor (4)** | **7–1** | Kahramanmaraş İstiklalspor (3) | Mersin |
| 15:00 | Özder 26', 42', 47', 79'; İşler 34'; Kanarya 73'; Akkurt 85' | Report | Alkan 59' (o.g.) | Stadium: Silifke Şehir Stadium |

| 17 September 2025 | Silivrispor (4) | **1–1** (a.e.t.) (**3-4** p) | **Beyoğlu Yeniçarşıspor (3)** | Istanbul |
| 15:00 | Aksakal 120' | Report | Burgaz 117' | Stadium: Silivri Müjdat Gürsu Stadium |
| | **Penalties** |
| | Eser (penalty scored); Arslan (penalty scored); Kara (penalty scored) | | (penalty scored) Özköroğlu; (penalty scored) Ayhan; (penalty scored) Soyarslan; (penalty scored) Büyükbaş |

| 17 September 2025 | Somaspor (3) | **1–3** | **Çankaya SK (4)** | Manisa |
| 15:00 | Duman 82' | Report | Bıyık 17'; Pektas 39' (o.g.); Ilgaz 90+7' (pen.) | Stadium: Soma Atatürk Stadium |

| 17 September 2025 | **Sivasspor (2)** | **2–1** (a.e.t.) | Şiran Yıldızspor (5) | Sivas |
| 16:00 | Badji 11' (pen.); Yıldırım 92' | Report | Yıldırım 4' | Stadium: New Sivas 4 Eylül Stadium |

| 17 September 2025 | Elazığspor (3) | **2–3** (a.e.t.) | **12 Bingölspor (4)** | Elazığ |
| 18:00 | Kaya 2'; Soy 16' | Report | Nizam 11'; Saydam 14'; Çelik 117' | Stadium: Elazığ Stadium |

| 17 September 2025 | Balıkesirspor (4) | **1–2** | **Yalova FK 77 (4)** | Balıkesir |
| 19:00 | Yılmaz 11' | Report | Akça 26'; Topatar 64' | Stadium: Balıkesir Atatürk Stadium |

| 17 September 2025 | Bornova 1877 (4) | **0–6** | **Aliağa Futbol A.Ş. (3)** | İzmir |
| 19:00 | https://www.tff.org/Default.aspx?pageId=29&macId=305257 | | Kavaklıdere 5'; Kılıç 15'; Özek 24'; Karaahmet 38'; Yılmaz 71'; Demir 80' | Stadium: Bornova Aziz Kocaoğlu Stadium |

| 17 September 2025 | Karşıyaka (4) | **0–1** | **Bursa Yıldırımspor (4)** | İzmir |
| 19:00 | | Report | Atcı 29' | Stadium: Alsancak Mustafa Denizli Stadium |

| 17 September 2025 | **Menemen FK (3)** | **2–1** | Eskişehir Anadolu SF (4) | İzmir |
| 19:00 | Demiroğlu 74'; Poyraz 87' | Report | Temir 15' | Stadium: Menemen İlçe Stadium |

| 17 September 2025 | **Niğde Belediyesi Spor (4)** | **3–1** | 68 Aksaray Belediyespor (3) | Niğde |
| 19:00 | Özbilen 8', 43'; Uzun 52' | Report | Kaya 56' | Stadium: Niğde 5 Şubat Stadium |

| 17 September 2025 | **Orduspor 1967 SK (4)** | **2–1** (a.e.t.) | Sebat Gençlik SK (4) | Ordu |
| 19:00 | Cevher 72'; Özkayımoğlu 104' | Report | Tütünci 32' | Stadium: Yeni Ordu Stadium |

| 17 September 2025 | 24 Erzincanspor (3) | **0–2** | **1926 Bulancakspor (4)** | Erzincan |
| 19:00 | | Report | Yılmaz 10'; Bayraktar 42' | Stadium: Erzincan 13 Şubat Şehir Stadium |

| 18 September 2025 | Düzcespor (4) | **3–3** (a.e.t.) (**3-5** p) | **Pendikspor (2)** | Düzce |
| 14:30 | Fidan 57' (o.g.); Arslan 62'; Pazar 87' | Report | Uğur 32'; Bitin 45+3' (pen.), 55' | Stadium: Düzce Şehir Stadium |
| | **Penalties** |
| | Ayhanoğlu (penalty scored); Pazar (penalty scored); Uzun (penalty scored) | | (penalty scored) Karadeniz; (penalty scored) Gökçe; (penalty scored) Sülüngöz; (penalty scored) Wilks; (penalty scored) Clarke-Harris |

| 18 September 2025 | Giresunspor (4) | **1–2** | **52 Orduspor FK (4)** | Giresun |
| 17:00 | Aydemir 11' | Report | Tunç 52', 90+4' | Stadium: Çotanak Sports Complex |

| 18 September 2025 | Eskişehirspor (4) | **0–3** | **Muğlaspor (3)** | Eskişehir |
| 20:00 | | Report | Okumuş 15' (o.g.); Yeşilördek 72'; Fedai 81' | Stadium: Prof. Dr. Fethi Heper Stadium |

=== Upsets ===
| Giantkiller | Opponent (tier) |
Upset of three leagues above
| **Kahta 02 Spor (level 5)** | 2–1 at home vs Adana Demirspor (level 2) |
Upset of two leagues above
| **Erciyes 38 FSK (level 4)** | 3–2 away vs Hatayspor (level 2) |
| **Dersimspor (level 5)** | 2–0 at home vs Şanlıurfaspor (level 3) |

== Third round ==
7 Super League, 14 First League, 14 Second League, 19 Third League, and 2 Regional Amateur League teams competed in this round. The draw was held on 26 September 2025. The match schedules were announced on 30 September 2025. 19 seeded and 9 unseeded teams qualified for the next round. 6 Super League, 10 First League, 6 Second League, 5 Third League, and 1 Regional Amateur League teams qualified for the next round. The biggest upset was Kahta 02 Spor (144) eliminating Kasımpaşa (10). The lowest-ranked team to qualify for the next round was Kahta 02 Spor (144). The highest-ranked team eliminated was Kasımpaşa (10).

Number of teams per tier still in competition
| Super League | First League | Second League | Third League | Amateur League | Total |
|---|---|---|---|---|---|
| 18 / 18 | 18 / 20 | 14 / 37 | 19 / 64 | 2 / 16 | 71 / 155 |

=== Seedings ===
| Seeded | | | | | | Unseeded | | | | | |
| Rank | Team | Rank | Team | Rank | Team | Rank | Team | Rank | Team | Rank | Team |
|---|---|---|---|---|---|---|---|---|---|---|---|
| **9** | **Çaykur Rizespor** | 28 | Amed SK | **38** | **Van Spor FK** | 65 | İnegölspor | 88 | Belediye Kütahyaspor | 122 | Niğde Belediyesi Spor |
| 10 | Kasımpaşa | **29** | **Çorum FK** | 48 | Menemen FK | 66 | Kepezspor FAŞ | 89 | Zonguldakspor FK | 124 | Karabük İdmanyurdu Spor |
| **11** | **Konyaspor** | 30 | Ümraniyespor | **50** | **Karacabey Belediye Spor** | 68 | Isparta 32 Spor | 93 | Çorluspor 1947 | 128 | Yeşilyurt Belediyespor |
| **12** | **Alanyaspor** | **31** | **Esenler Erokspor** | 51 | Beykoz Anadolu | 70 | Bursaspor | **96** | **Silifke Belediye Spor** | 132 | 12 Bingölspor |
| **13** | **Kayserispor** | **32** | **Sakaryaspor** | **52** | **Beyoğlu Yeniçarşıspor** | **72** | **Aliağa Futbol A.Ş.** | **99** | **Orduspor 1967 SK** | **133** | **Yalova FK 77** |
| **14** | **Gaziantep FK** | **33** | **Keçiörengücü** | 55 | 1461 Trabzon FK | **73** | **Muğlaspor** | **108** | **Çankaya SK** | 135 | 1926 Bulancakspor |
| **15** | **Antalyaspor** | 34 | Manisa FK | **57** | **Fethiyespor** | **74** | **Muş Spor Kulübü** | 109 | Erciyes 38 FSK | **144** | **Kahta 02 Spor** |
| **19** | **Bodrum FK** | **35** | **Pendikspor** | 58 | Erbaaspor | 76 | Karaköprü Belediyespor | 111 | Fatsa Belediyespor | 154 | Dersimspor |
| **20** | **Sivasspor** | **36** | **Sarıyer** | | | 85 | 52 Orduspor FK | **113** | **Kahramanmaraşspor** | | |
| **27** | **Iğdır FK** | 37 | Serik Spor | | | 86 | Ağrı 1970 Spor | 116 | Bursa Yıldırımspor | | |

Names in Bold indicate teams qualifying for the next round.

=== Matches ===
| 28 October 2025 | Kepezspor FAŞ (3) | **1–3** | **Sivasspor (2)** | Antalya |
| 13:00 | Polat 30' | Report | Mbunga-Kimpioka 10'; Badji 22'; Ay 87' (o.g.) | Stadium: Kepez Hasan Doğan Stadium |

| 28 October 2025 | **Aliağa Futbol A.Ş. (3)** | **4–3** | Serik Spor (2) | İzmir |
| 13:30 | Gümüş 10'; Yılmaz 35', 79'; Saymak 74' | Report | Özcan 33'; Yükseloğlu 71'; Turgen 90+4' | Stadium: Aliağa Atatürk Stadium |

| 28 October 2025 | Dersimspor (5) | **0–3** | **Fethiyespor (3)** | Tunceli |
| 13:30 | | Report | Türkmen 45+1', 64'; Eralp 81' | Stadium: Tunceli Atatürk Stadium |

| 28 October 2025 | Fatsa Belediyespor (4) | **3–3** (a.e.t.) (**6–7** p) | **Van Spor FK (2)** | Ordu |
| 13:30 | Elmali 26'; Altunkaynak 56'; Sipahiler 69' | Report | Manış 49'; Kör 62', 75' | Stadium: Fatsa İlçe Stadium |
| | **Penalties** |
| | Alturan (penalty scored); Özyürek (penalty scored); Şimşek (penalty scored); Uludaş (penalty scored); Bilikli (penalty missed); Çalık (penalty scored); Şahin (penalty scored); Biçer (penalty missed) | | (penalty scored) Bilal; (penalty scored) Manış; (penalty scored) Usta; (penalty missed) Yağızer; (penalty scored) Tümen; (penalty scored) Ölmez; (penalty scored) Şakar; (penalty scored) Başaran |

| 28 October 2025 | **Kahramanmaraşspor (4)** | **4–0** | Ümraniyespor (2) | Kahramanmaraş |
| 13:30 | Aydın 7'; Çakmak 39'; Yılmaz 41'; Karaca 80' | Report | | Stadium: Batıpark Adem Şahan Stadium |

| 28 October 2025 | 52 Orduspor FK (4) | **0–2** | **Sarıyer (2)** | Ordu |
| 15:30 | | Report | Koç 63'; Sol 90+3' | Stadium: Yeni Ordu Stadium |

| 28 October 2025 | **Sakaryaspor (2)** | **4–0** | İnegölspor (3) | Sakarya |
| 18:00 | Aktaş 26' (o.g.); Demir 33'; Bayram 42'; Cihan 79' | Report | | Stadium: New Sakarya Stadium |

| 28 October 2025 | **Kayserispor (1)** | **1–0** | Niğde Belediyesi Spor (4) | Kayseri |
| 20:30 | Tuci 3' | Report | | Stadium: Kadir Has Stadium |

| 29 October 2025 | Isparta 32 Spor (3) | **0–2** | **Beyoğlu Yeniçarşıspor (3)** | Isparta |
| 12:00 | | Report | Özköroğlu 30'; Eren 70' (pen.) | Stadium: Isparta Atatürk Stadium |

| 29 October 2025 | **Kahta 02 Spor (5)** | **3–1** | Kasımpaşa (1) | Adıyaman |
| 13:00 | Fırat 20'; Akıl 41'; Ceylan 90+3' | Report | Özden 10' | Stadium: Kahta İlçe Stadium |

| 29 October 2025 | Beykoz Anadolu (3) | **1–3** | **Yalova FK 77 (4)** | Istanbul |
| 13:30 | Yalçıner 81' | Report | Özdıraz 20'; Arı 44', 85' | Stadium: Maltepe Hasan Polat Stadium |

| 29 October 2025 | **Çankaya SK (4)** | **2–0** | 1461 Trabzon FK (3) | Ankara |
| 13:30 | Kurt 45+2' (pen.), 85' | Report | | Stadium: Osmanlı Stadium |

| 29 October 2025 | Erciyes 38 FSK (4) | **2–5** | **Keçiörengücü (2)** | Kayseri |
| 13:30 | Kılıç 39'; Adamcıl 90+3' | Report | Haqi 11'; Ozler 22', 42'; Fernandes 58'; Roshi 86' | Stadium: Kayseri Atatürk Stadium |

| 29 October 2025 | **Karacabey Belediye Spor (3)** | **3–1** | Yeşilyurt Belediyespor (4) | Bursa |
| 13:30 | Erdemer 46'; Balıkçı 55', 79' | Report | Furtana 52' | Stadium: Karacabey Mustafa Fehmi Gerçeker Stadium |

| 29 October 2025 | **Muş Spor Kulübü (3)** | **1–0** (a.e.t.) | Menemen FK (3) | Muş |
| 13:30 | Akgün 97' | Report | | Stadium: Muş Şehir Stadium |

| 29 October 2025 | **Silifke Belediye Spor (4)** | **3–0** | Amed SK (2) | Mersin |
| 13:30 | Toprak 28'; Özder 37'; Kanarya 88' | Report | | Stadium: Silifke Şehir Stadium |

| 29 October 2025 | Bursa Yıldırımspor (4) | **1–2** | **Alanyaspor (1)** | Bursa |
| 15:00 | Güventürk 48' | Report | Hadergjonaj 22' (pen.); Mogultay 31' | Stadium: Minareli Çavuş |

| 29 October 2025 | **Çorum FK (2)** | **3–0** | Belediye Kütahyaspor (4) | Çorum |
| 15:30 | Eze 9' (pen.), 19', 75' | Report | | Stadium: Çorum City Stadium |

| 29 October 2025 | **Orduspor 1967 SK (4)** | **4–2** | Erbaaspor (3) | Ordu |
| 15:30 | Denizli 18'; Özkayımoğlu 54', 76'; Cevher 63' | Report | Aynaoğlu 34'; Güler 48' | Stadium: Yeni Ordu Stadium |

| 29 October 2025 | **Pendikspor (2)** | **3–2** | Çorluspor 1947 (4) | Istanbul |
| 15:30 | Sequeira 35' (pen.); Thuram 52'; Pınar 68' (o.g.) | Report | Sungur 18'; Turan 26' | Stadium: Pendik Stadium |

| 29 October 2025 | Manisa FK (2) | **0–2** | **Muğlaspor (3)** | Manisa |
| 18:00 | | Report | Yiğit 29'; Fedai 51' | Stadium: Manisa 19 Mayıs Stadium |

| 29 October 2025 | **Antalyaspor (1)** | **3–0** | Bursaspor (3) | Antalya |
| 20:30 | Safuri 36' (pen.); Cvancara 48'; Boli 60' | Report | | Stadium: Antalya Stadium |

| 30 October 2025 | **Esenler Erokspor (2)** | **3–0** | Ağrı 1970 Spor (4) | Istanbul |
| 13:00 | Usta 4' (o.g.); Karaman 72'; Ulaş 90+5' | Report | | Stadium: Esenler Erokspor Stadium |

| 30 October 2025 | Karaköprü Belediyespor (4) | **0–3** | **Çaykur Rizespor (1)** | Şanlıurfa |
| 13:00 | | Report | Sowe 8', 73'; Jurecka 79' | Stadium: Faruk Çelik Stadium |

| 30 October 2025 | 1926 Bulancakspor (4) | **1–3** | **Iğdır FK (2)** | Giresun |
| 13:30 | Kuş 65' | Report | Rotariu 14', 45+1'; Sarıtaş 90+3' | Stadium: Bulancak İlçe Stadium |

| 30 October 2025 | Zonguldakspor FK (4) | **0–5** | **Bodrum FK (2)** | Zonguldak |
| 14:45 | | Report | Yılmaz 65', 74'; Dimitrov 72' (pen.); Sertkaya 75'; Tarım 86' | Stadium: Karaelmas Kemal Köksal Stadium |

| 30 October 2025 | **Gaziantep FK (1)** | **2–0** | Karabük İdmanyurdu Spor (4) | Gaziantep |
| 18:00 | Kulasin 3'; Bacuna 24' | Report | | Stadium: Gaziantep Stadium |

| 30 October 2025 | **Konyaspor (1)** | **4–2** | 12 Bingölspor (4) | Konya |
| 20:30 | Stefanescu 6'; Buğa 19'; Bjorlo 62'; Bostan 67' | Report | Çelik 15'; Kara 76' | Stadium: Konya Metropolitan Municipality Stadium |

=== Upsets ===
| Giantkiller | Opponent (tier) |
Upset of four leagues above
| **Kahta 02 Spor (level 5)** | 3–1 at home vs Kasımpaşa (level 1) |
Upset of two leagues above
| **Kahramanmaraşspor (level 4)** | 4–0 at home vs Ümraniyespor (level 2) |
| **Silifke Belediye Spor (level 4)** | 3–0 at home vs Amed SK (level 2) |

== Fourth round ==
12 Super League, 14 First League, 6 Second League, 5 Third League, and 1 Regional Amateur League teams competed in this round. The draw was held on 6 November 2025. The match schedules were announced on 14 November 2025. 15 seeded and 4 unseeded teams qualified for the next round. 10 Super League, 6 First League, and 3 Second League teams qualified for the next round. The biggest upset was Aliağa Futbol A.Ş. (72) eliminating Sivasspor (20). The lowest-ranked team to qualify for the next round was Aliağa Futbol A.Ş. (72). The highest-ranked team eliminated was Göztepe (8).

Number of teams per tier still in competition
| Super League | First League | Second League | Third League | Amateur League | Total |
|---|---|---|---|---|---|
| 17 / 18 | 14 / 20 | 6 / 37 | 5 / 64 | 1 / 16 | 43 / 155 |

=== Seedings ===
| Seeded | | | | | | Unseeded | | | | | |
| Rank | Team | Rank | Team | Rank | Team | Rank | Team | Rank | Team | Rank | Team |
|---|---|---|---|---|---|---|---|---|---|---|---|
| **6** | **Eyüpspor** | **14** | **Gaziantep FK** | **23** | **İstanbulspor** | 29 | Çorum FK | 50 | Karacabey Belediye Spor | 99 | Orduspor 1967 SK |
| **7** | **Trabzonspor** | **15** | **Antalyaspor** | 24 | Bandırmaspor | 31 | Esenler Erokspor | **52** | **Beyoğlu Yeniçarşıspor** | 108 | Çankaya SK |
| 8 | Göztepe | **16** | **Kocaelispor** | **25** | **Erzurumspor FK** | 32 | Sakaryaspor | **57** | **Fethiyespor** | 113 | Kahramanmaraşspor |
| **9** | **Çaykur Rizespor** | **17** | **Gençlerbirliği** | **26** | **Boluspor** | **33** | **Keçiörengücü** | **72** | **Aliağa Futbol A.Ş.** | 133 | Yalova FK 77 |
| **11** | **Konyaspor** | **18** | **Fatih Karagümrük** | **27** | **Iğdır FK** | 35 | Pendikspor | 73 | Muğlaspor | 144 | Kahta 02 Spor |
| **12** | **Alanyaspor** | **19** | **Bodrum FK** | | | 36 | Sarıyer | 74 | Muş Spor Kulübü | | |
| 13 | Kayserispor | 20 | Sivasspor | | | 38 | Van Spor FK | 96 | Silifke Belediye Spor | | |

Names in Bold indicate teams qualifying for the next round.

=== Matches ===
| 2 December 2025 | Muş Spor Kulübü (3) | **1–4** | **Konyaspor (1)** | Muş |
| 13:00 | Aslıyüksek 89' | Report | Bardhi 38'; Calusic 52'; Bostan 53', 90+2' | Stadium: Muş Şehir Stadium |

| 2 December 2025 | **Keçiörengücü (2)** | **2–0** (a.e.t.) | Kayserispor (1) | Ankara |
| 15:30 | Bulut 112'; Roshi 117' | Report | | Stadium: Eryaman Stadium |

| 2 December 2025 | **Çaykur Rizespor (1)** | **6–1** | Pendikspor (2) | Rize |
| 18:00 | Akaydin 15'; Pala 25'; Mihaila 32'; Olawoyin 48'; Augusto 50'; Şahin 83' | Report | Clarke-Harris 88' | Stadium: Rize City Stadium |

| 2 December 2025 | Sakaryaspor (2) | **0–5** | **Gençlerbirliği (1)** | Sakarya |
| 20:30 | | Report | Mimaroğlu 69' (pen.); Demir 75', 83'; Onur 87'; Osmanoğlu 90+3' | Stadium: New Sakarya Stadium |

| 3 December 2025 | Esenler Erokspor (2) | **2–5** | **Fatih Karagümrük (1)** | Istanbul |
| 13:00 | Hidayetoğlu 28', 49' | Report | Gray 10', 38', 88'; Serginho 12'; Çankaya 22' | Stadium: Esenler Erokspor Stadium |

| 3 December 2025 | **Eyüpspor (1)** | **6–1** | Çankaya SK (4) | Istanbul |
| 13:30 | Seslar 9'; Altunbaş 15'; Ampem 25'; Saiz 82' (pen.); Sadia 85'; Legowski 90+2' | Report | Akpınar 48' | Stadium: Recep Tayyip Erdoğan Stadium |

| 3 December 2025 | **İstanbulspor (2)** | **6–0** | Sarıyer (2) | Istanbul |
| 13:30 | Duymaz 2', 48', 75'; Mamadou 9'; Krstovski 45'; Sol 50' | Report | | Stadium: Esenyurt Necmi Kadıoğlu Stadium |

| 3 December 2025 | Kahramanmaraşspor (4) | **1–3** (a.e.t.) | **Erzurumspor FK (2)** | Kahramanmaraş |
| 13:30 | Toklu 3' | Report | Sylla 28', 97', 120+3' | Stadium: Batıpark Adem Şahan Stadium |

| 3 December 2025 | Sivasspor (2) | **1–3** | **Aliağa Futbol A.Ş. (3)** | Sivas |
| 13:30 | Avramovski 60' | Report | Karaahmet 15', 55'; Açıkgöz 75' | Stadium: New 4 Eylül Stadium |

| 3 December 2025 | Karacabey Belediye Spor (3) | **1–2** | **Kocaelispor (1)** | Bursa |
| 15:30 | Bilin 90+1' | Report | Gedik 5'; Sagat 41' | Stadium: Karacabey Mustafa Fehmi Gerçeker Stadium |

| 3 December 2025 | **Beyoğlu Yeniçarşıspor (3)** | **1–0** | Göztepe (1) | Istanbul |
| 18:00 | Zeren 10' | Report | | Stadium: Atatürk Olympic Stadium |

| 3 December 2025 | **Trabzonspor (1)** | **2–0** | Van Spor FK (2) | Trabzon |
| 20:30 | Sikan 65'; Çavuşoğlu 84' (o.g.) | Report | | Stadium: Papara Park |

| 4 December 2025 | Yalova FK 77 (4) | **0–2** | **Gaziantep FK (1)** | Yalova |
| 13:00 | | Report | Boateng 41' (pen.); Sorescu 60' | Stadium: Yalova Atatürk Stadium |

| 4 December 2025 | **Boluspor (2)** | **2–1** | Kahta 02 Spor (5) | Bolu |
| 13:30 | Usluoğlu 37'; Boakye 90+6' | Report | Akar 75' | Stadium: Bolu Atatürk Stadium |

| 4 December 2025 | **Fethiyespor (3)** | **4–1** | Bandırmaspor (2) | Muğla |
| 13:30 | Akyüz 3'; Ayhan 26'; Kazan 69'; Asatekin 84' | Report | Samake 18' | Stadium: Fethiye İlçe Stadium |

| 3 December 2025 | Muğlaspor (3) | **1–2** | **Bodrum FK (2)** | Muğla |
| 13:30 | Erkasap 21' | Report | Tarım 55'; Habeşoğlu 90+1' | Stadium: Muğla Atatürk Stadium |

| 4 December 2025 | **Iğdır FK (2)** | **3–2** | Orduspor 1967 SK (4) | Iğdır |
| 15:30 | Özcan 35'; Koita 84' (pen.); Bruno 89' (pen.) | Report | Beytaş 8'; Arslantaş 41' | Stadium: Iğdır Şehir Stadium |

| 4 December 2025 | Silifke Belediye Spor (4) | **0–1** | **Antalyaspor (1)** | Mersin |
| 18:00 | | Report | Ballet 19' | Stadium: Silifke Şehir Stadium |

| 4 December 2025 | Çorum FK (2) | **0–5** | **Alanyaspor (1)** | Çorum |
| 20:30 | | Report | Ogundu 3'; Mounie 10', 33', 38', 85' | Stadium: Çorum Şehir Stadium |

=== Upsets ===
| Giantkiller | Opponent (tier) |
Upset of two leagues above
| **Beyoğlu Yeniçarşıspor (level 3)** | 1–0 at home vs Göztepe (level 1) |

== Group stage ==
15 Super League, 6 First League, and 3 Second League teams competed in this round. The draw was held on 5 December 2025 to determine the groups. The match schedules for the first round of matches were announced on 9 December 2025. The match schedules for the second round of matches were announced on 22 December 2025. The match schedules for the third round of matches were announced on 20 January 2026. The match schedules for the fourth round of matches were announced on 16 February 2026.

=== Tiebreakers ===
If two or more teams finished the group stage with the same number of points, the final ranking was determined by applying the following criteria in order:

1. Overall goal difference in the group stage.
2. The number of goals scored in the group stage.
3. The number of goals scored away.
4. The number of wins in the group stage.
5. The number of away wins.
6. The team with fewer disciplinary points. Disciplinary points were calculated by adding 3 (three) points for each red card and 1 (one) point for each yellow card. Only cards received by players in group stage matches were taken into account. In the case of a red card shown as a result of two yellow cards, no additional disciplinary points were added to the yellow-card score.
7. The team ranked higher in the seeding system.

Number of teams per tier still in competition
| Super League | First League | Second League | Third League | Amateur League | Total |
|---|---|---|---|---|---|
| 15 / 18 | 6 / 20 | 3 / 37 | 0 / 64 | 0 / 16 | 24 / 155 |

=== Pots ===
| Pot 1 | | Pot 2 | | Pot 3 | | Pot 4 | |
| Rank | Team | Rank | Team | Rank | Team | Rank | Team |
|---|---|---|---|---|---|---|---|
| **1** | **Galatasaray** | **7** | **Trabzonspor** | 16 | Kocaelispor | 26 | Boluspor |
| **2** | **Fenerbahçe** | 9 | Rizespor | **17** | **Gençlerbirliği** | 27 | Iğdır |
| **3** | **Samsunspor** | **11** | **Konyaspor** | 18 | Fatih Karagümrük | 33 | Keçiörengücü |
| **4** | **Beşiktaş** | **12** | **Alanyaspor** | 19 | Bodrum | 52 | Beyoğlu Yeni Çarşı |
| 5 | Başakşehir | 14 | Gaziantep | 23 | İstanbulspor | 57 | Fethiyespor |
| 6 | Eyüpspor | 15 | Antalyaspor | 25 | Erzurumspor | 72 | Aliağa |

Names in Bold indicate teams qualifying for the next round.

=== Groups ===
==== Group A ====
| Pos | Team | Pld | W | D | L | GF | GA | GD | Pts | Qualification | GAL | TRA | ALA | BAŞ | KAR | BOL | İST | FET |
|---|---|---|---|---|---|---|---|---|---|---|---|---|---|---|---|---|---|---|
| 1 | Galatasaray | 4 | 4 | 0 | 0 | 8 | 3 | +5 | 12 | Quarter-finals | | | | 1–0 | | | 3–1 | |
| 2 | Trabzonspor | 4 | 3 | 0 | 1 | 13 | 4 | +9 | 9 | Quarter-finals | | | 0–1 | | | | | 3–0 |
| 3 | Alanyaspor | 4 | 2 | 1 | 1 | 8 | 4 | +4 | 7 | Quarter-finals | 1–2 | | | | 2–2 | | | |
| 4 | Başakşehir | 4 | 2 | 0 | 2 | 8 | 7 | +1 | 6 | | | 2–4 | | | | 2–1 | | |
| 5 | Fatih Karagümrük | 4 | 1 | 2 | 1 | 5 | 6 | −1 | 5 | | | | | 1–4 | | | 0–0 | |
| 6 | Boluspor | 4 | 0 | 2 | 2 | 1 | 6 | −5 | 2 | | | | 0–4 | | | | | 0–0 |
| 7 | İstanbulspor | 4 | 0 | 2 | 2 | 2 | 9 | −7 | 2 | | | 1–6 | | | | 0–0 | | |
| 8 | Fethiyespor | 4 | 0 | 1 | 3 | 1 | 7 | −6 | 1 | | 1–2 | | | | 0–2 | | | |

Source: TFF.org
Legend: Blue = home team win; Yellow = draw; Red = away team win.

| 17 December 2025 | **Fatih Karagümrük** | **0–0** | **İstanbulspor** | Istanbul |
| 15:00 | | Report | | Stadium: Atatürk Olympic Stadium |

| 17 December 2025 | **Trabzonspor** | **0–1** | **Alanyaspor** | Trabzon |
| 20:30 | | Report | Yalçın 17' | Stadium: Papara Park |

| 18 December 2025 | **Galatasaray** | **1–0** | **Başakşehir** | Istanbul |
| 20:30 | Kutucu 22' | Report | | Stadium: Rams Park |

| 24 December 2025 | **Boluspor** | **0–0** | **Fethiyespor** | Bolu |
| 15:30 | | Report | | Stadium: Bolu Atatürk Stadium |

| 13 January 2026 | **Alanyaspor** | **2–2** | **Fatih Karagümrük** | Antalya |
| 13:00 | Hadergjonaj 16', 74' (pen.) | Report | Fofana 28', 59' (pen.) | Stadium: Alanya Oba Stadium |

| 13 January 2026 | **Başakşehir** | **2–1** | **Boluspor** | Istanbul |
| 15:30 | Opoku 23'; Da Costa 84' | Report | Usluoğlu 45' | Stadium: Başakşehir Fatih Terim Stadium |

| 13 January 2026 | **Fethiyespor** | **1–2** | **Galatasaray** | Muğla |
| 20:30 | Ayhan 90' | Report | Bardakcı 73'; Yılmaz 80' | Stadium: Fethiye İlçe Stadium |

| 14 January 2026 | **İstanbulspor** | **1–6** | **Trabzonspor** | Istanbul |
| 18:00 | Krstovski 29' | Report | Muçi 41', 60'; Batagov 57'; Olaigbe 70'; Sikan 85', 90+1' | Stadium: Esenyurt Necmi Kadıoğlu Stadium |

| 3 February 2026 | **Trabzonspor** | **3–0** | **Fethiyespor** | Trabzon |
| 20:30 | Muçi 69'; Onuachu 77'; Nwakaeme 79' | Report | | Stadium: Papara Park |

| 4 February 2026 | **Boluspor** | **0–4** | **Alanyaspor** | Bolu |
| 13:00 | | Report | Hagi 47', 57'; Mounie 60', 68' | Stadium: Bolu Atatürk Stadium |

| 4 February 2026 | **Fatih Karagümrük** | **1–4** | **Başakşehir** | Istanbul |
| 15:30 | Kone 79' | Report | Fayzullayev 8'; Shomurodov 22'; Crespo 50'; Brnic 65' | Stadium: Atatürk Olympic Stadium |

| 4 February 2026 | **Galatasaray** | **3–1** | **İstanbulspor** | Istanbul |
| 20:30 | Icardi 6'; Torreira 25'; Kutucu 33' | Report | Mamadou 26' | Stadium: Rams Park |

| 3 March 2026 | **Fethiyespor** | **0–2** | **Fatih Karagümrük** | Muğla |
| 13:00 | | Report | Kalaycı 40'; Kone 47' | Stadium: Fethiye İlçe Stadium |

| 3 March 2026 | **İstanbulspor** | **0–0** | **Boluspor** | Istanbul |
| 15:30 | | Report | | Stadium: Esenyurt Necmi Kadıoğlu Stadium |

| 3 March 2026 | **Alanyaspor** | **1–2** | **Galatasaray** | Antalya |
| 20:30 | Mounié 78' | Report | Yılmaz 6' (pen.); Nhaga 29' | Stadium: Alanya Oba Stadium |

| 3 March 2026 | **Başakşehir** | **2–4** | **Trabzonspor** | Istanbul |
| 20:30 | Costa 46'; Brnić 66' | Report | Augusto 6'; Eskihellaç 70'; Onuachu 84'; Tufan 85' | Stadium: Başakşehir Fatih Terim Stadium |

==== Group B ====
| Pos | Team | Pld | W | D | L | GF | GA | GD | Pts | Qualification | SAM | KON | GEN | IĞD | EYÜ | BOD | ALİ | ANT |
|---|---|---|---|---|---|---|---|---|---|---|---|---|---|---|---|---|---|---|
| 1 | Samsunspor | 4 | 4 | 0 | 0 | 12 | 3 | +9 | 12 | Quarter-finals | | | | | 2–1 | 2–0 | | |
| 2 | Konyaspor | 4 | 4 | 0 | 0 | 9 | 1 | +8 | 12 | Quarter-finals | | | | | | | 5–0 | 1–0 |
| 3 | Gençlerbirliği | 4 | 3 | 1 | 0 | 9 | 5 | +4 | 10 | Quarter-finals | | | | | 2–2 | 3–2 | | |
| 4 | Iğdır | 4 | 1 | 2 | 1 | 9 | 4 | +5 | 5 | | | | | | | | 2–2 | 6–0 |
| 5 | Eyüpspor | 4 | 1 | 1 | 2 | 5 | 6 | −1 | 4 | | | 0–1 | | 2–1 | | | | |
| 6 | Bodrum | 4 | 0 | 1 | 3 | 3 | 7 | −4 | 1 | | | 1–2 | | 0–0 | | | | |
| 7 | Aliağa | 4 | 0 | 1 | 3 | 5 | 16 | −11 | 1 | | 2–6 | | 1–3 | | | | | |
| 8 | Antalyaspor | 4 | 0 | 0 | 4 | 0 | 10 | −10 | 0 | | 0–2 | | 0–1 | | | | | |

Source: TFF.org
Legend: Blue = home team win; Yellow = draw; Red = away team win.

| 18 December 2025 | **Gençlerbirliği** | **3–2** | **Bodrum** | Ankara |
| 17:30 | Niang 59', 69'; Onur 67' | Report | Türk 19'; Habeşoğlu 51' | Stadium: Eryaman Stadium |

| 23 December 2025 | **Konyaspor** | **1–0** | **Antalyaspor** | Konya |
| 18:30 | Taşçı 21' | Report | | Stadium: Konya Metropolitan Municipality Stadium |

| 24 December 2025 | **Iğdır** | **2–2** | **Aliağa** | Iğdır |
| 13:00 | Özcan 38'; Rotariu 73' | Report | Çetin 37'; Özek 90' | Stadium: Iğdır Şehir Stadium |

| 24 December 2025 | **Samsunspor** | **2–1** | **Eyüpspor** | Samsun |
| 20:30 | Mouandilmadji 10'; Aydoğdu 33' | Report | Baran 90' | Stadium: Samsun 19 Mayıs Stadium |

| 14 January 2026 | **Aliağa** | **2–6** | **Samsunspor** | İzmir |
| 13:00 | Süleyman 37'; Karaahmet 80' | Report | Mouandilmadji 1'; Kayan 16', 51'; Yüksel 38'; Bülbül 40'; Yaldır 77' | Stadium: Aliağa Atatürk Stadium |

| 14 January 2026 | **Antalyaspor** | **0–1** | **Gençlerbirliği** | Antalya |
| 15:30 | | Report | Zuzek 89' | Stadium: Antalya Stadium |

| 15 January 2026 | **Eyüpspor** | **2–1** | **Iğdır** | Istanbul |
| 15:30 | Bozok 45+2' (pen.), 86' | Report | Özcan 26' | Stadium: Pendik Stadium |

| 15 January 2026 | **Bodrum** | **1–2** | **Konyaspor** | Muğla |
| 18:00 | Bilsel 56' | Report | Bjorlo 45'; Svendsen 79' | Stadium: Bodrum İlçe Stadium |

| 3 February 2026 | **Iğdır** | **6–0** | **Antalyaspor** | Iğdır |
| 13:00 | Conte 12', 24'; Suarez 16'; Rotariu 31'; Özcan 50'; Bruno 85' | Report | | Stadium: Iğdır Şehir Stadium |

| 3 February 2026 | **Samsunspor** | **2–0** | **Bodrum** | Samsun |
| 15:30 | Mouandilmadji 48', 90+3' | Report | | Stadium: Samsun 19 Mayıs Stadium |

| 4 February 2026 | **Gençlerbirliği** | **2–2** | **Eyüpspor** | Ankara |
| 18:00 | Varesanovic 12'; Kemaloğlu 24' (pen.) | Report | Quinones 34', 44' | Stadium: Eryaman Stadium |

| 5 February 2026 | **Konyaspor** | **5–0** | **Aliağa** | Konya |
| 15:30 | Muleka 4'; Taşçı 6', 44'; Bardhi 81'; Adar 88' (o.g.) | Report | | Stadium: Konya Metropolitan Municipality Stadium |

| 5 March 2026 | **Aliağa** | **1–3** | **Gençlerbirliği** | İzmir |
| 20:30 | | Report | | Stadium: Aliağa Atatürk Stadium |

| 5 March 2026 | **Antalyaspor** | **0–2** | **Samsunspor** | Antalya |
| 20:30 | | Report | | Stadium: Antalya Stadium |

| 5 March 2026 | **Bodrum** | **0–0** | **Iğdır** | Muğla |
| 20:30 | | Report | | Stadium: Bodrum İlçe Stadium |

| 5 March 2026 | **Eyüpspor** | **0–1** | **Konyaspor** | Istanbul |
| 20:30 | | Report | | Stadium: Recep Tayyip Erdoğan Stadium |

==== Group C ====
| Pos | Team | Pld | W | D | L | GF | GA | GD | Pts | Qualification | BEŞ | FEN | ERZ | GAZ | KOC | RİZ | BEY | KEÇ |
|---|---|---|---|---|---|---|---|---|---|---|---|---|---|---|---|---|---|---|
| 1 | Beşiktaş | 4 | 3 | 1 | 0 | 10 | 3 | +7 | 10 | Quarter-finals | | | | | | 4–1 | | 3–0 |
| 2 | Fenerbahçe | 4 | 3 | 0 | 1 | 9 | 3 | +6 | 9 | Quarter-finals | 1–2 | | 3–1 | | | | | |
| 3 | Erzurumspor | 4 | 2 | 0 | 2 | 8 | 8 | 0 | 6 | | | | | | | 2–0 | | 4–2 |
| 4 | Gaziantep | 4 | 2 | 0 | 2 | 8 | 10 | −2 | 6 | | | 0–4 | | | 1–0 | | | |
| 5 | Kocaelispor | 4 | 1 | 1 | 2 | 4 | 4 | 0 | 4 | | 1–1 | | 3–1 | | | | | |
| 6 | Rizespor | 4 | 1 | 1 | 2 | 7 | 9 | −2 | 4 | | | | | 5–2 | | | 1–1 | |
| 7 | Beyoğlu Yeni Çarşı | 4 | 1 | 1 | 2 | 3 | 5 | −2 | 4 | | | 0–1 | | | 1–0 | | | |
| 8 | Keçiörengücü | 4 | 1 | 0 | 3 | 6 | 13 | −7 | 3 | | | | | 1–5 | | | 3–1 | |

Source: TFF.org
Legend: Blue = home team win; Yellow = draw; Red = away team win.

| 17 December 2025 | **Rizespor** | **5–2** | **Gaziantep** | Rize |
| 18:00 | Dervişoğlu 2', 20', 60' (pen.), 71'; Bulut 64' | Report | Sorescu 38'; Güler 90+1' | Stadium: Rize City Stadium |

| 23 December 2025 | **Kocaelispor** | **3–1** | **Erzurumspor** | Kocaeli |
| 15:00 | Churlinov 18', 45'; Boende 53' | Report | Baiye 88' | Stadium: Kocaeli Stadium |

| 23 December 2025 | **Fenerbahçe** | **1–2** | **Beşiktaş** | Istanbul |
| 20:30 | Asensio 43' (pen.) | Report | Cerny 33', 90+1' | Stadium: Şükrü Saracoğlu Stadium |

| 24 December 2025 | **Keçiörengücü** | **3–1** | **Beyoğlu Yeni Çarşı** | Ankara |
| 18:00 | Ayan 17'; Akman 37'; Develi 80' | Report | Eren 59' | Stadium: Eryaman Stadium |

| 13 January 2026 | **Gaziantep** | **1–0** | **Kocaelispor** | Gaziantep |
| 18:00 | Lungoyi 87' | Report | | Stadium: Gaziantep Stadium |

| 14 January 2026 | **Beyoğlu Yeni Çarşı** | **0–1** | **Fenerbahçe** | Istanbul |
| 20:30 | | Report | Talisca 82' | Stadium: Recep Tayyip Erdoğan Stadium |

| 15 January 2026 | **Erzurumspor** | **2–0** | **Rizespor** | Erzurum |
| 13:00 | Tozlu 42'; Sarıkaya 54' | Report | | Stadium: Kazım Karabekir Stadium |

| 15 January 2026 | **Beşiktaş** | **3–0** | **Keçiörengücü** | Istanbul |
| 20:30 | Abraham 15'; Toure 55'; Yılmaz 87' | Report | | Stadium: Beşiktaş Stadium |

| 3 February 2026 | **Rizespor** | **1–1** | **Beyoğlu Yeni Çarşı** | Rize |
| 18:00 | Antalyalı 56' (pen.) | Report | Kurtoğlu 7' | Stadium: Rize City Stadium |

| 5 February 2026 | **Keçiörengücü** | **1–5** | **Gaziantep** | Ankara |
| 13:00 | Akman 6' (pen.) | Report | Lungoyi 3'; Sangaré 29'; Drăguș 41' (pen.), 65'; Akmelek 83' (pen.) | Stadium: Aktepe Stadium |

| 5 February 2026 | **Kocaelispor** | **1–1** | **Beşiktaş** | Kocaeli |
| 18:00 | Dursun 18' (pen.) | Report | Kökçü 88' (pen.) | Stadium: Kocaeli Stadium |

| 5 February 2026 | **Fenerbahçe** | **3–1** | **Erzurumspor** | Istanbul |
| 20:30 | Asensio 52'; Talisca 69', 78' (pen.) | Report | Fettahoğlu 40' | Stadium: Şükrü Saracoğlu Stadium |

| 4 March 2026 | **Erzurumspor** | **4–2** | **Keçiörengücü** | Erzurum |
| 14:30 | Yener 3'; Sylla 49'; Sever 79'; Billor 90+3' | Report | Yılmaz 35' (pen.); Çelik 45+1' | Stadium: Kazım Karabekir Stadium |

| 4 March 2026 | **Beşiktaş** | **4–1** | **Rizespor** | Istanbul |
| 20:30 | Murillo 27'; Uçan 38'; Oh 42'; Yılmaz 81' | Report | Papanikolaou 85' | Stadium: Beşiktaş Stadium |

| 4 March 2026 | **Beyoğlu Yeni Çarşı** | **1–0** | **Kocaelispor** | Istanbul |
| 20:30 | Kurtoğlu 57' | Report | | Stadium: Atatürk Olympic Stadium |

| 4 March 2026 | **Gaziantep** | **0–4** | **Fenerbahçe** | Gaziantep |
| 20:30 | | Report | Musaba 33'; Cherif 52'; Nene 79'; Brown 86' | Stadium: Gaziantep Stadium |

=== Ranking of runners-up ===
| Pos | Team | Pld | W | D | L | GF | GA | GD | Pts | Qualification |
|---|---|---|---|---|---|---|---|---|---|---|
| 1 | Konyaspor | 4 | 4 | 0 | 0 | 9 | 1 | +8 | **12** | Seeded in quarter-finals |
| 2 | Trabzonspor | 4 | 3 | 0 | 1 | 13 | 4 | +9 | **9** | |
| 3 | Fenerbahçe | 4 | 3 | 0 | 1 | 9 | 3 | +6 | **9** | |

Source: TFF.org

=== Ranking of third-placed teams ===
| Pos | Team | Pld | W | D | L | GF | GA | GD | Pts | Qualification |
|---|---|---|---|---|---|---|---|---|---|---|
| 1 | Gençlerbirliği | 4 | 3 | 1 | 0 | 9 | 5 | +4 | **10** | Quarter-finals |
| 2 | Alanyaspor | 4 | 2 | 1 | 1 | 8 | 4 | +4 | **7** | Quarter-finals |
| 3 | Erzurumspor | 4 | 2 | 0 | 2 | 8 | 8 | 0 | **6** | |

Source: TFF.org

== Bracket ==
Quarter-finals
Galatasaray | 0
Gençlerbirliği | 2
Samsunspor | 0 (1)
Trabzonspor (p) | 0 (3)
Beşiktaş | 3
Alanyaspor | 0
Konyaspor (a.e.t.) | 1
Fenerbahçe | 0

Semi-finals
Gençlerbirliği | 1
Trabzonspor | 2
Beşiktaş | 0
Konyaspor | 1

Final
Trabzonspor | 2
Konyaspor | 1

== Quarter-finals ==
=== Seedings ===
| Seeded | | Unseeded | |
| Qualification | Team | Qualification | Team |
|---|---|---|---|
| Group A winners | Galatasaray | Second runners-up | Trabzonspor |
| Group B winners | Samsunspor | Worst runners-up | Fenerbahçe |
| Group C winners | Beşiktaş | Best third-placed team | Gençlerbirliği |
| Best runners-up | Konyaspor | Second third-placed team | Alanyaspor |

=== Matches ===
The quarter-finals were played in a single-match elimination format between the top two teams from each group and the two best third-place teams. The draw was held on 11 March 2026. The match schedules were announced on 27 March 2026.

| 21 April 2026 | Konyaspor | 1–0 (a.e.t.) | Fenerbahçe | Konya |
| 20:30 | Jevtovic 120+2' (pen.) | Report | | Stadium: Konya Metropolitan Municipality Stadium |

| 22 April 2026 | Galatasaray | 0–2 | Gençlerbirliği | Istanbul |
| 20:30 | | Report | Üzüm 51'; Traoré 83' | Stadium: Rams Park |

| 23 April 2026 | Samsunspor | 0–0 (a.e.t.) (1–3 p) | Trabzonspor | Samsun |
| 18:45 | | Report | | Stadium: Samsun 19 Mayıs Stadium |
| | Penalties |
| | Satka (penalty missed); Mouandilmadji (penalty missed); Çift (penalty missed); Tomasson (penalty scored) | | (penalty scored) Onuachu; (penalty missed) Eskihellaç; (penalty missed) Bouchouari; (penalty scored) Nwakaeme; (penalty scored) Muçi |

| 23 April 2026 | Beşiktaş | 3–0 | Alanyaspor | Istanbul |
| 20:45 | Touré 17'; Oh 83'; Kökçü 85' | Report | | Stadium: Beşiktaş Stadium |

== Semi-finals ==
=== Matches ===
The 2026 UEFA Europa League final was hosted at Beşiktaş Stadium on 20 May 2026. Due to this match, the stadium had to be handed over to UEFA after 10 May 2026. Since Beşiktaş advanced to the semi-finals of the Turkish Cup, their semi-final match, originally scheduled for 12–14 May 2026, was moved up to 5 May 2026. The other semi-final match was played as previously announced, on 13 May. The match schedules were announced on 24 April 2026.

| 5 May 2026 | Beşiktaş | 0–1 | Konyaspor | Istanbul |
| 20:30 | | Report | Bardhi 90+8' (pen.) | Stadium: Beşiktaş Stadium |

| 13 May 2026 | Gençlerbirliği | 1–2 | Trabzonspor | Ankara |
| 20:30 | Aslan 62' | Report | Çelik 78' (o.g.); Muçi 90+2' | Stadium: Eryaman Stadium |

== Final ==
On 29 April 2026, the TFF announced that the final would take place at Antalya Stadium in Antalya, Turkey.

22 May 2026
20:45 TRT

| Trabzonspor | 2–1 | Konyaspor |
|---|---|---|
| Onuachu 18', 79' (pen.) | Report | Muleka 50' |

Antalya Stadium, Antalya
Referee: Halil Umut Meler

== Top scorers ==
| Rank | Player | Club | Goals |
|---|---|---|---|
| 1 | (Benin) Steve Mounié | Alanyaspor | 7 |
| 2 | (Chad) Marius Mouandilmadji | Samsunspor | 5 |
| 2 | (Turkey) Uğur Ahmet Özder | Silifke Belediye Spor | 5 |
| 4 | (Turkey) Alperen Köşker | Giresunspor | 4 |
| 4 | (Mali) Cheikne Sylla | Erzurumspor | 4 |
| 4 | (Romania) Dorin Rotariu | Iğdır / Eyüpspor | 4 |
| 4 | (Albania) Ernest Muçi | Trabzonspor | 4 |
| 4 | (Turkey) Halil Dervişoğlu | Rizespor | 4 |
| 4 | (Turkey) Malik Karaahmet | Aliağa | 4 |
| 4 | (Turkey) Mert Can Yılmaz | Dersimspor | 4 |
| 4 | (Turkey) Oğuzhan Akgün | Muşspor | 4 |
| 4 | (Turkey) Özder Özcan | Iğdır | 4 |
| 4 | (Nigeria) Paul Onuachu | Trabzonspor | 4 |
| 4 | (Turkey) Samed Onur | Gençlerbirliği | 4 |
