= 2026 Turkish Cup final =

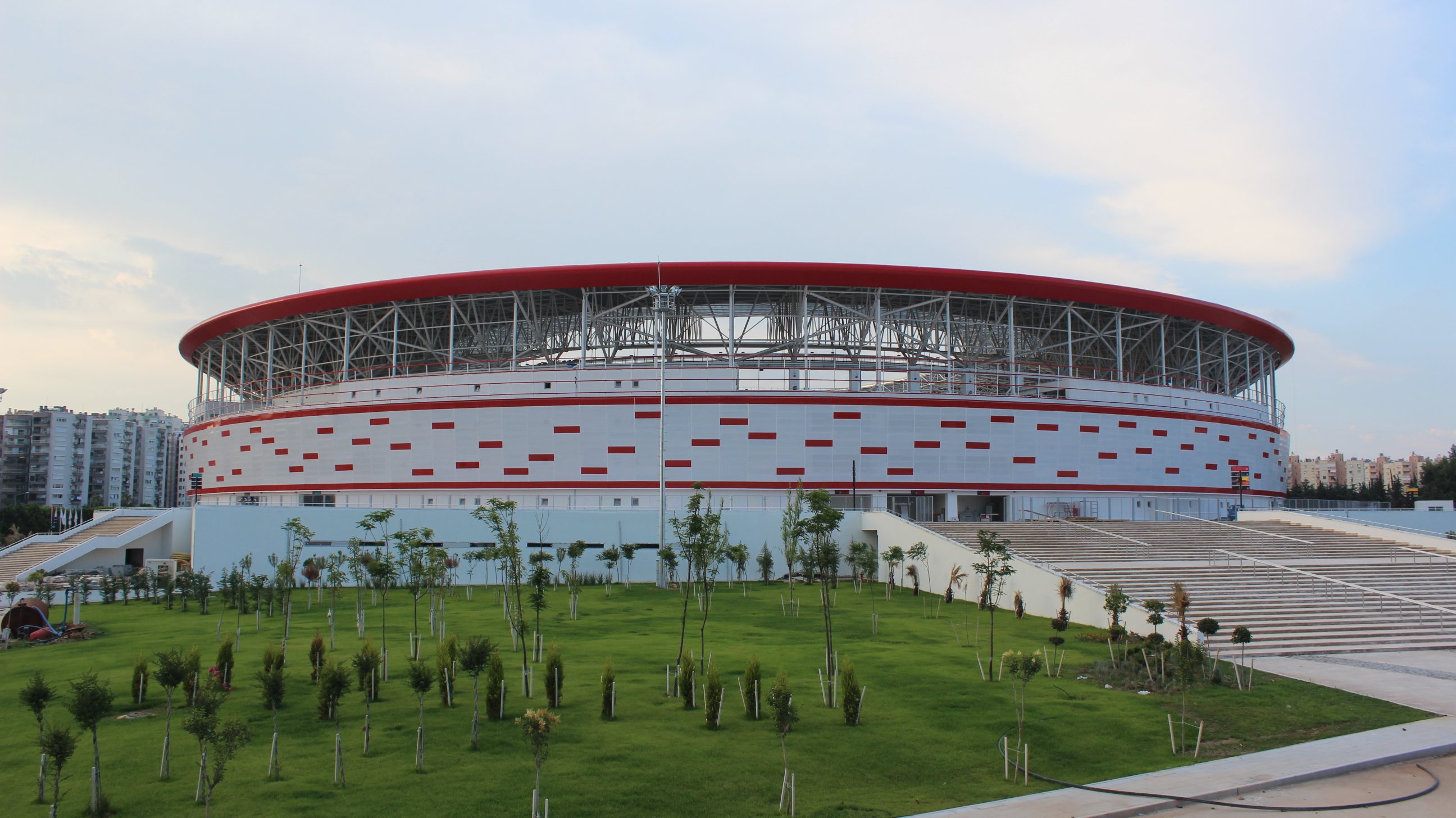
- Antalya Stadium hosted the final
- Event: 2025–26 Turkish Cup
Trabzonspor	Konyaspor
2	1
- Date: 22 May 2026
- Venue: Antalya Stadium, Antalya
- Referee: Halil Umut Meler

The 2026 Turkish Cup final was the decisive match of the 2025–26 Turkish Cup, the 64th edition of Turkey's primary football cup competition organized by the Turkish Football Federation (TFF). The final was played on 22 May 2026 at Antalya Stadium, and featured Trabzonspor and Konyaspor.

Trabzonspor won the match 2–1 for their 10th title, and first since 2019–20.

== Route to the final ==
Note: In all results below, the score of the finalist is given first (H: home; A: away).

Trabzonspor		Round	Konyaspor	
Opponent	Result	Qualifying round	Opponent	Result
Bye		Third round	12 Bingölspor	4–2 (H)
Van Spor FK	2–0 (H)	Fourth round	Muş Spor Kulübü	4–1 (A)
Opponent	Result	Group stage	Opponent	Result
Alanyaspor	0–1 (H)	Matchday 1	Antalyaspor	1–0 (H)
İstanbulspor	6–1 (A)	Matchday 2	Bodrum	2–1 (A)
Fethiyespor	3–0 (H)	Matchday 3	Aliağa	5–0 (H)
Başakşehir	4–2 (A)	Matchday 4	Eyüpspor	1–0 (A)
Group A runners-up: Pos / Team / Pld / Pts; 1 / Galatasaray / 4 / 12; 2 / Trabzonspor / 4 / 9; 3 / Alanyaspor / 4 / 7; 4 / Başakşehir / 4 / 6; 5 / Fatih Karagümrük / 4 / 5; 6 / Boluspor / 4 / 2; 7 / İstanbulspor / 4 / 2; 8 / Fethiyespor / 4 / 1; Source: TFF.org		Final standings	Group B runners-up: Pos / Team / Pld / Pts; 1 / Samsunspor / 4 / 12; 2 / Konyaspor / 4 / 12; 3 / Gençlerbirliği / 4 / 10; 4 / Iğdır / 4 / 5; 5 / Eyüpspor / 4 / 4; 6 / Bodrum / 4 / 1; 7 / Aliağa / 4 / 1; 8 / Antalyaspor / 4 / 0; Source: TFF.org	
Opponent	Result	Knockout phase	Opponent	Result
Samsunspor	0–0 (a.e.t.) (3–1 p) (A)	Quarter-finals	Fenerbahçe	1–0 (a.e.t.) (H)
Gençlerbirliği	2–1 (A)	Semi-finals	Beşiktaş	1–0 (A)

== Match ==
=== Details ===
22 May 2026
20:45 TRT

Trabzonspor	2–1	Konyaspor
Onuachu 18', 79' (pen.)	Report	Muleka 50'

Antalya Stadium, Antalya
Referee: Halil Umut Meler

Trabzonspor	Konyaspor

GK	24	(Cameroon) André Onana
RB	20	(Cape Verde) Wagner Pina	(yellow card) 83'
CB	27	(Nigeria) Chibuike Nwaiwu	(yellow card) 90+1'
CB	15	(Montenegro) Stefan Savić (c)	(yellow card) 45+4'	(substituted off) 57'
LB	19	(Turkey) Mustafa Eskihellaç
CM	8	(Morocco) Benjamin Bouchouari	(yellow card) 45+1'
CM	26	(France) Tim Jabol-Folcarelli
RW	22	(Ukraine) Oleksandr Zubkov		(substituted off) 90+2'
AM	10	(Albania) Ernest Muçi		(substituted off) 90+2'
LW	99	(Brazil) Felipe Augusto		(substituted off) 90+5'
FW	30	(Nigeria) Paul Onuachu	(yellow card) 80'
Substitutes:
GK	25	(Turkey) Onuralp Çevikkan
GK	88	(Turkey) Ahmet Yıldırım
DF	14	(Norway) Mathias Løvik
MF	11	(Turkey) Ozan Tufan		(substituted on) 57'
MF	17	(Turkey) Onuralp Çakıroğlu
MF	42	(Ivory Coast) Christ Inao Oulaï	(yellow card) 90+5'	(substituted on) 90+2'
MF	74	(Turkey) Salih Malkoçoğlu		(substituted on) 90+2'
MF	80	(Turkey) Boran Başkan
FW	9	(Nigeria) Anthony Nwakaeme
FW	18	(Turkey) Umut Nayir		(substituted on) 90+5'
Manager:
(Turkey) Fatih Tekke

GK	13	(Turkey) Bahadır Han Güngördü
RB	39	(Burkina Faso) Adamo Nagalo
CB	5	(Turkey) Uğurcan Yazğılı	(yellow card) 22'
CB	4	(Turkey) Adil Demirbağ (c)	(yellow card) 90+2'
LB	18	(Turkey) Berkan Kutlu	(yellow card) 83'
CM	77	(Turkey) Melih İbrahimoğlu
CM	16	(Serbia) Marko Jevtović	(yellow card) 45+7'	(substituted off) 85'
RW	9	(Turkey) Deniz Türüç	(yellow card) 60'
AM	17	(Portugal) Diogo Gonçalves	(yellow card) 66'	(substituted off) 89'
LW	10	(North Macedonia) Enis Bardhi		(substituted off) 80'
FW	40	(Democratic Republic of the Congo) Jackson Muleka
Substitutes:
GK	1	(Turkey) Deniz Ertaş
DF	3	(Turkey) Yasir Subaşı
DF	22	(Turkey) Rayyan Baniya
DF	23	(Republic of the Congo) Yhoan Andzouana
DF	24	(Turkey) Arif Boşluk
MF	21	(South Korea) Jo Jin-ho
MF	32	(Norway) Sander Svendsen		(substituted on) 89'
MF	42	(Norway) Morten Bjørlo		(substituted on) 85'
MF	70	(Belgium) Kazeem Olaigbe
FW	99	(Slovenia) Blaž Kramer		(substituted on) 80'
Manager:
(Turkey) İlhan Palut
