= Atakan Cangöz =

Turkish footballer

Personal information
- Date of birth: 30 March 1992 (age 34)
- Place of birth: Bakırköy, Turkey
- Height: 1.75 m (5 ft 9 in)
- Position: Midfielder

Youth career
- 2003–2008: Gaziantep Büyükşehir Belediyespor
- 2008–2012: Antalyaspor

Senior career*
Years	Team	Apps	(Gls)
2012–2013	Antalyaspor	0	(0)
2012	→ Fethiyespor (loan)	12	(1)
2012–2013	→ Manavgatspor (loan)	0	(0)
2013–2015	Manavgatspor	34	(6)
2015–2019	Antalyaspor	1	(0)
2015	→ Etimesgut Belediyespor (loan)	4	(0)
2015–2016	→ Kızılcabölükspor (loan)	11	(1)
2017–2018	→ Kemerspor (loan)	28	(0)
2018–2019	→ Serik Belediyespor (loan)	29	(0)
2019–2022	Serik Belediyespor	83	(3)
2022–2026	Çorum	60	(1)
- * Club domestic league appearances and goals as of 14 August 2026

Atakan Cangöz (born 30 March 1992) is a Turkish professional footballer who plays as a midfielder.

== Professional career ==
After years on loan with various lower division Turkish teams, Cangöz made his professional debut for Antalyaspor in a 4-1 Süper Lig victory over Gaziantepspor on 2 June 2017.

On 13 November 2025, Cangöz was banned from playing for 6 months for his involvement in the 2025 Turkish football betting scandal.
