= 2025 Turkish football corruption and betting scandal =

The 2025 Turkish football corruption and betting scandal refers to a series of investigations into allegations of illegal sports betting involving referees, club executives and footballers in Turkish professional football that began on 27 October 2025, when the Turkish Football Federation announced that an internal audit found evidence suggesting widespread betting activity.

The scandal involves allegations that hundreds of referees and footballers had breached FIFA and UEFA integrity rules, prohibiting them in any capacity from gambling, including simply holding betting accounts.

By late 2026, the investigation had expanded to include the Central Referees Committee (MHK), with judicial inquiries and detentions concerning allegations of match manipulation and irregularities in referee classifications and appointments.

== Background ==
In early 2025, Turkish football faced increasing scrutiny. In February, FIFA-listed referee Yaşar Kemal Uğurlu resigned after being linked to gambling in a casino located in Northern Cyprus. In September, several referees filed criminal complaints against the TFF, alleging mobbing, unfair match assignments, and pressure to favor certain clubs, prompting judicial investigations. The TFF subsequently initiated an audit of referees' financial activities concerning potential betting violations.

In April 2025, the Istanbul Chief Public Prosecutor's Office initiated an investigation into betting involving several referees. As a result of this investigation, and after complaints were made by some referees, the Antalya Chief Public Prosecutor's Office opened an investigation into the MHK. Then, the case was moved to the Istanbul Chief Public Prosecutor's Office due to lack of jurisdiction. After that, the two investigations were combined and proceeded as one case.

On 30 September 2025, eighteen companies owned by Turgay Ciner, including Kasımpaşa and Ciner Media Group were seized and placed under the receivership of the TMSF (Savings Deposit Insurance Fund of Türkiye).

During his presidency, Fenerbahçe President Ali Koç repeatedly alleged the existence within Turkish football of a network he referred to as the yapı (“the structure”), particularly within the MHK and TFF. Koç claimed that the network influenced referee appointments, VAR decisions, and match outcomes, allegedly benefiting certain clubs and creating an unfair competitive environment.

According to Article 11 of Turkey's Law No. 6222 on Preventing Violence and Disorder in Sports (2011, amended 2017), the person responsible for the manipulation of the sporting event's result will be sentenced to 1 to 3 years of imprisonment and a penalty of up to 20,000 judicial days. The law provides penalties for offenses including match-fixing and bribery and applies to participants in sporting competitions, including referees and players. Penalties may increase to 5-12 years imprisonment under Article 11/3 if organized crime is involved.

According to the Turkish Football Disciplinary Regulations (FDT), penalties exceeding 45 days imposed on referees may result in the initiation of licence revocation proceedings.

== Timeline ==
According to Türkiye newspaper journalist Tahir Kum the investigation was initially launched following suspicious bets placed on the 2024–25 Second League match between Ankaraspor and Nazillispor in which neither team registered a shot. Kum stated in the news headline, "This incident began with the match between Ankaraspor and Nazillispor, and the high volume of betting on that match." On 11 September 2025, roughly 1.5 years after the match, the TFF imposed bans on two club presidents and 18 footballers after conducting an investigation.

=== October 2025 ===
The audit reported betting activity among referees that could constitute violations of applicable integrity rules. This audit included all 571 professional referees currently officiating in Turkey from every level of the sport. The audit found that 371, or 65%, of the active professional referees held registered betting accounts, which, according to FIFA and UEFA regulations, may constitute a violation as referees are prohibited from any gambling, and simply having a betting account is a violation.

Of these, 152 referees were found to have actively placed bets on football matches. This included both domestic competitions, like the Süper Lig and lower-tier Turkish leagues, and international fixtures. Among the implicated officials, seven were elite main referees from the Süper Lig, 15 were elite assistant referees, 36 were regional main referees, and 94 were regional assistant referees.

Hacıosmanoğlu described the findings as severe and indicative of long-standing governance issues. Ten referees were reported to have placed more than 10,000 bets each, with one referee reported to have placed 18,227 bets. 42 referees were found to have placed more than 1,000 wagers specifically on football matches.

Hacıosmanoğlu described the issue as systemic and stated that the federation intended to implement disciplinary and oversight measures. Under the TFF Disciplinary Code Article 57, gambling violations lead to penalties of three months to one-year bans. Furthermore, Hacıosmanoğlu announced plans for a referee training program emphasizing ethical compliance, enhanced oversight mechanisms, such as real-time monitoring of referee financial activities and collaboration with law enforcement to investigate potential match-fixing linked to betting patterns.

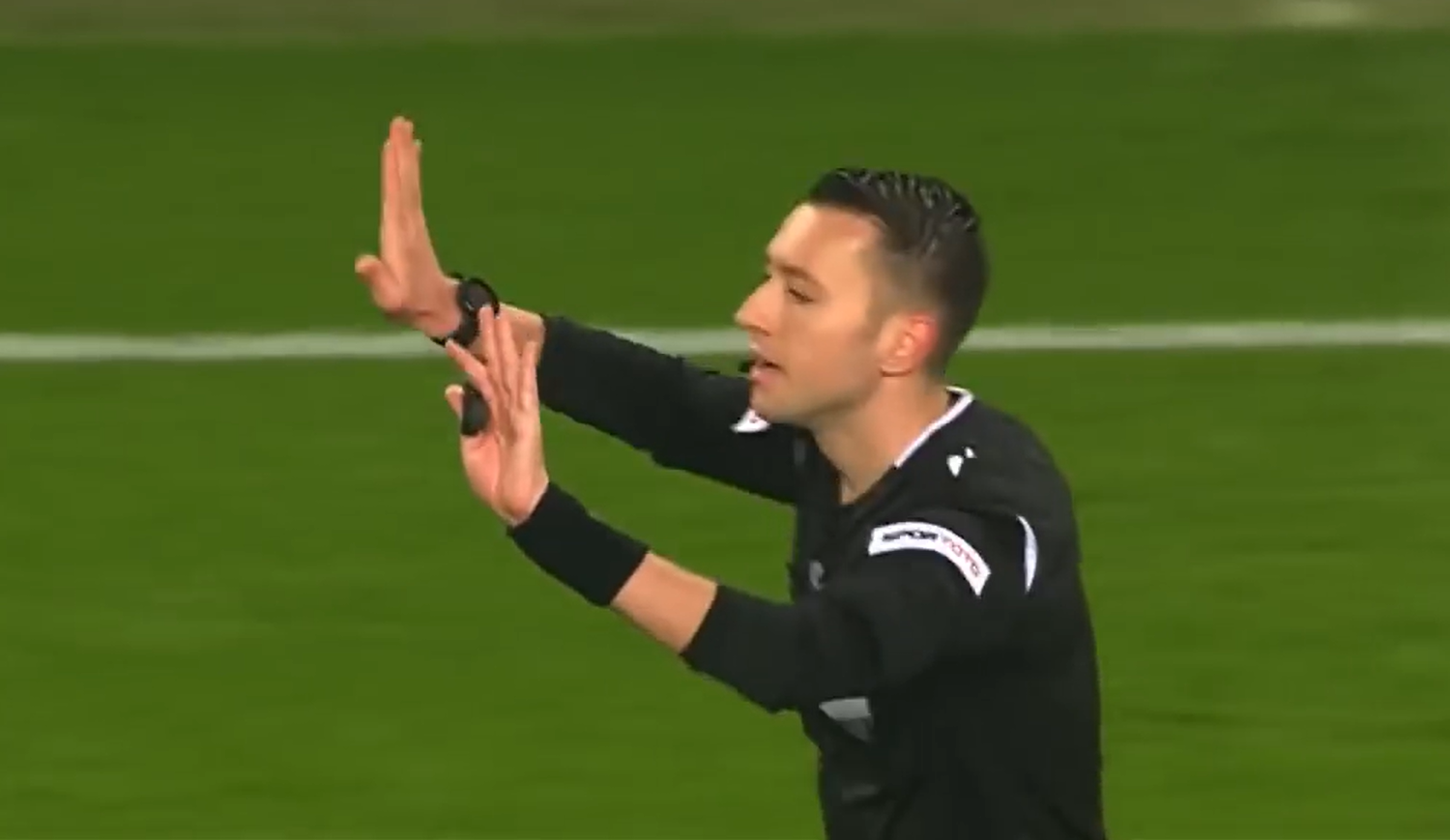
Zorbay Küçük, one of the referees referred to the PFDK as part of the investigation

Approximately 5 hours after Hacıosmanoğlu's press conference, journalist Murat Ağırel alleged on social media that MHK President Ferhat Gündoğdu had an active betting account. Furthermore, Kum claimed that a club president placed 3,057 bets and won 476 times, a masseur placed 2,399 bets and won 329 times, a footballer placed 1,950 bets and won 340 times, while another footballer and coaching staff members were found to have placed bets 15,987 times and won 3,138 times.

On 28 October, the TFF took disciplinary action against the 152 referees, referring them to the Professional Football Discipline Board (PFDK). Seven top flight main referees along the 152 were Zorbay Küçük, Egemen Artun, Mehmet Ali Özer, Melih Kurt, Muhammed Selim Özbek, Seyfettin Alper Yılmaz and Yunus Dursun.

Among the 7, Yunus Dursun and Egemen Artun were each given a 10-month ban, while Muhammed Selim Özbek, Mehmet Ali Özer and Seyfettin Alper Yılmaz were each given an 8-month ban. It was also decided to continue the investigation into the allegations of betting activities involving top-tier referees Zorbay Küçük and Melih Kurt and lower-tier referee Mertcan Tubay. The remaining 144 referees officiating in lower divisions were all punished with 8 to 12 month bans; due to these penalties exceeding 45 days, the refereeing rights of the 144 referees and 5 Süper Lig elite level referees were terminated.

Küçük's lawyer argued that two fake betting accounts had been opened in the referee's name and that his identity details had been stolen by a foreign individual. Küçük stated that he had never held an account with a betting site or placed any bets, either before or during his refereeing career.

On 31 October, during a political rally in Esenyurt, Republican People's Party (CHP) Chair Özgür Özel claimed that the red card shown to Göztepe player in a Süper Lig match against an undisclosed team was "unfairly issued" and correlated with a substantial bet. Özel claimed that 5.5 million TL was wagered on the Northern Cyprus red card that same day. Subsequently, the Istanbul Chief Public Prosecutor's Office launched an ex officio investigation on 31 October 2025 into the claims of illegal betting and potential match manipulation related to the match.

=== November 2025 ===
On 1 November, Beşiktaş announced that the club had applied to the Istanbul Chief Public Prosecutor's Office to participate as a party in the investigation.

On 6 November, the 152 suspended referees issued a collective statement vehemently denying that they ever placed bets on matches they officiated. They admitted some had participated in online betting years ago, during their amateur days, also accusing the federation of turning them into scapegoats in a politically charged operation.

On 7 November, a detention order was issued for a total of 21 individuals, 17 referees and the president of Süper Lig side Eyüpspor Murat Özkaya, former Kasımpaşa owner and fugitive Turgay Ciner and former club president Fatih Saraç whose terms ended on 30 September 2025, following a trustee appointment by the Turkish government. Saraç was released after his statement was taken.

On 10 November, eight suspects, including Eyüpspor Club President Özkaya and six referees, were arrested, while 11 suspects were released under judicial supervision.

On the same day, TFF announced that 1,024 footballers were referred to the PFDK on the grounds of betting, of the 1,024 players, 27 were Süper Lig players; while the other players referred were 77 from the First League, 282 from the Second League, 629 from the Third League, and 9 from amateur leagues.

The TFF postponed Second and Third League fixtures for two weeks, stating that the postponement would allow clubs to address gaps in their squads, while matches in the Süper Lig and First League would continue as previously announced.

Among the 1,024 players, the 27 Süper Lig footballers included were Beşiktaş's Necip Uysal and Ersin Destanoğlu, Alanyaspor's İzzet Çelik, Enes Keskin, Yusuf Özdemir and Bedirhan Özyurt, Rizespor's Efe Doğan and Furkan Orak, Galatasaray's Metehan Baltacı and Eren Elmalı, Gaziantep FK's Muhammet Taha Güneş and Nazım Sangare, Göztepe's Furkan Malak and Uğur Kaan Yıldız, Antalyaspor's Kerem Kayaarası, Eyüpspor's Mükremin Arda Türköz, Kasımpaşa's Ege Albayrak and Ali Emre Yanar, Fatih Karagümrük's Furkan Bekleviç and Kerem Yusuf Sirkeci, Samsunspor's Celil Yüksel, Trabzonspor's Boran Başkan and Salih Malkoçoğlu, Konyaspor's Adil Demirbağ and Alassane Ndao and Kayserispor's Berkan Aslan, Abdulsamet Burak.

Following his referral to the PFDK, Elmalı was removed from Türkiye's squad and replaced by Trabzonspor player Mustafa Eskihellaç. In addition to Elmalı's removal from the senior squad, İzzet Çelik was dropped from the under-21 team and Ege Albayrak from the under-19 squad.

Beşiktaş players Necip Uysal and goalkeeper Ersin Destanoğlu, denied the betting allegations and filed a criminal complaint on 11 November on the grounds that their identity information had been used. Destanoğlu stated, "Our federation shared our names without contacting us first, attempting to tarnish our reputations." Uysal also claimed that a betting account had been opened using his Turkish ID number. The charges against both players were dropped.

Elmalı admitted to betting on a game about five years ago that did not involve his own team.

On the programme "Kale Arkası" broadcast on TV100, journalist Haluk Yürekli claimed that Baltacı had placed 1,600 bets within the period when he was on loan at Eyüpspor. Baltacı admitted to betting 1,600 times on games that did not involve his own team.

On 13 November, PFDK imposed bans ranging from 45 days to 12 months on 102 footballers from the Süper Lig and the First League. Abdulsamet Burak from Kayserispor and Alassane Ndao from Konyaspor received the longest possible penalties of 12 months each, while Metehan Baltacı from Galatasaray and Yusuf Özdemir from Alanyaspor received 9-month bans; İzzet Çelik from Alanyaspor, Enes Keskin, Bedirhan Özyurt and Furkan Orak from Rizespor, Kerem Yusuf Sirkeci from Fatih Karagümrük, Berkan Aslan from Kayserispor and Boran Başkan from Trabzonspor received three-month bans, while the other 12 Süper Lig players received 45-day bans.

On 16 November, the Istanbul Chief Public Prosecutor's Office announced that the investigation could be expanded, and stated that referees' foreign contacts were being investigated and that financial analyses, technical monitoring and digital investigations were being carried out to prevent the laundering of criminal proceeds.

On 17 November, TFF announced that FIFA had rejected its request for an additional transfer window due to players receiving penalties, citing international transfer rules.

On 18 November, PFDK imposed bans ranging from 45 days to 12 months on 282 footballers playing in the Second League.

A day later, on 19 November, PFDK imposed bans ranging from 45 days to 12 months on 638 footballers playing in the Third League and amateur leagues.

=== December 2025 ===
On 5 December, the Istanbul Chief Public Prosecutor's Office issued arrest warrants for 46 suspects, including 27 footballers such as Galatasaray's Metehan Baltacı, Fenerbahçe's team captain Mert Hakan Yandaş and Konyaspor's Alassane Ndao, along with multiple club chairs and former executives, including Ankaraspor's chair Mehmet Emin Katipoğlu, Nazillispor's chair Şahin Kaya and Adana Demirspor's former chair Murat Sancak on charges of illegal betting. Former referee and commentator Ahmet Çakar and his wife Arzu Çakar, along with referee Zorbay Küçük were also taken into custody as part of an investigation into suspected financial irregularities in their bank accounts. It was also determined that six individuals, including one footballer, had agreed to influence the outcome of the Ümraniyespor-Giresunspor match played on 24 December 2023. Çakar was later released due to his health condition, specifically a heart spasm he experienced while in detention, which required an angiogram procedure.

Prosecutors stated that evidence indicated that Baltacı had placed bets on matches involving his own team, which he had previously denied.

On 8 December, 29 individuals: Ahmet Abdullah Çakmak, Eren Karadağ, Uğur Adem Gezer, Emrah Çelik, Yunus Emre Tekoğul, Metehan Baltacı, İzzet Furkan Malak, Bartu Kaya, Arda Türken, Muhammed Furkan Özhan, Yusuf Özdemir, Orkun Özdemir, Kadir Kaan Yurdakul, Faruk Can Genç, Alassane Ndao, Ensar Bilir, Oktay Aydın, Yücel Gürol, Mert Hakan Yandaş, Ersen Dikmen, Kerem Yusuf Sirkeci, Emircan Çiçek, Ahmet Okatan, Gürhan Sünmez, Mehmet Emin Katipoğlu, Volkan Erten, Şahin Kaya, and Ümit Kaya were referred to the court with a request for their arrest on charges of influencing a match result, while Murat Sancak was referred with a request for arrest on the charge of money laundering of criminal proceeds. 10 individuals; Zorbay Küçük, Abdulsamet Burak, Cengiz Demir, Erhan Çelenk, İsmail Kalburcu, Salih Malkoçoğlu, Samet Karabatak, Tolga Kalender, Uğur Kaan Yıldız, and Gamze Neli Kaya were referred to The Peace Courts with a request for them to be placed under judicial supervision. Among the 29, 20 individuals including Yandaş, Ndao, Sancak and Baltacı were arrested and remanded in custody.

According to the Financial Crimes Investigation Board (MASAK) report, Mert Hakan Yandaş frequently placed bets focusing particularly on player-specific bets such as İsmail Yüksek committing a minimum of 3 fouls, and Yüksek receiving a card. Mert Hakan Yandaş denied all the claims on his statement. Meanwhile, Metehan Baltacı, during his time at Eyüpspor and Galatasaray, placed 36 bets ranging from 5 TL to 1,800 TL. It was established that Baltacı did not feature in the 18 man squad for the matches he bet upon; and while at Galatasaray, his betting slips were placed on results such as "his own team to win" and "more than 2.5 goals to be scored," with no evidence found of him placing any wagers on the opposing team.

According to material included in the investigation file, images recovered from Yandaş's mobile phone appeared to show the virtual slot game Sweet Bonanza on an illegal betting site; Yandaş said that the images had been shared with friends for entertainment. In addition, WhatsApp messages from the phone of Yandaş, were included in the investigation file.According to the investigation file, messages concerning slot games and illegal betting sites were found in a WhatsApp group that included İrfan Can Kahveci, Cenk Tosun, Çağlar Söyüncü and Yandaş.

Yandaş playing the virtual slot game "Sweet Bonanza" on an illegal betting site

On the same day, TFF announced that 197 more footballers were referred to the PFDK on the grounds of betting.

On 9 December, TFF announced that 27 more footballers and 22 more referees with 2 of them refereeing in the top-flight; Fevzi Erdem Alba and Furkan Aksuoğlu were referred to the PFDK on the grounds of betting.

On 26 December, 26 individuals, 14 of whom were footballers, including former director of Galatasaray Erden Timur, TFF Administrative Director of International Relations and National Teams Buğra Cem İmamoğulları and Eyüpspor vice-president Fatih Kulaksız were taken into custody on the grounds of illegal betting and influencing a match result. Investigators examined six of the suspects in connection with betting patterns surrounding the 2024–25 Süper Lig match between Kasımpaşa and Samsunspor, in which Samsunspor's Olivier Ntcham missed two penalties within eight minutes and where unusual high-stakes wagers were placed on a specific "halftime/fulltime" outcome that correctly predicted Kasımpaşa leading at the half and Samsunspor winning the game.

On 29 December, 21 out of the 26 suspects, including Fatih Kulaksız and Erden Timur (former Vice President of Galatasaray), were arrested, while three suspects were referred to the court with a request for judicial supervision. İmamoğulları was released after providing a statement to the prosecutor, and the court noted that one suspect was already serving time for a separate offense.

=== January 2026 ===
On 7 January, TFF announced that 108 coaches including Mehmet Altıparmak, Gökhan Ünal and Hakan Keleş were referred to the PFDK on the grounds of betting.

On 9 January, TFF announced that 47 more coaches including Serdar Topraktepe, Can Arat, Ümit Davala and Olcan Adın were referred to the PFDK on the grounds of betting.

On 16 January, the TMSF were appointed trustees of eight companies belonging to Özkaya, including Eyüpspor.

On 29 January, former Adana Demirspor chairman Sancak was released from custody under house arrest.

=== February 2026 ===
Following its seizure by the TMSF on 30 September 2025, Kasımpaşa was acquired by Kazancı Holding on 5 February, transitioning the club back to private ownership.

On 12 February, TFF announced that 510 people including Galatasaray team doctor Yener İnce and Fenerbahçe translator Saruhan Karaman were referred to the PFDK on the grounds of betting.

On 17 February, during investigations into illegal betting in Istanbul, it was determined that the former president and managers of Tuzlaspor were owners of an illegal betting website. As a result of the investigations, operations were carried out in five provinces centred on Istanbul. Eight people were detained during the operations, and during the operation, Diyarbekirspor and three companies were seized in line with allegations that some of the proceeds of crime were being laundered through certain sports clubs. Investigations revealed that Fevzi İlhanlı, the former president of Diyarbekirspor and Tuzlaspor, and his executives owned an illegal betting site and transferred the income they earned through the club.

On 27 February, an indictment was filed against 34 suspects, including footballers Metehan Baltacı and Mert Hakan Yandaş, as well as Fenerbahçe Congress Member Ersen Dikmen, seeking prison sentences ranging from 4 to 13 years.

=== March 2026 ===
On 6 March, as part of the investigation, the TMSF was appointed as trustees to three companies owned by Erden Timur allegedly used to launder criminal proceeds.

On 24 March, Ndao was released after his first hearing under judicial supervision.

A day later on 25 March, Baltacı was released under judicial supervision after his initial hearing. Prior to the hearing, Galatasaray manager Okan Buruk and players Kazımcan Karataş, Doğan Alemdar and Bertuğ Yıldırım along with some Galatasaray executives came to the courthouse to show their support. Sakaryaspor players Yunus Emre Tekoğul and Abdurrahman Bayram were released on the next day, on 26 March.

=== April 2026 ===
On 3 April, Yandaş was released after his first hearing under judicial supervision. Fenerbahçe club chairman Saadettin Saran, former chairman Ali Koç and players Kerem Aktürkoğlu, Jayden Oosterwolde, Mert Günok, Çağlar Söğüncü, Cenk Tosun, Dorgeles Nene, Mert Müldür, İrfan Can Kahveci, Serdar Dursun, Anthony Musaba, Oğuz Aydın, İsmail Yüksek, and Baltacı along with some Fenerbahçe officials and players came to the courthouse to show their support.

On 13 April 2026, following Gaziantep FK's 2–1 away defeat against Rizespor, manager Burak Yılmaz announced his resignation during a post-match press conference, heavily criticizing the TFF and MHK. Yılmaz claimed he was targeted by officials after being mistakenly questioned over a betting investigation. He stated that TFF Executive Fuat Göktaş initially called him to say a "Burak Yılmaz" was involved in betting, only to call back 15 minutes later to apologize, clarifying that it was actually a different individual from Iğdır. Yılmaz admitted that following a subsequent match against Kocaeli, he called Göktaş back and used inappropriate words. He alleged that after this phone call, referees intentionally targeted both him and Gaziantep FK in every match.

=== May 2026 ===
On 7 May, Murat Özkaya was released under judicial supervision in the form of house arrest.

On 19 May, during a parliamentary speech, member of the Grand National Assembly of Turkey for Kayseri from the Nationalist Movement Party Mustafa Baki Ersoy suggested that both Kasımpaşa and Eyüpspor should be relegated, arguing that the TMSF violated regulations by managing two different clubs within the same league simultaneously.

=== June 2026 ===
On 11 June, Erden Timur was released on bail, subject to judicial supervision in the form of a travel ban and the requirement to report to the police station to sign in.

=== July 2026 ===
On 19 July, 19 people including club executives from Beşiktaş, Galatasaray and Adanaspor were accused of involvement in illegal betting. While 17 suspects were arrested, the remaining two were found to be abroad. According to the investigation, an analysis by MASAK and betting-platform data from 2020 to 2026 indicated that the suspects had placed bets on opposing teams, goals and player-specific outcomes in matches involving their own clubs.

=== August 2026 ===
On 26 August, following a 1–0 defeat away against Alanyaspor, Beşiktaş President Serdal Adalı criticized Gündoğdu over match and VAR officiating decisions. Adalı alleged that the TFF Executive Committee was incapable of removing Gündoğdu due to undisclosed external backing, called for foreign VAR officials in the upcoming Fenerbahçe–Beşiktaş derby, and announced his intentions to meet President Recep Tayyip Erdoğan to discuss the refereeing system.

=== September 2026 ===
On 29 September, MHK President Ferhat Gündoğdu and six other committee members were taken into custody following an investigation into allegations of systemic corruption and match assignment irregularities. The investigation began after former Süper Lig assistant referee Ali Tuna filed a criminal complaint, claiming that his exam paper had been forged by another individual to make it appear that he had failed. Forensic analysis confirmed that the document was forged. Tuna alleged that it had been falsified to demote him for refusing to comply with match assignment directives.

Tuna also alleged that former referees Erman Toroğlu and Ahmet Çakar had contacted Gündoğdu on different occasions and personally requested certain referees for matches, which he claimed Gündoğdu complied with. Both of them denied the allegations.

On 30 September, the TFF referred 448 Süper Lig and TFF 1. Lig club executives to the PFDK for illegal betting. The group included 10 executives from Beşiktaş including Vice President Hakan Daltaban, 3 from Fenerbahçe, 5 from Galatasaray including Işıtan Gün, 13 from Trabzonspor, among them current club president Ertuğrul Doğan and 17 from Bursaspor including president Enes Çelik. TFF Executive Committee member Ural Aküzüm also resigned after being included on the list.

On the same day, explicit content involving minors uploaded via a WhatsApp account linked to Ferdi Karadoruk, President of the TFF Active Referees and Observers Association, was identified in a forensic report prepared by the Istanbul Chief Public Prosecutor's Office.

=== October 2026 ===
As part of the MHK investigation, statements were taken from numerous referees, former referees, VAR officials, including Mete Kalkavan, Zorbay Küçük, Ümit Öztürk, Mustafa İlker Coşkun, Koray Gençerler, Süleyman Abay, Mert Güzenge, Tugay Kaan Numanoğlu, Bahattin Şimşek, Burak Pakkan, Mustafa Kamil Abitoğlu, Sarper Barış Saka, Oğuzhan Uğurlu, Abdullah Buğra Taşkınsoy, and Hüseyin Göçek.

On 1 October, an audio recording allegedly involving Gündoğdu and referee Kerem Ersoy was leaked to the press following an examination of Gündoğdu's digital materials. Gündoğdu was reportedly heard pressuring Ersoy to resign from refereeing while instructing him not to speak publicly about the committee.

On the same date, Süper Lig-tier referees Yasin Kol and Göktuğ Hazar Erel were taken into custody on charges of alleged involvement in document forgery, illegal gambling, and abuse of office.

On 2 October, correspondence between Gündoğdu and Kol concerning referee appointments was leaked to the press and included in the investigation. In WhatsApp messages included in the investigation file, Kol personally proposed the assistant referees, VAR and AVAR officials for the match he was due to officiate, while Gündoğdu either approved the proposed names or suggested alternatives. The messages were dated to the period leading up to the 2024–25 First League play-off final between Fatih Karagümrük and Bandırmaspor in May 2025. All of the officials proposed by Kol, including the VAR, AVAR and fourth official, were ultimately appointed to the match.

The leaked correspondence also included messages involving Trabzonspor President Ertuğrul Doğan concerning referee appointments. According to the investigation file, Doğan's messages with Kol and Hacıosmanoğlu included requests concerning referees for important matches. According to the investigation file, the messages included Doğan expressing preferences for certain referees, objecting to others and asking officials about previous refereeing performances.

Of the seven MHK members referred to court as part of the investigation, Sebahattin Şahin, MHK's fourth-region official, and Ahmet Şahin, former MHK deputy chairman, were released on condition of judicial supervision in the form of a travel ban. MHK Chairman Ferhat Gündoğdu, who had initially been released on bail following charges of "abuse of office" and "forgery of official documents," appeared before the court again following the inclusion of new evidence in the case file. Gündoğdu was subsequently remanded in custody pursuant to Article 135/2 of the Turkish Penal Code (TCK), which governs the unlawful recording of personal data and its aggravated forms. Furthermore, the court ruled that the proceedings against of a total of five suspects: Ferhat Gündoğdu, Ferdi Karadoruk, Yunus Yıldırım, Alican Sağlar and Emre Kosif would continue while they remain in custody.

On 4 October, MHK member Şahin resigned from the committee. The same day, Gündoğdu's attorneys announced that he had also resigned, stating that his resignation letter had been submitted to the TFF.

On 5 October, Kol was referred to the on-duty criminal judgeship of peace with a request for his arrest on charges of match-fixing and providing incentives, while Erel was referred on charges of forgery of official documents.

According to a MASAK report examining 5,978 transactions involving Kol between 2012 and 2026, 72.1 million TL was withdrawn from his accounts and 62.5 million TL was deposited, resulting in a total transaction volume of 135 million TL. The report noted a significant spike in Kol's transaction volume after 2020, with another surge between 2024 and 2026. In 2026, 22.3 million TL was deposited, while 40.8 million TL was withdrawn.

The report identified 50 bank accounts and 41 IBANs registered in Kol's name across 11 banks. The occupations listed in his bank records included sportsman, security officer, civil servant, police officer, student and other professions, while according to Social Security Institution (SGK) records, he worked as a security officer at a university from March 2018 to August 2026. Kol also received payments from the TFF for refereeing. Between 2018 and 2026, he received 25,057,733 TL from external sources, including 6,883,000 TL from the federation.

The investigation also examined transfers between Kol and referees who had officiated matches with him. Records identified 64 such individuals, who transferred 218,668 TL to Kol, while Kol transferred 853,472 TL to them. Fifty transactions occurred within three days before or two days after a shared match, 47 of which were payments from Kol to other referees. In 44 of these transactions, Kol was the main referee and the recipients were assistant referees or fourth officials. Forty transfers were made after the relevant match had started. The report stated that the purpose of the payments could not be determined from the bank records.

The file also examined transfers involving referees Onur Tomak and Okan Terzi. Tomak transferred 1.88 million TL to Kol in 12 transactions, plus another 100,000 from an account registered under the same name. Kol said Tomak was his lawyer and that the payments were compensation collected from lawsuits. Terzi received 383,180 TL from Kol in 97 transactions and transferred 120,100 TL to him in 10 transactions.

On 6 October, TFF Executive Committee member Mevlüt Aktan resigned from his position. A day later, on 7 October, TFF General Secretary, who is Hacıosmanoğlu’s nephew, Abdullah Ayaz also tendered his resignation.

== Responses ==
The revelations prompted strong reactions from major clubs, many of whom had previously voiced suspicions about match officiating:

- Fenerbahçe stated that the findings supported its previous claims about what the club described as a “toxic system” in Turkish football. The club's president, Sadettin Saran, called the findings "shocking and grave" and demanded full disclosure of the names of all implicated referees, the specific matches they officiated, and the impact on the league.
- Galatasaray President Dursun Özbek supported the TFF's decision, acknowledging the findings were evidence of a deep "crisis of trust and justice." The club stressed the severity of the blow to sports ethics.
- Beşiktaş praised the investigation as a "historic step toward clean football" and likewise urged the TFF to publicly release the names of the involved referees so the clubs could retroactively pursue their rights.
- Trabzonspor stated, "With the announcement made by the President of the Turkish Football Federation, İbrahim Hacıosmanoğlu, the extent of the structural decay that we have been voicing for a long time in the refereeing community has become clear."
- Former Turkey national team manager Şenol Güneş stated, "If betting and gambling are involved in football, there is no greater corruption than this.", supporting the need for the aggressive "clean up" being undertaken by the authorities.

== See also ==
- Turkish Football Federation
- Match fixing in association football
- NBA illegal gambling prosecution
