= Onuralp Çevikkan =

Turkish footballer (born 2006)

Personal information
- Date of birth: 2 January 2006 (age 20)
- Place of birth: Konak, Turkey
- Height: 1.92 m (6 ft 4 in)
- Position: Goalkeeper

Team information
- Current team: Trabzonspor
- Number: 25

Youth career
- 2016–2023: Altınordu

Senior career*
Years	Team	Apps	(Gls)
2023–	Trabzonspor	1	(0)

International career^{‡}
2020	Turkey U14	1	(0)
2021–2022	Turkey U16	4	(0)
2022	Turkey U17	9	(0)
2023–2024	Turkey U18	4	(0)
2024	Turkey U19	3	(0)
2026–	Turkey U21	1	(0)
- * Club domestic league appearances and goals as of 4 June 2026 ‡ National team caps and goals as of 4 June 2026

Onuralp Çevikkan (born 2 January 2006) is a Turkish professional footballer who plays as a goalkeeper for Süper Lig club Trabzonspor.

== Club career ==
A youth product of Altınordu, Çevikkan transferred to Trabzonspor on 1 July 2023 on a 3-year contract. On 3 December 2025, he made his professional debut with Trabzonspor in a 2–0 Turkish Cup win over Vanspor.

== International career ==
Çevikkan is a youth international player for Turkey, and was called up to the Turkey U19s in September 2024.

== Career statistics ==
As of match played 17 May 2026

Appearances and goals by club, season and competition
Club	Season	League			National cup		Europe		Other		Total	
Club	Season	Division	Apps	Goals	Apps	Goals	Apps	Goals	Apps	Goals	Apps	Goals
Trabzonspor	2023–24	Süper Lig	0	0	0	0	—		—		0	0
Trabzonspor	2024–25	Süper Lig	0	0	0	0	0	0	—		0	0
Trabzonspor	2025–26	Süper Lig	1	0	4	0	0	0	0	0	5	0
Trabzonspor	2026–27	Süper Lig	0	0	0	0	0	0	0	0	0	0
Career total			1	0	4	0	0	0	0	0	5	0

== Honours ==
Trabzonspor

- Turkish Cup: 2025–26
