= Erhan Çelenk =

Turkish footballer

Personal information
- Date of birth: 16 March 1989 (age 37)
- Place of birth: Akçaabat, Turkey
- Height: 1.80 m (5 ft 11 in)
- Position: Midfielder

Team information
- Current team: Serikspor
- Number: 89

Youth career
- 1999–2004: Trabzon Söğütlüspor
- 2004–2007: Akçaabat Sebatspor

Senior career*
Years	Team	Apps	(Gls)
2007–2011	Akçaabat Sebatspor	80	(6)
2011–2014	Kahramanmaraşspor	78	(11)
2014–2015	Darıca Gençlerbirliği	32	(5)
2015–2019	BB Erzurumspor	115	(34)
2019	Gazişehir Gaziantep	15	(2)
2019–2020	Akhisarspor	36	(9)
2020–2022	Altay	41	(8)
2022	Manisa	18	(4)
2022–2024	Bucaspor 1928	65	(24)
2024–	Serikspor	28	(6)
- * Club domestic league appearances and goals as of 8 November 2025

Erhan Çelenk (born 16 March 1989) is a Turkish professional footballer who plays as a midfielder for TFF 2. Lig club Serikspor.

== Professional career ==
A youth product of Trabzon Söğütlüspor and Akçaabat Sebatspor, Çelenk began his career with the latter in 2007. he had stints at Kahramanmaraşspor and Darıca Gençlerbirliği before signing with BB Erzurumspor in 2015. He made his professional debut with Erzurumspor in a 3-2 Süper Lig loss to Konyaspor on 12 August 2018. In 2019, he transferred to Gazişehir Gaziantep before further stints at Akhisarspor and Altay in the TFF First League.

On 13 November 2025, Çelenk was banned from playing for 45 days for his involvement in the 2025 Turkish football betting scandal.
