= Tim Jabol-Folcarelli =

French footballer (born 1999)

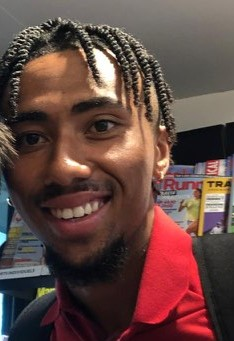
- Jabol-Folcarelli in 2023

Personal information
- Full name: Tim Luca Paco Jabol-Folcarelli
- Date of birth: 6 December 1999 (age 26)
- Place of birth: Évry-Courcouronnes, Essonne, France
- Height: 1.87 m (6 ft 2 in)
- Position: Midfielder

Team information
- Current team: Trabzonspor
- Number: 26

Youth career
- COM Bagneux
- Montrouge FC 92
- Boulogne-Billancourt
- –2019: Mulhouse

Senior career*
Years	Team	Apps	(Gls)
2018–2019	Saint-Louis Neuweg	2	(0)
2019–2020	Rennes B	18	(0)
2020–2023	Le Puy	42	(2)
2023–2025	Ajaccio	48	(3)
2025–	Trabzonspor	34	(0)
- * Club domestic league appearances and goals as of 10 June 2026

Tim Luca Paco Jabol-Folcarelli (born 6 December 1999) is a French professional footballer who plays as a midfielder for Süper Lig club Trabzonspor.

== Club career ==
Born in Évry-Courcouronnes, Essonne, Jabol-Folcarelli began his career playing for local football clubs.

On 30 May 2023, Jabol-Folcarelli joined Ligue 2 side Ajaccio. He made his professional debut on 5 August 2023 in Ajaccio's 1–1 draw against Rodez.

On 12 February 2025, he joined Trabzonspor.

== Personal life ==
Born in France, Jabol-Folcarelli is of Martiniquais descent.

== Honours ==
Trabzonspor

- Turkish Cup: 2025–26
