= Uğur Kaan Yıldız =

Turkish footballer (born 2002)

Personal information
- Date of birth: 6 August 2002 (age 24)
- Place of birth: Ümraniye, Turkey
- Height: 1.81 m (5 ft 11 in)
- Position: Right-back

Team information
- Current team: Kocaelispor
- Number: 22

Youth career
- 2012–2020: Fenerbahçe

Senior career*
Years	Team	Apps	(Gls)
2020–2022	Fenerbahçe	0	(0)
2021–2022	→ Bursaspor (loan)	8	(0)
2022–2026	Göztepe	22	(0)
2023–2024	→ Ümraniyespor (loan)	28	(4)
2024–2025	→ Keçiörengücü (loan)	32	(2)
2026–	Kocaelispor	8	(0)

International career^{‡}
2023–2024	Turkey U21	13	(0)
- * Club domestic league appearances and goals as of 18 October 2026 ‡ National team caps and goals as of 13:52, 15 April 2026 (UTC)

Uğur Kaan Yıldız (born 6 August 2002) is a Turkish professional footballer who plays as a right-back for TFF 1. Lig club Kocaelispor.

== Club career ==
Yıldız is a product of the youth academy of Fenerbahçe. On 23 November 2020, he signed a professional contract with the club until 2023. The next day on 24 November 2020, he debuted with Fenerbahçe as a substitute in a 4–0 Turkish Cup win over Sivas Belediyespor. On 20 August 2021, he joined Bursaspor on a year-long loan in the TFF 1. Lig.

On 13 July 2022, Yıldız transferred to Göztepe in the TFF 1. Lig on a 3+1 year contract. On 25 August 2023, he went on a season-long loan with Ümraniyespor. On 24 August 2024, he went on another year-long loan to Keçiörengücü. He returned to Göztepe for the 2025–26 season, debuting in the Süper Lig in a 1–0 loss to Alanyaspor. On 5 December 2025, he was detained as part of the 2025 Turkish football betting scandal. On 31 December 2025, he was released on judicial control.

== International career ==
Yıldız played for the Turkey U21s from 2023 to 2024. In June 2024 while he was in the Turkey U21s camp, Yıldız received an emergency call-up to the Turkey senior squad for the training camp prior to UEFA Euro 2024.
