= Fehmi Koç =

Turkish association football player

Personal information
- Date of birth: 28 August 2003 (age 23)
- Place of birth: Antalya, Turkey
- Position: Midfielder

Team information
- Current team: Kepezspor
- Number: 9

Youth career
- 2013: Çallı Spor
- 2013–2015: Meydan Gençlikspor
- 2015–2018: Antalyaspor

Senior career*
Years	Team	Apps	(Gls)
2018–2023	Antalyaspor	1	(0)
2022–2023	→ Kepez Belediyespor (loan)	4	(1)
2023–2024	Hacettepe 1945 SK	8	(0)
2024–2025	Türk Metal 1963 SK	6	(0)
2025–	Kepezspor	11	(2)

International career^{‡}
2017–2018	Turkey U15	9	(4)
2018–2019	Turkey U16	7	(2)
- * Club domestic league appearances and goals as of 15 January 2019 ‡ National team caps and goals as of 2 November 2025

Fehmi Koç (born 28 August 2003) is a Turkish professional footballer who plays as a midfielder for the TFF 2. Lig club Kepezspor.

== Professional career ==
Koç made his professional debut with Antalyaspor in a 0–0 Süper Lig with Fenerbahçe on 24 December 2018. Aged just 15 years, 7 months, and 3 days in his debut, Koç is the youngest ever player in the history of the Süper Lig.

He has suffered an ACL tear about a month later in January 2019 and has not recovered as of November 2019.
