= Emre Can Atila =

Turkish professional footballer

Personal information
- Date of birth: 2 September 1996 (age 30)
- Place of birth: Yenimahalle, Turkey
- Height: 1.78 m (5 ft 10 in)
- Position: Midfielder

Team information
- Current team: Serikspor
- Number: 8

Youth career
- 2006–2015: Gençlerbirliği

Senior career*
Years	Team	Apps	(Gls)
2015–2019	Konyaspor	1	(0)
2017–2018	→ Anadolu Selçukspor (loan)	14	(1)
2018	→ Shkupi (loan)	11	(2)
2018–2019	→ Anadolu Selçukspor (loan)	27	(3)
2019	Bodrumspor	4	(0)
2020	Kırklarelispor	6	(0)
2020–2021	Ankaraspor	7	(0)
2021–2023	Ergene Velimeşe	31	(2)
2023	Somaspor	17	(1)
2023–2024	Isparta 32 SK	20	(0)
2024–2025	Kepezspor	16	(0)
2025	Sebat Gençlikspor	13	(2)
2025–2026	Kepezspor	7	(0)
2026–	Serikspor	9	(0)
- * Club domestic league appearances and goals as of 14 November 2026

Emre Can Atila (born 2 September 1996) is a Turkish professional footballer who plays as a midfielder for TFF 2. Lig club Serikspor.

== Club career ==
=== Konyaspor ===
On 12 May 2017, Emre Can Atila made his debut in a 2–1 away defeat against Kayserispor after coming on as a substitute at 82nd minute in place of Marc Kibong Mbamba.

==== Loan at Konya Anadolu Selçukspor ====
On 26 August 2017, Emre Can Atila made his debut in a 3–1 home win against Pendikspor after being named in the starting line-up.

==== Loan at Shkupi ====
On 10 February 2018, Emre Can Atila joined Macedonian First Football League side Shkupi, on a season-long loan. On 4 March 2018, he made his debut in a 1–1 home draw against Rabotnički after being named in the starting line-up.

== Career statistics ==
=== Club ===
As of 17 March 2019

Club	Season	League			Cup		Continental		Other		Total	
Club	Season	Division	Apps	Goals	Apps	Goals	Apps	Goals	Apps	Goals	Apps	Goals
Konyaspor	2015–16	Süper Lig	0	0	1	1	—				1	1
Konyaspor	2016–17	Süper Lig	1	0	4	0	—				5	0
Konyaspor	Total		1	0	5	1	—				6	1
Anadolu Selçukspor (loan)	2017–18	TFF Second League	14	1	1	0	—				15	1
Shkupi (loan)	2017–18	Macedonian First League	11	2	0	0	—				11	2
Anadolu Selçukspor (loan)	2018–19	TFF Second League	25	3	1	0	—				26	3
Anadolu Selçukspor (loan)	Total		50	6	2	0	—				52	6
Career total			51	6	7	1	—				58	7
