= New Sakarya Atatürk Stadium =

Stadium in Adapazarı, Sakarya, Turkey

Sakarya Atatürk Stadium
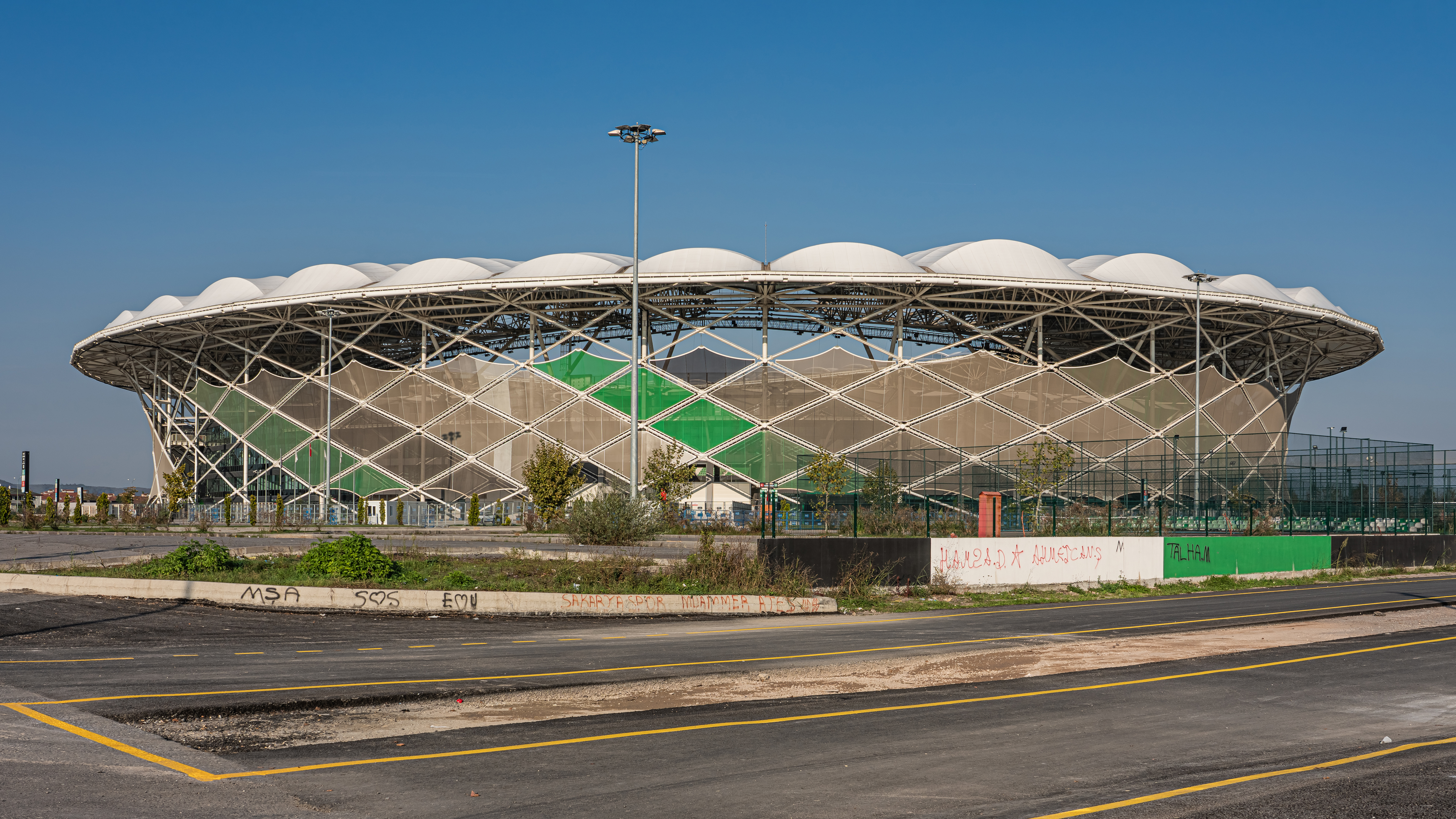
- Interactive map of Sakarya Atatürk Stadium
- Location: Adapazarı, Sakarya, Turkey
- Coordinates: 40°46′49.96″N 30°25′57.3″E
- Owner: Sakaryaspor
- Operator: Sakaryaspor
- Capacity: 28,154
- Executive suites: 19
- Record attendance: 28,000 (Sakaryaspor-Kahramanmaraşspor, 8 October 2017)
- Acreage: 95.730 m²

Construction
- Built: 2013–2017
- Opened: 8 October 2017; 8 years ago
- Cost: 150.000.000 ₺
- Architect: Alper Aksoy
- Main contractors: AHES İnşaat Ticaret ve Sanayi A.Ş; Erduman Müşavir Mühendislik ve Ticaret Ltd. Şti. TOKİ

New Sakarya Stadium, officially Sakarya Atatürk Stadyumu, is a stadium in Adapazarı, Sakarya, Turkey. It was opened to public in 2017 with a capacity of 28,154 spectators. It is the new home of Sakaryaspor of the TFF First League. It replaced the club's old home stadium, Adapazarı Atatürk Stadyumu. The estimated costs are around 150,000,000 ₺
