= Erden Timur =

Turkish lawyer and businessman

- Born: 16 November 1981 (age 44); Mersin, Turkey
- Citizenship: Turkey
- Education: Marmara University; London School of Economics
- Known for: Former director of Galatasaray
- Height: 1.65 m (5 ft 5 in)
- Spouse: Emine Timur
- Children: 2
- Parents: Musa Timur (father); Nazife Timur (mother)

Erden Timur (born 16 November 1981) is a Turkish lawyer and businessman. He is the founder of Timur Real Estate Inc. and a former director of Galatasaray.

== Early life and education ==
Erden Timur was born on 16 November 1981 in Mersin, into an Alevi family. His father, Musa Timur, was a real estate developer and his mother, Nazife Timur, was a housewife.

He completed secondary school at Toros Private Colleges and high school at Tarsus American College. He completed his undergraduate education at Marmara University's Faculty of Law and finally studied economics at the London School of Economics.

== Personal life ==
He had a daughter named Ala Bade and a son named Yusuf Kenan from his wife Emine Timur (née Sönmez).

== Betting and money laundering investigation ==
On 26 December 2025, he was detained as part of an investigation by the Istanbul Chief Public Prosecutor's Office into illegal betting and money laundering in football conducted on suspicion of violating laws numbered 6222, 5549, and 7258 due to suspicious financial transactions in his bank accounts. He was arrested on 29 December 2025. On 6 March, as part of the investigation, Timur Gayrimenkul Geliştirme Yapı ve Yatırım A.Ş., TG Timur Gayrimenkul ve Ticaret A.Ş., and Timur Şehircilik ve Planlama A.Ş., companies owned by Erden Timur and allegedly used to launder criminal proceeds, were seized and the TMSF was appointed as receiver by order of the court.
