= Mustafa Baki Ersoy =

Turkish politician (born 1981)

Mustafa Baki Ersoy (born April 3, 1981 in Kütahya) is a Turkish economist and politician. He has been a member of the Grand National Assembly of Turkey for Kayseri from the Nationalist Movement Party since 2018.

== Life ==
Mustafa Baki Ersoy was born in Yozgat in 1981. Completing his primary and secondary education in Sivas and Kütahya, Ersoy completed his high school education in Sivas. He completed his higher education at Erciyes University Department of Economics and Master education at Erciyes University Faculty of Law.

== Political career ==
He served as the provincial vice president of MHP between 2007 and 2011.

He was elected as the MHP provincial chairman on February 8, 2015, and was subsequently elected as the MHP Kayseri Deputy with the elections held in 2018. He continues his duty as the 27th Term Kayseri Deputy.

Mustafa Baki Ersoy is also a member of the "Planning and Budget Committee" in the parliamentary committee.

He was re-elected in the 2023 Turkish parliamentary election.
