= Ege Özkayımoğlu =

Turkish footballer

Personal information
- Date of birth: 18 July 2001 (age 25)
- Place of birth: Konak, Turkey
- Height: 1.85 m (6 ft 1 in)
- Position: Forward

Team information
- Current team: Boluspor
- Number: 35

Youth career
- 2010–2019: Göztepe

Senior career*
Years	Team	Apps	(Gls)
2019–2023	Göztepe	18	(0)
2020–2021	→ 1922 Konyaspor (loan)	26	(9)
2022–2023	→ Afjet Afyonspor (loan)	25	(5)
2023–2024	Uşakspor	15	(4)
2024	Belediye Derincespor	15	(2)
2024–2025	Batman Petrolspor	15	(0)
2025	→ Kepezspor (loan)	11	(1)
2025–2026	Orduspor 1967	15	(4)
2026	52 Orduspor	10	(2)
2026–	Boluspor	8	(0)

International career^{‡}
2019	Turkey U18	2	(0)
2019	Turkey U19	4	(0)
- * Club domestic league appearances and goals as of 18 October 2026 ‡ National team caps and goals as of 15 September 2019

Ege Özkayımoğlu (born 18 July 2001) is a Turkish professional footballer who plays as a forward for TFF 1. Lig club Boluspor.

== Professional career ==
Özkayımoğlu is a youth product of Göztepe, having joined their academy in 2010. Özkayımoğlu made his professional debut in a 0-0 Süper Lig tie with Çaykur Rizespor on 15 September 2019.
