= Serikspor =

Turkish football club

- Full name: Serik Spor Futbol A.Ş.
- Nickname: Pehlivanlar (The Wrestlers)
- Founded: 1955 (71 years ago)
- Stadium: İsmail Oğan Stadium
- Capacity: 2,250
- Owner: Sadıg Hasanlı
- President: Cenk Doğan
- Head coach: Yusuf Şimşek
- League: TFF 2. Lig
- 2025–26: TFF 1. Lig, 17th of 20 (relegated)
- Website: www.serikbelediyespor.com
Home colours	Away colours

Serik Spor Futbol A.Ş., commonly simply referred to as Serikspor, is a Turkish professional football club established in the Serik district of Antalya province in 1955. The club colours are green and white and they play their home matches at İsmail Oğan Stadium.

== History ==
In the 2015–16 season, he started competing in the Regional Amateur League for the first time in his history. Serik Belediyespor finished the Group 7 as champion with 62 points in the 2017–18 Regional Amateur League and qualified for play-offs. The team beat Ödemişspor 5–0 in the first round of the play-off, and promoted to the professional league for the first time in its history.

President Rakip Utan, who carried the team to the professional league, resigned after the season. Ali Aksu was elected president at the extraordinary general assembly held on 9 June 2018.

Serik Belediyespor, which is in the TFF Third League, Group 3 in 2018–19, has 13 wins, 13 draws and 8 losses in 34 matches under the management of Mehmet Şansal. He finished his group 4th by collecting 52 points and qualified for play-offs. He eliminated Karacabey Belediyespor in the play-off semi-finals after 2 matches, 1–0 and 4–2. In the final match played in Adana on 5 Ocak Fatih Terim Stadium, Serik Belediyespor faced Yeni Çorumspor, and lost the chance to be in the TFF Second League after being defeated 4–2 as a result of the penalty shootout, whose normal time and extensions ended 1–1. In the general assembly held before the 2019–20 season, Ramazan Kaçar was elected as the new president. Serik Belediyespor, which started the 2019–20 season in the TFF Third League, Group 1, completed the season in the first place and reached the TFF Second League. The club made a name for itself by pairing up with Süper Lig teams Adana Demirspor, Ankaragücü and Beşiktaş in the Turkish Cup matches.

== League appearances ==
- TFF First League: 2025–2026
- TFF Second League: 2020–2025, 2026-
- TFF Third League: 2018–2020
- Regional Amateur League: 2015–2018
- Amateur Level: 1955–2015

== Players ==
=== Current squad ===
As of 16 November 2026

Note: Flags indicate national team as defined under FIFA eligibility rules; some limited exceptions apply. Players may hold more than one non-FIFA nationality.

No.	Pos.	Nation	Player
1	GK	GER	Baha Karakaya
4	DF	TUR	Fatih Yıldırım
5	MF	TUR	Alihan Erdoğan
7	FW	TUR	Sadik Baş
8	MF	TUR	Emre Can Atila
10	FW	TUR	Erhan Çelenk
14	MF	TUR	Maksut Taşkıran
15	DF	TUR	Oğuz Yılmaz
16	MF	TUR	Orkhan Tufan
17	FW	TUR	Caner Aktaş
18	DF	TUR	Sadık Çiftpınar
19	FW	TUR	Tunahan Basak
20	FW	TUR	Şahin Fıstıkcı

No.	Pos.	Nation	Player
26	MF	TUR	Sertan Yıldız
27	FW	TUR	Kadir Arı
30	GK	TUR	Yusuf İslam Atay
34	MF	TUR	Harun Alpsoy
43	DF	TUR	Abdullah Balıkuv
66	MF	TUR	Alperen Köşker
67	DF	TUR	Kamil Efe Üregen (on loan from Fenerbahçe)
71	GK	TUR	Metin Uçar
77	DF	TUR	Siraç Susancak
83	MF	TUR	Enes Öğrüce (on loan from Bodrum)
84	MF	TUR	Ahmet Aşkın Pul
99	FW	TUR	Ahmet Daniel Akyıldız

=== Other players under contract ===
Note: Flags indicate national team as defined under FIFA eligibility rules; some limited exceptions apply. Players may hold more than one non-FIFA nationality.

No. / Pos. / Nation / Player; — / DF / TUR / Mehmet Demirözü	No. / Pos. / Nation / Player; — / FW / RUS / Ilya Sadygov
