= 2024–25 İstanbulspor season =

İstanbulspor
2024–25 season
- Stadium: Esenyurt Necmi Kadıoğlu Stadium
- TFF First League: Pre-season
- Turkish Cup: Pre-season

The 2024–25 season is the 99th season in the history of İstanbulspor, and the club's first season in TFF First League. In addition to the domestic league, the team is scheduled to participate in the Turkish Cup.

== Friendlies ==
=== Pre-season ===
| Friendly | v |

== Competitions ==
=== Overall record ===
| Competition | First match | Last match | Starting round | Record | | | | | | | |
| Competition | First match | Last match | Starting round | Pld | W | D | L | GF | GA | GD | Win % |
|---|---|---|---|---|---|---|---|---|---|---|---|
| TFF First League | 9–12 August 2024 | 10 May 2024 | Matchday 1 | 0 | 0 | 0 | 0 | 0 | 0 | +0 | — |
| Turkish Cup | | | | 0 | 0 | 0 | 0 | 0 | 0 | +0 | — |
| Total | | | | 0 | 0 | 0 | 0 | 0 | 0 | +0 | — |

Source: Competitions

=== TFF First League ===
==== League table ====
| Pos | Team | Pld | W | D | L | GF | GA | GD | Pts | Promotion, qualification or relegation |
|---|---|---|---|---|---|---|---|---|---|---|
| 2 | Gençlerbirliği (P) | 38 | 19 | 11 | 8 | 57 | 34 | +23 | 68 | Promotion to the Süper Lig |
| 3 | Fatih Karagümrük (O, P) | 38 | 19 | 9 | 10 | 55 | 36 | +19 | 66 | Qualification for the Süper Lig play-off final |
| 4 | İstanbulspor | 38 | 20 | 4 | 14 | 67 | 38 | +29 | 64 (Note: Head-to-head points: İstanbulspor 7, Bandırmaspor 7, Erzurumspor 3. Head-to-head goal difference: İstanbulspor +1, Bandırmaspor 0.) | Qualification for the Süper Lig play-off quarter-finals |
| 5 | Bandırmaspor | 38 | 17 | 13 | 8 | 52 | 45 | +7 | 64 | Qualification for the Süper Lig play-off quarter-finals |
| 6 | Erzurumspor | 38 | 19 | 7 | 12 | 53 | 31 | +22 | 64 | Qualification for the Süper Lig play-off quarter-finals |

Source: TFF
Rules for classification: 1) Points; 2) Head-to-head points; 3) Head-to-head goal difference; 4) Head-to-head goals scored; 5) Goal difference; 6) Goals scored; 7) Play-off.
(Note: Head-to-head record is used only after all the matches between the teams in question have been played)
(O) Play-off winners; (P) Promoted

==== Results summary ====
| Overall | | | | | | | | Home | | | | | | Away | | | | | |
| Pld | W | D | L | GF | GA | GD | Pts | W | D | L | GF | GA | GD | W | D | L | GF | GA | GD |
|---|---|---|---|---|---|---|---|---|---|---|---|---|---|---|---|---|---|---|---|
| 0 | 0 | 0 | 0 | 0 | 0 | 0 | 0 | 0 | 0 | 0 | 0 | 0 | 0 | 0 | 0 | 0 | 0 | 0 | 0 |

==== Results by round ====
| Round | 1 |
|---|---|
| Ground | |
| Result | |
| Position | |

A = Away; H = Home; W = Win; D = Draw; L = Loss

==== Matches ====
The match schedule was released on 24 July 2024.

| 10 August 2024 1 | İstanbulspor | 3–2 | Manisa | Istanbul |
| 19:15 EEST | Gültekin 15'; Yaşar (yellow card) 29'; Sarıkaya 44' 52' | Report | Mamadou Cissokho (yellow card) 22'; Kadir Kaan Yurdakul 25'; Efe Taylan Altunkara (yellow card) 33'; Gürbulak 83' (pen.); Osuji (yellow card) 90+1' | Stadium: Esenyurt Necmi Kadıoğlu Stadium; Attendance: 91; Referee: (Turkey) Ömer Tolga Güldibi |

| 19 August 2024 2 | Amed | 0–1 | İstanbulspor | Diyarbakır |
| 21:00 EEST | Traoré (yellow card) 8'; Uğur Gezer (yellow card) 10' (yellow-red card) 56' | Report | Jackson (yellow card) 67'; Gültekin 77' (yellow card) 77' | Stadium: Diyarbakır Stadium; Attendance: 22,145; Referee: (Turkey) Fatih Tokail |

| 26 August 2024 3 | İstanbulspor | 3–0 | Şanlıurfaspor | Istanbul |
| 21:00 EEST | Erdoğan 14'; Coly (yellow card) 20'; Gültekin 23'; Sarıkaya (yellow card) 29'; Gaoussou Diarra 90+6' | Report | Mehmet Coşkun (yellow card) 45+3'; Reinkort (yellow card) 81' | Stadium: Esenyurt Necmi Kadıoğlu Stadium; Attendance: 482; Referee: (Turkey) Davut Çelik |

| 1 September 2024 4 | Ankaragücü | 2–1 | İstanbulspor | Ankara |
| 19:15 EEST | Dadashov 39' (yellow card) 69'; Güneren (yellow card) 66'; Bekiroğlu 89' | Report | Sarıkaya 68' (pen.); Duhaney (yellow card) 76' | Stadium: Eryaman Stadium; Attendance: 5,738; Referee: (Turkey) Arda Kardeşler |

| 14 September 2024 5 | İstanbulspor | 3–0 | Ümraniyespor | Istanbul |
| 19:00 EEST | Gültekin 4' (yellow card) 55'; Gaoussou Diarra (yellow card) 44' (goal) 84'; Şen (yellow card) 50'; Erdoğan 69' | Report | | Stadium: Esenyurt Necmi Kadıoğlu Stadium; Attendance: 212; Referee: (Turkey) Alper Akarsu |

| 22 September 2024 6 | İstanbulspor | 0–0 | Bandırmaspor | Istanbul |
| 19:00 EEST | | Report | Diniyev (yellow card) 81' | Stadium: Esenyurt Necmi Kadıoğlu Stadium; Attendance: 315; Referee: (Turkey) Sarper Saka |

| 30 September 2024 7 | Fatih Karagümrük | 1–0 | İstanbulspor | Istanbul |
| 20:00 EEST | Wesley 30' (pen.); Çankaya (yellow card) 42'; Johnson (yellow card) 70'; Paoletti (yellow card) 90' | Report | Sarıkaya (yellow card) 31' | Stadium: Atatürk Olympic Stadium; Attendance: 193; Referee: (Turkey) Mustafa Filiz |

| 6 October 2024 8 | İstanbulspor | 0–3 | Kocaelispor | Istanbul |
| 19:00 EET | Vorobjovas (yellow card) 30'; Yaşar (yellow card) 67' | Report | Ryan Mendes 8' 36'; Çelik 63' | Stadium: Esenyurt Necmi Kadıoğlu Stadium; Attendance: 604; Referee: (Turkey) Erdem Mertoğlu |

| 20 October 2024 9 | Sakaryaspor | 3–1 | İstanbulspor | Sakarya |
| 19:00 EET | Akpınar 37'; Fernando Andrade 61'; Karayel (yellow card) 63'; Simon (yellow card) 66'; Uzun (yellow card) 88'; Çipe (yellow card) 89'; Demir 90+3' | Report | Loshaj (yellow card) 31'; Ethemi 42' (yellow card) 72'; Gaoussou Diarra (yellow card) 73'; Coly (yellow card) 90+4' | Stadium: Sakarya Atatürk Stadium; Attendance: 4,588; Referee: (Turkey) Emre Kargın |

| 27 October 2024 10 | İstanbulspor | 1–2 | Boluspor | Istanbul |
| 18:00 EET | Sarıkaya 29'; Dijlan Aydın (yellow card) 45+1'; Ethemi (yellow card) 79' | Report | Avramovski 14' 16'; Akbaba (yellow card) 64' | Stadium: Esenyurt Necmi Kadıoğlu Stadium; Attendance: 519; Referee: (Turkey) Furkan Aksuoğlu |

| 4 November 2024 11 | Gençlerbirliği | 2–1 | İstanbulspor | Ankara |
| 19:00 EET | Žužek (yellow card) 25'; Osmanoğlu (yellow card) 37' (goal) 57'; Babacan (yellow card) 41'; Amilton (yellow card) 76'; Mimaroğlu 90+3' (pen.) | Report | Gültekin 26'; Gaoussou Diarra (yellow card) 41'; Şen (yellow card) 75'; Dijlan Aydın (yellow card) 90+2'; Coly (red card) 90+10' | Stadium: Eryaman Stadium; Attendance: 1,334; Referee: (Turkey) Ömer Turtay |

| 9 November 2024 12 | İstanbulspor | 0–0 | Adanaspor | Istanbul |
| 12:30 EET | Sönmez (yellow card) 61' | Report | Samuel Yépié Yépié (yellow card) 29'; Alpsoy (yellow card) 44'; Yıldırım (yellow card) 51'; Fofana (yellow card) 79' | Stadium: Esenyurt Necmi Kadıoğlu Stadium; Attendance: 154; Referee: (Turkey) Yasin Kol |

| 23 November 2024 13 | Yeni Malatyaspor | 1–4 | İstanbulspor | Malatya |
| 12:30 EET | Ferhat Canli (yellow card) 69' (red card) 81'; Nuri Aydin 90' | Report | Erdoğan 11' 49'; Sarıkaya (yellow card) 18'; Gaoussou Diarra 40'; Tultak (yellow card) 45+2'; Yusuf Özer 75' | Stadium: New Malatya Stadium; Attendance: 455; Referee: (Turkey) Erkan Özdamar |

| 30 November 2024 14 | İstanbulspor | 4–0 | Iğdır | Istanbul |
| 15:00 EET | Tultak 4'; Erdoğan (yellow card) 22'; Gültekin 33' 87'; Sönmez (yellow card) 36'; Gaoussou Diarra (yellow card) 37'; Ethemi 72' | Report | Thuram (yellow card) 16'; Burak Çoban (yellow card) 18' | Stadium: Esenyurt Necmi Kadıoğlu Stadium; Attendance: 633; Referee: (Turkey) Zorbay Küçük |

| 8 December 2024 15 | Ankara Keçiörengücü | 2–1 | İstanbulspor | Ankara |
| 12:30 EET | Erkam Develi 21'; Tultak 35' (o.g.); Diouf (yellow card) 48' | Report | Özcan Şahan (yellow card) 43'; Tultak 61'; Loshaj (yellow card) 63'; İsa Doğan (yellow card) 73'; Ologo (yellow card) 90+1' | Stadium: Ankara Aktepe Stadium; Attendance: 719; Referee: (Turkey) Ömer Tolga Güldibi |

| 14 December 2024 16 | İstanbulspor | 3–2 | Erzurumspor | Istanbul |
| 12:30 EET | Vorobjovas 27'; Sönmez 72'; Gaoussou Diarra 90+3' | Report | Mamba 23'; Gökhan Akkan (yellow card) 65'; Roshi 77' | Stadium: Esenyurt Necmi Kadıoğlu Stadium; Attendance: 585; Referee: (Turkey) Adnan Kayatepe |

| 21 December 2024 17 | Pendikspor | 1–1 | İstanbulspor | Istanbul |
| 18:00 EET | Keskin (yellow card) 37'; Kaya (yellow card) 41'; Bekir Karadeniz (yellow card) 60'; Eze 85' | Report | Gaoussou Diarra 9'; Tultak (yellow card) 85' | Stadium: Pendik Stadium; Attendance: 501; Referee: (Turkey) Batuhan Kolak |

| 5 January 2025 18 | İstanbulspor | 4–0 | Esenler Erokspor | Istanbul |
| 15:00 EET | Coly 23'; Gaoussou Diarra 48'; Yaşar 90+1'; Dijlan Aydın 90+6' | Report | Jack (yellow card) 56' | Stadium: Esenyurt Necmi Kadıoğlu Stadium; Attendance: 107; Referee: (Turkey) Mustafa Filiz |

| 13 January 2025 19 | Çorum | 3–1 | İstanbulspor | Çorum |
| 16:00 EET | Tunahan Ergül (yellow card) 3'; Yazgan 45+1' (yellow card) 78'; Touré (yellow card) 51'; Kaya 58'; Karadağ 89' | Report | Sarıkaya 53' (pen.) | Stadium: Çorum City Stadium; Attendance: 1,459; Referee: (Turkey) Yasin Kol |

| 19 January 2025 20 | Manisa | 0–1 | İstanbulspor | Manisa |
| 18:00 EET | Gürbulak (yellow card) 22'; Bartu Göçmen (yellow card) 30'; Kadir Kaan Yurdakul (yellow card) 79' | Report | Coly (yellow card) 34'; Tultak (yellow card) 45+1'; Gaoussou Diarra 62' | Stadium: Manisa 19 Mayıs Stadium; Attendance: 446; Referee: (Turkey) Erdem Mertoğlu |

| 25 January 2025 21 | İstanbulspor | 1–0 | Amed | Istanbul |
| 15:00 EET | Şen 48' | Report | Veli Çetin (yellow card) 87' | Stadium: Esenyurt Necmi Kadıoğlu Stadium; Attendance: 1,192; Referee: (Turkey) Mehmet Özer |

| 2 February 2025 22 | Şanlıurfaspor | 1–0 | İstanbulspor | Şanlıurfa |
| 12:30 EET | Amar Begić 90+2' | Report | | Stadium: Şanlıurfa 11 Nisan Stadium; Attendance: 3,927; Referee: (Turkey) Furkan Aksuoğlu |

| 9 February 2025 23 | İstanbulspor | 1–0 | Ankaragücü | Istanbul |
| 15:00 EET | Gaoussou Diarra (yellow card) 31'; Gültekin 68'; Bahadır (yellow card) 90+2' | Report | | Stadium: Esenyurt Necmi Kadıoğlu Stadium; Attendance: 451; Referee: (Turkey) Raşit Yorgancılar |

| 13 February 2025 24 | Ümraniyespor | 2–1 | İstanbulspor | Istanbul |
| 19:00 EET | Yıldırım 27'; Bardhi (yellow card) 59'; Soukou 79' (red card) 90+5'; Ekincier (yellow card) 90+7' | Report | Vorobjovas (yellow card) 21'; Sönmez 45+1' | Stadium: Ümraniye Municipality City Stadium; Attendance: 159; Referee: (Turkey) İlker Avcı |

| 17 February 2025 25 | Bandırmaspor | 1–0 | İstanbulspor | Bandırma |
| 13:00 EET | Mehmet Özcan (yellow card) 8'; Marco Paixão 26' (pen.); Nukan (yellow card) 80'; Diony (yellow card) 83'; Alkan (yellow card) 90+7' | Report | Yiğit Fidan (yellow card) 22'; Bahadır (yellow card) 61'; Aksu (red card) 69' | Stadium: Bandırma 17 Eylül Stadium; Attendance: 1,185; Referee: (Turkey) Gürcan Hasova |

| 22 February 2025 26 | İstanbulspor | 2–0 | Fatih Karagümrük | Istanbul |
| 18:00 EET | Bahadır 49'; Erdoğan (yellow card) 80'; Loshaj 83' | Report | | Stadium: Esenyurt Necmi Kadıoğlu Stadium; Attendance: 413; Referee: (Turkey) Mehmet Türkmen |

| 3 March 2025 27 | Kocaelispor | 1–1 | İstanbulspor | İzmit |
| 19:30 EET | Çağlayan 44' (pen.); Pedrinho (yellow card) 79'; Oğuz (yellow card) 90+1'; Değirmenci (yellow card) 90+7' | Report | Dijlan Aydın (yellow card) 31'; Coly (yellow card) 38'; Alp Tutar (yellow card) 42'; Özcan 90+1'; Gültekin (yellow card) 90+3'; Loshaj (yellow card) 90+10' | Stadium: Kocaeli Stadium; Attendance: 7,962; Referee: (Turkey) Davut Çelik |

| 6 March 2025 28 | İstanbulspor | 3–0 | Sakaryaspor | Istanbul |
| 15:00 EET | Erdoğan (yellow card) 10'; Bahadır (yellow card) 19'; Gaoussou Diarra 23'; Gültekin 28'; Dijlan Aydın (yellow card) 42'; Krstovski 60' | Report | | Stadium: Esenyurt Necmi Kadıoğlu Stadium; Attendance: 366; Referee: (Turkey) Oğuzhan Aksu |

| 10 March 2025 29 | Boluspor | 1–0 | İstanbulspor | Istanbul |
| 15:00 EET | Mukairu 30'; Mário Balbúrdia (yellow card) 45' | Report | Loshaj (yellow card) 70'; Coly (yellow card) 90+6' | Stadium: Ümraniye Municipality City Stadium; Attendance: 91; Referee: (Turkey) Yusuf Gündüz |

| 16 March 2025 30 | İstanbulspor | 5–0 | Gençlerbirliği | Istanbul |
| 12:30 EET | Gültekin 15'; Gaoussou Diarra 27' 57' 77'; İsa Doğan (yellow card) 45+4'; Loshaj 71' | Report | Çağıran (yellow card) 44'; Üzüm (yellow card) 45+4' | Stadium: Esenyurt Necmi Kadıoğlu Stadium; Attendance: 316; Referee: (Turkey) Direnç Tonusluoğlu |

| 10 May 2025 34 | v |

=== Turkish Cup ===
| 31 October 2024 Third Round | İstanbulspor | 4-2 | Kilis Belediyespor | Istanbul |
| 16:30 EET | Sambissa 28'; Demi̇r Mermerci̇ 45+1' (yellow card) 55'; Gaoussou Diarra 59'; Dijlan Aydın 90+3' | Report | Emrah Mutlu (yellow card) 44'; Mustafa Bardak (yellow card) 51'; Arif Bostancı 57' (pen.); Taner Çapakçur 72'; Onur Kızıltaş (yellow card) 78'; Cabbar Samancı (yellow card) 78' | Stadium: Esenyurt Necmi Kadıoğlu Stadium; Referee: (Turkey) Gürcan Hasova |

| 4 December 2024 Fourth Round | İstanbulspor | 4-1 | Alanya 1221 | Istanbul |
| 12:30 EET | Coly (yellow card) 24'; Şen 41'; Ologo 50'; Eren Arda Şan (yellow card) 53'; Ümit Kurt 84'; Sambissa 89' | Report | Yusuf Saydam 90+2' | Stadium: Esenyurt Necmi Kadıoğlu Stadium; Referee: (Turkey) Alpaslan Şen |

| 18 December 2024 Fifth Round | Esenler Erokspor | 1-2 | İstanbulspor | Istanbul |
| 12:00 EET | Ertuğrul İdris Furat 21'; Berkay Aydoğmuş (yellow card) 24' | Report | Yusuf Özer 29' 76'; Vorobjovas (yellow card) 50' | Stadium: Esenler Stadium; Referee: (Turkey) Ömer Gültekin |

== Group stage ==
| Pos | Team | Pld | W | D | L | GF | GA | GD | Pts | FEN | GÖZ | İST | GAZ | ERZ | KAS |
|---|---|---|---|---|---|---|---|---|---|---|---|---|---|---|---|
| 1 | Fenerbahçe | 3 | 3 | 0 | 0 | 12 | 1 | +11 | 9 | | | | | 5–0 | |
| 2 | Göztepe | 3 | 3 | 0 | 0 | 7 | 0 | +7 | 9 | | | | 1–0 | | |
| 3 | İstanbulspor | 3 | 2 | 0 | 1 | 5 | 4 | +1 | 6 | | | | | | 2–0 |
| 4 | Gaziantep | 3 | 1 | 0 | 2 | 5 | 5 | 0 | 3 | 1–4 | | 4–0 | | | |
| 5 | Erzurumspor | 3 | 0 | 0 | 3 | 0 | 9 | −9 | 0 | | 0–1 | 0–3 | | | |
| 6 | Kasımpaşa | 3 | 0 | 0 | 3 | 0 | 10 | −10 | 0 | 0–3 | 0–5 | | | | |

| 9 January 2025 Group B | Gaziantep | 4-0 | İstanbulspor | Gaziantep |
| 17:00 EET | Kodro 24' 88' 90+2'; Erdoğan 86'; Bruno Viana (yellow card) 86' | Report | Jackson (yellow card) 42'; Erdoğan (yellow card) 61'; Vorobjovas (yellow card) 80' | Stadium: Gaziantep Stadium; Referee: (Turkey) Adnan Kayatepe |

| 6 February 2025 Group B | İstanbulspor | 2-0 | Kasımpaşa | Istanbul |
| 12:00 EET | Krstovski 7' 32'; Özcan (yellow card) 18'; Loshaj (yellow card) 40' | Report | Serhat Akçay (yellow card) 61' | Stadium: Esenyurt Necmi Kadıoğlu Stadium; Referee: (Turkey) Reşat Coşkunses |

| 27 February 2025 Group B | Erzurumspor | 0-3 | İstanbulspor | Istanbul |
| 15:00 EET | | Report | Gültekin 65'; Yusuf Özer 69' 88' | Stadium: Esenyurt Necmi Kadıoğlu Stadium; Referee: (Turkey) Burak Olcar |
