= 2024–25 Turkish Cup =

Ziraat Turkish Cup

Tournament details
- Country: Turkey
- Dates: 10 September 2024 – 14 May 2025
- Teams: 155

Final positions
- Champions: Galatasaray (19th title)
- Runners-up: Trabzonspor

The 2024–25 Turkish Cup (Turkish: Türkiye Kupası) was the 63rd edition of the tournament. Ziraat Bank was the main sponsor of the tournament, thus the sponsored name was Ziraat Turkish Cup. The winners of the cup qualified for the 2025–26 UEFA Europa League play-off round and the 2025 Turkish Super Cup.

Beşiktaş were the defending champions, after winning the cup in the previous edition, but they were eliminated in the quarter-finals by Göztepe.

== Competition format ==
The competition format was changed from previous seasons, and teams now played in this new format starting from this season. After five qualifying rounds, 24 teams played in the group stage (which returned for the first time since the 2016–17 season). The group stage consisted of four groups of six teams each, where the top two finishers of each group progressed to the quarter-finals.

Round	Draw date	Match dates	Total clubs remaining	Clubs involved	Winners from previous round	New entries at this round	Leagues entering at this round	Notes
First round	3 September 2024	10–12 September 2024	155	32	0	32	16 amateur teams from provinces that did not have a professional team in the 2024–25 season; 16 teams in 2024–25 3rd League groups except those entering in second and third rounds	single leg
Second round	17 September 2024	8–10 October 2024	139	64	16	48	12 teams promoted from 2023–24 Amateur League; 16 teams ranked 7th–10th in 2023–24 3rd League groups; 2 teams ranked 11th with the best point average in 2023–24 3rd League groups; 18 teams from 2nd League except those entering in third and fourth rounds	single leg
Third round	15 October 2024	29–31 October 2024	107	70	32	38	18 teams eliminated from 2023–24 3rd League play-offs; 2 teams ranked 7th in 2023–24 2nd League groups; 1 team ranked 8th with the best point average in 2023–24 2nd League groups; 6 teams promoted from 2023–24 3rd League; 7 teams in 2024–25 1st League except those entering in fourth and fifth rounds; 4 teams in 2024–25 Süper Lig except those entering in fourth, fifth rounds and group stage	single leg; seedings applied
Fourth round	5 November 2024	3–5 December 2024	72	58	35	23	9 teams eliminated from 2023–24 2nd League play-offs; 6 teams ranked 8th to 13th in 2023–24 1st League; 3 teams promoted from 2023–24 2nd League; 5 teams ranked 8th to 12th in 2023–24 Süper Lig	single leg; seedings applied
Fifth round	6 December 2024	17–19 December 2024	43	38	29	9	4 teams eliminated from 2023–24 1st League play-offs; 2 teams ranked 5th and 7th (as 6th-place Beşiktaş won the 2023–24 Turkish Cup) in 2023–24 Süper Lig; 3 teams promoted from 2023–24 1st League	single leg; seedings applied
Group stage	20 December 2024	7–9 January 2025 (Matchday 1); 4–6 February 2025 (Matchday 2); 25–27 February (Matchday 3)	24	24	19	5	Winners of 2023–24 Turkish Cup; 4 teams participating in European competitions	4 groups of 6 teams; seedings applied
Quarter-finals	6 February 2025	1–3 April 2025	8	8	8	0		single leg; seedings applied; teams that finished first in groups played at home
Semi-finals	6 February 2025	22–24 April 2025	4	4	4	0		single leg
Final	6 February 2025	14 May 2025	2	2	2	0		single leg; on a neutral field

== First round ==
16 Third League and 16 Regional Amateur League teams competed in this round. No seeds were applied in the single-leg round. The draw was held on 3 September 2024. The match schedules were announced on 4 September 2024. 11 seeded and 5 unseeded teams qualified for the next round. 11 Third League and 5 Regional Amateur League teams qualified to the next round. The biggest upset was Bucak Belediye Oğuzhanspor (153) eliminating Denizlispor (80). The lowest-ranked team qualified for the next round was Bucak Belediye Oğuzhanspor (153). The highest-ranked team eliminated was Kırşehir (79).

Number of teams per tier still in competition
Super League (Note: Super League and First League teams began entering the competition in the third round.)	First League	Second League (Note: Second League teams began entering the competition in the second round.)	Third League	Amateur League	Total
19 / 19	20 / 20	36 / 36	64 / 64	16 / 16	155 / 155

=== Matches ===
10 September 2024	Kahramanmaraş İstiklalspor (4)	0–1	Kilis Belediyespor (5)	Kahramanmaraş
14:00		Report	Bostancı 26'	Stadium: Batıpark Adem Şahan; Referee: Hakan Aktaş

10 September 2024	Sinopspor (5)	0–2	Düzcespor (4)	Sinop
15:00		Report	Gök 17'; Uslu 89' (pen.)	Stadium: Sinop Üniversite; Referee: Aslan Gökhan Çelik

11 September 2024	Çankırı (5)	1–2	Kırıkkale (4)	Çankırı
13:30	Özçakır 47'	Report	Arslantaş 7', 90+4'	Stadium: Çankırı Atatürk; Referee: Buğrahan Dilkan İnanır

11 September 2024	Bayburt Özel İdarespor (4)	2–0	Serhat Ardahanspor (5)	Bayburt
14:00	Delimehmet 46'; Atmaca 90+2'	Report		Stadium: Bayburt Genç Osman; Referee: Göktan Demeli

11 September 2024	Bitlis Özgüzelderespor (5)	2–0	Hakkari Zapspor (5)	Bitlis
14:00	Erel 55'; Yarar 63'	Report		Stadium: Bitlis 8 Eylül; Referee: Emrullah Baydar

11 September 2024	Dersimspor (5)	0–7	Adıyaman (4)	Tunceli
14:00		Report	Yeşilkaya 20'; Yıldız 23' (o.g.); Çalışkan 34'; Kuru 45+4'; Ergün 47' (pen.); Ersin 85'; Uzunel 89'	Stadium: Tunceli Atatürk; Referee: Deniz Sercan Akgül

11 September 2024	Kahramanmaraşspor (4)	1–0	Nevşehir Belediyespor (4)	Kahramanmaraş
14:00	Göktas 59' (o.g.)	Report		Stadium: Batıpark Adem Şahan; Referee: Armağan Çıbık

11 September 2024	Kelkit Hürriyetspor (4)	3–1 (a.e.t.)	Kars 36 Spor (5)	Gümüşhane
14:00	Dege 79', 120'; Bahçıvan 102' (pen.)	Report	Eylenen 90+2'	Stadium: Kelkit İlçe; Referee: Ahmet Turan Timuroğlu

11 September 2024	Şırnak Petrolspor (5)	4–1	Kurtalanspor (5)	Şırnak
14:00	Temir 20'; Özer 45+2'; Kaya 52'; Yıldırım 89'	Report	Ömeroğlu 32'	Stadium: Şırnak Şehir; Referee: Muhammet Furkan Dursunoğlu

11 September 2024	Bucak Belediye Oğuzhanspor (5)	0–0 (a.e.t.) (6–5 p)	Denizlispor (4)	Burdur
14:30		Report		Stadium: Bucak İlçe; Referee: İbrahim Güner
	Penalties
	İncesu (penalty scored); Odabaşı (penalty scored); Çolak (penalty scored); Süren (penalty scored); Yurdakul (penalty scored); Cihan (penalty scored)		(penalty scored) Naza; (penalty scored) Uğurlu; (penalty scored) Yalçın; (penalty scored) Yılmaz; (penalty scored) Yumlu

11 September 2024	Etimesgut Belediyespor (4)	1–0	Kırşehir (4)	Ankara
14:30	Selimoğlu 6'	Report		Stadium: Etimesgut Belediyesi Atatürk; Referee: Serkan Eryilmaz

11 September 2024	Yeşil Yalova (5)	3–0	Yeni Çanspor (5)	Yalova
14:30	Aydın 19'; Kıral 73'; Arslan 89'	Report		Stadium: Yalova Atatürk; Referee: Emre Hikmet Arcan

11 September 2024	Zonguldakspor (4)	2–0	Bartınspor (5)	Zonguldak
14:30	Alaeddinoğlu 33'; Öztürk 78'	Report		Stadium: Karaelmas Kemal Köksal; Referee: İbrahim Güner

11 September 2024	Uşakspor (4)	4–0	1922 Konyaspor (4)	Uşak
16:00	Gundak 9'; Torun 14' (pen.); Akyıldız 37'; Uz 90+5'	Report		Stadium: Uşak 1 Eylül; Referee: Muhammet Alperen Çopur

12 September 2024	23 Elazığ (4)	2–0	12 Bingölspor (5)	Elazığ
13:30	Gürbüz 43'; Peker 57'	Report		Stadium: Doğukent; Referee: Onur Can Dolğun

12 September 2024	Bozüyük Vitraspor (5)	0–1	Bursaspor (4)	Bilecik
16:00		Report	Akçay 17'	Stadium: Gölpazarı İlçe; Referee: Emre Küçük

== Second round ==
18 Second League, 41 Third League and 5 Regional Amateur League teams competed in this round. No seeds were applied in the single-leg round. The draw was held on 17 September 2024. The match schedules were announced on 19 September 2024. 16 seeded and 16 unseeded teams qualified for the next round. 9 Second League, 21 Third League, 2 Regional Amateur League teams qualified to the next round. The biggest upset was Tire 2021 (135) eliminating Beykoz Anadoluspor (40). The lowest-ranked team qualified for the next round was Yeşil Yalova (143). The highest-ranked team eliminated was Beykoz Anadoluspor (40).

Number of teams per tier still in competition
Super League (Note: Super League and First League teams began entering the competition in the third round.)	First League	Second League	Third League	Amateur League	Total
19 / 19	20 / 20	36 / 36	59 / 64	5 / 16	139 / 155

=== Matches ===
8 October 2024	Kilis Belediyespor (5)	2–0	Balıkesirspor (4)	Kilis
13:00	Yalçın 76'; Öz 90+2'			Stadium: Kilis 7 Aralık

8 October 2024	Zonguldakspor (4)	2–4 (a.e.t.)	Kırıkkale (4)	Zonguldak
15:00	Baydemir 68'; Pülgir 90+3'		Göçmen 22'; Tunç 35'; Vural 114' (pen.); Başkaya 118'	Stadium: Karaelmas Kemal Köksal

8 October 2024	Fethiyespor (3)	2–2 (a.e.t.) (4–3 p)	Düzcespor (4)	Mugla
19:00	Çakır 36', 70' (pen.)		Özkabak 66'; Ekici 81'	Stadium: Fethiye İlçe
	Penalties
	Dereli (penalty scored); Özdemir (penalty scored); Erdem (penalty scored); Akın (penalty scored)		(penalty scored) Ayhanoğlu; (penalty scored) Kartal; (penalty scored) Köroğlu

9 October 2024	Adıyaman (4)	5–0	Afyonspor (3)	Adiyaman
13:00	Uzunel 13'; Kuru 57'; Sarı 69'; Aksakal 71'; Aral 75' (pen.)			Stadium: Kahta İlçe

9 October 2024	Artvin Hopaspor (4)	1–3	Belediye Derincespor (3)	Artvin
13:00	Gündoğdu 90+4'		Balcı 16'; Nalbant 85'; Yaman 90'	Stadium: Arhavi İlçe

9 October 2024	23 Elazığ (4)	3–2 (a.e.t.)	Polatlı 1926 (4)	Elazig
13:00	S. Kurt 84'; Sağır 90+1'; M. Kurt 97'		Alan 16' (pen.), 61'	Stadium: Doğukent

9 October 2024	Ağrı 1970 (4)	4–0	Arnavutköy Belediyespor (3)	Agri
13:30	Öztürk 20'; Biçer 36'; Eskiköy 58'; Yıldırım 61'			Stadium: Vali Lütfü Yeğenoğlu

9 October 2024	Amasyaspor (4)	4–0	Bucak Belediye Oğuzhanspor (5)	Amasya
14:00	Yılmaz 6'; Erboğa 45+1', 77'; Aslan 45+3'			Stadium: 12 Haziran Şehir

9 October 2024	Ankara Demirspor (3)	1–1 (a.e.t.) (4–3 p)	Mazıdağı Fosfatspor (4)	Ankara
14:00	Çördek 18'		Bakar 41'	Stadium: TCDD Ankara Demirspor
	Penalties
	Olgaç (penalty scored); Karadeniz (penalty scored); Artuç (penalty scored); Dama (penalty scored)		(penalty scored) Bakar; (penalty scored) Keskin; (penalty scored) Doğan

9 October 2024	Bayburt Özel İdarespor (4)	2–0	İzmir Çoruhlu (4)	Bayburt
14:00	Aydın 65' (pen.); Delimehmet 69'			Stadium: Bayburt Genç Osman

9 October 2024	Beykoz İshaklı (4)	2–6	Mardin 1969 (4)	Beykoz
14:00	Semiz 4' (pen.); Mumcu 61'		Kılıç 12', 42', 56'; Salih 82'; Sarıdoğan 84'; Dilek 90+4'	Stadium: Alemdağ

9 October 2024	Bitlis Özgüzelderespor (5)	1–1 (a.e.t.) (3–4 p)	Kelkit Hürriyetspor (4)	Bitlis
14:00	Kara 1'		Dege 82'	Stadium: Bitlis 8 Eylül

9 October 2024	Çayelispor (4)	0–2	Yeşil Yalova (5)	Rize
14:00	Uysal 40'; Öztürk 89'			Stadium: Çayeli İlçe

9 October 2024	Ergene Velimeşe (4)	1–0	Çankayaspor (4)	Tekirdag
14:00	Aslan 35'			Stadium: Mustafa Kemal Atatürk

9 October 2024	Etimesgut Belediyespor (4)	2–1	Şırnak Petrolspor (5)	Ankara
14:00	Çelik 36'; Koca 66'		Yıldırım 41'	Stadium: Etimesgut Belediyesi Atatürk

9 October 2024	Fatsa Belediyespor (4)	2–1 (a.e.t.)	Silifke Belediyespor (4)	Ordu
14:00	Balata 4'; Öztürk 97'		Kartal 90+3' (o.g.)	Stadium: Fatsa İlçe

9 October 2024	Kahramanmaraşspor (4)	0–3	Çorluspor 1947 (4)	Kahramanmaras
14:00			Beytaş 23'; Doğan 35'; Çapkan 84'	Stadium: Batıpark Adem Şahan

9 October 2024	Karabük İdman Yurdu (4)	0–4	Bursa Nilüfer (4)	Karabuk
14:00			Hanlı 20' (pen.); Özyürek 23'; Balçık 56'; Uysal 81'	Stadium: Dr. Necmettin Şeyhoğlu

9 October 2024	Küçükçekmece Sinopspor (4)	7–3	Altınordu (3)	Sinop
14:00	Keleş 8'; Gümüş 10', 21', 73'; Karaca 40', 90+2'; Kanıtemiz 90+5'		Gencel 12'; Kaçmaz 14'; Duru 87'	Stadium: İBB 100. Yıl

9 October 2024	Muğlaspor (4)	4–4 (a.e.t.) (2–4 p)	Sarıyer (3)	Mugla
14:00	Sertakan 6'; Çalışan 90+9'; Demir 91'; Yılmaz 105' (pen.)		Açıkgöz 30', 45+2'; Dönmez 94'; Öztürk 105+2'	Stadium: Muğla Atatürk
	Penalties
	Çalışan (penalty scored); Bülbül (penalty scored)		(penalty scored) Açıkgöz; (penalty scored) Öztürk; (penalty scored) Dönmez; (penalty scored) Çetin

9 October 2024	Nazilli Belediyespor (3)	1–5	Somaspor (3)	Aydin
14:00	Türközü 33'		Başaran 8'; Şentürk 61' (pen.), 72'; Karış 86', 89'	Stadium: Nazilli İlçe

9 October 2024	Niğde Belediyesispor (4)	1–0	68 Aksarayspor (3)	Nigde
14:00	Polat 52'			Stadium: Niğde Ömer Halisdemir Üniversitesi

9 October 2024	Beykoz Anadoluspor (3)	0–3	Tire 2021 (4)	Beykoz
14:00			Elkatmış 17', 26'; Çakmak 31'	Stadium: Sancaktepe 15 Temmuz

9 October 2024	Yozgat Belediyesi Bozokspor (4)	0–2	Kırklarelispor (3)	Yozgat
14:00			Güneş 47'; Dikbasan 78'	Stadium: Sorgun İlçe

9 October 2024	Altay (3)	0–1	Karaman (3)	Izmir
15:00			Tankul 66' (pen.)	Stadium: Alsancak Mustafa Denizli

9 October 2024	Giresunspor (3)	0–1	Viranşehir Belediyespor (4)	Giresun
19:00			İpekci 22'	Stadium: Çotanak

10 October 2024	Osmaniyespor (4)	3–0	Diyarbekirspor (3)	Osmaniye
13:00	Kuçik 103'			Stadium: 7 Ocak

10 October 2024	Bulvarspor (4)	0–1	İnegölspor (3)	Kartal
14:00			Aktay 90+4'	Stadium: Bulvar Mimar Kubilay Köse

10 October 2024	Büyükçekmece Tepecikspor (4)	0–1	Serik Belediyespor (3)	Büyükçekmece
14:00			Yılmaz 6'	Stadium: Tepecik Şenol Güneş

10 October 2024	Türk Metal 1963 (4)	1–3	Pazarspor (4)	Kirikkale
14:00	Taşci 90'		Çelik 29'; Özkan 68'; Başparmak 89'	Stadium: Osmanlı

10 October 2024	Uşakspor (4)	0–1	Bursaspor (4)	Usak
15:00			Bayrak 60'	Stadium: Uşak 1 Eylül

10 October 2024	Erciyes 38 (4)	2–1 (a.e.t.)	Orduspor 1967 (4)	Kayseri
19:00	Yeşilbaş 46'; Erbaşı 98'		Tatlısu 67'	Stadium: RHG Enertürk Enerji

== Third round ==
4 Super League, 7 First League, 18 Second League, 39 Third League, 2 Regional Amateur League teams competed in this round. Seeds were applied in the single-leg round. The draw was held on 15 October 2024. The match schedules were announced on 17 October 2024. 23 seeded and 12 unseeded teams qualified for the next round. 3 Super League, 3 First League, 13 Second League and 16 Third League teams qualified to the next round. The biggest upset was Çorluspor 1947 (129) eliminating Adanaspor (34). The lowest-ranked team qualified for the next round was Tire 2021 (135). The highest-ranked team eliminated was Kayserispor (14).

Number of teams per tier still in competition
Super League	First League	Second League	Third League	Amateur League	Total
19 / 19	20 / 20	27 / 36	39 / 64	2 / 16	107 / 155

=== Seedings ===
Seeded (35)			Unseeded (35)		
Samsunspor	Beyoğlu Yeni Çarşı	Adana 1954 Futbol Kulübü	Ayvalıkgücü Belediyespor	Belediye Kütahyaspor	23 Elazığ
Kayserispor	Karacabey Belediyespor	Batman Petrolspor	Silivrispor	1923 Mustafakemalpaşa	Kelkit Hürriyetspor
Hatayspor	Somaspor	Karaköprü Belediyespor	Muşspor	Anadolu Üniversitesi	Kırıkkale
Konyaspor	Ankara Demirspor	Elazığspor	Bornova 1877	Mardin 1969	Bayburt Özel İdarespor
MKE Ankaragücü	İnegölspor	Erbaaspor	52 Orduspor	Ağrı 1970	Viranşehir Belediyespor
Fatih Karagümrük	Fethiyespor	Etimesgut Belediyespor	Turgutluspor	Küçükçekmece Sinopspor	Çorluspor 1947
Pendikspor	Kırklarelispor	Bursaspor	Tokat Belediye Plevnespor	Pazarspor	Bursa Nilüfer
İstanbulspor	Karaman	Adıyaman	İnegöl Kafkas Gençlikspor	Fatsa Belediyespor	Tire 2021
Adanaspor	Sarıyer	Aliağa Futbol A.Ş.	Efeler 09	Amasyaspor	Niğde Belediyesispor
Şanlıurfaspor	Serik Belediyespor	Sebat Gençlikspor	Kuşadasıspor	Osmaniyespor	Kilis Belediyespor
Yeni Malatyaspor	Belediye Derincespor	Karşıyaka	Alanya 1221	Erciyes 38	Yeşil Yalova
Isparta 32	Kepezspor		Edirnespor	Ergene Velimeşe	

=== Matches ===
29 October 2024	Bursa Nilüfer (4)	2–3	MKE Ankaragücü (2)	Bursa
13:00	Gündoğdu 41'; Çift 62'		Saponara 4'; Varga 55'; Cephas 68'	Stadium: İbrahim Yazıcı Nilüfer

29 October 2024	Alanya 1221 (4)	2–1 (a.e.t.)	Adıyaman (4)	Antalya
13:30	Aydoğdu 70'; Atak 120+1'		Yeşilkaya 64'	Stadium: Alanya Milli Egemenlik

29 October 2024	Bornova 1877 (4)	0–2	Fethiyespor (3)	Izmir
13:30			Dereli 84', 85'	Stadium: İzmir Atatürk

29 October 2024	Sarıyer (3)	1–0	Niğde Belediyesispor (4)	Istanbul
13:30	Ayaroğlu 79' (pen.)			Stadium: Yusuf Ziya Öniş

29 October 2024	Etimesgut Belediyespor (4)	2–0	Mardin 1969 (4)	Ankara
13:30	Şahin 29'; Yılmaz 69'			Stadium: Etimesgut Belediyesi Atatürk

29 October 2024	Fatih Karagümrük (2)	1–0	Tokat Belediye Plevnespor (4)	Istanbul
15:00	Ülvan 66'			Stadium: Atatürk Olimpiyat

29 October 2024	23 Elazığ (4)	0–4	Konyaspor (1)	Elazig
17:30			Bostan 25', 73'; Kabak 61'; Subaşı 66' (pen.)	Stadium: Elazığ Atatürk

29 October 2024	Adanaspor (2)	1–2 (a.e.t.)	Çorluspor 1947 (4)	Adana
20:30	Tapsoba 68'		Çapkan 86'; Uluğ 112'	Stadium: Yeni Adana

30 October 2024	Ağrı 1970 (4)	0–1	Beyoğlu Yeni Çarşı (3)	Agri
12:00			Aydınlık 90+3'	Stadium: Vali Lütfü Yeğenoğlu

30 October 2024	Muşspor (4)	2–1	İnegölspor (3)	Mus
13:00	Balsu 21'; Öz 33'		Utlu 90+2'	Stadium: Muş Şehir

30 October 2024	Silivrispor (4)	4–2	Kayserispor (1)	Istanbul
13:00	Aktas 38', 44'; Saygi 66'; Patan 88'		Sarıarslan 32' (pen.); Bahoken 59'	Stadium: Silivri Müjdat Gürsu

30 October 2024	Aliağa (4)	2–3 (a.e.t.)	Anadolu Üniversitesi (4)	Izmir
13:30	Karaahmet 48'; Gölbaşı 114'		Kaya 34'; Çakır 108'; Burgaz 117'	Stadium: Aliağa Atatürk

30 October 2024	Ankara Demirspor (3)	3–0	Erciyes 38 (4)	Ankara
13:30	Yıldırım 18' (pen.); Kumlu 83'; Yılmaz 90+5'			Stadium: TCDD Ankara Demirspor

30 October 2024	Belediye Derincespor (3)	0–1	Tire 2021 (4)	Kocaeli
13:30			Baştan 65'	Stadium: Belediye Derincespor Doğal Çim

30 October 2024	Elazığspor (3)	2–0 (a.e.t.)	1923 Mustafakemalpaşa (4)	Elazig
13:30	Ekici 93'; Koldaş 105'			Stadium: Elazığ Doğukent

30 October 2024	Ergene Velimeşe (4)	0–3	Sebat Gençlikspor (4)	Tekirdag
13:30			Alsan 67'; Bulut 76' (pen.); Sönmezsoy 82'	Stadium: Mustafa Kemal Atatürk

30 October 2024	Somaspor (3)	0–1	Belediye Kütahyaspor (4)	Manisa
13:30			Özbilen 77'	Stadium: Soma Atatürk

30 October 2024	Fatsa Belediyespor (4)	1–2	Karaman (3)	Ordu
13:30	Yağcı 86'		Tankul 62'; Vural 65'	Stadium: Fatsa İlçe

30 October 2024	Karacabey Belediyespor (3)	3–0	Amasyaspor (4)	Bursa
13:30	Yağcı 35'; Aydemir 62', 90+3'			Stadium: Karacabey M. Fehmi Gerçeker

30 October 2024	Karşıyaka (4)	1–1 (a.e.t.) (4–3 p)	Viranşehir Belediyespor (4)	Izmir
13:30	Yılmaz 111'		Altın 109'	Stadium: Alsancak Mustafa Denizli
	Penalties
	Altunbaş (penalty scored); Ozan (penalty missed); Torlak (penalty scored); Gayla (penalty scored); Yılmaz (penalty scored)		(penalty scored) İpekçi; (penalty missed) Çetinbaş; (penalty missed) Aydın; (penalty scored) Karayer; (penalty scored) Aşık

30 October 2024	Küçükçekmece Sinopspor (4)	3–2	Erbaaspor (3)	Istanbul
13:30	Birdal 37', 90'; Işık 68'		Kanarya 4' (pen.); Balcı 86'	Stadium: İBB 100. Yıl

30 October 2024	Kelkit Hürriyetspor (4)	0–0 (a.e.t.) (2–3 p)	Kepezspor (3)	Gumushane
13:30				Stadium: Kelkit İlçe
	Penalties
	Dege (penalty missed); Özdemir (penalty scored); İyik (penalty missed); Karaosmanoğlu (penalty scored); Temir (penalty missed)		(penalty scored) Fındıklı; (penalty scored) Kolak; (penalty missed) Korkmaz; (penalty scored) Dikmen

30 October 2024	Kırıkkale (4)	2–0	Yeni Malatyaspor (2)	Kirikkale
13:30	Vural 52'; Arslantaş 87'			Stadium: Başpınar

30 October 2024	Kuşadasıspor (4)	1–2	Karaköprü Belediyespor (3)	Aydin
13:30	Kilmen 7' (pen.)		Öner 55' (pen.); Özköroğlu 88'	Stadium: Kuşadası Özer Türk

30 October 2024	Osmaniyespor (4)	6–0	Serik Belediyespor (3)	Osmaniye
13:30	Özgün 3', 14', 33'; Yavuz 47'; Birinci 79'; Özdemir 84'			Stadium: 7 Ocak

30 October 2024	Yeşil Yalova (5)	0–4	Kırklarelispor (3)	Yalova
13:30			Taşdemir 11'; Güneş 22', 44'; Özyurt 53'	Stadium: Yalova Atatürk

30 October 2024	İnegöl Kafkas Gençlikspor (4)	0–4	Hatayspor (1)	Bursa
14:30			Strandberg 4'; Parmak 17'; Boutobba 35'; Temel 66'	Stadium: İnegöl İlçe

30 October 2024	Isparta 32 (3)	1–0	Pazarspor (4)	Isparta
17:30	İstemi 90+4'			Stadium: Isparta Atatürk

30 October 2024	52 Orduspor (4)	1–0	Şanlıurfaspor (2)	Ordu
20:30	Özcan 77'			Stadium: Yeni Ordu

31 October 2024	Bayburt Özel İdarespor (4)	0–0 (a.e.t.) (2–4 p)	Samsunspor (1)	Bayburt
13:00				Stadium: Bayburt Genç Osman
	Penalties
	Ayaydın (penalty scored); Albayrak (penalty scored); Atmaca (penalty missed); Aygün (penalty missed)		(penalty scored) Köroğlu; (penalty scored) Schindler; (penalty missed) Dimata; (penalty scored) Çift; (penalty scored) Gönül

31 October 2024	Efeler 09 (4)	1–2	Adana 01 (3)	Aydin
13:30	Çelik 50'		Yıldızaç 13'; Aliçay 20' (o.g.)	Stadium: Didim Atatürk

31 October 2024	Pendikspor (2)	1–2	Ayvalıkgücü Belediyespor (4)	Istanbul
13:30	Kaya 90+5'		Habeşoğlu 90'; Taşer 105'	Stadium: Pendik

31 October 2024	Edirnespor (4)	0–1	Batman Petrolspor (3)	Edirne
14:30			Çiçek 33'	Stadium: Edirne 25 Kasım

31 October 2024	İstanbulspor (2)	4–2	Kilis Belediyespor (5)	Istanbul
17:30	Sambissa 28'; Mermerci 45+1'; Diarra 59'; Aydın 90+3'		Bostancı 57' (pen.); Çapakçur 72'	Stadium: Esenyurt Necmi Kadıoğlu

31 October 2024	Bursaspor (4)	3–1	Turgutluspor (4)	Bursa
20:30	Akçay 33'; Cengiz 53' (pen.); Yılmaz 90+6'		Atsız 64'	Stadium: Yüzüncü Yıl Atatürk

=== Upsets ===
Giantkiller	Opponent (tier)
Upset of three leagues above
Silivrispor (level 4)	4–2 at home vs Kayserispor (level 1)
Upset of two leagues above
Çorluspor (level 4)	2–1 away vs Adanaspor (level 2)
Kırıkkale (level 4)	2–0 at home vs Yeni Malatyaspor (level 2)
52 Orduspor (level 4)	1–0 at home vs Şanlıurfaspor (level 2)
Ayvalıkgücü Belediyespor (level 4)	2–1 away vs Pendikspor (level 2)

== Fourth round ==
8 Super League, 12 First League, 22 Second League and 16 Third League teams competed in this round. Seeds were applied in the single-leg round. The draw was held on 5 November 2024. The match schedules were announced on 12 November 2024. 23 seeded and 6 unseeded teams qualified for the next round. 7 Super League, 9 First League, 9 Second League and 4 Third League teams qualified to the next round. The biggest upset was Çorluspor 1947 (129) eliminating Manisa (32). The lowest-ranked team qualified for the next round was Çorluspor 1947 (129). The highest-ranked team eliminated was Samsunspor (13).

Number of teams per tier still in competition
Super League	First League	Second League	Third League	Amateur League	Total
18 / 19	16 / 20	22 / 36	16 / 64	0 / 16	72 / 155

=== Seedings ===
Seeded (29)			Unseeded (29)		
Alanyaspor	İstanbulspor	Kastamonuspor	Isparta 32	Batman Petrolspor	52 Orduspor
Çaykur Rizespor	Gençlerbirliği	Vanspor	Beyoğlu Yeni Çarşı	Karaköprü Belediyespor	Alanya 1221
Antalyaspor	Bandırmaspor	Bucaspor 1928	Karacabey Belediyespor	Elazığspor	Belediye Kütahyaspor
Gaziantep	Erzurumspor	1461 Trabzon	Ankara Demirspor	Etimesgut Belediyespor	Anadolu Üniversitesi
Adana Demirspor	Ümraniyespor	24 Erzincanspor	Fethiyespor	Bursaspor	Küçükçekmece Sinopspor
Samsunspor	Manisa	Menemen	Kırklarelispor	Sebat Gençlikspor	Osmaniyespor
Hatayspor	Ankara Keçiörengücü	Ankaraspor	Karaman	Karşıyaka	Kırıkkale
Konyaspor	Esenler Erokspor	İskenderunspor	Sarıyer	Ayvalıkgücü Belediyespor	Çorluspor 1947
MKE Ankaragücü	Amed	Yeni Mersin İdmanyurdu	Kepezspor	Silivrispor	Tire 2021
Fatih Karagümrük	Iğdır		Adana 01	Muşspor	

=== Matches ===
3 December 2024	Iğdır (2)	2–3	Muşspor (4)	Igdir
13:00	Aleksic 4'; Özlesen 27'	Report	Çelik 20'; Alkan 34', 58'	Stadium: Iğdır Şehir; Referee: Feridun Daldaş

3 December 2024	Bandırmaspor (2)	2–3 (a.e.t.)	Karacabey Belediyespor (3)	Balikesir
13:30	Bozkurt 65'; Dilek 90+6'	Report	Yağcı 17'; Badak 89'; Görgüç 120+1'	Stadium: Bandırma 17 Eylül; Referee: İlker Yasin Avcı

3 December 2024	Antalyaspor (1)	4–1	Küçükçekmece Sinopspor (4)	Antalya
15:30	Gaich 16'; Uzun 22'; Van de Streek 54'; Townsend 90+1'	Report	İlkin 52'	Stadium: Corendon Airlines Park Antalya; Referee: Yiğit Arslan

3 December 2024	Adana Demirspor (1)	4–3 (a.e.t.)	Sebat Gençlikspor (4)	Adana
18:00	Kalender 50'; Güler 59'; Shehu 62'; Kurtulan 103'	Report	Gülen 34', 40'; Balcı 66' (pen.)	Stadium: Yeni Adana; Referee: Erkan Özdamar

3 December 2024	Samsunspor (1)	2–4 (a.e.t.)	52 Orduspor (4)	Samsun
20:30	Kara 25' (pen.); Aydoğdu 41'	Report	Özcan 16'; Atasoy 79' (pen.); Köse 96'; Bilen 105+1'	Stadium: Samsun Yeni 19 Mayıs; Referee: Gürcan Hasova

4 December 2024	Alanyaspor (1)	4–1	Fethiyespor (3)	Antalya
13:00	Janvier 11'; Balkovec 15'; Lopes 28'; Usluoğlu 81'	Report	Türkmen 84'	Stadium: Gain Park; Referee: Ümit Öztürk

4 December 2024	Amed (2)	1–0 (a.e.t.)	Adana 01 (3)	Diyarbakir
13:30	Lovrić 97' (pen.)	Report		Stadium: Diyarbakır; Referee: Eren Özyemişçioğlu

4 December 2024	Anadolu Üniversitesi (4)	1–2	Bucaspor 1928 (3)	Eskisehir
13:30	Çolak 28'	Report	Öztekin 19', 90+6' (pen.)	Stadium: Osmangazi Üniversitesi; Referee: Melih Aldemir

4 December 2024	Çorluspor 1947 (4)	4–2	Manisa (2)	Tekirdag
13:30	Doğan 49', 73'; Uluğ 61'; Ayan 90+4'	Report	Osuji 36'; Kahya 38'	Stadium: General Basri Asan; Referee: Raşit Yorgancılar

4 December 2024	Erzurumspor (2)	3–2	Ayvalıkgücü Belediyespor (4)	Erzurum
13:30	Özhan 4'; Tasev 28'; Kılınç 55' (pen.)	Report	Çelikel 6'; Cebeci 85' (pen.)	Stadium: Erzurum Kazım Karabekir; Referee: Burak Olcar

4 December 2024	Fatih Karagümrük (2)	3–0	Sarıyer (3)	Istanbul
13:30	Demiroğlu 39'; Akgün 85'; Mert 87' (pen.)	Report		Stadium: Atatürk Olimpiyat; Referee: Çağdaş Altay

4 December 2024	Gençlerbirliği (2)	1–0 (a.e.t.)	Belediye Kütahyaspor (4)	Ankara
13:30	Nalepa 105'	Report		Stadium: Eryaman; Referee: Yunus Dursun

4 December 2024	İskenderunspor (3)	4–1	Tire 2021 (4)	Hatay
13:30	Çolak 8'; Khalil 26'; Çölbeyi 33'; Işılak 59'	Report	Elkatmış 90+1'	Stadium: Kırıkhan İlçe; Referee: Melih Kurt

4 December 2024	İstanbulspor (2)	4–1	Alanya 1221 (4)	Istanbul
13:30	Şen 41'; Ologo 50'; Kurt 84'; Sambissa 89'	Report	Saydam 90+2'	Stadium: Esenyurt Necmi Kadıoğlu; Referee: Alpaslan Şen

4 December 2024	Ankara Keçiörengücü (2)	4–2	Beyoğlu Yeni Çarşı (3)	Ankara
13:30	Diouf 4', 24', 69'; Çalışkan 35'	Report	Aydınlık 9'; Kaçan 47'	Stadium: Aktepe; Referee: Davut Dakul Çelik

4 December 2024	Menemen (3)	3–0	Elazığspor (3)	Izmir
13:30	Demir 28', 74' (pen.); Kulet 84'	Report		Stadium: Menemen İlçe; Referee: Tayfun Güz

4 December 2024	Ankaraspor (3)	1–2 (a.e.t.)	Etimesgut Belediyespor (4)	Ankara
13:30	Yılmaz 85'	Report	Koca 82'; Bayrak 108'	Stadium: Sincan 15 Temmuz Milli Birlik; Referee: Burak Doğru

4 December 2024	Yeni Mersin İdmanyurdu (3)	0–2	Kırklarelispor (3)	Mersin
13:30		Report	Karataş 78'; Derici 80'	Stadium: Mersin; Referee: Ahmet Resuloğlu

4 December 2024	1461 Trabzon (3)	3–1	Kırıkkale (4)	Trabzon
13:30	Karakuş 9', 90+5'; Sürgülü 63'	Report	Arslantaş 72'	Stadium: Of İlçe; Referee: Berk Sipahi

4 December 2024	24 Erzincanspor (3)	3–0	Karaköprü Belediyespor (3)	Erzincan
13:30	Köse 70', 81'; Çağlar 79'	Report		Stadium: Erzincan 13 Şubat Şehir; Referee: Berkan Çetin

4 December 2024	Karşıyaka (4)	1–2	MKE Ankaragücü (2)	Izmir
15:30	Gayla 90'	Report	Cephas 15'; Bekiroğlu 81'	Stadium: Alsancak Mustafa Denizli; Referee: Süleyman Bahadır

4 December 2024	Konyaspor (1)	9–0	Kepezspor (3)	Konya
18:00	Kramer 7', 45+2'; Bostan 11', 69', 85'; Prip 36'; Taşçı 42'; Aleksic 77'; İbrahimoğlu 89'			Stadium: Medaş Konya Büyükşehir

4 December 2024	Bursaspor (4)	2–2 (a.e.t.) (6–7 p)	Vanspor (3)	Bursa
20:30	Dalkıran 65'; Özek 89'		Kavaklıdere 68'; Kör 74'	Stadium: Yüzüncü Yıl Atatürk
	Penalties
	Özek (penalty scored); Cengiz (penalty scored); Akçay (penalty scored); Çağıran (penalty scored); Sakı (penalty scored); Yiğit (penalty missed); Güney (penalty scored); Depe (penalty missed)		(penalty scored) Kara; (penalty scored) Bavuk; (penalty scored) Bingöl; (penalty scored) Doğan; (penalty scored) Örnek; (penalty missed) Seçgin; (penalty scored) Kavlak; (penalty scored) Çavuşoğlu

5 December 2024	Ümraniyespor (2)	3–2	Isparta 32 (3)	Istanbul
13:00	Çelik 45'; Arıcı 69'; Bardhi 84'		Koca 6'; Bora 80'	Stadium: Spoint İnşaat Ümraniyespor

5 December 2024	Ankara Demirspor (3)	1–3	Kastamonuspor (3)	Ankara
13:30	Karadaş 2'		Bilgiç 55'; Çaylı 63'; Baykuş 81'	Stadium: TCDD Ankara Demirspor

5 December 2024	Karaman (3)	0–2	Esenler Erokspor (2)	Karaman
13:30			Hidayetoğlu 20'; Furat 81'	Stadium: Yeni Karaman

5 December 2024	Hatayspor (1)	5–0	Osmaniyespor (4)	Mersin
15:30	Strandberg 23', 45+1'; Pedro 66'; Bamgboye 74'; Aboubakar 90+2'			Stadium: Mersin

5 December 2024	Çaykur Rizespor (1)	3–2	Silivrispor (4)	Rize
18:00	Papanikolaou 31', 47'; Zeqiri 85'		Aktaş 21', 54'	Stadium: Çaykur Didi

5 December 2024	Gaziantep (1)	1–0	Batman Petrolspor (3)	Gaziantep
20:30	Kodro 90+2'			Stadium: Gaziantep

=== Upsets ===
Giantkiller	Opponent (tier)
Upset of three leagues above
52 Orduspor (level 4)	4–2 away vs Samsunspor (level 1)
Upset of two leagues above
Muşspor (level 4)	3–2 away vs Iğdır (level 2)
Çorluspor (level 4)	4–2 at home vs Manisa (level 2)

== Fifth round ==
12 Super League, 13 First League, 9 Second League and 4 Third League teams competed in this round. Seeds were applied in the single-leg round. The draw was held on 6 December 2024.The match schedules were announced on 12 November 2024. 16 seeded and 3 unseeded teams qualified for the next round. 10 Super League, 7 First League and 2 Second League teams qualified to the next round. The biggest upset was Kırklarelispor (60) eliminating Adana Demirspor (12). The lowest-ranked team qualified for the next round was Kırklarelispor (60). The highest-ranked team eliminated was Adana Demirspor (12).

Number of teams per tier still in competition
Super League	First League	Second League	Third League	Amateur League	Total
17 / 19	13 / 20	9 / 36	4 / 64	0 / 16	43 / 155

=== Seedings ===
Seeded (19)			Unseeded (19)		
Kasımpaşa	Hatayspor	İstanbulspor	Gençlerbirliği	Vanspor	Kırklarelispor
Sivasspor	Konyaspor	Sakaryaspor	Erzurumspor	Bucaspor 1928	Etimesgut Belediyespor
Alanyaspor	Eyüpspor	Çorum	Ümraniyespor	1461 Trabzon	Muşspor
Çaykur Rizespor	Göztepe	Kocaelispor	Ankara Keçiörengücü	24 Erzincanspor	52 Orduspor
Antalyaspor	Bodrum	Boluspor	Esenler Erokspor	Menemen	Çorluspor 1947
Gaziantep	MKE Ankaragücü		Amed	İskenderunspor	
Adana Demirspor	Fatih Karagümrük		Kastamonuspor	Karacabey Belediyespor	

=== Matches ===
17 December 2024	Eyüpspor (1)	4–1	Etimesgut Belediyespor (4)	Istanbul
13:00	Mor 27'; Bruno 34', 51' (pen.), 73' (pen.)	Report	Koç 44'	Stadium: Recep Tayyip Erdoğan; Referee: Ömer Tolga Güldibi

17 December 2024	Konyaspor (1)	1–0	Karacabey Belediyespor (3)	Konya
15:30	Nayir 90' (pen.)	Report		Stadium: Medaş Konya Büyükşehir; Referee: Fatih Tokail

17 December 2024	Çaykur Rizespor (1)	6–0	Vanspor (3)	Rize
18:00	Jurecka 19'; Bulut 24'; Zeqiri 34', 84'; Varesanovic 43', 45+2'			Stadium: Çaykur Didi

17 December 2024	Alanyaspor (1)	3–2	Amed (2)	Antalya
20:30	Bulut 10'; Lima 59'; Makouta 75'		Cassubie 40'; Koç 85'	Stadium: Gain Park

18 December 2024	Boluspor (2)	4–0	1461 Trabzon (3)	Bolu
13:00	Nas 46', 64'; Koç 61'; Babacar 77'			Stadium: Bolu Atatürk

18 December 2024	Çorluspor 1947 (4)	2–3	Kocaelispor (2)	Tekirdag
13:00	Beytaş 3'; Doğan 47'		Gedik 13'; Çağlayan 57'; Öztonga 78'	Stadium: General Basri Asan

18 December 2024	Esenler Erokspor (2)	1–2	İstanbulspor (2)	Istanbul
13:00	Furat 21'		Özer 29', 76'	Stadium: Esenler Erokspor

18 December 2024	Kastamonuspor (3)	1–6	Bodrum (1)	Kastamonu
13:00	Kuşan 70'		Brazao 30', 57'; Puscas 42' (pen.), 55', 62'; Bayrakdar 78'	Stadium: Gazi

18 December 2024	Ankara Keçiörengücü (2)	1–4	Sivasspor (1)	Ankara
13:00	Taşbakır 4'		Menig 32', 60'; Başsan 38'; Böke 57' (pen.)	Stadium: Aktepe

18 December 2024	Muşspor (4)	1–1 (a.e.t.) (3–4 p)	Antalyaspor (1)	Mus
13:00	Karaoğlu 45'		Balcı 82'	Stadium: Muş Şehir
	Penalties
	Yıldırım (penalty scored); Karaoğlu (penalty scored); Yılmaz (penalty missed); Öz (penalty scored); Yüksel (penalty missed)		(penalty scored) Samudio; (penalty scored) Van de Streek; (penalty scored) Kaluzinski; (penalty scored) Petrusenko

18 December 2024	Erzurumspor (2)	2–0	Sakaryaspor (2)	Erzurum
15:30	Tasev 40' (pen.); Bayrak 70'	Report		Stadium: Erzurum Kazım Karabekir; Referee: Ali Yılmaz

18 December 2024	Ümraniyespor (2)	1–2	Fatih Karagümrük (2)	Istanbul
15:30	Benny 10'	Report	Sivri 55', 66'	Stadium: Spoint İnşaat Ümraniyespor; Referee: Mehmet Ali Özer

18 December 2024	Menemen (3)	2–3	MKE Ankaragücü (2)	Izmir
18:00	Demir 39' (pen.); Arkutcu 90+2'		Güneren 3'; Bekiroğlu 42'; Cephas 90'	Stadium: Menemen İlçe

18 December 2024	Gaziantep (1)	2–0	52 Orduspor (4)	Gaziantep
20:30	Kodro 61', 70'	Report		Stadium: Gaziantep; Referee: Davit Çelik

19 December 2024	İskenderunspor (3)	1–0	Hatayspor (1)	Hatay
13:00	Sağlam 43' (o.g.)			Stadium: Kırıkhan İlçe

19 December 2024	Kırklarelispor (3)	2–0	Adana Demirspor (1)	Kirklareli
14:30	Derici 64', 90+6'			Stadium: Kırklareli Atatürk

19 December 2024	Gençlerbirliği (2)	0–1	Kasımpaşa (1)	Ankara
17:00			Yiğit 8'	Stadium: Eryaman

19 December 2024	24 Erzincanspor (3)	4–6	Çorum (2)	Erzincan
17:00	Dülger 68'; Başaran 69', 76'; Sebetci 86'		Köse 3', 51'; Karadağ 50', 90+5'; Yalçınkaya 59'; Kaya 84' (pen.)	Stadium: Erzincan 13 Şubat Şehir

19 December 2024	Bucaspor 1928 (3)	0–4	Göztepe (1)	Izmir
20:00			Matsuki 2'; Tijanic 8'; Romulo 50'; Malak 79'	Stadium: Yeni Buca

=== Upsets ===
Giantkiller	Opponent (tier)
Upset of two leagues above
İskenderunspor (level 3)	1–0 at home vs Hatayspor (level 1)
Kırklarelispor (level 3)	2–0 at home vs Adana Demirspor (level 1)

== Group stage ==
The 24 teams participating in the group stage were divided into three pots of eight teams each based on ranking criteria. The draw was held on 20 December 2024. In the draw, two teams were placed into four groups, with one team taken from the top four and one from the bottom four of each pot. In the groups, each team played a total of three matches, one against a team from each pot. The top two teams from each group, a total of eight teams, advanced to the quarter-finals. In the event that two or more teams finished the group stage with the same points, the ranking was determined by applying the following criteria in order: (i) overall goal difference in the group stage, (ii) the total number of goals scored in the group stage, (iii) the number of wins in the group stage, (iv) the team with the lower disciplinary points. Disciplinary points were calculated as follows: each red card equalled 3 disciplinary points, and each yellow card equalled 1 disciplinary point. Only cards shown to players during group stage matches were considered in this calculation, and for red cards resulting from two yellow cards, the yellow card that led to the red card was not counted separately for disciplinary points. If the disciplinary points were also equal, the ranking was determined based on the seedings.

=== Pots ===
Pot 1		Pot 2		Pot 3	
Rank	Team	Rank	Team	Rank	Team
1	Beşiktaş	9	Çaykur Rizespor	21	Fatih Karagümrük
2	Galatasaray	10	Antalyaspor	23	İstanbulspor
3	Fenerbahçe	11	Gaziantep	25	Çorum
4	Trabzonspor	16	Konyaspor	26	Kocaelispor
5	İstanbul Başakşehir	17	Eyüpspor	27	Boluspor
6	Kasımpaşa	18	Göztepe	30	Erzurumspor
7	Sivasspor	19	Bodrum	50	İskenderunspor
8	Alanyaspor	20	MKE Ankaragücü	60	Kırklarelispor

=== Group A ===
Pos	Team	Pld	W	D	L	GF	GA	GD	Pts	TRA	İSK	ALA	RİZ	KAR	ANK
1	Trabzonspor	3	2	1	0	10	4	+6	7			3–0	5–2		
2	İskenderunspor	3	1	2	0	5	4	+1	5	2–2					
3	Alanyaspor	3	1	1	1	5	5	0	4					4–1	
4	Çaykur Rizespor	3	1	0	2	4	7	−3	3						2–1
5	Fatih Karagümrük	3	1	0	2	3	6	−3	3		1–2		1–0		
6	MKE Ankaragücü	3	0	2	1	3	4	−1	2		1–1	1–1			

Legend: Blue = home team win; Yellow = draw; Red = away team win.

7 January 2025	MKE Ankaragücü (2)	1–1	İskenderunspor (3)	Ankara
13:00	Varga 45'		Beşir 79'	Stadium: Eryaman; Referee: İlker Yasin Avcı

7 January 2025	Fatih Karagümrük (2)	1–0	Çaykur Rizespor (1)	Istanbul
15:30	Kurukalıp 86'			Stadium: Atatürk Olimpiyat; Referee: Reşat Onur Coşkunses

8 January 2025	Trabzonspor (1)	3–0	Alanyaspor (1)	Trabzon
18:00	Višća 51'; Banza 58'; Nwakaeme 69'	Report		Stadium: Papara Park; Referee: Atilla Karaoğlan

5 February 2025	İskenderunspor (3)	2–2	Trabzonspor (1)	Hatay
13:00	Beşir 27', 55'		Batagov 50'; Destan 70'	Stadium: Kırıkhan İlçe

5 February 2025	Çaykur Rizespor (1)	2–1	MKE Ankaragücü (2)	Rize
18:00	Varesanovic 10'; Jurecka 15' (pen.)		Coelho 77'	Stadium: Çaykur Didi

6 February 2025	Alanyaspor (1)	4–1	Fatih Karagümrük (2)	Antalya
18:30	Usluoğlu 7'; Çınar 24' (o.g.); Ceken 26'; Hadergjonaj 66' (pen.)	Report	Kalaycı 40'	Stadium: Gain Park; Referee: Burak Olcar

26 February 2025	Fatih Karagümrük (2)	1–2	İskenderunspor (3)	Istanbul
20:30	Mert 51' (pen.)		Zengin 5'; Polat 7'	Stadium: Atatürk Olimpiyat

26 February 2025	MKE Ankaragücü (2)	1–1	Alanyaspor (1)	Ankara
20:30	Rotariu 66'		Cordova 48'	Stadium: Eryaman

26 February 2025	Trabzonspor (1)	5–2	Çaykur Rizespor (1)	Trabzon
20:30	Lundstram 14'; Visca 41'; Mendy 45'; Cham 59'; Banza 83'		Jurecka 63' (pen.); Hojer 89'	Stadium: Papara Park

=== Group B ===
Pos	Team	Pld	W	D	L	GF	GA	GD	Pts	FEN	GÖZ	İST	GAZ	ERZ	KAS
1	Fenerbahçe	3	3	0	0	12	1	+11	9					5–0	
2	Göztepe	3	3	0	0	7	0	+7	9				1–0		
3	İstanbulspor	3	2	0	1	5	4	+1	6						2–0
4	Gaziantep	3	1	0	2	5	5	0	3	1–4		4–0			
5	Erzurumspor	3	0	0	3	0	9	−9	0		0–1	0–3			
6	Kasımpaşa	3	0	0	3	0	10	−10	0	0–3	0–5				

Legend: Blue = home team win; Yellow = draw; Red = away team win.

9 January 2025	Erzurumspor (2)	0–1	Göztepe (1)	Erzurum
13:00		Report	Victor Hugo 23'	Stadium: Erzurum Kazım Karabekir; Referee: Yunus Dursun

9 January 2025	Gaziantep (1)	4–0	İstanbulspor (2)	Gaziantep
18:00	Kodro 24', 88', 90+2'; Erdoğan 86'	Report		Stadium: Gaziantep; Referee: Adnan Deniz Kayatepe

9 January 2025	Kasımpaşa (1)	0–3	Fenerbahçe (1)	Istanbul
20:30		Report	En-Nesyri 2'; Akçiçek 27'; Elmaz 45+1'	Stadium: Recep Tayyip Erdoğan; Referee: Kadir Sağlam

5 February 2025	Fenerbahçe (1)	5–0	Erzurumspor (2)	Istanbul
20:30	Talisca 33'; Tosun 50' (pen.); Yandaş 78'; En-Nesyri 81', 89'			Stadium: Ülker

6 February 2025	İstanbulspor (2)	2–0	Kasımpaşa (1)	Istanbul
13:00	Krstovski 7', 32'			Stadium: Esenyurt Necmi Kadıoğlu

6 February 2025	Göztepe (1)	1–0	Gaziantep (1)	Izmir
20:45	Matsuki 58'	Report		Stadium: Gürsel Aksel; Referee: Batuhan Kolak

27 February 2025	Erzurumspor (2)	0–3	İstanbulspor (2)	Erzurum
16:00			Gültekin 65'; Özer 69', 88'	Stadium: Erzurum Kazım Karabekir

27 February 2025	Gaziantep (1)	1–4	Fenerbahçe (1)	Gaziantep
16:00	Husic 75'		Talisca 17', 27'; En Nesyri 23'; Kostic 83'	Stadium: Gaziantep

27 February 2025	Kasımpaşa (1)	0–5	Göztepe (1)	Istanbul
16:00			Juan 12'; Matsuki 38', 47'; Kanatsızkuş 50'; Sangare 73'	Stadium: Recep Tayyip Erdoğan

=== Group C ===
Pos	Team	Pld	W	D	L	GF	GA	GD	Pts	KON	GAL	BAŞ	EYÜ	ÇOR	BOL
1	Konyaspor	3	2	1	0	4	1	+3	7				3–1		
2	Galatasaray	3	1	2	0	6	3	+3	5	0–0		2–2			
3	İstanbul Başakşehir	3	1	2	0	6	3	+3	5					4–1	
4	Eyüpspor	3	1	1	1	2	3	−1	4			0–0			1–0
5	Çorum	3	1	0	2	3	6	−3	3	0–1					2–1
6	Boluspor	3	0	0	3	2	7	−5	0		1–4				

Legend: Blue = home team win; Yellow = draw; Red = away team win.

8 January 2025	Eyüpspor (1)	1–0	Boluspor (2)	Istanbul
15:30	Kutucu 70'	Report		Stadium: Recep Tayyip Erdoğan; Referee: Erdem Metoğlu

8 January 2025	Galatasaray (1)	2–2	İstanbul Başakşehir (1)	Istanbul
20:30	Sánchez 51'; Bardakcı 74'	Report	Türüç 35'; Piątek 53'	Stadium: Rams Park; Referee: Ali Şansalan

9 January 2025	Çorum (2)	0–1	Konyaspor (1)	Corum
15:30			Kramer 85'	Stadium: Çorum Şehir; Referee: Ömer Tolga Güldibi

4 February 2025	İstanbul Başakşehir (1)	4–1	Çorum (2)	Istanbul
15:30	Figueiredo 4', 25', 90+2'; Güreler 49'		Yalçınkaya 39'	Stadium: Başakşehir Fatih Terim

4 February 2025	Konyaspor (1)	3–1	Eyüpspor (1)	Konya
18:30	Aleksic 45+3'; Bostan 48'; Ndao 90+8'		Thiam 85'	Stadium: Medaş Konya Büyükşehir

6 February 2025	Boluspor (2)	1–4	Galatasaray (1)	Bolu
16:00	Isgandarli 12'	Report	Morata 21'; Aydın 44'; Demir 73'; Kutucu 74'	Stadium: Bolu Atatürk; Referee: Yiğit Arslan

26 February 2025	Çorum (2)	2–1	Boluspor (2)	Corum
15:00	Rençber 41'; Güler 77'		Işık 48'	Stadium: Çorum Şehir

27 February 2025	Eyüpspor (1)	0–0	İstanbul Başakşehir (1)	Istanbul
19:00				Stadium: Spoint İnşaat Ümraniyespor

27 February 2025	Galatasaray (1)	0–0	Konyaspor (1)	Istanbul
19:00				Stadium: Rams Park

=== Group D ===
Pos	Team	Pld	W	D	L	GF	GA	GD	Pts	BEŞ	BOD	KOC	ANT	KIR	SİV
1	Beşiktaş	3	3	0	0	5	1	+4	9					2–0	
2	Bodrum	3	2	1	0	8	5	+3	7				3–1		
3	Kocaelispor	3	2	0	1	7	4	+3	6						0–2
4	Antalyaspor	3	1	0	2	5	6	−1	3	1–2		3–1			
5	Kırklarelispor	3	0	1	2	5	9	−4	1		4–4	1–3			
6	Sivasspor	3	0	0	3	0	5	−5	0	0–1	0–1				

Legend: Blue = home team win; Yellow = draw; Red = away team win.

7 January 2025	Sivasspor (1)	0–1	Beşiktaş (1)	Sivas
19:00			Silva 20'	Stadium: BG Grup 4 Eylül; Referee: Halil Umut Meler

7 January 2025	Antalyaspor (1)	3–1	Kocaelispor (2)	Antalya
21:00	Yılmaz 9' (o.g.); Samudio 18'; Öztürk 69'		Marcao 90+1'	Stadium: Corendon Airlines Park Antalya; Referee: Raşit Yorgancılar

8 January 2025	Kırklarelispor (3)	4–4	Bodrum (1)	Kirklareli
13:00	Derici 6', 19', 45+2'; Karataş 47'	Report	Başol 31', 33'; Bayrakdar 37'; Dumanlı 72'	Stadium: Kırklareli Atatürk; Referee: Yiğit Arslan

4 February 2025	Kocaelispor (2)	0–2	Sivasspor (1)	Kocaeli
13:00			Bekiroğlu 43'; Gökay 90+5'	Stadium: Yıldız Entegre Kocaeli

4 February 2025	Beşiktaş (1)	2–0	Kırklarelispor (3)	Istanbul
20:30	Muçi 62'; João Mário 79'			Stadium: Atatürk Olimpiyat

5 February 2025	Bodrum (1)	3–1	Antalyaspor (1)	Muğla
15:30	Bayrakdar 6', 84'; Dimitrov 11'		Townsend 57'	Stadium: Bodrum İlçe

25 February 2025	Antalyaspor (1)	1–2	Beşiktaş (1)	Antalya
15:00	Milosevic 64'		Arroyo 10'; Silva 76'	Stadium: Corendon Airlines Park Antalya

25 February 2025	Kırklarelispor (3)	1–3	Kocaelispor (2)	Kirklareli
15:00	Özyurt 79'		Sagat 41', 45+1' (pen.), 54'	Stadium: Kırklareli Atatürk

25 February 2025	Sivasspor (1)	0–1	Bodrum (1)	Sivas
15:00			Brazao 38'	Stadium: BG Grup 4 Eylül

== Knockout phase ==
=== Bracket ===
Quarter-finals
Trabzonspor (a.e.t.)	3
Bodrum	2
Beşiktaş	1
Göztepe	3
Konyaspor	3
İskenderunspor	0
Fenerbahçe	1
Galatasaray	2

Semi-finals
Trabzonspor	2
Göztepe	0
Konyaspor	1
Galatasaray	5

Final
Trabzonspor	0
Galatasaray	3

=== Quarter-finals ===
The quarter-final matches were played among the eight teams that finished in the top two positions in their respective groups after the group stage matches, with a single-match elimination format. The draw was held on 6 February 2025. The match schedules were announced on 14 March 2025. The matchups were determined ensuring that teams that finished first in their groups were paired with teams that finished second in other groups. Teams that advanced from the same group could not face each other in the quarter-final stage. The matches were hosted at the home venues of the teams that finished first in their groups.

==== Pots ====
	Winner (Seeded)	Runner-up (Unseeded)
Group A	Trabzonspor	İskenderunspor
Group B	Fenerbahçe	Göztepe
Group C	Konyaspor	Galatasaray
Group D	Beşiktaş	Bodrum

==== Matches ====
1 April 2025	Konyaspor (1)	3–0	İskenderunspor (3)	Konya
20:30	Nayir 65'; İbrahimoğlu 84'; Calusic 90+2'			Stadium: Medaş Konya Büyükşehir

2 April 2025	Trabzonspor (1)	3–2 (a.e.t.)	Bodrum (1)	Trabzon
17:45	Banza 3'; Eskihellaç 22'; Zubkov 98'		Seferi 15'; Bardhi 20'	Stadium: Papara Park

2 April 2025	Fenerbahçe (1)	1–2	Galatasaray (1)	Istanbul
20:45	Szymański 45+2'		Osimhen 10', 27' (pen.)	Stadium: Ülker

3 April 2025	Beşiktaş (1)	1–3	Göztepe (1)	Istanbul
20:30	Muçi 30'		Rômulo 38', 79' (pen.), 81'	Stadium: Beşiktaş Park

=== Semi-finals ===
22 April 2025	Konyaspor (1)	1–5	Galatasaray (1)	Konya
20:30	Pedrinho 53'		Osimhen 26'; Torreira 42'; Sallai 47', 53'; Yusuf Demir 90+1'	Stadium: Medaş Konya Büyükşehir; Referee: Ali Yılmaz
Note: Abdullah Buğra Taşkınsoy was supposed to officiate the match, but he was unable to due to an illness just before the match. Taşkınsoy's duty was taken over by fourth official Ali Yılmaz.

24 April 2025	Trabzonspor (1)	2–0	Göztepe (1)	Trabzon
20:30	Tufan 78'; Zubkov 89'			Stadium: Papara Park

== Final ==
On 16 April 2025, the TFF announced that the final would take place at New Eskişehir Stadium in Eskişehir, Turkey. On 18 April 2025, the TFF announced that it would revise its previous decision, after they received a letter from the city governor to change the match venue decision.

14 May 2025
20:45 TRT

Trabzonspor	0–3	Galatasaray
	Report	Yılmaz 5'; Osimhen 46', 63'

Gaziantep Stadium, Gaziantep
Referee: Cihan Aydın

== Top scorers ==
Rank	Player	Club	Goals
1	(Bosnia and Herzegovina) Kenan Kodro	Gaziantep	6
1	(Turkey) Melih Bostan	Konyaspor	6
1	(Turkey) Okan Derici	Kırklarelispor	6
4	(Nigeria) Victor Osimhen	Galatasaray	5
5	(Turkey) Gökdeniz Bayrakdar	Bodrum	4
5	(Japan) Kuryu Matsuki	Göztepe	4
5	(Turkey) Mert Aktaş	Silivrispor	4
5	(Turkey) Osman Arslantaş	Kırıkkale	4
5	(Brazil) Rômulo Cardoso	Göztepe	4
5	(Morocco) Youssef En-Nesyri	Fenerbahçe	4
5	(Turkey) Yusuf Ali Özer	İstanbulspor	4

== Seedings ==
Seed	Team	Round	2024–25	2023–24	Rank	Seed	Team	Round	2024–25	2023–24	Rank	Seed	Team	Round	2024–25	2023–24	Rank
1	Beşiktaş	GS	SL	SL	CW	53	Beyoğlu Yeni Çarşı	3R	2L	2L	7 (1.44)	105	Silifke Belediyespor	2R	3L	3L	7 (1.21)
2	Galatasaray	GS	SL	SL	1	54	Karacabey Belediyespor	3R	2L	2L	8 (1.42)	106	Ağrı 1970	2R	3L	3L	8 (1.39)
3	Fenerbahçe	GS	SL	SL	2	55	Somaspor	2R	2L	2L	8 (1.39)	107	Küçükçekmece Sinopspor	2R	3L	3L	8 (1.36)
4	Trabzonspor	GS	SL	SL	3	56	Ankara Demirspor	2R	2L	2L	9 (1.39)	108	Balıkesirspor	2R	3L	3L	8 (1.18; -4)
5	İstanbul Başakşehir	GS	SL	SL	4	57	İnegölspor	2R	2L	2L	9 (1.36)	109	Pazarspor	2R	3L	3L	8 (1.18; -5)
6	Kasımpaşa	5R	SL	SL	5	58	Diyarbekirspor	2R	2L	2L	10 (1.25)	110	Fatsa Belediyespor	2R	3L	3L	9 (1.32)
7	Sivasspor	5R	SL	SL	7	59	Fethiyespor	2R	2L	2L	10 (1.22)	111	Karabük İdman Yurdu	2R	3L	3L	9 (1.25)
8	Alanyaspor	4R	SL	SL	8	60	Kırklarelispor	2R	2L	2L	11 (1.22)	112	Amasyaspor	2R	3L	3L	9 (1.18)
9	Çaykur Rizespor	4R	SL	SL	9	61	Karaman	2R	2L	2L	11 (1.17)	113	İzmir Çoruhlu	2R	3L	3L	9 (1.11)
10	Antalyaspor	4R	SL	SL	10	62	Altınordu	2R	2L	2L	12 (1.19)	114	Artvin Hopaspor	2R	3L	3L	10 (1.21)
11	Gaziantep	4R	SL	SL	11	63	68 Aksarayspor	2R	2L	2L	12 (1.17)	115	Bulvarspor	2R	3L	3L	10 (1.18)
12	Adana Demirspor	4R	SL	SL	12	64	Arnavutköy Belediyespor	2R	2L	2L	13 (1.17; -2)	116	Çankayaspor	2R	3L	3L	10 (1.11)
13	Samsunspor	3R	SL	SL	13	65	Afyonspor	2R	2L	2L	13 (1.17; -13)	117	Osmaniyespor	2R	3L	3L	10 (1.04)
14	Kayserispor	3R	SL	SL	14	66	Sarıyer	2R	2L	2L	14 (1.14)	118	Erciyes 38 (Note: The new name for Talasgücü Belediyespor, which played in 2023–24 Third League)	2R	3L	3L	11 (1.21)
15	Hatayspor	3R	SL	SL	15	67	Serik Belediyespor	2R	2L	2L	14 (1.11)	119	Ergene Velimeşe	2R	3L	3L	11 (1.14)
16	Konyaspor	3R	SL	SL	16	68	Belediye Derincespor	2R	2L	2L	15 (1.11)	120	23 Elazığ	1R	3L	3L	11 (1.11)
17	Eyüpspor	5R	SL	1L	1	69	Nazilli Belediyespor	2R	2L	2L	15 (1.08)	121	1922 Konyaspor	1R	3L	3L	11 (1)
18	Göztepe	5R	SL	1L	2	70	Kepezspor	3R	2L	3L	1 (2.5)	122	Kelkit Hürriyetspor	1R	3L	3L	12 (1.11)
19	Bodrum	5R	SL	1L	4	71	Adana 1954 Futbol Kulübü	3R	2L	3L	1 (2.25)	123	Nevşehir Belediyespor	1R	3L	3L	12 (1.07)
20	MKE Ankaragücü	3R	1L	SL	17	72	Batman Petrolspor	3R	2L	3L	1 (2.14; +35)	124	Kırıkkale	1R	3L	3L	12 (1.04)
21	Fatih Karagümrük	3R	1L	SL	18	73	Karaköprü Belediyespor	3R	2L	3L	1 (2.14; +27)	125	Bayburt Özel İdarespor	1R	3L	3L	12 (1)
22	Pendikspor	3R	1L	SL	19	74	Elazığspor	3R	2L	3L	2 (2.07)	126	Kahramanmaraşspor (Note: Did not play in 2023–24 Third League due to 2023 Turkey–Syria earthquakes)	1R	3L	3L	16 (0)
23	İstanbulspor	3R	1L	SL	20	75	Erbaaspor	3R	2L	3L	2 (2.04)	127	Kahramanmaraş İstiklalspor (Note: Did not play in 2023–24 Third League due to 2023 Turkey–Syria earthquakes)	1R	3L	3L	16 (0)
24	Sakaryaspor	5R	1L	1L	3	76	Etimesgut Belediyespor	1R	3L	2L	16 (1.11)	128	Viranşehir Belediyespor	2R	3L	AL	1 (2.33; +69)
25	Çorum	5R	1L	1L	5	77	Zonguldakspor	1R	3L	2L	16 (1.06)	129	Çorluspor 1947	2R	3L	AL	1 (2.33; +60)
26	Kocaelispor	5R	1L	1L	6	78	Düzcespor	1R	3L	2L	17 (1.03)	130	Mazıdağı Fosfatspor	2R	3L	AL	1 (2.23; +67)
27	Boluspor	5R	1L	1L	7	79	Kırşehir	1R	3L	2L	17 (0.64)	131	Beykoz İshaklı	2R	3L	AL	1 (2.23; +44)
28	Gençlerbirliği	4R	1L	1L	8	80	Denizlispor	1R	3L	2L	18 (0.89)	132	Muğlaspor	2R	3L	AL	1 (2.17)
29	Bandırmaspor	4R	1L	1L	9	81	Bursaspor	1R	3L	2L	18 (0.64)	133	Nilüfer Belediye	2R	3L	AL	1 (2.13; +66)
30	Erzurumspor	4R	1L	1L	10	82	Adıyaman	1R	3L	2L	19 (0.53)	134	Yozgat Belediyesi Bozokspor	2R	3L	AL	1 (2.13; +48)
31	Ümraniyespor	4R	1L	1L	11	83	Uşakspor	1R	3L	2L	19 (0.14)	135	Tire 2021	2R	3L	AL	1 (2.1)
32	Manisa	4R	1L	1L	12	84	Aliağa	3R	3L	3L	2 (2.36)	136	Çayelispor	2R	3L	AL	1 (2.03; +44)
33	Ankara Keçiörengücü	4R	1L	1L	13	85	Sebat Gençlikspor	3R	3L	3L	2 (1.79)	137	Niğde Belediyesispor	2R	3L	AL	1 (2.03; +33)
34	Adanaspor	3R	1L	1L	14	86	Karşıyaka	3R	3L	3L	3 (1.96)	138	Türk Metal 1963	2R	3L	AL	1 (2)
35	Şanlıurfaspor	3R	1L	1L	15	87	Ayvalıkgücü Belediyespor	3R	3L	3L	3 (1.86)	139	Polatlı 1926	2R	3L	AL	1 (1.93)
36	Yeni Malatyaspor	3R	1L	1L	19	88	Silivrispor	3R	3L	3L	3 (1.82)	140	12 Bingölspor	1R	AL	AL	2 (2.58)
37	Esenler Erokspor	4R	1L	2L	1 (2.31)	89	Muşspor	3R	3L	3L	3 (1.68)	141	Bitlis Özgüzelderespor	1R	AL	AL	2 (2.38)
38	Amed	4R	1L	2L	1 (2.25)	90	Bornova 1877	3R	3L	3L	4 (1.79)	142	Kilis Belediyespor	1R	AL	AL	3 (2.15)
39	Iğdır	4R	1L	2L	3	91	52 Orduspor	3R	3L	3L	4 (1.75)	143	Yeşil Yalova	1R	AL	AL	3 (2.04)
40	Tuzlaspor	2R	2L	1L	16	92	Turgutluspor	3R	3L	3L	4 (1.68)	144	Şırnak Petrolspor	1R	AL	AL	4 (1.96)
41	Altay	2R	2L	1L	17	93	Tokat Belediye Plevnespor	3R	3L	3L	4 (1.61)	145	Serhat Ardahanspor	1R	AL	AL	5 (1.63)
42	Giresunspor	2R	2L	1L	18	94	İnegöl Kafkas Gençlikspor	3R	3L	3L	5 (1.68; +7)	146	Yeni Çanspor	1R	AL	AL	5 (1.54)
43	Kastamonuspor	4R	2L	2L	2 (2.17)	95	Efeler 09	3R	3L	3L	5 (1.68; +3)	147	Hakkari Zapspor	1R	AL	AL	6 (1.58)
44	Vanspor	4R	2L	2L	2 (2.08)	96	Kuşadasıspor	3R	3L	3L	5 (1.61)	148	Bartınspor	1R	AL	AL	9 (1.23)
45	Bucaspor 1928	4R	2L	2L	3	97	Alanya Kestelspor	3R	3L	3L	5 (1.54)	149	Kars 36 Spor	1R	AL	AL	11 (0.88)
46	1461 Trabzon	4R	2L	2L	4 (2)	98	Edirnespor	3R	3L	3L	6 (1.57; +17)	150	Dersimspor	1R	AL	AL	11 (0.75)
47	24 Erzincanspor	4R	2L	2L	4 (1.83)	99	Belediye Kütahyaspor	3R	3L	3L	6 (1.57; +15)	151	Bozüyük Vitraspor	1R	AL	N.A.	N.A.
48	Menemen	4R	2L	2L	5 (1.81)	100	1923 Mustafakemalpaşa (Note: Played as part of Bursa Yıldırımspor)	3R	3L	3L	6 (1.5)	152	Bucak Belediye Oğuzhanspor	1R	AL	N.A.	N.A.
49	Ankaraspor	4R	2L	2L	5 (1.61)	101	Anadolu Üniversitesi	3R	3L	3L	6 (1.39)	153	Çankırı	1R	AL	N.A.	N.A.
50	İskenderunspor	4R	2L	2L	6 (1.67)	102	Orduspor 1967	2R	3L	3L	7 (1.46; +16)	154	Kurtalanspor	1R	AL	N.A.	N.A.
51	Yeni Mersin İdmanyurdu	4R	2L	2L	6 (1.61)	103	Mardin 1969	2R	3L	3L	7 (1.46; +6)	155	Sinopspor	1R	AL	N.A.	N.A.
52	Isparta 32	3R	2L	2L	7 (1.5)	104	Büyükçekmece Tepecikspor	2R	3L	3L	7 (1.39)						
