= Yusuf Tunç =

Turkish association football player

Personal information
- Full name: Yusuf Mert Tunç
- Date of birth: 18 September 2000 (age 26)
- Place of birth: Ilgaz, Çankırı, Turkey
- Height: 1.86 m (6 ft 1 in)
- Position: Forward

Team information
- Current team: Kırıkkale (on loan from İstanbulspor)
- Number: 10

Youth career
- 2012–2013: Seyrantepe Ofspor
- 2013: Beşiktaş
- 2013–2017: Dikilitas Spor
- 2017–2019: Fenerbahce

Senior career*
Years	Team	Apps	(Gls)
2019–2020	Fenerbahce	0	(0)
2019	→ Boluspor (loan)	2	(0)
2020–2021	Varzim	17	(1)
2021–	İstanbulspor	0	(0)
2021–2022	→ Esenler Erokspor (loan)	22	(3)
2022–2024	→ 52 Orduspor (loan)	46	(5)
2024–2025	→ Elazığspor (loan)	31	(13)
2025–2026	→ 52 Orduspor (loan)	18	(6)
2026–	→ Kırıkkale (loan)	9	(1)
- * Club domestic league appearances and goals as of 30 October 2026

Yusuf Mert Tunç (born 18 September 2000) is a Turkish footballer who plays as a forward for TFF 3. Lig club Kırıkkale on loan from İstanbulspor.

== Career statistics ==
=== Club ===
As of 13 March 2021.

Club	Season	League			Cup		Other		Total	
Club	Season	Division	Apps	Goals	Apps	Goals	Apps	Goals	Apps	Goals
Fenerbahce	2019–20	Süper Lig	0	0	0	0	0	0	0	0
Boluspor (loan)	2019–20	1. Lig	2	0	1 (Note: Appearances in the Turkish Cup)	0	0	0	3	0
Varzim	2019–20	LigaPro	3	0	0	0	0	0	3	0
Varzim	2020–21	Liga Portugal 2	14	1	1 (Note: Appearances in the Taça de Portugal)	0	0	0	15	1
Varzim	Total		17	1	1	0	0	0	18	1
Career total			19	1	2	0	0	0	21	1
