= Yunus Bahadır =

Belgian footballer (born 2002)

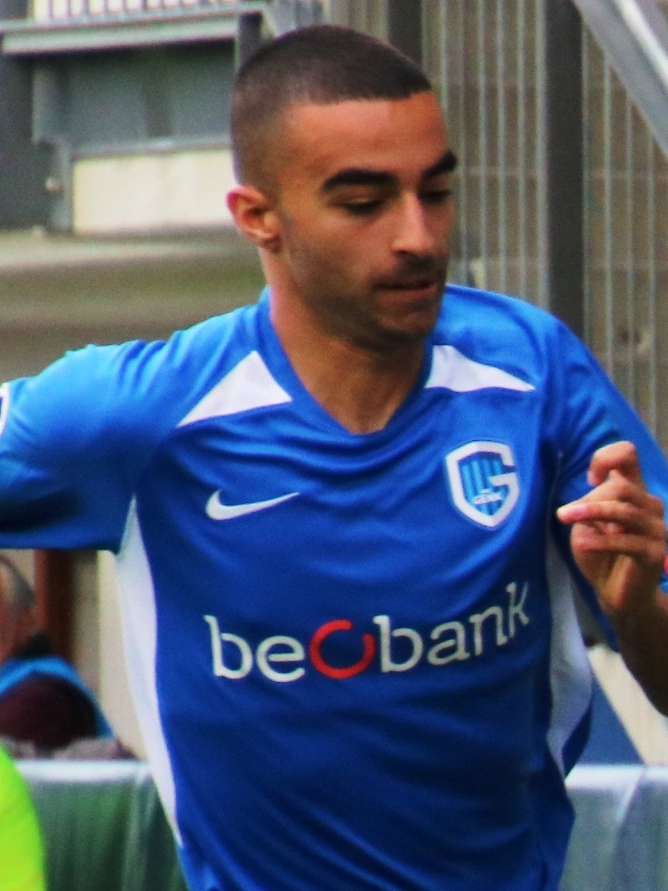
- Bahadır in 2019

Personal information
- Date of birth: 7 August 2002 (age 24)
- Place of birth: Liège, Belgium
- Height: 1.70 m (5 ft 7 in)
- Position: Right-back

Team information
- Current team: Ankara Keçiörengücü
- Number: 2

Youth career
- Standard Liège
- 2017–2019: Genk
- 2019–2021: Sporting Charleroi

Senior career*
Years	Team	Apps	(Gls)
2021–2022	Jong PSV	17	(0)
2022–2024	Alanyaspor	1	(0)
2024–2026	İstanbulspor	47	(1)
2026–	Ankara Keçiörengücü	4	(0)

International career
2017–2018	Belgium U16	9	(0)
2018–2019	Belgium U17	12	(1)
2020	Belgium U19	1	(0)
- * Club domestic league appearances and goals as of 30 October 2026

Yunus Bahadır (born 7 August 2002) is a Belgian professional footballer who plays as a right-back for Turkish TFF 1. Lig club Ankara Keçiörengücü.

== Club career ==
On 1 August 2022, Bahadır signed a three-year contract with Alanyaspor.

== International career ==
Bahadır was born in Belgium and is of Moroccan and Turkish descent. He is a former youth international for Belgium, having represented the Belgium U16s, U17s, and U19s. He was first called up to the Turkey U21s in May 2022 for a set of 2023 UEFA European Under-21 Championship qualification matches.
