= Phellipe Cardoso =

Brazilian professional footballer (born 2004)

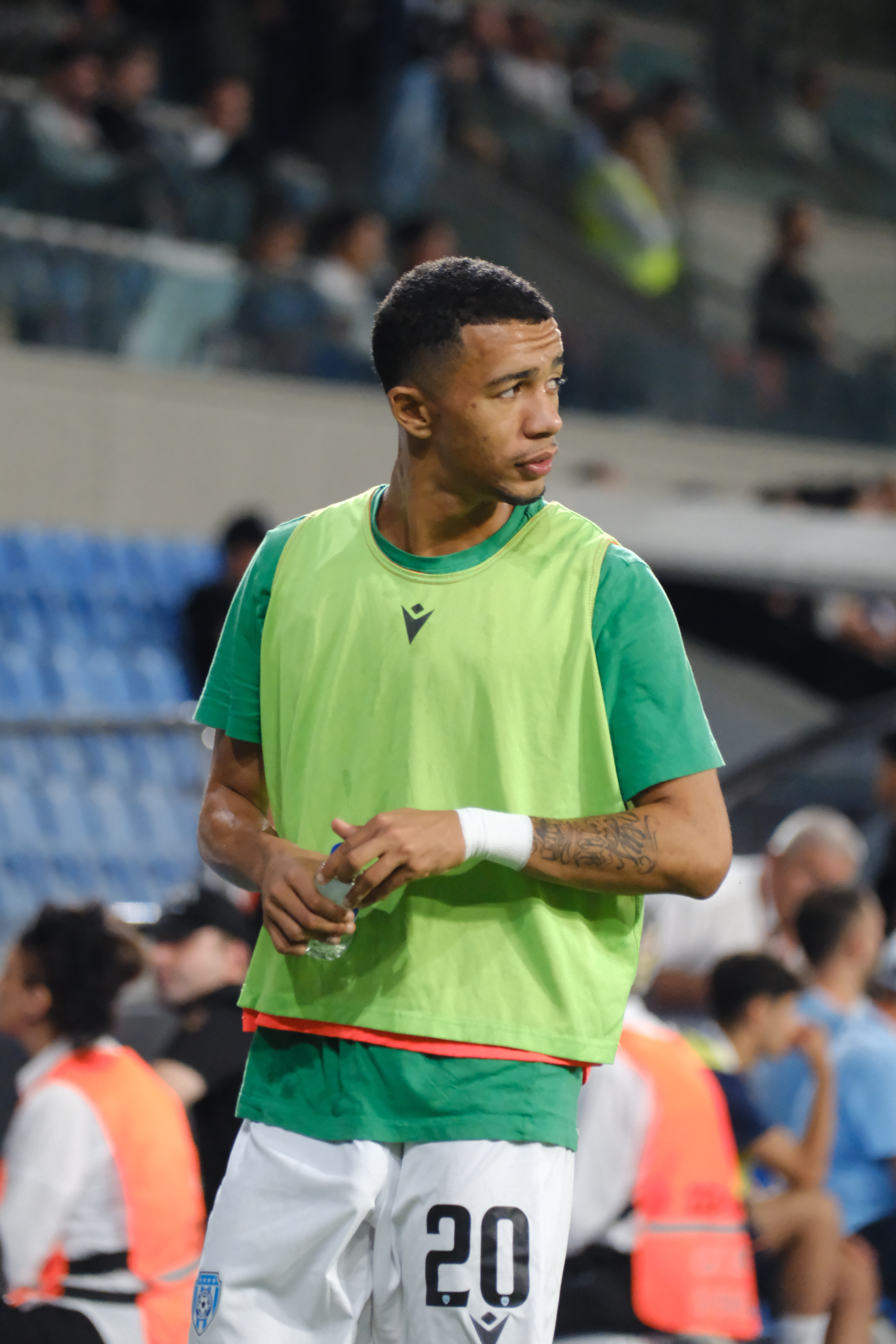

Personal information
- Full name: Phellipe Cardoso Araujo
- Date of birth: 23 May 2004 (age 22)
- Height: 1.78 m (5 ft 10 in)
- Positions: Left winger; attacking midfielder

Team information
- Current team: İstanbulspor
- Number: 7

Youth career
- 2024–2025: Ibrachina

Senior career*
Years	Team	Apps	(Gls)
2025–2026	Cherno More	11	(1)
2026–	İstanbulspor	21	(4)
- * Club domestic league appearances and goals as of 16 October 2026

Phellipe Cardoso Araujo (born 23 May 2004) is a Brazilian professional footballer who plays as a winger for TFF 1. Lig club İstanbulspor.

== Career ==
On 9 June 2025, Phellipe signed a contract with Bulgarian First League club Cherno More Varna, where he made 11 league appearances and scored one goal in the first half of 2025–26 season. He scored his first and only goal for the club in the Derby of Varna against Spartak Varna on 16 August 2025. On 30 January 2026, his contract with Cherno More was terminated by mutual consent.

On 6 February 2026, Phellipe signed for Turkish club İstanbulspor on a three-and-a-half-year contract.
