= Melih Bostan =

Turkish footballer (born 2004)

Personal information
- Date of birth: 8 April 2004 (age 22)
- Place of birth: İzmit, Turkey
- Height: 1.73 m (5 ft 8 in)
- Position: Striker

Team information
- Current team: Ümraniyespor (on loan from Konyaspor)
- Number: 9

Youth career
- 2013–2015: Derincespor
- 2015–2016: Derince Birlikspor
- 2016–2021: Fenerbahçe

Senior career*
| Years | Team | Apps | (Gls) |
| 2021–2023 | Fenerbahçe | 0 | (0) |
| 2021 | → Serik Belediyespor (loan) | 8 | (1) |
| 2023 | → Eskişehirspor (loan) | 11 | (2) |
| 2023–2024 | Gençlerbirliği | 15 | (6) |
| 2024–2026 | Konyaspor | 20 | (1) |
| 2026 | Sakaryaspor | 15 | (4) |
| 2026– | Konyaspor | 0 | (0) |
| 2026– | → Ümraniyespor (loan) | 9 | (1) |

International career^{‡}
| 2018 | Turkey U14 | 4 | (2) |
| 2018–2019 | Turkey U15 | 15 | (11) |
| 2019–2020 | Turkey U16 | 15 | (14) |
| 2021 | Turkey U18 | 3 | (0) |
| 2022 | Turkey U19 | 2 | (0) |
| 2025 | Turkey U20 | 2 | (0) |
| 2025– | Turkey U21 | 8 | (0) |
- * Club domestic league appearances and goals as of 18 October 2026 ‡ National team caps and goals as of 6 October 2026

Melih Bostan (born 8 April 2004) is a Turkish professional footballer who plays as a striker for TFF 1. Lig club Ümraniyespor on loan from Konyaspor

== Club career ==
A youth product of Derincespor and Derince Birlikspor, he was scouted by Fenerbahçe after scoring 123 from U12 to U15 level. He signed his first professional contract with Fenerbahçe on 1 October 2019 at the age of 15. On 29 January 2021, he joined Serik Belediyespor on a short-term loan in the TFF Second League for the second half of the 2020–21 season. On 17 March 2022, he signed a 5-year contract extension with Fenerbahçe. On 15 February 2023, he joined Eskişehirspor in the TFF Third League for the second half of the 2022–23 season. On 25 August 2023, he signed a professional contract with Gençlerbirliği on a 3+1 year contract in the TFF First League. On 26 July 2024, Bostan transferred to Konyaspor in the Süper Lig on a 3-year contract. That season he was the joint-top scorer for the 2024–25 Turkish Cup with 6 goals.

== International career ==
Bostan is a youth international for Turkey, having been called up to the Turkey U20s in March 2025.

== Honours ==
Individual

- 2024–25 Turkish Cup top scorer
