= Elvin Mendy =

Gambian footballer

Personal information
- Date of birth: 23 December 2006 (age 19)
- Place of birth: The Gambia
- Height: 1.82 m (6 ft 0 in)
- Position: Defensive midfielder

Team information
- Current team: İstanbulspor
- Number: 15

Youth career
- MMK Football Academy

Senior career*
Years	Team	Apps	(Gls)
2026–	İstanbulspor	6	(0)

International career^{‡}
2026–	Gambia	1	(0)
- * Club domestic league appearances and goals as of 13:43, 2 June 2026 (UTC) ‡ National team caps and goals as of 13:43, 2 June 2026 (UTC)

Elvin Mendy (born 23 December 2006) is a Gambian professional footballer who plays as a defensive midfielder for İstanbulspor in the TFF 1. Lig.

== Club career ==
Mendy joined İstanbulspor ahead of the 2025–26 season on 7 May 2026. making six appearances in the Turkish First League during his debut campaign. He debuted with İstanbulspor in a 3–2 win over Çorum on 13 February 2026.

== International career ==
Mendy represents the Gambia internationally. He was included in the Gambia senior squad and made his international debut in May 2026.
