= 1931–32 Istanbul Football League =

Istanbul Football League
- Season: 1931–32
- Champions: İstanbulspor (1st title)

The 1931–32 İstanbul Football League season was the 24th season of the league. İstanbulspor won the league for the first time. Galatasaray SK and Fenerbahçe SK did not join the league due to the disagreement regarding the match revenues. Beşiktaş JK also left the league after seven matches.

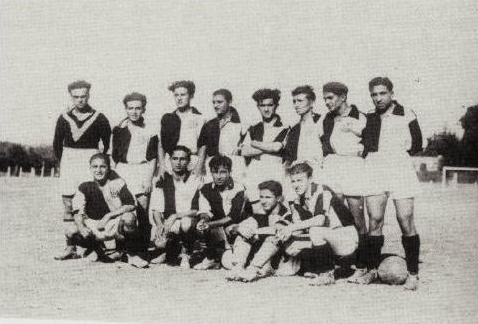
Istanbulspor 1931-32 Istanbul Football League Champion

== Season ==
Pos	Team	Pld	W	D	L	GF	GA	GD	Pts
1	İstanbulspor	10	7	0	3	31	15	+16	36 (Note: 12 bonus points?)
2	Küçükçekmece SK	10	6	1	3	18	10	+8	35 (Note: 12 bonus points?)
3	Vefa SK	10	5	1	4	23	24	−1	33 (Note: 12 bonus points?)
4	Beykoz 1908 S.K.D.	10	5	1	4	16	15	+1	33 (Note: 12 bonus points?)
5	Beşiktaş JK	10	4	1	5	28	20	+8	25
6	Üsküdar Anadolu SK	10	1	0	9	6	38	−32	24 (Note: 12 bonus points?)
