= Vefa Temel =

Turkish footballer (born 1998)

Personal information
- Date of birth: 3 November 2002 (age 24)
- Place of birth: Nantes, France
- Height: 1.76 m (5 ft 9 in)
- Position: Midfielder

Team information
- Current team: İstanbulspor
- Number: 8

Youth career
- Nantes
- 2018–2020: Bursaspor

Senior career*
Years	Team	Apps	(Gls)
2020–2022	Bursaspor	16	(0)
2022–	İstanbulspor	53	(5)
2025	→ Bursaspor (loan)	9	(1)

International career^{‡}
2019	Turkey U18	4	(1)
2024	Turkey U21	1	(0)
- * Club domestic league appearances and goals as of 6 May 2026 ‡ National team caps and goals as of 22 March 2024

Vefa Temel (born 3 November 2002) is a professional footballer who plays as a midfielder for TFF 1. Lig club İstanbulspor. Born in France, Temel was a youth international for Turkey.

== Career ==
Temel is a youth product of the French club Nantes, before moving to Turkey with Bursaspor's youth academy in 2018. On 14 September 2020 he signed his first professional contract with Bursaspor until 2023. On 30 May 2022, he terminated his contract with Bursaspor. He controversially signed with Giresunspor in June 2022 for 5 years, but Bursaspor sued the club and the transfer certificate was not issued. Instead, Temel signed a 5-year contract with İstanbulspor on 15 September 2022. On 10 November 2022, he made his first professional appearance in a 3–2 Turkish Cup win over Etimesgut Belediyespor.

== International career ==
Temel is of Turkish descent. He represented the Turkey under-19s in 2019.
