= Erdem Onur Beytaş =

Turkish footballer

Personal information
- Date of birth: 30 April 1998 (age 28)
- Place of birth: Melikgazi, Turkey
- Height: 1.80 m (5 ft 11 in)
- Position: Midfielder

Team information
- Current team: Ankaraspor
- Number: 17

Youth career
- 2010–2017: Kayserispor

Senior career*
Years	Team	Apps	(Gls)
2017–2018	Kayserispor	2	(0)
2017	→ Darıca Gençlerbirliği (loan)	0	(0)
2018–2019	Erzin Belediyespor	27	(9)
2019–2022	Ankara Keçiörengücü	6	(0)
2020	→ 24 Erzincanspor (loan)	4	(0)
2020–2021	→ Belediye Kütahyaspor (loan)	27	(11)
2022	→ Iğdır (loan)	9	(2)
2022–2025	Yeni Mersin İdmanyurdu	63	(17)
2024–2025	Çorluspor	29	(9)
2025–2026	Orduspor	21	(3)
2026–	Ankaraspor	4	(0)
- * Club domestic league appearances and goals as of 1 October 2026

Erdem Onur Beytaş (born 30 April 1998) is a Turkish footballer who plays as a midfielder for Ankaraspor.

== Club career ==
Erdem Onur made his professional debut with Kayserispor in a 5-0 loss to İstanbul Başakşehir on 14 January 2017.
