= Kubilay Sönmez =

German-born Turkish footballer

Personal information
- Date of birth: 17 June 1994 (age 32)
- Place of birth: Kamen, Germany
- Height: 1.83 m (6 ft 0 in)
- Position: Midfielder

Team information
- Current team: İstanbulspor
- Number: 12

Youth career
- 2009–2010: Wattenscheid
- 2010–2011: Rot-Weiss Essen
- 2011–2013: Schalke 04

Senior career*
Years	Team	Apps	(Gls)
2013–2014	Dardanelspor	14	(0)
2014–2016	Şanlıurfaspor	47	(0)
2016–2017	Kayserispor	18	(0)
2017–2018	BB Erzurumspor	6	(0)
2018	Adana Demirspor	15	(0)
2018–2020	Hatayspor	64	(0)
2020–2021	Göztepe	19	(0)
2021–2023	Bursaspor	45	(2)
2023–2024	Boluspor	25	(0)
2024–2025	İstanbulspor	24	(2)
2025–2026	Kahramanmaraş İstiklalspor	7	(1)
2026	Manisa	10	(0)
2026–	İstanbulspor	7	(0)

International career
2014	Turkey U20	3	(0)
2014–2015	Turkey U21	2	(0)
- * Club domestic league appearances and goals as of 24 October 2026

Kubilay Sönmez (born 17 June 1994) is a professional footballer who plays as a midfielder for TFF 1. Lig club İstanbulspor. Born in Germany, he represents Turkey internationally.

== International career ==
Sönmez was born in Germany to parents of Turkish descent. He represents the Turkish Football Federation, and has represented the Turkish U20 and U21 national teams.

== Career statistics ==
=== Club ===
As of match played 16 May 2024

Appearances and goals by club, season and competition
Club	Season	League			National cup		Total	
Club	Season	Division	Apps	Goals	Apps	Goals	Apps	Goals
Schalke 04 II	2013-14	Regionalliga	0	0	—		0	0
Dardanelspor	2013-14	TFF Second League	14	0	1	0	15	0
Şanlıurfaspor	2014-15	TFF First League	29	0	1	0	30	0
Şanlıurfaspor	2015-16	TFF First League	18	0	5	0	23	0
Şanlıurfaspor	Total		47	0	6	0	53	0
Kayserispor	2016-17	Süper Lig	18	0	8	0	26	0
BB Erzurumspor	2017-18	TFF First League	6	0	3	0	9	0
Adana Demirspor	2017-18	TFF First League	15	0	0	0	15	0
Hatayspor	2018-19	TFF First League	34	0	3	0	37	0
Hatayspor	2019-20	TFF First League	30	0	0	0	30	0
Hatayspor	Total		64	0	3	0	67	0
Göztepe	2020-21	Süper Lig	19	0	2	0	21	0
Göztepe	2021-22	Süper Lig	0	0	0	0	0	0
Göztepe	Total		19	0	2	0	21	0
Bursaspor	2021-22	TFF First League	14	0	1	0	15	0
Bursaspor	2022-23	TFF Second League	31	2	0	0		
Bursaspor	Total		45	2	1	0	46	2
Boluspor	2023-24	TFF First League	25	0	3	1	28	1
Career total			253	2	27	1	280	3
