= Fatih Tultak =

Turkish footballer

Personal information
- Full name: Fatih Tultak
- Date of birth: 28 February 2001 (age 25)
- Place of birth: Tarsus, Turkey
- Height: 1.86 m (6 ft 1 in)
- Position: Centre-back

Team information
- Current team: İstanbulspor
- Number: 13

Youth career
- 2012–2017: Tarsus İdman Yurdu
- 2017–2018: Kardemir Karabükspor

Senior career*
Years	Team	Apps	(Gls)
2018–2020	Kardemir Karabükspor	39	(0)
2020–2021	Ankaragücü	1	(0)
2020–2021	→ Sakaryaspor (loan)	5	(0)
2021–	İstanbulspor	46	(2)
2022	→ Pazarspor (loan)	2	(0)
2022–2023	→ Nazilli Belediyespor (loan)	3	(0)
2023	→ Ergene Velimeşe (loan)	12	(0)
2023–2024	→ Karacabey Belediyespor (loan)	27	(0)

International career
2018–2019	Turkey U18	12	(0)
2019–2020	Turkey U19	5	(0)
- * Club domestic league appearances and goals as of 6 May 2026

Fatih Tultak (born 28 February 2001) is a Turkish professional footballer who plays as a centre-back for TFF 1. Lig club İstanbulspor.

== Career ==
On 31 January 2020, Tultak transferred to Ankaragücü from Kardemir Karabükspor. Tultak made his debut with Ankaragücü in a 1-0 Süper Lig win over Denizlispor on 25 June 2020.

On 13 November 2025, Tultak was banned from playing for 45 days for his involvement in the 2025 Turkish football betting scandal.
