= Kerem Şen =

Turkish footballer (born 2002)

Personal information
- Date of birth: 14 June 2002 (age 24)
- Place of birth: Osmangazi, Türkiye
- Height: 1.77 m (5 ft 10 in)
- Position: Midfielder

Team information
- Current team: Ümraniyespor
- Number: 16

Youth career
- 2013–2014: Galatasaray
- 2014–2015: Bursaspor
- 2015–2016: Yeşil Bursa
- 2016–2020: Bursaspor

Senior career*
Years	Team	Apps	(Gls)
2020–2022	Bursaspor	27	(3)
2022–2025	Trabzonspor	7	(0)
2023	→ İstanbulspor (loan)	7	(1)
2024–2025	→ İstanbulspor (loan)	27	(1)
2025–2026	Serikspor	16	(0)
2026	Sakaryaspor	12	(0)
2026–	Ümraniyespor	8	(0)
- * Club domestic league appearances and goals as of 8 November 2026

Kerem Şen (born 14 June 2002) is a Turkish professional footballer who plays as a midfielder for TFF 1. Lig club Ümraniyespor.

== Career ==
Şen is a youth product of the Turkish clubs Galatasaray, Bursaspor and Yeşil Bursa. On 4 August 2020, he signed his first professional contract with Bursaspor and was promoted to their senior team in the TFF First League. On 26 January 2022, he transferred to the Süper Lig club Trabzonspor on a contract until the summer of 2026. On 3 February 2023, he joined İstanbulspor on loan for the second half of the 2022–23 season. After 7 appearances and 1 goal with İstanbulspor, he returned to Trabzonspor for the following 2023–24 season.

In February 2026, Şen joined Sakaryaspor.

== International career ==
In September 2019, Şen was called up to a training camp for the Turkey U19s.
