= Ahmet Bahçıvan =

Turkish footballer

Personal information
- Date of birth: 27 February 1996 (age 30)
- Place of birth: Altındağ, Turkey
- Height: 1.87 m (6 ft 2 in)
- Position: Midfielder

Team information
- Current team: Isparta 32 SK
- Number: 26

Youth career
- 2009–2012: Bozüyükspor

Senior career*
Years	Team	Apps	(Gls)
2012–2013	Bozüyükspor	4	(0)
2013–2021	Adanaspor	31	(0)
2014	→ Amed SK (loan)	0	(0)
2018–2019	→ Kastamonuspor 1966 (loan)	9	(0)
2019–2020	→ Karacabey Belediyespor (loan)	13	(1)
2020–2021	→ Serik Belediyespor (loan)	18	(1)
2021–2022	Bayrampaşa	21	(6)
2023–	Isparta 32 SK	0	(0)

International career
2017	Turkey U21	2	(0)
- * Club domestic league appearances and goals as of 1 October 2023

Ahmet Bahçıvan (born 27 February 1996) is a Turkish footballer who plays as a midfielder for TFF Second League club Isparta 32 SK.

== Career ==
A youth product of Bozüyükspor, Bahçıvan began his senior career with the club in 2012. He transferred to Adanaspor in 2013, signing a professional contract with them. He helped them win the 2015-16 TFF First League and achieving promotion. He made his professional debut with Adanaspor in a 1–0 Süper Lig loss to Konyaspor on 2 October 2016. He spent most of his early career on loan in the lower leagues of Turkey with Amed SK, Kastamonuspor 1966, Karacabey Belediyespor, and Serik Belediyespor. On 13 August 2021, he transferred to the TFF Third League club Bayrampaşa.

== International career ==
Bahçıvan represented the Turkey U21s for a pair of friendlies in 2017.
