= Kırıkkale F.K. =

Turkish football club

Kırıkkale FK
- Full name: Kırıkkale Futbol Kulübü
- Founded: 1995
- Ground: Başpınar Stadium, Kırıkkale
- Capacity: 15,450
- Chairman: Abdülkadir Yahşi
- Manager: Nihat Baran
- League: TFF 3. Lig
- 2025–26: TFF 3. Lig, Group 2, 10th of 16
Home colours	Away colours

Kırıkkale FK is a Turkish football club located in Kırıkkale, Turkey.

== History ==
The club was founded under the name Türk Metal Gençlikspor in 1995 by the Türk Metal Sendikası, a Turkish metal-worker union. An amateur club for their early existence, they were promoted into the Turkish Regional Amateur League in 2011. The club again changed their name to 'Türk Metal Kırıkkalespor in June 2015. They won the 2015-16 Turkish Regional Amateur League, and were promoted into the TFF Third League for the first time.

== Colours and badge ==
The club colours are blue and red.

== Current squad ==
As of 20 November 2021

Note: Flags indicate national team as defined under FIFA eligibility rules; some limited exceptions apply. Players may hold more than one non-FIFA nationality.

No.	Pos.	Nation	Player
—	GK	TUR	Yunus Emre Kar
—	GK	TUR	Barbaros Şimşek
—	GK	TUR	Gökdeniz Yılmaz
—	GK	TUR	İlker Günay
—	DF	TUR	Fatih Uludağ
—	DF	TUR	Seyit Mehmet Söğüt
—	DF	TUR	Batuhan Kazancı
—	DF	TUR	Yunus Emre Çabuker
—	DF	TUR	Doğukan Subaşı
—	DF	TUR	Yiğit Alp Sevinç
—	DF	TUR	İbrahim Turan
—	DF	TUR	Mehmet Albayrak
—	MF	TUR	Berkay Emre Sarısu

No.	Pos.	Nation	Player
—	MF	TUR	Eyüp Can Temiz
—	MF	TUR	Buğra Şahiner
—	MF	TUR	Ali Kemal Özkan
—	MF	TUR	Serkan Güler
—	MF	TUR	Emrah Sürücü
—	MF	TUR	Reşit Akbulut
—	MF	TUR	Onur Çakmakcı
—	MF	TUR	Osman Emirkan Demir
—	MF	TUR	Uğur Ayhan
—	MF	TUR	Yasin Reis
—	FW	TUR	Furkan Külekçi
—	FW	TUR	Ensar Eyüp Bayır

== Honours ==
- Turkish Regional Amateur League: 2015-16
