= İstanbulspor =

Association football club

- Full name: İstanbulspor Kulübü A.Ş.
- Nicknames: Boğalar (Bulls); İstanbul'un Takımı (Istanbul's Team); Halkın Takımı (People's Team)
- Founded: 4 January 1926; 100 years ago
- Ground: Necmi Kadıoğlu Stadium, Istanbul, Turkey
- Capacity: 4,274
- Coordinates: 41°01′28″N 28°41′52″E
- Chairman: Ecmel Faik Sarıalioğlu
- Head coach: Özer Hurmacı
- League: TFF 1. Lig
- 2025–26: TFF 1. Lig, 11th of 20
- Website: www.istanbulspor.com.tr
Home colours	Away colours	Third colours

İstanbulspor Kulübü is a Turkish football and sports club founded by Istanbul High School students in 1926. In 2004–05, they were relegated from the Turkish Süper Lig (Super League) to the TFF First League. For many decades, it was the fourth most famous and well-developed professional football club in Istanbul, coming after Beşiktaş, Galatasaray, and Fenerbahçe. After being bought by the Uzan family in 1990, it has been repossessed by the government and resold to third parties.

Their greatest success is the Turkish championship title won in 1932.

== History ==
İstanbulspor was founded by Kemal Halim Gürgen, also known by his native Albanian name of Qemal Omari and Istanbul Boys High School students. It was founded on 4 January 1926, being one of the first sports clubs of the Turkish Republican period. In the 1931–32 season, İstanbulspor won both the Istanbul League and Turkish Football Championship.

A newspaper headline about the return of Turkish champions Istanbulspor to Istanbul on 22 October 1932

Until 1990, the club was managed by the Istanbul High School foundation. During this period, İstanbulspor has been relegated from and promoted to the top division several times. Also, it relegated to the amateur level in 1979 and played at the amateur level for two seasons. In 1984, club was relegated to third league. In 1990, Uzan Holding, led by Turkish businessman Cem Uzan, bought the club and converted it into İstanbulspor A.Ş., İstanbulspor incorporation. After that, Istanbulspor was funded by Uzan family and promoted back to first league in 1995. Istanbulspor became one of the most successful Turkish football clubs again, as they reached fourth place in the 1997–98 season and played in the UEFA Cup. Uzan family withdrew its support from İstanbulspor in 2001. Because of this, İstanbulspor fell into financial crisis and came ninth in the 2002–03 season.

Eventually, in 2003, the Turkish government took over the financially collapsed club. However, Istanbulspor were relegated to the second league in 2004–05. In 2006, İstanbulspor were resold by the government to former Turkish player Saffet Sancaklı's Marmara Spor Faaliyetleri San. ve Tic. A.Ş. for $3,250,000. In 2007, Ömer Sarıalioğlu, a Turkish businessman, bought the club from Saffet Sancaklı. İstanbulspor tried to avoid relegation at the last two seasons. İstanbulspor escaped from relegation in the 2008–09 season after finishing sixth in the Third Group. However, İstanbulspor finished the second group of the 2nd League next season as second from last and were finally relegated to the Third League, which is the fourth level of the Turkish football system. They played in the promotion play-offs in the 2012–13 and 2013–14 seasons but failed to achieve success. İstanbulspor finally promoted to the Second League after defeating Zonguldak Kömürspor and Çorum Belediyespor successively in promotion play-offs in the 2014–15 season.

== Colours and crest ==
The colours of İstanbulspor are yellow and black, which are the colours of Istanbul High School. Also, white is accepted as a third colour, but this is not official. Having represented Turkey in an international competition, İstanbulspor was granted the privilege to use the Turkish flag in its emblem, located on the top left corner. The emblem of Istanbul High School is in the middle.

== League participations ==
- Süper Lig (25): 1959–67, 1968–72, 1995–2005, 2022–24
- TFF First League (18): 1967–68, 1972–75, 1981–84, 1992–95, 2005–08, 2017–2022, 2024-
- TFF Second League (16): 1975–79, 1984–92, 2008–10, 2015–17
- TFF Third League (5): 2010–15
- Turkish Regional Amateur League (35): 1926–59, 1979–81

== European history ==
As of 27 August 1998

Competition	Pld	W	D	L	GF	GA	GD
UEFA Cup	2	1	0	1	4	4	0
UEFA Intertoto Cup	6	4	1	1	12	6	+6
Total	8	5	1	2	16	10	+6

UEFA Cup:

Season	Round	Club	Home	Away	Aggregate
1998–99	Q2	(Romania) Argeș Pitești	4–2	0–2	4–4 (a)

UEFA Intertoto Cup:

Season	Round	Club	Home	Away	Aggregate
1997	Group Stage	(Hungary) Vasas	2–0	—N/a	1st
1997	Group Stage	(Germany) Werder Bremen	—N/a	0–0	1st
1997	Group Stage	(Sweden) Öster	3–2	—N/a	1st
1997	Group Stage	(Latvia) Universitāte Rīga	—N/a	5–1	1st
1997	Semi-final	(France) Lyon	2–1	0–2	2–3

== Honours ==
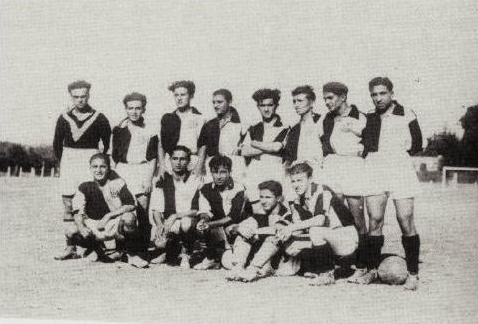
1931–32 Istanbul Football League champions

=== European competitions ===
- UEFA Intertoto Cup
  - Semi-finals (1): 1997

=== Domestic competitions ===
- Turkish Football Championship
  - Winners (1): 1932
- TFF First League
  - Winners (1): 1967–68
  - Runners-up (1): 1994–95
- TFF Second League
  - Winners (2): 1991–92, 2016–17
- TFF Third League
  - Winners (1): 2014–15

=== Regional competitions ===
- Istanbul Football League
  - Winners (1): 1931–32
- Istanbul Shield
  - Winners (1): 1931–32
- Istanbul 2. Football League
  - Winners (1): 1926–27

=== Others ===
- Spor Toto Cup
  - Winners (1): 1970–71
- TSYD Cup
  - Winners (2): 1996, 2000

== Kit manufacturers and shirt sponsors ==
Period	Kit manufacturer	Shirt sponsor	Ref
1924-77	-	-	
1977-78	-	Pereja	
1978-81	-	-	
1981-82	-	Arko	
1982-83	-	Dokusan	
1983-84	-	-	
1984-85	-	Kazal	
1985-88	-	-	
1988-91	-	Emlak Bankası	
1991-92	Adidas	Conti/Rowenta	
1992-93	-		
1993-94	Diadora	Seat	
1994-95	Adidas	-	
1995-96	Umbro	Lee	
1996-2000	Umbro	Telsim	
2000-01	Umbro		
2001-02	Umbro	Netbul	
2002-03	Umbro	Netbul	
2003-04	Umbro	-	
2004-05	Le Coq Sportif	Turkcell	
2023-24	Raru SPQOR	Turkcell	

== Club officials ==
Position	Name
Manager	Osman Zeki Korkmaz
Assistant Manager	Vural Önen
Goalkeeper Coach	Senih Yaban
Goalkeeper Coach	Yasin Çalışkan
Match Analyst	Eyüp Genç
Physiotherapist	İlhan Kafkas; Altay Çetinkaya
Massur	Adnan Beyoğlu; Recep Karaman
Nutritionist	Fatih Akdağ
Outfitter	Şenol Taşdemir; Cihat Özdemir
Interpreter	Erol Kurt
General Manager	Gökhan Kaplan

== Players ==
=== Current squad ===
As of 23 September 2026

Note: Flags indicate national team as defined under FIFA eligibility rules; some limited exceptions apply. Players may hold more than one non-FIFA nationality.

No.	Pos.	Nation	Player
1	GK	TUR	İsa Doğan
2	DF	ENG	Demeaco Duhaney
3	DF	TUR	Yusuf Özer
4	DF	TUR	Duran Şahin
5	DF	NGR	Michael Ologo
6	MF	AUT	Isa Dayakli
7	MF	BRA	Phellipe
8	MF	TUR	Vefa Temel
9	FW	TUR	Mustafa Sol
10	MF	BUL	Ilian Iliev Jr.
11	MF	TUR	Berk Nizam
12	MF	TUR	Kubilay Sönmez
13	DF	TUR	Fatih Tultak
15	MF	GAM	Elvin Mendy
16	MF	GHA	Saviour Kagbetor
17	FW	GAM	Essap Njie
18	DF	TUR	Deniz Tuncer
20	DF	TUR	Özcan Şahan
21	MF	TUR	Abdullah Dıjlan Aydın
23	MF	TUR	Furkan Çiftçi

No.	Pos.	Nation	Player
25	DF	TUR	Batuhan Yavuz
26	GK	TUR	Mücahit Serbest
27	MF	SEN	Mamadou Fall
28	GK	TUR	Alp Tutar
29	MF	GAM	Yorro Savage
30	FW	GAM	Alieu Cham
31	FW	TUR	Ertuğrul Sandıkcı
34	MF	TUR	Aytaç Kara
37	DF	TUR	Umut İslamoğlu
42	FW	TUR	Soner Salih Yavuz
44	MF	TUR	Erdem Seçgin
52	MF	TUR	Ömer Faruk Duymaz
54	FW	TUR	Ünal Durmuşhan
58	DF	TUR	Muhlis Dağaşan
61	MF	TUR	Enver Sarıalioğlu
77	FW	MKD	Mario Krstovski
81	FW	TUR	Ali Akman
89	DF	TUR	Emrecan Uzunhan
—	DF	TUR	İzzet Erdal
—	DF	TUR	Yakuphan Sarıalioğlu

=== Out on loan ===
Note: Flags indicate national team as defined under FIFA eligibility rules; some limited exceptions apply. Players may hold more than one non-FIFA nationality.

No.	Pos.	Nation	Player
—	DF	TUR	Demir Mermerci (at Galata SK until 30 June 2027)
—	MF	TUR	Tunahan Şamdanlı (at Kırıkkale until 30 June 2027)
—	FW	TUR	Abdurrahman Emek (at Büyükçekmecegücü FK until 30 June 2027)

No.	Pos.	Nation	Player
—	FW	TUR	Eren Arda Şan (at Karşıyaka until 30 June 2027)
—	FW	TUR	Yasin Polat (at Kırıkkale until 30 June 2027)
—	FW	TUR	Yusuf Tunç (at Kırıkkale until 30 June 2027)

=== Retired numbers ===
No.	Player	Nationality	Position	İstanbulspor debut	Last match	Ref
22	Zeki Çelik	Turkey	Right back	3 September 2016	4 May 2018	

== Notable players ==
=== Europe ===
==== Albania ====
- (Albania) Kristal Abazaj
- (Albania) Sindrit Guri

==== Bosnia and Herzegovina ====
- (Bosnia and Herzegovina) Aldin Čajić
- (Bosnia and Herzegovina) Fahrudin Omerović
- (Bosnia and Herzegovina) Elvir Bolić
- (Bosnia and Herzegovina) Elvir Baljić
- (Bosnia and Herzegovina) Hadis Zubanović
- (Bosnia and Herzegovina) Enes Demirović

==== Bulgaria ====
- (Bulgaria) Ivaylo Petkov
- (Bulgaria) Zdravko Zdravkov

==== France ====
- (France) Jean-Michel Ferri

==== Kosovo ====
- (Kosovo) Florian Loshaj
- (Kosovo) Jetmir Topalli
- (Kosovo) Valmir Veliu

==== Lithuania ====
- (Lithuania) Modestas Vorobjovas

==== Netherlands ====
- (Netherlands) John van den Brom
- (Netherlands) Peter van Vossen

==== North Macedonia ====
- (North Macedonia) Valon Ethemi

==== Russia ====
- (Russia) Oleg Salenko

==== Slovakia ====
- (Slovakia) Marián Zeman

==== Turkey ====
- (Turkey) Zeki Çelik
- (Turkey) Volkan Babacan
- (Turkey) Ümit Davala
- (Turkey) Turhan Akra
- (Turkey) Sergen Yalçın
- (Turkey) Tanju Çolak
- (Turkey) Aykut Kocaman
- (Turkey) Oğuz Çetin

=== Asia ===
==== Iran ====
- (Iran) Allahyar Sayyadmanesh

=== Africa ===
==== Gabon ====
- (Gabon) David Sambissa

==== Ivory Coast ====
- (Ivory Coast) Simon Deli

==== Senegal ====
- (Senegal) Racine Coly
- (Senegal) Alassane Ndao

== List of presidents ==
As of 6 June 2019

- 1925–1935: Kemal Halim Gürgen
- 1935–1941: Fethi Tanalay
- 1941–1946: Murat Çelikel
- 1946–1968: Ali Sohtorik
- 1968–1970: Talha Dinçel
- 1970–1972: Nirun Şahingiray
- 1972–1973: Hayri Aydıner
- 1973–1977: Hüseyin Taşdelenler
- 1977–1978: Ural Aydıner
- 1978–1980: Orhan Togar
- 1980–1981: Dursun Öztürk
- 1981–1984: Fethi Erhan
- 1984–1987: Muhsin Sarıcı
- 1987–1988: Mehmet Yıldırım
- 1988–1992: Aziz Alturfan
- 1992–1998: Cem Uzan
- 1998–2002: Tayfun Gündoğar
- 2002–2004: Adnan Sezgin
- 2004–2006: Mehmet Akif Yaşin
- 2006–2008: Saffet Sancaklı
- 2008–2015: Ömer Sarıalioğlu
- 2015–present: Ecmel Faik Sarıalioğlu
