= 2022–23 Turkish Cup =

Ziraat Turkish Cup
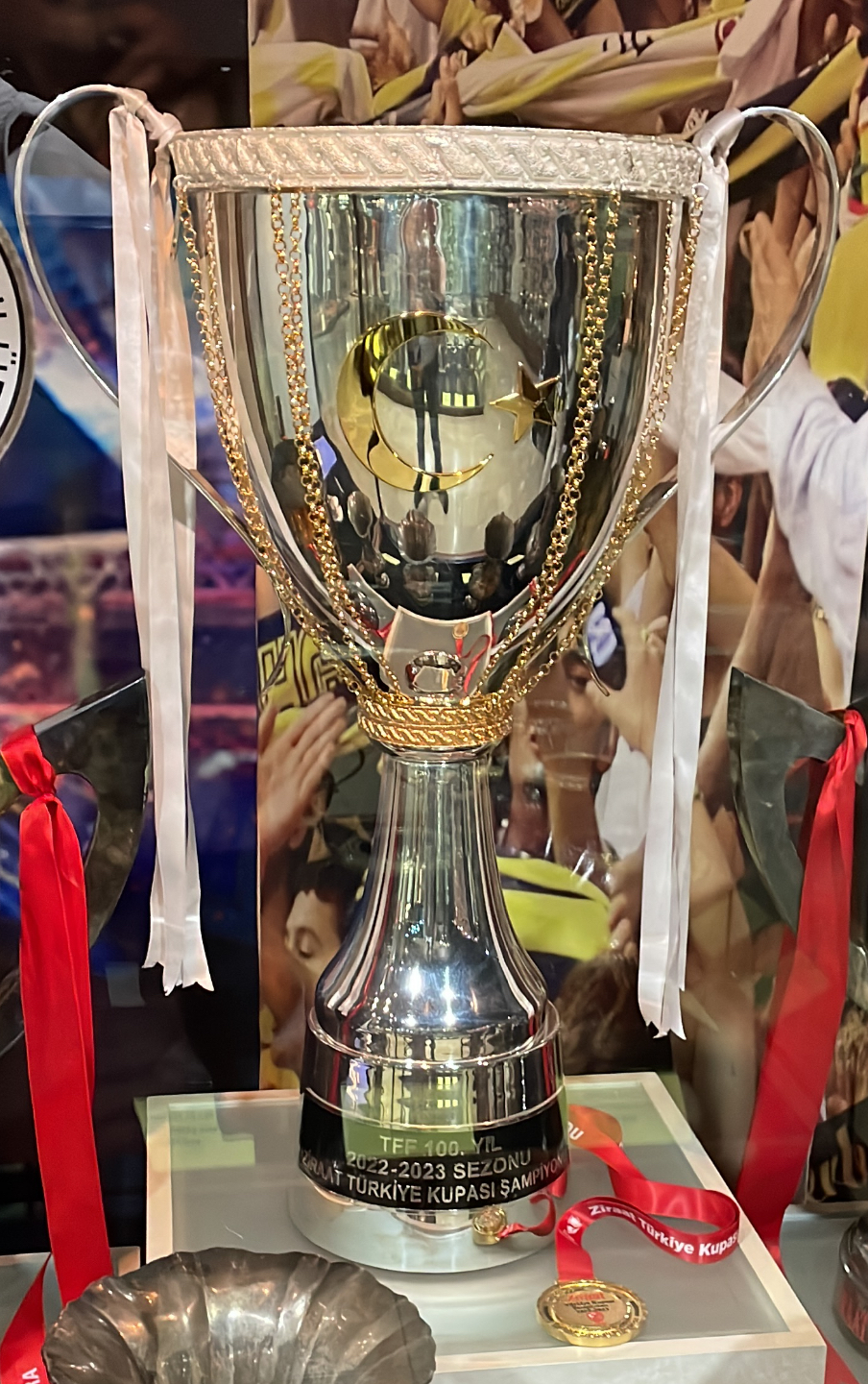
- Centennial version of the trophy won by Fenerbahçe

Tournament details
- Country: Turkey
- Dates: 13 September 2022 – 11 June 2023
- Teams: 148

Final positions
- Champions: Fenerbahçe (7th title)
- Runners-up: İstanbul Başakşehir

The 2022–23 Turkish Cup (Turkish: Türkiye Kupası) was the 61st season of the tournament. Ziraat Bank was the sponsor of the tournament, thus the sponsored name was Ziraat Turkish Cup. The winners earned a berth in the second qualifying round of the 2023–24 UEFA Europa Conference League, and also qualified for the 2023 Turkish Super Cup.

== Competition format ==
Round	Dates	Total Clubs Remaining	Clubs Involved	Winners from Previous Round	New Entries at This Round	Leagues Entering at This Round	Notes
First round	13–15 September 2022	148	52	0	52	18 amateur teams from 18 provinces that do not have a professional team in 2022–23 season; 7 teams relegated from 2021 to 2022 2nd League; 27 teams ranked 6th to 15th in 2021–22 3rd League groups	single leg
Second round	27–29 September 2022	122	58	26	32	4 teams relegated from 2021 to 2022 1st League; 18 teams ranked 8th to 19th in 2021–22 2nd League and not relegated; 1 team ranked 6th with the best points average in 2021–22 3rd League groups; 9 teams promoted from 2021 to 2022 Regional Amateur League	single leg; seeding applied; seeded team play at home
Third round	18–20 October 2022	93	68	29	39	9 teams eliminated from 2021 to 2022 3rd League play-offs; 4 teams ranked 6th and 7th in 2021–22 2nd League groups; 6 teams promoted from 2021 to 2022 3rd League; 9 teams ranked 7th to 15th in 2021–22 1st League; 4 teams relegated from 2021 to 2022 Super League; 7 teams ranked 9th to 16th in 2021–22 Super League (except Sivasspor)	single leg; seeding applied; seeded team play at home
Fourth round	8–10 November 2022	59	54	34	20	7 teams eliminated from 2021 to 2022 2nd League play-offs; 3 teams promoted from 2021 to 2022 2nd League; 3 teams eliminated from 2021 to 2022 1st League play-offs; 3 teams promoted from 2021 to 2022 1st League; 4 teams ranked 5th to 8th in 2021–22 Super League	single leg; seeding applied; seeded team play at home
Fifth round	20–22 December 2022	32	32	27	5	2021–22 Turkish Cup winner Sivasspor; 4 teams ranked 1st to 4th in 2021–22 Super League	single leg; seeding applied; seeded team play at home
Round of 16	17–19 January 2023	16	16	16	0		single leg; seeding applied
Quarter-finals	4–6 April 2023	8	8	8	0		single leg; seeding applied
Semi-finals	1st Leg: 3–4 May 2023 2nd Leg: 24–25 May 2023	4	4	4	0		two legs; no away goal rule
Final	11 June 2023	2	2	2	0		single leg

== First round ==
34 Third League and 18 Regional Amateur League teams competed in this round. No seeds were applied in the single-leg round. The draw was made on 5 September 2022. The match schedules were announced on 6 September 2022. 15 seeded and 12 unseeded teams qualified for the next round. Biggest upset was Bigaspor (140) eliminating Akhisarspor (78). Lowest-ranked team qualified for the next round was Boyabat 1868 Spor (144). Highest-ranked team eliminated was Akhisarspor (78).

13 September 2022	Serhat Ardahan	2 – 4	Kars 36 Spor	-
13:00	Altınay 42'; Taş 83' (pen.)		Akın 9'; Bayram 19'; Dağabakan 33', 45+4'	Stadium: -

13 September 2022	Beyoğlu Yeniçarşıspor	2 – 2 (a.e.t.) (3-5 p)	Ergene Velimeşe	-
15:30	Çelikel 55'; Kılıç 90+4'		Dilek 44'; Günhan 69'	Stadium: -
	Penalties
	Bölükbaşı (penalty scored); Kılıç (penalty scored); Güler (penalty scored); Gelmen (penalty missed)		(penalty scored) Halvaci; (penalty scored) Barlık; (penalty scored) Hırçın; (penalty scored) Bölük; (penalty scored) Öksüz

13 September 2022	Bilecik 1969	0 – 0 (a.e.t.) (1-4 p)	Yalovaspor	-
15:30				Stadium: -

13 September 2022	Bigaspor	1 – 0	Akhisarspor	-
15:45	Akar 29'			Stadium: -

13 September 2022	Karabük İdmanyurdu Spor	0 – 0 (a.e.t.) (1-4 p)	Bartınspor	-
19:00				Stadium: -
	Penalties
	Pamukçu (penalty scored); Tunç (penalty missed); Demir (penalty missed)		(penalty scored) Türker; (penalty scored) Akdeniz; (penalty scored) Amasyalı; (penalty scored) Atakulu

14 September 2022	Karaköprü Belediyespor	w/o	Cizre Serhatspor	-
14:30				Stadium: -

14 September 2022	Kilis Belediyespor	0 – 0 (a.e.t.) (4-3 p)	Osmaniyespor FK	-
14:30				Stadium: -

14 September 2022	Elazığ Karakoçan FK	1 – 0	Elazığspor	-
14:30	Eser 39'			Stadium: -

14 September 2022	Erbaaspor	0 – 1	Gümüşhanespor	-
14:30			Koca 69'	Stadium: -

14 September 2022	12 Bingölspor	1 – 10	Ağrı 1970 Spor	-
14:30	Aleci 63'		Torun 13', 35', 41'; Seres 21', 56'; Yavaş 31'; Sevinç 33'; Baş 49'; Kutlu 60', 66'	Stadium: -

14 September 2022	Fatsa Belediyespor	0 –1	Yomraspor	-
14:30			Aparı 9'	Stadium: -

14 September 2022	1954 Kelkit Bld.Spor	3 – 0	Dersimspor	-
14:30	Fidan 19'; Yıldız 20'; Atay 90+1'			Stadium: -

14 September 2022	Siirt İl Özel İdare	2 – 0	Yüksekova Belediyespor	-
14:30	Turan 70' (pen.); Gözel 80'			Stadium: -

14 September 2022	Hacettepe 1945	3 – 0	Kırıkkale Büyük Anadoluspor	-
15:00	Demir 48'; Fındıkcı 87'; Çölbekler 90+4'			Stadium: -

14 September 2022	1922 Konyaspor	2 – 0 (a.e.t.)	Alanya Kestelspor	-
15:00	Koç 110'; Uzun 114'			Stadium: -

14 September 2022	Şile Yıldızspor	1 – 1 (a.e.t.) (4-3 p)	Darıca Gençlerbirliği	-
15:30	Oral 58'		Uğur 57'	Stadium: -
	Penalties
	Sevindir (penalty scored); Sarı (penalty scored); Tosun (penalty scored); Şen (penalty missed); Yavaşoğlu (penalty scored)		(penalty scored) Çalışkan; (penalty scored) Özeren; (penalty missed) Uğur; (penalty scored) Nasuh; (penalty missed) Yetim

14 September 2022	Büyükçekmece Tepecikspor	2 – 0	Bayrampaşa	-
15:30	Şimşek 3'; Ayar 90+4'			Stadium: -

14 September 2022	Turgutluspor	1 – 1 (a.e.t.) (2-4 p)	Kuşadasıspor	-
15:30	Öz 42'		Okçu 55'	Stadium: -

14 September 2022	Bergama Belediyespor	1 – 2	Karşıyaka	-
15:45	Topçu 84'		Ergen 8'; Pala 17'	Stadium: -

14 September 2022	Eskişehirspor	2 – 1 (a.e.t.)	Çankaya FK	-
19:00	Arı 71'; Altınoluk 113'		Karaahmet 2'	Stadium: -

15 September 2022	Niğde Anadolu FK	3 – 2	Kahramanmaraşspor	-
13:00	Kahraman 33'; Kurt 56'; Alpaslan 90+2'		Çetin 3'; Küçük 5'	Stadium: -

15 September 2022	Mazıdağı Fosfat SK	w/o	Bitlis Özgüzeldere	-
14:30				Stadium: -

15 September 2022	Nevşehir Belediyespor	3 – 1	Yozgatspor 1959 FK	-
15:00	Kılıç 38', 70'; Güçlü 48'		Demir 89'	Stadium: -

15 September 2022	1074 Çankırıspor	0 – 4	Boyabat 1868 Spor	-
15:00			Baykal 19' (pen.); Boncukçu 53' (pen.); Uzun 70', 86'	Stadium: -

15 September 2022	Karaman Futbol Kulübü	2 – 0 (a.e.t.)	Burdur MAKÜ Spor	-
15:00	Dilek 95'; Çavdar 109'			Stadium: -

15 September 2022	Çatalcaspor	4 – 1	Edirnespor	-
15:45	Aynacı 8'; Kurt 28'; Seyhun 86'; Civek 90+1'		Yakupçebioğlu 54'	Stadium: -

== Second round ==
22 Second League, 29 Third League and 7 Regional Amateur League teams competed in this round. Seeds were applied in the single-leg round. Seeded teams played at home. The draw was made on 16 September 2022. The match schedules were announced on 20 September 2022. 16 seeded and 13 unseeded teams qualified for the next round. Biggest upset was Boyabat 1868 Spor (144) eliminating Bursaspor (40). Lowest-ranked team qualified for the next round was Boyabat 1868 Spor (144). Highest-ranked team eliminated was Kocaelispor (39).

27 September 2022	İnegölspor	1 – 2 (a.e.t.)	Ağrı 1970 Spor	-
13:00	Salman 19'		Gundak 70'; Yaşar 119'	Stadium: -

27 September 2022	Ankaraspor	5 – 2	Kepez Belediyespor	-
14:30	Çapar 32'; Karadağ 45+2', 47', 61'; Köse 71'		Eyüpoğlu 27' (pen.); Gayla 87'	Stadium: -

27 September 2022	Zonguldak Kömürspor	0 – 1	Gümüşhanespor	-
14:30			İlkyaz 47'	Stadium: -

27 September 2022	Kocaelispor	1 – 4	Ayvalıkgücü Belediyespor	-
15:00	Öztürk 77'		Baytar 20'; Ünal 58'; Akbaba 66'; Ayaz 90+1'	Stadium: -

27 September 2022	Somaspor	2 – 2 (a.e.t.) (4-5 p)	Efeler 09 Spor	-
15:00	Tursun 90+3'; Bulut 91'		Deniz 7'; Çetinkaya 120'	Stadium: -
	Penalties
	Vural (penalty scored); Ceylan (penalty missed); Şengül (penalty scored); Tursun (penalty scored); Uzun (penalty scored); Birdal (penalty missed)		(penalty scored) Çarkçı; (penalty missed) Daylak; (penalty scored) Öztürk; (penalty scored) Kabul; (penalty scored) Yılmaz; (penalty scored) Çetinkaya

27 September 2022	Balıkesirspor	2 – 1 (a.e.t.)	Hacettepe 1945	-
17:30	Çakır 79'; Aydoğdu 105'		Karabulut 32' (o.g.)	Stadium: -

28 September 2022	Kastamonuspor 1966	0 – 0 (a.e.t.) (5-4 p)	Nevşehir Belediyespor	-
13:00				Stadium: -
	Penalties
	Öcal (penalty scored); Bektaş (penalty scored); Özel (penalty scored); Olkan (penalty scored); Arli (penalty scored)		(penalty missed) Tez; (penalty scored) Kasapoğlu; (penalty scored) Akyüz; (penalty scored) Öztonga; (penalty scored) İravul

28 September 2022	Adıyaman FK	1 – 0 (a.e.t.)	Bartınspor	-
14:00	Işılak 112'			Stadium: -

28 September 2022	Pazarspor	1 – 0	Mazıdağı Fosfat SK	-
14:00	Selimoğlu 45+1'			Stadium: -

28 September 2022	1922 Konyaspor	1 – 2	Karaköprü Belediyespor	-
14:30	Bozkurt 75'		Taşdemir 17'; Şahin 90'	Stadium: -

28 September 2022	Ankara Demirspor	0 – 2	Karaman Futbol Kulübü	-
14:30			Çavdar 9'; Akyüz 60'	Stadium: -

28 September 2022	Etimesgut Belediyespor	3 – 1	Yalovaspor	-
14:30	Polat 69'; Akbulut 76'; Samur 82'		Tinmaz 57'	Stadium: -

28 September 2022	Kırşehir Futbol Spor Kulübü	2 – 1	Kilis Belediyespor	-
14:30	Diker 82', 95'		Avcı 33'	Stadium: -

28 September 2022	Niğde Anadolu FK	2 – 1	Yomraspor	-
14:30	Çelik 8'; Fırat 79'		Yılmaz 45'	Stadium: -

28 September 2022	Serik Belediyespor	1 – 0	1954 Kelkit Bld.Spor	-
14:30	Kavaklıdere 82'			Stadium: -

28 September 2022	Afjet Afyonspor	2 – 4	Eynesil Bld.	-
15:00	Tankul 23'; Koç 51' (o.g.)		Gözel 19'; Delimehmet 39'; Kılıç 63'; Meral 81'	Stadium: -

28 September 2022	Ergene Velimeşe	0 – 1	Elazığ Karakoçan FK	-
15:00			Kaya 58'	Stadium: -

28 September 2022	Kuşadasıspor	0 – 1	Bulvarspor	-
15:00			Topkaya 31'	Stadium: -

28 September 2022	Kırklarelispor	5 – 0	Siirt İl Özel İdare	-
15:00	Cebeci 73'; Arslan 78', 90+1'; Vural 86' (pen.); Güneş 90+5'			Stadium: -

28 September 2022	Nazilli Belediyespor	2 – 1	Şile Yıldızspor	-
15:00	Üge 41'; Çağlar 45+1'		Sarı 87'	Stadium: -

28 September 2022	Sarıyer	3 – 0	Büyükçekmece Tepecikspor	-
15:00	Çuha 50'; Aydın 87', 90+3'			Stadium: -

28 September 2022	Uşak Spor	2 – 1	Malatya Arguvan Bld.	-
15:00	Önde 49'; Aktaş 85'		Güllü 56'	Stadium: -

28 September 2022	Çatalcaspor	2 – 3	Sapanca Gençlikspor	-
15:00	Kurt 10', 116'		Pehlivan 55' (pen.); Taşdelen 93'; Uymaz 109'	Stadium: -

28 September 2022	Şanlıurfaspor	4 – 2	Karşıyaka	-
17:30	Aydın 22'; Gazanfer 27'; Balat 29', 41'		Taşdelen 17', 54' (pen.)	Stadium: -

28 September 2022	Bursaspor	0 – 1	Boyabat 1868 Spor	-
20:00			Uzun 14'	Stadium: -

29 September 2022	Diyarbekir Spor	3 – 0	Kars 36 Spor	-
14:00	Yağmur 11'; Çalışan 78'; Karakuş 82' (pen.)			Stadium: -

29 September 2022	Belediye Derincespor	0 – 1 (a.e.t.)	Amasyaspor 1968 Futbol Kulübü	-
15:00			Karagöz 111'	Stadium: -

29 September 2022	Menemenspor	3 – 2	Bigaspor	-
17:00	Kayılıbal 59'; Açıkgöz 77', 82'		Mete 6'; Deniz 90+4'	Stadium: -

29 September 2022	Eskişehirspor	2 – 3	Muş 1984 Muşspor	-
20:00	Yakut 33' (pen.), 70' (pen.)		Karadağ 16'; Kuzey 86'; Bulut 90+3'	Stadium: -

== Third round ==
7 Super League, 13 First League, 25 Second League, 22 Third League and 1 Regional Amateur League teams competed in this round. Seeds were applied in the single-leg round. Seeded teams played at home. The draw was made on 4 October 2022. The match schedules were announced on 7 October 2022. 27 seeded and 7 unseeded teams qualified for the next round. Biggest upset was Efeler 09 Spor (130) eliminating Altay (21). Lowest-ranked team qualified for the next round was Efeler 09 Spor (130). Highest-ranked team eliminated was Hatayspor (12).

18 October 2022	Kasımpaşa	2 – 1 (a.e.t.)	Yeni Mersin İdman Yurdu	-
13:00	Demirel 80'; Tirpan 113'		Beytaş 30'	Stadium: -

18 October 2022	Altay	1 – 2 (a.e.t.)	Efeler 09 Spor	-
14:00	Uluç 12'		Sudun 45' (pen.); Gülen 97'	Stadium: -

18 October 2022	Ankaraspor	2 – 1 (a.e.t.)	Pazarspor	-
14:00	Bekdemir 7'; Cengiz 102'		Eskiköy 71'	Stadium: -

18 October 2022	Manisa FK	2 – 2 (a.e.t.) (7-6 p)	Eynesil Bld.	-
14:00	Gakpa 70' (pen.); Diallo 120'		Delimehmet 10'; Şensoy 107'	Stadium: -
	Penalties
	Gakpa (penalty scored); Büyük (penalty missed); Çalışkan (penalty scored); Altıparmak (penalty scored); Kör (penalty scored); Giritlioğlu (penalty scored); Şahin (penalty scored); Karapo (penalty scored)		(penalty missed) Kılıç; (penalty scored) Ay; (penalty scored) Şensoy; (penalty scored) Meral; (penalty scored) Akman; (penalty scored) Koç; (penalty scored) Dilli; (penalty missed) Koca

18 October 2022	Çaykur Rizespor	3 – 0	Boyabat 1868 Spor	-
15:00	Hümmet 12'; Bolasie 16' van den Hurk 62' (pen.)			Stadium: -

18 October 2022	Kayserispor	2 – 1	Iğdır Futbol Kulübü	-
17:30	Parlak 3'; Hosseini 84'		Kurt 47'	Stadium: -

18 October 2022	Adana Demirspor	5 – 0	Adıyaman FK	-
20:30	Sarı 44'; Öztümer 60', 64', 74'; Töre 85'			Stadium: -

19 October 2022	Kırklarelispor	2 – 0	52 Orduspor FK	-
13:00	Arslan 41'; Karataş 65'			Stadium: -

19 October 2022	Van Spor FK	2 – 3 (a.e.t.)	Elazığ Karakoçan FK	-
13:00	Doğan 5'; Bilal 61'		Kaya 9', 88'; Tekin 119' (o.g.)	Stadium: -

19 October 2022	Adanaspor	1 – 0	Orduspor 1967 SK	-
14:00	Türker 90+3'			Stadium: -

19 October 2022	Altınordu	5 – 0	Sapanca Gençlikspor	-
14:00	Efe 38', 64'; Kocaer 52', 66'; Talga 68'			Stadium: -

19 October 2022	Balıkesirspor	0 – 1	Ofspor	-
14:00			Bala 67'	Stadium: -

19 October 2022	Çorum FK	1 – 1 (a.e.t.) (3-4 p)	Esenler Erokspor	-
14:00	Değirmencioğlu 52'		Kayar 41'	Stadium: -
	Penalties
	Nalbantoğlu (penalty missed); Aydınlı (penalty scored); Damar (penalty scored); Yalçınkaya (penalty missed); Akkaynak (penalty scored)		(penalty scored) Yılmaz; (penalty scored) Yurtseven; (penalty missed) Akyel; (penalty scored) Ünlü; (penalty scored) Baştan

19 October 2022	Denizlispor	2 – 1	Ayvalıkgücü Belediyespor	-
14:00	Gündem 61'; Akdarı 87'		Hüner 1'	Stadium: -

19 October 2022	Etimesgut Belediyespor	2 – 0	68 Aksaray Belediyespor	-
14:00	Polat 49'; Akın 88'			Stadium: -

19 October 2022	Göztepe	2 – 0 (a.e.t.)	Karaköprü Belediyespor	-
14:00	Öztekin 102' (pen.); Tijanić 110'			Stadium: -

19 October 2022	Keçiörengücü	4 – 1	Diyarbekir Spor	-
14:00	Mara 4' (pen.); Eze 66'; İnan 67'; Balaj 90+3'		Karakuş 71'	Stadium: -

19 October 2022	Kırşehir Futbol Spor Kulübü	1 – 0 (a.e.t.)	İskenderunspor A.Ş.	-
14:00	Erçelik 111'			Stadium: -

19 October 2022	Nazilli Belediyespor	2 – 1	Arnavutköy Belediye	-
14:00	Gökbayrak 64'; Kılıçaslan 80'		Acun 24'	Stadium: -

18 October 2022	Serik Belediyespor	2 – 1	Batman Petrolspor	-
14:00	Doğan 54'; Göksel 78'		Konak 61'	Stadium: -

19 October 2022	Şanlıurfaspor	3 – 0	Karaman Futbol Kulübü	-
14:00	Balat 43'; Fıstıkcı 73', 88'			Stadium: -

19 October 2022	Uşak Spor	4 – 2 (a.e.t.)	Gümüşhanespor	-
14:00	Aktaş 35'; Kahrıman 69', 105+1'; Başaran 111'		Olgaç 56'; Koca 75'	Stadium: -

19 October 2022	1928 Bucaspor	3 – 0	Artvin Hopaspor	-
14:00	Behram 22', 39'; Depe 45+1'			Stadium: -

19 October 2022	24Erzincanspor	0 – 1	Belediye Kütahyaspor	-
14:00			Tekşen 89'	Stadium: -

19 October 2022	Boluspor	1 – 0	Fethiyespor	-
15:00	Papaker 59'			Stadium: -

19 October 2022	Samsunspor	3 – 0	Muş 1984 Muşspor	-
17:00	Sagat 20', 78', 80'			Stadium: -

19 October 2022	Hatayspor	0 – 2	Düzcespor	-
19:00			Gündoğdu 31'; Karadağ 90+6'	Stadium: -

19 October 2022	Galatasaray	7 – 0	Kastamonuspor 1966	-
21:00	Işık 27' (o.g.); Seferovic 39'; Gomis 53'; Rashica 56'; Ross 65'; Aktürkoğlu 74'; Akman 81'			Stadium: -

20 October 2022	Gençlerbirliği	3 – 1 (a.e.t.)	Niğde Anadolu FK	-
13:00	Tuzcu 45+2', 110'; Alıcı 113'		Çalık 5'	Stadium: -

20 October 2022	Menemenspor	0 – 1 (a.e.t.)	Bulvarspor	-
14:00			Güven 112'	Stadium: -

20 October 2022	Tuzlaspor	2 – 1 (a.e.t.)	Bursa Yıldırımspor	-
14:00	Mata 112'; Bayrak 120+2'		Üresin 105'	Stadium: -

20 October 2022	Yeni Malatyaspor	3 – 3 (a.e.t.) (5-4 p)	Ağrı 1970 Spor	-
15:00	Alkan 17' (pen.); Altıntaş 81'; Kaba 89' (o.g.)		Kavlak 54' (o.g.); Kılıç 67'; Torun 76' (pen.)	Stadium: -
	Penalties
	Başdaş (penalty scored); Altıntaş (penalty scored); Özçiçek (penalty scored); Emeksiz (penalty scored); Nshimirimana (penalty scored)		(penalty scored) Torun; (penalty missed) Kılıç; (penalty scored) Kartal; (penalty scored) Altunbudak; (penalty scored) Kaba

20 October 2022	Giresunspor	3 – 1	Amasyaspor 1968 Futbol Kulübü	-
17:30	Akpınar 42'; Sağlam 66'; Serginho 70'		Seven 38' (o.g.)	Stadium: -

20 October 2022	Gaziantep FK	4 – 0	Sarıyer	-
20:30	Parmak 32'; Figueiredo 78', 85'; Merkel 83'			Stadium: -

== Fourth round ==
13 Super League, 18 First League, 18 Second League and 5 Third League teams competed in this round. Seeds were applied in the single-leg round. Seeded teams played at home. The draw was made on 21 October 2022. The match schedules were announced on 26 October 2022. 22 seeded and 5 unseeded teams qualified for the next round. Biggest upset was Esenler Erokspor (72) eliminating Erzurumspor FK (25). Lowest-ranked team qualified for the next round was Esenler Erokspor (72). Highest-ranked team eliminated was Yeni Malatyaspor (23).

8 November 2022	Kasımpaşa	6 – 1	1461 Trabzon FK	-
13:00	Demirel 7', 41'; Kara 8', 32'; Hajradinović 26'; Fall 66'		Yıldırım 88'	Stadium: -

8 November 2022	Erzurumspor FK	2 – 2 (a.e.t.) (1-3 p)	Esenler Erokspor	-
14:00	Oskan 21', 55'		Furat 62'; Aygün 83'	Stadium: -
	Penalties
	Akgün (penalty missed); Baydan (penalty missed); Özhan (penalty scored); Uzunel (penalty missed)		(penalty scored) Yılmaz; (penalty scored) Genç; (penalty missed) Kayar; (penalty scored) Aygün

8 November 2022	Yeni Malatyaspor	0 – 1	Uşak Spor	-
14:00			Demir 28'	Stadium: -

8 November 2022	Alanyaspor	3 – 0	Sakaryaspor	-
15:00	Cavaleiro 5'; Aydın 77', 88'			Stadium: -

8 November 2022	MKE Ankaragücü	6 – 2	Amed Sportif	-
17:00	Jese 7', 45+2'; Osmanoğlu 9'; Zahid 28', 74'; Chatzigiovannis 46'		Osmanoğlu 85' (o.g.); Gümüş 89'	Stadium: -

8 November 2022	Adana Demirspor	4 – 3	Nazilli Belediyespor	-
19:00	Assombalonga 15', 29' (pen.), 51', 90+6' (pen.)		Aydoğmuş 13'; Kılıçaslan 34'; Apaydın 63'	Stadium: -

8 November 2022	Galatasaray	2 – 1	Ofspor	-
21:00	Seferovic 37'; Kutlu 79'		Türkyılmaz 18'	Stadium: -

9 November 2022	Giresunspor	3 – 2	Ankaraspor	-
13:00	Savićević 60', 90+3'; Eguskiza 70'		Bekdemir 18'; Köse 53'	Stadium: -

9 November 2022	Keçiörengücü	4 – 2	Bulvarspor	-
13:00	Babaei 8', 41'; İnan 63'; Balaj 81'		Can 47', 87'	Stadium: -

9 November 2022	Ümraniyespor	4 – 0	Efeler 09 Spor	-
13:00	Mršić 28' (pen.); Bettaieb 58'; Hacımustafaoğlu 67'; Gheorghe 74'			Stadium: -

9 November 2022	Altınordu	0 – 1 (a.e.t.)	Bodrumspor	-
14:00			Çayir 107'	Stadium: -

9 November 2022	Bandırmaspor	0 – 3	Karacabey Belediye Spor	-
14:00			Ertürk 46'; Diler 82'; Türk 87'	Stadium: -

9 November 2022	Boluspor	2 – 1	Tarsus İdman Yurdu	-
14:00	Demir 57'; Bregu 63'		Akçakın 72' (pen.)	Stadium: -

9 November 2022	Eyüpspor	2 – 1	Düzcespor	-
14:00	Bulut 4'; Sekidika 77'		Özdıraz 83'	Stadium: -

9 November 2022	Gençlerbirliği	1 – 0	Bayburt Özel İdare Spor	-
14:00	Başyiğit 4'			Stadium: -

9 November 2022	Manisa FK	3 – 0	23 Elazığ Futbol Kulübü	-
14:00	Yurdakul 45+2'; Ilgaz 55'; Sarı 71'			Stadium: -

9 November 2022	Samsunspor	4 – 0	Adanaspor	-
15:00	Tanque 17', 55'; Yaldır 38'; Laura 79'			Stadium: -

9 November 2022	Antalyaspor	3 – 0	Pendikspor	-
17:00	Adriano 9', 33'; Aydoğdu 45+1'			Stadium: -

9 November 2022	Gaziantep FK	2 – 0	Belediye Kütahyaspor	-
19:00	Pekhart 38'; Çakır 74' (o.g.)			Stadium: -

9 November 2022	Beşiktaş	3 – 1	Serik Belediyespor	-
21:00	Redmond 5'; Muleka 9'; Alli 34'		Kavaklıdere 66'	Stadium: -

10 November 2022	İstanbulspor	3 – 2 (a.e.t.)	Etimesgut Belediyespor	-
13:00	Topalli 71'; Rroca 75'; Yeşil 118'		Polat 1'; Kinali 10'	Stadium: -

10 November 2022	Göztepe	2 – 0	1928 Bucaspor	-
14:00	Kvasina 24'; Atanga 60'			Stadium: -

10 November 2022	Tuzlaspor	2 – 1 (a.e.t.)	Isparta 32 Spor	-
14:00	Kone 8', 95'		Afkan 31'	Stadium: -

10 November 2022	Çaykur Rizespor	2 – 1	Kırklarelispor	-
15:00	Keser 16', 75'		Arslan 29'	Stadium: -

10 November 2022	Denizlispor	0 – 5	Şanlıurfaspor	-
17:00			Erboğa 8' (pen.), 55' (pen.); Belen 39'; Balat 69', 82'	Stadium: -

10 November 2022	Fatih Karagümrük	3 – 1	Kırşehir Futbol Spor Kulübü	-
19:00	Diagne 32'; Dursun 73'; Borini 88' (pen.)		Yorulmaz 57' (pen.)	Stadium: -

10 November 2022	Kayserispor	1 – 0	Sivas Belediyespor	-
21:00	Başsan 48'			Stadium: -

== Bracket ==
Fifth round
Fenerbahçe	3
İstanbulspor	1
Adana Demirspor	3
Çaykur Rizespor (a.e.t.)	4
Antalyaspor	1
Manisa FK	0
Kayserispor	2
Gençlerbirliği	0
Sivasspor	5
Esenler Erokspor	2
Giresunspor	0
Karacabey Belediyespor	5
Gaziantep FK	3
Boluspor	1
Konyaspor (a.e.t.)	3
Bodrumspor	2
MKE Ankaragücü	2
Tuzlaspor	0
Beşiktaş	4
Şanlıurfaspor	2
Kasımpaşa	1
Ümraniyespor	2
Trabzonspor	3
Samsunspor	0
Alanyaspor (a.e.t.)	3
Eyüpspor	2
Galatasaray	1
Ankara Keçiörengücü	0
Fatih Karagümrük	3
Uşakspor	0
İstanbul Başakşehir	3
Göztepe	1

Round of 16
Fenerbahçe	2
Çaykur Rizespor	1
Antalyaspor	0
Kayserispor (a.e.t.)	2
Sivasspor	3
Karacabey Belediyespor	0
Gaziantep FK (pen.)	1 (7)
Konyaspor	1 (6)
MKE Ankaragücü (pen.)	1 (4)
Beşiktaş	1 (3)
Ümraniyespor	1
Trabzonspor (a.e.t.)	4
Alanyaspor	1
Galatasaray	2
Fatih Karagümrük	2 (3)
İstanbul Başakşehir (pen.)	2 (5)

Quarterfinals
Fenerbahçe	4
Kayserispor	1
Sivasspor (w/o)	3
Gaziantep FK	0
MKE Ankaragücü	3
Trabzonspor	1
Galatasaray	2
İstanbul Başakşehir	3

Semifinals
Fenerbahçe	0	3	3
Sivasspor	0	0	0
MKE Ankaragücü	0	2	2
İstanbul Başakşehir (a.e.t.)	1	2	3

Final
Fenerbahçe	2
İstanbul Başakşehir	0

== Fifth round ==
18 Super League, 10 First League and 4 Second League teams competed in this round. Seeds were applied in the single-leg round. Seeded teams played at home. The draw was made on 11 November 2022. The match schedules were announced on 9 December 2022. 13 seeded and 3 unseeded teams qualified for the next round. Biggest upset was Karacabey Belediye Spor (45) eliminating Giresunspor (16). Lowest-ranked team qualified for the next round was Karacabey Belediye Spor (45). Highest-ranked team eliminated was Adana Demirspor (10).

20 December 2022	Kasımpaşa	1–2	Ümraniyespor	Istanbul
13:00	Mallı 88'		Mršić 59' (pen.); Mimaroğlu 86'	Stadium: Recep Tayyip Erdoğan

20 December 2022	MKE Ankaragücü	2–0	Tuzlaspor	Ankara
13:00	Jesé 7'; Macheda 55'			Stadium: Akdeniz Üniversitesi

20 December 2022	Sivasspor	5–2	Esenler Erokspor	Sivas
15:00	Yatabaré 11', 25', 44'; Yeşilyurt 52'; Gradel 79' (pen.)		Furat 36'; Baştan 59'	Stadium: Bahçeşehir Koleji Sivas 4 Eylül

20 December 2022	Antalyaspor	1–0	Manisa	Antalya
17:00	Wright 77' (pen.)			Stadium: Corendon Airlines Park Antalya

20 December 2022	İstanbul Başakşehir	3–1	Göztepe	Istanbul
19:00	Gürler 21', 24'; Okaka 37'		Furkan 73'	Stadium: Başakşehir Fatih Terim

20 December 2022	Fenerbahçe	3–1	İstanbulspor	Istanbul
21:00	King 31'; Batshuayi 34', 54'		Topalli 90+4'	Stadium: Ülker

21 December 2022	Giresunspor	0–5	Karacabey Belediyespor	Giresun
13:00			Kuşan 10', 32'; Balıkçı 50', 68'; Aktay 84' (pen.)	Stadium: Çotanak

21 December 2022	Fatih Karagümrük	3–0	Uşak Spor	Istanbul
15:00	Kouassi 14'; Colley 71'; Richards 84'			Stadium: Esenler Erokspor

21 December 2022	Alanyaspor	3–2 (a.e.t.)	Eyüpspor	Antalya
17:00	Ferhat 62'; Hassan 81'; Doumbia 113'		Demir 9'; İlter 86'	Stadium: Kırbıyık Holding

21 December 2022	Trabzonspor	3–0	Samsunspor	Trabzon
19:00	Bozok 10'; Ünüvar 28', 79'			Stadium: Şenol Güneş

21 December 2022	Beşiktaş	4–2	Şanlıurfaspor	Istanbul
21:00	Tosun 67', 69'; N'Koudou 73'; Weghorst 85'		Rüzgar 9', 15'	Stadium: Vodafone Park

22 December 2022	Kayserispor	2–0	Gençlerbirliği	Kayseri
13:00	Sazdağı 70'; Pektemek 76'			Stadium: RHG Enertürk Enerji

22 December 2022	Konyaspor	3–2 (a.e.t.)	Bodrumspor	Konya
15:00	Hadžiahmetović 64', 105' (pen.); Subaşı 114'		Kurtuluş 83', 110'	Stadium: Medaş Konya Büyükşehir

22 December 2022	Gaziantep FK	3–1	Boluspor	Gaziantep
17:00	Maxim 42' (pen.); Ersoy 66'; Marković 90+3'		Bregu 87'	Stadium: Kalyon

22 December 2022	Adana Demirspor	3–4 (a.e.t.)	Çaykur Rizespor	Adana
19:00	Akintola 68' (pen.); Öztürk 85' (o.g.); Sarı 117'		Yılmaz 7'; Hümmet 45+1'; Kanatsızkuş 105'; Koç 108'	Stadium: Yeni Adana

22 December 2022	Galatasaray	1–0	Keçiörengücü	Istanbul
21:00	Gomis 82'			Stadium: Ali Sami Yen

== Round of 16 ==
14 Super League, 1 First League and 1 Second League teams competed in this round. Seeds were applied in the single-leg round. The draw was made on 23 December 2022. The match schedules were announced on 6 January 2023. 4 seeded and 4 unseeded teams qualified for the next round. Biggest upset was Gaziantep FK (15) eliminating Konyaspor (4). Lowest-ranked team qualifying for the next round was MKE Ankaragücü (17). Highest-ranked team eliminated was Konyaspor (4).

17 January 2023	Sivasspor	3–0	Karacabey Belediye Spor	Kayseri
14:30	Arslan 38', 74'; N'Jie 84'			Stadium: RHG Enertürk Enerji

17 January 2023	Antalyaspor	0–2 (a.e.t.)	Kayserispor	Antalya
17:30			Cardoso 105'; Balcı 120'	Stadium: Corendon Airlines Park Antalya

17 January 2023	Alanyaspor	1–2	Galatasaray	Antalya
20:30	Cavaleiro 67'		Nelsson 16'; Mertens 38'	Stadium: Kırbıyık Holding

18 January 2023	Fatih Karagümrük	2–2 (a.e.t.) (3–5 p)	İstanbul Başakşehir	Istanbul
14:30	Diagne 68'; Frei 115'		Mercan 71' (o.g.); Türüç 120+1' (pen.)	Stadium: Esenyurt Necmi Kadıoğlu
	Penalties
	Richards (penalty scored); Drešević (penalty scored); Biraschi (penalty missed); Shukurov (penalty scored)		(penalty scored) Türüç; (penalty scored) Lima; (penalty scored) Özcan; (penalty scored) Ndayishimiye; (penalty scored) Caiçara

18 January 2023	MKE Ankaragücü	1–1 (a.e.t.) (4–3 p)	Beşiktaş	Ankara
17:45	Sowe 12'		Tosun 77'	Stadium: Eryaman
	Penalties
	Ciğerci (penalty scored); Sowe (penalty scored); Xavier (penalty scored); Pedrinho (penalty scored)		(penalty scored) Saiss; (penalty missed) Hutchinson; (penalty scored) Kesgin; (penalty scored) Redmond; (penalty missed) Masuaku

18 January 2023	Ümraniyespor	1–4 (a.e.t.)	Trabzonspor	Istanbul
20:30	Nayir 12'		Hugo 90+3'; Yazıcı 104', 111' (pen.); Gomez 114'	Stadium: Ümraniye Şehir

19 January 2023	Gaziantep FK	1–1 (a.e.t.) (7–6 p)	Konyaspor	Gaziantep
17:30	Eskihellaç 108'		Diouf 120+4'	Stadium: Kalyon
	Penalties
	Maxim (penalty scored); Figueiredo (penalty scored); Jevtović (penalty scored); Merkel (penalty scored); Cihan (penalty scored); Djilobodji (penalty scored); Eskihellaç (penalty scored)		(penalty scored) Dikmen; (penalty scored) Calvo; (penalty scored) Ülgün; (penalty scored) Guilherme; (penalty scored) Büyüksayar; (penalty scored) Pavičić; (penalty missed) Yazğılı

19 January 2023	Fenerbahçe	2–1	Çaykur Rizespor	Istanbul
20:30	Zajc 12'; Valencia 89'		Osmanoğlu 26'	Stadium: Ülker

== Quarter-finals ==
8 Super League teams competed in this round. Seeds were applied in the single-leg round. The draw was made on 24 January 2023.

Seeded (4 clubs)	Unseeded (4 clubs)
Sivasspor	Galatasaray
Trabzonspor	Kayserispor
Fenerbahçe	Gaziantep FK
İstanbul Başakşehir	MKE Ankaragücü

4 April 2023	MKE Ankaragücü	3–1	Trabzonspor	Ankara
20:30 TRT	Sowe 51', 83'; Diack 68'	Report	Ömür 22'	Stadium: Eryaman Stadium; Referee: Zorbay Küçük

5 April 2023	Galatasaray	2–3	İstanbul Başakşehir	Istanbul
20:30 TRT	Ayhan 20'; Icardi 51'	Report	Szysz 12', 66'; Aleksić 30'	Stadium: Nef Stadium; Referee: Kadir Sağlam

6 April 2023	Fenerbahçe	4–1	Kayserispor	Istanbul
20:30 TRT	Mor 8', 42'; Dursun 58'; Güler 90'	Report	Kolovetsios 18'	Stadium: Şükrü Saracoğlu Stadium; Referee: Volkan Bayarslan

Sivasspor	3–0 (w/o)	Gaziantep FK
	Report
Note: Gaziantep FK withdrew from the tournament due to the 2023 Turkey–Syria earthquake. Sivasspor, therefore, were awarded a 3–0 win, advancing to the semi-finals.

== Semi-finals ==
=== First leg ===
3 May 2023	Sivasspor	0–0	Fenerbahçe	Sivas
20:30 TRT		Report		Stadium: New Sivas 4 Eylül Stadium; Referee: Atilla Karaoğlan

4 May 2023	İstanbul Başakşehir	1–0	MKE Ankaragücü	Istanbul
20:30 TRT	Figueiredo 90+6'	Report		Stadium: Başakşehir Fatih Terim Stadium; Referee: Zorbay Küçük

=== Second leg ===
24 May 2023	Fenerbahçe	3–0 (3–0 agg.)	Sivasspor	Istanbul
20:30 TRT	Kadıoğlu 47'; Batshuayi 58'; King 85'	Report		Stadium: Şükrü Saracoğlu Stadium; Referee: Volkan Bayarslan

25 May 2023	MKE Ankaragücü	2–2 (a.e.t.) (2–3 agg.)	İstanbul Başakşehir	Ankara
20:30 TRT	Sowe 11'; Chatzigiovanis 90'	Report	Gürler 61'; Kény 111'	Stadium: Eryaman Stadium; Referee: Ali Şansalan

== Final ==
11 June 2023
20:45 TRT

Fenerbahçe	2–0	İstanbul Başakşehir
Batshuayi 1', 29'	Report

Gürsel Aksel Stadium, İzmir
Attendance: 12,182
Referee: Atilla Karaoğlan

== Top scorers ==
Rank	Player	Club	Goals
1	(Belgium) Michy Batshuayi	Fenerbahçe	5
1	(Germany) Bünyamin Balat	Şanlıurfaspor	5
3	(Germany) Ensar Arslan	Kırklarelispor	4
3	(Democratic Republic of the Congo) Britt Assombalonga	Adana Demirspor	4
3	(Turkey) Murat Torun	Ağrı 1970 Spor	4
6	(Spain) Jesé	MKE Ankaragücü	3
6	(The Gambia) Ali Sowe	MKE Ankaragücü	3
6	(Mali) Mustapha Yatabare	Sivasspor	3
6	(Turkey) Ali Sühan Demirel	Kasımpaşa	3
6	(Turkey) Berk Karadağ	Ankaraspor	3
6	(Turkey) İbrahim Kaya	23 Elazığ Futbol Kulübü	3
6	(Turkey) Reha Kurt	Çatalcaspor	3
6	(Turkey) Erhun Öztümer	Adana Demirspor	3
6	(Turkey) Furkan Polat	Etimesgut Belediyespor	3
6	(Turkey) Ahmet Sagat	Samsunspor	3
6	(Turkey) Cenk Tosun	Beşiktaş	3
6	(Turkey) Sinan Uzun	Boyabat 1868 Spor	3

== Seedings ==
Seed	Team	Entering in round	2022-23	2021-22	Rank (Pts; GD)	Seed	Team	Entering in round	2022-23	2021-22	Rank (Pts; GD)	Seed	Team	Entering in round	2022-23	2021-22	Rank (Pts; GD)
1	Sivasspor	5T	SL	SL	CW	51	24Erzincanspor	3T	2L	2L	6 (1.59)	101	Karşıyaka	1T	3L	3L	8 (1.44)
2	Trabzonspor	5T	SL	SL	1	52	Çorum FK	3T	2L	2L	7 (1.71)	102	Şile Yıldızspor	1T	3L	3L	8 (1.31)
3	Fenerbahçe	5T	SL	SL	2	53	1928 Bucaspor	3T	2L	2L	7 (1.56)	103	Edirnespor	1T	3L	3L	9 (1.41)
4	Konyaspor	5T	SL	SL	3	54	Afjet Afyonspor	2T	2L	2L	8 (1.63)	104	1954 Kelkit Bld.Spor	1T	3L	3L	9 (1.41)
5	İstanbul Başakşehir	5T	SL	SL	4	55	Kırşehir Futbol Spor Kulübü	2T	2L	2L	8 (1.44)	105	Bayrampaşa	1T	3L	3L	9 (1.25)
6	Alanyaspor	4T	SL	SL	5	56	Ankaraspor	2T	2L	2L	9 (1.45)	106	Bergama Belediyespor	1T	3L	3L	10 (1.35)
7	Beşiktaş	4T	SL	SL	6	57	Ankara Demirspor	2T	2L	2L	9 (1.44)	107	Büyükçekmece Tepecikspor	1T	3L	3L	10 (1.29)
8	Antalyaspor	4T	SL	SL	7	58	Somaspor	2T	2L	2L	10 (1.39)	108	Hacettepe 1945	1T	3L	3L	10 (1.25)
9	Fatih Karagümrük	4T	SL	SL	8	59	Kırklarelispor	2T	2L	2L	10 (1.38)	109	Karaköprü Belediyespor	1T	3L	3L	11 (1.29)
10	Adana Demirspor	3T	SL	SL	9	60	Şanlıurfaspor	2T	2L	2L	11 (1.35)	110	Fatsa Belediyespor	1T	3L	3L	11 (1.24)
11	Kasımpaşa	3T	SL	SL	11	61	İnegölspor	2T	2L	2L	11 (1.34)	111	23 Elazığ Futbol Kulübü	1T	3L	3L	11 (1.19)
12	Hatayspor	3T	SL	SL	12	62	Nazilli Belediyespor	2T	2L	2L	12 (1.32)	112	Ağrı 1970 Spor	1T	3L	3L	12 (1.24)
13	Galatasaray	3T	SL	SL	13	63	Etimesgut Belediyespor	2T	2L	2L	12 (1.24)	113	Karaman Futbol Kulübü	1T	3L	3L	12 (1.18)
14	Kayserispor	3T	SL	SL	14	64	Serik Belediyespor	2T	2L	2L	13 (1.18)	114	Yomraspor	1T	3L	3L	12 (1.14)
15	Gaziantep FK	3T	SL	SL	15	65	Uşak Spor	2T	2L	2L	13 (1.18)	115	Gümüşhanespor	1T	3L	3L	13 (1.21)
16	Giresunspor	3T	SL	SL	16	66	Sarıyer	2T	2L	2L	14 (1.13)	116	Osmaniyespor FK	1T	3L	3L	13 (1.18)
17	MKE Ankaragücü	4T	SL	1L	1	67	Zonguldak Kömürspor	2T	2L	2L	14 (1.12)	117	Siirt İl Özel İdare	1T	3L	3L	13 (1.14)
18	Ümraniyespor	4T	SL	1L	2	68	Diyarbekir Spor	2T	2L	2L	15 (1.08)	118	Çankaya FK	1T	3L	3L	14 (1.21)
19	İstanbulspor	4T	SL	1L	4	69	Pazarspor	2T	2L	2L	15 (1.00)	119	Elazığspor	1T	3L	3L	14 (1.15)
20	Çaykur Rizespor	3T	1L	SL	17	70	Adıyaman FK	2T	2L	2L	16 (1.08)	120	Beyoğlu Yeniçarşıspor	1T	3L	3L	14 (1.14)
21	Altay	3T	1L	SL	18	71	Kastamonuspor	2T	2L	2L	19 (0.00)	121	Darıca Gençlerbirliği	1T	3L	3L	15 (1.06)
22	Göztepe	3T	1L	SL	19	72	Esenler Erokspor	3T	2L	3L	1 (2.24)	122	Bulvarspor	2T	3L	AL	1 (2.50)
23	Yeni Malatyaspor	3T	1L	SL	20	73	Batman Petrolspor	3T	2L	3L	1 (2.18)	123	Amasyaspor 1968 Futbol Kulübü	2T	3L	AL	1 (2.45)
24	Bandırmaspor	4T	1L	1L	3	74	Düzcespor	3T	2L	3L	1 (2.17)	124	Ayvalıkgücü Belediyespor	2T	3L	AL	1 (2.45)
25	Erzurumspor FK	4T	1L	1L	5	75	İskenderunspor A.Ş.	3T	2L	3L	2 (2.06)	125	Eynesil Bld.	2T	3L	AL	1 (2.45)
26	Eyüpspor	4T	1L	1L	6	76	Fethiyespor	3T	2L	3L	2 (1.94)	126	Sapanca Gençlikspor	2T	3L	AL	1 (2.30)
27	Samsunspor	3T	1L	1L	7	77	Arnavutköy Belediye	3T	2L	3L	4 (1.74)	127	Malatya Arguvan Bld.	2T	3L	AL	1 (2.28)
28	Boluspor	3T	1L	1L	8	78	Akhisarspor	1T	3L	2L	16 (0.91)	128	Kepez Belediyespor	2T	3L	AL	1 (2.20)
29	Manisa FK	3T	1L	1L	9	79	Turgutluspor	1T	3L	2L	17 (0.97)	129	Muş 1984 Muşspor	2T	3L	AL	1 (2.11)
30	Tuzlaspor	3T	1L	1L	10	80	1922 Konyaspor	1T	3L	2L	17 (0.85)	130	Efeler 09 Spor	2T	3L	AL	1 (2.05)
31	Denizlispor	3T	1L	1L	11	81	Ergene Velimeşe	1T	3L	2L	18 (0.92)	131	Bitlis Özgüzeldere	1T	AL	AL	1 (2.61)
32	Keçiörengücü	3T	1L	1L	12	82	Eskişehirspor	1T	3L	2L	18 (0.65)	132	Bartınspor	1T	AL	AL	1 (2.44)
33	Gençlerbirliği	3T	1L	1L	13	83	Niğde Anadolu FK	1T	3L	2L	19 (0.76)	133	Cizre Serhatspor	1T	AL	AL	2 (2.50)
34	Altınordu	3T	1L	1L	14	84	Kahramanmaraşspor	1T	3L	2L	20 (0.50)	134	Kilis Belediyespor	1T	AL	AL	2 (2.44)
35	Adanaspor	3T	1L	1L	15	85	Belediye Kütahyaspor	3T	3L	3L	2 (1.94)	135	Yalovaspor	1T	AL	AL	2 (2.17)
36	Pendikspor	4T	1L	2L	1 (2.26)	86	Iğdır Futbol Kulübü	3T	3L	3L	3 (2.00)	136	Yozgatspor 1959 FK	1T	AL	AL	3 (2.06)
37	Sakaryaspor	4T	1L	2L	1 (2.21)	87	Yeni Mersin İdman Yurdu	3T	3L	3L	3 (1.94)	137	Bilecik 1969	1T	AL	AL	3 (1.83)
38	Bodrumspor	4T	1L	2L	3 (1.89)	88	Bursa Yıldırımspor	3T	3L	3L	3 (1.82)	138	Mazıdağı Fosfat SK	1T	AL	AL	4 (1.88)
39	Kocaelispor	2T	2L	1L	16	89	Orduspor 1967 SK	3T	3L	3L	4 (1.88)	139	12 Bingölspor	1T	AL	AL	4 (1.69)
40	Bursaspor	2T	2L	1L	17	90	68 Aksaray Belediyespor	3T	3L	3L	4 (1.64)	140	Bigaspor	1T	AL	AL	4 (1.56)
41	Menemenspor	2T	2L	1L	18	91	Ofspor	3T	3L	3L	5 (1.76)	141	Yüksekova Belediyespor	1T	AL	AL	4 (1.33)
42	Balıkesirspor	2T	2L	1L	19	92	Artvin Hopaspor	3T	3L	3L	5 (1.74)	142	Dersimspor	1T	AL	AL	5 (1.44)
43	1461 Trabzon FK	4T	2L	2L	2 (1.95)	93	52 Orduspor FK	3T	3L	3L	5 (1.61)	143	Kars 36 Spor	1T	AL	AL	6 (1.06)
44	Amed Sportif	4T	2L	2L	2 (1.68)	94	Belediye Derincespor	2T	3L	3L	6 (1.68)	144	Boyabat 1868 Spor	1T	AL	AL	7 (1.35)
45	Karacabey Belediye Spor	4T	2L	2L	3 (1.65)	95	Alanya Kestelspor	1T	3L	3L	6 (1.58)	145	1074 Çankırıspor	1T	AL	AL	7 (1.00)
46	Sivas Belediyespor	4T	2L	2L	4 (1.82)	96	Erbaaspor	1T	3L	3L	6 (1.53)	146	Burdur MAKÜ Spor	1T	AL	AL	8 (1.06)
47	Isparta 32 Spor	4T	2L	2L	4 (1.62)	97	Kırıkkale Büyük Anadoluspor	1T	3L	3L	7 (1.68)	147	Serhat Ardahan	1T	AL	AL	8 (0.83)
48	Bayburt Özel İdare Spor	4T	2L	2L	5 (1.74)	98	Çatalcaspor	1T	3L	3L	7 (1.47)	148	Karabük İdmanyurdu Spor	1T	AL		
49	Tarsus İdman Yurdu	4T	2L	2L	5 (1.62)	99	Kuşadasıspor	1T	3L	3L	7 (1.31)						
50	Van Spor FK	3T	2L	2L	6 (1.74)	100	Nevşehir Belediyespor	1T	3L	3L	8 (1.47)						
