= Turkmenistan President's Cup =

International football tournament from 1995-2013

Turkmenistan President’s Cup was an international football tournament in Turkmenistan which was created in 1995 and dissolved in 2013. The tournament was dedicated to Day of State Flag of Turkmenistan. The tournament prize money was US 35,000. The winner would receive US$20,000 together with President’s Cup, the silver-medal winner – US$10,000 and the bronze-medal winner – US$5,000.

The international football tournament traditionally held in Ashgabat is very popular in the region. Over its history, teams from Armenia, Belarus, Georgia, Kazakhstan, Kyrgyz Republic, Latvia, Lithuania, Moldova, Russia, Ukraine, Uzbekistan, Tajikistan, Estonia, Iran, Turkey, Republic of Korea, China, Thailand competed for Turkmenistan President’s Cup. In 2009, a team from Bahrain made a debut in the tournament in Ashgabat thus extending it geographically to 20 countries.

During 19 years President's Cup left the country three times – Iranian Esteghlal won the honorary trophy in 1998, Georgian Torpedo Kutaisi in 2002 and Moldavian Dacia Chişinău in 2006. Nisa Aşgabat won the tournament four times (1999, 2003, 2004 and 2005). Köpetdag Aşgabat and HTTU Aşgabat each won this cup three times, respectively (1995, 1996 and 2001) and (2007, 2008 and 2009). The combined team of the football clubs of Turkmenistan (1997) and the combined team from Ashgabat (2000) won the President’s Cup once each.

== Winners ==
Year	Final			Third Place			Venue
Year	Winner	Score	Runner-up	Third place	Score	Fourth place	Venue
1995; Details	Köpetdag (Turkmenistan)	2 – 0	Turkmenistan	Metalurh Nikopol (Ukraine)	2 – 0	(Russia) Spartak-2 Moscow	Köpetdag Stadium, Ashgabat
1996; Details	Köpetdag (Turkmenistan)	1 – 0	(Latvia) Skonto Rīga	Zorya MALS Luhansk (Ukraine)	4 – 0	(Estonia) JK Narva Trans	Köpetdag Stadium, Ashgabat
1997; Details	Turkmenistan	2 – 1	(Ukraine) Vorskla Poltava	FC Yelimai Semei (Kazakhstan)	2 – 1	(Armenia) FK Yerevan	Nisa-Çandybil Stadium, Ashgabat
1998; Details	Esteghlal (Iran)	0 – 0 (7 – 6 pens.)	(Russia) FC Zenit St. Petersburg	Nisa Aşgabat (Turkmenistan)	1 – 0	(South Korea) Ulsan Hyundai	Köpetdag Stadium, Ashgabat
1999; Details	Nisa Aşgabat (Turkmenistan)	3 – 1	Turkmenistan Olympic	Köpetdag (Turkmenistan)	(Note: There was no official Third Place match in 1999. Semi-finalists are listed in alphabetical order.)	(Turkmenistan) Nebitçi Balkanabat	Köpetdag Stadium, Ashgabat
2000; Details	Ashgabat City (Turkmenistan)	1 – 0	(Turkmenistan) Ahal Velayat	Balkan Velayat (Turkmenistan)	3 – 0	(Uzbekistan) FK Guliston	Köpetdag Stadium, Ashgabat
2001; Details	Köpetdag (Turkmenistan)	2 – 0	(Ukraine) Dnipro Dnipropetrovsk	CSKA-2 Moscow (Russia)	(Note: There was no official Third Place match in 2001. Semi-finalists are listed in alphabetical order.)	Thailand U-23	Olympic Stadium, Ashgabat
2002; Details	Torpedo Kutaisi (Georgia (country))	1 – 1 (4 – 2 pens.)	Turkmenistan	Flora Tallinn (Estonia)	1 – 0	Turkey U-21	Köpetdag Stadium, Ashgabat
2003; Details	Nisa Aşgabat (Turkmenistan)	1 – 0	Turkmenistan Olympic	Atlantas Klaipeda (Lithuania)	1 – 0	(Belarus) Neman Grodno	Köpetdag Stadium, Ashgabat
2004; Details	Nisa Aşgabat (Turkmenistan)	3 – 2	(Georgia (country)) Torpedo Kutaisi	Vorskla Poltava (Ukraine)	1 – 0	(Tajikistan) Aviator Chkalovsk	Köpetdag Stadium, Ashgabat
2005; Details	Nisa Aşgabat (Turkmenistan)	2 – 1	(Turkmenistan) Nebitçi Balkanabat	FC Parvoz (Tajikistan)	3 – 2	(Armenia) Mika Ashtarak	Köpetdag Stadium, Ashgabat
2006; Details	Dacia Chişinău (Moldova)	4 – 3	(Turkmenistan) HTTU Aşgabat	Vorskla Poltava (Ukraine)	1 – 1 (4 – 3 pens.)	(Uzbekistan) Traktor Tashkent	Köpetdag Stadium, Ashgabat
2007; Details	HTTU Aşgabat (Turkmenistan)	3 – 2	(Turkmenistan) FC Aşgabat	Vorskla Poltava (Ukraine)	0 – 0 (10 – 9 pens.)	(Kazakhstan) Ordabasy	Olympic Stadium, Ashgabat
2008; Details	HTTU Aşgabat (Turkmenistan)	2 – 1	(Turkmenistan) FC Aşgabat	Iran U-23	1 – 0	(Armenia) Mika Ashtarak	Olympic Stadium, Ashgabat
2009; Details	HTTU Aşgabat (Turkmenistan)	1 – 0	(Latvia) Skonto Rīga	FC Aşgabat (Turkmenistan)	1 – 1	(Armenia) FC Gandzasar	Olympic Stadium, Ashgabat
2010; Details	Altyn Asyr (Turkmenistan)	1 – 0	(Turkmenistan) Nebitçi	Turkey U-21	3 – 0	(Kazakhstan) Okzhetpes	Olympic Stadium, Ashgabat
