= 2010 Turkmenistan President's Cup =

2010 Turkmenistan President’s Cup
Prezident Kubogy 2010

Tournament details
- Host country: Turkmenistan
- Dates: 20 February - 28 February
- Teams: 8 (from 2 confederations)
- Venue(s): 2 (in 2 host cities)

Final positions
- Champions: (Turkmenistan) Altyn Asyr
- Runners-up: (Turkmenistan) Nebitçi
- Third place: Turkey U-21
- Fourth place: (Kazakhstan) Okzhetpes

Tournament statistics
- Matches played: 16
- Goals scored: 30 (1.88 per match)
- Top scorer(s): Arif Mirzoýew (6 goals)
- Best player(s): Ahmet Allaberdiýew (Altyn Asyr)

Eight teams from seven countries will participate in the 16th edition of the Turkmenistan President's Cup, which will take place in Ashgabat's Olympic Stadium between February 20 and 28. The group toppers clash in the final and stand to win $20,000 while the runners-up get half that amount. The third-placed team will receive $5,000.

== Participating teams ==
Team	Qualifying method
(Turkmenistan) Nebitçi Balkanabat	Ýokary Liga 2009 runners-up
(Turkmenistan) FC Altyn Asyr	Turkmenistan Cup 2009 winners
(Kyrgyzstan) FC Abdysh-Ata	Kyrgyzstan League 2009 runners-up
(Lithuania) FK Ekranas	A Lyga 2009 winners
(Tajikistan) Vakhsh Qurghonteppa	Tajik League 2009 winners
(Armenia) FC Gandzasar	Armenian Premier League 2009 5th place
(Kazakhstan) FC Okzhetpes	2009 Kazakhstan Premier League 11th place
Turkey Amateur	

== Group stage ==
All times are local (UTC+5)

=== Group A ===
Team	Pld	W	D	L	GF	GA	GD	Pts
(Turkmenistan) FC Altyn Asyr	3	3	0	0	7	1	+6	9
Turkey Amateur	3	1	1	1	4	3	+1	4
(Tajikistan) Vakhsh Qurghonteppa	3	1	0	2	2	5	-3	3
(Armenia) FC Gandzasar	3	0	1	2	2	6	-4	1

==== Results ====
20 February 2010
15:00

FC Altyn Asyr (Turkmenistan)	2 - 0	(Tajikistan) Vakhsh Qurghonteppa
Baýlyýew 28'; Mirzoýew 80' (pen.)

Olympic Stadium, Ashgabat
20 February 2010
18:00

Turkey Amateur	1 - 1	(Armenia) FC Gandzasar
Yarkın 8'		Khanishvili 68'

Olympic Stadium, Ashgabat

22 February 2010
15:00

Vakhsh Qurghonteppa (Tajikistan)	0 - 2	Turkey Amateur
		Köse 8'; Yarkın 36'

Olympic Stadium, Ashgabat
22 February 2010
18:00

FC Altyn Asyr (Turkmenistan)	3 - 0	(Armenia) FC Gandzasar
Gurbani 48'; Mirzoýew 57', 77'

Olympic Stadium, Ashgabat

24 February 2010
15:00

FC Gandzasar (Armenia)	1 - 2	(Tajikistan) Vakhsh Qurghonteppa
Oseyan 7'		Sharipov 25'; Usmonov 75'

Olympic Stadium, Ashgabat
24 February 2010
18:00

Turkey Amateur	1 - 2	(Turkmenistan) FC Altyn Asyr
Akman 8'		Mirzoýew 13', 44' (pen.)

Olympic Stadium, Ashgabat

=== Group B ===
Team	Pld	W	D	L	GF	GA	GD	Pts
(Turkmenistan) Nebitçi Balkanabat	3	2	0	1	2	4	-2	6
(Kazakhstan) FC Okzhetpes	3	1	2	0	5	1	+4	5
(Lithuania) FK Ekranas	3	1	1	1	3	2	+1	4
(Kyrgyzstan) FC Abdysh-Ata	3	0	1	2	0	3	-3	1

==== Results ====
21 February 2010
14:00

FC Okzhetpes (Kazakhstan)	1 - 1	(Lithuania) FK Ekranas
Malakhovsky 50'		Markevičius 61'

Olympic Stadium, Ashgabat
21 February 2010
18:00

Nebitçi Balkanabat (Turkmenistan)	1 - 0	(Kyrgyzstan) FC Abdysh-Ata
Boliýan 18'

Olympic Stadium, Ashgabat

23 February 2010
15:00

FK Ekranas (Lithuania)	2 - 0	(Kyrgyzstan) FC Abdysh-Ata
Bička 19'; Galkevičius 23'

Ahal Stadium, Abadan
23 February 2010
18:00

Nebitçi Balkanabat (Turkmenistan)	0 - 4	(Kazakhstan) FC Okzhetpes
		Nurgaliev 8'; Samokhin 78', 84'; Dyak 89'

Ahal Stadium, Abadan

25 February 2010
15:00

FC Abdysh-Ata (Kyrgyzstan)	0 - 0	(Kazakhstan) FC Okzhetpes

Ahal Stadium, Abadan
25 February 2010
18:00

FK Ekranas (Lithuania)	0 - 1	(Turkmenistan) Nebitçi Balkanabat
		Garahanow 56'

Ahal Stadium, Abadan

== Knockout stage ==
Semi-finals
26 February - Olympic Stadium
(Turkmenistan) FC Altyn Asyr	1
(Kazakhstan) FC Okzhetpes	0
26 February - Olympic Stadium
(Turkmenistan) Nebitçi Balkanabat (p)	0 (4)
Turkey Amateur	0 (3)

Final
28 February - Olympic Stadium
(Turkmenistan) FC Altyn Asyr	1
(Turkmenistan) Nebitçi Balkanabat	0
Third place
28 February - Olympic Stadium
(Kazakhstan) FC Okzhetpes	0
Turkey Amateur	3

== Semi finals ==
26 February 2010
15:00

FC Altyn Asyr (Turkmenistan)	1 - 0	(Kazakhstan) FC Okzhetpes
Tagaýew 68'

Olympic Stadium, Ashgabat

26 February 2010
18:00

Nebitçi Balkanabat (Turkmenistan)	0 - 0	Turkey Amateur
Penalties
	4 – 3

Olympic Stadium, Ashgabat

Finals

28 February 2010

Altyn Asyr Aşgabat [TKM] 1-0 Nebitçi Balkanabat [TKM] [Arif Mirzoýew 40]

== Third-place play-off ==
28 February 2010
14:00

FC Okzhetpes (Kazakhstan)	0 - 3	Turkey Amateur
		Köse

Olympic Stadium, Ashgabat

== Final ==
28 February 2010
17:00

FC Altyn Asyr (Turkmenistan)	1 - 0	(Turkmenistan) Nebitçi Balkanabat
Mirzoýew 40'

Olympic Stadium, Ashgabat
Attendance: 15.000

== Top scorers ==
Rank	Scorer	Club	Goals
1	(Turkmenistan) Arif Mirzoýew	FC Altyn Asyr	6 (2)
2	(Kazakhstan) Evgeny Samokhin	FC Okzhetpes	2
2	(Turkey) Bahattin Köse	Rot Weiss Ahlen	2
2	(Turkey) Çağrı Yarkın	Çaykur Rizespor	2
5	(Armenia) Artak Oseyan	FC Gandzasar	1
5	(Armenia) David Khanishvili	FC Gandzasar	1
5	(Kazakhstan) Ermek Nurgaliev	FC Okzhetpes	1
5	(Russia) Maksim Malakhovsky	FC Okzhetpes	1
5	(Kazakhstan) Yuri Dyak	FC Okzhetpes	1
5	(Lithuania) Deimantas Bička	FK Ekranas	1
5	(Lithuania) Dominykas Galkevičius	FK Ekranas	1
5	(Lithuania) Tadas Markevičius	FK Ekranas	1
5	(Tajikistan) Bahadur Sharipov	Vakhsh Qurghonteppa	1
5	(Tajikistan) Rustam Usmonov	Vakhsh Qurghonteppa	1
5	(Turkey) Hakan Akman	Samsunspor	1
5	(Turkmenistan) Aleksandr Boliýan	Nebitçi Balkanabat	1
5	(Turkmenistan) Amir Gurbani	FC Altyn Asyr	1
5	(Turkmenistan) Elman Tagaýew	FC Altyn Asyr	1
5	(Turkmenistan) Geldimyrat Garahanow	Nebitçi Balkanabat	1
5	(Turkmenistan) Myratberdi Baýlyýew	FC Altyn Asyr	1
