= 2002 Turkmenistan President's Cup =

VIII Turkmenistan President's Cup (2002)

== Group A ==
Team	Pld	W	D	L	GF	GA	GD	Pts
Turkmenistan	3	2	1	0	9	1	+8	7
Turkey U-21	3	2	0	1	5	5	0	6
(Uzbekistan) FJ Buxoro	3	1	0	2	2	7	-5	3
(Russia) Torpedo Moskva	3	0	1	2	2	5	-3	1

11 February 2002
Torpedo Moskva	0–1	FJ Buxoro
Turkmenistan	3–0	Turkey U-21
13 February 2002
Turkey U-21	2–1	FJ Buxoro
Turkmenistan	1–1	Torpedo Moskva
15 February 2002
Turkey U-21	3–1	Torpedo Moskva
Turkmenistan	5–0	FJ Buxoro

== Group B ==
Team	Pld	W	D	L	GF	GA	GD	Pts
(Georgia (country)) Torpedo Kutaisi	3	1	2	0	2	1	+1	5
(Estonia) Flora Tallinn	3	1	2	0	2	1	+1	5
(Lithuania) Atlantas Klaipeda	3	1	1	1	3	2	+1	4
(Ukraine) CSCA Kyiv	3	0	1	2	3	6	-3	1

12 February 2002
Torpedo Kutaisi	0–0	Flora Tallinn
CSCA Kyiv	1–3	Atlantas Klaipeda
14 February 2002
Torpedo Kutaisi	2–1	CSCA Kyiv
Atlantas Klaipeda	0–1	Flora Tallinn
16 February 2002
Torpedo Kutaisi	0–0	Atlantas
Flora Tallinn	1–1	CSCA Kyiv

Third Place

2002-02-18

Turkey U-21	0 - 1	(Estonia) Flora Tallinn
		Aivar Anniste 56'

== Final ==
2002-02-19

Torpedo Kutaisi (Georgia (country))	1 - 1	Turkmenistan
Mikheil Makhviladze 71'		Azat Guljagazow 90'
Penalties
Valeri Abramidze (penalty scored); Vakhtang Khvadagiani (penalty scored); Mikheil Makhviladze (penalty scored); Givi Didava (penalty scored)	4 – 2	(penalty scored) Didargylyç Urazow; (penalty scored) Juma Meredow; (penalty missed) Arsen Bagdasaryan; (penalty missed) Boris Borovik
