= Sezer Özmen =

Turkish footballer (born 1992)

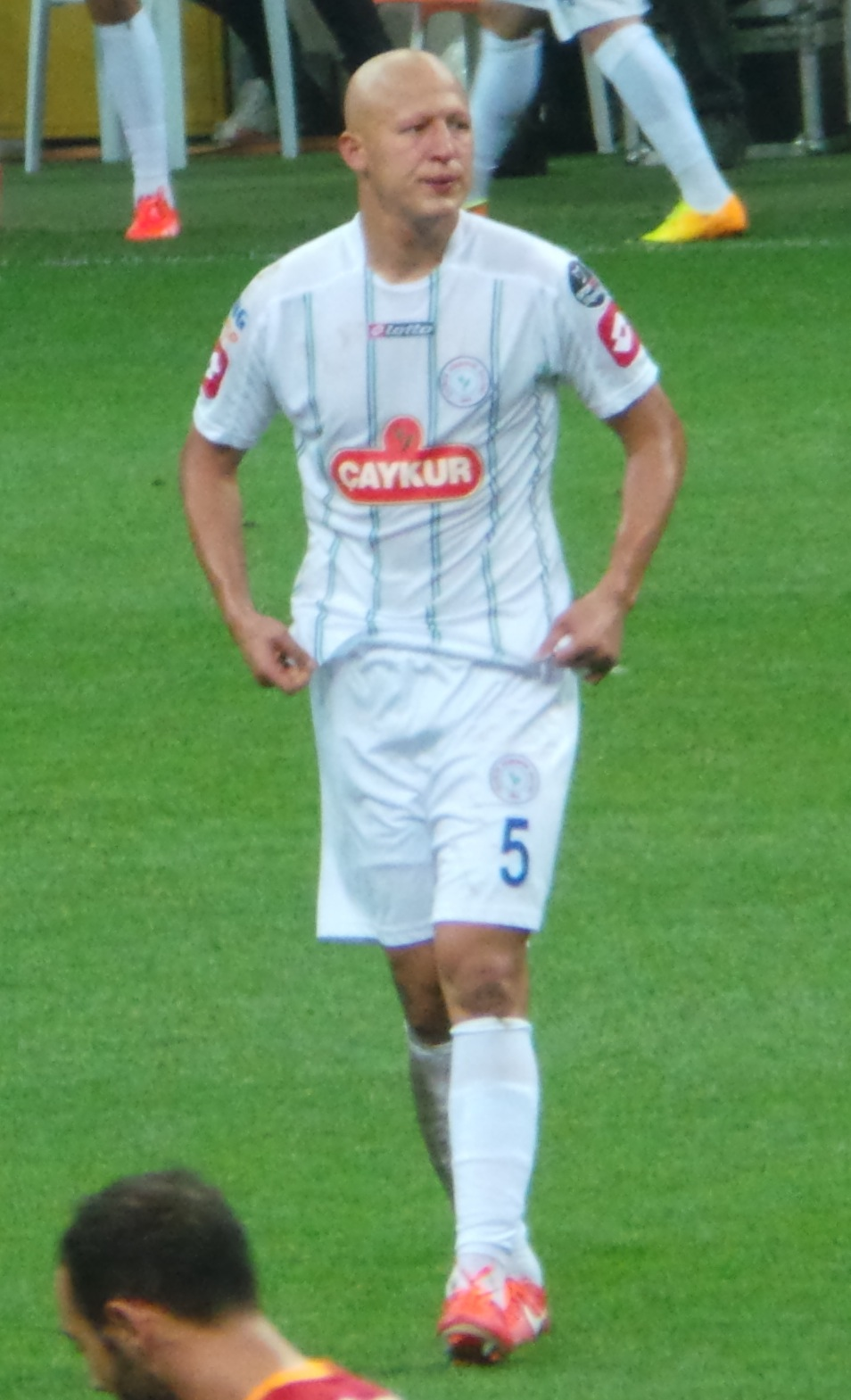
- Özmen with Çaykur Rizespor in September 2013

Personal information
- Date of birth: 7 July 1992 (age 34)
- Place of birth: Bakırköy, Istanbul, Turkey
- Height: 1.89 m (6 ft 2 in)
- Position: Defender

Team information
- Current team: Fethiyespor
- Number: 92

Youth career
- 2005–2006: Bakırköyspor
- 2006–2010: Beşiktaş

Senior career*
Years	Team	Apps	(Gls)
2010–2012	Beşiktaş	0	(0)
2010–2012	→ Çaykur Rizespor (loan)	44	(2)
2012–2015	Çaykur Rizespor	39	(0)
2015	→ Samsunspor (loan)	21	(2)
2015–2016	Metz	7	(0)
2016	Alanyaspor	17	(0)
2017	Yeni Malatyaspor	10	(0)
2017–2020	Adana Demirspor	24	(2)
2019	→ Ümraniyespor (loan)	0	(0)
2019–2020	→ Balıkesirspor (loan)	19	(2)
2020–2021	Hekimoğlu Trabzon	9	(1)
2021	→ Turgutluspor (loan)	6	(0)
2021–2022	Etimesgut Belediyespor	39	(0)
2023–	Fethiyespor	21	(1)

International career
2008–2009	Turkey U17	9	(0)
2009–2010	Turkey U18	8	(0)
2010–2011	Turkey U19	13	(0)
2011–2013	Turkey U21	10	(0)
- * Club domestic league appearances and goals as of 23 September 2023

Sezer Özmen (born 7 July 1992) is a Turkish professional footballer who plays as a defender for Fethiyespor.

== Career ==
Özmen left FC Metz in the winter 2015.
