= Mehmet Sıddık İstemi =

Turkish footballer (born 1991)

Mehmet Siddik Istemi
Personal information
- Date of birth: 20 April 1991 (age 35)
- Place of birth: Diyarbakir, Turkey
- Height: 1.76 m (5 ft 9 in)
- Position: Midfielder

Team information
- Current team: Erbaaspor
- Number: 21

Senior career*
Years	Team	Apps	(Gls)
2009–2011	Diyarbakırspor	16	(0)
2011–2014	1461 Trabzon	76	(1)
2014–2015	Karşıyaka	27	(1)
2015–2016	Şanlıurfaspor	8	(0)
2016–2019	Amed	109	(16)
2019–2020	Vanspor FK	27	(3)
2020–2021	Pendikspor	16	(5)
2021–2022	Amed	27	(3)
2022–2024	Etimesgut Belediyespor	65	(14)
2024	Sebat Gençlikspor	12	(1)
2024–	Erbaaspor	43	(10)
- * Club domestic league appearances and goals as of 8 November 2025

Mehmet Siddik Istemi (born 20 April 1991) is a Turkish footballer who plays as a midfielder for TFF 2. Lig club Erbaaspor.
