= 2006 Turkmenistan President's Cup =

XII Turkmenistan President Cup (2006)

All matches played at Köpetdag Stadium, Ashgabat.

== Group A ==
Team	Pld	W	D	L	GF	GA	GD	Pts
(Turkmenistan) HTTU Aşgabat	3	3	0	0	5	1	+4	9
(Uzbekistan) Traktor Tashkent	3	1	1	1	7	5	+2	4
(Turkmenistan) Nebitçi Balkanabat	3	1	1	1	5	4	+1	4
(Tajikistan) CSKA Dushanbe	3	0	0	3	0	7	−7	0

11 February 2006
HTTU Aşgabat	2–1	Traktor Tashkent
CSKA Dushanbe	0–2	Nebitçi Balkanabat
13 February 2006
Traktor Tashkent	3–3	Nebitçi Balkanabat
HTTU Aşgabat	2–0	CSKA Dushanbe
15 February 2006
CSKA Dushanbe	0–3	Traktor Tashkent
Nebitçi Balkanabat	0–1	HTTU Aşgabat

== Group B ==
Team	Pld	W	D	L	GF	GA	GD	Pts
(Moldova) FC Dacia Chişinău	3	2	1	0	4	2	+2	7
(Ukraine) Vorskla Poltava	3	1	2	0	2	0	+2	5
(Iran) Persepolis-Khorasan Mashad	3	0	2	1	2	3	−1	2
(Turkmenistan) Merw Mary	3	0	1	2	4	7	−3	1

12 February 2006
Merw Mary	2–3	Dacia Chişinău
Vorskla Poltava	0–0	Persepolis
14 February 2006
Dacia Chişinău	1–0	Persepolis
Merw Mary	0–2	Vorskla Poltava
16 February 2006
Vorskla Poltava	0–0	Dacia Chişinău
Persepolis	2–2	Merw Mary

Third Place

2006-02-18

Traktor Tashkent (Uzbekistan)	1 - 1	(Ukraine) Vorskla Poltava
Muqumjon Toshmatov 63'		90+1' Mykhailo Bondarenko
Penalties
Pavel Solomin (penalty scored); Muzaffar Umurzoqov (penalty scored); Numon Xasanov (penalty scored); Sergey Bakanov (penalty missed); Timur Ayzatullov (penalty missed)	3 – 4	(penalty scored) Oleksandr Polunytskyi; (penalty scored) Oleksandr Chyzhov; (penalty scored) Oleksandr Poliyanchuk; (penalty scored) Oleksiy Rotan; (penalty missed) Vladyslav Rudchenko

Köpetdag Stadium, Ashgabat

== Final ==
2006-02-19

HTTU Aşgabat (Turkmenistan)	3 - 4	(Moldova) FC Dacia Chişinău
Berdi Şamyradow 5' (pen.), 90+2' (pen.); Gahrymanberdi Çoňkaýew 10'		44'Aurel Druta; 55', 79' Andrei Martin; 76'Ruslan Rascu

Köpetdag Stadium, Ashgabat
Attendance: 15.000
