= Ramazan Çevik =

Belgian footballer

Personal information
- Date of birth: 1 April 1992 (age 34)
- Place of birth: Maaseik, Belgium
- Height: 1.84 m (6 ft 1/2 in)
- Position: Left winger

Team information
- Current team: Fethiyespor
- Number: 77

Youth career
- Verbroedering Maasmechelen
- Racing Genk
- Standard Liège

Senior career*
Years	Team	Apps	(Gls)
2012–2014	Standard Liège	0	(0)
2012–2013	→ Fortuna Sittard (loan)	28	(2)
2014–2015	Antalyaspor	6	(0)
2015	→ Hacettepe (loan)	8	(0)
2016–2017	Eyüpspor	46	(5)
2017–2018	Sakaryaspor	36	(2)
2018–2020	Samsunspor	38	(1)
2020–2021	Kocaelispor	13	(0)
2021–2022	Esenler Erokspor	17	(0)
2022–2023	Sarıyer	47	(4)
2023–2024	Fethiyespor	33	(4)
2024–2025	Arnavutköy Belediyespor	26	(2)
2025–	Fethiyespor	10	(1)

International career
2009–2010	Belgium U18	9	(2)
2010	Belgium U19	7	(0)
- * Club domestic league appearances and goals as of 9 November 2025

Ramazan Çevik (born 1 April 1992) is a Belgian professional footballer who plays as a winger for Turkish TFF Second League club Fethiyespor. He is of Turkish descent.
