= Adıyaman F.K. =

Turkish football club

Adıyaman
- Full name: Adıyaman Futbol Kulübü
- Founded: 1992; 33 years ago
- Ground: Adıyaman Atatürk Stadium; Adıyaman, Turkey
- Capacity: 8,596
- Chairman: Sait Aybak
- Manager: Reşat Zengin
- League: TFF Third League
- 2023–24: TFF Second League, 19th (relegated)
Home colours	Away colours

Adıyaman Futbol Kulübü is a sports club located in Adıyaman, Turkey.

== History ==
The club initially formed in 1992 under the name Adıyaman GAP Spor. Their journey began in youth competitions until 2012, when they stepped up to join the Adıyaman 2nd Amateur League. There, they clinched the championship, earning promotion to the 1st Amateur League. The following season, they secured the title once more, and after a 2–1 playoff victory against Adıyamanspor, they ascended to the Regional Amateur League, adopting the name Adıyaman 1954 Spor Kulübü.

In the 2017–18 season, they dominated their group, triumphing in a playoff match against Ağrı 1970 SK with a 3–1 scoreline, thus securing promotion to the TFF Third League. However, their stay was short-lived as they finished 16th in the subsequent season, resulting in relegation back to the Regional Amateur League. Undeterred, they embarked on an impressive journey, securing two consecutive promotions, which led them to the TFF Second League for the 2021–22 season, coinciding with a name change to Adıyaman Futbol Kulübü.

Following the 2023 Turkey–Syria earthquake, the club made the decision to withdraw from the remainder of the 2022–23 season. In the 2023–24 season, Adıyaman FK finished in the 19th position and consequently being relegated to the TFF Third League. Finishing as 16th in the TFF Third League Group II the club relegated once more in the 2024–25 season.

== Honours ==
- TFF Third League
  - Winners: 2020–21
- Turkish Regional Amateur League
  - Winners: 2017–18
- Adıyaman 1st Amateur League:
  - Winners: 2013–14, 2014–15
