= Hakan Canbazoğlu =

Turkish footballer

Personal information
- Date of birth: 28 November 1987 (age 38)
- Place of birth: Eminönü, Turkey
- Height: 1.87 m (6 ft 2 in)
- Position: Goalkeeper

Team information
- Current team: Fethiyespor
- Number: 25

Youth career
- 2006–2012: Tuna Spor
- 2002–2006: Galatasaray
- 2006–2007: Sivasspor

Senior career*
Years	Team	Apps	(Gls)
2007–2008	Orhangazispor	59	(0)
2008–2010	Gölcükspor	2	(0)
2010–2012	Nazilli Belediyespor	69	(0)
2012–2013	Başakşehir	0	(0)
2013–2014	Nazilli Belediyespor	0	(0)
2014	Gaziosmanpaşaspor	10	(0)
2014–2016	Osmanlıspor	2	(0)
2016–2017	Yeni Malatyaspor	13	(0)
2017–2019	Erzurumspor	28	(0)
2019–2020	Boluspor	12	(0)
2020–2021	Şanlıurfaspor	27	(0)
2022–2024	Elazığspor	64	(0)
2024–2025	Karşıyaka	30	(0)
2025–	Fethiyespor	4	(0)

International career
2005	Turkey U19	3	(0)
- * Club domestic league appearances and goals as of 5 October 2025

Hakan Canbazoğlu (born 28 November 1987) is a Turkish professional footballer who plays as a goalkeeper for TFF 2. Lig club Fethiyespor.

== Professional career ==
A youth product of Galatasaray and Sivasspor, Canbazoğlu began his career with Orhangazispor. He had stints with Gölcükspor, Nazilli Belediyespor, Başakşehir, Nazilli Belediyespor and Gaziosmanpaşaspor in the Turkish semi-pro leagues. He transferred to Osmanlıspor, where he made his professional debut in a 1-0 Süper Lig loss to Çaykur Rizespor on 22 November 2015. He transferred to Yeni Malatyaspor, before returning to the Süper Lig with Erzurumspor. He followed that up with stints at Boluspor and Şanlıurfaspor.
