= Murat Torun =

Turkish footballer (born 1994)

Personal information
- Date of birth: 27 May 1994 (age 32)
- Place of birth: Bakırköy, Turkey
- Height: 1.85 m (6 ft 1 in)
- Position: Forward

Team information
- Current team: Denizli İdman Yurdu SK
- Number: 9

Senior career*
Years	Team	Apps	(Gls)
2012–2017	Orduspor	74	(13)
2013–2014	→ Trabzon Akçaabat (loan)	23	(7)
2014	→ Bayrampaşa (loan)	3	(0)
2017–2020	24 Erzincanspor	7	(0)
2018	→ Kozan Belediyespor (loan)	16	(6)
2018–2019	→ Sultanbeyli Belediyespor (loan)	8	(0)
2019	→ Erbaaspor (loan)	13	(0)
2020	→ Altındağ Belediyespor (loan)	8	(2)
2020–2021	Manisaspor	11	(2)
2021	Arnavutköy Belediyespor	11	(2)
2021–2022	Gümüşhanespor	13	(3)
2022	Siirt İl Özel İdaresi SK	17	(3)
2022–2023	Ağrı 1970 SK	18	(3)
2023	Edirnespor	15	(3)
2023–2024	Elazığspor	22	(0)
2024–2025	Uşakspor	16	(5)
2025	Bayburt Öİ	10	(1)
2025–	Denizli İdman Yurdu SK	10	(7)
- * Club domestic league appearances and goals as of 29 November 2025

Murat Torun (born 27 May 1994) is a Turkish footballer who plays as a forward for TFF 3. Lig club Denizli İdman Yurdu SK. He made his Süper Lig debut against Kasımpaşa on 24 November 2012.
