= 2008 Turkmenistan President's Cup =

The XIV Turkmen President’s Cup took place in Ashgabat beginning February 21, 2008. All matches played at Nisa-Çandybil and Olympic stadium, in Turkmenistan.

== Group stage ==
=== Group A ===
Team	Pts	Pld	W	D	L	GF	GA	GD
1. (Armenia) Mika FC	4	2	1	1	0	2	0	+2
2. (Turkey) Turkish collective	4	2	1	1	0	1	0	-1
3. (Turkmenistan) Şagadam Türkmenbaşy	0	2	0	0	2	0	3	-3

Mika FC	0–0	Turkish collective
Şagadam	0–1	Turkish collective
Mika	2–0	Şagadam

=== Group B ===
Team	Pts	Pld	W	D	L	GF	GA	GD
1. (Turkmenistan) HTTU Aşgabat	6	2	2	0	0	3	1	+2
2. (Kyrgyzstan) Dordoi-Dynamo Naryn	1	2	0	1	1	2	3	-1
3. (Russia) Rubin-2	1	2	0	1	1	1	2	-1

Dordoi-Dynamo Naryn	1–2	HTTU Aşgabat
Rubin-2	0–1	HTTU Aşgabat
Dordoi-Dynamo Naryn	1–1	Rubin-2

=== Group C ===
Team	Pts	Pld	W	D	L	GF	GA	GD
1. (Turkmenistan) FC Aşgabat	9	3	3	0	0	5	1	+4
2. Iran U-23	6	3	2	0	1	5	1	+4
3. (Tajikistan) Vakhsh Qurghonteppa	3	3	1	0	2	3	6	-3
4. (Turkmenistan) Nebitçi Balkanabat	0	3	0	0	3	1	4	-3

Vakhsh	2–1	Nebitçi Balkanabat
FC Aşgabat	1–0	Iran U-23
Nebitçi Balkanabat	0–1	Iran U-23
FC Aşgabat	3–1	Vakhsh
Iran U-23	4–0	Vakhsh
FC Aşgabat	1–0	Nebitçi Balkanabat

== Elimination round ==
=== Semi-final ===
HTTU Aşgabat	1–0	Mika

=== 3rd place game ===
Iran U-23	1–0	Mika

=== Final ===
HTTU Aşgabat	2–1	FC Aşgabat

- HTTU kept hold of the Turkmenistan President’s Cup after coming from a goal down to defeat Turkmen league champions 2–1 in the final of the ten-team tournament.
- AFC President’s Cup qualifiers Ashgabat took the lead in the 13th minute through Arif Mirzoev but for the second successive final HTTU would come from behind to take the trophy.
- The Students, who twice fought back to defeat Aşgabat 3-2 and win the 2007 Turkmenistan President’s Cup, got on level terms when Perkhat Podarov equalised before Berdi Şamyradow scored three minutes into the second-half with the goal that gave HTTU the trophy and the US$20,000 winners’ cheque.
