= Muhammed Emin Yavaş =

Turkish footballer (born 2000)

Personal information
- Date of birth: 5 September 2000 (age 26)
- Place of birth: Erzurum, Turkey
- Height: 1.80 m (5 ft 11 in)
- Position: Midfielder

Team information
- Current team: Tokat Belediye Plevnespor
- Number: 5

Youth career
- 2013–2016: Şenkayaspor
- 2016–2017: Harbişspor
- 2017–2019: Palandöken Belediyespor
- 2019–2021: Yeni Malatyaspor

Senior career*
Years	Team	Apps	(Gls)
2021–	Erzurumspor	17	(0)
2021	→ İskenderunspor (loan)	14	(0)
2022–2023	→ Ağrı 1970 (loan)	26	(0)
2024–	→ Tokat Belediye Plevnespor (loan)	8	(1)
- * Club domestic league appearances and goals as of 26 October 2024

Muhammed Emin Yavaş (born 5 September 2000) is a Turkish professional footballer who plays as a midfielder for TFF Third League club Tokat Belediye Plevnespor on loan from Erzurumspor.

== Professional career ==
Sert made his professional debut with Erzurumspor in a 4-1 Turkish Cup loss to Alanyaspor on 14 January 2021.
