= Mikheil Makhviladze =

Georgian footballer

Personal information
- Date of birth: 22 July 1978 (age 48)
- Place of birth: Tbilisi, Georgian SSR
- Height: 1.82 m (5 ft 11 1/2 in)
- Position: Defender

Team information
- Current team: FC Sioni Bolnisi

Senior career*
Years	Team	Apps	(Gls)
1995–1996	Rtsmena Kutaisi	13	(0)
1996–1997	FC Torpedo-2 Kutaisi	24	(0)
1997–1999	FC Samgurali Tskaltubo	37	(2)
1999–2004	FC Torpedo Kutaisi	126	(1)
2004–2005	FC Lokomotivi Tbilisi	46	(1)
2006	FC Dinamo Batumi	15	(1)
2006–2008	FC Olimpi Rustavi	48	(4)
2008–2009	Simurq PFC	25	(1)
2009–	FC Sioni Bolnisi		

International career
2001	Georgia	1	(0)
- * Club domestic league appearances and goals

Mikheil Makhviladze (born 22 July 1978 in Tbilisi) is a Georgian professional football player. Currently, he plays for FC Sioni Bolnisi.
