= Arsen Bagdasaryan =

Turkmenistan footballer

Personal information
- Date of birth: 11 March 1977 (age 49)
- Place of birth: Turkmenistan
- Height: 1.86 m (6 ft 1 in)
- Position: Defender

Senior career*
Years	Team	Apps	(Gls)
1996–1998	Kopetdag		
1997–2004	Nisa Asgabat		
2005	Gazcy Gazojak		
2006	Traktor Tashkent	6	(0)

International career
1999–2004	Turkmenistan	1	(0)
- * Club domestic league appearances and goals

Arsen Bagdasaryan is a Turkmenistani football defender who played for Turkmenistan in the 2004 Asian Cup. He also played for Köpetdag Aşgabat, Nisa Asgabat, Gazcy Gazojak.
