= Ensar Arslan =

German footballer

Personal information
- Date of birth: 1 August 2001 (age 25)
- Place of birth: Darmstadt, Germany
- Height: 1.83 m (6 ft 0 in)
- Position: Winger

Team information
- Current team: Hatayspor
- Number: 10

Youth career
- –2010: Viktoria Griesheim
- 2010–2012: Darmstadt 98
- 2012–2014: Eintracht Frankfurt
- 2014–2020: Darmstadt 98

Senior career*
Years	Team	Apps	(Gls)
2020–2022	Darmstadt 98	4	(0)
2022–2023	Samsunspor	6	(0)
2022–2023	→ Kırklarelispor (loan)	21	(1)
2023–2025	Yeni Mersin İdmanyurdu	19	(2)
2026–	Hatayspor	11	(3)
- * Club domestic league appearances and goals as of 1 October 2026

Ensar Arslan (born 1 August 2001) is a German professional footballer who plays as a winger for TFF 2. Lig club Hatayspor.

== Career ==
Arslan made his professional debut for Darmstadt 98 in the 2. Bundesliga on 18 June 2020, coming on as a substitute in the 86th minute for Nicolai Rapp in the 0–1 away loss against Arminia Bielefeld.

On 8 February 2022, Arslan signed a 3.5-year contract with Samsunspor in Turkey.

== Personal life ==
Arslan is of Turkish descent.
