= Furkan Polat =

Turkish footballer

Personal information
- Date of birth: 20 April 1998 (age 28)
- Place of birth: Kocasinan, Turkey
- Height: 1.84 m (6 ft 0 in)
- Position: Midfielder

Team information
- Current team: Kücükcekmece Sinop Spor

Youth career
- 2007–2010: Şimşekspor
- 2010: BAKspor
- 2010: Osmanlıspor
- 2010–2011: BAKspor
- 2011–2017: Osmanlıspor

Senior career*
Years	Team	Apps	(Gls)
2017–2019	Dardanelspor	33	(2)
2019–2021	Kayserispor	4	(0)
2020–2021	→ Kırşehir Belediyespor (loan)	20	(2)
2021–2022	Vanspor	35	(4)
2022–2023	Etimesgut Belediyespor	28	(1)
2023–	Kücükcekmece Sinop Spor	1	(0)
- * Club domestic league appearances and goals as of 23 September 2023

Furkan Polat (born 20 April 1998) is a Turkish professional footballer who plays as a midfielder for TFF Third League club Kücükcekmece Sinop Spor.

== Professional career ==
On 25 August 2019, Polat signed his first professional contract with Kayserispor for 5 years. Polat made his professional debut for Kayserispor in a 1-0 Süper Lig win over Çaykur Rizespor on 8 December 2019.
