= 2007 Turkmenistan President's Cup =

The 2007 Turkmenistan President's Cup was a tournament involving clubs from various countries of the region. Matches were played at Nisa Stadium and Olympic Stadium, Ashgabat.

== Format ==
From Group A, the winners proceed to the final, the runners-up to the third place match. The winners of Group B and C play each other for the spot in the final. The losers play for the third place.

== Group A ==
Team	Pld	W	D	L	GF	GA	GD	Pts
(Turkmenistan) FC Aşgabat	3	3	0	0	5	1	+4	9
(Ukraine) Vorskla Poltava	3	1	1	1	5	3	+2	4
(Thailand) FC PEA Bangkok	3	0	2	1	3	4	-1	2
(Tajikistan) Oriono Dushanbe	3	0	1	2	2	7	−5	0

22 February 2007
Vorskla Poltava	2–2	PEA Bangkok
FC Aşgabat	3–1	Oriono Dushanbe
24 February 2007
Vorskla Poltava	3–0	Oriono Dushanbe
FC Aşgabat	1–0	PEA Bangkok
26 February 2007
PEA Bangkok	1–1	Oriono Dushanbe
Vorskla Poltava	0–1	FC Aşgabat

== Group B ==
Team	Pld	W	D	L	GF	GA	GD	Pts
(Kazakhstan) FC Ordabasy	2	0	2	0	0	0	0	2
(Armenia) Gandzasar Kapan	2	0	2	0	0	0	0	2
(Turkmenistan) Nebitçi Balkanabat	2	0	2	0	0	0	0	2

23 February 2007
Nebitçi Balkanabat	0–0	Gandzasar
25 February 2007
Ordabasy	0–0	Nebitçi Balkanabat
26 February 2007
Gandzasar	0–0	Ordabasy

NB: The final places were drawn.

== Group C ==
Team	Pld	W	D	L	GF	GA	GD	Pts
(Turkmenistan) HTTU Aşgabat	2	2	0	0	6	0	+6	6
(Turkey) Amateur Team	2	1	0	1	2	3	-1	3
(Iran) FC Aboomoslem	2	0	0	2	0	5	-5	0

23 February 2007
HTTU Aşgabat	3–0	Aboomoslem
25 February 2007
HTTU Aşgabat	3–0	Amateur Team
26 February 2007
Aboomoslem	0–2	Amateur Team

== Play-off for the Final ==
2006-02-27

FC Ordabasy (Kazakhstan)	0 - 2	(Turkmenistan) HTTU Aşgabat
		25' Berdi Şamyradow; 65' Gahrymanberdi Çoňkaýew

Köpetdag Stadium, Ashgabat

== Third-place play-off ==
2006-02-18

Vorskla Poltava (Ukraine)	0 - 0	(Kazakhstan) FC Ordabasy
Penalties
	10 – 9

== Final ==
The 2007 Turkmenistan President’s Cup Final was played at Olympic Stadium, Ashgabat.

2006-02-19

FC Aşgabat (Turkmenistan)	3 - 4	(Turkmenistan) HTTU Aşgabat
Hamza Allamow 32', 57'		38'Guwanç Rejebow; 77' Berdi Şamyradow; 80'Mämmedaly Garadanow

Olympic Stadium, Ashgabat
