= Fethiyespor =

Turkish sports club

- Full name: Fethiye Spor Kulübü
- Founded: 1933; 93 years ago
- Ground: Fethiye İlçe Stadium, Fethiye, Muğla
- Capacity: 8,372
- Chairman: Esat Bakırcı
- Manager: Selahaddin Dinçel
- League: TFF 2. Lig
- 2025–26: TFF 2. Lig, Red, 13th of 18
- Website: www.fethiyespor.org
| Home colours | Away colours | Third colours |

Fethiyespor is a Turkish sports club based in Fethiye, Muğla.

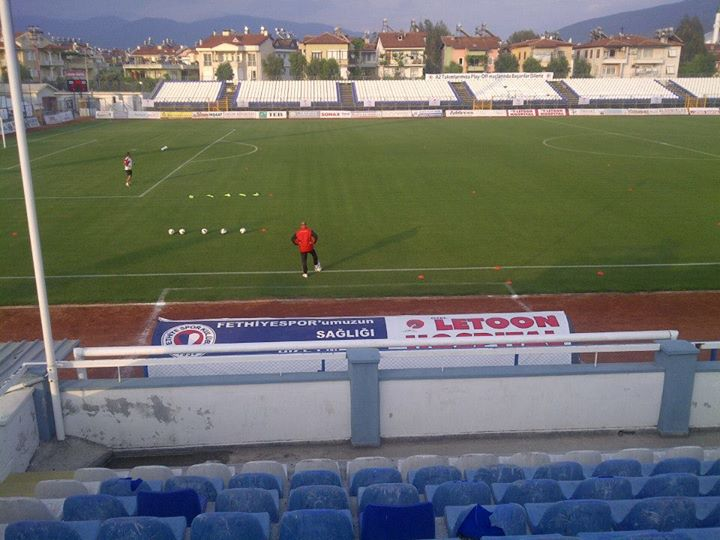
Fethiye Şehir Stadium

Fethiyespor were promoted to the Turkish Second Division in the 2005–06 season. In the 2011–12 football season, Fethiyespor reached the end of season promotion play-off games but lost their final match.

Fethiyespor were promoted to TFF League One after play-off games which concluded on 31 May 2013.

On 4 December 2013, Fethiyespor recorded perhaps the best result in their history when they knocked Fenerbahçe out of the Turkish Cup at Fenerbahçe's Şükrü Saracoğlu Stadium. Fenerbahçe were at the time were comfortable leaders of the Süper Lig. Onur Okan's header in the 77th minute, followed by a powerful shot from the same player six minutes later, was enough to shock the hosts with a 1–2 scoreline.

== League participations ==
- TFF First League: 1995–1996, 2013–2014
- TFF Second League: 2006–2013, 2014–2019, 2022–
- TFF Third League: 1984–1995, 1996–2006, 2019–2022
- Turkish Amateur League: 1933–1984

== Honours ==
TFF 2. Lig

Play-off Winners (1): 2012–13

TFF 3. Lig

Winners (1): 1994–95
Play-off Winners (1): 2021–22
Runners-up (1): 2005–06

== Current squad ==
As of 7 December 2025

Note: Flags indicate national team as defined under FIFA eligibility rules; some limited exceptions apply. Players may hold more than one non-FIFA nationality.

| No. | Pos. | Nation | Player |
|---|---|---|---|
| 1 | GK | TUR | Arda Akbulut |
| 4 | MF | TUR | Muhammed Gönülaçar |
| 5 | DF | TUR | Şahan Akyüz |
| 7 | FW | TUR | Bera Çeken |
| 8 | MF | TUR | Serdar Ümit Deniz |
| 10 | MF | TUR | Serdarcan Eralp |
| 11 | FW | TUR | Mehmet Kaan Türkmen |
| 14 | FW | TUR | Arda Yakup Yılmaz |
| 15 | DF | TUR | Oğuz Yılmaz |
| 16 | DF | TUR | Onur Atasayar |
| 17 | FW | TUR | Ahmet Mert Koşar (on loan from Pendikspor) |
| 18 | MF | TUR | Sabri Gülay |
| 19 | MF | TUR | Uğur Ayhan |
| 20 | FW | TUR | Nurettin Çakır |
| 23 | MF | TUR | Cihan Kazan |

| No. | Pos. | Nation | Player |
|---|---|---|---|
| 25 | GK | TUR | Hakan Canbazoğlu |
| 27 | FW | TUR | İbrahim Yüksel |
| 29 | DF | TUR | Berkay Can Değirmencioğlu |
| 34 | DF | TUR | Raşit Yöndem |
| 48 | FW | TUR | Kerem Pala |
| 52 | FW | TUR | Muhammet Enes Erdem |
| 53 | MF | TUR | Berat Satır |
| 61 | DF | TUR | Emre Bekir |
| 70 | DF | TUR | Samet Asatekin |
| 77 | DF | BEL | Ramazan Çevik |
| 78 | DF | TUR | Selim Kemençe |
| 79 | GK | TUR | Miraç Göktürk Özel |
| 88 | MF | TUR | Murat Çepel |
| 99 | DF | TUR | Ömer Faruk Kadimli |
| — | FW | TUR | Furkan Ceylan |

=== Out on loan ===
Note: Flags indicate national team as defined under FIFA eligibility rules; some limited exceptions apply. Players may hold more than one non-FIFA nationality.

| No. | Pos. | Nation | Player |
|---|---|---|---|
| — | DF | TUR | Yasin Cengiz (at Söke 1970 SK until 30 June 2026) |
| — | MF | TUR | Emre Özsarı (at Ağrı 1970 Spor until 30 June 2026) |

| No. | Pos. | Nation | Player |
|---|---|---|---|
| — | FW | TUR | Kayrahan Yılmaz (at Kahramanmaraşspor until 30 June 2026) |
