= 2005 Turkmenistan President's Cup =

The XI Turkmenistan President Cup took place in 2005.

All matches played at Köpetdag Stadium, Ashgabat.

== Group A ==
Team	Pld	W	D	L	GF	GA	GD	Pts
(Turkmenistan) Nebitçi Balkanabat	3	2	0	1	5	5	0	6
(Tajikistan) FC Parvoz	3	1	2	0	8	5	+3	5
(Ukraine) Vorskla Poltava	3	1	1	1	5	3	+2	4
Turkmenistan U23	3	0	1	2	1	6	-5	1

11 February 2005
Vorskla Poltava	3–0	Turkmenistan
Nebitçi	2–5	Parvoz
13 February 2005
Parvoz	1–1	Turkmenistan
Nebitçi	1–0	Vorskla Poltava
15 February 2005
Vorskla Poltava	2–2	Parvoz
Turkmenistan	0–2	Nebitçi

== Group B ==
Team	Pld	W	D	L	GF	GA	GD	Pts
(Turkmenistan) Nisa Aşgabat	3	2	0	1	6	3	+3	6
(Armenia) Mika Ashtarak	3	2	0	1	4	4	0	6
(Kazakhstan) FC Okzhetpes	3	1	1	1	4	4	0	4
(Uzbekistan) Navbahor Namangan	3	0	1	2	1	4	−3	1

12 February 2005
Okzhetpes	2–1	Nisa Aşgabat
Navbahor	0–1	Mika Ashtarak
14 February 2005
Navbahor	1–1	Okzhetpes
Mika Ashtarak	1–3	Nisa Aşgabat
16 February 2005
Okzhetpes	1–2	Mika Ashtarak
Nisa Aşgabat	2–0	Navbahor

Third Place

2005-02-18

FC Parvoz (Tajikistan)	3 - 2	(Armenia) Mika Ashtarak
Armen Petikyan 3'; Numon Hakimov 30'; Mansur Hakimov 61'		45', 56'Artyom Bernetsyan

Köpetdag Stadium, Ashgabat

== Final ==
2005-02-19

Nebitçi Balkanabat (Turkmenistan)	1 - 2	(Turkmenistan) Nisa Asgabat
Azat Purliyew 56'		35'Didargylyç Urazow; 55' Guwançmuhammet Öwekow

Köpetdag Stadium, Ashgabat
Attendance: 8.000
