= Sinan Uzun =

Turkish footballer

Personal information
- Date of birth: 25 January 1990 (age 36)
- Place of birth: Sinop, Turkey
- Height: 1.81 m (5 ft 11 in)
- Position: Forward

Team information
- Current team: Sinopspor

Youth career
- 2003–2007: erfelekspor
- 2007–2008: Balıkesirspor

Senior career*
Years	Team	Apps	(Gls)
2008–2016	Balıkesirspor	87	(24)
2012	→ Aydınspor 1923 (loan)	17	(10)
2012–2013	→ Aydınspor 1923 (loan)	31	(16)
2013–2014	→ Bergama Belediyespor (loan)	33	(12)
2015	→ BB Erzurumspor (loan)	11	(0)
2015–2016	→ Menemen Belediyespor (loan)	30	(5)
2016–2017	Zonguldak Kömürspor	26	(7)
2017–2018	Pazarspor	32	(11)
2018–2019	Kırşehir Belediyespor	31	(8)
2019	Ergene Velimeşe	15	(3)
2020	Nevşehir Belediyespor	7	(1)
2020–2022	Zonguldak Kömürspor	0	(0)
2022-2023	1868 boyabat	11	(3)
2023-	sinopspor		
- * Club domestic league appearances and goals

Sinan Uzun (born 25 January 1990 in Sinop) is a Turkish professional footballer who currently plays as a forward for Sinopspor.

He wears 57, the traffic code number for his birth city, Sinop.
