= İbrahim Kaya =

Turkish footballer

Personal information
- Full name: İbrahim Kaya
- Date of birth: March 9, 2001 (age 25)
- Place of birth: Avcılar, Turkey
- Height: 1.84 m (6 ft 1/2 in)
- Position: Attacking midfielder

Team information
- Current team: Alanyaspor
- Number: 27

Youth career
- 2012–2017: Kasımpaşa
- 2017–2018: Akhisarspor
- 2018–2022: İstanbulspor

Senior career*
Years	Team	Apps	(Gls)
2021–2022	İstanbulspor	0	(0)
2021–2022	→Ofspor (loan)	12	(2)
2022	→23 Elazığ FK (loan)	14	(2)
2022–2023	23 Elazığ FK (loan)	28	(7)
2023–2024	Erbaaspor	27	(10)
2024–2025	Bandırmaspor	32	(2)
2025–	Alanyaspor	30	(6)
- * Club domestic league appearances and goals as of 16:48, 16 August 2026 (UTC)

İbrahim Kaya (born 9 March 2001) is a Turkish footballer who plays as an attacking midfielder for the Süper Lig club Alanyaspor.

== Club career ==
Kaya is a product of the youth academies of the Turkish clubs Kasımpaşa, Akhisarspor and İstanbulspor. He began his senior career on successive loans with Ofspor and 23 Elazığ FK in the TFF Third League, before transferring to the latter in 2022. In 2023, he transferred to Erbaaspor and helped them earn promotion to the TFF Second League. He later joined TFF 1. Lig club Bandırmaspor, where they reached the playoff final and almost earned promotion.

On 2 July 2025, Kaya transferred to the Süper Lig club Alanyaspor on a 4-year contract.
