= Eren Kinali =

English footballer (born 2000)

Personal information
- Full name: Eren Kinali
- Date of birth: 24 February 2000 (age 26)
- Place of birth: Hackney, England
- Height: 5 ft 10 in (1.78 m)
- Position: Midfielder

Youth career
- Interwood
- –2019: Southend United

Senior career*
Years	Team	Apps	(Gls)
2019–2022	Southend United	8	(0)
2019	→ Royston Town (loan)	12	(4)
2021	→ Brightlingsea Regent (loan)	6	(2)
2021–2022	→ Hendon (loan)	19	(5)
2022–2023	Etimesgut Belediyespor	22	(3)
2023	→ İnegölspor (loan)	0	(0)
2023	→ Hacettepe 1945 SK (loan)	7	(0)
- * Club domestic league appearances and goals as of 20 May 2023

Eren Kinali (born 24 February 2000) is an English professional footballer who plays as a midfielder.

== Career ==
=== Youth and Southend United ===
Born in Hackney, Kinali played youth football for Interwood, before joining the academy of Southend United after impressing Southend after scoring a hat-trick in a trial match against them at under-15 level. In April 2016, Kinali was offered a scholarship at Southend United.

He joined Southern League Premier Division Central side Royston Town on loan in February 2019 and made his debut for the club in a 3–0 win against Banbury United the following day. He made 12 appearances for Royston, scoring four goals.

Kinali made his debut for Southend on 3 December 2019, coming on as a 76th-minute substitute for Brandon Goodship in a 1–1 draw away at Burton Albion. After six appearances for Southend United across the 2019–20 season, his contract was extended by one year in May 2020.

On 27 November 2021, he joined Southern League Premier Division South side Hendon on a one-month loan deal, going straight into the squad to face Walton Casuals.

In May 2022, Kinali was released by Southend United. On 24 July 2022, he joined TFF Second League side Etimesgut Belediyespor on a one-year deal with the option of a second.

== Personal life ==
Kinali is of Turkish descent, with family from the city of Kahramanmaraş.

== Career statistics ==
As of match played 23 April 2022

Club	Season	League			FA Cup		League Cup		Other		Total	
Club	Season	Division	Apps	Goals	Apps	Goals	Apps	Goals	Apps	Goals	Apps	Goals
Southend United	2018–19	League One	0	0	0	0	0	0	0	0	0	0
Southend United	2019–20	League One	6	0	0	0	0	0	0	0	6	0
Southend United	2020–21	League Two	2	0	0	0	1	0	1 (Note: Appearance(s) in EFL Trophy)	0	4	0
Southend United	2021–22	National League	0	0	0	0	0	0	0	0	0	0
Southend United	Total		8	0	0	0	1	0	1	0	10	0
Royston Town (loan)	2018–19	Southern League Premier Division Central	12	4	—		—		—		12	4
Brightlingsea Regent (loan)	2021–22	Isthmian League Premier Division	6	2	—		—		0	0	6	2
Hendon (loan)	2021–22	Southern League Premier Division South	19	5	—		—		—		19	5
Career total			45	11	0	0	1	0	1	0	47	11
