= Berkay Can Değirmencioğlu =

Turkish footballer

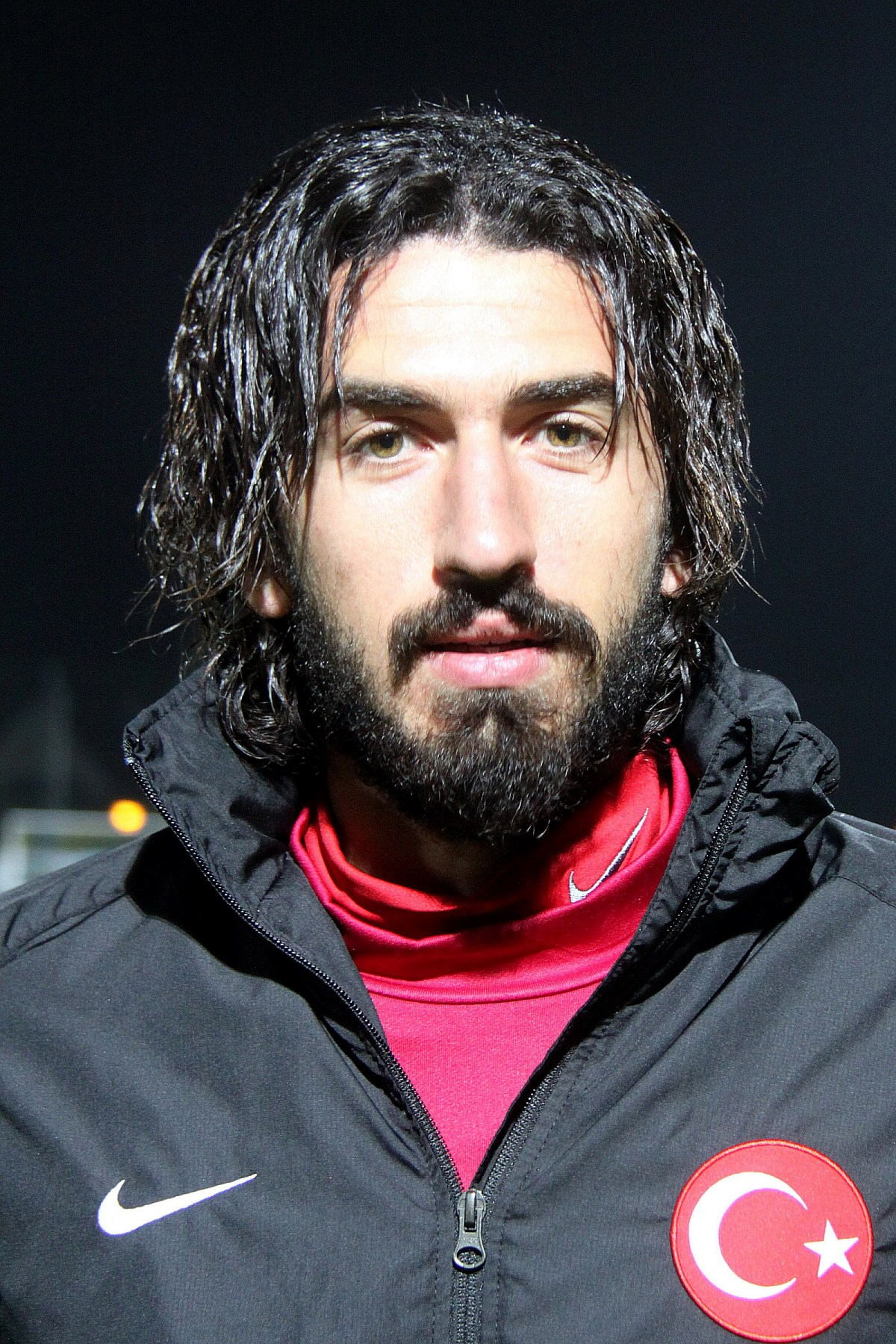

Personal information
- Date of birth: 12 January 1993 (age 33)
- Place of birth: Osmangazi, Turkey
- Height: 1.90 m (6 ft 3 in)
- Position: Defender

Team information
- Current team: Fethiyespor
- Number: 29

Youth career
- 2003–2007: Bursaspor
- 2007–2012: Fenerbahçe

Senior career*
Years	Team	Apps	(Gls)
2007–2017	Fenerbahçe	0	(0)
2012–2013	→ Denizlispor (loan)	27	(1)
2013–2014	→ Osmanlıspor (loan)	16	(2)
2014–2015	→ Kayserispor (loan)	11	(0)
2015–2016	→ Karşıyaka (loan)	17	(0)
2016–2017	→ Şanlıurfaspor (loan)	18	(1)
2017–2018	Bandırmaspor	27	(0)
2018–2021	Sakaryaspor	73	(4)
2021–2023	Çorum	41	(2)
2024	Amed	6	(0)
2024–	Fethiyespor	32	(1)

International career
2013	Turkey U20	1	(0)
2013	Turkey U21	2	(0)
- * Club domestic league appearances and goals as of 19 October 2025

Berkay Can Değirmencioğlu (born 12 January 1993) is a Turkish footballer who plays as a central defender for TFF 2. Lig club Fethiyespor.

Değirmencioğlu has represented the Turkish Football Federation at the U20 and U21 levels.
