= Etimesgutspor =

Turkish football club

- Full name: Etimesgut Spor Kulübü
- Founded: 1954
- Ground: Etimesgut Belediyesi Atatürk Stadyumu, Etimesgut / Ankara
- Capacity: 2,640
- Manager: Taşkın Güngör
- Website: https://etimesgutspor.org/
Home colours	Away colours

Etimesgut Spor Kulübü is a Turkish professional football club located in Ankara. The team currently competes in the TFF Third League.

== League participations ==
- TFF Third League: 2000–2001, 2014–present
- Turkish Regional Amateur League: 2013–2014

== Stadium ==
Currently the team plays at the 5,000-seat capacity Etimesgut Belediye Kemal Atatürk Stadı.

== Current squad ==
As of 26 December 2022

Note: Flags indicate national team as defined under FIFA eligibility rules; some limited exceptions apply. Players may hold more than one non-FIFA nationality.

No.	Pos.	Nation	Player
3	DF	TUR	Abdulcebrail Akbulut
5	DF	TUR	İsmail Güner
6	MF	TUR	Atamer Bilgin
7	FW	TUR	Rüstem Yiğit Yıkılmaz
8	MF	TUR	Berk Akgönül
9	FW	ENG	Eren Kinali
10	FW	TUR	Burak Çolak
11	DF	TUR	Efşan Geçgin
14	MF	TUR	Furkan Polat
17	FW	TUR	Yağız Suat Bolat
19	MF	TUR	Reşo Akın
21	FW	TUR	Mehmet Sıddık İstemi
22	GK	TUR	Mert Göktepe
23	DF	TUR	Sezer Özmen

No.	Pos.	Nation	Player
24	MF	TUR	Semih Üstün (on loan from Ankaraspor)
27	DF	TUR	Furkan Şeker
41	DF	TUR	Talha Özler
45	MF	TUR	Berke Gürbüz (on loan from Gaziantep)
53	DF	TUR	Aykut Civelek
60	FW	TUR	Turan Yılmaz
77	FW	USA	Burak Arda Bozdoğan
80	MF	TUR	Hamza Ok
83	MF	TUR	Furkan Berkay Uçar
88	DF	TUR	Gökhan Lale
97	FW	TUR	Muhammet Beşir
98	GK	TUR	Tugran Burak Tug
99	FW	TUR	Gülhan Üreyen

=== Out on loan ===
Note: Flags indicate national team as defined under FIFA eligibility rules; some limited exceptions apply. Players may hold more than one non-FIFA nationality.

No. / Pos. / Nation / Player; — / DF / GER / Koray Köysüren (at Kahramanmaraşspor until 30 June 2023)	No. / Pos. / Nation / Player; — / FW / TUR / Mehmet Han Küçük (at Kahramanmaraşspor until 30 June 2023)
