= 2004 Turkmenistan President's Cup =

X Turkmenistan President Cup (2004)

All matches played at Köpetdag Stadium, Ashgabat.

== Group A ==
Team	Pld	W	D	L	GF	GA	GD	Pts
(Georgia (country)) Torpedo Kutaisi	3	2	0	1	3	2	+1	6
(Ukraine) Vorskla Poltava	3	1	1	1	2	3	-1	4
(Iran) Aboomoslem	3	1	1	1	4	3	+1	4
(Turkmenistan) Nebitçi Balkanabat	3	0	2	1	3	4	-1	2

11 February 2004
Aboomoslem	0–1	Vorskla Poltava
Nebitçi	0–1	Torpedo
13 February 2004
Torpedo	2–0	Vorskla Poltava
Nebitçi	2–2	Aboomoslem
15 February 2004
Aboomoslem	2–0	Torpedo
Vorskla Poltava	1–1	Nebitçi

== Group B ==
Team	Pld	W	D	L	GF	GA	GD	Pts
(Turkmenistan) Nisa Aşgabat	3	2	1	0	5	1	+4	7
(Tajikistan) Aviator Chkalovsk	3	2	0	1	6	5	+1	6
(Russia) Lokomotiv Moskva	3	1	1	1	4	4	0	4
(Estonia) Tulevik Viljandi	3	0	0	3	1	6	−5	0

12 February 2004
Aviator	3–2	Lokomotiv
Nisa Aşgabat	2–0	Tulevik
14 February 2004
Lokomotiv	1–0	Tulevik
Nisa Aşgabat	2–0	Aviator
16 February 2004
Tulevik	1–3	Aviator
Lokomotiv	1–1	Nisa Aşgabat

Third Place

2004-02-17

Vorskla Poltava (Ukraine)	1 - 0	(Tajikistan) Aviator Chkalovsk
Petro Kondratyuk 27'

Köpetdag Stadium, Ashgabat

== Final ==
2004-02-19

Torpedo Kutaisi (Georgia (country))	2 - 3	(Turkmenistan) Nisa Aşgabat
Alexander Koshkadze 19'; Shota Darsadze 73'		56'Rejepmyrat Agabaýew pen' (76), pen' (81) Didargylyç Urazow

Köpetdag Stadium, Ashgabat
