= Mehmet Aygün =

- Born: 1956 (age 69–70); Giresun, Turkey
- Occupation: Restaurateur
- Known for: One of the popularizers of doner kebab in Germany

Mehmet Aygün (born in 1956) is a German-Turkish chief that known as one of the popularizers of doner kebab in Germany along with Kadir Nurman.

== Biography ==
Mehmet Aygün was born in 1956 in Giresun, Turkey. He was a fifth child in family and at an early age he began working in his father's workshop. In the late 1960s he and his family were moved in Germany.

He began to cook and sell food in one of the cafes in Kreuzberg when he was a 16 years old. And that's where together with Kadir Nurman he patented a special type of shawarma, also known as a «döner kebab» that was originally served on a plate, usually with rice and salad but without sauce. Later, it became as a fast-food.

In 1978 Mehmet Aygün opened his first restaurant «Hasır» that later became to Germany fast-food chain. As of 2018, there approximately eight branches in Berlin. Also Mehmet Aygün tried to open restaurant in Turkey, but he had failed.

In addition to his culinary career, Mehmet also worked in the hotel business. In the early 1990s he managed small hotels in Istanbul's Şişli district. In 2003 he expanded his operations and opened an all-inclusive theme hotel on Turkey's Mediterranean coast. From 1991 to 1996 he also served as president of football club Türkiyemspor Berlin.
