= Hakan Akman =

Turkish professional footballer

Personal information
- Date of birth: 9 October 1989 (age 37)
- Place of birth: Merzifon, Amasya, Turkey
- Height: 1.72 m (5 ft 8 in)
- Position: Forward

Team information
- Current team: Kahta 02 Spor

Youth career
- 2002–2008: Samsunspor

Senior career*
Years	Team	Apps	(Gls)
2008–2010	Samsunspor	31	(5)
2010–2011	Şanlıurfaspor	22	(2)
2011–2014	Diyarbakır BB	25	(2)
2014–2015	Tarsus	13	(0)
2015	Tokatspor	15	(2)
2015–2016	Kızılcabölükspor	35	(14)
2016–2017	Sakaryaspor	11	(0)
2017	→ Denizli Belediyespor (loan)	13	(4)
2017–2018	Sultanbeyli Belediyespor	32	(9)
2018–2019	Serik Belediyespor	3	(0)
2019	→ Ankara Adliyespor (loan)	17	(7)
2019	68 Aksaray Belediyespor	16	(7)
2020	Osmaniyespor FK	8	(1)
2020–	Kahta 02 Spor	0	(0)

International career
2007	Turkey U18	1	(0)
2008	Turkey U20	2	(0)
2009	Turkey U21	3	(0)
- * Club domestic league appearances and goals as of 15 March 2020

Hakan Akman (born 9 October 1989) is a Turkish professional footballer who plays as a forward for Kahta 02 Spor. Akman was also a youth international.
