= Bahattin Köse =

Turkish footballer

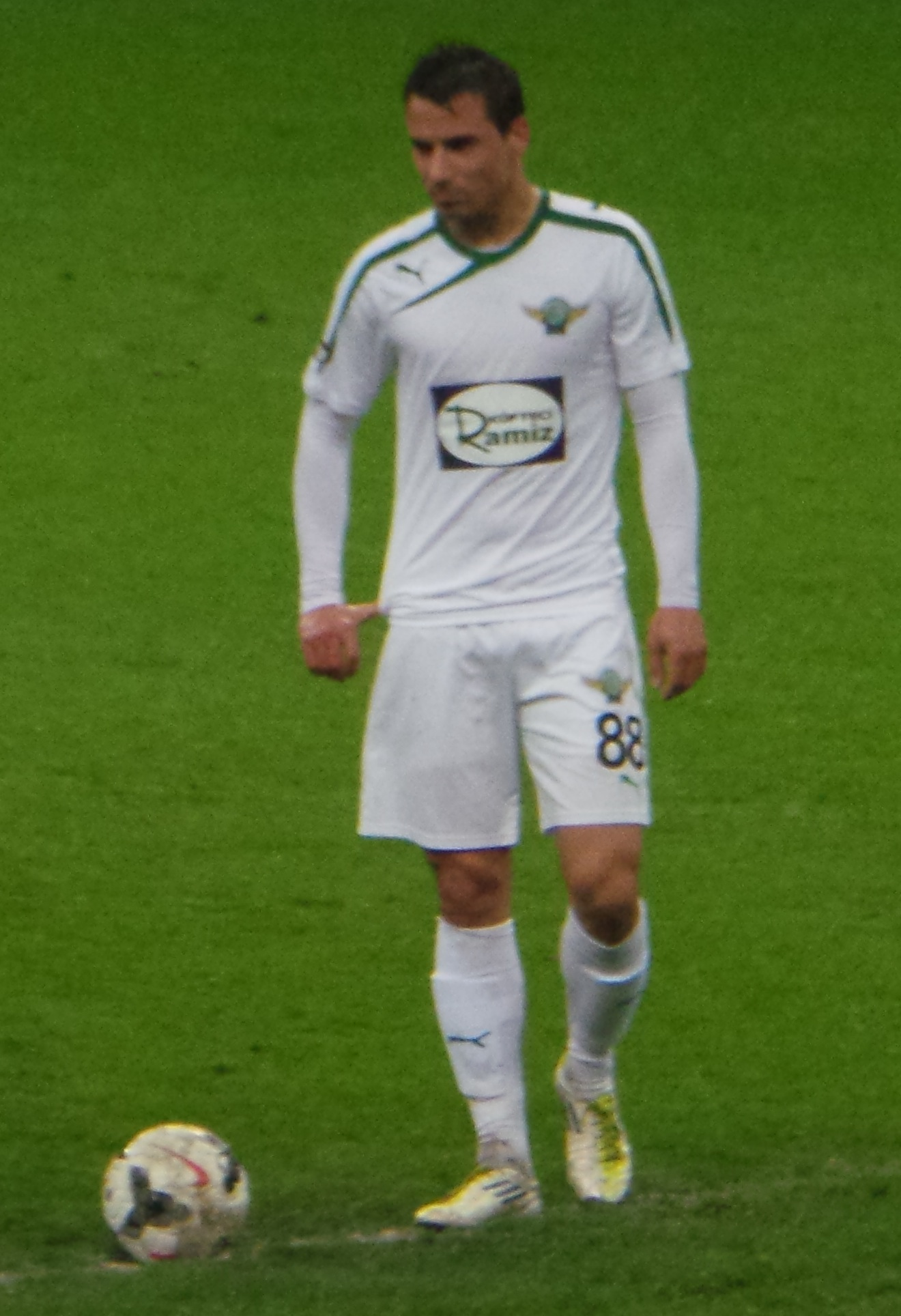
- Köse in 2014

Personal information
- Date of birth: 26 August 1990 (age 36)
- Place of birth: Ahlen, West Germany
- Height: 1.89 m (6 ft 2 in)
- Positions: Striker; right winger

Team information
- Current team: Rot Weiss Ahlen
- Number: 9

Youth career
- 1999–2008: TuS Wischerhöfen
- 2008–2009: Rot Weiss Ahlen

Senior career*
Years	Team	Apps	(Gls)
2009–2011	Rot Weiss Ahlen	7	(0)
2011–2012	Arminia Bielefeld	5	(0)
2012–2014	Mons	13	(0)
2014–2015	Akhisar Belediyespor	6	(0)
2015	→ Altınordu (loan)	6	(1)
2015–2017	Manisaspor	63	(24)
2017–2018	Adanaspor	32	(10)
2018–2020	Samsunspor	55	(33)
2020–2022	Kocaelispor	31	(3)
2022–2023	Ankaraspor	37	(12)
2023–2024	Elazığspor	27	(9)
2024–	Rot Weiss Ahlen	0	(0)
- * Club domestic league appearances and goals as of 27 April 2024

Bahattin Köse (born 26 August 1990) is a Turkish professional footballer who plays as a striker or right winger for German club Rot Weiss Ahlen.

== Career ==
Köse began his career with TuS Wischerhöfen and signed in summer 2008 for Rot Weiss Ahlen. He made his professional debut in a DFB-Pokal match on 22 September 2009 against SpVgg Greuther Fürth. On 6 October 2009, Köse signed his first professional contract. In summer 2011, he switched teams and joined Arminia Bielefeld.

In May 2012, Köse signed with R.A.E.C. Mons in the Belgian First Division A, on a two-year contract. He moved to Turkey for Süper Lig side Akhisar Belediyespor on 31 January 2014.
