= Ağrı 1970 S.K. =

Turkish football club

Ağrıspor
- Full name: Ağrı Spor Kulübü
- Founded: 1970; 56 years ago
- Ground: Vali Lütfü Yiğenoğlu Stadium
- Capacity: 10,000
- Chairman: Mehmet Yıldırım
- Coach: Mustafa Kalafatoğlu
- League: TFF 3. Lig
Home colours	Away colours

Ağrı Spor Kulübü, colloquially known as Ağrı or simply Ağrıspor, is a Turkish professional football club located in Ağrı. The club competes at TFF Third League as of 2021–22 season.

== Team records ==
=== League affiliation ===
- TFF Third League: 2019–
- Turkish Regional Amateur League: 2016–2019
- Super Amateur Leagues: 2015–2016

== Honours ==
- Turkish Regional Amateur League
  - Play-off winners: 2018–19
  - Group winners: 2017–18
- Super Amateur Leagues
  - Ağrı 1st Amateur League winners: 2015–16
