= 2000–01 Erzurumspor season =

Erzurumspor
2000–01 season
- Manager: Ruslan Abdullayev (until 21 August); Stanislav Karasi (from 6 September until 10 January); Celal Kıprızlı (from 31 January until 15 March); Behzat Çınar (from 15 March)
- Stadium: Cemal Gürsel Stadium
- 1.Lig: 17th (relegated)
- Turkish Cup: Third round
- Top goalscorer: League: Saša Kovačević (7); All: Saša Kovačević (7)
- Biggest win: Erzurumspor 5–0 Bursaspor
- Biggest defeat: Galatasaray 7–0 Erzurumspor

The 2000–01 season was Erzurumspor's 33rd season in existence and the club's third consecutive season in the top flight of Turkish football. In addition to the domestic league, Erzurumspor participated in this season's edition of the Turkish Cup. The season covered the period from July 2000 to 30 June 2001.

== Pre-season and friendlies ==
Win Draw Loss

== Competitions ==
=== Overview ===
Competition	First match	Last match	Starting round	Final position	Record							
Competition	First match	Last match	Starting round	Final position	Pld	W	D	L	GF	GA	GD	Win %
1.Lig	12 August 2000	25 May 2001	Matchday 1	17th	34	5	6	23	36	80	−44	14.71
Turkish Cup	29 November 2000		Third round	Third round	1	0	0	1	0	3	−3	0.00
Total					35	5	6	24	36	83	−47	14.29

Source: Competitions

=== 1.Lig ===
==== League table ====
Pos	Team	Pld	W	D	L	GF	GA	GD	Pts	Qualification or relegation
14	Bursaspor	34	11	7	16	55	60	−5	40	
15	Antalyaspor	34	9	9	16	45	64	−19	36	
16	Siirt Jet-PA Spor (R)	34	6	6	22	47	81	−34	24	Relegation to Turkish Second League Category A
17	Erzurumspor (R)	34	5	6	23	36	80	−44	21	Relegation to Turkish Second League Category A
18	Adanaspor (R)	34	2	10	22	51	91	−40	16	Relegation to Turkish Second League Category A

Rules for classification: 1) points; 2) goal difference; 3) number of goals scored.
(R) Relegated

==== Results summary ====
Overall								Home						Away					
Pld	W	D	L	GF	GA	GD	Pts	W	D	L	GF	GA	GD	W	D	L	GF	GA	GD
34	5	6	23	36	80	−44	21	4	3	10	21	26	−5	1	3	13	15	54	−39

Source: Flashscore

==== Results by round ====
Round	1	2	3	4	5	6	7	8	9	10	11	12	13	14	15	16	17	18	19	20	21	22	23	24	25	26	27	28	29	30	31	32	33	34
Ground	H	A	A	H	A	H	A	H	A	H	A	H	A	H	A	H	A	A	H	H	A	H	A	H	A	H	A	H	A	H	A	H	A	H
Result	L	L	L	W	D	W	L	L	D	L	L	L	L	W	L	D	L	L	L	D	L	L	L	L	W	W	L	L	L	D	D	L	L	L
Position	14	18	18	14	14	10	14	14	14	15	16	16	16	16	16	16	16	16	17	17	17	17	17	18	16	16	16	16	16	16	17	17	17	17

A = Away; H = Home; W = Win; D = Draw; L = Loss

==== Matches ====
12 August 2000 1	Erzurumspor	1–3	Trabzonspor	Erzurum
19:00				Stadium: Cemal Gürsel Stadium

19 August 2000 2	Galatasaray	7–0	Erzurumspor	Istanbul
19:00

26 August 2000 3	Denizlispor	3–1	Erzurumspor	Denizli
19:00

10 September 2000 4	Erzurumspor	5–0	Bursaspor	Erzurum
19:00				Stadium: Cemal Gürsel Stadium

16 September 2000 5	Samsunspor	2–2	Erzurumspor	Samsun
19:00

24 September 2000 6	Erzurumspor	1–0	Kocaelispor	Erzurum
19:00				Stadium: Cemal Gürsel Stadium

30 September 2000 7	İstanbulspor	1–0	Erzurumspor	Istanbul
19:00

15 October 2000 8	Erzurumspor	1–2	Gençlerbirliği	Erzurum
19:00				Stadium: Cemal Gürsel Stadium

21 October 2000 9	Siirt Jet-PA Spor	1–1	Erzurumspor	Siirt
14:00

28 October 2000 10	Erzurumspor	1–3	Beşiktaş	Erzurum
19:00				Stadium: Cemal Gürsel Stadium

5 November 2000 11	Yimpaş Yozgatspor	4–0	Erzurumspor	Yozgat
13:30

11 November 2000 12	Erzurumspor	0–1	Antalyaspor	Erzurum
13:00				Stadium: Cemal Gürsel Stadium

18 November 2000 13	Çaykur Rizespor	4–1	Erzurumspor	Rize
13:00

25 November 2000 14	Erzurumspor	2–0	Adanaspor	Erzurum
13:00				Stadium: Cemal Gürsel Stadium

3 December 2000 15	Fenerbahçe	4–2	Erzurumspor	Istanbul
19:00

10 December 2000 16	Erzurumspor	1–1	MKE Ankaragücü	Erzurum
13:00				Stadium: Cemal Gürsel Stadium

16 December 2000 17	Gaziantepspor	6–1	Erzurumspor	Gaziantep
13:30

21 December 2000 18	Trabzonspor	3–0	Erzurumspor	Trabzon
20:00

3 February 2001 19	Erzurumspor	1–2	Galatasaray	Erzurum
17:00				Stadium: Cemal Gürsel Stadium

11 February 2001 20	Erzurumspor	2–2	Denizlispor	Erzurum
13:30				Stadium: Cemal Gürsel Stadium

18 February 2001 21	Bursaspor	6–0	Erzurumspor	Bursa
13:30

25 February 2001 22	Erzurumspor	1–2	Samsunspor	Erzurum
13:30				Stadium: Cemal Gürsel Stadium

4 March 2001 23	Kocaelispor	1–0	Erzurumspor	İzmit
14:00

10 March 2001 24	Erzurumspor	1–3	İstanbulspor	Erzurum
14:00				Stadium: Cemal Gürsel Stadium

17 March 2001 25	Gençlerbirliği	1–2	Erzurumspor	Ankara
14:00

31 March 2001 26	Erzurumspor	2–1	Siirt Jet-PA Spor	Erzurum
15:00				Stadium: Cemal Gürsel Stadium

8 April 2001 27	Beşiktaş	2–0	Erzurumspor	Istanbul
19:00

15 April 2001 28	Erzurumspor	1–2	Yimpaş Yozgatspor	Erzurum
15:00				Stadium: Cemal Gürsel Stadium

22 April 2001 29	Antalyaspor	1–0	Erzurumspor	Antalya
15:00

28 April 2001 30	Erzurumspor	0–0	Çaykur Rizespor	Erzurum
16:30				Stadium: Cemal Gürsel Stadium

5 May 2001 31	Adanaspor	3–3	Erzurumspor	Adana
16:30	Işler 1', 88'; Şenyıldız 8'		Tokaç 27'; Yılmaz 76', 89'	Stadium: Adana 5 Ocak Stadium; Referee: Lale Orta

13 May 2001 32	Erzurumspor	1–2	Fenerbahçe	Erzurum
19:00	Yılmaz 42'		Mirković 54'; Rapaić 59'	Stadium: Cemal Gürsel Stadium; Referee: Musa Eryılmaz

19 May 2001 33	MKE Ankaragücü	5–2	Erzurumspor	Ankara
19:00	Özlem 28', 32', 80'; Kennedy 42'; Keleş 66'		Yılmaz 5'; Bayrak 35'	Stadium: Ankara 19 Mayıs Stadium; Referee: Metan Seval

25 May 2001 34	Erzurumspor	0–2	Gaziantepspor	Erzurum
20:00			Özer 38' (pen.); Yiğit 71'	Stadium: Cemal Gürsel Stadium; Referee: Bülent Uzun

=== Turkish Cup ===
29 November 2000 Third round	Diyarbakırspor	3–0	Erzurumspor	Diyarbakır
	Çelik 70'; Yıldırım 79', 87'			Stadium: Diyarbakır Atatürk Stadium; Referee: Sabit Haciömeroglu
