= 2000–01 Adanaspor season =

Adanaspor
2000–01 season
- Manager: Hikmet Karaman (until 7 December); Joachim Löw (from 20 December until 1 March)
- Stadium: Adana 5 Ocak Stadium
- 1.Lig: 18th (relegated)
- Turkish Cup: Fourth round
- Top goalscorer: League: Cenk İşler (19); All: Cenk İşler (19)
- Biggest win: İstanbulspor 1–6 Adanaspor
- Biggest defeat: Adanaspor 1–7 Trabzonspor

The 2000–01 season is Adanaspor's 57th season in existence and the club's third consecutive season in the top flight of Turkish football. In addition to the domestic league, Adanaspor participated in this season's edition of the Turkish Cup. The season covers the period from July 2000 to 30 June 2001. Adanaspor had a terribly unsuccessful season in the league, ending up at the very bottom with 20 points away from safety.

== Pre-season and friendlies ==
Win Draw Loss

== Competitions ==
=== Overview ===
Competition	First match	Last match	Starting round	Final position	Record							
Competition	First match	Last match	Starting round	Final position	Pld	W	D	L	GF	GA	GD	Win %
1.Lig	13 August 2000	25 May 2001	Matchday 1	18th	34	2	10	22	51	91	−40	5.88
Turkish Cup	29 November 2000	13 December 2000	Third round	Fourth round	2	1	0	1	7	5	+2	50.00
Total					36	3	10	23	58	96	−38	8.33

Source: Competitions

=== 1.Lig ===
==== League table ====
Pos	Team	Pld	W	D	L	GF	GA	GD	Pts	Qualification or relegation
14	Bursaspor	34	11	7	16	55	60	−5	40	
15	Antalyaspor	34	9	9	16	45	64	−19	36	
16	Siirt Jet-PA Spor (R)	34	6	6	22	47	81	−34	24	Relegation to Turkish Second League Category A
17	Erzurumspor (R)	34	5	6	23	36	80	−44	21	Relegation to Turkish Second League Category A
18	Adanaspor (R)	34	2	10	22	51	91	−40	16	Relegation to Turkish Second League Category A

Rules for classification: 1) points; 2) goal difference; 3) number of goals scored.
(R) Relegated

==== Results summary ====
Overall								Home						Away					
Pld	W	D	L	GF	GA	GD	Pts	W	D	L	GF	GA	GD	W	D	L	GF	GA	GD
34	2	10	22	51	91	−40	16	1	8	8	27	42	−15	1	2	14	24	49	−25

Source: Flashscore

==== Results by round ====
Round	1	2	3	4	5	6	7	8	9	10	11	12	13	14	15	16	17	18	19	20	21	22	23	24	25	26	27	28	29	30	31	32	33	34
Ground	A	A	A	H	A	H	H	H	H	A	H	A	H	A	H	A	H	H	H	H	A	H	A	A	A	A	H	A	H	A	H	A	H	A
Result	W	L	D	D	L	D	W	L	D	L	L	D	L	L	D	L	D	D	L	L	L	D	L	L	L	L	L	L	L	L	D	L	L	L
Position	1	8	8	10	11	12	10	12	12	12	14	13	14	15	15	15	15	15	15	15	16	16	16	16	17	17	17	17	18	18	18	18	18	18

A = Away; H = Home; W = Win; D = Draw; L = Loss

==== Matches ====
13 August 2000 1	İstanbulspor	1–6	Adanaspor	Istanbul
17:00

20 August 2000 2	Gençlerbirliği	1–0	Adanaspor
17:00

26 August 2000 3	Siirt Jet-PA Spor	2–2	Adanaspor	Siirt
17:00

8 September 2000 4	Adanaspor	1–1	Beşiktaş	Adana
20:00				Stadium: Adana 5 Ocak Stadium

17 September 2000 5	Yimpaş Yozgatspor	4–1	Adanaspor	Yozgat
16:00

23 September 2000 6	Adanaspor	1–1	Antalyaspor	Adana
19:00				Stadium: Adana 5 Ocak Stadium

1 October 2000 7	Adanaspor	1–0	Çaykur Rizespor	Adana
19:00				Stadium: Adana 5 Ocak Stadium

13 October 2000 8	Adanaspor	2–3	Denizlispor	Adana
20:00				Stadium: Adana 5 Ocak Stadium

20 October 2000 9	Adanaspor	1–1	Fenerbahçe	Adana
20:00				Stadium: Adana 5 Ocak Stadium

28 October 2000 10	Ankaragücü	4–0	Adanaspor	Ankara
13:30

5 November 2000 11	Adanaspor	0–1	Gaziantepspor	Adana
13:30				Stadium: Adana 5 Ocak Stadium

12 November 2000 12	Trabzonspor	3–3	Adanaspor	Trabzon
13:30

18 November 2000 13	Adanaspor	1–2	Galatasaray	Adana
19:00				Stadium: Adana 5 Ocak Stadium

25 November 2000 14	Erzurumspor	2–0	Adanaspor	Erzurum
13:00

3 December 2000 15	Adanaspor	1–1	Bursaspor	Adana
13:30				Stadium: Adana 5 Ocak Stadium

9 December 2000 16	Samsunspor	3–1	Adanaspor	Samsun
13:30

17 December 2000 17	Adanaspor	4–4	Kocaelispor	Adana
13:30				Stadium: Adana 5 Ocak Stadium

22 December 2000 18	Adanaspor	2–2	İstanbulspor	Adana
13:30				Stadium: Adana 5 Ocak Stadium

4 February 2001 19	Adanaspor	2–3	Gençlerbirliği	Adana
13:30				Stadium: Adana 5 Ocak Stadium

10 February 2001 20	Adanaspor	0–2	Siirt Jet-PA Spor	Adana
13:30				Stadium: Adana 5 Ocak Stadium

18 February 2001 21	Beşiktaş	2–1	Adanaspor	Istanbul
19:05

25 February 2001 22	Adanaspor	3–3	Yimpaş Yozgatspor	Adana
13:30				Stadium: Adana 5 Ocak Stadium

3 March 2001 23	Antalyaspor	2–1	Adanaspor	Antalya
14:00

11 March 2001 24	Çaykur Rizespor	4–2	Adanaspor	Rize
14:00

18 March 2001 25	Denizlispor	4–2	Adanaspor	Denizli
14:00

1 April 2001 26	Fenerbahçe	4–0	Adanaspor	Istanbul
19:00

7 April 2001 27	Adanaspor	1–3	Ankaragücü	Adana
15:00				Stadium: Adana 5 Ocak Stadium

15 April 2001 28	Gaziantepspor	3–0	Adanaspor	Gaziantep
15:00

21 April 2001 29	Adanaspor	1–7	Trabzonspor	Adana
15:00				Stadium: Adana 5 Ocak Stadium

28 April 2001 30	Galatasaray	4–1	Adanaspor	Istanbul
19:00

5 May 2001 31	Adanaspor	3–3	Erzurumspor	Adana
16:30				Stadium: Adana 5 Ocak Stadium

12 May 2001 32	Bursaspor	2–1	Adanaspor	Bursa
19:00

19 May 2001 33	Adanaspor	3–5	Samsunspor	Adana
19:00				Stadium: Adana 5 Ocak Stadium

26 May 2001 34	Kocaelispor	4–3	Adanaspor	Kocaeli
17:00

=== Turkish Cup ===
29 November 2000 Third round	Adanaspor	6–3	Konyaspor	Adana
				Stadium: Adana 5 Ocak Stadium; Referee: Ferhat Gündogdu

13 December 2000 Fourth round	Galatasaray	2–1	Adanaspor	Istanbul
				Stadium: Ali Sami Yen Stadium; Referee: Selcuk Dereli
