= 2000–01 1.Lig =

43rd season of top-tier Turkish football

1.Lig
- Season: 2000–01
- Champions: Fenerbahçe; 14th title
- Relegated: Siirt Jet-PA Spor; Erzurumspor; Adanaspor
- Champions League: Fenerbahçe; Galatasaray
- UEFA Cup: Gaziantepspor; Gençlerbirliği
- Intertoto Cup: Çaykur Rizespor; Denizlispor
- Matches played: 306
- Goals scored: 1,017 (3.32 per match)
- Top goalscorer: Okan Yılmaz (23 goals)

The 2000-2001 Turkish First Football League was the 43rd edition of top-flight professional football in Turkey. The season saw many turning points for different teams. Galatasaray, the team that dominated the last decade and won the UEFA Cup, lost the title to Fenerbahçe SK for the first time in five seasons. Fenerbahçe reached to success with Mustafa Denizli, the first Turkish manager to win the league for Fenerbahçe. Southeastern side Gaziantepspor fought for the title for a long time during the season under the manager Erdoğan Arıca and Sakıp Özberk. They lost their hopes for title, when, in the 29th fixture, Fenerbahçe SK defeated them 4-3 at Şükrü Saracoğlu. Gaziantepspor were 3-0 ahead in the half-time.

== League table ==
Pos	Team	Pld	W	D	L	GF	GA	GD	Pts	Qualification or relegation
1	Fenerbahçe (C)	34	24	4	6	82	39	+43	76	Qualification to Champions League third qualifying round
2	Galatasaray	34	23	4	7	77	35	+42	73	Qualification to Champions League second qualifying round
3	Gaziantepspor	34	20	8	6	67	40	+27	68	Qualification to UEFA Cup qualifying round
4	Beşiktaş	34	19	7	8	68	48	+20	64	
5	Trabzonspor	34	17	7	10	69	52	+17	58	
6	MKE Ankaragücü	34	16	8	10	65	59	+6	56	
7	Yimpaş Yozgatspor	34	13	10	11	55	46	+9	49	
8	Samsunspor	34	13	9	12	55	52	+3	48	
9	Çaykur Rizespor	34	13	7	14	45	43	+2	46	Qualification to Intertoto Cup second round
10	Gençlerbirliği	34	14	4	16	44	53	−9	46	Qualification to UEFA Cup first round (Note: Winner of 2000–01 Turkish Cup)
11	Denizlispor	34	12	9	13	53	56	−3	45	Qualification to Intertoto Cup first round
12	İstanbulspor	34	12	8	14	47	58	−11	44	
13	Kocaelispor	34	10	11	13	56	60	−4	41	
14	Bursaspor	34	11	7	16	55	60	−5	40	
15	Antalyaspor	34	9	9	16	45	64	−19	36	
16	Siirt Jet-PA Spor (R)	34	6	6	22	47	81	−34	24	Relegation to Turkish Second League Category A
17	Erzurumspor (R)	34	5	6	23	36	80	−44	21	Relegation to Turkish Second League Category A
18	Adanaspor (R)	34	2	10	22	51	91	−40	16	Relegation to Turkish Second League Category A

Rules for classification: 1) points; 2) goal difference; 3) number of goals scored.
(C) Champions; (R) Relegated

== Results ==
Home \ Away	ADA	ANT	BJK	BUR	ÇYR	DEN	ERZ	FNB	GAL	GAZ	GEN	İST	KOC	AGÜ	SAM	SRT	TRA	YOZ
Adanaspor		1–1	1–1	1–1	1–0	2–3	3–3	1–1	1–2	0–1	2–3	2–2	4–4	1–3	3–5	0–2	1–7	3–3
Antalyaspor	2–1		1–2	2–1	2–1	4–1	1–0	0–1	0–1	2–2	4–2	2–2	2–2	3–4	2–2	1–3	2–3	1–1
Beşiktaş	2–1	4–2		2–1	2–1	1–1	2–0	3–0	3–1	2–4	0–3	2–0	3–2	4–0	0–0	5–1	3–1	3–0
Bursaspor	2–1	4–0	0–1		2–1	2–1	6–0	2–2	0–2	3–3	2–0	2–5	1–1	2–3	0–2	3–2	4–2	1–4
Çaykur Rizespor	4–2	0–2	5–1	3–1		2–1	4–1	1–1	2–4	2–1	2–0	2–1	2–1	1–1	0–1	3–0	2–1	1–0
Denizlispor	4–2	1–1	2–2	1–1	0–0		3–1	2–1	0–1	2–3	0–0	0–4	2–1	2–0	3–1	1–2	2–0	2–0
Erzurumspor	2–0	0–1	1–3	5–0	0–0	2–2		1–2	1–2	0–2	1–2	1–3	1–0	1–1	1–2	2–1	1–3	1–2
Fenerbahçe	4–0	2–1	3–1	2–0	1–0	5–2	4–2		2–1	4–3	3–0	2–0	4–0	5–1	2–1	4–2	5–2	3–1
Galatasaray	4–1	2–0	2–0	2–1	2–0	1–2	7–0	0–0		2–0	2–1	1–1	2–3	1–2	1–2	4–1	4–0	3–0
Gaziantepspor	3–0	2–0	3–1	2–1	2–1	1–1	6–1	2–1	0–2		1–0	0–0	0–0	2–1	4–0	4–0	1–1	3–1
Gençlerbirliği	1–0	2–1	2–1	0–1	0–0	2–4	1–2	3–1	1–4	2–0		3–0	0–0	3–4	1–0	2–0	0–2	2–1
İstanbulspor	1–6	2–0	2–3	2–4	1–0	1–3	1–0	1–2	3–5	0–1	2–1		1–1	0–2	0–0	2–1	1–0	0–4
Kocaelispor	4–3	5–0	1–1	0–0	2–1	4–2	1–0	0–4	1–4	1–2	4–1	1–1		4–0	1–0	1–1	3–2	2–2
MKE Ankaragücü	4–0	1–1	1–5	1–1	4–0	3–1	5–2	2–1	1–3	1–1	2–3	1–1	1–0		2–0	4–1	2–4	4–0
Samsunspor	3–1	4–2	2–3	2–0	1–1	2–1	2–2	1–3	1–1	3–3	1–2	2–3	3–0	3–0		4–3	1–1	0–2
Siirtspor	2–2	1–2	1–1	2–5	2–3	1–1	1–1	0–4	0–1	1–2	3–0	0–2	4–3	1–1	1–2		1–4	1–3
Trabzonspor	3–3	4–0	2–0	2–1	2–0	1–0	3–0	1–0	1–1	3–1	2–0	1–2	2–1	2–2	3–2	2–4		1–1
Yozgatspor	4–1	0–0	1–1	1–0	0–0	2–0	4–0	2–3	4–2	1–2	1–1	3–0	4–2	0–1	0–0	2–1	1–1	

Source: TFF, Mackolik
Legend: Blue = home team win; Yellow = draw; Red = away team win.

== Top scorers ==
Rank	Player	Club	Goals
1	(Turkey) Okan Yılmaz	Bursaspor	23
2	(Brazil) Mário Jardel	Galatasaray	22
3	(Turkey) Cenk İşler	Adanaspor	19
4	(Turkey) Hami Mandıralı	Trabzonspor	18
4	(Turkey) Hasan Özer	Gaziantepspor	18
4	(France) Pascal Nouma	Beşiktaş	18
7	(Turkey) Atilla Birlik	Antalyaspor	16
7	(Turkey) Sertan Eser	İstanbulspor	16
9	(Democratic Republic of the Congo) Andre Kona N'Gole	Gençlerbirliği	15
9	(Turkey) Fatih Tekke	Gaziantepspor	15
