= List of Turkey national football team managers =

The role of a Turkey national football team manager was first established in 1923 with the appointment of Ali Sami Yen. The most successful manager is Fatih Terim, he managed the national team in 136 matches, winning 70 matches. Guus Hiddink holds the record as the highest paid national team manager in the history of Turkish football.

== Statistics ==
As of 15 November 2026

Manager	Nat	Career Start	Career End	Played	Won	Drawn	Lost	GF	GA	Win %
Ali Sami Yen	Turkey	26 October 1923	26 October 1923	1	0	1	0	2	2	0.00
Billy Hunter	Scotland	25 May 1924	12 September 1926	12	5	0	7	21	29	41.67
Béla Tóth	Hungary	17 July 1927	17 April 1932	8	2	1	5	14	24	25.00
Fred Pagnam	England	22 April 1932	4 November 1932	2	0	0	2	3	7	0.00
James Donnelly	Ireland	12 July 1936	1 August 1937	3	0	1	2	4	10	0.00
Ignác Molnár	Hungary	23 April 1948	30 May 1948	2	1	0	1	3	2	50.00
Ulvi Yenal	Turkey	2 August 1948	5 August 1948	2	1	0	1	5	3	50.00
Pat Molloy	England	28 November 1948	20 May 1949	5	3	0	2	9	8	60.00
Cihat Arman	Turkey	20 November 1949	20 November 1949	1	1	0	0	7	0	100.00
Pat Molloy	England	28 May 1950	28 October 1950	2	1	0	1	7	6	50.00
Jimmy McCormick	England	3 December 1950	10 June 1951	2	1	0	1	4	5	50.00
Rebii Erkal	Turkey	17 June 1951	21 November 1951	3	2	0	1	3	3	66.67
Sadri Usluoğlu	Turkey	1 June 1952	8 June 1952	2	0	1	1	1	5	0.00
Sandro Puppo	Italy	8 June 1952	23 June 1954	9	3	2	4	18	21	33.33
Gündüz Kılıç	Turkey	17 October 1954	17 October 1954	1	0	0	1	1	5	0.00
Žarko Mihajlović	Yugoslavia	3 April 1955	26 June 1955	2	0	2	0	1	1	0.00
Giovanni Varglien	Italy	18 December 1955	1 May 1956	5	2	0	3	8	9	40.00
Cihat Arman	Turkey	1 May 1956	25 November 1956	2	0	2	0	2	2	0.00
László Székely	Hungary	5 April 1957	8 December 1957	4	2	1	1	6	4	50.00
Leandro Remondini	Italy	4 May 1958	10 May 1959	7	3	3	1	6	5	42.86
Ignác Molnár	Hungary	8 June 1960	8 June 1960	1	1	0	0	4	2	100.00
Sandro Puppo	Italy	27 November 1960	16 May 1962	10	4	0	6	11	10	40.00
Şeref Görkey	Turkey	10 October 1962	10 October 1962	1	1	0	0	3	0	100.00
Ljubiša Spajić	Yugoslavia	25 November 1962	16 December 1962	4	1	2	1	3	7	25.00
Sandro Puppo	Italy	27 March 1963	9 October 1964	4	0	2	2	0	4	0.00
Cihat Arman	Turkey	27 September 1964	20 December 1964	3	1	1	1	6	4	33.33
Sandro Puppo	Italy	24 January 1965	9 May 1965	4	0	0	4	2	13	0.00
Doğan Andaç	Turkey	21 July 1965	25 July 1965	2	1	1	0	3	1	50.00
Sandro Puppo	Italy	9 October 1965	30 May 1966	5	1	2	2	3	10	20.00
Adnan Süvari	Turkey	12 October 1966	17 January 1969	17	5	4	8	16	32	29.41
Abdullah Gegić	Yugoslavia	30 April 1969	16 November 1969	6	3	0	3	13	11	50.00
Cihat Arman	Turkey	17 October 1970	14 November 1971	6	1	1	4	4	17	16.67
Nicolae Petrescu	Romania	5 December 1971	5 December 1971	1	1	0	0	1	0	100.00
Coşkun Özarı	Turkey	12 April 1972	31 October 1976	29	8	11	10	38	43	27.59
Doğan Andaç	Turkey	17 November 1976	17 November 1976	1	0	1	0	1	1	0.00
Metin Türel	Turkey	16 February 1977	5 October 1978	13	2	1	10	11	22	15.38
Sabri Kiraz	Turkey	29 November 1978	15 October 1980	12	5	1	6	13	15	41.67
Özkan Sümer	Turkey	3 December 1980	25 March 1981	2	0	0	2	0	3	0.00
Fethi Demircan	Turkey	15 April 1981	7 October 1981	4	0	0	4	0	12	0.00
Coşkun Özarı	Turkey	22 September 1982	4 April 1984	17	5	2	10	15	36	29.41
Candan Tarhan	Turkey	6 September 1984	14 November 1984	5	1	1	3	3	13	20.00
Yılmaz Gökdel	Turkey	22 December 1984	3 April 1985	3	1	1	1	1	3	33.33
Kálmán Mészöly	Hungary	1 May 1985	28 August 1985	2	0	1	1	0	2	0.00
Coşkun Özarı	Turkey	11 September 1985	12 November 1986	8	1	3	4	3	14	12.50
Mustafa Denizli	Turkey	4 March 1987	16 December 1987	6	1	1	4	6	16	16.67
Tınaz Tırpan	Turkey	16 March 1988	15 November 1989	11	5	1	5	16	12	45.45
Fatih Terim	Turkey	11 April 1990	11 April 1990	1	0	0	1	0	1	0.00
Sepp Piontek	Germany	27 May 1990	28 April 1993	27	4	8	15	22	50	14.81
Fatih Terim	Turkey	27 October 1993	19 June 1996	33	17	8	8	47	36	51.52
Mustafa Denizli	Turkey	14 August 1996	24 June 2000	31	11	9	11	45	38	35.48
Şenol Güneş	Turkey	16 August 2000	18 February 2004	50	23	13	14	72	50	46.00
Ünal Karaman	Turkey	31 March 2004	31 March 2004	1	0	1	0	2	2	0.00
Ersun Yanal	Turkey	28 April 2004	8 June 2005	15	8	4	3	29	14	53.33
Fatih Terim	Turkey	17 August 2005	14 October 2009	58	26	18	14	86	71	44.83
Oğuz Çetin	Turkey	3 March 2010	29 May 2010	4	3	0	1	7	3	75.00
Guus Hiddink	Netherlands	1 August 2010	15 November 2011	16	7	4	5	18	15	43.75
Abdullah Avcı	Turkey	17 November 2011	20 August 2013	18	6	4	8	26	26	33.33
Fatih Terim	Turkey	22 August 2013	26 July 2017	44	27	8	9	69	38	61.36
Mircea Lucescu	Romania	2 August 2017	11 February 2019	17	4	6	7	17	25	23.53
Şenol Güneş	Turkey	28 February 2019	10 September 2021	32	15	10	7	55	40	46.88
Stefan Kuntz	Germany	19 September 2021	20 September 2023	20	12	3	5	46	26	60.00
Vincenzo Montella	Italy	21 September 2023	9 October 2026	40	21	5	14	66	58	52.50
Sergen Yalçın	Turkey	20 October 2026		2	0	0	2	2	4	0.00

== Most manager appearances ==
As of 15 November 2026

Manager	Nat	Played	Won	Drawn	Lost	GF	GA	Win %
Fatih Terim	Turkey	136	70	34	32	202	146	51.47
Şenol Güneş	Turkey	82	38	23	21	127	90	46.34
Coşkun Özarı	Turkey	54	14	16	24	56	93	25.93
Vincenzo Montella	Italy	40	21	5	14	66	58	52.50
Mustafa Denizli	Turkey	37	12	10	15	51	54	32.43
Sandro Puppo	Italy	32	8	6	18	34	58	25.00
