= Denizlispor =

Sports club in Turkey

- Full name: Denizlispor Kulübü
- Nickname: Horozlar (Roosters)
- Founded: 26 May 1966; 60 years ago
- Ground: Denizli Atatürk Stadium; Denizli, Turkey
- Capacity: 18,745
- Chairman: Süleyman Urkay
- Manager: Yavuz Özkan
- League: Denizli Super Amateur League
- 2025–26: TRAL, 14th of 14 (relegated)
- Website: www.denizlispor.org.tr
| Home colours | Away colours | Third colours |

Denizlispor is a Turkish sports club based in Denizli. It is known by its distinct green and black colors. The club's branches include football, volleyball, basketball, table tennis, and gymnastics. They play at the Denizli Atatürk Stadium, which has a seating capacity of up to 18,745 spectators.

== History ==
Denizlispor Kulübü was founded on May 26, 1966, as a merger of two smaller youth sports clubs, Çelik Yeşilspor Gençlik and Pamukkale Gençlik. They joined to form what is now Denizlispor, which was at the time a lesser known sports & youth club in the Çaybaşı district of Denizli city. This union made its registration at the Turkish football's governing body, the Turkish Football Federation (TFF) under the name of Denizlispor Youth Club. The new football team joined Turkish football's 2nd division for the upcoming season on July 14, 1966.

Denizlispor finished fifth in the 2001–02 Süper Lig, consequently qualifying for the UEFA Cup. In the 2002–03 UEFA Cup, the team defeated FC Lorient, Sparta Prague, and Olympique Lyonnais, before losing in the fourth round against FC Porto, who later on won the tournament. In the 2003–2004 season the black-green club managed another 5th spot. Denizlispor's form declined after the 2004–2005 season and struggled avoiding relegation. Denizlispor drew 1–1 against Fenerbahçe on the last match day of the 2005–06 season securing its stay at the highest level, upsetting the title chances of the team from Kadıköy. Denizlispor remained in the Super League despite a 3–0 loss against Ankaragücü in an away match on May 24, 2009, due to better results against Konyaspor, who got relegated. Denizlispor eventually relegated the next season to the TFF First League after a goalless home draw against Ankaragücü on April 24, 2010.

After the relegation in the 2009–10 season, Denizlispor competed in the TFF First League for nine seasons. In the 2010–11 season, Denizlispor completed the first half of the season as leaders. The team, however, finished the season in 9th place. The following seasons, Denizlispor did not achieve any substantial success. Denizlispor became champions in the 2018–19 TFF First League season, with 72 points, promoting to the Süper Lig.

After two consecutive seasons in the Süper Lig, Denizlispor could not manage to keep competing in the top-tier, relegating to the TFF First League. In the 2022–23 season, The Roosters had a disastrous start to the season with just six points in their first 16 fixtures, performing poor throughout the season staying in the relegation zone in 36 of the 38 rounds. The team relegated in the end to the TFF Second League for the first time ever in their history. The free fall of the Aegean team continued as it relegated in the 2023–24 season from the TFF 2. Lig to the TFF Third League, where it could not hold on, finally relegating from the professional football leagues to the Turkish Regional Amateur League at the end of the 2024–25 season.

== Crest and colours ==
Denizli SK's classic home kit

The Denizlispor crest was designed by Yakup Ünel, a founding member of the team. The crest is based around a rooster, which is identified with the province of Denizli. The team's colours come from the colours of a type of rooster with green and black feathers unique to Denizli region.

== Stadium ==
Denizlispor play their home matches in Denizli Atatürk Stadium. The stadium holds 18,745 people and was built in 1950. Denizlispor's first league match played against Eskişehirspor in 1983. The stadium does not have wire nets.

== League participations ==
- Süper Lig: 1983–88, 1994–97, 1999–2010, 2019–21
- TFF First League: 1966–83, 1988–94, 1997–99, 2010–19, 2021–2023
- TFF Second League: 2023–24
- TFF Third League: 2024–25
- Turkish Regional Amateur League: 2025–2026
- Denizli Super Amateur League: 2026–

== European cups ==
As of 27 February 2003

| Competition | Pld | W | D | L | GF | GA | GD |
|---|---|---|---|---|---|---|---|
| UEFA Cup | 8 | 3 | 2 | 3 | 9 | 12 | –3 |
| UEFA Intertoto Cup | 2 | 0 | 0 | 2 | 3 | 6 | –3 |
| Total | 10 | 3 | 2 | 5 | 12 | 18 | –6 |

UEFA Cup:

| Season | Round | Country | Club | Home | Away | Aggregate |
|---|---|---|---|---|---|---|
| 2002–03 | 1R | (France) | FC Lorient | 2–0 | 1–3 | 3–3 (a) |
| 2002–03 | 2R | (Czech Republic) | Sparta Prague | 2–0 | 0–1 | 2–1 |
| 2002–03 | 3R | (France) | Lyon | 0–0 | 1–0 | 1–0 |
| 2002–03 | 4R | (Portugal) | FC Porto | 2–2 | 1–6 | 3–8 |

UEFA Intertoto Cup:

| Season | Round | Club | Home | Away | Aggregate |
|---|---|---|---|---|---|
| 2001 | 1R | (Bosnia and Herzegovina) NK Čelik | 3–5 | 0–1 | 3–6 |

UEFA Ranking history:

As of 2007

| Season | Rank | Points | Ref. |
|---|---|---|---|
| 2003 | 115 ▲ | 22.495 | |
| 2004 | 112 ▲ | 18.656 | |
| 2005 | 131 ▼ | 17.872 | |
| 2006 | 138 ▼ | 16.634 | |
| 2007 | 126 ▲ | 16.791 | |

== Past seasons ==
| Season | Div. | Pos. | Pl. | W | D | L | GS | GA | P | Cup | Europe | | Manager | Notes |
|---|---|---|---|---|---|---|---|---|---|---|---|---|---|---|
| 1966–67 | 2Rd | 7 | 32 | 13 | 7 | 12 | 25 | 28 | 33 | 2nd round | | | Altan Santepe | First season |
| 1967–68 | 2Rd | 2 | 38 | 16 | 14 | 8 | 37 | 22 | 46 | | | | Altan Santepe | Did not qualify for Turkish Cup |
| 1968–69 | 2Rd | 2 | 34 | 12 | 18 | 4 | 24 | 14 | 42 | 2nd round | | | Altan Santepe | |
| 1969–70 | 2Rd | 3 | 30 | 14 | 9 | 7 | 28 | 16 | 37 | 1st round | | | Altan Santepe / Kadri Aytaç | |
| 1970–71 | 2Rd | 7 | 30 | 15 | 3 | 12 | 32 | 25 | 33 | 2nd round | | | Altan Santepe / Doğan Emültay | |
| 1971–72 | 2Rd | 11 | 30 | 10 | 8 | 12 | 16 | 19 | 28 | | | | Altan Santepe / Melih Garipler / Seracettin Kırklar | Did not qualify for Turkish Cup |
| 1972–73 | 2Rd | 11 | 30 | 8 | 12 | 10 | 23 | 26 | 28 | | | | İnanç Toker / Doğan Emültay | Did not qualify for Turkish Cup |
| 1973–74 | 2Rd | 9 | 30 | 8 | 14 | 8 | 25 | 25 | 30 | | | | Seracettin Kırklar / İsmail Kurt / Melih Garipler | Did not qualify for Turkish Cup |
| 1974–75 | 2Rd | 14 | 30 | 8 | 10 | 12 | 23 | 39 | 26 | | | | Melih Garipler / İsmail Kurt | Did not qualify for Turkish Cup |
| 1975–76 | 2Rd | 13 | 30 | 10 | 7 | 13 | 21 | 27 | 27 | 2nd round | | | Seracettin Kırklar / Melih Garipler / İnanç Toker | |
| 1976–77 | 2Rd | 13 | 30 | 8 | 10 | 12 | 24 | 41 | 26 | 1st round | | | İnanç Toker | |
| 1977–78 | 2Rd | 14 | 32 | 7 | 13 | 12 | 20 | 32 | 27 | 2nd round | | | Şükrü Ersoy / İnanç Toker | |
| 1978–79 | 2Rd | 8 | 30 | 9 | 10 | 11 | 22 | 24 | 28 | 4th round | | | Şükrü Ersoy / Melih Garipler | |
| 1979–80 | 2B | 10 | 30 | 10 | 9 | 11 | 28 | 31 | 29 | 6th round | | | Mustafa Özkula / İnanç Toker | |
| 1980–81 | 2A | 5 | 34 | 14 | 8 | 12 | 44 | 33 | 36 | 3rd Round | | | Mustafa Özkula / Melih Garipler / İnanç Toker | |
| 1981–82 | 2B | 5 | 28 | 12 | 7 | 9 | 41 | 20 | 31 | 5th round | | | İnanç Toker / Refik Özvardar | |
| 1982–83 | 2B | 1 | 30 | 20 | 6 | 4 | 38 | 12 | 46 | 5th round | | | Halil Güngördü / Doğan Andaç | Promoted to Süper Lig |
| 1983–84 | SL | 7 | 34 | 12 | 10 | 12 | 36 | 42 | 34 | 5th round | | | Nevzat Güzelırmak | First Süper Lig season |
| 1984–85 | SL | 16 | 34 | 9 | 11 | 14 | 39 | 48 | 29 | Semi-Final | | | Nevzat Güzelırmak | Best Turkish Cup position |
| 1985–86 | SL | 12 | 36 | 12 | 8 | 16 | 40 | 39 | 32 | 6th round | | | Özkan Sümer / Ilie Datcu | |
| 1986–87 | SL | 7 | 36 | 11 | 14 | 11 | 41 | 35 | 36 | 6th round | | | Nihat Atacan / Necdet Zorluer | |
| 1987–88 | SL | 17 | 38 | 12 | 9 | 17 | 35 | 48 | 45 | 5th round | | | Necdet Zorluer / Zeynel Soyuer | Relegated |
| 1988–89 | 2C | 2 | 34 | 19 | 9 | 6 | 53 | 29 | 66 | 1st round | | | Fethi Demircan | |
| 1989–90 | 2B | 4 | 32 | 14 | 11 | 7 | 45 | 31 | 53 | 4th round | | | Bülent Ünder / Behzat Çınar | |
| 1990–91 | 2B | 3 | 34 | 18 | 7 | 9 | 56 | 27 | 61 | 4th round | | | Behzat Çınar | |
| 1991–92 | 2B | 3 | 34 | 18 | 7 | 9 | 68 | 50 | 61 | 5th round | | | Melih Garipler | |
| 1992–93 | 1L | 4 | 18 | 10 | 2 | 6 | 30 | 20 | 32 | 1st round | | | Bülent Ünder / Erkan Velioğlu / Gündüz Tekin Onay | |
| 1993–94 | 1L | 2 | 18 | 11 | 2 | 5 | 36 | 27 | 35 | 6th round | | | Ömer Kaner | Promoted to Süper Lig |
| 1994–95 | SL | 15 | 34 | 8 | 11 | 15 | 41 | 53 | 35 | 6th round | | | Ümit Kayıhan | |
| 1995–96 | SL | 15 | 34 | 8 | 10 | 16 | 38 | 50 | 34 | 6th round | | | Ümit Kayıhan | |
| 1996–97 | SL | 17 | 34 | 5 | 5 | 24 | 36 | 81 | 20 | 5th round | | | Milorad Mitrović / Behzat Çınar / Ersun Yanal / Melih Garipler | Relegated |
| 1997–98 | 1L | 3 | 18 | 10 | 3 | 5 | 33 | 23 | 33 | 5th round | | | Raşit Çetiner | |
| 1998–99 | 1L | 2 | 18 | 9 | 5 | 4 | 40 | 30 | 32 | 3rd Round | | | Ersun Yanal | Promoted to Süper Lig |
| 1999–00 | SL | 8 | 34 | 13 | 8 | 13 | 55 | 57 | 47 | 3rd Round | | | Ersun Yanal | |
| 2000–01 | SL | 11 | 34 | 12 | 9 | 13 | 53 | 56 | 45 | Round of 16 | | | Yılmaz Vural / Tevfik Lav | |
| 2001–02 | SL | 5 | 34 | 12 | 12 | 10 | 65 | 52 | 48 | Semi-Final | IC | 1st round | Rıza Çalımbay | Best league position and first season in Europe |
| 2002–03 | SL | 10 | 34 | 10 | 10 | 14 | 37 | 42 | 40 | Round of 16 | UC | 4th round | Rıza Çalımbay / Giray Bulak | Best UEFA Cup position |
| 2003–04 | SL | 5 | 34 | 17 | 4 | 13 | 52 | 43 | 55 | Quarter-Final | | | Giray Bulak | Best league position |
| 2004–05 | SL | 6 | 34 | 13 | 10 | 11 | 46 | 45 | 49 | Semi-Final | | | Giray Bulak | Best Turkish Cup position |
| 2005–06 | SL | 15 | 34 | 9 | 10 | 15 | 41 | 50 | 37 | Semi-Final | | | Nurullah Sağlam | Best Turkish Cup position |
| 2006–07 | SL | 14 | 34 | 9 | 14 | 11 | 33 | 40 | 41 | 2nd round | | | Güvenç Kurtar | |
| 2007–08 | SL | 7 | 34 | 13 | 6 | 15 | 48 | 48 | 45 | Group Stage | | | Güvenç Kurtar | |
| 2008–09 | SL | 15 | 34 | 11 | 5 | 18 | 39 | 52 | 38 | Quarter-Final | | | Ali Yalçın / Ümit Kayıhan / Mesut Bakkal | |
| 2009–10 | SL | 17 | 34 | 6 | 8 | 20 | 30 | 49 | 26 | Quarter-Final | | | Erhan Altın / Nurullah Sağlam / Hakan Kutlu | Relegated |
| 2010–11 | 1L | 9 | 32 | 11 | 11 | 10 | 40 | 31 | 44 | Group stage | | | Hamza Hamzaoğlu / Serhat Güller | |
| 2011–12 | 1L | 10 | 34 | 11 | 12 | 11 | 51 | 46 | 45 | 2nd round | | | Güvenç Kurtar / Osman Özköylü | |
| 2012–13 | 1L | 11 | 34 | 11 | 10 | 13 | 35 | 37 | 43 | 2nd round | | | Engin İpekoğlu / Selahattin Dervent / Özcan Bizati | |
| 2013–14 | 1L | 10 | 36 | 14 | 4 | 18 | 42 | 56 | 46 | 2nd round | | | Serdar Dayat / Yusuf Şimşek / Özcan Bizati | |
| 2014–15 | 1L | 15 | 34 | 8 | 9 | 17 | 38 | 51 | 33 | 2nd round | | | Özcan Bizati / Engin İpekoğlu / Mehmet Altıparmak | |
| 2015–16 | 1L | 15 | 34 | 10 | 9 | 15 | 41 | 52 | 36 | 2nd round | | | Mehmet Altıparmak / Ali Yalçın / Koray Palaz | |
| 2016–17 | 1L | 11 | 34 | 11 | 10 | 13 | 46 | 45 | 40 | 3rd Round | | | Ali Tandoğan / Mehmet Ali Keskinler / Ali Yalçın | |
| 2017–18 | 1L | 15 | 34 | 10 | 8 | 16 | 43 | 47 | 38 | 2nd round | | | Yusuf Şimşek / Reha Erginer / Fatih Tekke | |
| 2018–19 | 1L | 1 | 34 | 21 | 9 | 4 | 67 | 32 | 72 | 4th round | | | Osman Özköylü / Yücel İldiz | Promoted to Süper Lig |
| 2019–20 | SL | 14 | 34 | 9 | 8 | 18 | 31 | 48 | 35 | Round of 16 | | | Yücel İldiz / Mehmet Özdilek / Bülent Uygun | |
| 2020–21 | SL | 21 | 40 | 6 | 10 | 24 | 38 | 77 | 28 | 4th round | | | Robert Prosinečki / Yalçın Koşukavak / Hakan Kutlu / Ali Tandoğan | Relegated |
| 2021–22 | 1L | 11 | 36 | 14 | 7 | 15 | 46 | 50 | 49 | Round of 16 | | | Serhat Gülpınar / Fatih Tekke / Mesut Bakkal | |
| 2022–23 | 1L | 18 | 36 | 7 | 5 | 24 | 35 | 67 | 23 | 4th round | | | Mesut Bakkal / Giray Bulak / Kemal Kılıç / Bülent Ertuğrul | Relegated |
| 2023–24 | 2Rd | 18 | 36 | 8 | 8 | 20 | 37 | 57 | 32 | 2nd round | | | Bülent Ertuğrul / Özcan Bizati | Relegated |
| 2024–25 | 3L4 | 15 | 30 | 5 | 12 | 13 | 27 | 55 | 21 | 1st round | | | Çağdaş Mavioğlu / Şükrü Akar / Ali Yalçın / Kürşat Taş | Relegated |
| 2025–26 | PGL | 14 | 26 | 5 | 3 | 18 | 29 | 48 | 6 | | | | Muhsin Sezer / Murat Candan / Yavuz Özkan | Relegated |
| 2026–27 | SAL | – | 0 | 0 | 0 | 0 | 0 | 0 | 0 | | | | | Relegated / Withdrew |

Last updated: 3 May 2026
Div. = Division; SL = Turkish Super League; 1L = TFF First League 2B = Turkish Second Football League, Group B; 2Rd = Turkish Second Football League, Red Group; 2Wh = Turkish Second Football League, White Group; 3L4 = Turkish Third Football League, Group 4; PGL = Professional Transition League; SAL = Super Amateur League Pos. = Position; Pl = Match played; W = Win; D = Draw; L = Lost; GS = Goal scored; GA = Goal against; P = Points
UCL = UEFA Champions League; UCWC = UEFA Cup Winners' Cup; UC = UEFA Cup; Cup = Turkey Cup. Colors: Gold = winner; Silver = runner-up.

== Players ==
=== Current squad ===
As of 27 August 2023

Note: Flags indicate national team as defined under FIFA eligibility rules; some limited exceptions apply. Players may hold more than one non-FIFA nationality.

| No. | Pos. | Nation | Player |
|---|---|---|---|
| 1 | GK | TUR | Ali Eren Yalçın |
| 3 | DF | TUR | Emre Yıldırım |
| 4 | DF | TUR | Muhammet Özkal |
| 5 | DF | TUR | Emirhan Kaşcıoğlu |
| 6 | DF | TUR | Mehmet Eren Sıngın |
| 7 | FW | TUR | Alihan Kalkan |
| 10 | MF | TUR | Omer Gündüz |
| 11 | FW | TUR | Mehmet Ali Ulaman |
| 13 | MF | TUR | Ertuğrul Yıldırım |
| 14 | MF | TUR | Bekir Turaç Böke |
| 16 | DF | TUR | Eren Kıryolcu |
| 17 | FW | TUR | Deniz Kodal |

| No. | Pos. | Nation | Player |
|---|---|---|---|
| 20 | GK | TUR | Abdülkadir Sünger |
| 24 | DF | TUR | Oktay Kısaoğlu |
| 25 | MF | TUR | Yusuf Emre İnanır |
| 26 | DF | TUR | Gökhan Süzen (captain) |
| 27 | DF | TUR | Emre Sağlık |
| 31 | GK | TUR | Ertuğrul Bağ |
| 37 | MF | TUR | Alaattin Öner |
| 42 | DF | TUR | Ahmet Tekin |
| 45 | DF | TUR | Emre Burgaz |
| 53 | DF | TUR | Mustafa Kemal Naza |
| 66 | DF | TUR | Berkant Gündem |
| 77 | MF | TUR | Emre Furtana |

=== Other players under contract ===
Note: Flags indicate national team as defined under FIFA eligibility rules; some limited exceptions apply. Players may hold more than one non-FIFA nationality.

| No. / Pos. / Nation / Player | No. / Pos. / Nation / Player |

=== Out on loan ===
Note: Flags indicate national team as defined under FIFA eligibility rules; some limited exceptions apply. Players may hold more than one non-FIFA nationality.

| No. / Pos. / Nation / Player | No. / Pos. / Nation / Player |

=== Retired numbers ===
Note: Flags indicate national team as defined under FIFA eligibility rules; some limited exceptions apply. Players may hold more than one non-FIFA nationality.

| No. | Pos. | Nation | Player |
|---|---|---|---|
| 18 | FW | TUR | Doğan Seyfi Atlı (2000–01) – posthumous honour)^{a} |

^{a} Following his death in 2001, the club's president Mustafa Baysal decided to retire the number 18 in his honour.

== Club officials ==
=== Board members ===
| Position | Staff |
|---|---|
| President | Erhan Ergil |
| Vice-president | M. Ali Gurgun |
| Vice-president | Ali İnceören |
| Vice-president | İsmail Kartal |
| Board member | Hikmet Olgun |
| Board member | Seyit Berber |
| Board member | Nedim Demirkan |
| Board member | Fethi Akcan |
| Board member | Necip İrdem |
| Board member | Ali Yörümez |
| Board member | Ömer Tuncer |
| Board member | Derviş Gedik |
| Board member | Ahmet Aşıkoğlu |
| Board member | Muhammet Kaplan |
| Board member | Ferhat Yıldırım |
| Board member | Osman Toker |
| Board member | İzzet Çağlar Altunbaş |
| Board member | Onur Kayhan |
| Board member | Cemal Işık |
| Board member | Osman Özdemir |
| Board member | Mehmet Teke |
| Board member | Hasan Yıldırım |
| Board member | Hüseyin Eren |

Last updated: 14 March 2024
Source: Denizlispor.org.tr

=== Technical staff ===
| Position | Staff |
|---|---|
| Head coach | Kürşat Taş |
| Assistant coach | Mustafa Bahadır |
| Assistant coach | Hamdi Demirtaş |
| Goalkeeping coach | Aydın Artanlar |
| Athletic performance coach | Yasin Karacan |
| Athletic performance coach | Alper Kartal |
| Scout | Ataberk Ates |
| Doctor | Ahmet Edremit |
| Physiotherapist | Yusuf Mercan |
| Masseur | Onur Kılınç |
| Masseur | Recep Avcu |
| Material manager | Sinan Kodal |

Last updated: 14 March 2024
Source: Denizlispor.org.tr

== Coaches ==
- (Turkey) Altan Santepe (1966–69)
- (Turkey) Kadri Aytaç (1969–70)
- (Turkey) Doğan Emültay (1970–72)
- (Turkey) İnanç Toker (1972–73)
- (Turkey) İsmail Kurt (1973–74)
- (Turkey) Melih Garipler (1974–75)
- (Turkey) Seracettin Kırklar (1975–76)
- (Turkey) İnanç Toker (1976–77)
- (Turkey) Şükrü Ersoy (1977–78)
- (Turkey) Melih Garipler (1978–79)
- (Turkey) Mustafa Özkula (1979–81)
- (Turkey) Refik Özvardar (1981–82)
- (Turkey) Halil Güngördü (1982–83)
- (Turkey) Doğan Andaç (1982–83)
- (Turkey) Nevzat Güzelırmak (1983–85)
- (Turkey) Özkan Sümer (1985–86)
- (Turkey) Nihat Atmaca (1986–87)
- (Turkey) Zeynel Soyuer (1987–88)
- (Turkey) Fethi Demircan (1988–89)
- (Turkey) Nihat Atacan (1989–90)
- (Turkey) Bülent Ünder (1990–91)
- (Turkey) Behzat Çınar (1991–92)
- (Turkey) Melih Garipler (1991–92)
- (Turkey) Ilker Küçük (1992–93)
- (Turkey) Gündüz Tekin Onay (1992–93)
- (Turkey) Ömer Kaner (1993–94)
- (Turkey) Ümit Kayıhan (1994–96)
- (Turkey) Behzat Çınar (1996–97)
- (Turkey) Melih Garipler (1996–97)
- (Turkey) Raşit Çetiner (1997–98)
- (Turkey) Ersun Yanal (1998–2000)
- (Turkey) Tevfik Lav (2000–01)
- (Turkey) Yılmaz Vural (2000–01)
- (Turkey) Sakıp Özberk (2001–02)
- (Turkey) Rıza Çalımbay (2001–03)
- (Turkey) Giray Bulak (2003–05)
- (Turkey) Nurullah Sağlam (2006)
- (Bosnia and Herzegovina) Faruk Hadžibegić (2006)
- (Turkey) Güvenç Kurtar (2006–08)
- (Turkey) Ali Yalçın (2008)
- (Turkey) Ümit Kayıhan (2008–09)
- (Turkey) Mesut Bakkal (2009)
- (Turkey) Erhan Altın (2009)
- (Turkey) Nurullah Sağlam (2009)
- (Turkey) Hakan Kutlu (2009–10)
- (Turkey) Hamza Hamzaoğlu (2010–11)
- (Turkey) Güvenç Kurtar (2011)
- (Turkey) Serhat Güller (2011)
- (Turkey) Osman Özköylü (2011–12)
- (Turkey) Engin İpekoğlu (2012)
- (Turkey) Yusuf Şimşek (2012–13)
- (Turkey) Özcan Bizati (2013)
- (Turkey) Serdar Dayat (2013)
- (Turkey) Ümit Turmuş (2013)
- (Turkey) Özcan Bizati (2013–15)
- (Turkey) Engin İpekoğlu (2015)
- (Turkey) Mehmet Altıparmak (2015)
- (Turkey) Ali Yalçın (2015–16)
- (Turkey) (England) Koray Palaz (2016)
- (Turkey) Selahattin Dervent (2016)
- (Turkey) Ali Tandoğan (2016–17)
- (Turkey) Ali Şimşek (2017)
- (Turkey) Yusuf Şimşek (2017)
- (Turkey) Reha Erginer (2017–18)
- (Turkey) Fatih Tekke (2018)
- (Turkey) Osman Özköylü (2018)
- (Turkey) Yücel İldiz (2018–19)
- (Turkey) Mehmet Özdilek (2019–20)
- (Turkey) Bülent Uygun (2020)
- (Croatia) Robert Prosinečki (2020)
- (Turkey) Kenan Atik (2020)
- (Turkey) Yalçın Koşukavak (2020–21)
- (Turkey) Hakan Kutlu (2021)
- (Turkey) Ali Tandoğan (2021)
- (Turkey) Serhat Gülpınar (2021)
- (Turkey) Fatih Tekke (2021–22)
- (Turkey) Mesut Bakkal (2022)
- (Turkey) Giray Bulak (2022–23)
- (Turkey) Kemal Kılıç (2023)
- (Turkey) Bülent Ertuğrul (2023)
- (Turkey) Özcan Bizati (2023–2024)
- (Turkey) Çağdaş Mavioğlu (2024)
- (Turkey) Şükrü Akar (caretaker manager) (2024)
- (Turkey) Ali Yalçın (caretaker manager) (2024–25)
- (Turkey) Kürşat Taş (2025)
- (Turkey) Muhsin Sezer (2025)
- (Turkey) Murat Candan (2025–2026)
- (Turkey) Yavuz Özkan (2026–present)

== Sponsorships ==
| Season | Sponsors |
|---|---|
| 1983–1987 | Emsan |
| 1987–1991 | Ofas |
| 1991–1993 | VakıfBank |
| 1993–1997 | SuperTon and Kinetix |
| 1997–1998 | Akça |
| 1998–1999 | Evita |
| 1999–2000 | Sümerbank |
| 2000–2001 | Denizlispor Koleji |
| 2001–2002 | Evita |
| 2002–2003 | Vestel and Denizbank |
| 2003–2010 | Turkcell |
| 2010–2012 | Bank Asya |
| 2012–2013 | Spor Toto |
| 2013–2014 | Tekden |
| 2014–2015 | Aydem |
| 2015–2016 | Zorlu Enerji |
| 2016–2018 | Lezita |
| 2018–2019 | Abalı |
| 2019–2021 | Yukatel |
| 2021–2022 | Pimatech |
| 2022–2024 | Rams |
| 2024– | no head sponsor |

| Season | Suppliers |
|---|---|
| 1993–1995 | Umbro |
| 1995–1997 | Asics |
| 1997–1998 | Puma |
| 1998–1999 | Adidas |
| 1999–2001 | Puma |
| 2001–2003 | Adidas |
| 2003–2004 | Puma |
| 2004–2006 | Le Coq Sportif |
| 2006–2008 | Kappa |
| 2008–2013 | Lescon |
| 2013–2015 | Umbro |
| 2015–2017 | Nike |
| 2017–2018 | Barex |
| 2018–2020 | Nike |
| 2020–2021 | Kappa |
| 2021–2022 | Diadora |
| 2022–2024 | Nadd |
| 2024– | Geges |

=== Naming rights ===
Due to sponsordeals the club name changed over the years. Tekden Denizlispor (2013–14), Abalı Denizlispor (2019), Yukatel Denizlispor (2019–21), Altaş Denizlispor (2021–23).

== Other branches ==
The club has football, basketball, table tennis, chess, figure skating and gymnastic teams. The club's most famous branch is its football team.
