= Fatih Terim =

Turkish footballer and manager

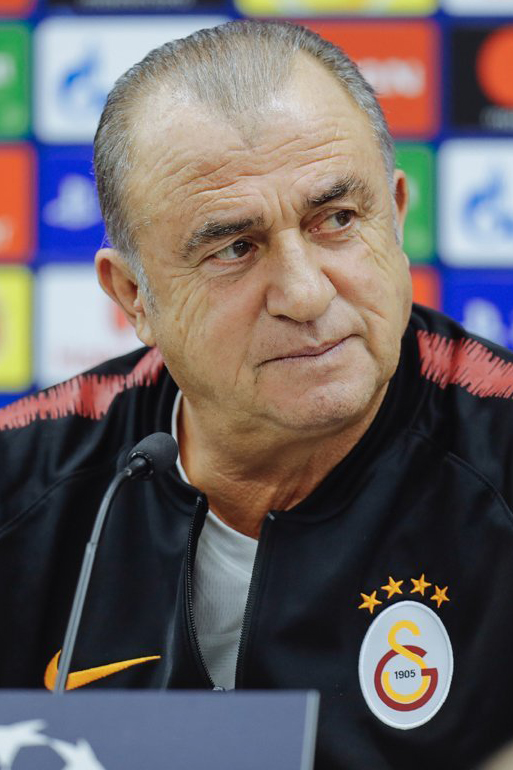
- Terim with Galatasaray in 2018

Personal information
- Full name: Fatih Terim
- Date of birth: 4 September 1953 (age 73)
- Place of birth: Adana, Turkey
- Height: 1.72 m (5 ft 8 in)
- Position: Defender

Youth career
- 1963–1969: Adana Demirspor

Senior career*
Years	Team	Apps	(Gls)
1969–1974	Adana Demirspor	125	(25)
1974–1985	Galatasaray	327	(16)
Total		452	(41)

International career
1971	Turkey U19	7	(0)
1973–1975	Turkey U21	10	(0)
1975–1984	Turkey	51	(2)

Managerial career
- 1987–1989: Ankaragücü
- 1989–1990: Göztepe
- 1990–1993: Turkey U21
- 1993–1996: Turkey
- 1996–2000: Galatasaray
- 2000–2001: Fiorentina
- 2001: AC Milan
- 2002–2004: Galatasaray
- 2005–2009: Turkey
- 2011–2013: Galatasaray
- 2013–2017: Turkey
- 2017–2022: Galatasaray
- 2023–2024: Panathinaikos
- 2024–2025: Al-Shabab
Medal record
Representing Turkey (as manager)
Men's football
UEFA European Championship
Bronze medal – third place	2008 Austria & Switzerland
- * Club domestic league appearances and goals

Fatih Terim (born 4 September 1953) is a Turkish professional football manager and former player.

During his football career, he played for Ceyhanspor, Adana Demirspor and Galatasaray. In his eleven years of playing time for Galatasaray, he won the Prime Minister's Cup in 1975 and in 1979, the Turkish Cup in 1975–76, 1981–82 and 1984–85 seasons and the Turkish Super Cup in 1982 with the club. Terim has managed several clubs in Turkey, AC Milan and Fiorentina in Italy, as well as the Turkey national team, most recently from 2013 to 2017.

In a survey conducted by the International Federation of Football History & Statistics (IFFHS) in 80 countries, he was placed among the best eight managers in the world, receiving his award at a ceremony held in Rothenburg, Germany, on 8 January 2001. On 25 April 2007, Terim received the order of "Commendatore" awarded by the Italian state. In 2008, he received a nomination for UEFA manager of the year and Eurosport named him the best coach at UEFA Euro 2008. In December 2008, he was ranked the seventh-best football manager in the world by World Soccer magazine in 2008.

== Club career ==
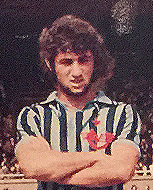
Terim with Adana Demirspor in 1973

In 1969, Terim began his professional football career with Adana Demirspor. Because of his financial difficulties, he was the only player in the team who was being paid secretly by the club at the time. He became the team captain three years later. He attracted attention with the game he displayed in Adana Demirspor, who became the champions of the 2nd League in the 1972–73 season. Terim played for Adana Demirspor until 1974, when he joined Galatasaray as a sweeper on 8 July 1974. Terim played eleven years for the Istanbul club. During that time, the club never won the Turkish league championship trophy.

He played for the Turkey national team 51 times between 1974 and 1985 and was the national team captain for 35 international matches, setting the national record in both categories at that time. In 1985, he had a fight with referee Hamza Alan for showing a red card to his teammate in a match and Terim was also shown a red card. It is alleged that Terim refused to leave the field, provoked the tribunes and was removed from the field by police forces. He decided to quit football after receiving a five-match penalty.

Terim's jubilee was held at Ali Sami Yen Stadium. He showed up to his jubilee match, which was between Trabzonspor and Galatasaray, by landing on the pitch by helicopter while the game was being played.

During his time as a footballer, he drew attention with his undisciplined behaviour and was frequently fined. Abdullah Gegiç, a famous football coach with Partizan in the former Yugoslavia and Eskişehirspor in Turkey, knew Terim from his days as a central defender and described him as an intelligent defender with "Beckenbauer-like" qualities. Gegiç attributed Terim's successes as a coach to the unique understanding of the game that he developed while playing as a central defender.

== Managerial career ==
=== Early years ===
After retiring from professional football, his first training appointment came from Jupp Derwall while they were both at Galatasaray. Terim's coaching career began when he was appointed the coach of Ankaragücü. He coached the club for 18 months before moving on to coach Göztepe in İzmir for a year. He had no significant success with either team. He was appointed as assistant to Turkey's national coach, Sepp Piontek, in 1990. He also coached the Turkey under-21 team. After serving as assistant coach for three years, he was appointed coach in 1993. Under his management, Turkey qualified for the final tournament of European Football Championship in 1996, for the first time in its history. Although they did not perform well in the tournament, losing all their matches and not scoring any goals, qualification was still considered a great achievement for Turkish football.

==== Galatasaray (first term) ====
After Euro 1996, Terim signed a contract with Galatasaray. The club had invested in strong (international) players such as Gica Hagi, Gica Popescu, Taffarel and Ilie as well as high-potential (academy) players such as Emre. Under his management Galatasaray won the Turkish league championship for four consecutive years and the UEFA Cup in 2000, making Terim the most successful Galatasaray manager in its history. His departure allowed Mircea Lucescu to clinch the UEFA Super Cup in 2000 for Galatasaray.

=== Fiorentina ===
Terim moved from Galatasaray to the Italian Serie A, signing a one-year contract with Fiorentina. His aggressive style of football and his tense relationship with club president and owner Vittorio Cecchi Gori made Terim popular among Fiorentina fans. With new boys Brazilian Leandro Amaral and Portugal's Nuno Gomes doing well up front, with a steadier defence and with Portuguese playmaker Rui Costa blossoming under Terim's constant praise and encouragement Fiorentina became a strong team in Italy. The league wins against A.C. Milan (4–0), Internazionale, Udinese and holding Juventus to a 3–3 draw came in a fortnight when the Florence club cruised into the final of the Coppa Italia eliminating Milan 4–2 on aggregate. Despite his poor start in the UEFA Cup (eliminated 5-3 on agg. by Tirol Innsbruck in the first round), Terim had managed to communicate something of himself to both his players and to the club's demanding fans. Even as Cecchi Gori was beginning to count the cost of sacking him, the fans made it clear that they were on the side of Terim.

However, later he announced that he would not renew his contract by the end of the season, because Cecchi Gori did not intend to make the investments that he requested. The team's performance declined significantly from then on because of his continuing clashes with Cecchi Gori led Terim to resign on 26 February 2001, before the season ended. Fiorentina director general Giancarlo Antognoni, one of the greatest players in the club's history, also resigned along with Terim's entire coaching staff, despite the fact that Cecchi Gori had begged him to stay.

The Romanian football legend Gheorghe Hagi praised his work in Florence: "In five months he built up a phenomenal side at Fiorentina. Name me another foreigner capable of that. He's extraordinary – he could coach any side." Prior his leave from Florence there were rumours that Terim would join Milan next season.

=== Milan ===
On 18 June 2001, Terim signed a two-year contract with A.C. Milan replacing the caretaker manager Cesare Maldini. He transformed Milan's system, employing a style very similar to the total football of Rinus Michels, playing a 4–3–1–2 formation with Rui Costa as a key player, whom he brought from his previous team, Fiorentina. Terim built a highly attacking side, but during this period Milan was also notorious for being vulnerable at the back, often conceding goals unexpectedly and drawing against "underdog" teams. On 5 November 2001, after the 0–1 defeat against Torino his contract was terminated after only five months of work and he was replaced by Carlo Ancelotti, despite the fact that Terim had received a vote of confidence from Milan vice-president Galliani following a 1–1 draw with bottom-placed Venezia in mid-October. However Paolo Maldini had admitted that the players must share the blame for Terim's sacking as manager: "Terim's failure was also our failure. Now the team must look at themselves as there are no more excuses. Maybe it was the players' fault because we couldn't put Terim's teachings into action". Another reaction was made by midfielder Brocchi about the pressure from the board of directors to Terim: "From the beginning there was a lot of external pressure on Terim as well as many dubious episodes that made one think there wasn't 100% faith in him".

=== Return to Galatasaray (second term) ===
In the summer of 2002, Terim returned to Galatasaray after Lucescu resigned at the end of the 2001-2002 season despite winning the league. Terim brought back Ümit Davala and Hakan Ünsal from the UEFA Cup winning squad and transferred Felipe to the number 10 position. On 11 August 2002, Terim's second Galatasaray campaign started successfully with a 4–1 victory over Samsunspor in the first week of the Süper Lig. After going undefeated for the first 10 weeks, the team suffered a historic 6-0 defeat to arch-rival Fenerbahçe on 6 November 2002. In the same period, the team was also eliminated in the group stage of the UEFA Champions League after a disappointing performance. Although Galatasaray improved its performance under Terim later on, and had a winning streak in the league, it lost to Beşiktaş on 25 May 2003 with a last minute goal scored by Sergen Yalçın and lost the championship to Beşiktaş, coached by Lucescu.

In the 2003-04 season, while strengthening his squad with Hakan Şükür, he mainly transferred Romanian players to the team. Galatasaray managed to qualify for the Champions League groups again after passing the preliminary qualifiers. However, towards the end of the year, things started to go badly for the team. First, the team was eliminated in the Turkish Cup, losing 5-0 to Çaykur Rizespor. Then, Villarreal eliminated Galatasaray in the UEFA Cup third qualifying round by defeating them 3-0. Galatasaray dropped out of the championship race with consecutive point losses in the league and Fatih Terim resigned in March 2004, following a 2–1 loss at home to Çaykur Rizespor. Terim would later go on to state that he would never manage Galatasaray again. Clubs such as Inter Milan and Roma tried to lure him back to Serie A, but he did not depart.

=== Turkey (second term) ===
In the summer of 2005, Terim became the manager of the Turkey national team for a second time, taking charge of their last three qualifying matches (held in September and October 2005) – against Denmark, Ukraine and Albania – in UEFA qualifying Group 2 of the 2006 FIFA World Cup. Turkey finished second in the group and thus advanced to the two-leg play-off against Switzerland, who won the first leg 2–0 in Bern. Turkey won the second leg 4–2 in Istanbul, but Switzerland advanced to the 2006 World Cup finals on the away goals rule. The return match in Istanbul was marked by controversial attempts to destabilize the Swiss team before the match. The final whistle was followed by violence, and Swiss defender Stéphane Grichting was seriously injured. Turkey national team was sanctioned by a fine and six official home matches behind closed doors and on neutral ground by the FIFA.

Turkey started Euro 2008 by losing to Portugal. Against Switzerland, they were trailing at half-time but snatched a win two minutes into stoppage time. In the final group match, against the Czech Republic, Turkey reversed a two-goal deficit by scoring three goals in the final 15 minutes. Their evenly matched quarter-final clash with Croatia went to a penalty shootout, which Turkey won. Turkey lost to Germany in the semi-finals. During their estimated 490 minutes of playing time in this tournament, Turkey only led for 13 minutes.

After the successful Euro 2008 campaign, Terim was recommended by former Newcastle United manager Bobby Robson for the Newcastle position, but he was not appointed. Terim's contract was extended to 2012 at the conclusion of the tournament, despite heavy speculation that he might return to Italy or go to England to manage at club level.

In 2010 World Cup UEFA qualifying, Group 5, as of April 2009, Turkey had won two matches, drawn two and lost two, leaving them four points behind second-placed Bosnia and Herzegovina. This performance saw Turkey move up to tenth position in the FIFA World Rankings. On 11 October 2009, seeing that his country could no longer finish in the top two of Group 5, Terim announced his resignation. Turkey finished Group 5 in third position.

=== Third term at Galatasaray ===
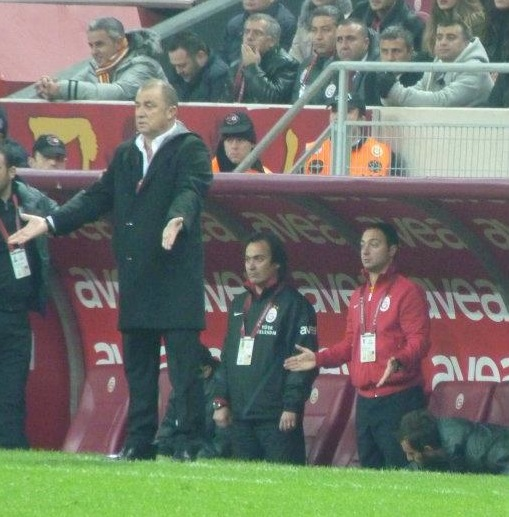
Terim with Galatasaray in 2011

Galatasaray failed to qualify for European football in the 2010–11 season. After internal conflict among board members, and the poor performance of the team during the 2010–11 Süper Lig season, Galatasaray appointed a new chairman, Ünal Aysal. Aysal's first act was to appoint Terim, his first and only choice, as manager – his third time to manage Galatasaray.

Galatasaray finished the 2011–12 Süper Lig season with 77 points, nine points ahead of rivals Fenerbahçe. The top four teams in the regular season – Galatasaray, Fenerbahçe, Trabzonspor and Beşiktaş – entered the Championship Group of the European play-offs. A new round-robin play-off format was introduced this season for the first time in the Süper Lig. In the last round of the play-offs, Galatasaray won its 18th title with a scoreless draw against Fenerbahçe at the Şükrü Saracoğlu Stadium. It was one of Galatasaray's best seasons, marked by the good performances of young players such as Semih Kaya and Emre Çolak.

In the third week of the 2012–13 Süper Lig season, Terim earned his 200th win as a Galatasaray coach against Bursaspor. In addition, Terim was invited to the UEFA Elite Managers Forum for a second time in 2012. (The first time was in 2002.) Galatasaray made a poor start to the 2012–13 UEFA Champions League season, losing the first two group matches in Group H, but they won three of their last four group matches to advance to the Round of 16. Galatasaray player Burak Yılmaz finished the group stages of the 2012–13 UEFA Champions League as top scorer, with 6 goals in 501 minutes, ahead of Cristiano Ronaldo, who scored the same number of goals in 540 minutes. During the winter transfer window Terim's Galatasaray transferred both Wesley Sneijder and Didier Drogba to strengthen the team towards the knockout phase of the Champions League. In the round of 16, Galatasaray eliminated Schalke 04 4–3 on aggregate. In the quarter-finals, they played Real Madrid – their first official match since the 2000–01 UEFA Champions League. Galatasaray lost 3–0 at Santiago Bernabéu, but won the second clash 3–2 in Ali Sami Yen with a beautiful heel goal by Didier Drogba but eliminated from the European competition by losing on aggregate. On 5 May 2013, Galatasaray secured its 19th title in the Süper Lig two weeks before the end of the season.

On 24 September 2013, Terim was relieved of his club duties after overseeing one win and three draws in four league matches in the 2013–14 Süper Lig season, plus a 6–1 home defeat in the 2013–14 Champions League group stage opening match against Real Madrid. The club's decision to sack Terim was taken after Terim and the board members had held a two-hour meeting at the Türk Telekom Arena in the afternoon of 24 September, followed by a unanimous vote by the board. The club stated Terim had rejected an offer of a two-year extension on his current contract, which had been due to expire in June 2014. Terim was directing a training session at the club's facilities when the board's decision was publicised later that day. As the news filtered out, dozens of supporters reportedly assembled in front of the training facilities to protest the decision, calling on the board to resign.

=== Turkey (third term) ===
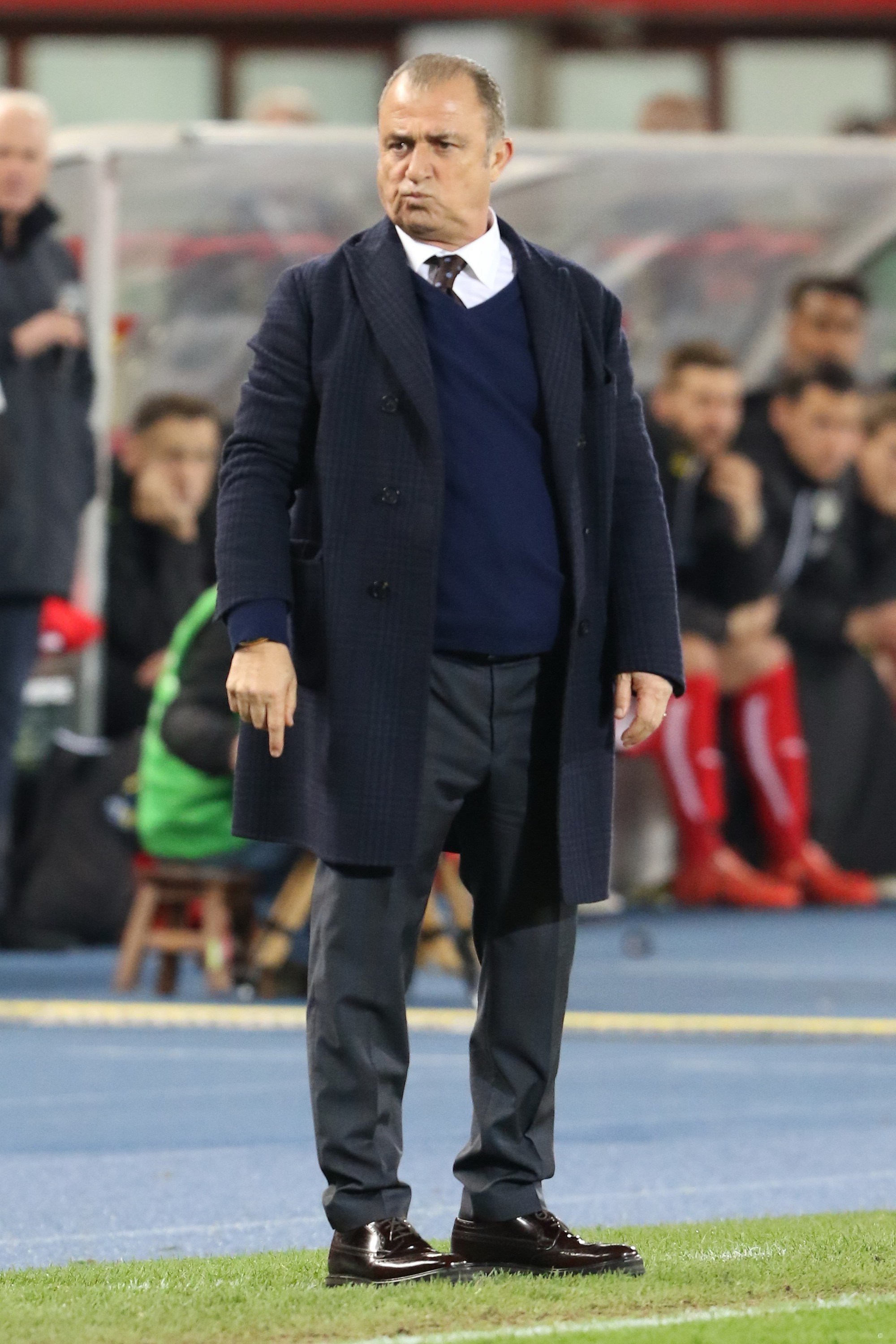
Terim coaching the Turkey national team in 2016

On 22 August 2013, Terim was appointed interim manager of Turkey, replacing Abdullah Avcı, ahead of four critical 2014 World Cup UEFA Group D qualifying matches. Turkey won their next three qualifying matches (against Andorra, Romania and Estonia), but lost their last qualifying match against the Netherlands 2–0 in Istanbul. Turkey finished Group D in fourth position and therefore did not qualify for the 2014 World Cup finals.

After parting ways with Galatasaray, Terim decided to continue with the national team and took charge of Turkey in the UEFA Euro 2016 qualifiers, in which the number of participating teams was increased. Turkey, who started the group matches very badly, had a chance to quality out of its group again by defeating the Netherlands 3-0 at home on 6 September 2015. On 10 October 2015, Turkey beat the Czech Republic 2-0 away from home and three days later, in the match against Iceland, Turkey won the match 1-0 with a free kick goal scored by Selçuk İnan in the 89th minute and finished third in the group.

=== Fourth term at Galatasaray ===
On 22 December 2017, Terim was announced as manager of Galatasaray, replacing Igor Tudor, on a contract that would have see him at the helm until the end of the 2018–19 season.

In the 2017–18 season, he became a seventh-time Turkish Süper Lig winner with Galatasaray. On 19 May 2019, Galatasaray became the champion of 2018–19 Süper Lig season in week 33, one week beforehand the end of the season. Terim won his eighth title in total and second consecutive Süper Lig trophy with Galatasaray. On 25 May 2019, during the cup ceremony at Ali Sami Yen, Galatasaray president Mustafa Cengiz announced that the club agreed on a 2+3 years new deal with Terim. He signed the new contract in front of 52,500 spectators. On 8 July 2019, Terim celebrated his 45th anniversary with Galatasaray. Galatasaray finished the 2020-21 season in second place, on goal difference and therefore did not become the champion for two consecutive seasons.

On 19 July 2021, the recently elected Galatasaray president Burak Elmas announced that they have signed a 3-year contract extension with Terim. This season was one of the toughest seasons for him at the club. Players such as Falcao and Donk had left the club and Terim had decided to invest in young potential players such as Cicâldău, Boey, Nelsson and Moruțan. However, early elimination from the Champions League (qualifying round) as well as many consecutive losses in Süper Lig (ended tenth by mid-season, 19 points behind the leader) caused lots of criticism of the coach by the fans and media. Galatasaray had ended the UEFA Europa League group stage on top position and Terim achieved the one and only positive result so far this season by qualifying to the round of 16 directly. However, after elimination against TFF First League side Denizlispor in the cup and a new defeat against Giresunspor at beginning of the second half of the season, many fans started calling the coach to resignation.

On 10 January 2022, he was relieved from his contract after the poor results and replaced by Spanish coach Domènec Torrent. On 13 January 2022, Terim shared a photo of his signature regarding the contract termination by the club via his personal social media account, mentioning that it was his last signature at Galatasaray.

=== Panathinaikos ===
On 26 December 2023, Terim signed a one-and-a-half-year contract with Greek club Panathinaikos, replacing Ivan Jovanović. On 17 May 2024, Terim was relieved from his contract.

=== Al Shabab ===
On 27 December 2024 Saudi Arabian club Al Shabab appointed Terim as head coach, signing him on a six-month contract with an option for an additional year. On 7 July 2025, Al Shabab parted ways with him after they appointed Imanol Alguacil as the new head coach.

== Personal life ==
He was born in Adana, Turkey, to Nuriye and Talat Terim. Talat, his father, is a Turkish Cypriot who emigrated to Turkey. He is married to Fulya Terim. They have two daughters, Merve and Buse.

== Career statistics ==
=== Player ===
Club	Season	League		Cup		Other (Note: Includes Atatürk Cup, Chancellor Cup, President Cup and TSYD Cup)		Europe (Note: Includes UEFA Champions League, UEFA Cup and UEFA Super Cup)		Total	
Club	Season	Apps	Goals	Apps	Goals	Apps	Goals	Apps	Goals	Apps	Goals
Adana Demirspor	1973–74	28	2	-	-	-	-	-	-	28	2
Adana Demirspor	Total	28	2	-	-	-	-	-	-	28	2
Galatasaray	1974–75	30	2	-	-	3	0	-	-	33	2
Galatasaray	1975–76	30	3	8	1	4	1	4	0	46	5
Galatasaray	1976–77	29	2	2	0	-	-	-	-	31	2
Galatasaray	1977–78	29	2	5	0	2	0	-	-	36	2
Galatasaray	1978–79	27	2	2	2	3	1	2	1	34	6
Galatasaray	1979–80	30	2	10	0	2	0	2	0	44	2
Galatasaray	1980–81	27	2	6	0	1	0	-	-	34	2
Galatasaray	1981–82	28	0	9	1	3	0	-	-	40	1
Galatasaray	1982–83	29	1	2	0	2	1	-	-	33	2
Galatasaray	1983–84	28	0	5	0	2	0	-	-	35	0
Galatasaray	1984–85	30	0	8	3	3	0	-	-	41	3
Galatasaray	Total	317	16	57	7	25	3	8	1	407	27
Career total		345	18	57	7	25	3	8	1	435	29

=== International ===
Turkey national team
Year	Apps	Goals
1975	5	0
1976	6	0
1977	8	0
1978	3	0
1979	6	1
1980	5	1
1981	4	0
1982	3	0
1983	8	1
1984	3	0
Total	51	3

=== International goals ===
#	Date	Venue	Opponent	Score	Result	Competition
1	18 March 1979	İzmir Atatürk Stadium, İzmir, Turkey	Malta	2–1	Win	UEFA Euro 1980 qualifying
2	24 September 1980	İzmir Atatürk Stadium, İzmir, Turkey	Iceland	1–3	Lost	1982 FIFA World Cup qualifying
3	12 October 1983	19 Mayıs Stadium, Ankara, Turkey	Northern Ireland	1–0	Win	UEFA Euro 1984 qualifying

=== Managerial statistics ===
As of match played 26 May 2025

Team	From	To	Record				
Team	From	To	G	W	D	L	Win %
Ankaragücü	1987	1989	82	34	23	25	41.46
Göztepe	1989	1990	32	18	9	5	56.25
Turkey U21	1990	1993	25	13	4	8	52.00
Turkey	27 August 1993	19 June 1996	34	17	8	9	50.00
Galatasaray	1 July 1996	1 June 2000	203	130	46	27	64.04
Fiorentina	1 July 2000	25 February 2001	28	11	10	7	39.29
A.C. Milan	1 June 2001	5 November 2001	15	8	5	2	53.33
Galatasaray	30 June 2002	20 March 2004	83	43	16	24	51.81
Turkey	1 June 2005	11 October 2009	58	26	18	14	44.83
Galatasaray	2 June 2011	24 September 2013	96	57	24	15	59.38
Turkey	22 August 2013	26 July 2017	44	27	8	9	61.36
Galatasaray	22 December 2017	10 January 2022	202	105	48	49	51.98
Panathinaikos	26 December 2023	17 May 2024	27	13	7	7	48.15
Al-Shabab	27 December 2024	7 July 2025	23	12	4	7	52.17
Total			952	514	230	208	53.99

==== Turkish Super Lig statistics with Galatasaray ====
As of 8 January 2022

Team	From	To	Record				
Team	From	To	G	W	D	L	Win %
Galatasaray	1996	1997	34	25	7	2	73.53
Galatasaray	1997	1998	34	23	6	5	67.65
Galatasaray	1998	1999	34	23	9	2	67.65
Galatasaray	1999	2000	34	24	7	3	70.59
Galatasaray	2002	2003	34	24	5	5	70.59
Galatasaray	2003	2004	26	11	8	7	42.31
Galatasaray	2011	2012	40	25	11	4	62.50
Galatasaray	2012	2013	34	21	8	5	61.76
Galatasaray	2013	2013	5	2	3	0	40.00
Galatasaray	2017	2018	18	14	1	3	77.78
Galatasaray	2018	2019	34	20	9	5	58.82
Galatasaray	2019	2020	34	15	11	8	44.12
Galatasaray	2020	2021	40	26	6	8	65.00
Galatasaray	2021	2022	24	11	6	7	45.83
Total			425	264	97	64	62.12

== Honours ==
=== Player ===
Galatasaray

- Turkish Cup: 1975–76, 1981–82, 1984–85
- Turkish Super Cup: 1982

=== Manager ===
Galatasaray

- UEFA Cup (1): 1999–2000
- Süper Lig (8): 1996–97, 1997–98, 1998–99, 1999–2000, 2011–12, 2012–13, 2017–18, 2018–19
- Turkish Cup (3): 1998–99, 1999–2000, 2018–19
- Turkish Super Cup (5): 1996, 1997, 2012, 2013, 2019
- TSYD Cup (3): 1997, 1998, 1999

Decorations

- (Italy) Ordine della Stella della Solidarietà Italiana (Commander of the Order of the Star of Italian Solidarity; by the Italian state at a reception hosted by the Italian embassy in Ankara): 2007

== See also ==
- National team managers with 100 or more matches
- List of Turkey national football team managers
- List of UEFA Cup winning managers

== Notes ==
Sporting positions
Preceded by Gökmen Özdenak	Galatasaray captain 1980–1985	Succeeded by Cüneyt Tanman
