= Yavuz Özkan =

Yavuz Özkan may refer to:

- Yavuz Özkan (director) (born 1942), Turkish film director
- Yavuz Özkan (footballer) (born 1985), Turkish footballer
