= Tevfik Lav =

Turkish football manager

Personal information
- Date of birth: 11 July 1959
- Place of birth: Manisa, Turkey
- Date of death: 4 April 2004 (aged 44)

Managerial career
- Years: Team
- 1991–1992: Alaşehirspor
- 1992: Turgutluspor
- 1993: Ödemişspor
- 1993–1995: Manisaspor (assistant)
- 1995–1996: Bergama Belediyespor
- 1996–1997: Denizlispor (assistant)
- 1998–1999: Soma Linyitspor
- 1999–2000: Denizlispor (assistant)
- 2000: Denizlispor
- 2001: Siirt Jetpaspor
- 2001: Gaziantepspor
- 2001–2002: Siirt Jetpaspor
- 2003: MKE Ankaragücü
- 2004: Konyaspor

Tevfik Lav (11 July 1959 – 4 April 2004) was a Turkish football manager.
