= Mehmet Altıparmak =

Turkish footballer and manager

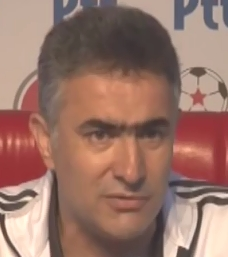
- Altıparmak as Denizlispor manager in 2015

Personal information
- Full name: Mehmet Altıparmak
- Date of birth: 1 May 1969 (age 57)
- Place of birth: Ankara, Turkey
- Position: Midfielder

Senior career*
| Years | Team | Apps | (Gls) |
| 1989–1994 | Gençlerbirliği | 89 | (5) |
| 1993–1994 | →Petrolofisi (loan) | 28 | (12) |
| 1994–1996 | Denizlispor | 57 | (12) |
| 1996–1997 | Bursaspor | 0 | (0) |
| 1996–1997 | →Eskişehirspor (loan) | 22 | (4) |
| 1997–1998 | Turanspor | 29 | (3) |
| 1998–2000 | Denizlispor | 32 | (13) |
| 2000 | →Diyarbakırspor (loan) | 18 | (1) |
| 2000–2003 | Elazığspor | 45 | (17) |
| 2003 | Sakaryaspor | 15 | (5) |
| 2003–2004 | Çanakkale Dardanelspor | 7 | (1) |
| 2004 | Yozgatspor | 10 | (2) |
| 2004–2005 | Şanlıurfaspor | 17 | (3) |
| 2005 | Turanspor | 5 | (0) |

Managerial career
- 2007–2009: Kartalspor
- 2009: Tarsus
- 2009–2011: 1922 Konyaspor
- 2011: Altay
- 2012–2013: Yeni Malatyaspor
- 2013: Kartalspor
- 2013–2014: Alanyaspor
- 2015: Denizlispor
- 2017: Gümüşhanespor
- 2017: Elazığspor
- 2017–2018: BB Erzurumspor
- 2018–2019: Gaziantep
- 2019–2020: Akhisarspor
- 2020: Hatayspor
- 2020: Kasımpaşa
- 2021: Gençlerbirliği
- 2021: Samsunspor
- 2022: Kocaelispor
- 2023–2025: Esenler Erokspor
- 2025: Amedspor
- 2025–2026: Sivasspor
- * Club domestic league appearances and goals

Mehmet Altıparmak (born 1 May 1969) is a Turkish professional football manager and former player. As a footballer, Altıparmak played as a midfielder.

== Career ==
Altıparmak was a footballer throughout the pro and semi-pro divisions in Turkey. A journeyman, he began his career with Gençlerbirliği and had stints at Petrolofisi, Denizlispor, Bursaspor, Eskişehirspor, Turanspor, Diyarbakırspor, Elazığspor, Sakaryaspor, Çanakkale Dardanelspor, Yozgatspor, Şanlıurfaspor, and Turanspor.

== Managerial career ==
Altıparmak is a journeyman manager for the Turkish semi-pro and pro leagues. He began as an assistant coach to Ümit Kayıhan at Kocaelispor, who was his former manager Denizlispor. He began managing with Kartalspor in 2007, and since has had stints with Tarsus, 1922 Konyaspor, Altay, Yeni Malatyaspor, Kartalspor, Alanyaspor, Denizlispor, Gümüşhanespor, Elazığspor, BB Erzurumspor, Gaziantep, and Akhisarspor. In 2018, he promoted BB Erzurumspor into the Süper Lig. Again, in 2020, he helped Hatayspor get promoted to the Süper Lig for the first time in their history. He followed that up with contracts at Kasımpaşa, and most recently as of 2021, Gençlerbirliği.
