= Behzat Çınar =

Turkish footballer (born 1946)

Personal information
- Date of birth: 9 April 1946 (age 80)
- Place of birth: Ankara, Turkey
- Position: Forward

Senior career*
Years	Team	Apps	(Gls)
1964–1968	Altay		
1968	Washington Whips		
1968–1970	Altay		
1970–1974	MKE Ankaragücü		
1975–1976	Altay		

Managerial career
- 1987–1989: Turkey U21 (assistant)
- 1990: Zeytinburnuspor
- 1990–1991: Denizlispor
- 1992: Yeni Yozgatspor
- 1993: Petrolofisi
- 1994–1995: Çanakkale Dardanelspor
- 1996: Boluspor
- 1996–1997: Denizlispor
- 1998–1999: Sekerspor
- 2000: Asasspor
- 2001: Erzurumspor
- 2002–2003: Adana Demirspor
- 2008–2009: Adana Demirspor
- 2015–2016: Denizlispor
- * Club domestic league appearances and goals

Behzat Çınar (born 9 April 1946) is a Turkish retired football player and manager who played as a forward.

== Career ==
In 1968 Çınar played for the Washington Whips of the North American Soccer League.
