= Celal Kıprızlı =

Turkish footballer

Personal information
- Date of birth: 28 April 1950 (age 76)
- Place of birth: Giresun, Turkey

Managerial career
- Years: Team
- 1987–1988: Keçiörengücü
- 1988: ASAS Spor
- 1991–1992: Keçiörengücü
- 1993–1994: Türk Telekomspor
- 1994–1995: Giresunspor
- 1996–1998: Ankara Şekerspor
- 1998–1999: Çaykur Rizespor
- 2000: Göztepe
- 2001: Erzurumspor
- 2002: Kayseri Erciyesspor
- 2003–2004: Kardemir Karabükspor
- 2001: Zonguldakspor
- 2006: Uşakspor
- 2010: Hacettepe
- 2012: Çubukspor
- 2014: Ankaragücü

Celal Kıprızlı (born 28 April 1950) is a Turkish football manager.
