= 2001–02 Turkish Second League Category A =

Turkish Second League Category A
- Season: 2001–02
- Champions: Altay
- Promoted: Altay, Elazığspor, Adanaspor
- Relegated: Hatayspor, Siirtspor, Erciyesspor, Batman Petrolspor, Aydınspor
- Matches played: 380
- Goals scored: 1,112 (2.93 per match)
- Top goalscorer: Yunus Altun (28)

The 2001–02 Turkish Second League Category A was the second-level football league of Turkey and the 39th season since its establishment in 1963–64. At the end of the season in which 20 teams competed in a single group, Altay, Elazığspor and Adanaspor, which finished the league in the first three places, were promoted to the upper league, while Hatayspor, Siirtspor, Erciyesspor, Batman Petrolspor and Aydınspor, which were in the last five places, were relegated.

== Final standings ==
Pos	Team	Pld	W	D	L	GF	GA	GD	Pts	Qualification or relegation
1	Altay (C, P)	38	23	6	9	78	55	+23	75 (Note: Head-to-head record: Altay 4–1 Elazığspor, Elazığspor 4–2 Altay (Altay ahead))	Promotion to Süper Lig
2	Elazığspor (P)	38	21	12	5	80	41	+39	75	Promotion to Süper Lig
3	Adanaspor (P)	38	21	10	7	82	41	+41	73	Promotion to Süper Lig
4	Sakaryaspor	38	21	7	10	70	38	+32	70	
5	Konyaspor	38	20	8	10	70	45	+25	68	
6	Erzurumspor	38	18	7	13	63	45	+18	61	
7	İzmirspor	38	18	6	14	56	61	−5	60	
8	Akçaabat Sebatspor	38	15	14	9	55	45	+10	59	
9	Kayserispor	38	15	10	13	50	48	+2	55	
10	B.B. Ankaraspor	38	14	10	14	45	41	+4	52	
11	Şekerspor	38	15	6	17	56	66	−10	51	
12	İstanbul B.B.	38	13	11	14	46	45	+1	50	
13	Çanakkale Dardanelspor	38	13	9	16	56	72	−16	48	
14	Gümüşhane Doğanspor	38	13	8	17	52	50	+2	47	
15	Sivasspor	38	13	7	18	48	62	−14	46	
16	Hatayspor (R)	38	12	9	17	43	43	0	45	Relegation to Turkish Second League Category B
17	Siirtspor (R)	38	10	6	22	53	80	−27	36	Relegation to Turkish Second League Category B
18	Kayseri Erciyesspor (R)	38	9	5	24	41	78	−37	32	Relegation to Turkish Second League Category B
19	Batman Petrolspor (R)	38	7	7	24	35	80	−45	28	Relegation to Turkish Second League Category B
20	Aydınspor (R)	38	5	10	23	33	76	−43	25	Relegation to Turkish Second League Category B

Source: TFF
Rules for classification: 1) points; 2) goal difference; 3) number of goals scored.
(C) Champions; (P) Promoted; (R) Relegated

== Results ==
Home \ Away	ADA	AKÇ	ALT	AYD	BPS	ANK	ÇDA	ELA	ERZ	GDO	HAT	İBB	İZM	KER	KAY	KON	SAK	SRT	SİV	ŞKR
Adanaspor		1–4	6–1	2–1	4–2	3–1	6–1	1–1	1–0	1–0	3–1	2–0	4–0	7–1	1–1	5–1	2–0	0–1	1–0	0–1
Akçaabat Sebatspor	1–2		5–4	1–1	0–0	2–5	2–1	1–1	2–0	2–1	0–0	0–0	0–0	5–0	1–2	0–0	1–0	1–0	6–4	3–1
Altay	1–1	2–1		1–0	4–1	0–0	2–1	4–1	1–2	1–0	1–1	1–1	2–1	2–1	2–1	1–0	2–2	3–0	5–3	1–2
Aydınspor	1–3	0–0	0–1		1–0	1–1	1–3	1–1	0–2	3–2	3–1	0–2	1–2	1–1	0–0	0–4	0–0	1–1	2–4	1–2
Batman Petrolspor	0–4	0–1	0–5	1–0		0–1	2–1	1–2	1–4	1–4	1–0	0–0	4–5	2–1	1–2	1–3	2–2	1–0	4–2	0–0
B.B. Ankaraspor	0–3	4–1	1–2	5–0	1–1		1–1	0–0	1–1	1–1	3–1	2–0	0–0	2–1	1–0	2–0	0–0	2–0	0–0	1–0
Çanakkale Dardanelspor	1–1	3–4	0–1	0–0	2–1	2–0		1–0	2–1	4–3	2–2	2–2	1–2	1–0	1–2	1–1	1–0	3–3	3–1	1–0
Elazığspor	4–0	1–1	4–2	4–1	3–0	2–1	3–0		3–1	3–1	3–1	3–1	3–3	1–0	2–2	4–2	2–3	4–1	1–0	5–2
Erzurumspor	2–1	2–0	1–4	3–1	5–1	3–2	3–1	1–1		2–1	0–1	3–0	4–1	4–0	2–0	1–0	1–1	3–0	0–0	2–2
Gümüşhane Doğanspor	0–2	3–1	4–2	0–0	0–0	4–0	1–0	1–0	3–1		3–2	2–2	2–0	4–1	2–0	0–1	0–2	1–0	0–0	2–0
Hatayspor	0–0	0–0	1–1	2–0	4–0	0–1	2–2	0–0	1–3	2–1		0–1	1–2	0–1	2–0	1–0	1–0	3–0	2–1	2–0
İstanbul B.B.	1–1	1–0	1–2	1–0	2–1	1–4	5–2	1–3	0–1	0–0	2–0		3–1	3–0	0–2	1–1	0–1	4–1	1–0	0–1
İzmirspor	1–3	1–1	2–4	2–1	3–0	2–0	1–1	0–0	1–0	1–0	0–2	0–3		1–0	4–2	0–1	1–0	3–1	1–2	3–1
Kayseri Erciyesspor	0–0	1–2	0–1	1–2	2–0	1–0	2–3	0–1	3–2	2–0	1–0	1–3	2–1		0–4	2–1	1–4	1–0	2–2	3–4
Kayserispor	2–2	1–1	3–2	5–1	1–1	0–1	1–0	1–1	2–0	1–1	2–1	1–1	0–1	3–2		2–1	0–4	4–2	0–3	2–0
Konyaspor	2–0	1–1	3–2	4–1	2–0	2–0	4–2	1–0	0–0	3–1	0–0	3–1	6–2	3–2	0–0		3–0	4–1	3–0	2–3
Sakaryaspor	2–2	0–2	1–0	4–1	1–2	1–0	3–0	1–3	2–0	1–1	2–0	1–0	2–3	1–0	2–0	4–0		2–1	5–1	5–1
Siirtspor	2–6	0–0	0–2	7–2	3–1	2–0	2–3	3–3	3–2	4–2	1–5	1–1	1–2	3–0	1–0	0–3	3–5		2–0	1–0
Sivasspor	0–0	1–0	3–4	2–0	1–0	2–1	2–3	0–4	1–1	1–0	1–0	2–1	3–2	2–2	1–0	1–2	0–1	1–0		1–2
Şekerspor	4–1	1–2	1–2	1–4	4–2	1–0	5–0	1–3	1–0	3–1	2–1	0–0	0–1	3–3	0–1	3–3	1–5	2–2	1–0	

Source: TFF
Legend: Blue = home team win; Yellow = draw; Red = away team win.

== Top goalscorers ==
Rank	Player	Club	Goals
1	(Turkey) Yunus Altun	Konyaspor	28
2	(Turkey) İlhan Arslan	Şekerspor	23
3	(Turkey) Yusuf Tokuş	Şekerspor	22
4	(Turkey) Bülent Karaman	Gümüşhane Doğanspor	20
4	(Turkey) Hakan Saral	Elazığspor	20
6	(Turkey) Altan Aksoy	Adanaspor	19
7	(Turkey) Murat Bölükbaş	Akçaabat Sebatspor	18
7	(Turkey) Necati Ateş	Adanaspor	18
7	(Turkey) Okan Çebi	Erzurumspor	18
10	(Turkey) Mehmet Altıparmak	Elazığspor	17
10	(Turkey) Sinan Kaloğlu	Altay	17
