= Fethi Demircan =

Turkish football manager

Personal information
- Full name: Fethi Demircan
- Date of birth: June 20, 1938 (age 88)
- Place of birth: Elazığ, Turkey

Senior career*
Years	Team	Apps	(Gls)
- İskenderun Karagücü

Managerial career
- 1973–1974: Elazığspor
- 1975–1976: Galatasaray
- 1977–1978: Galatasaray
- 1978–1979: Boluspor
- 1979–1980: Kocaelispor
- 1980–1981: Bursaspor
- 1981–1982: Düzcespor
- 1982: Turkey
- 1982–1983: Kocaelispor
- 1984–1986: Samsunspor
- 1986: Eskişehirspor
- 1986–1988: Çaykur Rizespor
- 1991: Malatyaspor
- 1991–1992: Sakaryaspor
- 1994: Düzcespor
- 1996: Erzurumspor
- 1997: Soma Linyitspor
- 1997–1998: Maltepespor
- 1998–1999: Ispartaspor
- 2001: Ayazağaspor
- * Club domestic league appearances and goals

Fethi Demircan (born 20 June 1938) is a Turkish professional football manager.

== Managerial career ==
Demircan had a 60-year career in football, mostly in his native Turkey. While in military service, Demircan was an amateur footballer for İskenderun Karagücü. İstanbulspor attempted to sign him professionally, but Demircan had mandatory duty and vowed to manage since he wasn't able to play. He began his managerial career with Elazığspor in 1973, before leaving to study in a Hungarian sports academy. He then went to England for language education, and studied sports physiology. While in England, he became a coach with West Ham United. He then received an offer to manage Galatasaray in 1975, and in his stint there won the Turkish Cup in 1976 and came second in the Süper Lig.

He then had spells in Kocaelispor, Bursaspor, and Düzcespor before managing the Turkey national football team in 1982. He continued coach in Turkey until 2001, wherein he started managing amateur teams. Throughout his career, he managed players such as Fatih Terim, Şenol Güneş, Tanju Çolak, and Metin Tekin.

== Honours ==
Galatasaray

- Turkish Cup: 1975-76
