= Bülent Ertuğrul =

Turkish footballer

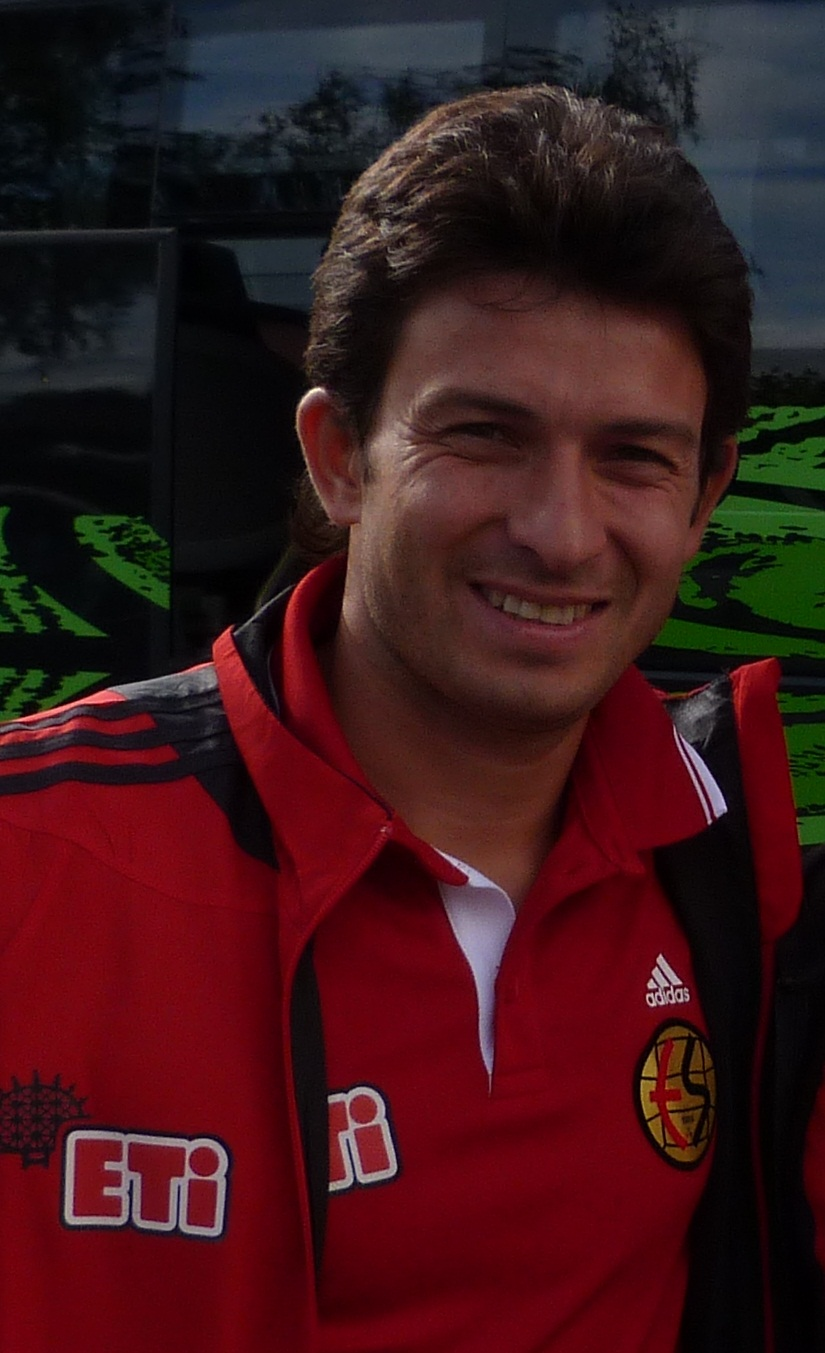
- Ertuğrul in 2011

Personal information
- Full name: Bülent Ertuğrul
- Date of birth: 17 September 1978 (age 48)
- Place of birth: Denizli, Turkey
- Height: 1.83 m (6 ft 0 in)
- Positions: Defensive midfielder; centre back

Youth career
- 1997–1998: Denizlispor

Senior career*
Years	Team	Apps	(Gls)
1998–2008	Denizlispor	165	(8)
1999–2000	→ Nazilli Belediyespor (loan)		
2000–2001	→ Hatayspor (loan)		
2004	→ Manisaspor (loan)		
2008–2012	Eskişehirspor	96	(2)
2012–2013	Elazığspor	16	(0)
2013–2015	Denizlispor	49	(3)

Managerial career
- 2017: Sivasspor (assistant coach)
- 2023: Denizlispor
- 2024: Nazilli Belediyespor
- * Club domestic league appearances and goals

Bülent Ertuğrul (born 17 September 1978) is a Turkish football manager and former professional player. He played in defender position.
