= Özcan Bizati =

Turkish football manager

Personal information
- Date of birth: 19 May 1968 (age 58)
- Place of birth: Denizli, Turkey

Team information
- Current team: Esteghlal (assistant)

Managerial career
- Years: Team
- 2000–2002: MKE Ankaragücü (academy)
- 2002–2003: Gençlerbirliği (academy)
- 2003–2005: Gençlerbirliği (assistant)
- 2005–2006: Manisaspor (assistant)
- 2006–2007: MKE Ankaragücü (assistant)
- 2007–2008: MKE Ankaragücü
- 2008: Pendikspor
- 2009: MKE Ankaragücü (assistant)
- 2009–2010: Denizlispor (assistant)
- 2010: Manisaspor (assistant)
- 2012: Samsunspor (assistant)
- 2012–2013: Trabzonspor (assistant)
- 2013: Denizlispor
- 2013–2015: Denizlispor
- 2015: Boluspor
- 2017–2018: Sivasspor (assistant)
- 2018–2019: Bursaspor (assistant)
- 2019: Kayserispor
- 2021: Gençlerbirliği
- 2021: Bursaspor
- 2023: Tuzlaspor
- 2023–2024: Denizlispor
- 2025–2026: Genclerbirligi
- 2026–: Esteghlal (assistant)

Özcan Bizati (born 19 May 1968) is a Turkish football manager.
