= Ümit Kayıhan =

Turkish footballer and manager

Personal information
- Full name: Ümit Kayıhan
- Date of birth: 28 February 1954
- Place of birth: İzmir, Turkey
- Date of death: 6 June 2018 (aged 64)
- Height: 1.75 m (5 ft 9 in)
- Position: Midfielder

Senior career*
Years	Team	Apps	(Gls)
1971–1974	Göztepe		
1974–1975	Balıkesirspor		
1975–1978	Altay		
1978–1979	Eskişehirspor		
1979–1982	Altay		
1982–1985	Altınordu		
1985–1986	Altay		
1986–1987	Kuşadasıspor		

Managerial career
- 1990–1991: Göztepe
- 1991–1993: Altay
- 1991–1993: Karşıyaka
- 1993–1996: Denizlispor
- 1996–1997: Antalyaspor
- 1997: Adanaspor
- 1997–1998: Diyarbakırspor
- 1998–1999: Erzurumspor
- 1999–2000: Altay
- 2000: Ankaragücü
- 2000–2002: Göztepe
- 2002–2003: Diyarbakırspor
- 2003–2004: Bursaspor
- 2004–2005: Diyarbakırspor
- 2006: Malatyaspor
- 2006–2007: Kocaelispor
- 2008–2009: Denizlispor
- 2010–2011: Çaykur Rizespor
- * Club domestic league appearances and goals

Ümit Kayıhan (28 February 1954 – 6 June 2018) was a Turkish professional footballer and manager.
