= Serhat Gülpınar =

Turkish footballer and coach

Personal information
- Date of birth: January 1, 1979 (age 47)
- Place of birth: Resadiye, Turkey
- Height: 1.80 m (5 ft 11 in)
- Position: Central midfielder

Senior career*
| Years | Team | Apps | (Gls) |
| 2003–2008 | Denizlispor | 154 | (24) |
| 2008–2013 | İstanbul Başakşehir | 74 | (7) |
| 2013 | Bugsaşspor | 0 | (0) |
| 2013–2014 | Ankaragücü | 50 | (5) |

Managerial career
- 2017: Bugsaşspor
- 2018: Afjet Afyonspor
- 2019: Elazığspor
- 2020–2021: Vanspor FK
- 2021: Serik Belediyespor
- 2021: Denizlispor
- 2022–2023: Ankara D.S.
- 2023: Keçiörengücü
- 2024: Boluspor
- * Club domestic league appearances and goals

Serhat Gülpınar (born January 1, 1979) is a Turkish football coach and a former player who most recently coached Boluspor.

== Career ==
Gülpınar was appointed manager of Elazığspor with the club in the relegation places and only 10 matches remaining in the 2018–19 TFF First League season.
