= Engin İpekoğlu =

Turkish footballer and manager

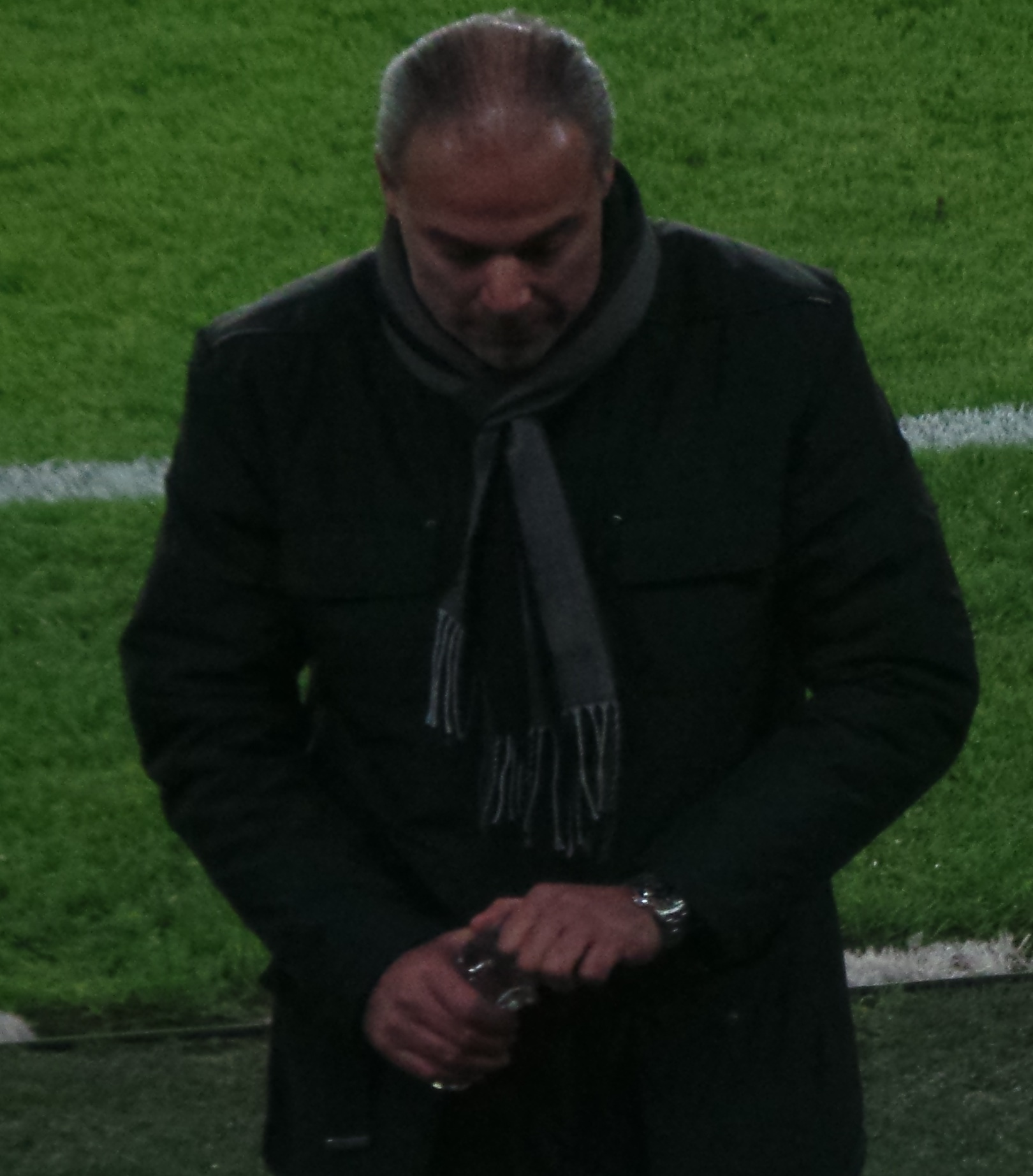
Engin İpekoğlu

Engin İpekoğlu (born 7 June 1961 in İzmir, Turkey) is a Turkish football manager and former goalkeeper who most recently served as manager of Adanaspor.

He began his football career with Prater SV, an Austrian team, in 1978. He transferred to Sakaryaspor in 1982, became professional in Sakaryaspor in 1985, and won the Turkish Cup with the team in 1988. He transferred to Beşiktaş in 1989. With Beşiktaş, he won two Turkish First League titles (1990 and 1991) and one Turkish Cup (1990). He transferred to Fenerbahçe in 1991, and was first goalkeeper until he got injured at the Kayserispor match in the 1994-95 season. İpekoğlu won the Turkish First League title again with Fenerbahçe in 1996. He transferred to Çanakkale Dardanelspor, which got promoted to Turkish First League in the 1995-96 season, and he became first goalkeeper there until Çanakkale Dardanelspor's relegation to Turkish Second League in the 1998-99 season. He returned to Fenerbahçe and kept Fenerbahçe's goal for seven more games. He was also capped for the Turkey national football team 32 times, beginning with a friendly against Greece on 29 March 1989.

İpekoğlu retired from football at the end of the 1999-2000 season. He became assistant manager of Raşit Çetiner, who was manager for the Turkish U-21 team. He stayed as the assistant manager of Raşit Çetiner, who became the manager of Bursaspor in the 2004-2005 season. Bursaspor returned to the Süper Lig two years after relegation. He took over Bursaspor after Çetiner resigned eleven weeks into the 2006-2007 season.
