= Coşkun Özarı =

Turkish footballer and coach

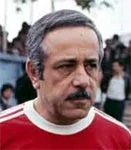

Personal information
- Full name: Coşkun Özarı
- Date of birth: 4 January 1931
- Place of birth: Istanbul, Turkey
- Date of death: 22 June 2011 (aged 80)
- Place of death: Istanbul, Turkey
- Position: Defender

Youth career
- –1948: Galatasaray SK

Senior career*
Years	Team	Apps	(Gls)
1948–1960	Galatasaray SK	120	(18)

International career
1955–1958	Turkey	5	(0)

Managerial career
- 1963–1964: Galatasaray SK
- 1965–1966: Şekerspor
- 1968–1969: Şekerspor
- 1970–1971: Galatasaray SK
- 1972–1976: Turkey
- 1978–1979: Galatasaray SK
- 1980–1982: Adana Demirspor
- 1982–1984: Turkey
- 1985–1986: Turkey
- * Club domestic league appearances and goals

Coşkun Özarı (January 4, 1931 – June 22, 2011) was a Turkish football player and coach.

Born 1931 in Istanbul, Coşkun Özarı joined Galatasaray as a very young student. After graduating from Galatasaray Lycee, he first appeared in the Galatasaray starting line-up at the age of 17. The backbone of Galatasaray, as well as the national team defense for the next 13 years, Özarı was known for his hard tackling, but mild manners.

His leadership in defense led the team with Gündüz Kılıç as coach, Turgay Şeren in goal and Metin Oktay upfront, to several championships and Turkish Cup victories.

Özarı's career as a player ended early due to his desire to become a coach. In 1961, he attended a coaching seminar in England, led by Walter Winterbottom. When he returned home, he became Galatasaray's assistant coach. Three years later, he took over the head coach position from Kılıç and led the team to four championships.

When he was appointed national team coach, in 1965, he coached the team for 10 years. He managed the team from 1972 to 1976. He ended his coaching career in 1986 and became a sportswriter.

== Death ==
Coşkun Özarı died on June 22, 2011, at a hospital in Istanbul. Following the religious funeral service held at Teşvikiye Mosque, attended by officials of major football clubs, his body was laid to rest at the Zincirlikuyu Cemetery.

== See also ==
- List of one-club men
