= Hasan Özer =

Turkish footballer and manager

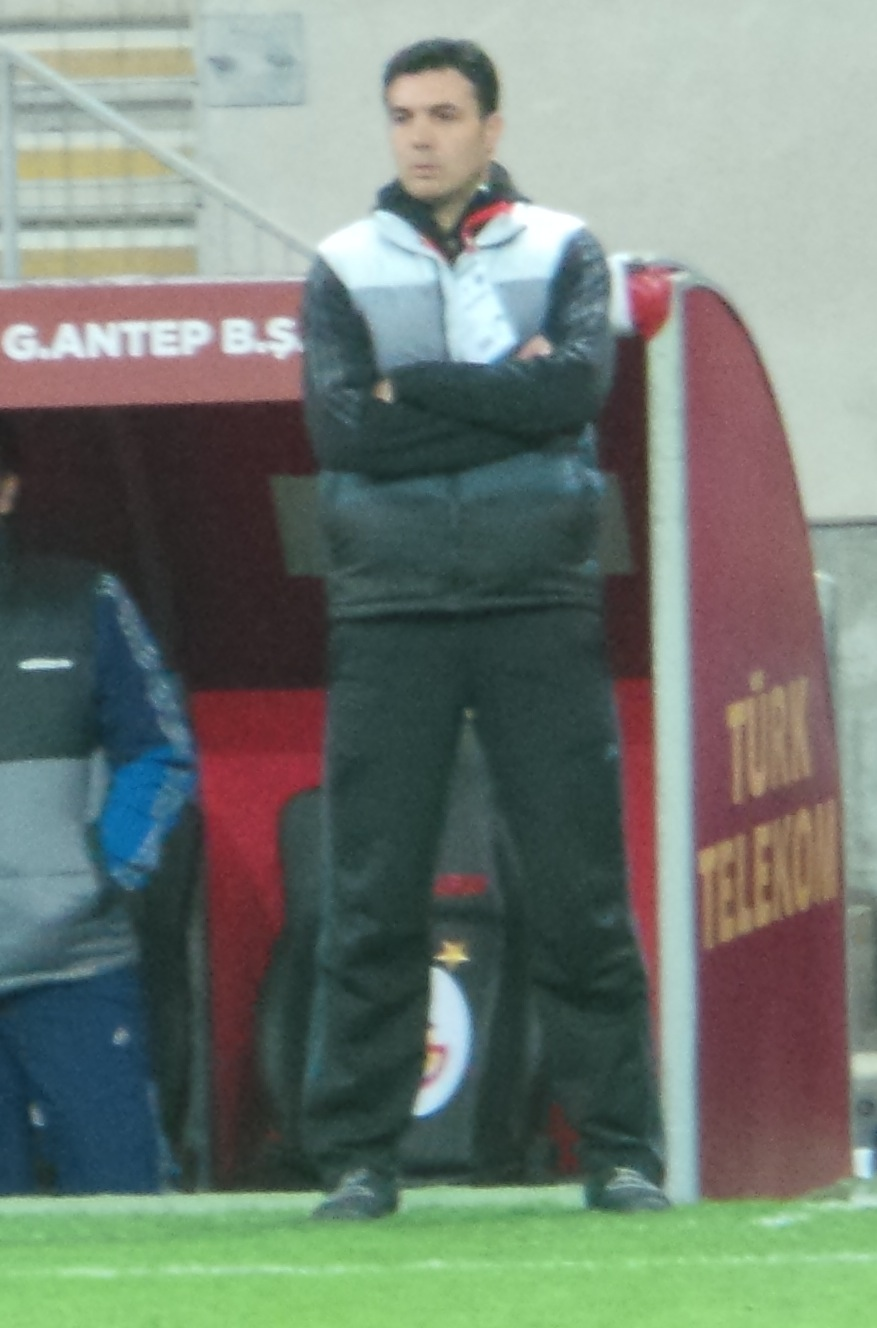
- Özer with Gazişehir Gaziantep in 2013

Personal information
- Date of birth: 1 October 1974 (age 52)
- Place of birth: Siirt, Turkey
- Height: 1.85 m (6 ft 1 in)
- Position: Striker

Senior career*
Years	Team	Apps	(Gls)
1991–1992	Siirtspor	27	(7)
1992	Kartal	0	(0)
1992–1995	Gaziantepspor	56	(12)
1995–1998	Trabzonspor	47	(8)
1997–1998	→ Turanspor (loan)	24	(4)
1998–2000	Altay	55	(22)
2000–2004	Gaziantepspor	88	(33)
2002	→ Çaykur Rizespor (loan)	13	(6)
2002–2003	→ Malatyaspor (loan)	26	(8)
2004–2005	Akçaabat Sebatspor	12	(2)
2005	Antalyaspor	17	(5)
2006	Diyarbakırspor	11	(1)
2006–2007	Elazığspor	13	(2)
2007–2008	Altay	3	(0)
Total		392	(110)

International career
1992–1993	Turkey U18	15	(0)
1994–1995	Turkey U21	10	(2)
2001	Turkey	4	(0)

Managerial career
- 2008–2009: Elazığspor
- 2010–2011: Manisaspor (assistant)
- 2012–2013: Gaziantepspor (assistant)
- 2013: Bursaspor (assistant)
- 2013–2014: Gazişehir Gaziantep (assistant)
- 2013: Gazişehir Gaziantep (caretaker)
- 2016–2017: Çaykur Rizespor (assistant)
- 2018–2019: Kayserispor (assistant)
- 2019: Čelik Zenica
- 2019: Kayserispor (assistant)
- 2020: Yeni Malatyaspor (assistant)
- 2021: Shkupi
- 2022: Yeni Malatyaspor
- 2023: Altınordu
- * Club domestic league appearances and goals

Hasan Özer (born 1 October 1974) is a Turkish professional football manager and former player of Kurdish descent.

Known for his acrobatic skills, he scored numerous bicycle kicks during his career, which he scored against Altay and Ankaragücü in 2002 and against Göztepe in 2003.

== Managerial career ==
As a manager, he was primarily an assistant manager in many Turkish clubs, most notably at Gazişehir Gaziantep, where he did work as a caretaker from September to October 2013, before becoming the assistant manager in November of that same year.

So far, as an actual manager, Özer was only in charge of Elazığspor from 2008 to 2009, until signing a two-year contract with Bosnian Premier League club Čelik Zenica, whose manager he became on 12 June 2019. On 27 August 2019, he unexpectedly left Čelik, not stating the actual causes.

== Managerial statistics ==
As of 24 August 2019.

Managerial record by team and tenure
Team	From	To	Record				
Team	From	To	G	W	D	L	Win %
Gazişehir Gaziantep (caretaker)	September 2013	October 2013	4	2	0	2	50.00
Čelik Zenica	June 2019	August 2019	6	2	3	1	33.33
Shkupi	January 2021	April 2021	7	4	1	2	57.14
Total			17	8	4	5	47.06

== Honours ==
=== Player ===
Trabzonspor

- Turkish Super Cup: 1995
