= İsmail Kurt =

Turkish footballer (1934–2017)

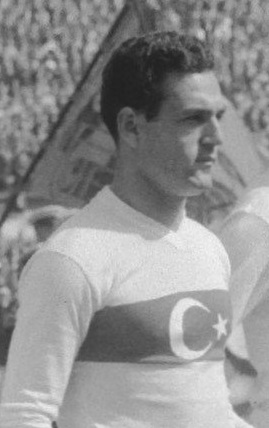

Personal information
- Date of birth: 1 January 1934
- Place of birth: Karakoç, Turkey
- Date of death: 27 February 2017 (aged 83)
- Place of death: Istanbul, Turkey
- Height: 1.69 m (5 ft 7 in)
- Position: Defender

Senior career*
Years	Team	Apps	(Gls)
1956–1960	Galatasaray	64	(0)
1960–1966	Fenerbahçe	116	(0)
1966–1968	Vefa	5	(0)
Total		185	(0)

International career
1957	Turkey B	1	(0)
1958–1965	Turkey	16	(0)
- * Club domestic league appearances and goals

İsmail Kurt (1 January 1934 – 27 February 2017) was a Turkish football player, who played as a defender, and manager. Kurt was best known for his stints with rivals Galatasaray and Fenerbahçe, and with the latter he won three Süper Lig titles.

== Personal life ==
İsmail is the brother of the footballer Metin Kurt.

== Death ==
Kurt died on 27 February 2017 and had a ceremony arranged by Fenerbahçe.

== Honours ==
Galatasaray

- Istanbul Football League: 1957–58

Fenerbahçe

- Süper Lig: 1961–1962, 1963–64, 1964–65
