= Abdullah Avcı =

Turkish footballer and manager

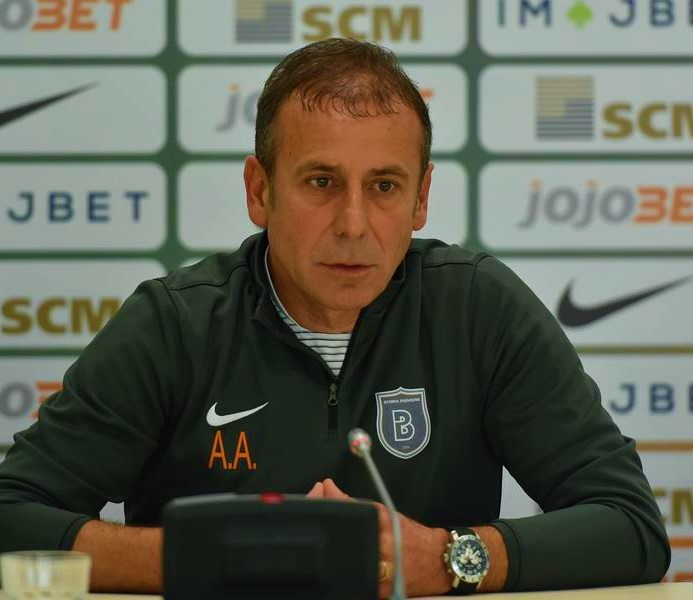
- Avcı in 2016

Personal information
- Full name: Abdullah Mucib Avcı
- Date of birth: 31 July 1963 (age 63)
- Place of birth: Istanbul, Turkey
- Height: 1.80 m (5 ft 11 in)
- Position: Striker

Youth career
- 1979–1980: Vefa

Senior career*
Years	Team	Apps	(Gls)
1984–1986	Fatih Karagümrük	54	(22)
1986–1988	Çaykur Rizespor	61	(22)
1988–1989	Kahramanmaraşspor	16	(5)
1989–1990	Bakırköyspor	0	(0)
1990–1991	Kasımpaşa	30	(16)
1991–1995	İstanbulspor	97	(43)
1995	Küçükçekmece	11	(2)
1996	Nişantaşıspor	12	(3)
1998–1999	Vefa	28	(10)
Total		309	(123)

Managerial career
- 1999–2002: İstanbulspor (assistant)
- 2002–2003: İstanbulspor U21
- 2004: Galatasaray U21
- 2004–2005: Turkey U-17
- 2006–2011: İstanbul Başakşehir
- 2011–2013: Turkey
- 2014–2019: İstanbul Başakşehir
- 2019–2020: Beşiktaş
- 2020–2023: Trabzonspor
- 2023–2024: Trabzonspor
- * Club domestic league appearances and goals

Abdullah Mucib Avcı (Turkish pronunciation: [abdullah mudʒib avdʒɯ]; born 31 July 1963) is a UEFA Pro Licensed Turkish football manager and a former professional footballer.

Avcı's coaching career began at İstanbulspor in 1999 as assistant coach before a spell as Galatasaray youth academy chief. Later, in October 2004, he became the head coach of the Turkey under-17 national football team.

After leaving his position with the national teams in 2006, Avcı started working as a coach at İstanbul Başakşehir. He coached İstanbul Başakşehir until 2011 when he became the head coach of the national team. Between 2011 and 2013, Avcı coached the national team before returning to lead İstanbul Başakşehir again in 2014. He worked at İstanbul Başakşehir from 2014 to 2019 before becoming the head coach of Beşiktaş for the 2019 season.

In the 2020 season, Avcı took over Trabzonspor and led the team to become Süper Lig champions in the 2021–22 season. On 7 March 2023, Avcı announced his resignation from his position.

== Playing career ==
After playing for several football clubs including Vefa, Fatih Karagümrük, Rizespor, Kahramanmaraşspor, Bakırköyspor, and Kasımpaşa, he joined İstanbulspor where he spent the longest time and also served as the team captain.

Following the end of his professional football career in 1999, he completed coaching courses and obtained a Professional License.

== Managerial career ==
=== İstanbulspor ===
He started his coaching career in İstanbulspor, where he played football for a long time, as one of Ziya Doğan's coaches in the 1999–2000 season. Towards the end of the season, he was brought to the head of the team together with football player-manager Aykut Kocaman and coached the team for 7 matches. He worked as Aykut Kocaman's assistant until 2002. He was appointed as the head of the İstanbulspor U–21 team in the 2002–03 season. They came third in the U21 Ligi. In 2003, he took charge as "Youth Development Technical Officer".

=== Galatasaray U–21 ===
At the start of 2004, he began his coaching career with the Galatasaray U–21. During his tenure, he trained notable players such as Arda Turan, Aydın Yılmaz, Uğur Uçar Ferhat Öztorun, Mülayim Erdem, Mehmet Güven, and Cafercan Aksu. In the 2004–05 season, he guided the team to the U21 Ligi championship title.

=== Turkey U–17 ===
On 11 October 2004, he was appointed as the head coach of the Turkey national under-17 football team, beginning his tenure with the 2005 European Under-17 Football Championship qualification. On 15 October 2004 their first international match took place against Armenia, which they won 2–1.

Under his leadership, the team advanced to the elite round of the tournament by finishing in first place in their qualifying group. In the elite round, they won all three matches, but suffered their first defeat against Italy in the tournament. However, they bounced back by defeating England and Belarus to secure the group runner-up spot. In the knockout stage, they defeated Croatia in the semi-finals and Netherlands in the final to become the European Champion for the second time in their history. Tevfik Köse was the top scorer of the tournament, while Nuri Şahin was named the best player. Caner Erkin and Onur Recep Kıvrak were among the team members who would later play for the Turkey national football team.

Their success in the championship qualified them to participate in the 2005 FIFA U-17 World Championship. In their first-ever appearance in the tournament, they won all three group matches and reached the quarter-finals, where they eliminated China. However, they were eliminated in the semi-finals after conceding a goal in the 90th minute. In the match for third place, they lost 2–1 to the Netherlands, finishing in fourth place overall. Throughout his one-year tenure, he coached the team in 27 matches, winning 18, drawing 5, and losing only 4 times.

=== İstanbul Başakşehir (formerly known as Istanbul BB) ===
On 9 August 2006, Avcı left his national team duty and began coaching İstanbul Başakşehir (formerly known as İstanbul BB). In the 2006–07 season, İstanbul Başakşehir (formerly known as Istanbul BB) finished 2nd in the First League and qualified for the Süper Lig in the 2007–08 Süper Lig season. Despite winning 2–0 against Fenerbahçe in their first game, İstanbul Başakşehir (formerly known as Istanbul BB) had a rough start to the season. Even though he received an offer from a team that was the champion in the 2007–08 season, Galatasaray, Avcı chose to remain with İstanbul Başakşehir (formerly known as Istanbul BB) and declined the offer. Avcı led İstanbul Başakşehir (formerly known as Istanbul BB) to finish in the 12th place in the 2007–08 season, 9th place in the 2008–09 season, 6th place in the 2009–10 season, and 12th place in the 2010–11 season in the Süper Lig.

Under Avcı's leadership, İstanbul Başakşehir (formerly known as Istanbul BB) reached the final of the 2010–11 Turkish Cup. However, in the final match against Beşiktaş, they drew in regular time, and Beşiktaş won the cup as a result of penalties. In addition to his successful stint at İstanbul Başakşehir (formerly known as Istanbul BB) Abdullah Avcı received a contract from the Turkey national team. On 18 November 2011 he left İstanbul Başakşehir to join the national team.

=== Turkey national team ===
On 17 November 2011, after Guus Hiddink left his job, he was appointed as the coach of the Turkey national football team, which was vacated. A contract was signed with Avcı until 21 May 2015. Having failed with only 6 wins and 4 draws in 18 matches with the national team, Avcı resigned from his position on 20 August 2013, after the rumours of the search for a new coach were not denied.

=== İstanbul Başakşehir ===
After his stint as coach of the Turkey national football team, Abdullah Avcı returned to İstanbul Başakşehir in the 2014–15. In his first season back, the team finished in 4th place, having achieved 15 wins, 14 draws, and 5 losses in the Süper Lig. In the second season, İstanbul Başakşehir won 16 matches, drew 11 times, and lost 7 times, again finishing in 4th place.

In the 2016–17 season, İstanbul Başakşehir had a strong start, eventually finishing in 2nd place behind champions Beşiktaş. The team continued its success in the 2017–18 season, finishing in 3rd place. In the 2018–19 season, İstanbul Başakşehir finished in 2nd place behind Galatasaray S.K., with a total of 66 points.

During his time with İstanbul Başakşehir, Avcı helped to establish the team as a strong competitor in the Süper Lig. He was known for his tactical acumen and ability to develop young players. However, On 30 June 2019, Avcı parted ways with the club to join the Turkish giants club, Beşiktaş.

=== Beşiktaş ===
On 3 July 2019, Avcı signed a three-year contract with Beşiktaş, one of the biggest football clubs in Turkey. He began his tenure with the team, but his performance and tactics were heavily criticized by the fans who were not satisfied with the team's results and playing style. Despite winning 11 matches at the start of the season, Beşiktaş's performance declined significantly, which led to Avcı's sacking on 25 January 2020, after only seven months as the coach. It is worth noting that the team's disappointing results and the lack of support from the fans played a significant role in Avcı's departure from the club.

=== Trabzonspor (First term) ===
On 10 November 2020 Avcı signed a 2.5-year contract with Trabzonspor. Trabzonspor is a football team based in the city of Trabzon, Turkey. They had not won the Süper Lig championship for 36 years until Avcı's tenure. Avcı led Trabzonspor to win the 2020 Turkish Super Cup on 27 January 2021, and later on 30 April 022, they won the Süper Lig championship three weeks before the end of the 2021–22 season by drawing 2–2 with Antalyaspor. During his time with Trabzonspor, they had a successful home record, as they went unbeaten for 36 home games. However, on 4 March 2023, Trabzonspor lost their first home game under Avcı's management to Ümraniyespor.

On 7 March 2023, Avcı resigned from his position as Trabzonspor coach for personal reasons, leaving behind a successful legacy.

=== Trabzonspor (Second term) ===
On 12 November 2023, Avcı rejoined Trabzonspor as head coach, marking his return to the club after a 216-day absence. During his second term in the 2023–24 season, Avcı led Trabzonspor to significant achievements. The team finished 3rd in the Süper Lig, securing qualification for the UEFA Europa League second qualifying round with a record of 21 wins, 4 draws, and 13 losses, accumulating a total of 67 points. On 23 May 2024, Avcı guided Trabzonspor to the final of the Turkish Cup. Despite a valiant effort, the team suffered a heartbreaking 3–2 defeat to Beşiktaş, conceding a last-minute goal at the Atatürk Olympic Stadium in Istanbul.

Avcı began the 2024–25 season with disappointing results at Trabzonspor. The team struggled in European competitions, being eliminated first from the UEFA Europa League in the third qualifying round after a 3–0 aggregate defeat to Rapid Wien (0–1 at home and 0–2 away). Subsequently, Trabzonspor dropped to the UEFA Conference League, where they faced St. Gallen in the play-off round. After a 0–0 draw in the first leg, Trabzonspor managed only a 1–1 draw in the second leg, eventually losing 5–4 on penalties, resulting in their elimination from European tournaments altogether.

On 31 August 2024, following these setbacks and continued poor performances domestically, Trabzonspor officially parted ways with Avcı during the early stages of the season.

== Career statistics ==
=== Club ===
Club	Season	League			Cup		Total	
Club	Season	Division	Apps	Goals	Apps	Goals	Apps	Goals
Fatih Karagümrük	1984–85	1. Lig	21	5	–		21	5
Fatih Karagümrük	1985–86	1. Lig	33	17	–		33	7
Fatih Karagümrük	Total		54	22	0	0	54	22
Rizespor	1986–87	Süper Lig	29	8	4	1	33	9
Rizespor	1987–88	Süper Lig	8	0	–		8	0
Rizespor	1988–89	Süper Lig	24	14	4	2	28	16
Rizespor	Total		61	22	8	3	69	25
Kahramanmaraşspor	1988–89	Süper Lig	16	5	1	0	17	5
Kahramanmaraşspor	Total		16	5	1	0	17	5
Bakırköyspor	1989–90	1. Lig	–		2	0	2	0
Bakırköyspor	Total		–		2	0	2	0
Kasımpaşa	1990–91	1. Lig	30	16	–		30	16
Kasımpaşa	Total		30	16	0	0	30	16
İstanbulspor	1991–92	2. Lig	34	18	2	1	36	19
İstanbulspor	1992–93	1.Lig	22	7	1	1	23	8
İstanbulspor	1993–94	1.Lig	25	14	5	1	30	15
İstanbulspor	1994–95	1.Lig	16	4	1	0	17	4
İstanbulspor	Total		97	43	8	3	106	46
Küçükçekmece	1995–96	2. Lig	11	2	–		11	2
Küçükçekmece	Total		11	2	0	0	11	2
Nişantaşıspor	1995–96	2. Lig	12	3	–		12	3
Nişantaşıspor	Total		12	3	0	0	12	3
Vefa	1998–99	3. Lig	28	10	–		28	10
Vefa	Total		28	10	0	0	28	10
Career totals			309	123	19	6	328	129

== Managerial statistics ==
Team	From	To	Record				
Team	From	To	G	W	D	L	Win %
İstanbul Başakşehir	8 August 2006	18 November 2011	205	83	48	74	40.49
Turkey	18 November 2011	20 August 2013	18	6	4	8	33.33
İstanbul Başakşehir	18 August 2014	30 June 2019	226	116	71	39	51.33
Beşiktaş	3 July 2019	29 January 2020	28	11	3	14	39.29
Trabzonspor	10 November 2020	7 March 2023	117	64	32	21	54.70
Trabzonspor	12 October 2023	31 August 2024	42	23	7	12	54.76
Total			636	303	165	168	47.64

== Honours ==
=== Managerial honours ===
Trabzonspor

- Süper Lig: 2021–22
- Süper Kupa: 2020, 2022

Turkey national under-17 football team

- UEFA U17 European Championship: 2005
- 2005 FIFA U-17 World Championship: Fourth place

Galatasaray A2

- A2 League: 2005

== See also ==
- List of Turkey national football team managers
