= Yavuz Özkan (footballer) =

Turkish footballer

Personal information
- Full name: Yavuz Özkan
- Date of birth: 19 May 1985 (age 41)
- Place of birth: Denizli, Turkey
- Height: 1.90 m (6 ft 3 in)
- Position: Goalkeeper

Youth career
- 1999–2004: Denizlispor

Senior career*
Years	Team	Apps	(Gls)
2004–2006	Denizli Belediyespor	51	(0)
2006–2013	Bursaspor	16	(0)
2008	→ Tarsus I.Y. (loan)	16	(0)
2013	→ Adanaspor (loan)	7	(0)
2013–2014	Şanlıurfaspor	0	(0)
2014	Denizlispor	0	(0)
2014–2015	Fatih Karagümrük	11	(0)
2015–2016	Kartalspor	16	(0)
2016–2017	Denizli Belediyespor	30	(1)
2017	Kemerspor 2003	9	(0)
2017	Tuzlaspor	3	(0)
- * Club domestic league appearances and goals as of 18 February 2018

Yavuz Özkan (born 19 May 1985) is a Turkish former professional footballer who played as a goalkeeper.

== Life and career ==
Özkan began his career with his hometown club Denizlispor. He signed a youth contract with the club in 1999, but never played a professional match for the club. He was transferred to Denizli Belediyespor in 2004.

Özkan moved to Bursaspor in 2006. He was loaned to Tarsus Idman Yurdu for the second half of the 2007–08 season and was a part of the Bursaspor squad that won the Süper Lig in 2009–10.

== Honours ==
Bursaspor

- Süper Lig: 2009–10
