= Doğan Andaç =

Turkish football manager

Personal information
- Full name: Doğan Recep Andaç
- Date of birth: 1923
- Place of birth: Turkey
- Date of death: 6 February 2013 (aged 91)
- Place of death: Ankara, Turkey

Managerial career
- Years: Team
- 1965: Turkey
- 1965–1966: Denizli Karagücü
- 1977–1978: Diyarbakırspor
- 1978: Turkey
- 1978–1979: Beşiktaş
- 1981–1982: Diyarbakırspor

Doğan Recep Andaç (1923 to 6 February 2013) was a Turkish professional football manager.

== Managerial career ==
Andaç had a couple brief stints managing the Turkey national football team. He was briefly the president of the Turkish Football Federation in 1980. He died on 13 February 2013, and was buried in Ankara, Turkey.
