= Cenk İşler =

Turkish footballer

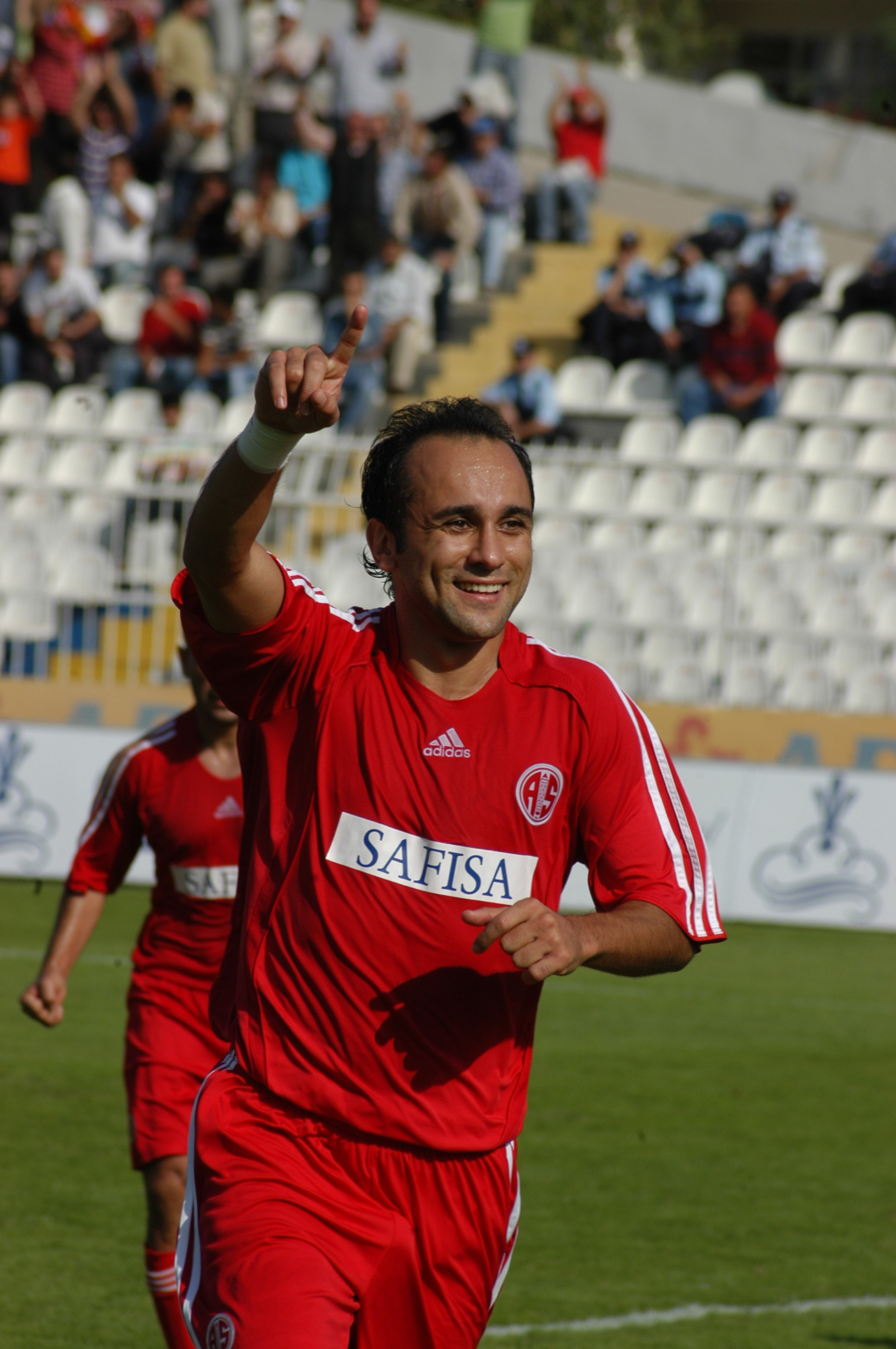

Personal information
- Date of birth: 25 February 1974 (age 52)
- Place of birth: Cologne, Germany
- Height: 1.80 m (5 ft 11 in)
- Position: Forward

Senior career*
| Years | Team | Apps | (Gls) |
| 1992–1993 | Samsunspor | 5 | (0) |
| 1993–1994 | Ünyespor | 26 | (13) |
| 1994–1998 | Samsunspor | 93 | (26) |
| 1998–2001 | Adanaspor | 62 | (33) |
| 2002–2003 | İstanbulspor | 42 | (17) |
| 2003–2004 | Konyaspor | 30 | (12) |
| 2004 | MKE Ankaragücü | 15 | (8) |
| 2005 | Samsunspor | 13 | (7) |
| 2005–2007 | Kayseri Erciyesspor | 63 | (27) |
| 2007–2008 | Antalyaspor | 33 | (19) |
| 2008–2009 | Manisaspor | 32 | (10) |
| 2009–2010 | Kasımpaşa | 26 | (6) |
| 2010–2011 | Samsunspor | 10 | (2) |
| 2011 | Bucaspor | 9 | (0) |
| 2011 | Kasımpaşa | 4 | (0) |
| Total | | 463 | (180) |

International career
| 2000 | Turkey | 1 | (0) |
- * Club domestic league appearances and goals

Cenk Işler (born 25 February 1974) is a retired Turkish international footballer who played as a forward.

== Professional career ==
Cenk spent his entire senior career in Turkey. He was a journeyman who played for various clubs, notably Samsunspor on four occasions, and is one of the few players in Süper Lig to score over 100 career goals.

== International career ==
Cenk was born in Germany to parents of Turkish descent. He made one appearance for the Turkey national football team in a 2–0 win over Moldova on 2 September 2000.
