= Siirtspor =

Turkish sports club

Siirt S.K.
- Full name: Siirt S.K.
- Founded: 1969
- Dissolved: 2020
- Ground: Siirt Atatürk Stadium, Siirt
- Capacity: 7,000
- Chairman: Fadıl Akgündüz
- Manager: Ramazan Çelik
- League: TFF Third League
- 2011–12: 8th
| Home colours | Away colours |

Siirt S.K. was a sports club located in Siirt, Turkey. It was founded as Siirt YSE (Road Water Electricity) in 1969. It was renamed as Siirt Köy Hizmetleri in 1989, as Siirt Jetpa S.K. in 1999 and as Siirt S.K. in 2002.

== League participations ==
- Turkish Super League: 2000–01
- TFF First League: 1985–98, 1999–00, 2001–02
- TFF Second League: 1984–85, 1998–99, 2002–07
- TFF Third League: 2007–2014
- Amateur Leagues: 1969–84, 2014–2020
