= Erzurumspor =

Turkish sports club

- Full name: Erzurumspor
- Founded: 1968
- Dissolved: 2015
- Ground: Cemal Gürsel Stadium, Erzurum
- Capacity: 21,374
- Chairman: Ali Demirhan
Home colours	Away colours

Erzurumspor was a sports club located in Erzurum, Turkey. The football club played in the Turkish Regional Amateur League. The club also played in Turkish First League between 1998 and 2001. It fell into money shortage since 2000 and gradually fell into Second League Category A in 2001 and Second league Category B in 2003. It was finally forced to relegate TFF Third League after not playing an away match at Karsspor on January 31, 2010. Erzurumspor were also relegated from Third League and was dissolved in 2015 and replaced with Erzurum Büyükşehir Belediyespor, which was founded in 1967. Erzurum Büyükşehir Belediyespor was the champion of the 1st Group of Regional Amateur League in 2010–11 season and promoted to the 3rd League.

== League participations ==
- Turkish Super League: 1998–01
- TFF First League: 1973–74, 1979–98, 2001–03
- TFF Second League: 1968–73, 1974–79, 2003–10
- TFF Third League: 2010–11
- Turkish Regional Amateur League: 2011–2014
