= 2020–21 Turkish Cup =

Ziraat Turkish Cup

Tournament details
- Country: Turkey
- Dates: 13 October 2020 – 18 May 2021
- Teams: 145

Final positions
- Champions: Beşiktaş
- Runners-up: Antalyaspor
- Semifinalists: İstanbul Başakşehir; Alanyaspor

The 2020–21 Turkish Cup (Turkish: Türkiye Kupası) was the 59th season of the tournament. Ziraat Bankası was the sponsor of the tournament, thus the sponsored name was Ziraat Turkish Cup. The winners earned a berth in the play-off stage of the 2021–22 UEFA Europa League, and also qualified for the 2021 Turkish Super Cup.

== Competition format ==
Round	Dates	Total Clubs Remaining	Clubs Involved	Winners from Previous Round	New Entries at This Round	Leagues Entering at This Round	Notes
First round	13–15 October 2020	145	42	0	42	all teams in 2019–20 TFF 3rd League groups except those listed in the second round (42)	single leg
Second round	20–22 October 2020	124	46	21	25	teams eliminated in 2019–20 TFF 3rd League play-offs (9); teams ranked 6th to 10th in 2019–20 TFF 3rd League groups (15); best 11th ranked team in 2019–20 TFF 3rd League groups (1)	single leg
Third round	3–5 November 2020	101	86	23	63	all teams in 2020–21 TFF 2nd League groups (39); all teams in 2020–21 TFF 1st League (18); all teams in 2020-21 TFF Super League except those listed in the fourth and fifth rounds (6)	single leg; seeding applied; seeded team play at home
Fourth round	24–26 November 2020	58	52	43	9	teams ranked 7th to 15th in 2019–20 TFF Super League (9)	single leg; seeding applied; seeded team play at home
Fifth round	15–17 December 2020	32	32	26	6	teams ranked 1st to 6th in 2019–20 TFF Super League (6)	single leg; seeding applied; seeded team play at home
Round of 16	12–14 January 2021	16	16	16	0		single leg; seeding applied
Quarter-finals	9–11 February 2021	8	8	8	0		single leg; seeding applied
Semi-finals	16–18 March 2021	4	4	4	0		single leg
Final	18 May 2021	2	2	2	0		single leg

== First round ==
42 Third League teams competed in this round. No seeds were applied in the single-leg round. First and second round draws were made on 2 October 2020. The match schedules were announced on 6 October 2020. The biggest upset was Tekirdağspor (ranked 144th) eliminating Bayrampaşa (ranked 110th). The lowest-ranked team to qualify for the next round was Tekirdağspor (ranked 144th). The highest-ranked team eliminated was Halide Edib Adıvar (ranked 104th).

13 October 2020	Çarşambaspor	0–1	Yozgatspor 1959 FK	Samsun
13:00			Şahanbaz 71'	Stadium: Çarşamba

13 October 2020	Altındağ	1–2	Çankaya FK	Ankara
14:30	Günel 27'		Delimehmet 19'; Safi 81'	Stadium: Çubuk İlçe

13 October 2020	Bergama Belediyespor	1–0	Manisaspor	İzmir
15:30	Yılmaz 68'			Stadium: Bergama 14 Eylül

14 October 2020	Mardin Fosfat Spor	0–3	Siirt İl Özel İdare	Mardin
13:00			Altınay 6'; Erel 23'; Erel 63'	Stadium: 21 Kasım

14 October 2020	Arnavutköy Belediye	2–0	Çengelköyspor A.Ş.	Istanbul
13:30	Demir 13'; Demir 20'			Stadium: Silivri

14 October 2020	Elazığ Karakoçan FK	1–0	Batman Petrolspor	Elazig
13:30	Çakır 44'			Stadium: Doğukent

14 October 2020	Fatsa Belediyespor	1–2	Yomraspor	Ordu
13:30	Bolat 54'		Sezer 23'; Aydın 58'	Stadium: Fatsa İlçe

14 October 2020	İskenderun Futbol Kulübü	2–2 (a.e.t.) (3–4 p)	Payasspor	Hatay
13:30	Yamaç 52'; Temir 97' (pen.)		Kurt 21' (pen.); Yenilmez 92'	Stadium: Payas İlçe

14 October 2020	Kestelspor	2–0	Karaman Belediyespor	Antalya
13:30	Özdemir 20'; Yünkuş 77'			Stadium: Alanya Milli Egemenlik

14 October 2020	Kırıkkale Büyük Anadoluspor	2–1	Gölcükspor	Kirikkale
13:30	Yanmaz 32'; Kongur 61'		Avcı 71'	Stadium: Başpınar

14 October 2020	Kozan Spor FK	2–1	Kahta 02 Spor	Adana
13:30	Yurtseven 15'; Çimen 75'		Karaca 28'	Stadium: İsmet Atlı

14 October 2020	Şile Yıldızspor	5–1	Modafen	Istanbul
13:30	Hacımustafaoğlu 46'; Atalay 61'; Hacımustafaoğlu 72'; Taşkara 77'; Hacımustafaoğlu 81'		Demir 28'	Stadium: Şile İlçe

14 October 2020	Yalovaspor	1–1 (a.e.t.) (5–3 p)	Halide Edib Adıvar	Yalova
13:30	Demirel 26'		Üçüncü 43'	Stadium: Yalova Atatürk

14 October 2020	Yeşilyurt Belediyespor	1–0	Adıyaman 1954 SK	Malatya
13:30	Akman 55'			Stadium: Malatya Yeşiltepe

14 October 2020	1877 Alemdağspor	1–0 (a.e.t.)	Edirnespor	Istanbul
13:30	Çimen 100'			Stadium: Alemdağ

14 October 2020	Belediye Kütahyaspor	1–0	Bursa Yıldırımspor	Kutahya
15:00	Güneri 63'			Stadium: Kütahya Dumlupınar

14 October 2020	Tekirdağspor	2–1 (a.e.t.)	Bayrampaşa	Tekirdag
15:00	Küçük 39'; Çakır 105'		Güler 90+4'	Stadium: Namık Kemal

14 October 2020	İçel İdmanyurdu Spor	1–1 (a.e.t.) (5–4 p)	Ceyhanspor	Mersin
19:00	Ayan 14'		Çapar 6'	Stadium: Mersin
	Penalties
	Çetin (penalty scored); Köse (penalty missed); Tosun (penalty scored); Ergül (penalty scored); Önder (penalty scored); Gök (penalty scored)		(penalty scored) Yıldırım; (penalty scored) Ceylan; (penalty missed) Temel; (penalty scored) Şahbaz; (penalty scored) Çaydemir; (penalty missed) Asal

15 October 2020	52 Orduspor FK	3–2	Arhavispor	Ordu
13:00	Yüksel 4' (pen.); Akyildiz 13'; Kayahan 89'		Terzi 57'; Terzi 90+3'	Stadium: 19 Eylül

15 October 2020	Tokatspor	1–2	Erbaaspor	Tokat
14:30	Yükseker 68'		Özçakır 35'; Üstün 45+2'	Stadium: Tokat Gaziosmanpaşa

15 October 2020	Isparta 32 Spor	3–2 (a.e.t.)	Kemerspor 2003	Isparta
19:00	Çelik 36' (o.g.); Serim 63'; Geçgin 111'		Ataç 42' (pen.); Birşen 90+6' (o.g.)	Stadium: Isparta Atatürk

== Second round ==
46 Third League teams competed in this round. No seeds were applied in the single-leg round. First and second round draws were made on 2 October 2020. The match schedules were announced on 6 October 2020. The biggest upset was Tekirdağspor (ranked 144th) eliminating Silivrispor (ranked 98th). The lowest-ranked team to qualify for the next round was Tekirdağspor (ranked 144th). The highest-ranked team eliminated was 1928 Bucaspor (ranked 82nd).

20 October 2020	Belediye Kütahyaspor	1–2	Darıca Gençlerbirliği	Kutahya
14:30	Nalbantoğlu 55'		Özer 25'; Sevinç 85'	Stadium: Kütahya Dumlupınar

20 October 2020	İçel İdmanyurdu Spor	6–0	Payasspor	Mersin
17:00	Gök 13'; Ayhan 20'; Ayan 30'; Çetin 42' (pen.); Özdemir 70'; Tosun 90'			Stadium: Mersin

20 October 2020	Karşıyaka	3–0	Bergama Belediyespor	İzmir
20:00	Demirbilek 1'; Duman 60'; Kara 86'			Stadium: İzmir Atatürk

21 October 2020	Elazığ Karakoçan FK	1–2	Diyarbekirspor	Elazig
13:00	Çakır 10'		Turantaylak 5'; Turantaylak 32'	Stadium: Doğukent

21 October 2020	Esenler Erokspor	3–3 (a.e.t.) (4–2 p)	Arnavutköy Belediye	Istanbul
13:00	Afkan 40'; Toplu 95'; Türker 102'		Demir 61'; Aydın 112'; Aydın 113'	Stadium: Esenler
	Penalties
	Toplu (penalty scored); Türker (penalty scored); Sarıkaya (penalty scored)		(penalty scored) Caymaz; (penalty scored) Şahingöz

21 October 2020	1954 Kelkit Bld.Spor	0–1	Artvin Hopaspor	Gumushane
13:30			Dalgıç 59'	Stadium: Kelkit İlçe

21 October 2020	Çatalcaspor	0–1 (a.e.t.)	Şile Yıldızspor	Istanbul
13:30			Çarkçı 115'	Stadium: Ziya Altınoğlu

21 October 2020	Cizrespor	2–1	Siirt İl Özel İdare	Sirnak
13:30	Sütçü 39' (pen.); Özdemir 85'		Özer 58' (pen.)	Stadium: Cizre Hamit Özalp

21 October 2020	Isparta 32 Spor	0–1	Kestelspor	Isparta
13:30			Özdemir 90+2' (pen.)	Stadium: Isparta Atatürk

21 October 2020	Kırıkkale Büyük Anadoluspor	1–1 (a.e.t.) (4–5 p)	Düzcespor	Kirikkale
13:30	Çift 80'		Bilen 18'	Stadium: Başpınar
	Penalties
	Avcı (penalty scored); Zeytin (penalty scored); Başar (penalty scored); Gürbüz (penalty scored)		(penalty scored) Akyel; (penalty scored) Bilen; (penalty scored) Kaya; (penalty scored) Sezgin; (penalty scored) Çelik

21 October 2020	Muğlaspor	1–1 (a.e.t.) (3–1 p)	Kızılcabölükspor	Mugla
13:30	Sungur 83'		Yıldırımlı 26'	Stadium: Muğla Atatürk

21 October 2020	Nevşehir Belediyespor	1–0	Kozan Spor FK	Nevsehir
13:30	Yeşilmen 8'			Stadium: Nevşehir Gazi

21 October 2020	Ofspor	0–1	Yomraspor	Trabzon
13:30			Öksüz 77'	Stadium: Vali İsmet Gürbüz Civelek

21 October 2020	Sultanbeyli Bld.	1–0	Yalovaspor	Istanbul
13:30	Gevençli 80'			Stadium: Sultanbeyli Gölet Futbol

21 October 2020	68 Aksaray Belediyespor	3–2 (a.e.t.)	Yeşilyurt Belediyespor	Aksaray
14:30	Tutcuoğlu 90'; Şerifoğlu 105' (pen.); Tutcuoğlu 120+1' (pen.)		Ateş 46'; Çelik 110'	Stadium: Dağılgan

21 October 2020	Tekirdağspor	2–1	Silivrispor	Tekirdag
15:00	Çakır 45'; Şenol 62'		Acı 28'	Stadium: Namık Kemal

21 October 2020	Fethiyespor	2–1	Nazilli Belediyespor	Mugla
19:00	Alkan 30'; Gir 90+5'		Bölükbaşı 21' (pen.)	Stadium: Fethiye İlçe

22 October 2020	Ağrı 1970 Spor	1–2	52 Orduspor FK	Agri
13:00	Soydan 16'		Aydaş 20'; Aydaş 60'	Stadium: Vali Lütfü Yiğenoğlu

22 October 2020	Erbaaspor	0–1	Yozgatspor 1959 FK	Tokat
13:00			Emircan 57'	Stadium: Erbaa İlçe

22 October 2020	Büyükçekmece Tepecikspor	1–0	1877 Alemdağspor	Istanbul
13:30	Altıntaş 88'			Stadium: Tepecik Şenol Güneş

22 October 2020	Karaköprü Belediyespor	1–0	Osmaniyespor FK	Sanliurfa
13:30	Sari 15' (pen.)			Stadium: Faruk Çelik

22 October 2020	Belediye Derincespor	3–0	Çankaya FK	Kocaeli
15:00	Yılmaz 25'; Yılmaz 86'; Bağlı 90+2'			Stadium: Belediye Derincespor Doğal Çim

22 October 2020	1928 Bucaspor	0–1	Somaspor	İzmir
19:00			Aydın 38'	Stadium: Yeni Buca

== Third round ==
6 Super League, 18 First League, 39 Second League and 23 Third League teams competed in this round. Seeds were applied in the single-leg round. The draw was made on 23 October 2020. The match schedules were announced on 26 October 2020. 5 teams (83%) from Super League, 12 teams (67%) from First League, 22 teams (56%) from Second League and 4 teams (17%) from Third League qualified for the next round. 29 seeded (67%) and 14 unseeded (33%) teams qualified for the next round. The biggest upset was Kocaelispor (ranked 73rd) eliminating MKE Ankaragücü (ranked 18th). The lowest-ranked team to qualify for the next round was Darıca Gençlerbirliği (ranked 101st). The highest-ranked team eliminated was MKE Ankaragücü (ranked 18th).

=== Teams ===
Seeded	League	Rank	Unseeded	League	Rank
Yeni Malatyaspor	SL	16	Sivas Belediyespor	2L	59
Kayserispor	SL	17	Hacettepe Spor	2L	60
MKE Ankaragücü	SL	18	Bayburt Özel İdare Spor	2L	61
Hatayspor	SL	19	1922 Konyaspor	2L	62
BB Erzurumspor	SL	20	Kırklarelispor	2L	63
Fatih Karagümrük	SL	21	Eyüpspor	2L	64
Adana Demirspor	1L	22	Mamak FK	2L	65
Akhisarspor	1L	23	Etimesgut Belediyespor	2L	66
Bursaspor	1L	24	Amed Sportif	2L	67
Altay	1L	25	Niğde Anadolu FK	2L	68
Ankara Keçiörengücü	1L	26	Gümüşhanespor	2L	69
Ümraniyespor	1L	27	Elazığspor	2L	70
Menemenspor	1L	28	Kardemir Karabükspor	2L	71
Giresunspor	1L	29	Şanlıurfaspor	2L	72
İstanbulspor	1L	30	Kocaelispor	2L	73
Balıkesirspor	1L	31	Karacabey Belediyespor	2L	74
Altınordu	1L	32	Serik Belediyespor	2L	75
Boluspor	1L	33	24Erzincanspor	2L	76
Ankaraspor	1L	34	Turgutluspor	2L	77
Adanaspor	1L	35	Pazarspor	2L	78
Eskişehirspor	1L	36	Belediye Derincespor	3L	79
Samsunspor	1L	37	Somaspor	3L	80
Bandırmaspor	1L	38	68 Aksaray Belediyespor	3L	81
Tuzlaspor	1L	39	Esenler Erokspor	3L	83
Manisa FK	2L	40	Nevşehir Belediyespor	3L	84
Ankara Demirspor	2L	41	Artvin Hopaspor	3L	85
Hekimoğlu Trabzon	2L	42	Karşıyaka	3L	86
Kastamonuspor	2L	43	Muğlaspor	3L	87
Sancaktepe FK	2L	44	Düzcespor	3L	88
Sakaryaspor	2L	45	Büyükçekmece Tepecikspor	3L	90
İnegölspor	2L	46	Karaköprü Belediyespor	3L	91
Kırşehir Belediyespor	2L	47	Diyarbakırspor	3L	95
Afjet Afyonspor	2L	48	Fethiyespor	3L	96
Van Spor	2L	49	Cizrespor	3L	99
Tarsus İdman Yurdu	2L	50	Sultanbeyli Bld.	3L	100
Uşak Spor	2L	51	Darıca Gençlerbirliği	3L	101
Pendikspor	2L	52	Yomraspor	3L	106
Kahramanmaraşspor	2L	53	Yozgatspor 1959 FK	3L	107
Sarıyer	2L	54	52 Orduspor FK	3L	109
Ergene Velimeşe	2L	55	Şile Yıldızspor	3L	116
Zonguldak Kömürspor	2L	56	İçel İdmanyurdu Spor	3L	129
BB Bodrumspor	2L	57	Kestelspor	3L	134
Çorum FK	2L	58	Tekirdağspor	3L	144

=== Results ===
3 November 2020	Balıkesirspor	2–2 (a.e.t.) (5–6 p)	Esenler Erokspor	Balikesir
13:00	Aynaoğlu 7'; Taşdemir 51' (pen.)		Soy 60'; Nwankwo 90+3' (o.g.)	Stadium: Balıkesir Atatürk
	Penalties
	Mrsic (penalty scored); Aynaoğlu (penalty scored); Bilalli (penalty scored); Güncü (penalty missed); Yüksek (penalty missed); Kore (penalty scored); Aydoğdu (penalty scored); Kayalı (penalty missed)		(penalty missed) Alkan; (penalty scored) Somay; (penalty scored) Türker; (penalty scored) Sarıkaya; (penalty missed) Öner; (penalty scored) Taşkın; (penalty scored) Afkan; (penalty scored) Furat

3 November 2020	Tuzlaspor	2–1	Bayburt Özel İdarespor	Istanbul
13:00	Zubanovic 28'; Özcan 84'		Üstün 90+4'	Stadium: Tuzla Belediye

3 November 2020	Adanaspor	2–1	68 Aksaray Belediyespor	Adana
15:30	Papaker 45+2'; Roni 70'		Kahrıman 17'	Stadium: Adana 5 Ocak Fatih Terim

3 November 2020	Altay	0–2	1922 Konyaspor	İzmir
15:30			Özkayımoğlu 61'; Gölpek 67'	Stadium: Bornova Aziz Kocaoğlu

3 November 2020	BB Erzurumspor	6–2	Karaköprü Belediyespor	Erzurum
18:00	Muhammed 8'; Albayrak 34'; Hamroun 43'; Mina 45'; Obertan 47'; Obertan 55'		Okur 51'; Okur 73'	Stadium: Erzurum Kazım Karabekir

3 November 2020	MKE Ankaragücü	1–2	Kocaelispor	Ankara
20:30	Bolingi 74'		Yiğit 51'; Karakaş 90+5'	Stadium: Eryaman

4 November 2020	Ankara Keçiörengücü	6–0	Büyükçekmece Tepecikspor	Ankara
13:00	Dodoo 2'; Keçelioğlu 61'; Manaj 70'; Babaoğlu 80'; Babaoğlu 88'; Manaj 90+3'			Stadium: Aktepe

4 November 2020	Ankaraspor	3–1	Pazarspor	Ankara
13:00	Kızılkaya 42'; Doğru 89'; Doğru 90+6'		Aydın 90+3'	Stadium: Osmanlı

4 November 2020	Bandırmaspor	3–1	Belediye Derincespor	Balikesir
13:00	Rayo 11'; Rayo 27'; Satılmış 38'		Serbest 67'	Stadium: Bandırma 17 Eylül

4 November 2020	Boluspor	2–1	Hacettepe Spor	Bolu
13:00	Gür 77'; Keten 87'		Karadağ 49'	Stadium: Bolu Atatürk

4 November 2020	Giresunspor	2–0	Tekirdağspor	Giresun
13:00	Milinkovic 13'; Ertürk 16'			Stadium: Giresun Atatürk

4 November 2020	Menemenspor	1–1 (a.e.t.) (8–9 p)	24Erzincanspor	İzmir
13:00	Talum 53'		Karakoç 70'	Stadium: Menemen İlçe
	Penalties
	Çalış (penalty scored); Koçak (penalty scored); Buğan (penalty scored); Bayır (penalty scored); Kamara (penalty scored); Avcı (penalty scored); Aytemiz (penalty scored); Arı (penalty scored); Talum (penalty missed)		(penalty scored) Özgen; (penalty scored) Akgün; (penalty scored) Taşdelen; (penalty scored) Sönmez; (penalty scored) Karakoç; (penalty scored) Akbulut; (penalty scored) Türker; (penalty scored) Daşdemir; (penalty scored) Demir

4 November 2020	Ümraniyespor	0–1	Kırklarelispor	Istanbul
13:00			Aslıyüksek 86'	Stadium: Ümraniye Belediyesi Şehir

4 November 2020	Hekimoğlu Trabzon	2–1	52 Orduspor FK	Trabzon
13:00	Kara 55'; Eşer 90+2'		Akyildiz 42'	Stadium: Ortahisar Yavuz Selim

4 November 2020	Manisa FK	2–0	Gümüşhanespor	Manisa
13:00	Okumak 5'; Okumak 81'			Stadium: Mümin Özkasap

4 November 2020	Adana Demirspor	3–1	Kestelspor	Adana
15:30	Şahintürk 19'; Karaer 40'; Alkan 49'		Görgülü 80'	Stadium: Adana 5 Ocak Fatih Terim

4 November 2020	Altınordu	2–1	Fethiyespor	İzmir
15:30	İnce 50'; Yener 59'		An 39'	Stadium: Bornova Aziz Kocaoğlu

4 November 2020	Fatih Karagümrük	2–2 (a.e.t.) (4–3 p)	Nevşehir Belediyespor	Istanbul
15:30	Pehlivan 31'; Altınay 104'		Taşdemir 30'; Torun 97'	Stadium: Vefa
	Penalties
	Erdem (penalty scored); Sobiech (penalty missed); Chahechouhe (penalty scored); Altınay (penalty scored); Ndao (penalty scored)		(penalty scored) Bedir; (penalty scored) Kaya; (penalty missed) Özdemir; (penalty scored) Işık; (penalty missed) Hacıhafızoğlu

4 November 2020	Kayserispor	5–0	Yomraspor	Kayseri
18:00	Ackah 27'; Demir 31'; Demir 37'; Çapar 45+5'; Alibec 54'			Stadium: Kayseri Büyükşehir Belediyesi Kadir Has

4 November 2020	Bursaspor	1–1 (a.e.t.) (7–6 p)	Karşıyaka	Bursa
20:30	Çavuşluk 48'		Atalay 81'	Stadium: Bursa Büyükşehir Belediye
	Penalties
	Köz (penalty scored); Aydın (penalty scored); Kurtuluş (penalty scored); Altındiş (penalty scored); Ünver (penalty scored); Görgüc (penalty scored); Yılmaz (penalty scored)		(penalty scored) Kınay; (penalty scored) Çelik; (penalty scored) Atalay; (penalty scored) Demirbilek; (penalty scored) Karapınar; (penalty scored) Kara; (penalty missed) Yılmaz

5 November 2020	Afjet Afyonspor	2–1	Kardemir Karabükspor	Afyon
13:00	Kasal 36' (pen.); Keklik 59'		Kervamkıran 88'	Stadium: Zafer

5 November 2020	Ankara Demirspor	2–0	Mamak FK	Ankara
13:00	Yılmaz 40'; Özdemir 71'			Stadium: TCDD Ankara Demirspor

5 November 2020	Bodrumspor	2–2 (a.e.t.) (7–8 p)	Niğde Anadolu FK	Mugla
13:00	Sol 61'; Dumanlı 103'		Yıldırım 39'; Aktay 113'	Stadium: Bodrum İlçe
	Penalties
	Türk (penalty scored); Aktaş (penalty missed); Yıldızhan (penalty scored); Fındık (penalty scored); Sol (penalty scored); Subaş (penalty scored); Dumanlı (penalty scored); Karagöl (penalty scored); Değişmez (penalty missed)		(penalty scored) Yılmaz; (penalty scored) Özyaşar; (penalty missed) Aktay; (penalty scored) Candemir; (penalty scored) Samancı; (penalty scored) Altunbaş; (penalty scored) Sayar; (penalty scored) Akyüz; (penalty scored) Çolakoğlu

5 November 2020	Çorum FK	3–0	Eyüpspor	Corum
13:00	Ötkün 11'; Ötkün 62'; Kurumuş 65'			Stadium: Çorum Şehir

5 November 2020	Ergene Velimeşe	0–3	Karacabey Belediyespor	Tekirdag
13:00			Türk 3'; Aydın 44'; Türk 48'	Stadium: Mustafa Kemal Atatürk

5 November 2020	Kahramanmaraşspor	2–0	Somaspor	Kahramanmaras
13:00	Zorlu 20'; Türköz 73'			Stadium: 12 Şubat

5 November 2020	İnegölspor	2–2 (a.e.t.) (1–4 p)	Sultanbeyli Bld.	Bursa
13:00	Taşkesen 77'; Taşkesen 105'		Yeşilördek 51'; Bulut 110'	Stadium: İnegöl İlçe
	Penalties
	Taşkesen (penalty scored); Seçgin (penalty missed); Aydemir (penalty missed)		(penalty scored) Bulut; (penalty scored) Gevençli; (penalty scored) Arslantürk; (penalty scored) Yeşilördek

5 November 2020	Kırşehir Belediyespor	2–1 (a.e.t.)	Yozgatspor 1959 FK	Kirsehir
13:00	Alaeddinoğlu 90+6'; Kucık 91'		Kızıltan 43'	Stadium: Kırşehir Ahi

5 November 2020	Kastamonuspor 1966	1–0 (a.e.t.)	Amed S.K.	Kastamonu
13:00	Cici 98'			Stadium: Kastamonu Gazi

5 November 2020	Pendikspor	w/o	Düzcespor	Istanbul
13:00				Stadium: Pendik

5 November 2020	Samsunspor	1–3	Muğlaspor	Samsun
13:00	İlkin 29'		Köse 30'; Köse 38'; Yeniler 55'	Stadium: Yeni 19 Mayıs

5 November 2020	Sancaktepe FK	2–2 (a.e.t.) (2–3 p)	Serik Belediyespor	Istanbul
13:00	Örnek 23'; Örnek 109'		Eser 38' (pen.); Eser 118'	Stadium: 15 Temmuz
	Penalties
	Şentürk (penalty scored); Kılınç (penalty scored); Örnek (penalty missed); Tırpancı (penalty missed); Derin (penalty missed)		(penalty scored) Özkan; (penalty scored) Eser; (penalty missed) Çelik; (penalty scored) Çapkan

5 November 2020	Sarıyer	2–4	Turgutluspor	Istanbul
13:00	Acer 4'; Yaman 90+8'		Günhan 20' (pen.); Doğan 39'; Doğan 60'; Beşir 70'	Stadium: Sarıyer Yusuf Ziya Öniş

5 November 2020	Tarsus İdman Yurdu	3–1	İçel İdmanyurdu Spor	Mersin
13:00	Kaya 22'; Ademoğlu 45+2'; Durmuş 90+5'		Pekdemir 77'	Stadium: Tarsus İlçe

5 November 2020	Uşakspor	6–0	Şile Yıldızspor	Usak
13:00	Öz 10'; Bektaş 12'; Bektaş 15'; Durmuş 23'; Öz 61'; Öz 90'			Stadium: Uşak 1 Eylül

5 November 2020	Van Spor	1–2	Sivas Belediyespor	Van
13:00	Özdemir 54'		Öztep 40'; Kılıçoğlu 90+3'	Stadium: Van Atatürk Şehir

5 November 2020	Zonguldak Kömürspor	2–3	Darıca Gençlerbirliği	Zonguldak
13:00	Pop 60'; Gökmen 90+1' (pen.)		Tiryakioglu 29'; Eyüpoğlu 45'; Akdeniz 76' (o.g.)	Stadium: Devrek İlçe

5 November 2020	Akhisarspor	0–0 (a.e.t.) (4–5 p)	Etimesgut Belediyespor	Manisa
15:30				Stadium: Spor Toto Akhisar
	Penalties
	Bayar (penalty scored); Bjarnason (penalty scored); Yalçıner (penalty scored); Vrsajevic (penalty scored); Çekdar (penalty missed); Hadzic (penalty missed); Keleş (penalty missed)		(penalty missed) Tur; (penalty scored) Koçak; (penalty scored) Ceylan; (penalty scored) Tosun; (penalty scored) Taşcı; (penalty missed) Yılmaz; (penalty scored) Arslan

5 November 2020	Eskişehirspor	3–2	Cizrespor	Eskisehir
15:30	Erdoğan 37'; Arı 88'; Yakut 90+2'		Doğan 9'; Kerçin 11'	Stadium: Eskişehir Yeni

5 November 2020	İstanbulspor	3–2	Elazığspor	Istanbul
15:30	Yeşil 14'; Zeybek 45+7' (pen.); Özer 48'		Yıldız 22' (pen.); Poyrazlı 37'	Stadium: Esenyurt Necmi Kadıoğlu

5 November 2020	Sakaryaspor	2–0	Diyarbekirspor	Sakarya
15:30	Ünsal 26'; Boztepe 90+2'			Stadium: Yeni Sakarya Atatürk

5 November 2020	Yeni Malatyaspor	2–0	Artvin Hopaspor	Malatya
18:00	Acquah 66'; Topalli 79'			Stadium: Malatya Yeni

5 November 2020	Hatayspor	2–1	Şanlıurfaspor	Hatay
20:30	Aydın 26' (pen.); Barbosa 75'		Emir 84'	Stadium: Antakya Atatürk

== Fourth round ==
14 Super League, 12 First League, 22 Second League and 4 Third League teams competed in this round. Seeds were applied in the single-leg round. The draw was made on 6 November 2020. The match schedules were announced on 9 November 2020. 10 teams (73%) from Super League, 8 teams (67%) from First League, 5 teams (23%) from Second League and 3 teams (75%) from Third League qualified for the next round. 18 seeded (69%) and 8 unseeded (31%) teams qualified for the next round. Biggest upsets were Turgutluspor (ranked 77th) eliminating Denizlispor (ranked 14th) and Darıca Gençlerbirliği (ranked 101st) eliminating Bandırmaspor (ranked 38th). Lowest-ranked team qualifying for the next round was Darıca Gençlerbirliği (ranked 101st). Highest-ranked team eliminated was Denizlispor (ranked 14th).

=== Teams ===
Seeded	League	Rank	Unseeded	League	Rank
Fenerbahçe	SL	7	Manisa FK	2L	40
Gaziantep FK	SL	8	Ankara Demirspor	2L	41
Antalyaspor	SL	9	Hekimoğlu Trabzon	2L	42
Kasımpaşa	SL	10	Kastamonuspor	2L	43
Göztepe	SL	11	Sakaryaspor	2L	45
Gençlerbirliği	SL	12	Kırşehir Belediyespor	2L	47
Konyaspor	SL	13	Afjet Afyonspor	2L	48
Denizlispor	SL	14	Tarsus İdman Yurdu	2L	50
Çaykur Rizespor	SL	15	Uşak Spor	2L	51
Yeni Malatyaspor	SL	16	Pendikspor	2L	52
Kayserispor	SL	17	Kahramanmaraşspor	2L	53
Hatayspor	SL	19	Çorum FK	2L	58
BB Erzurumspor	SL	20	Sivas Belediyespor	2L	59
Fatih Karagümrük	SL	21	1922 Konyaspor	2L	62
Adana Demirspor	1L	22	Kırklarelispor	2L	63
Bursaspor	1L	24	Etimesgut Belediyespor	2L	66
Ankara Keçiörengücü	1L	26	Niğde Anadolu FK	2L	68
Giresunspor	1L	29	Kocaelispor	2L	73
İstanbulspor	1L	30	Karacabey Belediyespor	2L	74
Altınordu	1L	32	Serik Belediyespor	2L	75
Boluspor	1L	33	24Erzincanspor	2L	76
Ankaraspor	1L	34	Turgutluspor	2L	77
Adanaspor	1L	35	Esenler Erokspor	3L	83
Eskişehirspor	1L	36	Muğlaspor	3L	87
Bandırmaspor	1L	38	Sultanbeyli Bld.	3L	100
Tuzlaspor	1L	39	Darıca Gençlerbirliği	3L	101

=== Results ===
24 November 2020	Gençlerbirliği	1–0	Kırşehir Belediyespor	Ankara
13:00	Dikmen 61'			Stadium: Eryaman

24 November 2020	Ankaraspor	1–1 (a.e.t.) (0–3 p)	Muğlaspor	Ankara
14:30	Doğru 21'		Yılmaz 79'	Stadium: Osmanlı
	Penalties
	Akkan (penalty missed); Başkan (penalty missed); Doğru (penalty missed)		(penalty missed) Yıldırım; (penalty scored) Sungur; (penalty scored) Canbirdi; (penalty scored) Ertek

24 November 2020	Boluspor	2–1 (a.e.t.)	Kahramanmaraşspor	Bolu
14:30	Sazdağı 76'; Gür 109'		Uysal 73'	Stadium: Bolu Atatürk

24 November 2020	Giresunspor	1–1 (a.e.t.) (8–7 p)	Niğde Anadolu FK	Giresun
14:30	Ertürk 120'		Yemişci 118'	Stadium: Giresun Atatürk
	Penalties
	Piçinciol (penalty scored); Diarra (penalty scored); Ertürk (penalty scored); Kalafat (penalty scored); Traore (penalty scored); Bilazer (penalty scored); Tavares (penalty scored); Aydın (penalty scored)		(penalty scored) Yemişci; (penalty scored) Yılmaz; (penalty scored) Altunbaş; (penalty scored) Çolakoğlu; (penalty scored) Samancı; (penalty scored) Aydın; (penalty scored) Özyaşar; (penalty missed) Akyüz

24 November 2020	Denizlispor	1–2	Turgutluspor	Denizli
15:00	Sacko 53'		Beşir 8'; Özkara 69'	Stadium: Denizli Atatürk

24 November 2020	Fatih Karagümrük	0–3	Esenler Erokspor	Istanbul
17:00			Dağlı 14'; Kızılgün 35'; Sarıkaya 75'	Stadium: Vefa

24 November 2020	Adanaspor	2–2 (a.e.t.) (4–3 p)	Sakaryaspor	Adana
19:00	Papaker 35'; Alptekin 115'		Solmaz 30' (pen.); Boztepe 112'	Stadium: Adana 5 Ocak Fatih Terim
	Penalties
	Yüksel (penalty scored); Alptekin (penalty scored); Çiçek (penalty scored); Aksu (penalty scored); Roni (penalty missed)		(penalty scored) Özgün; (penalty missed) Kayar; (penalty scored) Koca; (penalty scored) Reis; (penalty missed) Arslan

24 November 2020	Bursaspor	1–0	1922 Konyaspor	Bursa
19:00	Akgün 45+1'			Stadium: Bursa Büyükşehir Belediye

24 November 2020	Fenerbahçe	4–0	Sivas Belediyespor	Istanbul
21:00	Thiam 41'; Pelkas 63'; Thiam 68'; Ademi 73'			Stadium: Ülker

25 November 2020	Ankara Keçiörengücü	1–2 (a.e.t.)	Kocaelispor	Ankara
13:00	Solmaz 82'		Köse 45+2'; Akpınar 97'	Stadium: Aktepe

25 November 2020	Bandırmaspor	0–1	Darıca Gençlerbirliği	Balikesir
13:00			Tiryakioglu 40'	Stadium: Bandırma 17 Eylül

25 November 2020	Tuzlaspor	5–1	Sultanbeyli Bld.	Istanbul
13:00	Sarr 24'; Aosman 40'; Bora 45+1'; Yazar 48'; Özcan 60'		Yeşilördek 73'	Stadium: Tuzla Belediye

25 November 2020	Yeni Malatyaspor	2–0	Etimesgut Belediyespor	Malatya
13:00	Bulut 52'; Tetteh 90+4'			Stadium: Yeni Malatya

25 November 2020	Altınordu	w/o	Çorum FK	İzmir
14:30				Stadium: Bornova Aziz Kocaoğlu

25 November 2020	Eskişehirspor	2–0	Kastamonuspor	Eskisehir
14:30	Alimi 48'; Altunbaş 82' (pen.)			Stadium: Eskişehir Yeni

25 November 2020	İstanbulspor	0–1	Tarsus İdman Yurdu	Istanbul
14:30			Hırçın 20'	Stadium: Esenyurt Necmi Kadıoğlu

25 November 2020	Hatayspor	2–2 (a.e.t.) (4–5 p)	Karacabey Belediyespor	Hatay
15:00	Örnek 25'; Akintola 80'		Taşkın 20'; Çetinbaş 63'	Stadium: Antakya Atatürk
	Penalties
	Traore (penalty scored); Aydın (penalty missed); Boupendza (penalty missed); Canlı (penalty scored); Ouali (penalty scored); Akintola (penalty scored); Abdioğlu (penalty missed)		(penalty missed) Yılmazer; (penalty scored) Aydın; (penalty scored) Taşkın; (penalty scored) Değirmenci; (penalty missed) Çetinbaş; (penalty scored) Yılmaztürk; (penalty scored) Kartal

25 November 2020	Gaziantep FK	3–0	Serik Belediyespor	Gaziantep
17:00	Andre 20'; Mirallas 72'; Demir 76'			Stadium: Kalyon

25 November 2020	Adana Demirspor	4–1	Afjet Afyonspor	Adana
19:00	Zengin 15'; Şahintürk 40'; Uslu 59'; Altıntaş 76'		Taşdemir 45'	Stadium: Adana 5 Ocak Fatih Terim

25 November 2020	Antalyaspor	2–0	Pendikspor	Antalya
19:00	Fredy 40'; Jahović 77' (pen.)			Stadium: Antalya

25 November 2020	Çaykur Rizespor	6–0	Uşak Spor	Rize
21:00	Torun 12'; Rüzgar 43'; Torun 45'; Michalak 54'; Rüzgar 85' (pen.); Rüzgar 90'			Stadium: Çaykur Didi

26 November 2020	BB Erzurumspor	3–2 (a.e.t.)	Ankara Demirspor	Erzurum
13:00	Hamroun 22' (pen.); Teikeu 89'; Hamroun 105' (pen.)		Güneş 44'; Eylik 80'	Stadium: Erzurum Kazım Karabekir

26 November 2020	Kasımpaşa	3–0	24 Erzincanspor	Istanbul
15:00	Tirpan 56'; Alan 61'; Kalkan 90'			Stadium: Recep Tayyip Erdoğan

26 November 2020	Kayserispor	3–3 (a.e.t.) (3–4 p)	Hekimoğlu Trabzon	Kayseri
17:00	Kvrzic 12'; Kvrzic 83'; Kanga 85'		Karadeniz 10'; Karadeniz 25'; Karadeniz 34' (pen.)	Stadium: Kayseri Büyükşehir Belediyesi Kadir Has
	Penalties
	Acar (penalty scored); Kvrzic (penalty scored); Kolovetsios (penalty scored); Kanga (penalty missed); Lopes (penalty missed)		(penalty scored) Eşer; (penalty scored) Erdem; (penalty scored) Odabaşı; (penalty scored) Kuru

26 November 2020	Konyaspor	7–0	Manisa FK	Konya
19:00	Hurtado 9'; Eduok 15'; Demirok 31' (pen.); Hurtado 42'; Daci 50'; Daci 79'; Hurtado 81'			Stadium: Medaş Konya Büyükşehir

26 November 2020	Göztepe	2–0	Kırklarelispor	İzmir
21:00	Akbunar 83'; Guilherme 90+4' (pen.)			Stadium: Gürsel Aksel

== Bracket ==
Fifth round
Sivasspor	1
Giresunspor	0
Trabzonspor	2 (3)
Adana Demirspor (pen.)	2 (4)
Göztepe	4
Bursaspor (a.e.t.)	5
Antalyaspor	1
Boluspor	0
Yeni Malatyaspor	5
Hekimoğlu Trabzon	0
Galatasaray	1
Darıca Gençlerbirliği	0
BB Erzurumspor	5
Esenler Erokspor	1
Alanyaspor	5
Adanaspor	1
Konyaspor	3
Altınordu	1
Gaziantep	3
Kocaelispor	2
Beşiktaş	3
Tarsus İdman Yurdu	1
Çaykur Rizespor	3
Eskişehirspor	0
Fenerbahçe	1
Karacabey Belediyespor	0
Kasımpaşa	5
Muğlaspor	0
Gençlerbirliği	0
Tuzlaspor	2
İstanbul Başakşehir	7
Turgutluspor	0

Round of 16
Sivasspor (a.e.t.)	2
Adana Demirspor	1
Bursaspor	0
Antalyaspor	3
Yeni Malatyaspor	1 (6)
Galatasaray (pen.)	1 (7)
BB Erzurumspor	0
Alanyaspor	3
Konyaspor	2
Gaziantep	1
Beşiktaş	1
Çaykur Rizespor	0
Fenerbahçe	1
Kasımpaşa	0
Tuzlaspor	1
İstanbul Başakşehir	5

Quarterfinals
Sivasspor	0
Antalyaspor	1
Galatasaray	2
Alanyaspor	3
Konyaspor	1 (2)
Beşiktaş (pen.)	1 (3)
Fenerbahçe	1
İstanbul Başakşehir (a.e.t.)	2

Semifinals
Antalyaspor	2
Alanyaspor	0
Beşiktaş (a.e.t.)	3
İstanbul Başakşehir	2

Final
Antalyaspor	0
Beşiktaş	2

== Fifth round ==
16 Super League, 8 First League, 5 Second League and 3 Third League teams competed in this round. Seeds were applied in the single-leg round. The draw was made on 27 November 2020. The match schedules were announced on 2 December 2020. 13 teams (81%) from Super League and 3 teams (19%) from First League qualified for the next round. 13 seeded (81%) and 3 unseeded (19%) teams qualified for the next round. The biggest upset were Tuzlaspor (ranked 39th) eliminating Gençlerbirliği (ranked 12th). The lowest-ranked team to qualify for the next round was Tuzlaspor (ranked 39th). The highest-ranked team eliminated was Trabzonspor (ranked 1st).

=== Teams ===
Seeded	League	Rank	Unseeded	League	Rank
Trabzonspor	SL	1	Adana Demirspor	1L	22
İstanbul Başakşehir	SL	2	Bursaspor	1L	24
Beşiktaş	SL	3	Giresunspor	1L	29
Sivasspor	SL	4	Altınordu	1L	32
Alanyaspor	SL	5	Boluspor	1L	33
Galatasaray	SL	6	Adanaspor	1L	35
Fenerbahçe	SL	7	Eskişehirspor	1L	36
Gaziantep FK	SL	8	Tuzlaspor	1L	39
Antalyaspor	SL	9	Hekimoğlu Trabzon	2L	42
Kasımpaşa	SL	10	Tarsus İdman Yurdu	2L	50
Göztepe	SL	11	Kocaelispor	2L	73
Gençlerbirliği	SL	12	Karacabey Belediyespor	2L	74
Konyaspor	SL	13	Turgutluspor	2L	77
Çaykur Rizespor	SL	15	Esenler Erokspor	3L	83
Yeni Malatyaspor	SL	16	Muğlaspor	3L	87
BB Erzurumspor	SL	20	Darıca Gençlerbirliği	3L	101

=== Results ===
15 December 2020	Kasımpaşa	5–0	Muğlaspor	Istanbul
13:00	Alan 22'; Hodzic 25'; Dülger 39'; Hodzic 53'; Koç 57'	Report		Stadium: Recep Tayyip Erdoğan; Referee: Murat Erdoğan

15 December 2020	Çaykur Rizespor	3–0	Eskişehirspor	Rize
15:00	Rüzgar 5'; Samudio 12'; Torun 15'	Report		Stadium: Çaykur Didi; Referee: Hakan Ceylan

15 December 2020	Yeni Malatyaspor	5–0	Hekimoğlu Trabzon	Malatya
17:00	Topalli 4', 39'; Yavru 47'; Akdeniz 74' (o.g.); Emeksiz 84'	Report		Stadium: Yeni Malatya; Referee: Burak Pakkan

15 December 2020	Göztepe	4–5 (a.e.t.)	Bursaspor	İzmir
18:30	Ideye 32'; Köz 73' (o.g.); Ndiaye 84', 117'	Report	Kör 31', 47', 99', 120+3'; Yılmaz 90+5'	Stadium: Gürsel Aksel; Referee: Emre Malok

15 December 2020	Galatasaray	1–0	Darıca Gençlerbirliği	Istanbul
21:00	Belhanda 44' (pen.)	Report		Stadium: Türk Telekom; Referee: Direnç Tonusluoğlu

16 December 2020	BB Erzurumspor	5–1	Esenler Erokspor	Erzurum
13:00	Başsan 7'; Başsan 20'; Hamroun 29'; Çelik 66'; Şişmanoğlu 76'	Report	Sarıkaya 24'	Stadium: Erzurum Kazım Karabekir; Referee: Kutluhan Bilgiç

16 December 2020	Gaziantep FK	3–2	Kocaelispor	Gaziantep
14:00	Kozulj 39'; Mirallas 65'; Maxim 81'	Report	Köse 15'; Dinçer 88'	Stadium: Kalyon; Referee: Kadir Saglam

16 December 2020	Alanyaspor	5–1	Adanaspor	Antalya
16:00	Pektemek 14'; Aksoy 17'; Pektemek 69'; Güneş 86'; Bareiro 90+1'	Report	Roni 25'	Stadium: Bahçeşehir Okulları; Referee: Abdullah Bugra Taskinsoy

16 December 2020	Trabzonspor	2–2 (a.e.t.) (3–4 p)	Adana Demirspor	Trabzon
18:15	Hugo 55'; Hugo 90+3'	Report	Akgün 47'; Akyüz 79'	Stadium: Şenol Güneş; Referee: Alper Çetin
	Penalties
	Parmak (penalty missed); Hugo (penalty missed); Marlon (penalty scored); Flavio (penalty scored); Baker (penalty scored)		(penalty scored) Kılıç; (penalty scored) Akyüz; (penalty missed) Dibba; (penalty scored) Inler; (penalty scored) Sanuç

16 December 2020	Fenerbahçe	1–0	Karacabey Belediyespor	Istanbul
21:00	Özcan 11' (o.g.)	Report		Stadium: Ülker; Referee: Emre Kargin

17 December 2020	Gençlerbirliği	0–2	Tuzlaspor	Ankara
13:00		Report	Bora 32'; Sarr 43'	Stadium: Eryaman; Referee: Koray Gençerler

17 December 2020	Konyaspor	3–1	Altınordu	Konya
13:00	Karademir 21'; Şahiner 74'; Milosevic 80'	Report	Destan 12'	Stadium: Medaş Konya Büyükşehir; Referee: Mustafa Kürsad Filiz

17 December 2020	Antalyaspor	1–0	Boluspor	Antalya
15:00	Bayrakdar 53'	Report		Stadium: Antalya; Referee: Cihan Aydin

17 December 2020	Sivasspor	1–0	Giresunspor	Sivas
17:00	Kayode 90+2'	Report		Stadium: Yeni 4 Eylül; Referee: Sarper Baris Saka

17 December 2020	İstanbul Başakşehir	7–0	Turgutluspor	Istanbul
19:00	Aleksic 5'; Ba 58'; Koyunlu 65'; Chadli 70'; Gulbrandsen 79'; Gulbrandsen 83'; Gulbrandsen 90+3'	Report		Stadium: Başakşehir Fatih Terim; Referee: Turgut Doman

17 December 2020	Beşiktaş	3–1	Tarsus İdman Yurdu	Istanbul
21:00	Rosier 30'; Larin 39'; Yalçın 56'	Report	Cam 80'	Stadium: Vodafone Park; Referee: Yasin Kol

== Round of 16 ==
13 Super League and 3 First League teams competed in this round. Seeds were applied in the single-leg round. The draw was made on 18 December 2020. The match schedules were announced on 22 December 2020. 8 teams (62%) from Super League qualified for the next round. 7 seeded (88%) and 1 unseeded (13%) teams qualified for the next round. The only upset was Konyaspor (ranked 13th) eliminating Gaziantep FK (ranked 8th). The lowest-ranked team to qualify for the next round was Konyaspor (ranked 13th). The highest-ranked team eliminated was Gaziantep FK (ranked 8th).

=== Teams ===
Seeded	League	Rank	Unseeded	League	Rank
İstanbul Başakşehir	SL	2	Kasımpaşa	SL	10
Beşiktaş	SL	3	Konyaspor	SL	13
Sivasspor	SL	4	Çaykur Rizespor	SL	15
Alanyaspor	SL	5	Yeni Malatyaspor	SL	16
Galatasaray	SL	6	BB Erzurumspor	SL	20
Fenerbahçe	SL	7	Adana Demirspor	1L	22
Gaziantep FK	SL	8	Bursaspor	1L	24
Antalyaspor	SL	9	Tuzlaspor	1L	39

=== Results ===
12 January 2021	Bursaspor	0–3	Antalyaspor	Bursa
15:45		Report	Özmert 6' (pen.); Bayrakdar 33'; Jahovic 36'	Stadium: Bursa Büyükşehir Belediye; Referee: Yasin Kol

12 January 2021	Sivasspor	2–1 (a.e.t.)	Adana Demirspor	Sivas
18:45	Öztekin 37'; Yatabare 116'	Report	Akgün 44'	Stadium: Yeni 4 Eylül; Referee: Burak Seker

12 January 2021	Yeni Malatyaspor	1–1 (a.e.t.) (6–7 p)	Galatasaray	Malatya
20:45	Bulut 102'	Report	Luyindama 120'	Stadium: Yeni Malatya; Referee: Özgür Yankaya
	Penalties
	Ildız (penalty scored); Lukoki (penalty scored); Chebake (penalty scored); Eskihellaç (penalty missed); Ndayishimiye (penalty scored); Wallace (penalty scored); Akça (penalty scored); Topalli (penalty missed)		(penalty scored) Antalyalı; (penalty scored) Bayram; (penalty scored) Çağlayan; (penalty scored) Diagne; (penalty missed) Aktürkoğlu; (penalty scored) Marcao; (penalty scored) Etebo; (penalty scored) Kılınç

13 January 2021	Konyaspor	2–1	Gaziantep	Konya
15:45	Anicic 11'; Şahiner 40'	Report	Demir 90+4'	Stadium: Medaş Konya Büyükşehir; Referee: Suat Arslanboğa

13 January 2021	Tuzlaspor	1–5	İstanbul Başakşehir	Istanbul
18:45	Bora 34'	Report	Ba 8'; Konuk 42' (o.g.); Aleksic 73'; Tagir 79'; Kahveci 89' (pen.)	Stadium: Tuzla Belediye; Referee: Turgut Doman

13 January 2021	Beşiktaş	1–0	Çaykur Rizespor	Istanbul
20:45	Larin 85'	Report		Stadium: Vodafone Park; Referee: Sarper Barış Saka

14 January 2021	Alanyaspor	4–1	BB Erzurumspor	Antalya
18:45	Babacar 14'; Caulker 24'; Babacar 57'; Davidson 77'	Report	Karakullukçu 7'	Stadium: Bahçeşehir Okulları; Referee: Ramazan Keles

14 January 2021	Fenerbahçe	1–0	Kasımpaşa	Istanbul
20:45	Samatta 51'	Report		Stadium: Ülker; Referee: Ümit Öztürk

== Quarter-finals ==
8 Super League teams competed in this round. Seeds were applied in the single-leg round. The draw was made on 15 January 2021. The match schedules were announced on 20 January 2021.

=== Teams ===
Seeded	League	Rank	Unseeded	League	Rank
İstanbul Başakşehir	SL	2	Galatasaray	SL	6
Beşiktaş	SL	3	Fenerbahçe	SL	7
Sivasspor	SL	4	Antalyaspor	SL	9
Alanyaspor	SL	5	Konyaspor	SL	13

=== Results ===
9 February 2021	Fenerbahçe	1–2 (a.e.t.)	İstanbul Başakşehir	Istanbul
20:45	Valencia 72'	Report	Fernandes 42'; Gulbrandsen 96'	Stadium: Ülker; Referee: Fırat Aydınus

10 February 2021	Galatasaray	2–3	Alanyaspor	Istanbul
20:45	Mohamed 83'; Fernandes 90+4'	Report	Babacar 30'; Uçan 41'; Babacar 48' (pen.)	Stadium: Türk Telekom; Referee: Abdulkadir Bitigen

11 February 2021	Sivasspor	0–1	Antalyaspor	Sivas
17:45		Report	Fredy 62' (pen.)	Stadium: Yeni 4 Eylül; Referee: Tugay Kaan Numanoglu

11 February 2021	Konyaspor	1–1 (a.e.t.) (2–3 p)	Beşiktaş	Konya
20:45	Bardakçı 18'	Report	Özyakup 13'	Stadium: Medaş Konya Büyükşehir; Referee: Ali Palabıyık
	Penalties
	Kravets (penalty missed); Guilherme (penalty scored); Skubic (penalty missed); Miya (penalty scored); Bardakçı (penalty missed)		(penalty scored) Ghezzal; (penalty missed) Mensah; (penalty scored) Uysal; (penalty scored) Rosier

== Semi-finals ==
The draw was made on 15 January 2021. The match schedules were announced on 2 March 2021.

=== Results ===
16 March 2021	Beşiktaş	3–2 (a.e.t.)	İstanbul Başakşehir	Istanbul
20:45	Aboubakar 17'; Vida 22'; Larin 102'	Report	Türüç 60'; Giuliano 77'	Stadium: Vodafone Park; Referee: Fırat Aydınus

17 March 2021	Antalyaspor	2–0	Alanyaspor	Antalya
20:45	Podolski 18'; Özmert 82'	Report		Stadium: Antalya; Referee: Mustafa Öğretmenoğlu

== Final ==
The final match schedule was announced on 13 April 2021.

18 May 2021
20:45

Antalyaspor	0–2	Beşiktaş
	Report	De Souza 3'; Rosier 30'

Gürsel Aksel Stadium, İzmir
Referee: Ali Palabıyık

== Top scorers ==
Rank	Player	Club	Goals
1	(Turkey) Batuhan Kör	Bursaspor	4
1	(Norway) Fredrik Gulbrandsen	Başakşehir FK	4
1	(Algeria) Jugurtha Hamroun	BB Erzurumspor	4
1	(Turkey) Kemal Rüzgar	Çaykur Rizespor	4
1	(Senegal) Khouma Babacar	Alanyaspor	4
2	(Canada) Cyle Larin	Beşiktaş	3
2	(Turkey) Batuhan Karadeniz	Hekimoğlu Trabzon	3
2	(Turkey) Gökhan Demir	Arnavutköy Belediye	3
2	(Turkey) Hacı Ömer Doğru	Ankaraspor	3
2	(Kosovo) Jetmir Topalli	Yeni Malatyaspor	3
2	(Peru) Paolo Hurtado	Konyaspor	3
2	(Turkey) Tahsin Hacımustafaoğlu	Şile Yıldızspor	3
2	(Turkey) Tunay Torun	Çaykur Rizespor	3
2	(Turkey) Vedat Bora	Tuzlaspor	3

As of 18 May 2021. Source:
