= 2020–21 Fatih Karagümrük S.K. season =

Fatih Karagümrük S.K.
2020–21 season
- Owner: Süleyman Hurma
- Chairman: Süleyman Hurma
- Manager: Şenol Can (until 15 March); Francesco Farioli (from 21 March)
- Stadium: Atatürk Olympic Stadium
- Süper Lig: 8th
- Turkish Cup: Fourth round
- Top goalscorer: League: Alassane Ndao (11); All: Alassane Ndao (11)
Home colours	Away colours	Third colours

The 2020–21 season was Fatih Karagümrük S.K.'s 95th season in existence and the club's first season back in the top flight of Turkish football following promotion from the TFF First League. In addition to the domestic league, Fatih Karagümrük S.K. will participate in this season's edition of the Turkish Cup. The season covers the period from July 2020 to 30 June 2021.

== Players ==
=== Current squad ===
As of 1 February 2021

Note: Flags indicate national team as defined under FIFA eligibility rules; some limited exceptions apply. Players may hold more than one non-FIFA nationality.

No.	Pos.	Nation	Player
2	GK	ITA	Emiliano Viviano
3	DF	TUR	Alparslan Erdem
4	DF	TUR	Koray Altınay
5	DF	CHI	Enzo Roco
6	MF	ARG	Lucas Biglia (captain)
8	MF	TUR	Zeki Yıldırım
9	FW	POL	Artur Sobiech
11	FW	TUR	Mevlüt Erdinç
14	MF	TUR	Efe Tatlı
15	DF	USA	Eric Lichaj
16	FW	ITA	Fabio Borini
18	MF	SEN	Alassane Ndao
19	FW	FRA	Yannis Salibur
20	MF	SEN	Badou Ndiaye (on loan from Stoke City)
21	DF	TUR	Murat Sarıgül
22	DF	TUR	Fatih Kuruçuk
23	MF	TUR	Aksel Aktas

No.	Pos.	Nation	Player
24	MF	GEO	Vato Arveladze
25	GK	TUR	Yavuz Ulaş Genç
26	DF	NOR	Vegar Eggen Hedenstad
29	DF	SLO	Jure Balkovec
37	DF	ARG	Gastón Campi (on loan from Trabzonspor)
71	FW	SWE	Jimmy Durmaz (on loan from Galatasaray)
75	DF	TUR	Furkan Kara
77	FW	NED	Jeremain Lens (on loan from Beşiktaş)
78	MF	TUR	Egemen Pehlivan
80	MF	CHI	Cristóbal Jorquera
87	DF	BIH	Ervin Zukanović
90	FW	SUI	Kemal Ademi (on loan from Fenerbahçe)
91	MF	ITA	Andrea Bertolacci
93	GK	TUR	Aykut Özer
96	MF	TUR	Emre Çolak
99	GK	TUR	Muzaffer Cem Kablan

== Transfers ==
=== In ===
No.	Pos	Player	Transferred from	Fee	Date	Source
15			TBD		1 July 2020	

=== Out ===
No.	Pos	Player	Transferred to	Fee	Date	Source
15			TBD		1 July 2020	

== Pre-season and friendlies ==
Win Draw Loss Fixtures

22 August 2020 Friendly	Fenerbahçe (Turkey)	2–2	(Turkey) Fatih Karagümrük	Düzce, Turkey
17:00 TRT (UTC+3)	Tufan 7' (pen.); Yandaş 47'		Ndao 5', 77'	Stadium: Fenerbahçe Düzce Topuk Yaylası Tesisleri

6 September 2020 Friendly	Fatih Karagümrük (Turkey)	1–2	(Turkey) İstanbul Başakşehir	Istanbul, Turkey
21:00 TRT (UTC+3)	Camara 60'	Report	Ba 81'; Karakuş 90'	Stadium: Başakşehir Futbol Kulübü Altyapı Tesisleri

15 November 2020 Friendly	Fenerbahçe (Turkey)	3–3	(Turkey) Fatih Karagümrük	Istanbul, Turkey
16:00 TRT (UTC+3)	Cissé 24'; Ahmetoğlu 41'; Ademi 45'		Sabo 9'; Kuruçuk (yellow card) 17'; Erdem 80'; Sobiech 82'	Stadium: Lefter Küçükandonyadis Tesisleri

== Competitions ==
=== Overview ===
Competition	First match	Last match	Starting round	Final position	Record							
Competition	First match	Last match	Starting round	Final position	Pld	W	D	L	GF	GA	GD	Win %
Süper Lig	12 September 2020	May 2021	Matchday 1		28	11	8	9	43	37	+6	39.29
Turkish Cup	4 November 2020	24 November 2020	Third round	Fourth round	2	0	1	1	2	5	−3	0.00
Total					30	11	9	10	45	42	+3	36.67

Last updated: 7 March 2021
Source: Soccerway

=== Süper Lig ===
==== League table ====
Pos	Team	Pld	W	D	L	GF	GA	GD	Pts
6	Hatayspor	40	17	10	13	62	53	+9	61
7	Alanyaspor	40	17	9	14	58	45	+13	60
8	Fatih Karagümrük	40	16	12	12	64	52	+12	60
9	Gaziantep	40	15	13	12	59	51	+8	58
10	Göztepe	40	13	12	15	59	59	0	51

Source: Süper Lig, Soccerway
Rules for classification: 1) Points; 2) Head-to-head points; 3) Head-to-head goal difference; 4) Head-to-head goals scored; 5) Goal difference; 6) Goals scored; 7) Play-off.

==== Results summary ====
Overall								Home						Away					
Pld	W	D	L	GF	GA	GD	Pts	W	D	L	GF	GA	GD	W	D	L	GF	GA	GD
28	11	8	9	43	37	+6	41	8	2	4	25	15	+10	3	6	5	18	22	−4

Last updated: 7 March 2021.
Source: Süper Lig

==== Results by round ====
Round	1	2	3	4	5	6	7	8	9	10	11	12	13	14	15	16	17	18	19	20	21	22	23	24	25	26	27	28	29	30	31	32	33	34	35	36	37	38	39	40	41	42
Ground	H	A	H	A	H	A	H	A	H	A	H	A	H	B	A	H	A	H	A	H	A	A	H	A	H	A	H	A	H	A	H	A	H	A	B	H	A	H	A	H	A	H
Result	W	D	W	L	D	L	W	D	D	D	W	L	W	B	D	L	L	W	W	L	W	D	W	W	L	L	W	D	L													
Position	2	4	1	3	4	5	4	6	7	9	6	9	7	7	7	8	9	8	7	8	8	8	8	8	8	8	8	8														

Updated to match(es) played on 3 March 2021. Source: TFF.org
A = Away; H = Home; B = Bye; W = Win; D = Draw; L = Loss

Note: Since the league has been expanded to 21 teams each team will earn a bye twice this season.

==== Matches ====
12 September 2020 1	Fatih Karagümrük	3–0	Yeni Malatyaspor	Istanbul
17:00 TRT (UTC+3)	Zukanović 4'; Erdinç (yellow card) 14'; Sarıgül (yellow card) 33'; Sobiech (yellow card) 38' (goal) 56'; Sabo 74'; Arveladze (yellow card) 77'	Report	Ildiz (yellow card) 34'; Hafez (yellow card) 72'; Büyük (yellow card) 75'	Stadium: Atatürk Olympic Stadium; Attendance: 0 Referee: Abdulkadir Bitigen

20 September 2020 2	Gaziantep	2–2	Fatih Karagümrük	Gaziantep
19:00 TRT (UTC+3)	Kana-Biyik 53'; André Sousa 59'; Jefferson (yellow card) 75'; Demir (yellow card) 83'	Report	Sobiech (yellow card) 17'; Zukanović 26'; Sabo (yellow card) 40'; Erdinç 90+5'	Stadium: New Gaziantep Stadium; Referee: Alper Ulusoy

25 September 2020 3	Fatih Karagümrük	2–0	İstanbul Başakşehir	Istanbul
20:00 TRT (UTC+3)	Biglia (yellow card) 14'; Roco 47'; Sabo 90'; Altınay (yellow card) 90+4'	Report	Frei (yellow card) 29'; Kahveci (yellow card) 68' (yellow-red card) 82'	Stadium: Atatürk Olympic Stadium; Attendance: 0 Referee: Ali Şansalan

3 October 2020 4	Fenerbahçe	2–1	Fatih Karagümrük	Istanbul
19:00 TRT (UTC+3)	Samatta 24', 68'; Lemos (yellow card) 77' (yellow-red card) 84'	Report	Salibur (yellow card) 54'; Sabo 78' (pen.); Durmaz (yellow card) 90'	Stadium: Şükrü Saracoğlu Stadium; Attendance: 0 Referee: Yaşar Kemal Uğurlu

18 October 2020 5	Fatih Karagümrük	1–1	Kasımpaşa	Istanbul
16:00	Sobiech 45+2'; Durmaz (red card) 74'	Report	Kara 47'	Stadium: Atatürk Olympic Stadium; Attendance: 0 Referee: Erkan Özdamar

25 October 2020 6	Alanyaspor	2–0	Fatih Karagümrük	Alanya
16:00	Davidson 8'; Uçan (yellow card) 56'; Babacar 81'	Report	Balkovec (yellow card) 23'	Stadium: Bahçeşehir Okulları Stadium; Attendance: 0 Referee: Mete Kalkavan

30 October 2020 7	Fatih Karagümrük	5–1	BB Erzurumspor	Istanbul
20:00	Ndiaye 11', 45+4'; Balkovec (yellow card) 15'; Biglia 28' (pen.); Ndao 71'; Sabo 90+1'	Report	Mina (yellow card) 21'; Gomes 90'	Stadium: Atatürk Olympic Stadium; Attendance: 0 Referee: Fırat Aydınus; Fourth official: Çağdaş Altay

8 November 2020 8	Ankaragücü	2–2	Fatih Karagümrük	Ankara
13:30	Børven 27' (pen.); Güral 90'	Report	Sobiech 15'; Roco 35'	Stadium: Eryaman Stadium; Attendance: 0 Referee: Suat Arslanboga; Fourth official: Ramazan Keleş

21 November 2020 9	Fatih Karagümrük	1–1	Sivasspor	Istanbul
13:30	Biglia (yellow card) 32'; Ndao (yellow card) 78'; Sabo 86' (yellow card) 90+6'; Lichaj (yellow card) 90+3'	Report	Lichaj 44' (o.g.); Camara (yellow card) 45+2'; Cofie (yellow card) 83'; Samassa (yellow card) 85'	Stadium: Atatürk Olympic Stadium; Attendance: 0 Referee: Hüseyin Göçek

30 November 2020 10	Kayserispor	0–0	Fatih Karagümrük	Kayseri
19:30		Report		Stadium: Kadir Has Stadium; Attendance: 0 Referee: Alper Ulusoy; Fourth official: Kadir Sağlam

6 December 2020 11	Fatih Karagümrük	2–1	Çaykur Rizespor	Istanbul
13:30 TRT (UTC+3)	Ndao 15', 25'	Report	Meriah 20'	Stadium: Atatürk Olympic Stadium; Attendance: 0 Referee: Umit Öztürk

12 December 2020 12	Hatayspor	3–1	Fatih Karagümrük	Antakya
13:30 TRT (UTC+3)	Ilgaz 11'; Boupendza 75', 83'	Report	Durmaz 65'; Ndiaye (yellow card) 84' (yellow-red card) 86'; Sabo (yellow card) 76' (yellow-red card) 90+2'	Stadium: Hatay New Stadium; Attendance: 0 Referee: Tugay Kaan Numanoğlu

18 December 2020 13	Fatih Karagümrük	2–1	Galatasaray	Istanbul
19:00 TRT	Ndao 46'; Sobiech (yellow card) 62'; Alparslan (yellow card) 76'; Ramazan (yellow card) 84'; Koray (yellow card) 90+4'; Mevlüt 90+5'; Viviano (yellow card) 90+5'; Roco (yellow card) 90+9' (yellow-red card) 90+9'	Report	Donk (yellow card) 43'; Diagne 46' (pen.); Arda (yellow card) 69'; Ömer (yellow card) 90+1'; Ali Yavuz (yellow card) 90+7'; Marcão (red card) 90+14'	Stadium: Atatürk Olympic Stadium; Attendance: 0 Referee: Mustafa Öğretmenoğlu; Assistant referees: Serkan Ok, Murat Ergin Gözütok; Fourth official: Çağdaş Altay

14	BYE

26 December 2020 15	Göztepe	1–1	Fatih Karagümrük	Göztepe
16:00	Ndiaye 11'	Report	Biglia 77'	Stadium: Gürsel Aksel Stadium; Attendance: 0 Referee: Sarper Baris Saka; Assistant referees: Serkan Olguncan, Mustafa Savranlar; Fourth official: Abdullah Taşkınsoy

3 January 2021 16	Fatih Karagümrük	1–2	Trabzonspor	Istanbul
16:00	Jure Balkovec (yellow card) 48' (goal) 70'; Vato Arveladze (yellow card) 57'	Report	Majid Hosseini (yellow card) 13'; Abdülkadir Parmak (yellow card) 37'; Anthony Nwakaeme 46'; Marlon (yellow card) 59'; Caleb Ekuban 81'; Lewis Baker (yellow card) 90'	Stadium: Vodafone Park; Attendance: 0 Referee: Ali Palabıyık; Assistant referees: Mehmet Cem Satman, Serkan Çimen; Fourth official: Mert Güzenge

6 January 2021 17	Antalyaspor	3–1	Fatih Karagümrük	Antalya
19:00 TRT (UTC+3)	Özmert 13' (pen.); Şahin (yellow card) 34'; Bayrakdar 39'; Albayrak 71'	Report	10' Balkovec; (yellow card) 16' Altınay; (red card) 84' Roco; (yellow card) 90+2' Çolak	Stadium: Antalya Stadium; Attendance: 0 Referee: Hüseyin Göçek

10 January 2021 18	Fatih Karagümrük	2–1	Konyaspor	Istanbul
13:30	Bertolacci 66'; Ndiaye 81'	Report	Jevtović 84'	Stadium: Atatürk Olympic Stadium; Attendance: 0 Referee: Serkan Tokat

15 January 2021 19	Gençlerbirliği	1–3	Fatih Karagümrük	Ankara
19:00	Da Motta 74' (pen.)	Report	Biglia 22' (pen.); Ndao 36'; Sobiech 88'	Stadium: Eryaman Stadium; Attendance: 0 Referee: Ali Şansalan

21 January 2021 20	Fatih Karagümrük	1–4	Beşiktaş	Istanbul
16:00 TRT (UTC+3)	Altınay (yellow card) 30'; Hedenstad (yellow card) 33'; Borini 78' (pen.)	Report	Aboubakar 44'; Mensah 50', 70'; Larin 66'	Stadium: Atatürk Olympic Stadium; Attendance: 0 Referee: Mete Kalkavan

24 January 2021 21	Denizlispor	1–2	Fatih Karagümrük	Denizli
16:00	Ángelo Sagal (yellow card) 45'; Hugo Rodallega (yellow card) 61'; Mix Diskerud 87'; Radosław Murawski (yellow card) 90'	Report	(yellow card) 17' Gastón Campi; (yellow card) 24' Lucas Castro; (yellow card) 35' (goal) 44' Fabio Borini; 78' Alassane Ndao	Stadium: Atatürk Stadium; Attendance: 0 Referee: Erkan Özdamar; Assistant referees: Ali Saygın Ögel, İbrahim Bozbey; Fourth official: Caner Ak

19 January 2021 22	Yeni Malatyaspor	0–0	Fatih Karagümrük	Malatya
16:00	Kubilay Kanatsızkuş (red card) 44'	Report		Stadium: Türk Telekom Stadium; Attendance: 0 Referee: Yasin Kol; Fourth official: Direnç Tonusluoğlu

3 February 2021 23	Fatih Karagümrük	2–0	Gaziantep	Istanbul
16:00	Ndao 58'; Borini 64'	Report		Stadium: Atatürk Olympic Stadium; Attendance: 0 Referee: Ali Palabıyık; Fourth official: Abdullah Taşkınsoy

6 February 2021 24	İstanbul Başakşehir	0–1	Fatih Karagümrük	Istanbul
16:00 TRT (UTC+3)	Giuliano (penalty missed) 19'; Okechukwu (yellow card) 84'	Report	Campi (yellow card) 35'; Durmaz 52'	Stadium: Başakşehir Fatih Terim Stadium; Attendance: 0 Referee: Halil Umut Meler

13 February 2021 25	Fatih Karagümrük	1–2	Fenerbahçe	Istanbul
19:00	Fabio Borini 67'; Gastón Campi (yellow card) 90'	Report	Mame Thiam 19'; Caner Erkin (yellow card) 42'; Enner Valencia 53'	Stadium: Atatürk Olympic Stadium; Attendance: 0 Referee: Halis Özkahya; Assistant referees: Ali Saygın Ögel, İlker Takpak; Fourth official: Murat Erdoğan

20 February 2021 26	Kasımpaşa	3–2	Fatih Karagümrük	Istanbul
13:30	Thelin 20'; Erdoğan 59', 68'; Bistrović (yellow card) 75'	Report	Roco 14'; Bertolacci (yellow card) 24'; Castro 80'; Altınay (yellow card) 89'	Stadium: Recep Tayyip Erdoğan Stadium; Attendance: 0 Referee: Yaşar Kemal Uğurlu; Fourth official: Burak Taşkınsoy

27 February 2021 27	Fatih Karagümrük	2–0	Alanyaspor	Istanbul
16:00	Nado 50'; Borini 88'	Report		Stadium: Atatürk Olympic Stadium; Attendance: 0 Referee: Volkan Bayarslan; Fourth official: Erdoğan Özkaya

3 March 2021 28	BB Erzurumspor	2–2	Fatih Karagümrük	Erzurum
13:30	Chahechouhe 17' (pen.); Çelik 63'	Report	Sobiech 30'; Castro 53'	Stadium: Kazım Karabekir Stadium; Attendance: 0 Referee: Ali Şansalan; Fourth official: Gürel Uzuner

7 March 2021 29	Fatih Karagümrük	0–1	Ankaragücü	Istanbul
13:30		Report	Potuk 54'	Stadium: Atatürk Olympic Stadium; Attendance: 0 Referee: Halis Özkahya

13 March 2021 30	Sivasspor	v	Fatih Karagümrük	Sivas
13:30				Stadium: Sivas Stadium; Attendance: 0

19 March 2021 31	Fatih Karagümrük	v	Kayserispor	Istanbul
16:00				Stadium: Atatürk Olympic Stadium; Attendance: 0

3 April 2021 32	Çaykur Rizespor	v	Fatih Karagümrük	Rize
15:00				Stadium: Yeni Rize Şehir Stadium; Attendance: 0

6 April 2021 33	Fatih Karagümrük	v	Hatayspor	Istanbul
15:00				Stadium: Atatürk Olympic Stadium; Attendance: 0

10 April 2021 34	Galatasaray	v	Fatih Karagümrük	Istanbul
19:00 TRT		Report		Stadium: Türk Telekom Stadium

35	BYE

42	Fatih Karagümrük	v	Denizlispor	Istanbul
		Report		Stadium: Atatürk Olympic Stadium

=== Turkish Cup ===
4 November 2020 Third round	Fatih Karagümrük	2–2 (a.e.t.) (4–3 p)	Nevşehir Belediyespor	Istanbul
15:30	Pehlivan 31'; Altınay 104'		Taşdemir 30'; Torun 97'	Stadium: Atatürk Olympic Stadium; Attendance: 0
	Penalties
	Erdem (penalty scored); Sobiech (penalty missed); Chahechouhe (penalty scored); Altınay (penalty scored); Ndao (penalty scored)		(penalty scored) Bedir; (penalty scored) Kaya; (penalty missed) Özdemir; (penalty scored) Işık; (penalty missed) Hacıhafızoğlu

24 November 2020 Fourth round	Fatih Karagümrük	0–3	Esenler Erokspor	Istanbul
17:00			Dağlı 14'; Kızılgün 35'; Sarıkaya 75'	Stadium: Atatürk Olympic Stadium; Attendance: 0
