= Aykut Özer =

Turkish footballer

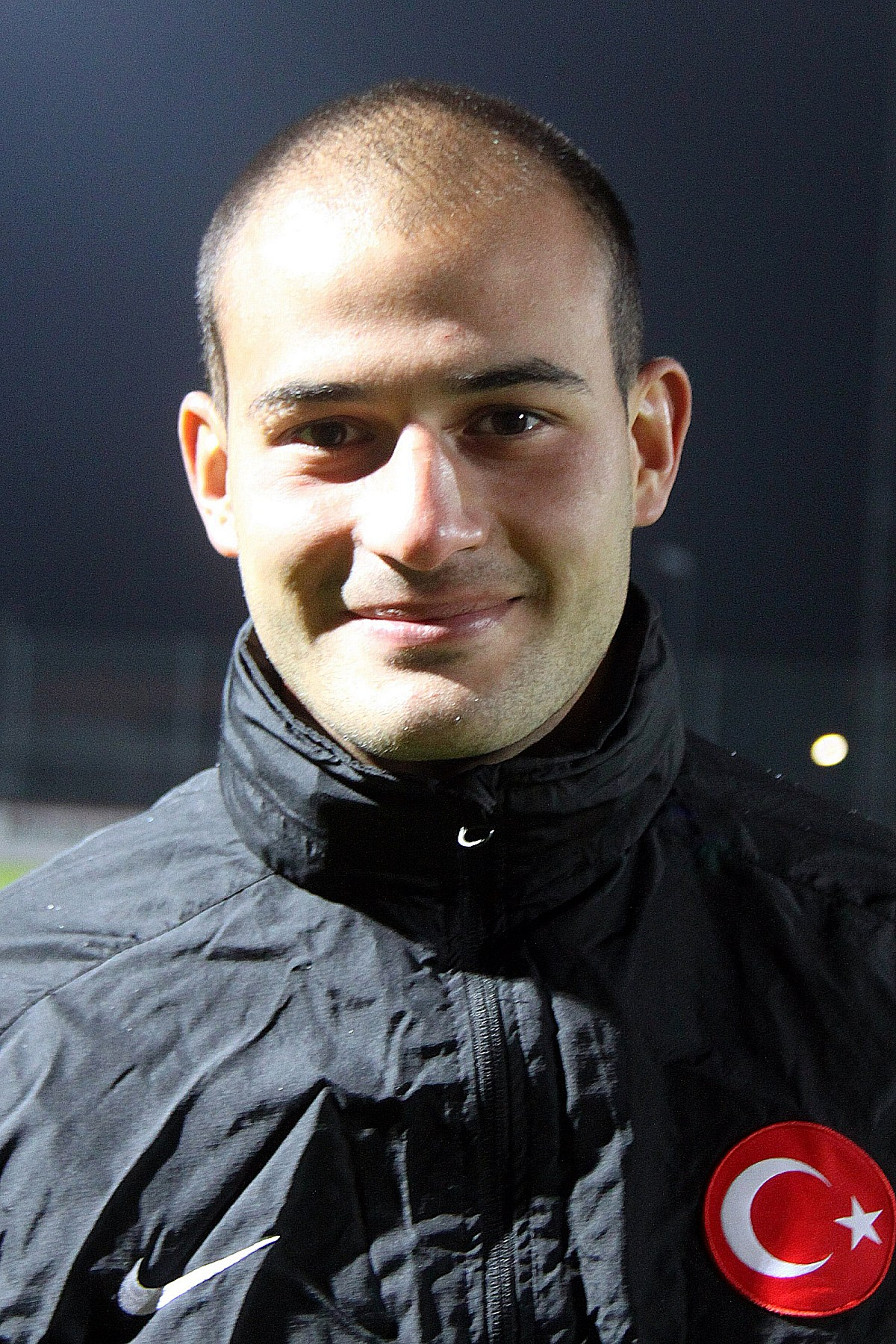
- Özer in 2013

Personal information
- Full name: Aykut Özer
- Date of birth: 1 January 1993 (age 33)
- Place of birth: Hanau, Germany
- Height: 1.88 m (6 ft 2 in)
- Positions: Goalkeeper; midfielder

Team information
- Current team: Hanau

Youth career
- 1999–2002: TSV Hanau
- 2002–2011: Eintracht Frankfurt

Senior career*
Years	Team	Apps	(Gls)
2011–2014	Eintracht Frankfurt II	36	(0)
2011–2014	Eintracht Frankfurt	1	(0)
2014–2017	Karabükspor	1	(0)
2017–2019	Fortuna Sittard	16	(0)
2019–2021	Fatih Karagümrük	36	(0)
2021–2023	Samsunspor	11	(0)
2023–2024	Amedspor	32	(0)
2024–2025	Sarıyer	33	(0)
2025–2026	Ankara Keçiörengücü	6	(0)
2026–	Hanau	1	(0)

International career
2010	Turkey U17	12	(0)
2010–2011	Turkey U18	4	(0)
2011–2012	Turkey U19	3	(0)
2013	Turkey U20	9	(0)
2013–2014	Turkey U21	6	(0)
- * Club domestic league appearances and goals as of 31 October 2026

Aykut Özer (born 1 January 1993) is a footballer who plays for the sixth-tier Verbandsliga Hessen-Süd German club Hanau 93. Born in Germany, he represented Turkey at various youth international levels up to the under-21s. He played as a goalkeeper throughout his career, but is deployed as a midfielder by Hanau.

== Club career ==
Özer started is career with Eintracht Frankfurt. He was part of the squad the qualified to the 2011 UEFA European Under-19 Championship. One of his first games with the first team, was a 10–3 victory against FSG Homberg/Ober-Ofleiden in a friendly match on 14 July 2010.

He joined Karabükspor for the 2014–15, on a pre-contract. He made his debut on a 3–2 defeat against Fenerbahçe.

On 8 August 2017, Özer joined Dutch Eerste Divsie side Fortuna Sittard, signing a one-year contract.

In the summer of 2019, he returned to Turkey, joining Fatih Karagümrük. On 7 May 2021, he renewed his contract with the club.

On 5 July 2021, he joined TFF First League side Samsunspor signing a three-year contract.

On 30 July 2023, Özer joined TFF Second League club Amedspor.

In late October 2026, Özer moved to Hanau 93 in his hometown that plays in the sixth-tier Verbandsliga Hessen-Süd, as a player coach. Instead of his usual goalkeeper position, he was deployed in the outfield for Hanau.

== International career ==
Özer was an unused sub throughout the 2011 UEFA European Under-19 Championship. He played for Turkey at the 2013 FIFA U-20 World Cup.

== Career statistics ==
=== Club ===
As of 4 July 2024

Appearances and goals by club, season and competition
Club	Season	League			National cup		Total	
Club	Season	Division	Apps	Goals	Apps	Goals	Apps	Goals
Eintracht Frankfurt II	2011–12	Regionalliga	3	0	—		3	0
Eintracht Frankfurt II	2012–13	Regionalliga	10	0	—		10	0
Eintracht Frankfurt II	2013–14	Regionalliga	23	0	—		23	0
Eintracht Frankfurt II	Total		36	0	0	0	36	0
Eintracht Frankfurt	2012–13	Bundesliga	1	0	0	0	1	0
Eintracht Frankfurt	2013–14	Bundesliga	0	0	1	0	1	0
Eintracht Frankfurt	Total		1	0	1	0	2	0
Karabükspor	2014–15	Süper Lig	1	0	0	0	1	0
Fortuna Sittard	2017–18	Eerste Divisie	16	0	2	0	18	0
Fortuna Sittard	2018–19	Eredivisie	0	0	3	0	3	0
Fortuna Sittard	Total		16	0	5	0	21	0
Fatih Karagümrük	2019–20	TFF First League	27	0	3	0	30	0
Fatih Karagümrük	2020–21	Süper Lig	9	0	1	0	10	0
Fatih Karagümrük	Total		36	0	4	0	40	0
Samsunspor	2021–22	TFF First League	10	0	1	0	11	0
Samsunspor	2022–23	TFF First League	1	0	3	0	4	0
Samsunspor	Total		11	0	4	0	15	0
Amed	2023–24	TFF Second League	32	0	0	0	32	0
Career total			133	0	14	0	147	0
