= Oğuzhan Azğar =

Turkish footballer (born 1993)

Personal information
- Full name: Oğuzhan Azğar
- Date of birth: 14 July 1993 (age 33)
- Place of birth: Samsun, Turkey
- Height: 1.88 m (6 ft 2 in)
- Position: Centre-back

Team information
- Current team: Ankara Adliyespor
- Number: 55

Youth career
- 2005–2009: Samsunspor

Senior career*
Years	Team	Apps	(Gls)
2009–2013	Samsunspor	4	(0)
2013–2014	Akhisar Belediyespor	0	(0)
2013–2014	→ Derincespor (loan)	18	(2)
2014–2015	Pazarspor	2	(0)
2015	Etimesgut Belediyespor	12	(0)
2016	Diyarbakırspor	5	(0)
2016–	Ankara Adliyespor	15	(1)

International career
2008	Turkey U15	8	(0)
2008–2009	Turkey U16	10	(0)
2009–2010	Turkey U17	24	(2)
2010–2011	Turkey U18	9	(0)
2011–2012	Turkey U19	10	(0)
2012	Turkey U20	1	(0)
- * Club domestic league appearances and goals as of 24 December 2016 (UTC)

Oğuzhan Azğar (born 14 July 1993) is a Turkish footballer who plays as a centre-back for Ankara Adliyespor. He made his Süper Lig debut for Samsunspor against Galatasaray on 7 January 2012.
