= Yusuf Türk =

Turkish professional footballer

Personal information
- Date of birth: 13 February 1998 (age 28)
- Place of birth: İzmir, Turkey
- Height: 1.81 m (5 ft 11 in)
- Position: Winger

Youth career
- 2008–2011: Foça Belediyespor
- 2011–2018: Fenerbahçe

Senior career*
Years	Team	Apps	(Gls)
2018–2023	Gaziantep FK	3	(0)
2019	→ Ofspor (loan)	9	(2)
2019–2020	→ Kastamonuspor 1966 (loan)	20	(3)
2020–2021	→ Karacabey Belediyespor (loan)	19	(6)
2022	→ Bursaspor (loan)	4	(0)
2022–2023	→ Somaspor (loan)	30	(12)
2023–2024	Kastamonuspor 1966	31	(11)
2024–2025	1461 Trabzon	19	(0)

International career
2012–2013	Turkey U15	6	(2)
- * Club domestic league appearances and goals as of 19 October 2025

Yusuf Türk (born 13 February 1998) is a Turkish professional footballer who plays as a winger.

== Career ==
=== Club ===
A youth product of Foça Belediyespor and Fenerbahçe, Türk signed his first professional contract with Gaziantep on 31 August 2018. He began his career with successive loans to Ofspor, Kastamonuspor 1966 and Karacabey Belediyespor. He made his professional debut with Gaziantep in a 3–0 Süper Lig loss to Trabzonspor on 22 February 2021, coming on as a late sub in the 72nd minute.
