= İbrahim Serdar Aydın =

Turkish footballer (born 1996)

Personal information
- Date of birth: 19 July 1996 (age 30)
- Place of birth: Bakırköy, Turkey
- Height: 1.80 m (5 ft 11 in)
- Position: Midfielder

Team information
- Current team: Siirt İl Özel İdaresi SK
- Number: 88

Youth career
- 2007–2013: Fenerbahçe

Senior career*
Years	Team	Apps	(Gls)
2013–2015	Fenerbahçe	2	(0)
2014–2015	→ Karabükspor (loan)	1	(0)
2015–2018	Bursaspor	0	(0)
2015–2016	→ Yeşil Bursa (loan)	21	(0)
2016–2017	→ Yeşil Bursa (loan)	25	(4)
2017–2018	→ Anadolu Selçukspor (loan)	28	(3)
2018–2019	Bayrampaşaspor	11	(1)
2019–2020	1922 Konyaspor	34	(2)
2020–2021	HEASK	22	(1)
2021–2022	GAK	19	(1)
2022–2023	Beyoğlu Yeni Çarşı	25	(0)
2023–	Siirt İl Özel İdaresi SK	3	(0)

International career
2010	Turkey U15		
2011–2012	Turkey U16		
2011–2013	Turkey U17		
2013–2014	Turkey U18	12	(1)
2013–2015	Turkey U19	4	(1)
- * Club domestic league appearances and goals as of 1 October 2023

İbrahim Serdar Aydın (born 19 July 1996) is a Turkish professional footballer who plays as a midfielder for TFF Third League club Siirt İl Özel İdaresi SK. He made his Süper Lig debut on 13 April 2014.
