= Uğur Demirok =

Turkish footballer

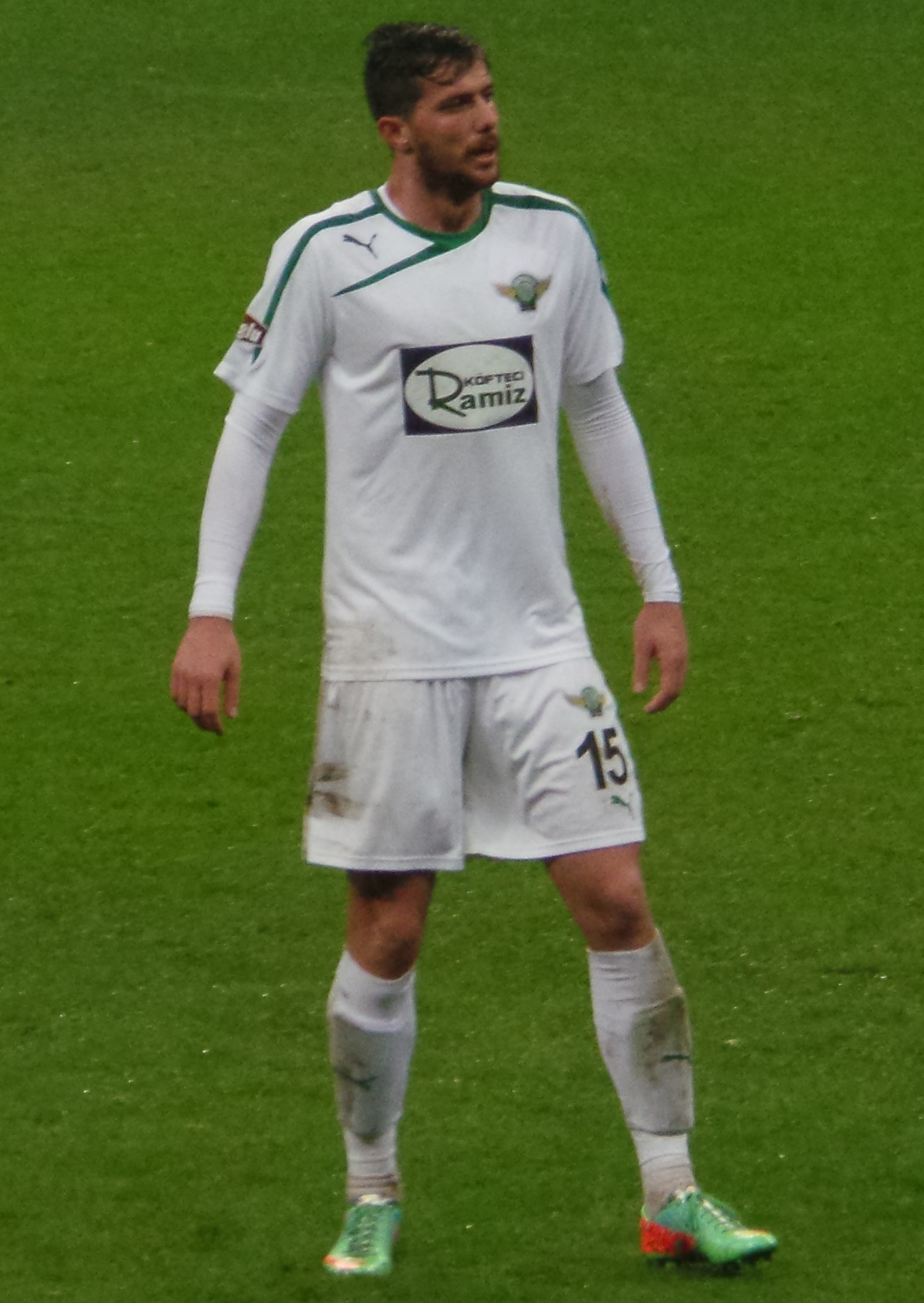
- Demirok with Akhisar Belediyespor in 2014

Personal information
- Date of birth: 8 July 1988 (age 38)
- Place of birth: Istanbul, Turkey
- Height: 1.85 m (6 ft 1 in)
- Position: Defender

Youth career
- 2000–2006: Galatasaray

Senior career*
Years	Team	Apps	(Gls)
2006–2011	Galatasaray	1	(0)
2006–2007	→ Gaziantepspor (loan)	2	(0)
2007–2008	→ İstanbulspor (loan)	22	(0)
2008–2009	→ Beylerbeyi (loan)	17	(2)
2009–2011	→ Kartalspor (loan)	8	(0)
2011–2015	Akhisar Belediyespor	81	(7)
2015–2018	Trabzonspor	62	(6)
2015–2016	→ Osmanlıspor (loan)	26	(1)
2018–2021	Konyaspor	47	(5)
2021–2022	Kayserispor	34	(4)
2022–2024	Eyüpspor	38	(4)
2024	Adanaspor	2	(0)

International career
2002	Turkey U15	2	(0)
2004	Turkey U17	1	(0)
2006	Turkey U18	3	(0)
2006–2007	Turkey U19	4	(0)
2008	Turkey U20	2	(0)
2014	Turkey	2	(0)
- * Club domestic league appearances and goals

Uğur Demirok (born 8 July 1988) is a Turkish former footballer of Bosniak descent who played as a defender.

Demirok earned his first cap for Turkey in a friendly match against Sweden on 5 March 2014.
