= İlker Sayan =

Turkish footballer

Personal information
- Date of birth: 4 May 1993 (age 33)
- Place of birth: Konak, Turkey
- Height: 1.70 m (5 ft 7 in)
- Position: Right winger

Team information
- Current team: Erbaaspor (on loan from Eskişehirspor)
- Number: 17

Youth career
- 2004–2007: Göztepe
- 2007–2010: Dardanelspor

Senior career*
Years	Team	Apps	(Gls)
2010–2017	Dardanelspor	141	(36)
2014–2015	→ Kayseri Erciyesspor (loan)	0	(0)
2017	Kırıkhanspor	14	(3)
2017–2018	Nazilli Belediyespor	11	(1)
2018–2019	Sivasspor	2	(0)
2019	Kırklarelispor	8	(0)
2019–2020	Kırşehir Belediyespor	11	(2)
2020	→ Amed SK (loan)	8	(0)
2020–2021	Şanlıurfaspor	8	(0)
2021–2022	Bayburt Özel İdarespor	48	(10)
2022–2023	Diyarbekirspor	23	(1)
2023–	Eskişehirspor	12	(3)
2023–	→ Erbaaspor (loan)	4	(1)

International career
2008	Turkey U15	9	(2)
2008–2009	Turkey U16	14	(1)
2009–2010	Turkey U17	18	(2)
2010–2011	Turkey U18	7	(1)
2011–2012	Turkey U19	6	(1)
- * Club domestic league appearances and goals

İlker Sayan (born 4 May 1993) is a Turkish professional footballer who plays as a right winger for TFF Third League club Erbaaspor on loan from Eskişehirspor.

== Professional vocation ==
Sayan spent most of his early footballing career with Dardanelspor in the lower tiers of Turkish football, in front abbreviated spells with Kırıkhanspor and Nazilli Belediyespor. Sayan joined Sivasspor in the Süper Lig in 2018. He made his professional debut with them in a 1-0 Süper Lig win over Alanyaspor on 11 August 2018.
