= Ömer Kandemir =

Turkish footballer (born 1993)

Personal information
- Date of birth: 3 July 1993 (age 33)
- Place of birth: İzmir, Turkey
- Height: 1.73 m (5 ft 8 in)
- Position: Right back

Team information
- Current team: Erbaaspor
- Number: 18

Youth career
- 2004–2008: İzmirspor
- 2008–2012: Fenerbahçe

Senior career*
Years	Team	Apps	(Gls)
2012–2013	Giresunspor	12	(0)
2013–2014	Denizlispor	32	(0)
2014–2016	Antalyaspor	15	(0)
2016	→ Karşıyaka (loan)	13	(1)
2016–2017	Bandırmaspor	26	(3)
2017–2018	Kayserispor	0	(0)
2017–2018	→ Samsunspor (loan)	6	(0)
2018	→ Adana Demirspor (loan)	71	(0)
2018–2019	Altınordu	0	(0)
2018–2019	→ Niğde Anadolu (loan)	4	(0)
2019	→ Tokatspor (loan)	14	(1)
2019	Manisa	0	(0)
2020–2021	Pendikspor	33	(0)
2021–2022	Etimesgut Belediyespor	23	(0)
2022–2023	Isparta 32 Spor	27	(0)
2023–2024	Sebat Gençlikspor	13	(0)
2024–2025	Fatsa Belediyespor	10	(0)
2025	Karaköprü Belediyespor	14	(0)
2025–	Erbaaspor	9	(0)

International career
2008	Turkey U15	10	(0)
2008	Turkey U16	7	(0)
2009–2010	Turkey U17	3	(0)
2011–2012	Turkey U19	12	(0)
2012	Turkey U20	4	(0)
- * Club domestic league appearances and goals as of 30 November 2025

Ömer Kandemir (born 3 July 1993) is a Turkish footballer who plays as a right back for TFF 2. Lig club Erbaaspor.

== Professional career ==
A youth international of Fenerbahçe, Kandemir joined Denizlispor in the TFF Second League. On 1 January 2013, Kandemir joined Denizlispor from Giresunspor. Kandemir made his professional debut for Antalyaspor in a 3-2 Süper Lig win over İstanbul Başakşehir F.K. on 15 August 2015.

On 30 June 2017, Kandemir joined Kayserispor. On 13 September 2017, he joined Samsunspor until June 2018. He ended his loan early, and on 31 January 2018 joined Adana Demirspor.
