= Çağatay Yılmaz =

Turkish footballer

Personal information
- Date of birth: 1 January 2000 (age 26)
- Place of birth: İnegöl, Turkey
- Position: Winger

Team information
- Current team: Karadeniz Ereğli Belediyespor
- Number: 10

Youth career
- 2011–2013: İnegölspor
- 2013–2022: Bursaspor

Senior career*
Years	Team	Apps	(Gls)
2018–2024	Bursaspor	68	(23)
2020	→ Kırşehir Futbol SK (loan)	3	(0)
2021–2022	→ Amed (loan)	8	(1)
2022	→ Niğde Anadolu (loan)	13	(2)
2024–2025	Esenler Erokspor	0	(0)
2024–2025	→ Karşıyaka (loan)	10	(0)
2025	→ Karaköprü Belediyespor (loan)	13	(1)
2025–	Karadeniz Ereğli Belediyespor	10	(0)

International career
2015	Turkey U15	5	(1)
2016	Turkey U16	1	(0)
2017	Turkey U18	2	(1)
2018–2019	Turkey U19	4	(0)
- * Club domestic league appearances and goals as of 9 November 2025

Çağatay Yılmaz (born 1 January 2000) is a Turkish professional footballer who plays as a winger for TFF 3. Lig club Karadeniz Ereğli Belediyespor.

== Professional career ==
A youth product of Bursaspor, Çağatay signed his first professional contract on 26 March 2018. Çağatay made his professional debut for Bursaspor in a 1-0 Süper Lig loss to Gençlerbirliği S.K. on 18 May 2018.

He was suspended indefinitely by the Bursaspor management after being deemed to be one of the main actors in the incidents that occurred on the field during the Bursaspor- Diyarbekirspor match played on December 20, 2023.

== International career ==
Çağatay was a prolific goal-scorer and captain of Bursaspor's youth sides, and earned several callups to various Turkish youth national teams.
