= Berkay Samancı =

Turkish footballer

Personal information
- Date of birth: 11 April 1989 (age 37)
- Place of birth: İzmit, Kocaeli, Turkey
- Height: 1.77 m (5 ft 10 in)
- Position: Defensive midfielder

Team information
- Current team: Fethiyespor
- Number: 37

Youth career
- 2000–2006: Kocaelispor

Senior career*
Years	Team	Apps	(Gls)
2006–2009	Kocaelispor	8	(0)
2009–2014	Bucaspor	70	(0)
2011	→ Adana Demirspor (loan)	5	(0)
2014–2016	Altınordu	60	(2)
2016–2017	Adana Demirspor	29	(0)
2017–2018	Manisaspor	15	(0)
2018–2020	Altınordu	64	(3)
2020–2021	Niğde Anadolu	15	(0)
2021	Menemenspor	8	(0)
2021–2022	Uşakspor	29	(0)
2022–2023	Kastamonuspor 1966	17	(0)
2023–	Fethiyespor	17	(2)

International career
2007	Turkey U18	2	(0)
- * Club domestic league appearances and goals as of 23 September 2023

Berkay Samancı (born 11 April 1989) is a Turkish professional footballer who plays as a defensive midfielder for TFF Second League club Fethiyespor. He was also a youth international, having been capped by the Turkey U-18 side twice in 2007.

== Club career ==
Samancı began his career with local club Kocaelispor in 2000. He was promoted to the senior team in 2006, and made his debut on 12 May 2007 against Hacettepe. After making his debut, Samancı was called up to the Turkey U-18 team for two friendly matches against Israel. He made his debut on 28 May 2007. He was transferred to Bucaspor on 20 August 2009, helping the team to a second-place finish in the TFF First League and automatic promotion to the top-flight. Samancı was loaned to TFF Second League club Adana Demirspor for the second half of the 2010–11 season.
