= Uğur Daşdemir =

Turkish footballer

Personal information
- Full name: Uğur Sait Daşdemir
- Date of birth: 10 November 1990 (age 36)
- Place of birth: Kars, Turkey
- Height: 1.76 m (5 ft 9 in)
- Position: Right back

Youth career
- Kocaelispor

Senior career*
Years	Team	Apps	(Gls)
2008–2011	Kocaelispor	59	(3)
2011–2013	Kocaeli Birlik Spor	27	(3)
2013–2014	Karşıyaka	6	(0)
2014–2016	Darıca Gençlerbirliği	31	(0)
2016–2017	Kocaeli Birlik Spor	30	(0)
2017–2018	Adanaspor	4	(0)
2018–2019	Darıca Gençlerbirliği	16	(0)
2019	Fatih Karagümrük	9	(0)
2019–2020	İnegölspor	15	(0)
2020–2021	24 Erzincanspor	17	(0)
2021–2022	Bayrampaşa	30	(0)
2023	Belediye Derincespor	3	(0)
- * Club domestic league appearances and goals as of 20 May 2023

Uğur Daşdemir (born 10 November 1990) is a Turkish professional football player.
