= İsmail Köse =

Turkish footballer

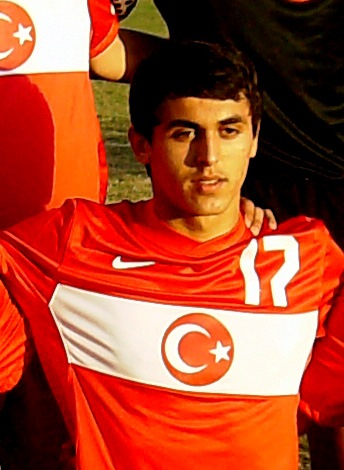

Personal information
- Date of birth: 1 January 1996 (age 30)
- Place of birth: Manisa, Turkey
- Height: 1.81 m (5 ft 11 1/2 in)
- Positions: Attacking midfielder; winger

Team information
- Current team: İçel İdman Yurdu
- Number: 7

Youth career
- 2008–2012: Turgutluspor

Senior career*
Years	Team	Apps	(Gls)
2008–2012	Turgutluspor A2	51	(41)
2012–2014	Turgutluspor	41	(9)
2014–2015	Manisaspor	25	(1)
2015–2019	Göztepe	3	(0)
2016–2017	→ İnegölspor (loan)	15	(2)
2017	→ Gümüşhanespor (loan)	11	(2)
2017–2018	→ Manisa BB (loan)	30	(7)
2018–2019	→ Düzcespor (loan)	28	(9)
2019–2020	1928 Bucaspor	0	(0)
2020–	İçel İdman Yurdu	0	(0)

International career
2010–2011	Turkey U15	4	(0)
2011–2012	Turkey U16	11	(4)
2012–2013	Turkey U17	10	(6)
2013–2014	Turkey U18	2	(0)
2015	Turkey U19	2	(0)
- * Club domestic league appearances and goals as of 21 April 2019

İsmail Köse (Turkish pronunciation: [ismaːil cœse], born 1 January 1996) is a Turkish footballer who plays as a midfielder for İçel İdman Yurdu.

== Career ==
On 17 June 2012, he signed a 3-year contract, becoming a professional football player with his hometown club.

On 23 December 2012, he scored his first professional career goal against Bandırmaspor FC in Spor Toto 2.Lig

On 30 January 2014, he signed a three-and-a-half-year contract with Manisaspor.

On 15 February 2014, he made his debut game in the TFF 1. League against Karşıyaka SK.

== International career ==
Köse won the Most Valuable Player Award in the Muntenia Trophy Tournament in Romania on 11 August 2012.

On 14 October 2012, Kose scored his debut goal against the Kazakhstan national under-17 football team on his debut game in UEFA in the qualifying round way to 2013 UEFA European Under-17 Football Championship.

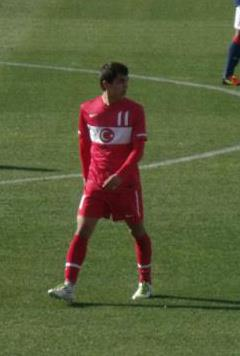
Kose, during the 2012 Aegean Cup Final against France U-16 in Manisa,Turkey

== Personal life ==
His father played football in amateur league. His older brother also plays football in Menemen Belediyespor as midfielder.
