= Vedat Bora =

Turkish professional footballer

Personal information
- Date of birth: 27 January 1995 (age 31)
- Place of birth: Gebze, Turkey
- Height: 1.75 m (5 ft 9 in)
- Position: Midfielder

Team information
- Current team: Isparta 32 SK
- Number: 70

Youth career
- 2010: Gebzespor

Senior career*
Years	Team	Apps	(Gls)
2010–2013	Gebzespor	45	(0)
2013–2020	Konyaspor	33	(0)
2013–2014	→ Konya Şeker (loan)	30	(2)
2016	→ Giresunspor (loan)	5	(0)
2017	→ Samsunspor (loan)	13	(0)
2019–2020	→ Adana Demirspor (loan)	34	(3)
2020–2021	Tuzlaspor	15	(0)
2021–2022	Şanlıurfaspor	27	(1)
2022–2023	Karacabey Belediyespor	16	(1)
2023–2024	Etimesgut Belediyespor	34	(6)
2024–2025	Isparta 32 SK	28	(6)
2025–2026	Şanlıurfaspor	23	(2)
2026–	Isparta 32 SK	3	(0)

International career^{‡}
2012–2013	Turkey U18	8	(0)
2014	Turkey U19	4	(0)
2014	Turkey U20	2	(0)
2015	Turkey U21	3	(0)
- * Club domestic league appearances and goals as of 1 October 2026 ‡ National team caps and goals as of 12 March 2019

Vedat Bora (born 27 January 1995) is a Turkish professional footballer who plays as a midfielder for TFF 2. Lig club Isparta 32 SK.
