= Yusuf Çelik =

Turkish footballer

Personal information
- Full name: Yusuf Çelik
- Date of birth: June 27, 1996 (age 30)
- Place of birth: Manavgat, Turkey
- Height: 1.78 m (5 ft 10 in)
- Position: Centre-back

Team information
- Current team: Serik Belediyespor

Youth career
- 2005–2008: Manavgat Çağlayanspor
- 2008–2009: Manavgat Belediyespor
- 2009–2010: Galatasaray
- 2010–2014: Antalyaspor

Senior career*
Years	Team	Apps	(Gls)
2014–2019	Antalyaspor	3	(0)
2014–2016	→ Manavgatspor (loan)	11	(0)
2018–2019	→ Kırklarelispor (loan)	24	(1)
2019–2020	Kırklarelispor	16	(0)
2020–	Serik Belediyespor	0	(0)
- * Club domestic league appearances and goals ‡ National team caps and goals as of 18 March 2020

Yusuf Çelik (born 27 June 1996) is a Turkish professional footballer who plays as a centre-back for Serik Belediyespor.

== Professional career ==
Yusuf made his professional debut for Antalyaspor in a 2-1 Süper Lig victory over Çaykur Rizespor on 12 March 2017.
