= Samet Bulut =

Dutch footballer

Personal information
- Date of birth: 26 February 1996 (age 30)
- Place of birth: Amsterdam, Netherlands
- Height: 1.88 m (6 ft 2 in)
- Position: Forward

Team information
- Current team: Sebat Gençlikspor

Youth career
- FC New Amsterdam
- 2012–2015: Ajax
- 2015–2016: PEC Zwolle

Senior career*
Years	Team	Apps	(Gls)
2016–2017	PEC Zwolle	1	(0)
2017–2018	Almere City	0	(0)
2017–2018	Jong Almere City	16	(2)
2018–2020	Anadolu Selçukspor	34	(2)
2020	TOP Oss	3	(1)
2020–2021	Sultanbeyli Belediyespor	27	(8)
2021–2024	Alanya 1221 FSK	117	(43)
2024–	Sebat Gençlikspor	42	(26)
- * Club domestic league appearances and goals as of 13 November 2022

Samet Bulut (born 25 February 1996) is a Dutch footballer who plays as a forward for the Turkish side Sebat Gençlikspor whom he joined from TFF Third League club Alanya 1221 FSK Kestelspor.

== Personal life ==
On 12 March 2015, when Bulut played in the youth academy of Ajax, he was arrested along with teammates Zakaria El Azzouzi and Aschraf El Mahdioui for assaulting a plainclothed policewoman. The officer suffered shoulder injuries and various bruises. She later filed charges against the three players. A day later, Ajax announced in an official message that they had suspended the players. Later that week, El Azzouzi remained the only suspect in the case. Bulut was allowed to make appearances for the Ajax A1 youth side again after serving a month suspension. As punishment, he had to inform the youth players of Ajax together with El Azzouzi and El Mahdioui.
