= Ozan Papaker =

Turkish footballer

Personal information
- Date of birth: 10 July 1996 (age 30)
- Place of birth: Rize, Turkey
- Height: 1.88 m (6 ft 2 in)
- Position: Striker

Team information
- Current team: Beykoz Anadolu
- Number: 53

Youth career
- 2007–2008: Rize Belediye
- 2008–2012: Çaykur Rizespor

Senior career*
Years	Team	Apps	(Gls)
2012–2018	Çaykur Rizespor	10	(1)
2013–2014	→ Ofspor (loan)	29	(7)
2014–2017	→ Tuzlaspor (loan)	94	(26)
2018	→ Menemen Belediyespor (loan)	18	(3)
2018–2020	Pendikspor	51	(18)
2020–2021	Adanaspor	9	(0)
2021–2022	24 Erzincanspor	49	(17)
2022–2023	Boluspor	8	(0)
2023	→ Tuzlaspor (loan)	12	(1)
2023–2024	Diyarbekirspor	15	(4)
2024	Muşspor	14	(2)
2024–	Beykoz Anadolu	42	(18)

International career
2012	Turkey U16	4	(1)
2012	Turkey U17	6	(0)
- * Club domestic league appearances and goals as of 30 November 2025

Ozan Papaker (born 10 July 1996) is a Turkish footballer who plays for TFF 2. Lig club Beykoz Anadolu.
