= Noyan Öz =

Turkish-German footballer

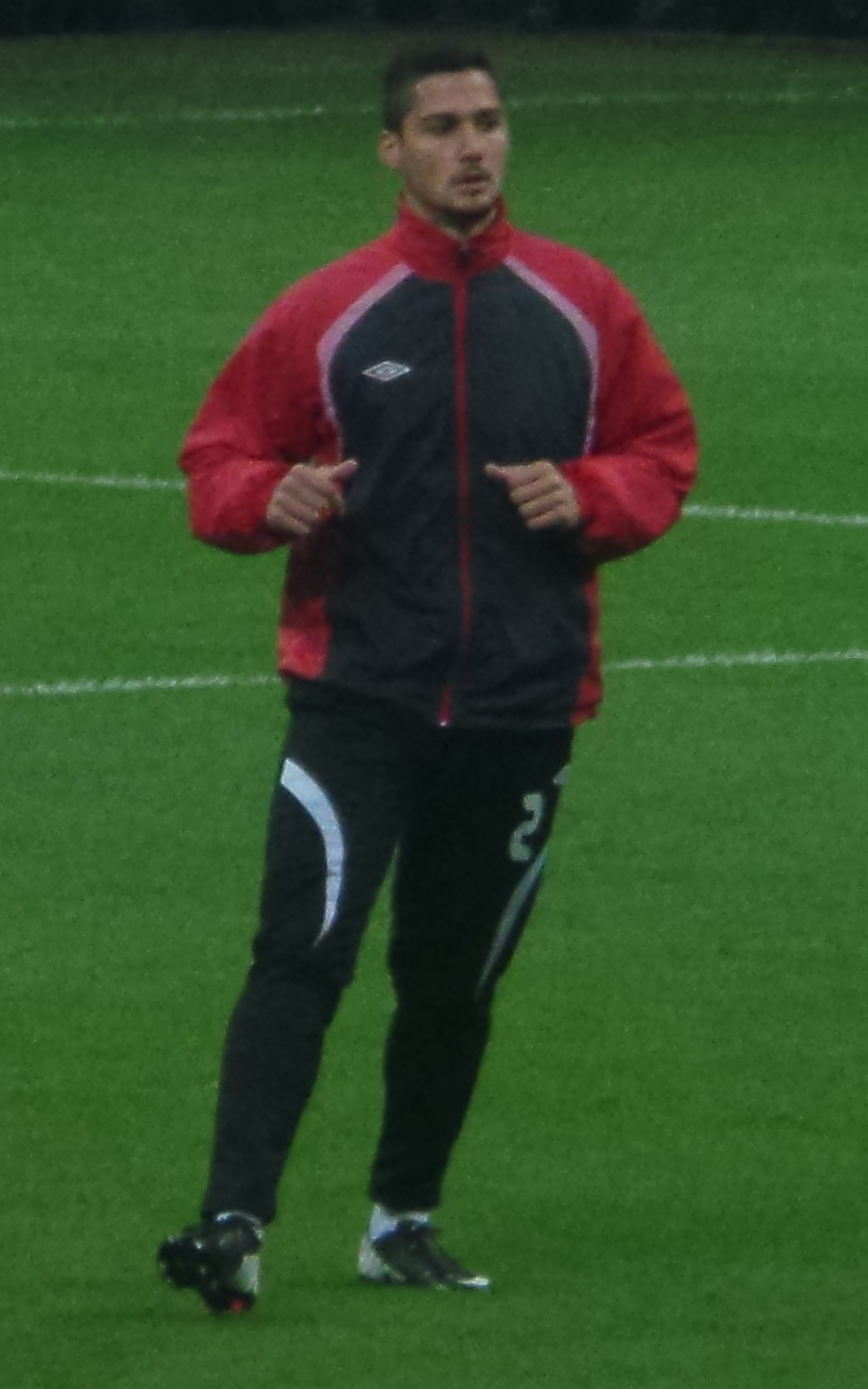

Personal information
- Date of birth: 13 September 1991 (age 35)
- Place of birth: Frankfurt, Germany
- Height: 1.79 m (5 ft 10 in)
- Positions: Forward; winger

Team information
- Current team: Turgutluspor
- Number: 95

Youth career
- TSG Niederrad Frankfurt
- FSV Frankfurt
- –2010: Kickers Offenbach

Senior career*
Years	Team	Apps	(Gls)
2010–2011	Kickers Offenbach II	25	(14)
2011	Kickers Offenbach	1	(0)
2011–2012	FSV Frankfurt II	32	(7)
2012–2013	Eintracht Frankfurt II	22	(10)
2013–2015	Elazığspor	38	(2)
2015–2016	Boluspor	0	(0)
2016–2018	Gençlerbirliği	0	(0)
2016–2017	→ Hacettepe (loan)	30	(7)
2017–2018	→ Hacettepe (loan)	27	(7)
2018–2019	Tokatspor	20	(3)
2019–2022	Uşak Spor	56	(9)
2022–	Turgutluspor	7	(3)
- * Club domestic league appearances and goals as of 6 November 2022

Noyan Öz (born 13 September 1991) is a Turkish-German footballer who plays as a forward for Turkish TFF Third League club Turgutluspor.

== Career ==
Öz began his career with Kickers Offenbach, and scored frequently for the reserve team in the 2010–11 season, earning a first-team debut in the 3. Liga at the end of the season, when he replaced Sead Mehic in a 3–2 defeat to Dynamo Dresden. In July 2011 he left Offenbach to sign for FSV Frankfurt II, and a year later he moved on to Eintracht Frankfurt II. He scored nine goals in the 2012–13 season: unusually, this total consisted of three hattricks, and no other goals. In July 2013 he moved to Turkey to sign for Elazığspor.

=== Club ===
As of 8 March 2014

Club	Season	League		Cup		Other		Europe		Total	
Club	Season	Apps	Goals	Apps	Goals	Apps	Goals	Apps	Goals	Apps	Goals
Elazığspor	2013–14	13	0	8	4	0	0	0	0	21	4
Elazığspor	2014–15	11	1	0	0	0	0	0	0	11	1
Elazığspor	Total	24	1	8	4	0	0	0	0	32	5
Career Totals		24	1	8	4	0	0	0	0	32	5
