= Dimitrios Kolovetsios =

Greek footballer (born 1991)

Dimitris Kolovetsios
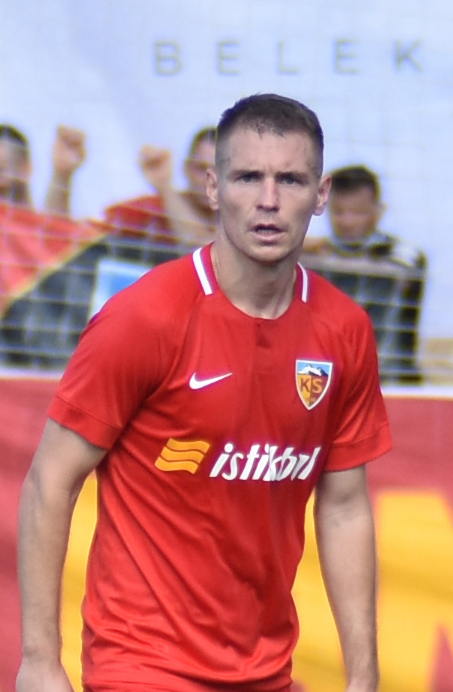
- Kolovetsios with Kayserispor in 2021

Personal information
- Full name: Dimitrios Kolovetsios
- Date of birth: 16 October 1991 (age 35)
- Place of birth: Larissa, Greece
- Height: 1.83 m (6 ft 0 in)
- Position: Centre-back

Youth career
- 2001–2007: Toxotis Larissa
- 2007–2009: Tyrnavos 2005

Senior career*
Years	Team	Apps	(Gls)
2009–2012	AEL	39	(2)
2012–2014	PAS Giannina	61	(2)
2014–2017	AEK Athens	66	(1)
2017–2020	Panathinaikos	74	(3)
2020–2025	Kayserispor	128	(3)
2025–2026	Sakaryaspor	14	(0)
- * Club domestic league appearances and goals as of 7 February 2026

Dimitris Kolovetsios (Greek: Δημήτρης Κολοβέτσιος; born 16 October 1991) is a Greek professional footballer who last played as a centre-back for TFF 1. Lig club Sakaryaspor.

== Club career ==
=== AEL ===
Kolovetsios began playing football with his boyhood football club AEL.

=== PAS Giannina ===
In 2012, Kolovetsios transferred to Super League side PAS Giannina. His impressing performances attracted the interest of many topflight Greek teams such as Olympiacos, PAOK and AEK Athens.

=== AEK Athens ===
In the summer of 2014, Kolovetsios signed with AEK Athens for €250,000. He made his debut on 29 August in a match against Fokikos for the first round of the Greek Cup. He finished the season with a total of 27 appearances and 2 goals.

On 27 June 2017, it was officially announced that the player's contract with AEK was not renewed and the player is now a free agent.

=== Panathinaikos ===
On 3 July 2017, Kolovetsios joined Panathinaikos on a two-year deal. The 26-year-old defender signed a two-year deal after leaving AEK Athens as a free agent, but in the first half of the season his performances have largely been solid but unspectacular. Having started the season as third choice centre back behind Rodrigo Moledo and Georgios Koutroumpis, the Larissa born defender has gradually earned the trust of Marinos Ouzounidis to become a starter at the expense of the latter. In addition to this, he can also provide cover at right back if need be. He has stepped in a few times when Ousmane Coulibaly has been injured.

On 4 January 2019, Kolovetsios agreed to a contract extension until the summer of 2022. Signed by Marinos Ouzounidis in the summer of 2017 on a free transfer from AEK, Kolovetsios has drastically improved under Georgios Donis, earning a call up to the Ethniki squad along the way as a reward for his efforts. On 14 January 2019, Panathinaikos then turned the game on its head by taking a 2–1 lead in the 68th minute through Kolovetsios, who headed past Xanthi goalkeeper Živko Živković from the rebound after Christos Donis' shot had been saved, in a 2–2 home draw against Xanthi. It was his first goal with the club in all competitions. On 10 November 2019, former AEK Athens defender, Kolovetsios was left unmarked and scored a great header from a corner to give Panathinaikos a memorable 3–2 comeback win against rivals AEK Athens. On 1 July 2020, with two minutes left Kolovetsios rose highest to score after a corner delivered by Giannis Bouzoukis, in a 2–0 home win game against Aris.

=== Kayserispor ===
On 15 September 2020, Kayserispor has announced the signing of the Greek defender on a two years contract for an undisclosed fee. The Turkish club had agreed with both Panathinaikos (it will keep a resale rate of 30%) and the player, but they had to wait for a while for the transfers' ban to be lifted permanently, imposed on them last season for breaches of the licensing regulation. On 23 December 2021, Kolovetsios was extremely unlucky in the match between his club and Yeni Malatyaspor, as a forced change was made due to injury and the examinations he underwent showed that he had a ruptured anterior cruciate ligament in his left knee, that will keep him in the sidelines for at least six months. In June 2022, Kolovetsios extended his contract with Kayserispor until 2023. Kolovetsios played his first match of the 2022–23 season against Beşiktaş in the 1st week match of Super League on 6 August 2022 and remained on the field for 90 minutes.

=== Sakaryaspor ===
In July 2025 the Greek footballer moved to Sakaryaspor.

== International career ==
On 19 March 2019, Greece head coach Angelos Anastasiadis announced the call-up of Mavrias for the match against Liechtenstein and Bosnia and Herzegovina for UEFA Euro 2020. Anastasiadis called up Panathinaikos defender to replace Petros Mantalos in the squad for the upcoming qualifiers.

== Career statistics ==
=== Club ===
As of match played 12 April 2026

Appearances and goals by club, season and competition
Club	Season	League			Cup		Europe (Note: Includes UEFA Europa League)		Other (Note: Includes Greek play-offs)		Total	
Club	Season	Division	Apps	Goals	Apps	Goals	Apps	Goals	Apps	Goals	Apps	Goals
AEL	2009–10	Super League Greece	1	0	0	0	—		—		1	0
AEL	2010–11	Super League Greece	12	0	2	0	—		—		14	0
AEL	2011–12	Football League Greece	26	2	0	0	—		—		26	2
AEL	Total		39	2	2	0	—		—		41	2
PAS Giannina	2012–13	Super League Greece	28	0	2	0	0	0	4	0	34	0
PAS Giannina	2013–14	Super League Greece	33	2	1	0	—		—		34	2
PAS Giannina	Total		61	2	3	0	0	0	4	0	68	2
AEK Athens	2014–15	Football League Greece	22	1	5	1	—		—		27	2
AEK Athens	2015–16	Super League Greece	24	0	8	1	0	0	5	0	37	1
AEK Athens	2016–17	Super League Greece	20	0	6	1	2	0	1	0	29	1
AEK Athens	Total		66	1	19	3	2	0	6	0	93	4
Panathinaikos	2017–18	Super League Greece	26	0	2	0	3	0	0	0	31	0
Panathinaikos	2018–19	Super League Greece	28	1	2	0	—		—		30	1
Panathinaikos	2019–20	Super League Greece	20	2	4	0	—		—		24	2
Panathinaikos	Total		74	3	8	0	3	0	0	0	85	3
Kayserispor	2020–21	Süper Lig	35	1	1	0	—		—		36	1
Kayserispor	2021–22	Süper Lig	21	1	1	0	—		—		22	1
Kayserispor	2022–23	Süper Lig	30	0	4	1	—		—		34	1
Kayserispor	2023–24	Süper Lig	23	0	3	0	—		—		26	0
Kayserispor	2024–25	Süper Lig	19	1	1	0	—		—		20	1
Kayserispor	Total		128	3	10	1	0	0	0	0	138	4
Sakaryaspor	2025–26	TFF 1. Lig	14	0	—		—		—		14	0
Career total			382	11	42	4	5	0	10	0	439	15

== Honours ==
AEK Athens

- Football League: 2014–15
- Greek Cup: 2015–16
