= Oğuzhan Çapar =

Turkish footballer (born 1996)

Personal information
- Date of birth: 8 October 1996 (age 30)
- Place of birth: Balıkesir, Turkey
- Height: 1.80 m (5 ft 11 in)
- Position: Defender

Team information
- Current team: Ankaraspor
- Number: 12

Youth career
- 2007–2010: Yeni Sanayispor
- 2010–2016: Balıkesirspor

Senior career*
Years	Team	Apps	(Gls)
2016–2020	Balıkesirspor	58	(1)
2020–2021	Kayserispor	4	(0)
2021	→ Balıkesirspor (loan)	12	(1)
2021–2022	Menemenspor	22	(1)
2022	Ankaraspor	11	(0)
2023	İskenderunspor	3	(1)
2024	Düzcespor	12	(0)
2024–2025	Sakaryaspor	14	(0)
2025–2026	Kırklarelispor	20	(2)
2026–	Ankaraspor	3	(0)

International career^{‡}
2017	Turkey U21	2	(0)
- * Club domestic league appearances and goals as of 1 October 2026 ‡ National team caps and goals as of 26 January 2020

Oğuzhan Çapar (born 8 October 1996) is a Turkish football player who plays as a defender for Ankaraspor in the TFF 2. Lig.

== Professional career ==
Çapar made his professional debut with Kayserispor in a 2–0 Turkish Cup loss to Fenerbahçe on 21 January 2020.
