= Mert Örnek =

Turkish footballer (born 1997)

Personal information
- Date of birth: 12 February 1997 (age 29)
- Place of birth: Aydın, Turkey
- Height: 1.83 m (6 ft 0 in)
- Position: Right winger

Team information
- Current team: Elazığspor
- Number: 23

Youth career
- 2007–2009: Söke Gençlikspor
- 2009–2010: Kuşadası Trabzon Gençlikspor
- 2010–2012: Kuşadasispor
- 2012–2015: Bursaspor

Senior career*
Years	Team	Apps	(Gls)
2015–2017	Bursaspor	11	(0)
2017–2018	Giresunspor	8	(0)
2018–2020	Sancaktepe	72	(10)
2021	Balıkesirspor	16	(0)
2021–2022	Yeni Malatyaspor	0	(0)
2022–2024	Iğdır	35	(18)
2022–2023	→ Ankara Demirspor (loan)	31	(12)
2024–2025	Vanspor	31	(6)
2025–2026	Batman Petrolspor	35	(9)
2025–	Elazığspor	3	(2)

International career^{‡}
2016	Turkey U19	1	(0)
2017	Turkey U21	1	(0)
- * Club domestic league appearances and goals as of 1 October 2026 ‡ National team caps and goals as of 23 December 2020

Mert Örnek (born 12 February 1997) is a Turkish footballer who plays as a right winger for TFF 2. Lig club Elazığspor.

== International career ==
He has represented the Turkish Football Federation at the U19 level, and debuted in a 4-3 loss to the Belgium U19s.
