= Mert Somay =

Turkish footballer

Mert Somay (born 8 January 1986 in Bakırköy) is a Turkish professional footballer who plays as a midfielder for Esemler Erokspor.

He formerly played for Gaziosmanpaşaspor, Bakırköyspor, Kartalspor, and Diyarbakırspor. Somay appeared in nine TFF First League matches for Kartalspor during the 2007-08 season.
