= Enes Karakuş =

Turkish footballer

Personal information
- Date of birth: 3 January 2001 (age 25)
- Place of birth: Etimesgut, Turkey
- Height: 1.93 m (6 ft 4 in)
- Position: Forward

Team information
- Current team: 1461 Trabzon
- Number: 9

Youth career
- 2012–2018: Ankaragücü
- 2018–2020: İstanbul Başakşehir

Senior career*
| Years | Team | Apps | (Gls) |
| 2020–2024 | İstanbul Başakşehir | 2 | (0) |
| 2021 | → Bodrumspor (loan) | 11 | (1) |
| 2021–2022 | → Karacabey Belediyespor (loan) | 11 | (3) |
| 2022–2023 | → Kırklarelispor (loan) | 25 | (2) |
| 2023–2024 | → 1461 Trabzon (loan) | 15 | (4) |
| 2024– | 1461 Trabzon | 44 | (20) |

International career
| 2018 | Turkey U18 | 5 | (0) |
- * Club domestic league appearances and goals as of 29 November 2025

Enes Karakuş (born 3 January 2001) is a Turkish professional footballer who plays as a forward for TFF 2. Lig club 1461 Trabzon.

== Professional career ==
Karakuş made his professional debut with İstanbul Başakşehir in a 2-0 Süper Lig loss to Hatayspor on 14 September 2020.

On 5 January 2023, Karakuş moved on loan to 1461 Trabzon.
