= Egemen Pehlivan =

Turkish footballer

Personal information
- Full name: Muhammed Egemen Pehlivan
- Date of birth: 11 January 2000 (age 26)
- Place of birth: Gaziosmanpaşa, Turkey
- Height: 1.80 m (5 ft 11 in)
- Position: Midfielder

Team information
- Current team: Kastamonuspor 1966
- Number: 21

Youth career
- 2012–2015: İstanbul Gençlerbirliği
- 2015–2016: Kasımpaşa
- 2016–2020: Fatih Karagümrük

Senior career*
Years	Team	Apps	(Gls)
2020–2024	Fatih Karagümrük	13	(1)
2021–2022	→ Bayrampaşaspor (loan)	13	(1)
2022–2023	→ Sapanca Gençlikspor (loan)	31	(6)
2023–2024	→ Diyarbekirspor (loan)	7	(0)
2024	→ Sapanca Gençlikspor (loan)	10	(3)
2024–2025	Kırşehir Futbol SK	28	(4)
2025–	Kastamonuspor 1966	5	(0)
- * Club domestic league appearances and goals as of 30 November 2025

Muhammed Egemen Pehlivan (born 11 January 2000) is a Turkish professional footballer who plays as a midfielder for TFF 2. Lig club Kastamonuspor 1966.

== Career ==
Pehlivan is a youth product of İstanbul Gençlerbirliği, Kasımpaşa and Fatih Karagümrük. He signed his first professional contract with Fatih Karagümrük in the summer of 2020 for 5 years, and in his debut season helped them earn promotion into the Süper Lig. He made his professional and Süper Lig debut with Fatih Karagümrük in a 2–0 loss to Alanyaspor on 25 October 2020. He joined Bayrampaşaspor on loan for the 2021–22 season where he made 13 appearances. The following season 2022–23, he joined Sapanca Gençlikspor on loan in the TFF Third League.
