= Turkey national youth football team =

Turkey
- Association: Turkish Football Federation
- Confederation: UEFA (Europe)
- Head coach: Şenol Ustaömer (U-20); Ahmet Ceyhan (U-19); Mehmet Yıldırım (U-17)
- FIFA code: TUR
First colours	Second colours

The Turkey national youth football team are the national under-20, under-19, under-18, under-17, under-16, under-15 and under-14 football teams of Turkey, which are controlled by the Turkish Football Federation. The youth teams of Turkey participate in tournaments sanctioned by both UEFA and FIFA and also participate in world, regional, and local international tournaments.

== Turkey national under-20 squad ==
- The following players have been called up for a tournament between 15 and 23 of August 2012.

*Some of these players play for their club's reserve team.

No.	Pos.	Player	Date of birth (age)	Caps	Goals	Club
		Muhammed Alperen Uysal				(Turkish Football Federation) Galatasaray
		Berk İsmail Ünsal				(Turkish Football Federation) Galatasaray
		Sadık Çiftpınar				(Turkish Football Federation) Galatasaray
		Hüseyin Tokmak				(Turkish Football Federation) Galatasaray
		Ömer Kandemir				(Turkish Football Federation) Fenerbahçe
		Salih Uçan				(Turkish Football Federation) Fenerbahçe
		Recep Niyaz				(Turkish Football Federation) Fenerbahçe
		Mertcan Aktaş				(Turkish Football Federation) Beşiktaş
		Okan Deniz				(Turkish Football Federation) Bursaspor
		Aytaç Kara				(Turkish Football Federation) Eskişehirspor
		Tufan Kelleci				(Turkish Football Federation) Gaziantepspor
		Abdülkerim Bardakcı				(Turkish Football Federation) Konyaspor
		İsmail Güven				(Turkish Football Federation) Konyaspor
		Sefa Akın Başıbüyük				(Turkish Football Federation) 1461 Trabzon
		Burak Ayaz				(Turkish Football Federation) Bucaspor
		Halil Akbunar				(Turkish Football Federation) Göztepe
		Eray Ataseven				(Turkish Football Federation) Manisaspor
		Oğuzhan Azğar				(Turkish Football Federation) Samsunspor
		Aykut Özer				(German Football Association) Eintracht Frankfurt
		Muhammet Karpuz				(German Football Association) Fortuna Düsseldorf
		Kenan Karaman				(German Football Association) TSG 1899 Hoffenheim

== Turkey national under-19 squad ==
- The following players have been called up to participate in the 2012 UEFA European Under-19 Football Championship elite qualification in May 2012.

*Some of these players play for their club's reserve team.

No.	Pos.	Player	Date of birth (age)	Caps	Goals	Club
	GK	Kemal Mert Özyiğit	8 June 1994 (age 32)			(Turkish Football Federation) Bucaspor
	GK	Alperen Uysal	1 January 1994 (age 32)			(Turkish Football Federation) Galatasaray
	GK	Ozan Özenc	7 January 1993 (age 33)			(Turkish Football Federation) Denizli Belediyespor
	DF	Erhan Kartal	1 March 1993 (age 33)			(Turkish Football Federation) Denizlispor
	DF	Sefa Başıbüyük	18 October 1993 (age 32)			(Turkish Football Federation) Trabzonspor
	DF	Taha Can Velioğlu	21 February 1994 (age 32)			(Turkish Football Federation) Bursaspor
	DF	Oğuzhan Azğar	14 July 1993 (age 32)			(Turkish Football Federation) Samsunspor
	DF	Atınç Nukan	20 July 1993 (age 32)			(Turkish Football Federation) Beşiktaş
	DF	Sadik Ciftpinar	1 January 1993 (age 33)			(Turkish Football Federation) Galatasaray
	DF	Aykut Güler	25 December 1994 (age 31)			(Turkish Football Federation) Gaziosmanpaşa
	DF	Ömer Kandemir	3 July 1993 (age 32)			(Turkish Football Federation) Fenerbahçe
	DF	Abdülkerim Bardakcı	7 September 1994 (age 31)			(Turkish Football Federation) Konyaspor
	DF	Atakan Yigitoglu	4 February 1993 (age 33)			(German Football Association) Hertha BSC
	MF	Eray Ataseven	29 June 1993 (age 32)			(Turkish Football Federation) Manisaspor
	MF	Salih Uçan	6 January 1994 (age 32)			(Turkish Football Federation) Fenerbahçe
	MF	Hakan Çalhanoğlu	8 February 1994 (age 32)			(German Football Association) Karlsruher SC
	MF	Okay Yokuşlu	9 March 1994 (age 32)			(Turkish Football Federation) Kayserispor
	MF	Recep Niyaz	2 August 1995 (age 30)			(Turkish Football Federation) Fenerbahçe
	MF	Emre Pehlivan	19 January 1993 (age 33)			(Turkish Football Federation) Bursaspor
	MF	Enver Cenk Şahin	22 September 1994 (age 31)			(Turkish Football Federation) İstanbul BB
	MF	Sinan Tekerci	22 September 1993 (age 32)			(German Football Association) 1. FC Nürnberg
	MF	İlker Sayan	4 May 1993 (age 33)			(Turkish Football Federation) Dardanel Spor
	FW	Hasan Türk	20 March 1993 (age 33)			(Turkish Football Federation) Beşiktaş
	FW	Berk Ismail Ünsal	6 August 1994 (age 31)			(Turkish Football Federation) Galatasaray
	FW	İbrahim Yılmaz	6 February 1994 (age 32)			(Turkish Football Federation) İstanbul BB
	FW	Okan Derici	16 April 1993 (age 33)			(Turkish Football Federation) Galatasaray
	FW	Kenan Karaman	5 March 1994 (age 32)			(German Football Association) TSG 1899 Hoffenheim
	FW	Okan Deniz	20 May 1994 (age 32)			(Turkish Football Federation) Bursaspor
	FW	Emre Torun	2 June 1993 (age 33)			(Turkish Football Federation) Antalyaspor

== Turkey national under-17 squad ==
- The following players have been called up to participate in the Muntenia Trophy Cup between 6 and 10 of August 2012.

*These players are currently playing in the youth academies of their respective clubs.

No.	Pos.	Player	Date of birth (age)	Caps	Goals	Club
		Bertuğ Başdemir				(Turkish Football Federation) Fenerbahçe
		Anıl Demir				(Turkish Football Federation) Fenerbahçe
		İbrahim Serdar Aydın				(Turkish Football Federation) Fenerbahçe
		Egemen Zengin				(Turkish Football Federation) Fenerbahçe
		Ramazan Civelek				(Turkish Football Federation) Fenerbahçe
		Duhan Çağlar Akdağ				(Turkish Football Federation) Bursaspor
		Oğulcan Çağlayan				(Turkish Football Federation) Bursaspor
		Hüseyin Altuğ Taş				(Turkish Football Federation) Galatasaray
		Berk Yıldız				(Turkish Football Federation) Galatasaray
		Furkan Yaman				(Turkish Football Federation) Beşiktaş
		Zafer Çuvalcı				(Turkish Football Federation) Trabzonspor
		Melih Can Yağcı				(Turkish Football Federation) Bucaspor
		Mahmuthan Samet Acar				(Turkish Football Federation) Bucaspor
		Ozan Papaker				(Turkish Football Federation) Çaykur Rizespor
		Muhammet Arı				(Turkish Football Federation) Denizlispor
		İsmail Köse				(Turkish Football Federation) Turgutluspor
		Mert Öztürk				(German Football Association) VfB Stuttgart
		Orkan Çınar				(German Football Association) VfL Wolfsburg

== Past achievements ==
- Winner of UEFA European Under-17 Football Championship: 1994 & 2005
- 4th Place in FIFA U-17 World Cup: 2005
- Semi-finalist of UEFA European Under-17 Football Championship: 2008 & 2010

== See also ==
- Turkey national football team
- Turkey national under-21 football team
- Turkey national under-20 football team
- Turkey national under-19 football team
- Turkey national under-17 football team
- Turkey national youth football team
