= 2023–24 Denizlispor season =

Denizlispor
2023–24 season
- Chairman: Mehmet Uz
- Manager: Bülent Ertuğrul (until 20 November 2023); Özcan Bizati (from 22 November 2023)
- Stadium: Denizli Atatürk Stadium
- TFF Second League: 18th (relegated)
- Turkish Cup: Second round
- Top goalscorer: League: Bekir Turaç Böke (15); All: Bekir Turaç Böke (15)

The 2023–24 season was the 57th season of Denizlispor in existence and the club's first-ever season in their history in the TFF Second League, the third division of men's professional football in Turkey after being relegated from the Turkish second division TFF First League previous season, finishing in 18th place. In addition to the domestic league, Denizlispor participated in this season's edition of the Turkish Cup. The season covers the period from July 2023 to 30 June 2024.

== Transfers ==
=== In ===
No.	Pos.	Player	Transferred from	Fee	Date	Source
—	DF	(Turkey) Kadir Kurt	(Turkey) Somaspor	Loan return	30 June 2023	
—	MF	(Turkey) Eren Kıryolcu	(Turkey) Darıca Gençlerbirliği	Loan return	30 June 2023	
—	DF	(Turkey) Emre Yıldırım	(Turkey) Gümüşhanespor	Loan return	30 June 2023	
—	GK	(Turkey) Ertuğrul Bağ	(Turkey) Muş 1984 Muşspor	Loan return	30 June 2023	

=== Out ===
No.	Pos.	Player	Transferred to	Fee	Date	Source
—	MF	(Morocco) Ismaïl Aissati	Retired		30 June 2023	
9	FW	(Gabon) Kévin Mayi	(Turkey) Ankara Keçiörengücü	Free	30 June 2023	
77	MF	(Turkey) Mustafa Çeçenoğlu	(Turkey) Bandırmaspor	Free	30 June 2023	
15	DF	(Turkey) Oğuz Yılmaz	(Turkey) GMG Kastamonuspor	Free	30 June 2023	
1	GK	(Turkey) Hüseyin Altıntaş	(Turkey) Balıkesirspor	Free	30 June 2023	
5	DF	(Turkey) Hakan Çinemre	(Turkey) Arnavutköy Belediyespor	Free	30 June 2023	
6	DF	(Turkey) Asım Hamzaçebi	(Turkey) Balıkesirspor	Free	30 June 2023	
10	MF	(Turkey) Okan Derici	(Turkey) Kırklarelispor	Free	30 June 2023	
72	MF	(Turkey) Muhammed Gönülaçar	(Turkey) Bodrumspor	Free	4 July 2023	
22	DF	(France) Léo Schwechlen		Free	30 June 2023	
23	DF	(Turkey) Erdal Akdarı		Free	30 June 2023	
7	FW	(Turkey) Ömer Şişmanoğlu	(Turkey) Iğdır	Free	5 July 2023	
—	DF	(Turkey) Kadir Kurt	(Turkey) Manisa	Free	7 July 2023	
8	DF	(Turkey) Özer Özdemir	(Turkey) Ankara Keçiörengücü	Free	21 August 2023	

=== Contract renewals ===
No.	Pos.	Nat.	Player	Age	Status	Contract length	Contract ends	Source
26	DF	(Turkey)	Gökhan Süzen	36	Extended	One-year	30 June 2024	
27	DF	(Turkey)	Emre Sağlık	25	Extended	One-year	30 June 2024	
7	FW	(Turkey)	Alihan Kalkan	24	Extended	Two-year	30 June 2025	
1	GK	(Turkey)	Ali Eren Yalçın	22	Extended	Two-year	30 June 2025	

== Squad ==
Note: Flags indicate national team as defined under FIFA eligibility rules; some limited exceptions apply. Players may hold more than one non-FIFA nationality.

No.	Pos.	Nation	Player
1	GK	TUR	Ali Eren Yalçın
3	DF	TUR	Emre Yıldırım
4	DF	TUR	Muhammet Özkal
5	DF	TUR	Emirhan Kaşcıoğlu
6	DF	TUR	Mehmet Eren Sıngın
7	FW	TUR	Alihan Kalkan
99	FW	USA	Allen Washington
10	MF	TUR	Omer Gündüz
11	FW	TUR	Mehmet Ali Ulaman
13	MF	TUR	Ertuğrul Yıldırım
14	MF	TUR	Bekir Turaç Böke
16	DF	TUR	Eren Kıryolcu
17	FW	TUR	Deniz Kodal

No.	Pos.	Nation	Player
20	GK	TUR	Abdülkadir Sünger
24	DF	TUR	Oktay Kısaoğlu
25	MF	TUR	Yusuf Emre İnanır
26	DF	TUR	Gökhan Süzen (captain)
27	DF	TUR	Emre Sağlık
31	GK	TUR	Ertuğrul Bağ
37	MF	TUR	Alaattin Öner
42	DF	TUR	Ahmet Tekin
45	DF	TUR	Emre Burgaz
53	DF	TUR	Mustafa Kemal Naza
66	DF	TUR	Berkant Gündem
77	MF	TUR	Emre Furtana

== Pre-season and friendlies ==
=== Pre-season ===
21 July 2023 Friendly	Denizlispor	0–0	Kocaelispor	Afyonkarahisar
18:00 TRT (UTC+3)				Stadium: Zafer Stadium

10 August 2023 Friendly	Uşakspor	1–1	Denizlispor	Uşak
17:00 TRT (UTC+3)				Stadium: Uşak 1 Eylül Stadium

== Competitions ==
=== Overall record ===
Competition	First match	Last match	Starting round	Final position	Record							
Competition	First match	Last match	Starting round	Final position	Pld	W	D	L	GF	GA	GD	Win %
TFF Second League	27 August 2023	4 May 2024	Matchday 1	18th	36	8	8	20	37	57	−20	22.22
Turkish Cup	11 October 2023	11 October 2023	Second round	Second round	1	0	0	1	2	3	−1	0.00
Total					37	8	8	21	39	60	−21	21.62

Source: Soccerway

=== TFF Second League ===
==== League table ====
Pos	Team	Pld	W	D	L	GF	GA	GD	Pts	Qualification or relegation
15	Belediye Derincespor	36	10	10	16	38	43	−5	40 (Note: Ranked on head-to-head points and head-to-head goal difference: Belediye Derincespor 3 (+1), Etimesgut Belediyespor 3 (-1).)	
16	Etimesgut Belediyespor (R)	36	11	7	18	25	38	−13	40	Relegation to the TFF Third League
17	Düzcespor (R)	36	9	10	17	42	63	−21	37	Relegation to the TFF Third League
18	Denizlispor (R)	36	8	8	20	37	57	−20	32	Relegation to the TFF Third League
19	Uşakspor (1984) (R)	36	1	2	33	14	108	−94	5	Relegation to the TFF Third League

Updated to match(es) played on 4 May 2024. Source: TFF
Rules for classification: 1) Points; 2) Head-to-head points; 3) Head-to-head goal difference; 4) Head-to-head goals scored; 5) Goal difference; 6) Goals scored
(R) Relegated

==== Results summary ====
Overall								Home						Away					
Pld	W	D	L	GF	GA	GD	Pts	W	D	L	GF	GA	GD	W	D	L	GF	GA	GD
36	8	8	20	37	57	−20	32	5	6	7	23	23	0	3	2	13	14	34	−20

Source: TFF.org

==== Results by round ====
Round	1	2	3	4	5	6	7	8	9	10	11	12	13	14	15	16	17	18	19	20	21	22	23	24	25	26	27	28	29	30	31	32	33	34	35	36	37	38
Ground	A	H	A	H	A	H	A	H	A	H	A	H		A	H	A	H	A	H	H	A	H	A	H	A	H	A	H	A	H	A		H	A	H	A	H	A
Result	L	D	L	W	W	D	L	W	L	L	L	L	B	L	L	W	D	W	W	D	L	L	D	D	L	L	L	L	W	W	L	B	D	L	D	L	W	L
Position	19	17	17	12	6	9	10	8	9	12	14	14	16	17	18	17	17	16	16	16	16	17	16	17	18	18	18	18	18	18	18	18	18	18	18	18	18	18

Source: TFF.org
A = Away; H = Home; B = Bye; W = Win; D = Draw; L = Loss

==== Matches ====
Win Draw Loss

27 August 2023 1	Amed	2–0	Denizlispor	Diyarbakır
20:00 TRT (UTC+3)	Alsan 76'; Özdıraz 87'	Report	Özkal (yellow card) 45'; Furtana (yellow card) 47'	Stadium: Diyarbakır Stadium; Referee: Can Cengiz

3 September 2023 2	Denizlispor	1–1	Karaman	Denizli
20:00 TRT (UTC+3)	Sağlık (yellow card) 4'; Özkal (yellow card) 6'; Sünger (yellow card) 34'; Kaçan (yellow card) 61'; Süzen 72'	Report	Tursun (yellow card) 51'; Aydın 52'; Turan (yellow card) 78'	Stadium: Denizli Atatürk Stadium; Referee: Burak Taşkınsoy

10 September 2023 3	Isparta 32	2–1	Denizlispor	Isparta
19:00 TRT (UTC+3)	İstemi 51'; Küçükdurmuş 77'; Saki (yellow card) 90+4'; Harlak (yellow card) 90+6'	Report	Kaşcıoğlu (yellow card) 66'; Böke 68', (yellow card) 90+5'; Kısaoğlu (yellow card) 70'	Stadium: Isparta Atatürk Stadium; Referee: Erdem Demirtaş

17 September 2023 4	Denizlispor	3–2	Arnavutköy Belediyespor	Denizli
19:00 TRT (UTC+3)	Böke 53', 56' (pen.), (red card) 90+2'; Özkal (yellow card) 60'; Kaşcıoğlu (yellow card) 68'; Gündem 71'; Tekin (yellow card) 90+2'; Burgaz (yellow card) 90+2'	Report	Cici 5'; Aslan (yellow card) 21' (yellow-red card) 84'; Aydın 41', (yellow card) 46'; Susancak (yellow card) 90'; Türkyılmaz (yellow card) 90+2'; Yaldır (yellow card) 90+6'; Çinemre (yellow card) 90+7'	Stadium: Denizli Atatürk Stadium; Referee: Lütfullah Aslan

23 September 2023 5	Etimesgut Belediyespor	0–2	Denizlispor	Ankara
15:30 TRT (UTC+3)	Yılmaz (yellow card) 85'; Güner (yellow card) 89'; İstemi (yellow card) 90+2'	Report	Kodal 23'; Kısaoğlu 51'; Furtana (yellow card) 74'; Sıngın (yellow card) 90'	Stadium: Etimesgut Atatürk Stadium; Referee: Semih Kurt

1 October 2023 6	Denizlispor	1–1	24 Erzincanspor	Denizli
19:00 TRT (UTC+3)	Burgaz 17'; Kobal (yellow card) 33'; Kalkan (yellow card) 70'; Kısaoğlu (yellow card) 78'	Report	Günaslan 19', (yellow card) 45'; Kaya (yellow card) 70'	Stadium: Denizli Atatürk Stadium; Referee: Taner Tuncer

8 October 2023 7	Fethiyespor	3–1	Denizlispor	Muğla
19:00 TRT (UTC+3)	Arslan (yellow card) 7'; Çakır 60'; Yaşar 64', (yellow card) 70'; Ceylan 68', (yellow card) 75'; Türker (yellow card) 90+6'	Report	Böke 22'; Sağlık (yellow card) 25'; Özkal (yellow card) 70'	Stadium: Fethiye İlçe Stadium; Referee: Serkan Pınar

14 October 2023 8	Denizlispor	2–0	İnegölspor	Denizli
15:30 TRT (UTC+3)	Sağlık (yellow card) 19'; Kaçan 24', (yellow card) 86'; Böke 53'; Kalkan (yellow card) 75'; Kaşcıoğlu (yellow card) 85'	Report	Sevinç (yellow card) 45+1'; Aktaş (yellow card) 74'; Baştan (yellow card) 85'	Stadium: Denizli Atatürk Stadium; Referee: Ömer Faruk Gültekin

18 October 2023 9	Kastamonuspor 1966	2–0	Denizlispor	Kastamonu
15:00 TRT (UTC+3)	Türk 25', (yellow card) 26'; Yavuz 65'	Report	Kıryolcu (yellow card) 20'; Kodal (yellow card) 52'; Kaçan (yellow card) 85'; Özkal (yellow card) 89'	Stadium: Kastamonu Gazi Stadium; Referee: Erhan Kutlu

22 October 2023 10	Denizlispor	0–2	Iğdır	Denizli
15:30 TRT (UTC+3)	Kaşcıoğlu (yellow card) 36'; Kaçan (yellow card) 57'	Report	Yavuz (yellow card) 40'; Şişmanoğlu (yellow card) 85'	Stadium: Denizli Atatürk Stadium; Referee: Onur Bingöl

28 October 2023 11	Somaspor	1–0	Denizlispor	Manisa
14:00 TRT (UTC+3)	Çolak 8'; Fakılı (yellow card) 86'	Report	Sağlık (yellow card) 62'; Kısaoğlu (yellow card) 62'; Çetinkaya (yellow card) 68'; Tekin (yellow card) 80'	Stadium: Soma Atatürk Stadium; Referee: Abdullah Volkan Aydın

5 November 2023 12	Denizlispor	1–2	Menemen	Denizli
14:00 TRT (UTC+3)	Böke 4', (yellow card) 85'	Report	Rüzgar 25'; Yıldırım 90'	Stadium: Denizli Atatürk Stadium; Referee: Tarık Güldal

13	Bye

19 November 2023 14	Sarıyer	2–0	Denizlispor	Istanbul
14:00 TRT (UTC+3)	Doğan (yellow card) 21'; Bekdemir 42'; Bulut 62', (yellow card) 76'; Menize (yellow card) 76'; Müjde (yellow card) 90'; Engül (yellow card) 90+4'	Report	Kaşcıoğlu (yellow card) 73'; Sağlık (yellow card) 76'; Özkal (yellow card) 77'; Kısaoğlu (yellow card) 85'	Stadium: Maltepe Hasan Polat Stadium; Referee: Levent Buğra Vartemel

26 November 2023 15	Denizlispor	1–2	Düzcespor	Denizli
14:00 TRT (UTC+3)	Sağlık (yellow card) 28'; Kaşcıoğlu (yellow card) 57'; Furtana (yellow card) 81'; Böke 90+6'	Report	Sun 22', 54'; Zehir (yellow card) 74'	Stadium: Denizli Atatürk Stadium; Referee: Mustafa Kaan Belder

3 December 2023 16	68 Aksaray Belediyespor	0–1	Denizlispor	Aksaray
14:00 TRT (UTC+3)	Türköz (yellow card) 33'; Özkan (yellow card) 57'	Report	Böke 27', (yellow card) 67'; Gündüz (yellow card) 40'; Kaçan (yellow card) 47'; Yıldırım (yellow card) 58'; Kaşcıoğlu (yellow card) 58'; Sünger (red card) 70'; Sağlık (yellow card) 71'; Sarı (yellow card) 90+8'	Stadium: Dağılgan Stadium; Referee: Yakup Özhan

10 December 2023 17	Denizlispor	1–2	İskenderunspor	Denizli
14:00 TRT (UTC+3)	Süzen 19'; Kaçan (yellow card) 26'; Kaşcıoğlu (yellow card) 45'; Tekin (yellow card) 47'; Gündüz (yellow card) 55'	Report	Temeltaş (yellow card) 43'; Küçükköylü 48'; Kurukalıp (yellow card) 50'; Güneş 71', (yellow card) 81'; Demirci (yellow card) 89'	Stadium: Denizli Atatürk Stadium; Referee: Eren Özyemişcioğlu

19 December 2023 18	Uşakspor	2–2	Denizlispor	Uşak
14:00 TRT (UTC+3)	Özkayımoğlu 16', 45+4', (yellow card) 31'; İnanç (yellow card) 36'; Yiğenoğlu (yellow card) 58'; Gür (yellow card) 74'; Bağcı (yellow card) 85'	Report	Gündüz (red card) 27'; Özkal (yellow card) 31', (goal) 89'; Kıryolcu (yellow card) 54' (yellow-red card) 62'; Böke 65'; Süzen (yellow card) 76'	Stadium: Uşak 1 Eylül Stadium; Referee: Yalçın Taşkınfurat

24 December 2023 19	Denizlispor	2–1	Belediye Derincespor	Denizli
14:00 TRT (UTC+3)	Böke 33', 74'; Öner (yellow card) 81'; Tekin (yellow card) 86'; Özkal (yellow card) 90'	Report	Ayhan (yellow card) 72'; Çelebi 77'	Stadium: Denizli Atatürk Stadium; Referee: Tolga Akbaba

14 January 2024 20	Denizlispor	1–1	Amed	Denizli
14:00 TRT (UTC+3)	Kısaoğlu (yellow card) 20'; Kaşcıoğlu (yellow card) 81'; Yıldırım 86'; Sağlık (yellow card) 87'	Report	Aydin (yellow card) 2'; Aydın (yellow card) 8'; Ünsal 24'; Çetin (yellow card) 85'	Stadium: Denizli Atatürk Stadium; Referee: Bayram Başkan

21 January 2024 21	Karaman	1–0	Denizlispor	Karaman
14:00 TRT (UTC+3)	Tursun 81'	Report	Ulaman (yellow card) 71'; Yıldırım (yellow card) 88'	Stadium: Kemal Kaynaş Stadium; Referee: Fevzi Erdem Akbaş

27 January 2024 22	Denizlispor	1–2	Isparta 32	Denizli
14:00 TRT (UTC+3)	Sağlık 12'; Kaçan (yellow card) 24'; Kısaoğlu (yellow card) 76'	Report	Küçükdurmuş 30', 62'; Diler (yellow card) 37'; Koca (yellow card) 60'; Başkan (yellow card) 71'	Stadium: Denizli Atatürk Stadium; Attendance: 0 Referee: Hakan Ülker

31 January 2024 23	Arnavutköy Belediyespor	2–2	Denizlispor	Istanbul
14:00 TRT (UTC+3)	Dinçer 28', 45+2' (pen.); Keskin (yellow card) 44'; Özmen (yellow card) 90+3'; Bulut (yellow card) 90+5'; Doğan (yellow card) 90+6'	Report	Böke 2', 34', (yellow card) 88'; Kıryolcu (yellow card) 66'; Sağlık (yellow card) 80'; Kaçan (yellow card) 80'	Stadium: Bolluca Stadium; Referee: Erdem Demirtaş

4 February 2024 24	Denizlispor	0–0	Etimesgut Belediyespor	Denizli
14:00 TRT (UTC+3)	Sağlık (yellow card) 55'; Kaşcıoğlu (yellow card) 75'	Report	Akgönül (yellow card) 40'; Salman (yellow card) 77'; Subaşı (yellow card) 81'	Stadium: Denizli Atatürk Stadium; Referee: Berkay Erdemir

11 February 2024 25	24 Erzincanspor	1–0	Denizlispor	Erzincan
14:00 TRT (UTC+3)	Cansev (yellow card) 29'; Yılmaz 39'; İçer (yellow card) 43'; Taşdelen (yellow card) 54'; Yiğiter (yellow card) 63'	Report	Kalkan (yellow card) 26'; Tekin (yellow card) 80'; Böke (yellow card) 90'	Stadium: Erzincan 13 Şubat City Stadium; Referee: Serkan Pınar

18 February 2024 26	Denizlispor	0–1	Fethiyespor	Denizli
14:00 TRT (UTC+3)	Sağlık (yellow card) 45'; Kısaoğlu (yellow card) 48'; Kaşcıoğlu (yellow card) 74'; Süzen (yellow card) 79'	Report	Ceylan 90+8'	Stadium: Denizli Atatürk Stadium; Referee: Burak Taşkınsoy

25 February 2024 27	İnegölspor	4–0	Denizlispor	Bursa
14:00 TRT (UTC+3)	Özyapı 2', 53', 56'; Şahin 53'	Report	Sıngın (yellow card) 38'; Yıldırım (yellow card) 67'; Gündüz (yellow card) 89'; Özkal (yellow card) 90'	Stadium: İnegöl İlçe Stadium; Referee: Semih Kurt

2 March 2024 28	Denizlispor	1–2	Kastamonuspor 1966	Denizli
14:00 TRT (UTC+3)	Böke (yellow card) 65'; Kaşcıoğlu (yellow card) 84'; Kalkan (yellow card) 89'; Sünger (yellow card) 90'; Süzen 90'; Özkal (yellow card) 90+3'	Report	Kılınç (yellow card) 35'; Solmaz 51'; Reşmen (yellow card) 74'; Arslantaş 90+2', (yellow card) 90+2'; Davuş (yellow card) 90+3'	Stadium: Denizli Atatürk Stadium; Attendance: 0 Referee: Enver Aydın

6 March 2024 29	Iğdır	1–3	Denizlispor	Iğdır
14:00 TRT (UTC+3)	Keskin (yellow card) 38'; Kara (yellow card) 47'; Sönmez (yellow card) 72', (goal) 90+2'	Report	Kısaoğlu 37', (yellow card) 72'; Kaçan (yellow card) 38'; Böke 70', 78'	Stadium: Iğdır City Stadium; Referee: Hasan Kaçar

10 March 2024 30	Denizlispor	2–1	Somaspor	Denizli
14:00 TRT (UTC+3)	Karakurt 20', (yellow card) 61'; Öner (yellow card) 20' (yellow-red card) 77'; Süzen (yellow card) 68', (goal) 85'	Report	Aslan (yellow card) 21'; Çoban 46', (yellow card) 55'; Öztürk (yellow card) 68' (yellow-red card) 69'	Stadium: Denizli Atatürk Stadium; Referee: Lütfullah Aslan

17 March 2024 31	Menemen	3–1	Denizlispor	İzmir
14:00 TRT (UTC+3)	Açıkgöz 26'; Yıldırım 40'; Rüzgar 77'; Cengiz (yellow card) 90+5'	Report	Tekin (yellow card) 65'; Gündüz 70'; Kaçan (yellow card) 72'	Stadium: Menemen İlçe Stadium; Referee: Ahmet Ecevit

32	Bye

3 April 2024 33	Denizlispor	0–0	Sarıyer	Denizli
15:00 TRT (UTC+3)	Tekin (yellow card) 24'; Karakurt (yellow card) 55'; Böke (yellow card) 81'; Kısaoğlu (yellow card) 86'	Report	Dursun (yellow card) 22'; Daşdaş (yellow card) 90+3'	Stadium: Denizli Atatürk Stadium; Attendance: 0 Referee: Süleyman Soyutürk

7 April 2024 34	Düzcespor	3–0	Denizlispor	Düzce
15:00 TRT (UTC+3)	Yüksel 2'; Şafakoğlu 11' (pen.); Aydoğan (yellow card) 57'; Durmuş (yellow card) 72'; Siverek (yellow card) 76'; Yılmaz 85', (yellow card) 86'; Palaz (yellow card) 90+4'	Report	Özkal (yellow card) 14'; Kaçan (yellow card) 57'; Gündüz (yellow card) 71'; Tekin (yellow card) 85'	Stadium: 18 Temmuz Stadium; Referee: Yücel Büyük

14 April 2024 35	Denizlispor	2–2	68 Aksaray Belediyespor	Denizli
15:00 TRT (UTC+3)	Sağlık (yellow card) 4', (goal) 6'; Süzen 25' (pen.); Kısaoğlu (yellow card) 28'; Karakurt (yellow card) 58'; Sarı (yellow card) 85'; Sıngın (yellow card) 88'; Kaçan (red card) EG'	Report	Ötkün 4'; Kucık (yellow card) 56'; Tuna (yellow card) 58'; Karnuçu (yellow card) 65'; Özkan (yellow card) 78'; Yazıcı (yellow card) 79'; Abdioğlu 90+2'; Somuncu (red card) 90+3'	Stadium: Denizli Atatürk Stadium; Referee: Adem Cinek

21 April 2024 36	İskenderunspor	3–0	Denizlispor	Hatay
15:00 TRT (UTC+3)	Öztürk 6'; Bilir (yellow card) 52'; Sivri 60'; Kurukalıp (yellow card) 65'; Canlı 90+6'	Report	Kalkan (yellow card) 85'	Stadium: Kırıkhan İlçe Stadium; Referee: Ramazan Doğanay

28 April 2024 37	Denizlispor	4–1	Uşakspor	Denizli
15:00 TRT (UTC+3)	Özkal (yellow card) 10'; Öner 13'; Kaşcıoğlu 39'; Gündüz 45+1'; Süzen 79'	Report	Yavru 25'; İnanç (yellow card) 34'	Stadium: Denizli Atatürk Stadium; Referee: Erdem Temel

4 May 2024 38	Belediye Derincespor	2–1	Denizlispor	Kocaeli
15:00 TRT (UTC+3)	Derin 45'; Genç 90', (yellow card) 90'	Report	Kaçan 31', (yellow card) 57'	Stadium: Belediye Derincespor Stadium; Referee: Eren Özyemişcioğlu

=== Turkish Cup ===
11 October 2023 Second round	Denizlispor	2–3	Burhaniye Belediyespor	Denizli
17:30 TRT (UTC+3)	Sıngın 44'; Yıldırım (yellow card) 7', (goal) 57'	Report	Kaya 18' (pen.), 87'; Oruçoğlu (yellow card) 57'; Kaya 89'	Stadium: Denizli Atatürk Stadium; Referee: Mazlum Doğan Bodur
