= 2024–25 Denizlispor season =

Denizlispor
2024–25 season
- Chairman: Ahmet Yalın Yıldırım (until January 2025); Erhan Ergil (from January 2025 to 3 April 2025); Fatih Aslan Kazancıo (from 9 April 2025)
- Manager: Çağdaş Mavioğlu (until 5 November 2024); Şükrü Akar (caretaker) (from 7 November 2024 to 14 November 2024); Ali Yalçın (from 13 November 2024 to 20 January 2025); Kürşat Taş (from 21 January 2025)
- Stadium: Denizli Atatürk Stadium
- TFF Third League: 15th (relegated)
- Turkish Cup: First round
- Top goalscorer: League: Emre Furtana (5); All: Emre Furtana (5)

The 2024–25 season was the 58th season of Denizlispor in existence and the club's first-ever season in their history in the TFF Third League, the fourth division of men's professional football in Turkey after being relegated from the Turkish third division TFF Second League previous season, finishing in 18th place. In addition to the domestic league, Denizlispor participated in this season's edition of the Turkish Cup. The season covers the period from July 2024 to 30 June 2025.

== Transfers ==
=== In ===
| No. | Pos. | Player | Transferred from | Fee | Date | Source |
|---|---|---|---|---|---|---|
| 35 | DF | (Turkey) Emir Toprak Dinç | Youth team | — | 1 July 2024 | |
| 30 | MF | (Turkey) Nuri Kozhan | Youth team | — | 1 July 2024 | |
| 15 | DF | (Turkey) Rıza Mert Pişirici | Youth team | — | 1 July 2024 | |
| 24 | DF | (Turkey) Melih Kemal Pelen | Youth team | — | 1 July 2024 | |
| 53 | DF | (Turkey) Mustafa Kemal Naza | Youth team | — | 1 July 2024 | |
| 19 | MF | (Turkey) Süleyman Bozbay | Youth team | — | 11 December 2024 | |
| 70 | MF | (Turkey) Talha Eren Ateş | Youth team | — | 11 December 2024 | |
| 88 | MF | (Turkey) Enes Ertuğrul | Youth team | — | 12 December 2024 | |
| 91 | MF | (Turkey) Hüseyin Haktan Uğurlu | Youth team | — | 1 January 2025 | |
| 26 | DF | (Turkey) Gökhan Süzen | Free agent | Free transfer | 24 January 2025 | |

=== Out ===
| No. | Pos. | Player | Transferred to | Fee | Date | Source |
|---|---|---|---|---|---|---|
| 56 | MF | (Turkey) Mustafa Kaçan | (Turkey) Beyoğlu Yeni Çarşı | €171K | 1 July 2024 | |
| 6 | MF | (Turkey) Mehmet Eren Sıngın | (Turkey) Adana 01 FK | Free transfer | 1 July 2024 | |
| 26 | DF | (Turkey) Gökhan Süzen | | Free transfer | 1 July 2024 | |
| 20 | GK | (Turkey) Abdulkadir Sünger | (Turkey) Şanlıurfaspor | Free transfer | 2 July 2024 | |
| 27 | DF | (Turkey) Emre Sağlık | (Turkey) 24 Erzincanspor | Free transfer | 9 July 2024 | |
| 4 | DF | (Turkey) Muhammet Özkal | (Turkey) 24 Erzincanspor | Free transfer | 17 July 2024 | |
| 10 | MF | (Turkey) Samet Emre Gündüz | (Turkey) Ankaraspor | Free transfer | 10 September 2024 | |
| 42 | DF | (Turkey) Ahmet Tekin | (Turkey) Etimesgutspor | Free transfer | 13 September 2024 | |
| 94 | MF | (Turkey) Emre Ak | (Turkey) Kepezspor | Free transfer | 13 September 2024 | |
| 31 | GK | (Turkey) Ertuğrul Bağ | | Free transfer | 11 December 2024 | |
| 7 | DF | (Turkey) Alihan Kalkan | (Turkey) Amasyaspor FK | Free transfer | 9 January 2025 | |
| 5 | DF | (Turkey) Emirhan Kaşcıoğlu | (Turkey) Anadolu Üniversitesi SK | Free transfer | 11 February 2025 | |
| 76 | GK | (Turkey) Şerefhan Sağlık | (Turkey) Erzurumspor F.K. | Free transfer | 11 February 2025 | |

== Squad ==
Note: Flags indicate national team as defined under FIFA eligibility rules; some limited exceptions apply. Players may hold more than one non-FIFA nationality.

| No. | Pos. | Nation | Player |
|---|---|---|---|
| 1 | GK | TUR | Ali Eren Yalçın |
| 3 | DF | TUR | Emre Yıldırım |
| 6 | DF | TUR | Ramazan Karakurt |
| 8 | DF | TUR | Eren Kırıyolcu |
| 9 | FW | TUR | Oğuzhan Sarı |
| 10 | MF | TUR | Deniz Kodal |
| 11 | MF | TUR | Mehmet Ali Ulaman |
| 15 | DF | TUR | Rıza Mert Pişirici |
| 19 | MF | TUR | Süleyman Bozbay |
| 20 | MF | TUR | Oktay Kısaoğlu |
| 22 | DF | TUR | Kemal Çetinkaya |
| 23 | MF | TUR | Alaattin Öner |
| 24 | DF | TUR | Melih Kemal Pelen |

| No. | Pos. | Nation | Player |
|---|---|---|---|
| 26 | DF | TUR | Gökhan Süzen (captain) |
| 27 | DF | TUR | Yusuf Emre İnanır |
| 30 | MF | TUR | Nuri Kozhan |
| 33 | GK | TUR | Emre Çirkin |
| 35 | DF | TUR | Emir Toprak Dinç |
| 53 | DF | TUR | Mustafa Kemal Naza |
| 66 | DF | TUR | Berkant Gündem |
| 70 | MF | TUR | Talha Eren Ateş |
| 77 | MF | TUR | Emre Furtana |
| 88 | MF | TUR | Enes Ertuğrul |
| 91 | MF | TUR | Hüseyin Haktan Uğurlu |
| 99 | FW | TUR | Emre Burgaz |

== Competitions ==
=== Overall record ===
| Competition | First match | Last match | Starting round | Final position | Record | | | | | | | |
| Competition | First match | Last match | Starting round | Final position | Pld | W | D | L | GF | GA | GD | Win % |
|---|---|---|---|---|---|---|---|---|---|---|---|---|
| TFF Third League | 7 September 2024 | 26 April 2025 | Matchday 1 | 15th | 30 | 5 | 12 | 13 | 27 | 55 | −28 | 16.67 |
| Turkish Cup | 11 September 2024 | 11 September 2024 | First round | First round | 1 | 0 | 1 | 0 | 0 | 0 | +0 | 0.00 |
| Total | | | | | 31 | 5 | 13 | 13 | 27 | 55 | −28 | 16.13 |

Source: Soccerway

=== TFF Third League ===
==== League table ====
| Pos | Team | Pld | W | D | L | GF | GA | GD | Pts | Qualification or relegation |
|---|---|---|---|---|---|---|---|---|---|---|
| 12 | Niğde Belediyesispor | 30 | 6 | 9 | 15 | 30 | 53 | −23 | 27 | |
| 13 | Edirnespor | 30 | 5 | 7 | 18 | 28 | 62 | −34 | 22 | |
| 14 | Büyükçekmece Tepecikspor (R) | 30 | 4 | 9 | 17 | 24 | 54 | −30 | 21 (Note: Ranked on head-to-head points: Büyükçekmece Tepecikspor 4, Denizlispor 1) | Relegation to the Turkish Regional Amateur League |
| 15 | Denizlispor (Note: Denizlispor have been deducted 6 points by the FIFA Disciplinary Committee.) (R) | 30 | 5 | 12 | 13 | 27 | 55 | −28 | 21 | Relegation to the Turkish Regional Amateur League |
| 16 | 7 Eylül Turgutlu 1984 (R) | 30 | 4 | 7 | 19 | 34 | 60 | −26 | 19 | Relegation to the Turkish Regional Amateur League |

Source: TFF
Rules for classification: 1) Points; 2) Head-to-head points; 3) Head-to-head goal difference; 4) Head-to-head goals scored; 5) Goal difference; 6) Goals scored
(R) Relegated

==== Results summary ====
| Overall | | | | | | | | Home | | | | | | Away | | | | | |
| Pld | W | D | L | GF | GA | GD | Pts | W | D | L | GF | GA | GD | W | D | L | GF | GA | GD |
|---|---|---|---|---|---|---|---|---|---|---|---|---|---|---|---|---|---|---|---|
| 30 | 5 | 12 | 13 | 27 | 55 | −28 | 21 | 4 | 5 | 6 | 15 | 24 | −9 | 1 | 7 | 7 | 12 | 31 | −19 |

Source: TFF.org

==== Results by round ====
| Round | 1 | 2 | 3 | 4 | 5 | 6 | 7 | 8 | 9 | 10 | 11 | 12 | 13 | 14 | 15 | 16 | 17 | 18 | 19 | 20 | 21 | 22 | 23 | 24 | 25 | 26 | 27 | 28 | 29 | 30 |
|---|---|---|---|---|---|---|---|---|---|---|---|---|---|---|---|---|---|---|---|---|---|---|---|---|---|---|---|---|---|---|
| Ground | H | A | H | A | H | A | H | A | H | A | H | A | A | H | A | A | H | A | H | A | H | A | H | A | H | A | H | H | A | H |
| Result | W | D | D | D | L | L | L | D | L | L | L | W | L | L | L | L | W | L | W | D | D | D | W | D | L | D | D | D | L | L |
| Position | 2 | 6 | 7 | 6 | 7 | 10 | 12 | 13 | 14 | 14 | 14 | 12 | 14 | 14 | 16 | 16 | 16 | 16 | 16 | 16 | 16 | 15 | 13 | 13 | 14 | 15 | 15 | 15 | 15 | 15 |

Source: TFF.org
A = Away; H = Home; W = Win; D = Draw; L = Loss

==== Matches ====
Win Draw Loss

| 7 September 2024 1 | Denizlispor | 3–1 | İzmir Çoruhlu | Denizli |
| 16:30 TRT (UTC+3) | Burgaz (yellow card) 9'; Yusuf İnanır 45+2'; Kalkan (yellow card) 51'; Furtana 77'; Kaşçıoğlu (yellow card) 80'; Ulaman 90'; Bağ (yellow card) 90+4' | Report | Şentürk (yellow card) 42'; Sözen (yellow card) 45+3'; Keleş (yellow card) 50', (goal) 87'; Alpşanlı (yellow card) 75'; Can (yellow card) 90' | Stadium: Denizli Atatürk Stadium; Referee: Muhammed Ömür |

| 14 September 2024 2 | Bursa Nilüfer | 1–1 | Denizlispor | Bursa |
| 16:30 TRT (UTC+3) | Çift 56'; Hanlı (yellow card) 81'; Balçık (yellow card) 90+2' | Report | Dinç (yellow card) 48'; İnanır (yellow card) 60'; Furtana 76' | Stadium: İbrahim Yazıcı Stadium; Referee: Berat Buğra Çelik |

| 22 September 2024 3 | Denizlispor | 1–1 | Polatlı 1926 | Denizli |
| 16:30 TRT (UTC+3) | Kısaoğlu (yellow card) 6'; Kalkan 14' (pen.); Burgaz (yellow card) 19'; Gündem (yellow card) 38'; Furtana (yellow card) 38'; Yıldırım (yellow card) 90+6' | Report | Yılmaz (yellow card) 38'; Kurt (yellow card) 64'; Alan (red card) 65'; Kabasakal 69'; Süer (yellow card) 74' | Stadium: Denizli Atatürk Stadium; Referee: Berkay Ağış |

| 29 September 2024 4 | Erciyes 38 | 2–2 | Denizlispor | Kayseri |
| 15:30 TRT (UTC+3) | Balcı 17'; Bozkuş (yellow card) 22'; Ekici (yellow card) 45+3'; Yazgan 52'; Sizer 90+6'; Çukadar (yellow card) 90+11' | Report | 84' Çetinkaya; 90+10' Kodal | Stadium: Kayseri Atatürk Sports Complex; Referee: Yusuf Aydın |

| 5 October 2024 5 | Denizlispor | 0–2 | Büyükçekmece Tepecikspor | Denizli |
| 16:00 TRT (UTC+3) | Kalkan (yellow card) 50'; İnanır (yellow card) 70'; Sarı (yellow card) 73'; Karakurt (red card) 82' | Report | Emek 19', (yellow card) 73'; Toprak (yellow card) 50'; Vuruşaner (yellow card) 70'; Şimşek (yellow card) 71'; Kara (yellow card) 86'; Ayaydın (yellow card) 90+3'; Erdoğan 90+8', (yellow card) 90+8' | Stadium: Denizli Atatürk Stadium; Referee: Melih Kurt |

| 13 October 2024 6 | Ağrı 1970 | 1–0 | Denizlispor | Ağrı |
| 14:30 TRT (UTC+3) | Kahraman (yellow card) 26'; Yiğit 37'; Cirişoğlu (yellow card) 82'; Yiğit (yellow card) 82' | Report | Kalkan (yellow card) 89' | Stadium: Vali Lütfü Yiğenoğlu Stadium; Referee: Şahin Berker |

| 20 October 2024 7 | Denizlispor | 0–4 | Kahramanmaraş İstiklalspor | Denizli |
| 15:30 TRT (UTC+3) | Pelem (yellow card) 50'; Sarı (yellow card) 88' | Report | İçer 72'; Tuncer 74'; Akarslan 87'; Yumurtacı 90' | Stadium: Denizli Atatürk Stadium; Referee: Egemen Artun |

| 26 October 2024 8 | Kırıkkale | 1–1 | Denizlispor | Kırıkkale |
| 15:00 TRT (UTC+3) | Açıkgöz (yellow card) 45+3'; Öner (yellow card) 64'; Vural 77' (pen.); Tosun (yellow card) 90' | Report | Kodal (yellow card) 54'; Yıldırım (yellow card) 76'; Gündem (yellow card) 85'; Burgaz 89'; Ateş (yellow card) 90+2' | Stadium: Başpınar Stadium; Referee: Veysel Karani Özkan |

| 3 November 2024 9 | Denizlispor | 0–4 | Zonguldakspor | Denizli |
| 14:00 TRT (UTC+3) | Kaşçıoğlu (yellow card) 45+1'; Gündem (yellow card) 51'; İnanır (red card) 88' | Report | Baydemir 33' (pen.), 52', 67'; Uyar (yellow card) 36'; Alyaprak (yellow card) 42'; Kotan (yellow card) 75'; Yazıcı (yellow card) 82'; Akgül 90+5' | Stadium: Denizli Atatürk Stadium; Referee: Muhammed Ömür |

| 10 November 2024 10 | Sebat Gençlikspor | 7–0 | Denizlispor | Trabzon |
| 14:00 TRT (UTC+3) | Balcı 4', 10'; Sönmezsoy 20'; Bulut 33', 39'; Bulut 51'; Dibek 81' | Report | Kaşçıoğlu (yellow card) 39'; Ulaman (yellow card) 79' | Stadium: Yavuz Selim Stadium; Referee: Levent Gümüşdere |

| 17 November 2024 11 | Denizlispor | 0–4 | 7 Eylül Turgutlu 1984 | Denizli |
| 14:00 TRT (UTC+3) | Yıldırım (yellow card) 45+4'; Kodal (yellow card) 55'; Karakurt (yellow card) 56'; Kaşçıoğlu (yellow card) 64'; Sarı (yellow card) 78' | Report | Önal 6', (yellow card) 56'; Köksal 30'; Yeşilyurt (yellow card) 63'; Pınar 77'; Atsız 83'; Şavur (yellow card) 86' | Stadium: Denizli Atatürk Stadium; Referee: Mikail Cihangir |

| 24 November 2024 12 | Edirnespor | 1–2 | Denizlispor | Edirne |
| 14:00 TRT (UTC+3) | Öndaş 3'; Bilir (yellow card) 53'; Özdemir (yellow card) 76'; Ergen (yellow card) 88' | Report | Gündem (yellow card) 18'; Pişirici 23'; Furtana 47'; Yıldırım (yellow card) 88'; Ulaman (yellow card) 90+5'; Yalçın (yellow card) 90+8' | Stadium: Tunca Football Field; Referee: Eren Gökmen |

| 1 December 2024 13 | Mardin 1969 | 5–0 | Denizlispor | Mardin |
| 14:00 TRT (UTC+3) | Ural (yellow card) 10'; Çerioğlu 14'; Kırım (yellow card) 45'; Yiğit 70', 76'; Sağır 72'; İlter 88' | Report | Öner (yellow card) 69' | Stadium: 21 Kasım Stadium; Referee: Ugurcan Gökler |

| 8 December 2024 14 | Denizlispor | 0–1 | Orduspor 1967 | Denizli |
| 14:00 TRT (UTC+3) | Kıryolcu (yellow card) 43'; Kaşçıoğlu (yellow card) 80' | Report | Aynacı (yellow card) 35'; Bayraktar (yellow card) 42'; Tatlısu 45+2'; Tuncer (yellow card) 46'; Polatdemir (yellow card) 90+6' | Stadium: Denizli Atatürk Stadium; Referee: Recep Buğra Çetin |

| 15 December 2024 15 | Niğde Belediyesispor | 2–0 | Denizlispor | Niğde |
| 14:00 TRT (UTC+3) | Karadağ 34'; Çevir 41'; Polat (yellow card) 66'; Topuz (yellow card) 85'; Aydın (yellow card) 90+2' | Report | Gündem (yellow card) 45+3'; Ulaman (yellow card) 79'; Sarı (yellow card) 90+3' | Stadium: Ömer Halisdemir University Field; Referee: Osman Köksaldı |

| 18 January 2025 16 | İzmir Çoruhlu | 2–0 | Denizlispor | İzmir |
| 14:00 TRT (UTC+3) | Gül (yellow card) 11'; Talga 37'; Kavuştu (yellow card) 53'; Arıcıoğlu 79' | Report | Karakurt (yellow card) 27'; Gündem (yellow card) 71'; Pelen (yellow card) 82'; Furtana (yellow card) 90' | Stadium: Bornova Aziz Kocaoğlu Stadium; Referee: Mehmet Alperen Güçyetmez |

| 26 January 2025 17 | Denizlispor | 1–0 | Bursa Nilüfer | Denizli |
| 14:00 TRT (UTC+3) | Öner (yellow card) 21'; Gündem (yellow card) 33'; İnanır (yellow card) 55'; Süzen 66'; Karakurt (yellow card) 78' | Report | Onaran (yellow card) 53'; Tütüncü (yellow card) 55'; Duyan (yellow card) 68'; Güler (yellow card) 85'; Üresin (yellow card) 90+4' | Stadium: Denizli Atatürk Stadium; Referee: İrfan Çağrı Baş |

| 2 February 2025 18 | Polatlı 1926 | 2–0 | Denizlispor | Ankara |
| 14:00 TRT (UTC+3) | Türk 45+3'; Alan 47', (yellow card) 54'; Yılmaz (yellow card) 68'; Süer (yellow card) 90+3' | Report | Süzen (yellow card) 38'; Kodal (yellow card) 58' | Stadium: Polatlı İlçe Stadium; Referee: Abdulsamet Şenoğlu |

| 9 February 2025 19 | Denizlispor | 2–1 | Erciyes 38 | Denizli |
| 14:00 TRT (UTC+3) | İnanır (yellow card) 30'; Pişirici (yellow card) 52'; Furtana 55'; Çetinkaya 79'; Öner (yellow card) 84'; Yıldırım (yellow card) 87'; Çirkin (yellow card) 90+7'; Yalçın (yellow card) 90+11' | Report | Fıstıkcı (yellow card) 33', (goal) 76'; Kanarya (yellow card) 63'; Balcı (yellow card) 85'; Şimşek (yellow card) 87'; Çukadar (yellow card) 90+5'; Erbaşı (yellow card) 90+5' | Stadium: Denizli Atatürk Stadium; Referee: Murat Demir |

| 16 February 2025 20 | Büyükçekmece Tepecikspor | 1–1 | Denizlispor | Istanbul |
| 14:00 TRT (UTC+3) | Eramil (red card) 24'; Avşar 69' | Report | Furtana (yellow card) 30'; Karakurt 76' | Stadium: Tepecik Şenol Güneş Stadium; Referee: Cihan Ölmez |

| 2 April 2025 21 | Denizlispor | 1–1 | Ağrı 1970 | Denizli |
| 14:00 TRT (UTC+3) | Çetinkaya (yellow card) 45+4'; İnanır (yellow card) 56'; Gündem 63', (yellow card) 90+6' | Report | Binici (yellow card) 21'; Şen (yellow card) 56'; Topatar 71' | Stadium: Denizli Atatürk Stadium; Referee: Esad Sadık Demirtaş |

| 2 March 2025 22 | Kahramanmaraş İstiklalspor | 2–2 | Denizlispor | Kahramanmaraş |
| 14:00 TRT (UTC+3) | Tunçer 12'; İmre (yellow card) 61'; Kaya 76' | Report | Öner 29'; Yıldırım (yellow card) 38'; Dinç (yellow card) 52'; Süzen 63' (pen.); Kiryolcu (yellow card) 77'; Yalçın (yellow card) 87' | Referee: Hakan Aktaş |

| 9 March 2025 23 | Denizlispor | 4–1 | Kırıkkale | Denizli |
| 14:00 TRT (UTC+3) | Yıldırım 9', (yellow card) 30'; Süzen (yellow card) 30', (goal) 32'; Karakurt (yellow card) 34'; Çetinkaya 65'; Burgaz 70' | Report | Tosun (yellow card) 30', (goal) 47'; Arslantaş (yellow card) 31'; Turan (yellow card) 51'; Söğüt (yellow card) 85' | Stadium: Denizli Atatürk Stadium; Referee: Talha Öztürk |

| 16 March 2025 24 | Zonguldakspor | 2–2 | Denizlispor | Zonguldak |
| 14:00 TRT (UTC+3) | Ayyıldız 40'; Pişirici 53' (o.g.); Alyaprak (yellow card) 67' | Report | Kıryolcu (yellow card) 9'; Ulaman 39'; Yıldırım (yellow card) 52'; Furtana 69'; Çirkin (yellow card) 86'; Bozbay (yellow card) 90+7' | Stadium: Karaelmas Kemal Köksal Stadium; Referee: Mehmet Terece |

| 2 March 2025 25 | Denizlispor | 1–2 | Sebat Gençlikspor | Denizli |
| 14:00 TRT (UTC+3) | Öner 38', (yellow card) 58'; İnanır (yellow card) 50'; Çetinkaya (yellow card) 76' | Report | Keskin 27'; Bulut (yellow card) 61'; Bulut 80'; Alkurt (yellow card) 86' | Stadium: Denizli Atatürk Stadium; Referee: Birkan Altındaş |

| 26 March 2025 26 | 7 Eylül Turgutlu 1984 | 1–1 | Denizlispor | Manisa |
| 14:00 TRT (UTC+3) | Bilgi 3'; İmir (yellow card) 45'; Şavur (yellow card) 90+4' | Report | Karakurt (yellow card) 41'; Ulaman 44'; İnanır (yellow card) 45'; Yıldırım (yellow card) 60'; Pişirici (yellow card) 75' | Stadium: Turgutlu Stadium; Referee: Emre Can Furuncu |

| 6 April 2025 27 | Denizlispor | 0–0 | Edirnespor | Denizli |
| 15:00 TRT (UTC+3) | Yıldırım (yellow card) 28'; Kısaoğlu (yellow card) 30'; Kıryolcu (yellow card) 68' | Report | Gündüz (yellow card) 38'; Tunçay (yellow card) 82'; Yılmaztürk (yellow card) 90+7' | Stadium: Denizli Atatürk Stadium; Referee: Serkan Pınar |

| 13 April 2025 28 | Denizlispor | 1–1 | Mardin 1969 | Denizli |
| 15:00 TRT (UTC+3) | Kodal 57'; Yıldırım (yellow card) 65'; Öner (yellow card) 87' | Report | Dilek 5', (yellow card) 90+4'; Ünal (yellow card) 45+2' | Stadium: Denizli Atatürk Stadium; Referee: Fevzi Erdem Akbaş |

| 20 April 2025 29 | Orduspor 1967 | 1–0 | Denizlispor | Ordu |
| 15:00 TRT (UTC+3) | Tatlısu (yellow card) 45'; Aydın 62'; Metin (yellow card) 83'; Tuncer (yellow card) 89'; Sevinç (red card) 90+2'; Kurt (yellow card) 90+10' | Report | Yıldırım (yellow card) 45'; Süzen (yellow card) 89'; Karakurt (red card) 90+6' | Stadium: New Ordu Stadium; Referee: Mustafa Ünver |

| 26 April 2025 30 | Denizlispor | 1–1 | Niğde Belediyesispor | Denizli |
| 15:00 TRT (UTC+3) | Burgaz 45+4'; Kodal (yellow card) 59' | Report | Yılmaz (yellow card) 35'; Karakaş 45+2'; Yıldırım (yellow card) 48'; Olgaç (yellow card) 79' | Stadium: Denizli Atatürk Stadium; Referee: Egemen Artun |

=== Turkish Cup ===
| 11 September 2024 First round | Bucak Belediye Oğuzhanspor | 0–0 (a.e.t.) (6–5 p) | Denizlispor | Burdur |
| 14:30 TRT (UTC+3) | Çelik (yellow card) 38'; Odabaşı (yellow card) 45+2'; Kurtuluş (yellow card) 60'; Çolak (yellow card) 110' | Report | Çetinkaya (yellow card) 61'; Er (yellow card) 66'; Pelen (yellow card) 76'; Kozhan (red card) 81'; Uğurlu (yellow card) 95' | Stadium: Bucak İlçe Stadium; Referee: İbrahim Güner |
| | Penalties |
| | Kurtuluş (penalty missed); İncesu (penalty scored); Özoğul (penalty missed); Odabaşı (penalty scored); Koparan (penalty missed); Çolak (penalty scored); Süren (penalty scored); Yurdakul (penalty scored); Cihan (penalty scored) | | (penalty missed) Ateş; (penalty missed) Pelen; (penalty missed) Çetinkaya; (penalty scored) Naza; (penalty scored) Uğurlu; (penalty scored) Yalçın; (penalty scored) Yılmaz; (penalty scored) Yumlu; (penalty missed) Kocalar |
