= 2023–24 Turkish Cup =

Ziraat Turkish Cup

Tournament details
- Country: Turkey
- Dates: 17 September 2023 – 23 May 2024
- Teams: 164

Final positions
- Champions: Beşiktaş (11th title)
- Runners-up: Trabzonspor

The 2023–24 Turkish Cup (Turkish: Türkiye Kupası) was the 62nd season of the tournament. Ziraat Bank was the sponsor of the tournament, thus the sponsored name was the Ziraat Turkish Cup. In the final, Beşiktaş defeated Trabzonspor 3-2, and thus qualified for the 2024–25 Europa League play-off round and the 2024 Turkish Super Cup against Galatasaray.

Fenerbahçe were the defending champions, butwere eliminated in the quarter-finals by MKE Ankaragücü.

== Competition format ==
Round	Draw Date	Match Dates	Total Clubs Remaining	Clubs Involved	Winners from Previous Round	New Entries at This Round	Leagues Entering at This Round	Notes
Preliminary round	12 September 2023	17 September 2023	164	28	0	28	16 amateur teams from 16 cities that do not have a professional team in 2023–24 season; 12 amateur teams ranked 1st in 2022-23 Regional Amateur League groups that did not get promoted to 3rd League	single leg
First round	19 September 2023	26-28 September 2023, 4 October 2023	150	62	14	48	48 teams in 2023–24 3rd League groups except those entering in third round	single leg
Second round	29 September 2023	11-13 October 2023	119	50	31	19	19 teams in 2023–24 2nd League groups except those entering in third and fourth rounds	single leg; seedings applied; seeded teams play at home
Third round	17 October 2023	31 October - 2 November 2023	94	68	25	43	12 teams eliminated from 2022-23 3rd League play-offs; 4 teams ranked 7th and 8th in 2022–23 2nd League groups; 6 teams promoted from 2022-23 3rd League; 11 teams in 2023–24 1st League except those entering in fourth round; 10 teams in 2023-24 Super League except those entering in fourth and fifth rounds	single leg; seedings applied; seeded teams play at home
Fourth round	7 November 2023	5-7 December 2023	60	56	34	22	9 teams eliminated from 2022-23 2nd League play-offs; 4 teams eliminated from 2022-23 1st League play-offs; 3 teams promoted from 2022-23 2nd League; 3 teams ranked 5th to 7th in 2022–23 Super League; 3 teams promoted from 2022-23 1st League	single leg; seedings applied; seeded teams play at home
Fifth round	8 December 2023	16-18 January 2024	32	32	28	4	4 teams ranked 1st to 4th in 2022–23 Super League	single leg; seedings applied; seeded teams play at home
Round of 16	22 January 2024	6-8 February 2024	16	16	16	0		single leg; seedings applied
Quarter-finals	12 February 2024	27-29 February 2024	8	8	8	0		single leg; seedings applied
Semi-finals	12 February 2024	23-24 April 2024; 7-8 May 2024	4	4	4	0		two legs
Final	12 February 2024	23 May 2024	2	2	2	0		single leg

== Preliminary round ==
28 Regional Amateur League teams competed in this round. No seeds were applied in the single-leg round. The draw was held on 12 September 2023. The match schedules were announced on 12 September 2023. 7 seeded and 7 unseeded teams qualified for the next round. Biggest upset was Kars 36 Spor (160) eliminating Dersimspor (137). Lowest-ranked team qualified for the next round was Kars 36 Spor (160). Highest-ranked team eliminated was Dersimspor (137).

Number of teams per tier still in competition
Super League	First League	Second League	Third League	Amateur League	Total
20 / 20	18 / 18	38 / 38	60 / 60	28 / 28	164 / 164

17 September 2023	12 Bingölspor	3–0	Hakkari Zapspor	Bingol
14:30	Altunbay 53'; Sürmeli 64'; Çebi 77'			Stadium: Bingöl Şehir

17 September 2023	Dersimspor	2–4 (a.e.t.)	Kars 36 Spor	Tunceli
14:30	Yorulmuş 4'; Dükme 76'		Topal 37' (pen.), 116'; Kaba 78'; Yıldırım 100'	Stadium: Tunceli Atatürk

17 September 2023	Doğubayazıt	2–0	Serhat Ardahanspor	Agri
14:30	Dayı 45+4'; Ergin 60'			Stadium: Doğubayazıt Doç. Dr. Yaşar Eryılmaz

17 September 2023	Kilis Belediyespor	0–1	Burdur MAKÜ Spor	Kilis
14:30			Özaydın 45+2'	Stadium: Kilis 7 Aralık

17 September 2023	Şırnak İdmanyurdu	2–0	Mazıdağı Fosfat	Sirnak
14:30	Bahşiş 29'; Gül 70'			Stadium: Şırnak Üniversite

17 September 2023	Çarşambaspor	2–0	Boyabat 1868 Spor	Samsun
15:00	Kaplan 43'; Kıcıkoğlu 77'			Stadium: Çarşamba Şehir

17 September 2023	Karadeniz Ereğli Belediye	0–0 (a.e.t.) (3–5 p)	Bartınspor	Zonguldak
15:00				Stadium: Şehit Vefa Karakurdu

17 September 2023	Kumluca Belediyespor	1–0 (a.e.t.)	Niğde Anadolu	Antalya
15:00	Şenol 101' (pen.)			Stadium: Kumluca İlçe

17 September 2023	Sincan Belediyespor	2–1 (a.e.t.)	Yozgat Bld. Bozokspor	Ankara
15:00	Özçakır 100'; Kazan 120+1'		Adiloğlu 97'	Stadium: Sincan 15 Temmuz Milli Birlik

17 September 2023	Bilecik 1969	2–0	Çankırı Saray 18	Bilecik
15:30	Tuş 5'; Gültepe 50'			Stadium: Bilecik Şeyh Edabali Üniversite

17 September 2023	Çorluspor	3–2 (a.e.t.)	Altınova Belediyespor	Tekirdag
15:30	Öz 36', 90+8'; Toker 93'		Kalço 29', 67'	Stadium: General Basri Asan

17 September 2023	Gölcükspor	2–0	Gebzespor	Kocaeli
15:30	Saykal 22' (o.g.); Okur 52'			Stadium: Gölcük Şehir

17 September 2023	Sökespor	0–0 (a.e.t.) (2–4 p)	Bigaspor	Aydin
15:30				Stadium: Söke Şehir

17 September 2023	Yunus Emre Belediye	1–2	Burhaniye Bld.	Eskisehir
15:30	Cengiz 40'		Kaya 45+1'; Recep 81'	Stadium: Necdet Yıldırım Futbol

== First round ==
48 Third League and 14 Regional Amateur League teams competed in this round. No seeds were applied in the single-leg round. The draw was held on 19 September 2023. The match schedules were announced on 19 September 2023. 11 seeded and 20 unseeded teams qualified for the next round. 23 Third League and 8 Regional Amateur League teams qualified for the next round. Biggest upset was Burdur MAKÜ Spor (155) eliminating Tarsus İdman Yurdu (79). Lowest-ranked team qualified for the next round was Bigaspor (159). Highest-ranked team eliminated was Batman Petrolspor (77).

Number of teams per tier still in competition
Super League	First League	Second League	Third League	Amateur League	Total
20 / 20	18 / 18	38 / 38	60 / 60	14 / 28	150 / 164

26 September 2023	Edirnespor	1–2	Çorluspor	Edirne
14:00	Kırım 83'		Toker 27'; Önal 86'	Stadium: Edirne 25 Kasım

26 September 2023	Muş 1984 Muşspor	4–0	Ağrı 1970 Spor	Mus
14:00	Tuna 1'; Çapkan 6'; İkikardeş 9'; Avşar 54'			Stadium: Muş Şehir

26 September 2023	Çatalcaspor	0–1	Büyükçekmece Tepecikspor	Istanbul
15:00			Eramil 80'	Stadium: Çatalca İzzettin

26 September 2023	Balıkesirspor	0–1	Burhaniye Bld.	Balikesir
17:30			Oruçoğlu 69'	Stadium: Balıkesir Atatürk

26 September 2023	Bornova 1877	4–0	Akhisarspor	Izmir
17:30	Erk 12'; Akbulut 20'; Baysal 40', 56'			Stadium: Bornova Aziz Kocaoğlu

27 September 2023	Bayburt Özel İdare Spor	2–2 (a.e.t.) (3–4 p)	Amber Çay Eynesil Bld.	Bayburt
14:00	Kazmaz 40'; Kılıç 70'		Evirgen 51' (pen.); Usta 82'	Stadium: Bayburt Genç Osman

27 September 2023	Çarşambaspor	1–7	Tokat Bld Plevnespor	Samsun
14:00	Aktaş 8'		Kıra 18'; Seres 33', 62'; Özbilen 51', 90+1'; Karademir 55'; Çelik 86'	Stadium: Çarşamba Şehir

27 September 2023	Erbaaspor	3–0	Fatsa Belediyespor	Tokat
14:00	Kaya 75', 89'; Tosun 85'			Stadium: Erbaa İlçe

4 October 2023	Kars 36 Spor	1–2	Doğubayazıt	Kars
14:00	Yıldırım 76'		Ergin 49' (pen.); Dayı 82' (pen.)	Stadium: Dr. Aba Müslüm Güven

27 September 2023	Mardin 1969 Spor	4–1 (a.e.t.)	Batman Petrolspor	Mardin
14:00	Kayabaş 12'; Özkan 107'; Yiğit 116'; Reis 119'		Behram 90+1'	Stadium: 21 Kasım Şehir

27 September 2023	Pazarspor	2–0	Gümüşhanespor	Rize
14:00	Eskiköy 37'; Güngör 57'			Stadium: Pazar İlçe

27 September 2023	Sebat Gençlik	4–0	1954 Kelkit Bld.Spor	Trabzon
14:00	Uluğ 26'; Kandemir 35', 89'; Uzun 74'			Stadium: Ortahisar Yavuz Selim

27 September 2023	Siirt İl Özel İdare	1–2 (a.e.t.)	Şırnak İdmanyurdu	Siirt
14:00	Uyanıker 70'		Yıldırım 83' (pen.), 101'	Stadium: Kurtalan İlçe

27 September 2023	Sivas 4 Eylül FAŞ	2–0	Amasyaspor Futbol Kulübü	Sivas
14:00	Gundak 10'; Aygür 89'			Stadium: Muhsin Yazıcıoğlu

27 September 2023	12 Bingölspor	1–2	23 Elazığ Futbol Kulübü	Bingol
14:00	Kaya 53'		Uzun 33'; Doğan 86'	Stadium: Bingöl Şehir

27 September 2023	Anadolu Üniversitesi	1–2	Sincan Belediyespor	Eskisehir
14:30	Karaal 32'		Can 16'; Özçakır 59'	Stadium: Osmangazi Üniversitesi

27 September 2023	Burdur MAKÜ Spor	2–1	Tarsus İdman Yurdu	Burdur
14:30	Şahin 10'; Aslan 86'		Yüksel 90+1' (o.g.)	Stadium: Burdur Gazi Atatürk

27 September 2023	Hacettepe 1945	3–0	Kırıkkalegücü	Ankara
14:30	Karslı 20'; Akpınar 29'; Çakmakçı 90+3' (o.g.)			Stadium: Osmanlı

27 September 2023	Kumluca Belediyespor	0–2	Silifke Belediye Spor	Antalya
14:30			Helvacı 15'; Özbey 69'	Stadium: Kumluca İlçe

27 September 2023	1922 Konyaspor	1–1 (a.e.t.) (3–4 p)	Talasgücü Belediyespor	Konya
14:30	Tüfekci 37'		Turan 10'	Stadium: Selçuk Üniversitesi 15 Temmuz

27 September 2023	Bigaspor	0–0 (a.e.t.) (4–1 p)	Bilecik 1969	Canakkale
15:00				Stadium: Çanakkale İlyas Bayram

27 September 2023	Bulvarspor	3–4 (a.e.t.)	Karabük İdmanyurdu Spor	Istanbul
15:00	Gürbüz 33' (pen.); Altan 57' (pen.); Güntay 76'		Sebat 18'; Apardı 40'; Türkyılmaz 45' (pen.), 92'	Stadium: Bulvar Mimar Kubilay Köse

27 September 2023	Bursa Yıldırımspor	2–0	İnegöl Kafkas GK	Bursa
15:00	Kaya 49'; Keklik 83'			Stadium: Minareli Çavuş Yıldırım

27 September 2023	Gölcükspor	3–0	Bartınspor	Kocaeli
15:00	Topçular 15'; Yağız 55'; Gümüşel 75'			Stadium: Gölcük İhsaniye

27 September 2023	Sapanca Gençlikspor	1–1 (a.e.t.) (4–3 p)	Darıca Gençlerbirliği	Sakarya
15:00	Tan 48'		Uzunoğlu 40'	Stadium: Sapanca Atatürk

27 September 2023	Silivrispor	2–0	Ergene Velimeşe	Istanbul
15:00	Yumurtacı 65'; Demir 68'			Stadium: Silivri Müjdat Gürsu

27 September 2023	Sultanbeyli Bld.	1–3 (a.e.t.)	K.Çekmece Sinopspor	Istanbul
15:00	Kılınç 41'		Ekinci 39'; Genç 97'; Aynacı 120+3' (pen.)	Stadium: Sultanbeyli Gölet

27 September 2023	Turgutluspor	1–3 (a.e.t.)	Aliağa Futbol A.Ş.	Manisa
15:00	Kanık 32'		Yaşar 43'; Yıldırım 113', 119'	Stadium: Turgutlu 7 Eylül

27 September 2023	Karşıyaka	2–0	Bergama Sportif FAŞ	Izmir
17:30	Çulcuoğlu 52' (o.g.); Durgun 89'			Stadium: Alsancak Mustafa Denizli

28 September 2023	Malatya Arguvanspor	2–1 (a.e.t.)	Elazığspor	Malatya
13:00	Gümüş 70'; Mirkovic 117'		Yasak 6'	Stadium: Arguvan İlçe

28 September 2023	Adana 1954 Futbol Kulübü	2–1	Osmaniyespor	Mersin
15:30	Koca 18'; Taşkın 36'		Solmaz 63'	Stadium: Tarsus İlçe

== Second round ==
19 Second League, 23 Third League and 8 Regional Amateur League teams competed in this round. Seeds were applied in the single-leg round. Seeded teams played at home. The draw was held on 29 September 2023. The match schedules were announced on 2 October 2023. 13 seeded and 12 unseeded teams qualified for the next round. 11 Second League, 10 Third League and 4 Regional Amateur League teams qualified to the next round. Biggest upset was Burdur MAKÜ Spor (155) eliminating Altınordu (39). Lowest-ranked team qualified for the next round was Bigaspor (159). Highest-ranked team eliminated was Altınordu (39).

Number of teams per tier still in competition
Super League	First League	Second League	Third League	Amateur League	Total
20 / 20	18 / 18	38 / 38	35 / 60	8 / 28	119 / 164

10 October 2023	Kırklarelispor	1–0	Çorluspor	Kirklareli
14:00	Özcan 21'			Stadium: Kırklarelispor Atatürk

10 October 2023	Kırşehir Futbol	2–0	Şırnak İdmanyurdu	Kirsehir
14:00	Çiçek 85'; Tütüncü 90+2'			Stadium: Kırşehir Ahi

10 October 2023	Isparta 32 Spor	1–0	Sincan Belediyespor	Isparta
17:00	Atila 76'			Stadium: Isparta Atatürk

10 October 2023	Bursaspor	1–2	Gölcükspor	Bursa
20:00	Yılmaz 73'		Yağız 22', 37'	Stadium: Sütaş Timsah

11 October 2023	Amber Çay Eynesil Bld.	0–2	Erbaaspor	Giresun
13:00			Güner 13', 69'	Stadium: Eynesil İlçe

11 October 2023	Kastamonuspor 1966	2–1 (a.e.t.)	Sebat Gençlik	Kastamonu
13:00	Keskin 10'; Yılmaz 103'		Uzun 74' (pen.)	Stadium: Kastamonu Gazi

11 October 2023	Muş 1984 Muşspor	2–0	K.Çekmece Sinopspor	Mus
13:00	Yıldırım 31'; Çakmak 50'			Stadium: Muş Şehir

11 October 2023	Zonguldak Kömürspor	2–3	Tokat Bld Plevnespor	Zonguldak
13:00	Öztürk 28' (pen.), 90+2'		Seres 3', 33', 70'	Stadium: Karaelmas Kemal Köksal

11 October 2023	Altınordu	0–1	Burdur MAKÜ Spor	Izmir
14:00			Bulut 50' (pen.)	Stadium: Hamdi Tüzün

11 October 2023	Arnavutköy Belediye	6–3 (a.e.t.)	Silivrispor	Istanbul
14:00	Türkyılmaz 45'; Özcan 50', 90+5', 92', 112'; Susancak 110'		Çavdar 21', 61'; Yumurtacı 81'	Stadium: Bolluca

11 October 2023	Etimesgut Belediyespor	3–2	Mardin 1969 Spor	Ankara
14:00	Alkan 45+2', 48', 90'		Beşir 33'; Reis 42'	Stadium: Etimesgut Belediyesi Atatürk

11 October 2023	İnegölspor	2–1 (a.e.t.)	Doğubayazıt	Bursa
14:00	Balcı 10'; Ötkün 119'		Ergin 23'	Stadium: İnegöl İlçe

11 October 2023	Menemen	1–0	Bursa Yıldırımspor	Izmir
14:00	Arslan 11'			Stadium: Menemen İlçe

11 October 2023	Nazilli Belediyespor	0–2	Hacettepe 1945	Aydin
14:00			Karslı 54', 78'	Stadium: Nazilli İlçe

11 October 2023	Sapanca Gençlikspor	1–2	Talasgücü Belediyespor	Sakarya
14:00	Yalçın 12'		Ersin 21', 44'	Stadium: Sapanca Atatürk

11 October 2023	Sarıyer	2–1 (a.e.t.)	Karabük İdmanyurdu Spor	Istanbul
14:00	Bekdemir 80', 103'		Apardı 23' (pen.)	Stadium: Maltepe Hasan Polat

11 October 2023	Serik Belediyespor	1–1 (a.e.t.) (2–4 p)	Malatya Arguvanspor	Antalya
14:00	Özdemir 89'		Aşcı 90+2'	Stadium: Serik İsmail Ogan

11 October 2023	Uşak Spor	1–4	Aliağa Futbol A.Ş.	Usak
14:00	Gürcan 76' (pen.)		Çelik 17', 84'; Kulet 27'; Koç 73'	Stadium: Uşak 1 Eylül

11 October 2023	Diyarbekir Spor	4–0	Büyükçekmece Tepecikspor	Diyarbakir
15:00	Papaker 75'; Genç 79'; Ceylan 86' (pen.); Çalışan 90+5'			Stadium: Diyarbakır

11 October 2023	Denizlispor	2–3	Burhaniye Bld.	Denizli
17:30	Sıngın 44'; Yıldırım 57'		K. Kaya 19' (pen.), 87'; M. Kaya 89'	Stadium: Denizli Atatürk

11 October 2023	Hes İlaç Afyonspor	2–1 (a.e.t.)	Adana 1954	Afyon
20:00	Alaeddinoğlu 53'; Gözütok 91'		Alzin 37'	Stadium: Zafer

12 October 2023	Adıyaman	0–2	Bornova 1877	Adiyaman
13:00			Destici 43'; Taylan 87'	Stadium: Kahta İlçe

12 October 2023	Pazarspor	2–0 (a.e.t.)	Silifke Belediye Spor	Rize
13:00	Dege 110', 117'			Stadium: Pazar İlçe

12 October 2023	Sivas 4 Eylül FAŞ	1–3	23 Elazığ Futbol Kulübü	Sivas
14:30	Doğan 19' (o.g.)		Kayalı 24'; Aslanoğlu 63', 79'	Stadium: Muhsin Yazıcıoğlu

12 October 2023	Karşıyaka	0–1	Bigaspor	Izmir
19:00			Arslan 45+1'	Stadium: Alsancak Mustafa Denizli

== Third round ==
10 Super League, 11 First League, 21 Second League, 22 Third League and 4 Regional Amateur League teams competed in this round. Seeds were applied in the single-leg round. Seeded teams played at home. The draw was held on 17 October 2023. The match schedules were announced on 19 October 2023. 27 seeded and 7 unseeded teams qualified for the next round. 9 Super League, 9 First League, 11 Second League and 5 Third League teams qualified to the next round. Biggest upset was Bornova 1877 (135) eliminating Karacabey Belediye Spor (50). Lowest-ranked team qualified for the next round was Bornova 1877 (135). Highest-ranked team eliminated was İstanbulspor (12).

Number of teams per tier still in competition
Super League	First League	Second League	Third League	Amateur League	Total
20 / 20	18 / 18	30 / 38	22 / 60	4 / 28	94 / 164

31 October 2023	Kasımpaşa	3–0	68 Aksaray Belediyespor	Istanbul
13:00	Özcan 21'; Winck 29' (pen.); Dilli 45+2'			Stadium: Recep Tayyip Erdoğan

31 October 2023	Gençlerbirliği	4–3 (a.e.t.)	Burdur MAKÜ Spor	Ankara
14:00	Bostan 4'; Karakullukçu 25', 90+4', 108'		Demirok 49'; Mercan 75'; Demir 90' (o.g.)	Stadium: Eryaman

31 October 2023	Keçiörengücü	4–2	Burhaniye Bld.	Ankara
14:00	Kaya 13' (o.g.); Camara 59'; Budak 64'; Dembele 65'		Recep 15', 39'	Stadium: Aktepe

31 October 2023	Manisa	3–0	Pazarspor	Manisa
14:00	Kiprit 18', 30'; Domgjoni 78'			Stadium: Mümin Özkasap

31 October 2023	Hes İlaç Afyonspor	1–3	Muş 1984 Muşspor	Afyon
15:00	Yakut 16'		Gedik 23', 27'; Çapkan 68'	Stadium: Zafer

31 October 2023	Hatayspor	2–0	Sarıyer	Istanbul
17:30	Strandberg 48'; Matondo 90+1'			Stadium: Atatürk Olimpiyat

31 October 2023	Alanyaspor	4–1	Belediye Kütahyaspor	Antalya
20:00	Sisto 27'; Janvier 34'; Anderson 43', 80'		Kök 63'	Stadium: Alanya Oba

1 November 2023	İstanbulspor	2–3 (a.e.t.)	Kepezspor FAŞ	Istanbul
13:00	Traore 39'; Mamadou 118'		Basravi 45+1' (pen.); Dursun 100', 115'	Stadium: Esenyurt Necmi Kadıoğlu

1 November 2023	Adanaspor	5–0	Hacettepe 1945	Adana
14:00	Sipahioğlu 59' (o.g.); Altunbaş 76' (pen.), 78'; Kot 86' (pen.); Katipoğlu 89'			Stadium: Yeni Adana

1 November 2023	Altay	2–1	Aliağa Futbol A.Ş.	Izmir
14:00	Uluç 44', 68'		Bakal 90+3'	Stadium: Alsancak Mustafa Denizli

1 November 2023	Arnavutköy Belediye	2–1	Gölcükspor	Istanbul
14:00	Aydın 27'; Susancak 88'		Okur 21'	Stadium: Bolluca

1 November 2023	Bandırmaspor	3–1	Alanya Kestelspor	Balikesir
14:00	Özışıkyıldız 4'; Saymak 69'; Bobadilla 73'		Taştan 88'	Stadium: Bandırma 17 Eylül

1 November 2023	Düzcespor	3–1	Kuşadasıspor	Duzce
14:00	Üner 24', 77'; Cengiz 88'		Tek 45+2'	Stadium: Düzce Şehir

1 November 2023	Etimesgut Belediyespor	1–0	Bigaspor	Ankara
14:00	Alkan 78'			Stadium: Etimesgut Belediyesi Atatürk

1 November 2023	Fethiyespor	0–1	Tokat Bld Plevnespor	Mugla
14:00			Özbilen 66' (pen.)	Stadium: Fethiye İlçe

1 November 2023	Giresunspor	1–1 (a.e.t.) (4–5 p)	Beyoğlu Yeniçarşıspor	Giresun
14:00	Savicevic 75'		Altunbaş 16'	Stadium: Çotanak
	Penalties
	Genç (penalty scored); Dik (penalty missed); Turhan (penalty scored); Çınar (penalty missed); Savicevic (penalty scored); Ceylan (penalty scored); Şenlikoğlu (penalty missed)		(penalty scored) Kılıç; (penalty missed) Uzun; (penalty missed) Gürel; (penalty scored) Ekinci; (penalty scored) Özer; (penalty scored) Başyiğit; (penalty scored) Kaya

1 November 2023	Kastamonuspor 1966	2–2 (a.e.t.) (4–2 p)	Ayvalıkgücü Belediyespor	Kastamonu
14:00	Açıkgöz 64'; Türk 90'		Fıstıkcı 52' (pen.); Turğut 84'	Stadium: Kastamonu Gazi
	Penalties
	Solmaz (penalty scored); Keskin (penalty scored); Eken (penalty scored); Türk (penalty scored)		(penalty missed) Uzunoğlu; (penalty scored) Aras; (penalty scored) Küçük; (penalty missed) Eratilla

1 November 2023	Isparta 32 Spor	3–0	Yeni Mersin İdman Yurdu	Isparta
14:00	Harlak 45+1', 71'; Canlı 55'			Stadium: Isparta Atatürk

1 November 2023	İnegölspor	1–2	Belediye Derincespor	Bursa
14:00	Altıntaş 13'		Bulucu 35'; Mayhoş 68' (pen.)	Stadium: İnegöl İlçe

1 November 2023	Karacabey Belediye Spor	0–4	Bornova 1877	Bursa
14:00			Arslan 5'; Eyolcu 52'; Türkdoğan 65'; Baysal 84'	Stadium: Karacabey M. Fehmi Gerçeker

1 November 2023	Kırklarelispor	1–0 (a.e.t.)	Karaköprü Belediyespor	Kirklareli
14:00	Derici 102'			Stadium: Kırklareli Atatürk

1 November 2023	Kırşehir Futbol	3–0	23 Elazığ	Kirsehir
14:00	Üge 22'; Kuzey 45+1'; Şahin 79'			Stadium: Kırşehir Ahi

1 November 2023	Menemen	2–0	Nevşehir Belediyespor	Izmir
14:00	Açıkgöz 59'; Şahintürk 61'			Stadium: Tire Gazi Mustafa Kemal Atatürk

1 November 2023	Somaspor	6–0	Talasgücü Belediyespor	Manisa
14:00	Demirli 22'; Can 24', 45+2', 52'; Kazar 72'; Destan 89'			Stadium: Soma Atatürk

1 November 2023	Tuzlaspor	1–2	Çankaya	Istanbul
14:00	Akkan 15'		Sevinç 53'; Delimehmet 89'	Stadium: Sancaktepe 15 Temmuz

1 November 2023	Ümraniyespor	5–1	Orduspor 1967	Istanbul
14:00	Glumac 3'; Demir 6'; Okutan 39'; Arıcı 67'; Klonaridis 81'		Eser 19'	Stadium: Ümraniye Şehir

1 November 2023	Boluspor	2–0	Karaman	Bolu
15:00	Artuç 11'; İşçiler 25'			Stadium: Bolu Atatürk

1 November 2023	MKE Ankaragücü	2–0	Malatya Arguvanspor	Ankara
16:30	Morutan 64'; Macheda 77'			Stadium: Eryaman

1 November 2023	Erzurumspor	1–0 (a.e.t.)	Diyarbekir Spor	Erzurum
18:30	Özfesli 96'			Stadium: Erzurum Kazım Karabekir

1 November 2023	Antalyaspor	3–0	52 Orduspor	Antalya
20:30	Assombalonga 38' (pen.), 72'; Uzun 79' (pen.)			Stadium: Corendon Airlines Park Antalya

2 November 2023	Sivasspor	4–0	Artvin Hopaspor	Sivas
13:00	Manaj 6', 35', 42'; Kaya 87'			Stadium: BG Grup 4 Eylül

2 November 2023	Gaziantep	4–0	Efeler 09 Spor	Gaziantep
15:00	Markovic 5' (pen.); Karakaş 45+1'; Draguş 58'; Riascos 77'			Stadium: Kalyon

2 November 2023	Konyaspor	3–0	Erbaaspor	Konya
17:30	Muric 55'; Gedikli 85'; Prip 90+2'			Stadium: Medaş Konya Büyükşehir

2 November 2023	Kayserispor	4–0 (a.e.t.)	Iğdır Futbol Kulübü	Kayseri
20:00	Aylton 97', 100'; Bahoken 107'; Cardoso 120'			Stadium: RHG Enertürk Enerji

== Fourth round ==
15 Super League, 16 First League, 20 Second League and 5 Third League teams competed in this round. Seeds were applied in the single-leg round. Seeded teams played at home. The draw was held on 7 November 2023. The match schedules were announced on 13 November 2023. 26 seeded and 2 unseeded teams qualified for the next round. 15 Super League, 11 First League and 2 Second League teams qualified to the next round. Biggest upset was Kırklarelispor (61) eliminating Altay (31). Lowest-ranked team qualified for the next round was Kırklarelispor (61). Highest-ranked team eliminated was Altay (31).

Number of teams per tier still in competition
Super League	First League	Second League	Third League	Amateur League	Total
19 / 20	16 / 18	20 / 38	5 / 60	0 / 28	60 / 164

5 December 2023	Fatih Karagümrük	3–1	Belediye Derincespor	Istanbul
13:00	Dresevic 19'; Şeker 37' (o.g.); Dursun 49'		Baydemir 63' (pen.)	Stadium: Atatürk Olimpiyat

5 December 2023	Keçiörengücü	2–1	Muş 1984 Muşspor	Ankara
13:00	Dembele 66'; Sarman 79'		Çakmak 57'	Stadium: Aktepe

5 December 2023	Pendikspor	5–3	Isparta 32 Spor	Istanbul
15:00	Thuram 16'; Romero 29'; Hassan 54', 61', 63'		Çoban 35'; Harlak 74'; Küçükdurmuş 84'	Stadium: Pendik

5 December 2023	Antalyaspor	6–1	Kepezspor FAŞ	Antalya
17:00	Holtmann 11' van de Streek 43'; Larsson 64'; Assombalonga 72', 82'; Öztürk 86'		Dursun 45+2'	Stadium: Corendon Airlines Park Antalya

5 December 2023	Samsunspor	3–0	Tokat Bld Plevnespor	Samsun
19:00	Kara 23'; Fofana 61'; Deniz 85'			Stadium: Yeni 19 Mayıs

5 December 2023	Alanyaspor	1–0	Kocaelispor	Antalya
21:00	Balkovec 23'			Stadium: Alanya Oba

6 December 2023	Bandırmaspor	3–1	Somaspor	Balikesir
13:00	Mimaroğlu 16'; Berişbek 76'; Yiğit 90+2'		Akgün 79'	Stadium: Bandırma 17 Eylül

6 December 2023	Bodrum	2–1	Menemen	Mugla
13:00	Aldair 45+4' (pen.); Brazao 60' (pen.)		Şahintürk 13'	Stadium: Bodrum İlçe

6 December 2023	Erzurumspor	0–3 (a.e.t.)	24 Erzincanspor	Erzurum
13:00			Kaya 97', 114'; Yılmaz 109' (pen.)	Stadium: Erzurum Kazım Karabekir

6 December 2023	Kasımpaşa	4–1	Kırşehir Belediyespor	Istanbul
13:00	Gomis 5'; Çetinkaya 43', 61', 80' (pen.)		Varol 78' (pen.)	Stadium: Recep Tayyip Erdoğan

6 December 2023	Adanaspor	2–0	Esenler Erokspor	Adana
14:00	Tuzun 55'; Altunbaş 87'			Stadium: Yeni Adana

6 December 2023	Altay	2–3	Kırklarelispor	Izmir
14:00	Uluç 58' (pen.); Öztürk 89'		Taş 10'; Derici 49' (pen.), 71'	Stadium: Alsancak Mustafa Denizli

6 December 2023	Boluspor	1–0	Amed Sportif	Bolu
14:00	Sönmez 37' (pen.)			Stadium: Bolu Atatürk

6 December 2023	Eyüpspor	3–1	Ankara Demirspor	Istanbul
14:00	Demir 15'; Demirok 25' (pen.), 37'		Tankul 65'	Stadium: Eyüp

6 December 2023	Gençlerbirliği	4–1	Bornova 1877	Ankara
14:00	Karakullukçu 46'; Rodrigues 55'; Bostan 59'; Akgül 90+3'		Şentürk 71'	Stadium: Eryaman

6 December 2023	Göztepe	3–0	1461 Trabzon	Izmir
14:00	Kanatsızkuş 63'; Traore 78', 79'			Stadium: Göztepe Gürsel Aksel

6 December 2023	Sakaryaspor	1–0	Ankaraspor	Sakarya
14:00	Ndlovu 80'			Stadium: Yeni Sakarya Atatürk

6 December 2023	Ümraniyespor	2–1	Çankaya	Istanbul
14:00	Babacan 6'; Ayık 76'		Korkmaz 79'	Stadium: Ümraniye Şehir

6 December 2023	Konyaspor	3–0	Beyoğlu Yeniçarşıspor	Konya
15:00	Gedikli 14'; Mallı 34'; Paz 74'			Stadium: Medaş Konya Büyükşehir Belediye

6 December 2023	Hatayspor	2–1	Düzcespor	Mersin
17:00	Hodzic 22', 58'		Zorlu 28' (pen.)	Stadium: Yeni Mersin

6 December 2023	Kayserispor	4–0	Vanspor	Kayseri
19:00	Özbek 14', 65'; Çeltik 19'; Erkip 69'			Stadium: RHG Enertürk Enerji

6 December 2023	Trabzonspor	3–1	Çorum	Trabzon
21:00	Fountas 3'; Destan 19'; Bakasetas 61'		Verheydt 16'	Stadium: Papara Park

7 December 2023	Manisa	3–0	Kastamonuspor 1966	Manisa
13:00	Kahya 47'; Emeksiz 52'; Kiprit 57'			Stadium: Mümin Özkasap

7 December 2023	Sivasspor	2–1	Arnavutköy Belediye	Sivas
13:00	Arslan 19' (pen.); Musa 25'		Özcan 45'	Stadium: BG Grup 4 Eylül

7 December 2023	Gaziantep	2–1 (a.e.t.)	Etimesgut Belediyespor	Gaziantep
15:00	Kızıldağ 45+3'; Karakaş 93'		Küçük 90+1'	Stadium: Kalyon

7 December 2023	MKE Ankaragücü	3–1	İskenderunspor	Ankara
17:00	Bajić 16' (pen.); Bekiroğlu 68'; Chatzigiovanis 75'		Yokuşlu 22'	Stadium: Eryaman

7 December 2023	Çaykur Rizespor	4–0	Bucaspor 1928	Rize
19:00	Gaich 41', 47', 88'; Varesanovic 70'			Stadium: Çaykur Didi

7 December 2023	İstanbul Başakşehir	2–0	Şanlıurfaspor	Istanbul
21:00	Pelkas 63'; İlkhan 72'			Stadium: Başakşehir Fatih Terim

== Bracket ==
Fifth round
MKE Ankaragücü	3
Çaykur Rizespor	1
Adana Demirspor	2 (6)
24 Erzincanspor (pen.)	2 (7)
Gaziantep	1
Bodrum	0
Fenerbahçe	6
Adanaspor	0
Antalyaspor	2
Pendikspor	1
Beşiktaş	4
Eyüpspor	0
Sivasspor	3
Keçiörengücü	2
Konyaspor (a.e.t.)	3
Göztepe	2
Kayserispor	1
Gençlerbirliği	2
Trabzonspor	3
Manisa	1
İstanbul Başakşehir	1
Boluspor	0
Hatayspor	5
Sakaryaspor	1
Galatasaray	4
Ümraniyespor	1
Kasımpaşa	0
Bandırmaspor	1
Fatih Karagümrük	2
Kırklarelispor	0
Alanyaspor	1
Samsunspor (a.e.t.)	3

Round of 16
MKE Ankaragücü	5
24 Erzincanspor	1
Gaziantep	0
Fenerbahçe	2
Antalyaspor	1
Beşiktaş	2
Sivasspor	0
Konyaspor (a.e.t.)	1
Gençlerbirliği	1
Trabzonspor (a.e.t.)	2
İstanbul Başakşehir (pen.)	1 (3)
Hatayspor	1 (2)
Galatasaray	4
Bandırmaspor	2
Fatih Karagümrük	2
Samsunspor	1

Quarter-finals
MKE Ankaragücü	3
Fenerbahçe	0
Beşiktaş	2
Konyaspor	0
Trabzonspor	1
İstanbul Başakşehir	0
Galatasaray	0
Fatih Karagümrük	2

Semi-finals
MKE Ankaragücü	0	0	0
Beşiktaş	0	1	1
Trabzonspor	3	4	7
Fatih Karagümrük	2	0	2

Final
Beşiktaş	3
Trabzonspor	2

== Fifth round ==
19 Super League, 11 First League and 2 Second League teams have been qualified to this round. Seeding have been applied in the single-leg round and seeded teams are going to play at home. The draw was held on 8 December 2023. The match schedules were announced on 26 December 2023. 12 seeded and 4 unseeded teams qualified for the next round. 13 Super League, 2 First League and 1 Second League teams qualified to the next round. Biggest upset was 24Erzincanspor (47) eliminating Adana Demirspor (4). Lowest-ranked team qualified for the next round was 24Erzincanspor (47). Highest-ranked team eliminated was Adana Demirspor (4).

Number of teams per tier still in competition
Super League	First League	Second League	Third League	Amateur League	Total
19 / 20	11 / 18	2 / 38	0 / 60	0 / 28	32 / 164

16 January 2024	Fatih Karagümrük	2–0	Kırklarelispor	Istanbul
13:00	Dursun 54', 84'			Stadium: Atatürk Olimpiyat

16 January 2024	Kasımpaşa	0–1	Bandırmaspor	Istanbul
15:00			Mimaroğlu 40'	Stadium: Recep Tayyip Erdoğan

16 January 2024	Hatayspor	5–1	Sakaryaspor	Mersin
17:00	Strandberg 4', 23', 31', 90'; Dele-Bashiru 41'		Dimitrov 19'	Stadium: Yeni Mersin

16 January 2024	MKE Ankaragücü	3–1	Çaykur Rizespor	Ankara
19:00	Güneren 57'; Ciğerci 90+7' (pen.); Moruțan 90+11' (pen.)		Pala 83'	Stadium: Eryaman

16 January 2024	Beşiktaş	4–0	Eyüpspor	Istanbul
21:00	Uçan 17'; Tosun 36' (pen.), 68'; Rebić 87'			Stadium: Beşiktaş Park

17 January 2024	Antalyaspor	2–1	Pendikspor	Antalya
13:00	Akyol 50'; van de Streek 58'		Nayir 32'	Stadium: Corendon Airlines Park Antalya

17 January 2024	İstanbul Başakşehir	1–0	Boluspor	Istanbul
13:00	Kény 19'			Stadium: Başakşehir Fatih Terim

17 January 2024	Gaziantep	1–0	Bodrum	Gaziantep
15:00	Djilobodji 90+6'			Stadium: Kalyon

17 January 2024	Alanyaspor	1–3 (a.e.t.)	Samsunspor	Antalya
17:00	Altıntaş 17'		Gümüşkaya 73'; Aydoğdu 91'; Özbaskıcı 120+1'	Stadium: Alanya Oba

17 January 2024	Adana Demirspor	2–2 (a.e.t.) (6–7 p)	24 Erzincanspor	Adana
19:00	Michut 89'; Akbaba 90+2'		Alkurt 65'; Yiğiter 77'	Stadium: Yeni Adana
	Penalties
	Akbaba (penalty scored); Nani (penalty scored); David (penalty scored); Gravillon (penalty scored); Erdoğan (penalty scored); Michut (penalty scored); Manev (penalty missed)		(penalty scored) İçer; (penalty scored) Alkurt; (penalty scored) Yılmaz; (penalty scored) Taşdelen; (penalty scored) Payal; (penalty scored) Işıkdemir; (penalty scored) Yiğiter

17 January 2024	Fenerbahçe	6–0	Adanaspor	Istanbul
21:00	Lincoln 29'; Batshuayi 39', 50', 68', 72'; Yandaş 81'			Stadium: Ülker

18 January 2024	Sivasspor	3–2	Keçiörengücü	Sivas
13:00	Erdal 10'; Koita 51'; Manaj 82'		Dembélé 52', 65' (pen.)	Stadium: BG Grup 4 Eylül

18 January 2024	Kayserispor	1–2	Gençlerbirliği	Kayseri
15:00	Sarıarslan 23'		Aosman 34' (pen.), 90+5'	Stadium: RHG Enertürk Enerji

18 January 2024	Konyaspor	2–1 (a.e.t.)	Göztepe	Konya
17:00	Ülgün 75'; Prip 105+1'		Héliton 60'	Stadium: Medaş Konya Büyükşehir

18 January 2024	Trabzonspor	3–1	Manisa	Trabzon
19:00	Fountas 7'; Destan 28', 69'		Korenica 15'	Stadium: Papara Park

18 January 2024	Galatasaray	4–1	Ümraniyespor	Istanbul
21:00	Yılmaz 33'; Tetê 42'; Bardakçı 57'; Dervişoğlu 87' (pen.)		Yılmaz 23' (o.g.)	Stadium: Ali Sami Yen

== Round of 16 ==
13 Super League, 2 First League and 1 Second League teams have been qualified to this round. Seeding have been applied in the single-leg round. The draw was held on 22 January 2024. The match schedules were announced on 26 January 2024.

Number of teams per tier still in competition
Super League	First League	Second League	Third League	Amateur League	Total
13 / 20	2 / 18	1 / 38	0 / 60	0 / 28	16 / 164

6 February 2024	Fatih Karagümrük	2–1	Samsunspor	Istanbul
14:30	Biraschi 72'; Paoletti 89'		Mouandilmadji 68'	Stadium: Atatürk Olimpiyat

6 February 2024	MKE Ankaragücü	5–1	24 Erzincanspor	Ankara
17:30	Ciğerci 37'; Pedrinho 44'; Radaković 51'; Macheda 65'; Astanakulov 90+2'		Aynaoğlu 59'	Stadium: Eryaman

6 February 2024	Galatasaray	4–2	Bandırmaspor	Istanbul
20:45	Sánchez 27'; Dervişoğlu 37' (pen.); Tetê 41' (pen.); Carlos Vinícius 90+5'		Piçinciol 45+4'; Mulumba 76'	Stadium: Ali Sami Yen

7 February 2024	Sivasspor	0–1 (a.e.t.)	Konyaspor	Sivas
14:30			Oğuz 109'	Stadium: BG Grup 4 Eylül

7 February 2024	İstanbul Başakşehir	1–1 (a.e.t.) (3–2 p)	Hatayspor	Istanbul
17:30	Kény 23'		Massanga 58'	Stadium: Başakşehir Fatih Terim
	Penalties
	Szysz (penalty missed); Ba (penalty scored); Türüç (penalty missed); Özcan (penalty scored); Opoku (penalty scored)		(penalty missed) Rivas; (penalty missed) Sağlam; (penalty scored) Massanga; (penalty scored) Sinik; (penalty missed) Strandberg

7 February 2024	Gaziantep	0–2	Fenerbahçe	Gaziantep
20:45			Batshuayi 17' (pen.), 31'	Stadium: Kalyon

8 February 2024	Gençlerbirliği	1–2 (a.e.t.)	Trabzonspor	Ankara
17:30	Bostan 14'		Elmalı 90'; Trézéguet 105+1'	Stadium: Eryaman

8 February 2024	Antalyaspor	1–2	Beşiktaş	Antalya
20:45	Bytyqi 30'		Muleka 72', 89'	Stadium: Corendon Airlines Park Antalya

== Quarter-finals ==
Eight Süper Lig teams qualified for this round. Seeding was applied in the single-leg round. The draw was held on 12 February 2024. The match schedules were announced on 16 February 2024.

Number of teams per tier still in competition
Super League	First League	Second League	Third League	Amateur League	Total
8 / 20	0 / 18	0 / 38	0 / 60	0 / 28	8 / 164

27 February 2024	MKE Ankaragücü	3–0	Fenerbahçe	Ankara
20:45	Moruțan 10'; Chatzigiovanis 33'; Rodrigues 87'	Report		Stadium: Eryaman Stadium

28 February 2024	Trabzonspor	1–0	İstanbul Başakşehir	Trabzon
17:30	Višća 57'	Report		Stadium: Papara Park

28 February 2024	Beşiktaş	2–0	Konyaspor	Istanbul
20:45	Uçan 32'; Tosun 58'	Report		Stadium: Beşiktaş Stadium

29 February 2024	Galatasaray	0–2	Fatih Karagümrük	Istanbul
20:45		Report	Marcão 6'; Mendes 84'	Stadium: Rams Park

== Semi-finals ==
The match schedules for the first leg were announced on 28 March 2024. The match schedules for the second leg were announced on 19 April 2024.

=== Summary table ===
Team 1	Agg.	Team 2	1st leg	2nd leg
MKE Ankaragücü	0–1	Beşiktaş	0–0	0–1
Trabzonspor	7–2	Fatih Karagümrük	3–2	4–0

=== First leg ===
23 April 2024	MKE Ankaragücü	0–0	Beşiktaş	Ankara
20:30				Stadium: Eryaman Stadium

24 April 2024	Trabzonspor	3–2	Fatih Karagümrük	Trabzon
20:30	Visca 15'; Denswil 41'; Fountas 49'		Mendes 22'; Paoletti 80'	Stadium: Papara Park

=== Second leg ===
7 May 2024	Beşiktaş	1–0	MKE Ankaragücü	Istanbul
20:30	Muçi 70'			Stadium: Beşiktaş Stadium; Referee: Zorbay Küçük

8 May 2024	Fatih Karagümrük	0–4	Trabzonspor	Istanbul
20:30			Onuachu 54'; Fountas 69'; Bozok 73' (pen.), 77'	Stadium: Atatürk Olympic Stadium; Referee: Cihan Aydın

== Final ==
The final was contested between Beşiktaş and Trabzonspor, with the former coming out as 3-2 winners.

23 May 2024	Beşiktaş	3–2	Trabzonspor	Istanbul
20:45 TRT (UTC+3)	Ghezzal 45+3' (pen.); Uçan 54'; Al-Musrati 90+4'	Report	Onuachu 13'; Pépé 89'	Stadium: Atatürk Olympic Stadium; Attendance: 60,464; Referee: Ali Şansalan

== Top scorers ==
Rank	Player	Club	Goals
1	(Belgium) Michy Batshuayi	Fenerbahçe	6
2	(Turkey) Burak Seres	Tokat Bld Plevnespor	5
2	(Sweden) Carlos Strandberg	Hatayspor	5
2	(Turkey) Harun Özcan	Arnavutköy Belediye	5
5	(Democratic Republic of the Congo) Britt Assombalonga	Antalyaspor	4
5	(France) Malaly Dembélé	Keçiörengücü	4
5	(Turkey) Oltan Karakullukçu	Gençlerbirliği	4
5	(Albania) Rey Manaj	Sivasspor	4
5	(Greece) Taxiarchis Fountas	Trabzonspor	4
5	(Turkey) Yakup Alkan	Etimesgut Belediyespor	4

== Seedings ==
Seed	Team	Round	2023-24	2022-23	Rank	Seed	Team	Round	2023-24	2022-23	Rank	Seed	Team	Round	2023-24	2022-23	Rank
1	Fenerbahçe	5R	SL	SL	CW	56	Serik Belediyespor	2R	2L	2L	10 (1.32)	111	Hacettepe 1945	1R	3L	3L	12 (1.06; -9)
2	Galatasaray	5R	SL	SL	1	57	Hes İlaç Afyonspor	2R	2L	2L	10 (1.31)	112	Turgutluspor	1R	3L	3L	12 (1.06; -13)
3	Beşiktaş	5R	SL	SL	3	58	İnegölspor	2R	2L	2L	11 (1.31)	113	Erbaaspor	1R	3L	3L	13 (1.15)
4	Adana Demirspor	5R	SL	SL	4	59	Kırşehir Futbol	2R	2L	2L	11 (1.26)	114	Ağrı 1970 Spor	1R	3L	3L	13 (1.06)
5	İstanbul Başakşehir	4R	SL	SL	5	60	Isparta 32 Spor	2R	2L	2L	12 (1.28)	115	Ergene Velimeşe	1R	3L	3L	13 (1)
6	Trabzonspor	4R	SL	SL	6	61	Kırklarelispor	2R	2L	2L	12 (1.21)	116	Akhisarspor	1R	3L	3L	14 (1.06)
7	Fatih Karagümrük	4R	SL	SL	7	62	Arnavutköy Belediye	2R	2L	2L	13 (1.28)	117	Edirnespor	1R	3L	3L	14 (1.03)
8	Konyaspor	3R	SL	SL	8	63	Etimesgut Belediyespor	2R	2L	2L	13 (1.18)	118	Darıca Gençlerbirliği	1R	3L	3L	14 (1)
9	Kayserispor	3R	SL	SL	9	64	Bursaspor	2R	2L	2L	14 (1.28)	119	1954 Kelkit Bld.Spor	1R	3L	3L	15 (1.03)
10	Kasımpaşa	3R	SL	SL	10	65	Kastamonuspor 1966	2R	2L	2L	14 (1.13)	120	Fatsa Belediyespor	1R	3L	3L	15 (0.91)
11	MKE Ankaragücü	3R	SL	SL	11	66	Nazilli Belediyespor	2R	2L	2L	15 (1.28)	121	Osmaniyespor	1R	3L	3L	16 (0.94)
12	İstanbulspor	3R	SL	SL	12	67	Sarıyer	2R	2L	2L	15 (1.11)	122	Malatya Arguvanspor	1R	3L	3L	17 (0.79)
13	Antalyaspor	3R	SL	SL	13	68	Uşak Spor	2R	2L	2L	16 (0.87)	123	Mardin 1969 Spor	1R	3L	AL	1 (2.62)
14	Sivasspor	3R	SL	SL	14	69	Adıyaman	2R	2L	2L	19 (0.62)	124	Sebat Gençlik	1R	3L	AL	1 (2.54)
15	Alanyaspor	3R	SL	SL	15	70	Diyarbekir Spor	2R	2L	2L	20 (0.41)	125	Tokat Bld Plevnespor	1R	3L	AL	1 (2.5; +54)
16	Gaziantep	3R	SL	SL	18	71	Iğdır	3R	2L	3L	1 (2.22)	126	Anadolu Üniversitesi	1R	3L	AL	1 (2.5; +51)
17	Hatayspor	3R	SL	SL	19	72	68 Aksaray Belediyespor	3R	2L	3L	1 (2.15)	127	İnegöl Kafkas	1R	3L	AL	1 (2.5; +46)
18	Samsunspor	4R	SL	1L	1	73	Yeni Mersin İdman Yurdu	3R	2L	3L	1 (2)	128	Adana 1954 Futbol Kulübü	1R	3L	AL	1 (2.47)
19	Çaykur Rizespor	4R	SL	1L	2	74	Belediye Derincespor	3R	2L	3L	2 (1.94)	129	Aliağa Futbol A.Ş.	1R	3L	AL	1 (2.42)
20	Pendikspor	4R	SL	1L	3	75	Karaman Futbol Kulübü	3R	2L	3L	4 (2.03)	130	Silivrispor	1R	3L	AL	1 (2.35; +43)
21	Giresunspor	3R	1L	SL	16	76	Beyoğlu Yeniçarşıspor	3R	2L	3L	4 (1.74)	131	Sultanbeyli Bld.	1R	3L	AL	1 (2.35; +33)
22	Ümraniyespor	3R	1L	SL	17	77	Batman Petrolspor	1R	3L	2L	16 (1.25)	132	Talasgücü Belediyespor	1R	3L	AL	1 (2.31)
23	Bodrumspor	4R	1L	1L	4	78	Balıkesirspor	1R	3L	2L	17 (0.66)	133	K.Çekmece Sinopspor	1R	3L	AL	1 (2.27)
24	Sakaryaspor	4R	1L	1L	5	79	Tarsus İdman Yurdu	1R	3L	2L	17 (0.58)	134	Karabük İdmanyurdu Spor	1R	3L	AL	1 (2.19)
25	Eyüpspor	4R	1L	1L	6	80	Pazarspor	1R	3L	2L	18 (0.61)	135	Bornova 1877	1R	3L	AL	1 (2)
26	Göztepe	4R	1L	1L	7	81	Bayburt Özel İdare Spor	1R	3L	2L	18 (0.53)	136	Silifke Belediye Spor	1R	3L	AL	2 (2.13)
27	Manisa	3R	1L	1L	8	82	Sivas 4 Eylül FAŞ	1R	3L	2L	19 (0.42)	137	Dersimspor	PR	AL	AL	2 (2.4)
28	Keçiörengücü	3R	1L	1L	9	83	Alanya Kestelspor	3R	3L	3L	2 (2.16)	138	Doğubayazıt	PR	AL	AL	2 (2.35; +42; 56)
29	Bandırmaspor	3R	1L	1L	10	84	Kepezspor FAŞ	3R	3L	3L	2 (2.12)	139	Gebzespor	PR	AL	AL	2 (2.35; +42; 56)
30	Boluspor	3R	1L	1L	11	85	Orduspor 1967	3R	3L	3L	3 (2.06)	140	Sincan Belediyespor	PR	AL	AL	2 (2.31)
31	Altay	3R	1L	1L	12	86	Belediye Kütahyaspor	3R	3L	3L	3 (1.91)	141	Mazıdağı Fosfat	PR	AL	AL	2 (2.27)
32	Erzurumspor	3R	1L	1L	13	87	Efeler 09 Spor	3R	3L	3L	3 (1.76)	142	Çorluspor 1947	PR	AL	AL	2 (2.23; +43)
33	Tuzlaspor	3R	1L	1L	14	88	52 Orduspor	3R	3L	3L	4 (1.88)	143	Gölcükspor	PR	AL	AL	2 (2.23; +35)
34	Gençlerbirliği	3R	1L	1L	15	89	Çankaya	3R	3L	3L	5 (1.74)	144	Kumluca Belediyespor	PR	AL	AL	2 (2.19)
35	Adanaspor	3R	1L	1L	17	90	Nevşehir Belediyespor	3R	3L	3L	5 (1.71)	145	Çarşambaspor	PR	AL	AL	2 (2.08)
36	Kocaelispor	4R	1L	2L	1 (2.21)	91	Ayvalıkgücü Belediyespor	3R	3L	3L	5 (1.69)	146	Yunus Emre Belediye	PR	AL	AL	2 (2.04)
37	Çorum	4R	1L	2L	1 (2.19)	92	Artvin Hopaspor	3R	3L	3L	6 (1.71)	147	Sökespor	PR	AL	AL	2 (2; +27)
38	Şanlıurfaspor	4R	1L	2L	2 (2.08)	93	Karaköprü Belediyespor	3R	3L	3L	6 (1.65)	148	Karadeniz Ereğli Belediye	PR	AL	AL	2 (2; +26)
39	Altınordu	2R	2L	1L	16	94	Kuşadasıspor	3R	3L	3L	6 (1.59)	149	Burhaniye Bld.	PR	AL	AL	2 (1.96)
40	Denizlispor	2R	2L	1L	18	95	Karşıyaka	1R	3L	3L	7 (1.59)	150	Altınova Belediyespor	PR	AL	AL	3 (2.19)
41	Bucaspor 1928	4R	2L	2L	2 (2.13)	96	Sapanca Gençlikspor	1R	3L	3L	7 (1.53)	151	Bartınspor	PR	AL	AL	3 (1.88)
42	İskenderunspor	4R	2L	2L	3 (2.03)	97	Amber Çay Eynesil Bld.	1R	3L	3L	7 (1.28)	152	Yozgat Bld. Bozokspor	PR	AL	AL	4 (1.96)
43	Esenler Erokspor	4R	2L	2L	3 (1.72)	98	Muş 1984 Muşspor	1R	3L	3L	8 (1.38)	153	Şırnak İdmanyurdu	PR	AL	AL	5 (1.73)
44	1461 Trabzon	4R	2L	2L	4 (1.95)	99	Çatalcaspor	1R	3L	3L	8 (1.29)	154	Kilis Belediyespor	PR	AL	AL	6 (1.53)
45	Amed Sportif	4R	2L	2L	4 (1.67)	100	Bulvarspor	1R	3L	3L	8 (1.25)	155	Burdur MAKÜ Spor	PR	AL	AL	8 (1.54)
46	Vanspor	4R	2L	2L	5 (1.95)	101	Bursa Yıldırımspor	1R	3L	3L	9 (1.29; +3)	156	12 Bingölspor	PR	AL	AL	8 (1.47)
47	24Erzincanspor	4R	2L	2L	5 (1.61)	102	Amasyaspor	1R	3L	3L	9 (1.29; -3)	157	Niğde Belediye Spor	PR	AL	AL	9 (1.31)
48	Ankara Demirspor	4R	2L	2L	6 (1.87)	103	Gümüşhanespor	1R	3L	3L	9 (1.16)	158	Bilecik 1969	PR	AL	AL	9 (1.19)
49	Ankaraspor	4R	2L	2L	6 (1.61)	104	Büyükçekmece Tepecikspor	1R	3L	3L	10 (1.29)	159	Bigaspor	PR	AL	AL	9 (1.12)
50	Karacabey Belediye Spor	3R	2L	2L	7 (1.79)	105	Elazığspor	1R	3L	3L	10 (1.24)	160	Kars 36 Spor	PR	AL	AL	9 (1)
51	Somaspor	3R	2L	2L	7 (1.58)	106	23 Elazığ	1R	3L	3L	10 (1.16)	161	Boyabat 1868 Spor	PR	AL	AL	11 (0.96)
52	Fethiyespor	3R	2L	2L	8 (1.45)	107	Bergama Sportif FAŞ	1R	3L	3L	11 (1.26)	162	Serhat Ardahan	PR	AL	AL	11 (0.92)
53	Düzcespor	3R	2L	2L	8 (1.44)	108	1922 Konyaspor	1R	3L	3L	11 (1.21)	163	Çankırı Saray 18	PR	AL	N.A.	N.A.
54	Menemen	2R	2L	2L	9 (1.42)	109	Kırıkkalegücü	1R	3L	3L	11 (1.13)	164	Hakkari Zapspor	PR	AL	N.A.	N.A.
55	Zonguldak Kömürspor	2R	2L	2L	9 (1.39)	110	Siirt İl Özel İdare	1R	3L	3L	12 (1.24)						
