= 2024 Turkish Cup final =

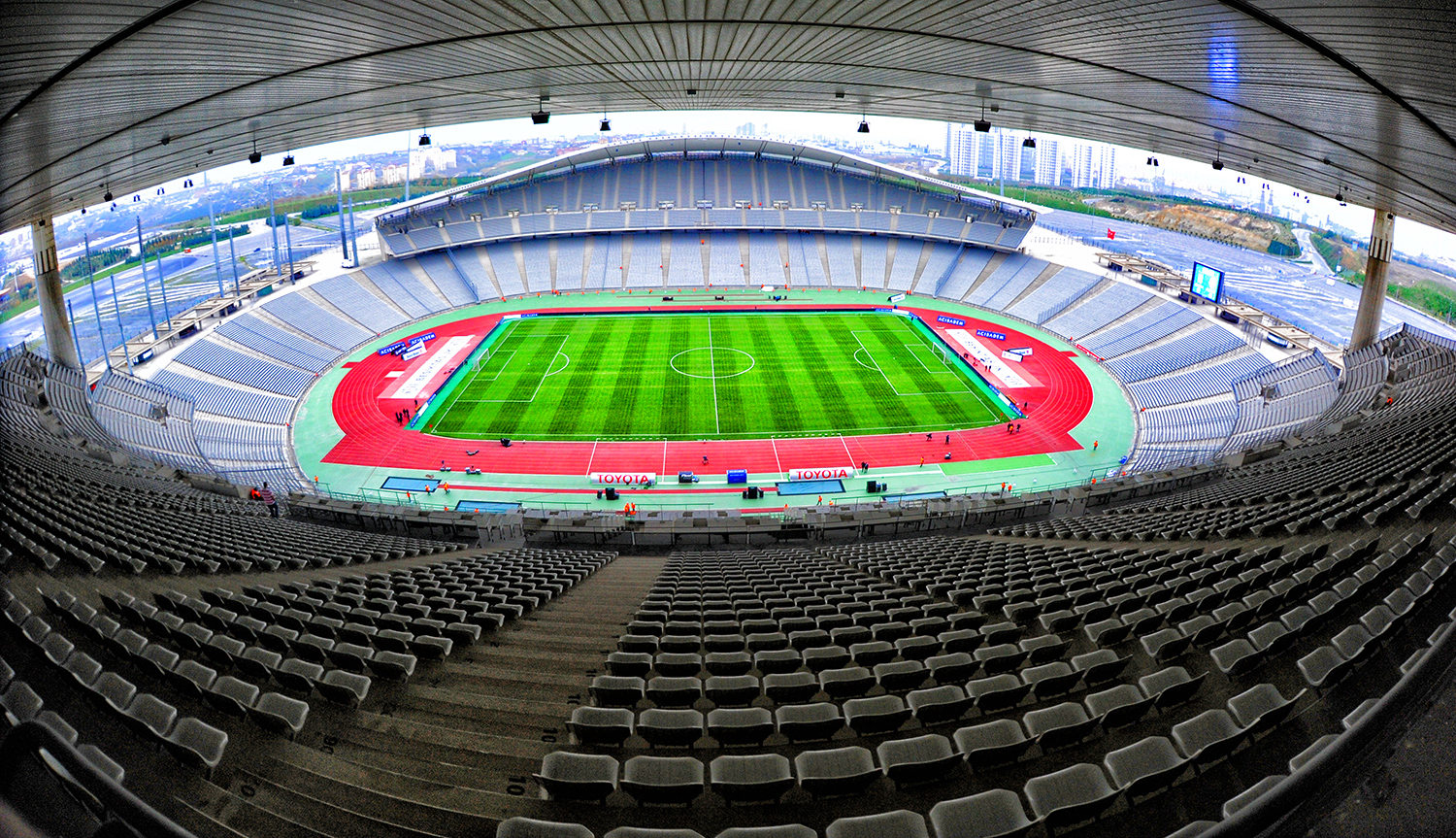
- Atatürk Olympic Stadium hosted the final
- Event: 2023–24 Turkish Cup
Beşiktaş	Trabzonspor
3	2
- Date: 23 May 2024
- Venue: Atatürk Olympic Stadium, Istanbul
- Man of the Match: Salih Uçan (Beşiktaş)
- Referee: Ali Şansalan

The 2024 Turkish Cup final was the decisive match of the 2023–24 Turkish Cup, the 62nd edition of Turkey's primary football cup competition organized by the Turkish Football Federation (TFF). The final was played on 23 May 2024 at Atatürk Olympic Stadium, and featured Beşiktaş and Trabzonspor.

The winner of the match secured a place in the play-off round of the 2024–25 UEFA Europa League play-off round and also qualified for the 2024 Turkish Super Cup.

Beşiktaş won the match 3-2 for their 11th title, and first title since 2020-21 Turkish Cup.

== Match ==
=== Details ===
23 May 2024
20:45 TRT

Beşiktaş	3 - 2	Trabzonspor
Rachid Ghezzal 45+3' (pen.); Salih Uçan 54'; Al-Musrati 90+4'	Report	13' Paul Onuachu; 89' Nicolas Pépé

Atatürk Olympic Stadium
Attendance: 74.772
Referee: Ali Şansalan

Beşiktaş	Trabzonspor

BEŞİKTAŞ:
GK	34	(Turkey) Mert Günok
DF	2	(Norway) Jonas Svensson	(yellow card) 79'
DF	6	(The Gambia) Omar Colley
DF	20	(Turkey) Necip Uysal	(substituted off) 90+7'
DF	26	(Democratic Republic of the Congo) Arthur Masuaku
MF	28	(Libya) Al-Musrati	90+4' (yellow card) 90+5'
MF	8	(Turkey) Salih Uçan	54'
MF	83	(Portugal) Gedson Fernandes
MF	18	(Algeria) Rachid Ghezzal	(penalty scored) (substituted off) 64'
MF	23	(Albania) Ernest Muçi	(substituted off) 90+7'
FW	40	(Democratic Republic of the Congo) Jackson Muleka	(substituted off) 75'
Reserves:
GK	1	(Turkey) Ersin Destanoğlu
DF	4	(Turkey) Onur Bulut
DF	17	(England) Joe Worrall	(substituted on) 90+7'
MF	15	(England) Alex Oxlade-Chamberlain
MF	11	(Kosovo) Milot Rashica	(substituted on) 64'
MF	21	(Turkey) Demir Ege Tıknaz
MF	22	(Kazakhstan) Bakhtiyar Zaynutdinov
FW	9	(Turkey) Cenk Tosun
FW	10	(Cameroon) Vincent Aboubakar	(substituted on) 75'
FW	90	(Turkey) Semih Kılıçsoy	(substituted on) 90+7'
Manager:
(Turkey) Serdar Topraktepe

350px

TRABZONSPOR:
GK	1	(Turkey) Uğurcan Çakır
DF	12	(Belgium) Thomas Meunier	(yellow card) 52'
DF	6	(France) Batista Mendy
DF	24	(Suriname) Stefano Denswil
DF	18	(Turkey) Eren Elmalı
MF	5	(Turkey) Berat Özdemir	(substituted off) 68'
MF	23	(Turkey) Umut Güneş	(substituted off) 83'
MF	7	(Bosnia and Herzegovina) Edin Višća
MF	8	(North Macedonia) Enis Bardhi	(yellow card) 83'
MF	14	(Greece) Taxiarchis Fountas	(substituted off) 55'
FW	30	(Nigeria) Paul Onuachu	13'
Reserves:
GK	54	(Turkey) Muhammet Taha Tepe
DF	2	(Italy) Rayyan Baniya
DF	3	(Spain) Joaquín Fernández
DF	73	(Turkey) Arif Boşluk
MF	10	(Egypt) Trézéguet	(substituted on) 55'
MF	16	(Turkey) Kerem Şen
MF	50	(Turkey) Mehmet Can Aydın
FW	9	(Turkey) Umut Bozok	(substituted on) 83'
FW	19	(Ivory Coast) Nicolas Pépé	(substituted on) 68' (goal) 89'
FW	99	(Croatia) Mislav Oršić
Manager:
(Turkey) Abdullah Avcı
