= Serbay Yağız =

Turkish footballer

Serbay Yagiz
Personal information
- Full name: Serbay Yagiz
- Date of birth: 19 August 1991 (age 35)
- Place of birth: Imranli, Turkey
- Position: Winger

Team information
- Current team: Kahramanmaraşspor

Youth career
- CLK Spor

Senior career*
Years	Team	Apps	(Gls)
2010–2013	Konyaspor	32	(1)
2012–2013	→ Konya Şeker (loan)	19	(3)
2013–2015	Hatayspor	18	(2)
2014	→ İskenderunspor (loan)	4	(0)
2015–2016	Tokatspor	46	(8)
2016–2017	Bugsaşspor	8	(0)
2017–	Kahramanmaraşspor	1	(0)
- * Club domestic league appearances and goals as of 1 October 2015

Serbay Yagiz (born 19 August 1991) is a Turkish professional footballer who plays as a winger for Kahramanmaraşspor.
