= Ali Ceylan =

German footballer

Personal information
- Date of birth: 17 June 1998 (age 28)
- Place of birth: Cologne, Germany
- Height: 1.69 m (5 ft 7 in)
- Position: Left winger

Team information
- Current team: Fethiyespor
- Number: 80

Youth career
- SV Bergisch Gladbach 09
- –2015: Viktoria Köln
- 2016: Rot-Weiß Erfurt
- 2016–2017: Fortuna Köln

Senior career*
Years	Team	Apps	(Gls)
2017–2020	Fortuna Köln	24	(0)
2020	Wuppertaler SV	3	(0)
2020–2022	Rot-Weiß Koblenz	38	(1)
2022–	Fethiyespor	51	(5)
- * Club domestic league appearances and goals as of 02:52, 4 July 2024 (UTC)

Ali Ceylan (born 17 June 1998) is a German footballer who plays as a left winger for Turkish club Fethiyespor.

== Career ==
Ceylan started playing football at SV Bergisch Gladbach 09 before moving to Viktoria Köln in his hometown. He played there until 2015 in the youth classes up to the U19, before moving to the U19 of Rot-Weiß Erfurt in January 2016.

After only half a year he went back to Cologne to the U19 of Fortuna Köln. In summer 2017 he received his first professional contract from the club, after he had ascended to the Bundesliga with the clubs A-Juniors. He made his professional debut in the 3. Liga with a substitution on match day 2 of the 2017–18 season against Carl Zeiss Jena.

In January 2019, Ceylan moved to league competitor Wuppertaler SV. On 17 July 2020, he signed with TuS Rot-Weiß Koblenz.
