= Ahmet Demirli =

Turkish football player

Personal information
- Full name: Ahmet Hakan Demirli
- Date of birth: 7 August 2000 (age 26)
- Place of birth: Üsküdar, Turkey
- Height: 1.82 m (6 ft 0 in)
- Position: Forward

Team information
- Current team: Kepezspor
- Number: 7

Youth career
- 2011–2012: Çamlıcaspor
- 2012–2018: Kartalspor
- 2018–2020: Kasımpaşa

Senior career*
Years	Team	Apps	(Gls)
2020–2023	Kasımpaşa	2	(0)
2020–2021	→ Zonguldak Kömürspor (loan)	27	(1)
2021	→ Belediye Derincespor (loan)	5	(0)
2022	→ Osmaniyespor FK (loan)	17	(1)
2022	→ Artvin Hopaspor (loan)	14	(0)
2023	→ Somaspor (loan)	12	(1)
2023–2024	Somaspor	29	(1)
2024–	Kepezspor	36	(1)
- * Club domestic league appearances and goals as of 8 November 2025

Ahmet Hakan Demirli (born 7 August 2000) is a Turkish football player who plays as a forward for TFF 2. Lig club Kepezspor.

== Professional career ==
Demirli made his professional debut with Kasımpaşa in a 3-1 Turkish Cup loss to Alanyaspor on 15 January 2020.
