= Anil Gözütok =

German footballer

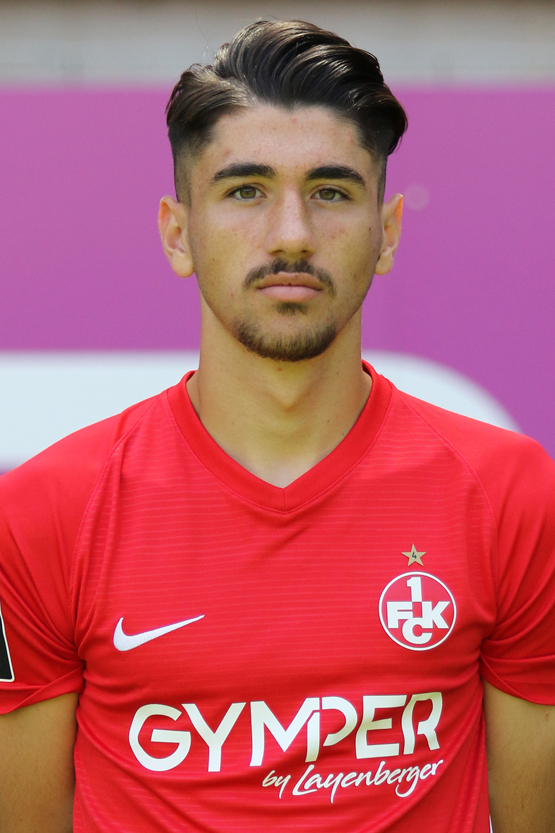
- Gözütok in 2019

Personal information
- Date of birth: 27 October 2000 (age 26)
- Place of birth: Tübingen, Germany
- Height: 1.78 m (5 ft 10 in)
- Position: Midfielder

Team information
- Current team: Karaman
- Number: 19

Youth career
- –2014: SSV Reutlingen
- 2014–2019: 1. FC Kaiserslautern

Senior career*
Years	Team	Apps	(Gls)
2019–2022	1. FC Kaiserslautern II	30	(7)
2020–2022	1. FC Kaiserslautern	12	(0)
2022–2023	Wormatia Worms	27	(0)
2023–2024	Afjet Afyonspor	12	(0)
2024–	Karaman	11	(1)
- * Club domestic league appearances and goals as of 01:17, 4 July 2024 (UTC)

Anil Gözütok (born 27 October 2000) is a German professional footballer who plays as a midfielder for TFF Second League club Karaman.
