= Mahsun Çapkan =

Turkish footballer

Personal information
- Date of birth: 8 October 1999 (age 27)
- Place of birth: Güngören, Turkey
- Height: 1.75 m (5 ft 9 in)
- Position: Winger

Team information
- Current team: Muğlaspor
- Number: 10

Youth career
- 2008–2010: Yavuzselim
- 2010–2018: Fenerbahçe

Senior career*
Years	Team	Apps	(Gls)
2018–2019	Fenerbahçe	0	(0)
2019–2023	Çaykur Rizespor	1	(0)
2019–2020	→ Eyüpspor (loan)	18	(0)
2020–2021	→ Serik Belediyespor (loan)	28	(1)
2021–2022	→ Iğdır (loan)	18	(3)
2022	→ Çorum (loan)	15	(0)
2022–2023	→ Batman Petrolspor (loan)	31	(2)
2023–2024	Muş 1984 Muşspor	23	(1)
2024–2025	Çorluspor 1947	29	(8)
2025–	Muğlaspor	11	(0)

International career^{‡}
2012	Turkey U14	2	(1)
2014	Turkey U15	4	(0)
2014–2015	Turkey U16	12	(1)
2015	Turkey U17	7	(0)
2016	Turkey U18	2	(0)
- * Club domestic league appearances and goals as of 3 October 2021 ‡ National team caps and goals as of 30 November 2025

Mahsun Çapkan (born 8 October 1999) is a Turkish professional footballer who plays as a winger for TFF 2. Lig club Muğlaspor.

== Professional career ==
Çapkan made his debut for Fenerbahçe in a 1–0 Europa League loss to FC Spartak Trnava on 13 December 2018.
