= Rüştü Hanlı =

Turkish footballer

Personal information
- Date of birth: 3 January 1997 (age 29)
- Place of birth: Osmangazi, Turkey
- Height: 1.84 m (6 ft 0 in)
- Positions: Left-back; centre-back

Team information
- Current team: Bursa Yıldırımspor
- Number: 16

Youth career
- 2007–2010: Yeşil Bursa A.Ş
- 2010–2017: Bursaspor

Senior career*
Years	Team	Apps	(Gls)
2017–2020	Bursaspor	9	(0)
2018	→ Adana Demirspor (loan)	0	(0)
2019	→ Elazığspor (loan)	2	(0)
2020–2021	Vanspor	23	(0)
2021–2022	Adanaspor	12	(0)
2022	→ 24 Erzincanspor (loan)	7	(0)
2022–2023	Adıyaman FK	9	(0)
2023–	Bursa Yıldırımspor	2	(0)

International career^{‡}
2013	Turkey U16	3	(0)
2017–2018	Turkey U21	3	(0)
- * Club domestic league appearances and goals as of 1 October 2023 ‡ National team caps and goals as of 30 March 2018

Rüştü Hanlı (born 3 January 1997) is a Turkish footballer who plays as a left-back and centre-back for TFF Third League club Bursa Yıldırımspor.

== Career ==
A youth academy product of Bursaspor, Hanlı made his professional debut with Busaspor in a 4-0 win over Antalyaspor on 29 October 2017.

On the last day of the January 2019 transfer market, Hanlı was one of 22 players on two hours, that signed for Turkish club Elazığspor. had been placed under a transfer embargo but managed to negotiate it with the Turkish FA, leading to them going on a mad spree of signing and registering a load of players despite not even having a permanent manager in place. In just two hours, they managed to snap up a record 22 players - 12 coming in on permanent contracts and a further 10 joining on loan deals until the end of the season. Hanlı was only loaned out to the club for the rest of the season.
