= Halil İbrahim Sönmez =

Turkish footballer

Personal information
- Date of birth: 1 October 1990 (age 36)
- Place of birth: Yomra, Turkey
- Height: 1.77 m (5 ft 9 1/2 in)
- Position: Winger

Team information
- Current team: Elazığspor
- Number: 61

Youth career
- 2002–2003: Trabzonspor
- 2004–2006: Hekimoğlu Doğanspor
- 2008: Trabzon İdmanocağı
- 2008–2009: Trabzon Yolspor
- 2009–2010: Çaykaraspor

Senior career*
Years	Team	Apps	(Gls)
2011–2012	Orhangazispor	6	(0)
2011–2013	Gebzespor	42	(7)
2013	Ünyespor	15	(4)
2013–2014	Sandıklıspor	16	(7)
2014–2018	Konyaspor	38	(2)
2014	→ Anadolu Selçukspor (loan)	31	(16)
2017	→ Çaykur Rizespor (loan)	5	(0)
2018–2019	İstanbulspor	11	(2)
2019–2020	Menemenspor	7	(1)
2020	Bandırmaspor	5	(1)
2020–2021	Amed SK	30	(6)
2021–2022	Çorum	35	(15)
2022–2025	Iğdır	77	(30)
2025–	Elazığspor	26	(10)
- * Club domestic league appearances and goals as of 30 November 2025

Halil İbrahim Sönmez (born 1 October 1990) is a Turkish professional footballer who plays as a winger for TFF 2. Lig club Elazığspor.

== Career ==
In 2015-16 season, Sönmez clocked in at 35 km/h against Akhisar Belediyespor in the match's 83rd minute with 70 meters run. He became one of top 10 fastest footballers in the world, behind Arjen Robben at 37 km/h and Gareth Bale at 36.9 km/h.
