= Kemal Kaynaş Stadium =

Multi-purpose stadium in Karaman, Turkey

Coordinates: 37°11′30″N 33°13′13″E

Kemal Kaynaş Stadyum
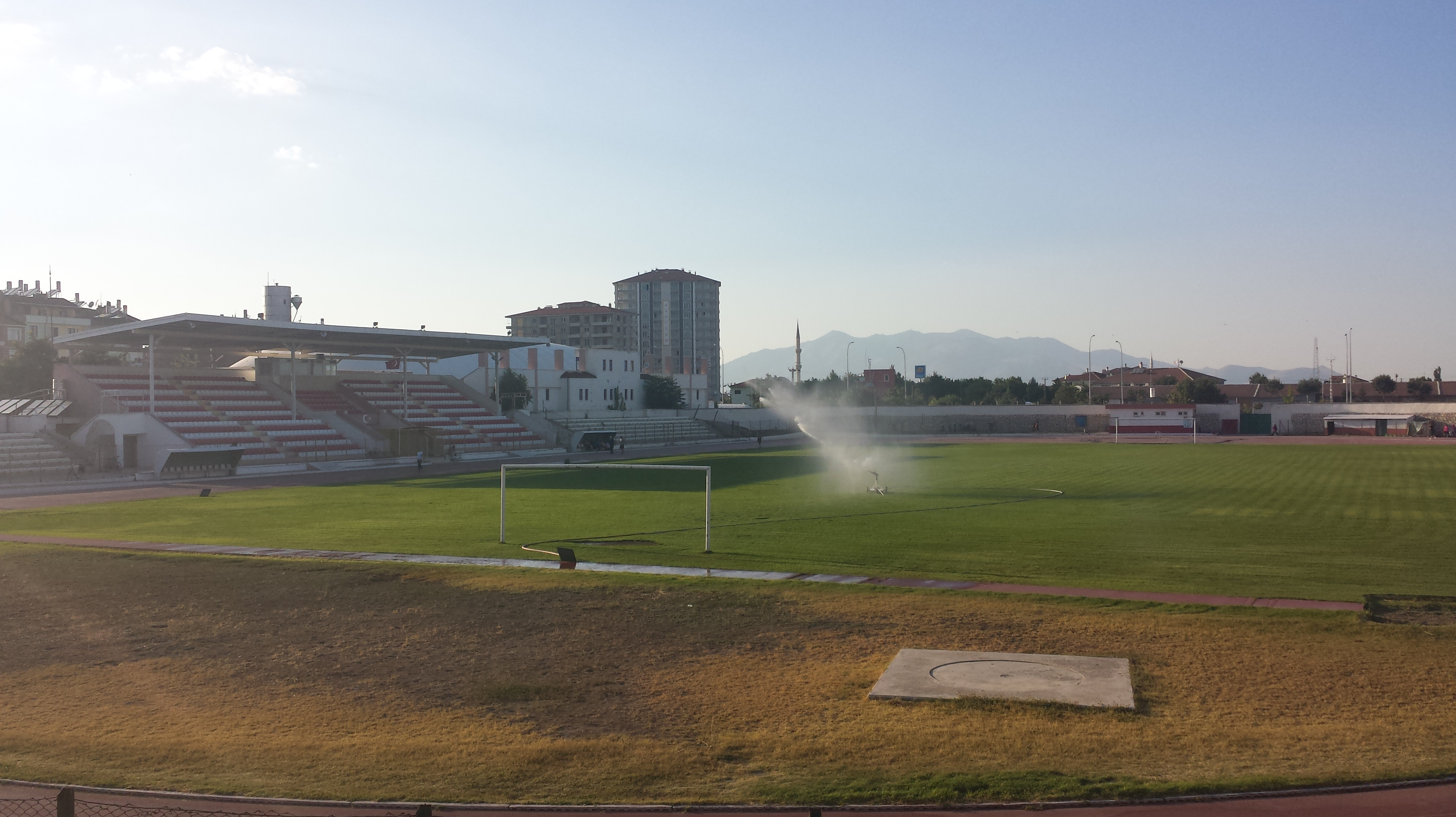
- Interactive map of Kemal Kaynaş Stadyum
- Location: Karaman, Turkey
- Capacity: 2.256
- Surface: Grass

Construction
- Opened: 1969

Tenant
- Karaman FK

Kemal Kaynaş Stadium (Turkish: Kemal Kaynaş Stadyumu) is a multi-purpose stadium in Karaman, Turkey. It is currently used mostly for football matches and is the home ground of Karaman FK. The stadium currently holds 2,256.
