= Alaattin Öner =

Turkish footballer

Personal information
- Date of birth: 30 March 2004 (age 22)
- Place of birth: Denizli, Turkey
- Position: Midfielder

Team information
- Current team: Denizlispor
- Number: 37

Youth career
- 2014–2015: Denizlispor
- 2015–2017: Altınordu
- 2017–2018: Denizli Merkezspor
- 2018–2021: Denizlispor

Senior career*
Years	Team	Apps	(Gls)
2021–	Denizlispor	5	(0)
- * Club domestic league appearances and goals as of 12 June 2023

Alaattin Öner (born 30 March 2004) is a Turkish professional footballer who plays as a midfielder for Denizlispor.

== Professional career ==
Yıldırım is a youth product of Denizlispor, Altınordu, and Denizli Merkezspor. He was the captain of various of the Denizlispor youth sides. He made his professional debut with Denizlispor in a 5–1 Süper Lig loss to Fatih Karagümrük on 15 March 2021.
