= Ramazan Keskin =

Turkish footballer

Personal information
- Date of birth: 4 January 1999 (age 27)
- Place of birth: Alaçam, Turkey
- Position: Midfielder

Team information
- Current team: Kastamonuspor 1966

Youth career
- 2010–2011: Bursa Güven
- 2011–2018: Bursaspor

Senior career*
Years	Team	Apps	(Gls)
2018–2022	Bursaspor	45	(3)
2022–	Kastamonuspor 1966	6	(0)

International career^{‡}
2015–2016	Turkey U17	5	(0)
2017–2018	Turkey U19	8	(0)
- * Club domestic league appearances and goals as of 30 October 2022 ‡ National team caps and goals as of 7 October 2018

Ramazan Keskin (born 4 January 1999) is a Turkish professional footballer who plays as a midfielder for TFF Second League club Kastamonuspor 1966.

== Professional career ==
Keskin made his professional debut with Bursaspor in a 1–0 Süper Lig win over MKE Ankaragücü on 6 October 2018, and assisted the game-winning goal.
