= Emirhan Kaşcıoğlu =

Turkish footballer

Personal information
- Date of birth: 1 January 2001 (age 25)
- Place of birth: Karayazı, Turkey
- Position: Defender

Team information
- Current team: Denizlispor
- Number: 5

Youth career
- 2014–2020: Denizlispor

Senior career*
Years	Team	Apps	(Gls)
2020–	Denizlispor	5	(0)
2021–2022	→ Başkent Gözgözler Akademi	24	(0)
- * Club domestic league appearances and goals as of 15:54, 9 May 2023 (UTC)

Emirhan Kaşcıoğlu (born 1 January 2001) is a Turkish professional footballer who plays as a defender for Denizlispor.

== Professional career ==
Kaşcıoğlu is a youth product of Denizlispor since 2014, and signed his first professional contract on 3 October 2020. He made his professional debut with Denizlispor in a 1–0 Süper Lig loss to Hatayspor on 8 May 2020.
