= 2021–22 Denizlispor season =

Denizlispor
2021–22 season
- Chairman: Mehmet Uz
- Manager: Serhat Gülpınar (until 6 November 2021); Fatih Tekke (from 17 November 2021 to 24 January 2022); Mesut Bakkal (from 26 January 2022)
- Stadium: Denizli Atatürk Stadium
- TFF First League: 11th
- Turkish Cup: Round of 16
- Top goalscorer: League: Ömer Şişmanoğlu (13); All: Ömer Şişmanoğlu (14)

The 2021–22 season was the 55th season of Denizlispor in existence and the club's first season back in the TFF First League, after being relegated from the Turkish first division Süper Lig previous season, finishing in last place. In addition to the domestic league, Denizlispor participated in this season's edition of the Turkish Cup. The season covers the period from July 2021 to 30 June 2022.

== Transfers ==
In	Transfer fee	From
Summer
(Turkey) Murathan Sütcü	End of loan	(Turkey) Kızılcabölükspor
(Turkey) Mert Sarıkuş	End of loan	(Turkey) Vanspor
(Turkey) Alihan Kalkan	End of loan	(Turkey) Sancaktepe
(Turkey) Kadir Kurt	End of loan	(Turkey) Kızılcabölükspor
(Turkey) Emre Sağlık	End of loan	(Turkey) Kızılcabölükspor
(Turkey) Muhammed Gönülaçar	Free	(Turkey) Tuzlaspor
(Turkey) Okan Derici	Free	(Turkey) Ümraniyespor
(Turkey) Gökhan Süzen	Free	(Turkey) Ümraniyespor
(Poland) Adam Stachowiak	Free	(Turkey) Altay
(Nigeria) Ogenyi Onazi	Free	(Lithuania) Žalgiris
(Turkey) Muğdat Çelik	Free	(Turkey) Kayserispor
(Turkey) Asım Hamzaçebi	Free	(Turkey) Tarsus İdman Yurdu
(Turkey) Bünyamin Balat	Loan	(Turkey) Adana Demirspor
(Turkey) Erdal Akdarı	Free	(Turkey) Eskişehirspor
(France) Léo Schwechlen	Free	(Turkey) BB Erzurumspor
(Turkey) Mustafa Çeçenoğlu	Free	(Turkey) Gençlerbirliği
(Netherlands) Brahim Darri	Free	(Turkey) Samsunspor
(Morocco) Ismaïl Aissati	Free	(Turkey) Adana Demirspor
(Turkey) Hakan Çinemre	Free	(Turkey) Adanaspor
(Turkey) Ömer Şişmanoğlu	Free	(Turkey) Tuzlaspor
(Turkey) İlhan Depe	Free	(Turkey) Altay
(Gabon) Kévin Mayi	Free	(Turkey) Ümraniyespor
(Ivory Coast) Brice Dja Djédjé	Free	(Turkey) Samsunspor
(Turkey) Turaç Böke	Free	(Turkey) Çankaya FK
Winter
(Portugal) Tiago Lopes	Free	

Total spending: ▼

Out	Transfer fee	To
Summer
(Tunisia) Ayman Ben Mohamed	End of loan	(France) Le Havre
(Bosnia and Herzegovina) Muris Mešanović	End of loan	(Czech Republic) Mladá Boleslav
(Turkey) Ali Yavuz Kol	End of loan	(Turkey) Galatasaray
(Poland) Radosław Murawski	Free	(Poland) Lech Poznań
(Germany) Marvin Bakalorz	Free	(Germany) MSV Duisburg
(Turkey) Kubilay Aktaş	Free	(Turkey) Manisa
(United States) Mix Diskerud	Free	(Cyprus) Omonia
(Turkey) Özgür Çek	Free	(Turkey) Manisa
(Colombia) Hugo Rodallega	Free	(Brazil) Bahia
(Turkey) Sakıb Aytaç	Free	(Turkey) Kasımpaşa
(Turkey) Hasan Ayaroğlu	Free	(Turkey) Bursaspor
(Turkey) Mustafa Yumlu	Free	(Turkey) BB Erzurumspor
(Brazil) Fabiano	Free	(Greece) Aris
(Turkey) Recep Niyaz	Free	(Turkey) Gaziantep
(Chile) Ángelo Sagal	Free	(Turkey) Gaziantep
(Togo) Mathieu Dossevi	Free	(France) Amiens
(Iraq) Ahmed Yasin	Free	(Sweden) Örebro
(Mali) Hadi Sacko	Free	(Romania) CFR Cluj
(Turkey) Cenk Gönen	Free	(Turkey) Kayserispor
(Turkey) Kadir Kurt	Loan	(Turkey) Fethiyespor
(Portugal) Tiago Lopes	Free	
(Turkey) Görkem Can	Free	
(Turkey) Ferhat Erdoğan	Free	
Winter
(Kosovo) Veton Tusha	Free	(Poland) Termalica
(Turkey) Murathan Sütcü	Loan	(Turkey) Kızılcabölükspor
(Turkey) Alihan Kalkan	Loan	(Turkey) Siirt İl Özel İdarespor
(Turkey) Asım Aksungur	Loan	(Turkey) Başkent Gözgözler Akademi
(Turkey) Emre Yıldırım	Loan	(Turkey) Büyükçekmece Tepecikspor
(Nigeria) Ogenyi Onazi	Free	(Saudi Arabia) Al-Adalah

Total income: ▲

== Squad ==
Note: Flags indicate national team as defined under FIFA eligibility rules; some limited exceptions apply. Players may hold more than one non-FIFA nationality.

No.	Pos.	Nation	Player
1	GK	TUR	Hüseyin Altıntaş
2	DF	POR	Tiago Lopes
3	DF	TUR	Hakan Çinemre
5	DF	TUR	Asım Hamzaçebi
9	MF	TUR	Mustafa Çeçenoğlu
10	DF	TUR	Özer Özdemir
11	MF	TUR	Okan Derici
14	MF	TUR	Turaç Böke
15	DF	TUR	Oğuz Yılmaz (Captain)
19	DF	TUR	Erdal Akdarı
20	GK	TUR	Abdülkadir Sünger
21	MF	MAR	Ismaïl Aissati
22	DF	FRA	Léo Schwechlen
23	MF	TUR	Bünyamin Balat
26	DF	TUR	Gökhan Süzen
27	DF	TUR	Emre Sağlık

No.	Pos.	Nation	Player
29	MF	TUR	İlhan Depe
30	MF	NED	Brahim Darri
33	GK	POL	Adam Stachowiak
35	MF	TUR	Mehmet Ali Ulaman
37	MF	TUR	Alaattin Öner
41	DF	TUR	Muhammet Özkal
63	MF	TUR	Muhammed Gönülaçar
66	MF	TUR	Ferhat Erdoğan
69	FW	GAB	Kévin Mayi
72	MF	TUR	Mert Sarıkuş
76	DF	TUR	Burak Gümüştaş
77	FW	TUR	Ömer Şişmanoğlu
94	MF	TUR	Eren Kıryolcu
97	MF	CIV	Brice Dja Djédjé
99	FW	TUR	Muğdat Çelik

== Competitions ==
=== Overall record ===
Competition	First match	Last match	Starting round	Final position	Record							
Competition	First match	Last match	Starting round	Final position	Pld	W	D	L	GF	GA	GD	Win %
TFF First League	14 August 2021	20 May 2022	Matchday 1	11th	36	14	7	15	46	50	−4	38.89
Turkish Cup	27 October 2021	9 February 2022	Third round	Round of 16	4	1	2	1	8	6	+2	25.00
Total					40	15	9	16	54	56	−2	37.50

Source: Soccerway

=== TFF First League ===
==== League table ====
Pos	Team	Pld	W	D	L	GF	GA	GD	Pts
9	Manisa	36	14	7	15	45	44	+1	49 (Note: Head-to-head points: Manisa 12, Tuzlaspor 6, Denizlispor 0.)
10	Tuzlaspor	36	13	10	13	45	44	+1	49
11	Denizlispor	36	14	7	15	46	50	−4	49
12	Ankara Keçiörengücü	36	13	9	14	45	47	−2	48
13	Gençlerbirliği	36	14	6	16	44	54	−10	48

Source: TFF
Rules for classification: 1) Points; 2) Head-to-head points; 3) Head-to-head goal difference; 4) Head-to-head goals scored; 5) Goal difference; 6) Goals scored

==== Results summary ====
Overall								Home						Away					
Pld	W	D	L	GF	GA	GD	Pts	W	D	L	GF	GA	GD	W	D	L	GF	GA	GD
36	14	7	15	46	50	−4	49	9	2	7	29	27	+2	5	5	8	17	23	−6

Source: TFF.org

==== Results by round ====
Round	1	2	3	4	5	6	7	8	9	10	11	12	13	14	15	16	17	18	19	20	21	22	23	24	25	26	27	28	29	30	31	32	33	34	35	36	37	38
Ground	H	A	H	A	H	A	H	A	H		H	A	H	A	H	A	A	H	A	A	H	A	H	A	H	A	H	A		A	H	A	H	A	H	H	A	H
Result	L	L	L	W	W	L	L	D	W	B	D	L	W	D	L	L	D	L	L	W	L	L	D	D	W	L	D	D	B	W	D	W	W	L	W	W	D	W
Position	18	19	19	16	11	15	16	15	12	14	14	14	12	14	16	17	17	18	18	18	18	18	18	18	17	17	16	16	17	16	16	15	12	15	12	12	13	11

Source: TFF.org
A = Away; H = Home; B = Bye; W = Win; D = Draw; L = Loss

==== Matches ====
Win Draw Loss

14 August 2021 1	Denizlispor	0–2	Bandırmaspor	Denizli
21:45 TRT (UTC+3)	Uslu (yellow card) 12'; Can (yellow card) 62'	Report	Süleyman 29'; Ayçiçek 39'; Davas (yellow card) 51'; Cavlan (yellow card) 67'	Stadium: Atatürk Stadium; Referee: Direnç Tonusluoğlu

22 August 2021 2	Manisa	1–0	Denizlispor	Manisa
21:45 TRT (UTC+3)	Kouter (yellow card) 33'; Çalışkan 79' (pen.); Tetik (yellow card) 81'	Report	Uslu (yellow card) 78'; Kıryolcu (yellow card) 89'	Stadium: Mümin Özkasap Stadium; Referee: Yiğit Arslan

29 August 2021 3	Denizlispor	0–3	MKE Ankaragücü	Denizli
21:45 TRT (UTC+3)	Özdemir (yellow card) 35'; Onazi (yellow card) 67'; Akdarı (red card) 75'; Gönülaçar (yellow card) 76'	Report	Abdioğlu 10'; Güneren 20', 45+2'; Ekinci (red card) 40'; Pinto (yellow card) 64'; Özgenç (yellow card) 76'	Stadium: Atatürk Stadium; Referee: Abdullah Buğra Taşkınsoy

11 September 2021 4	Eyüpspor	0–2	Denizlispor	Istanbul
17:00 TRT (UTC+3)	Bulut (yellow card) 42'; Yılmaz (yellow card) 70'; Kılınç (yellow card) 86'	Report	Şişmanoğlu 57'; Yılmaz (yellow card) 70'; Gönülaçar (yellow card) 90+1'; Çelik 90+6' (pen.)	Stadium: Eyüp Stadium; Referee: Kadir Sağlam

15 September 2021 5	Denizlispor	2–0	Adanaspor	Denizli
17:00 TRT (UTC+3)	Şişmanoğlu 32', 35' (yellow card) 64'; Çeçenoğlu (yellow card) 90'; Depe (yellow card) 90+4'	Report	Yüksel (yellow card) 34'; Roche (yellow card) 55'; Bruns (yellow card) 73'; Köse (yellow card) 82'	Stadium: Atatürk Stadium; Referee: Ömer Faruk Turtay

19 September 2021 6	Altınordu	2–1	Denizlispor	İzmir
19:00 TRT (UTC+3)	Arslan (red card) 16'; Yener (yellow card) 28'; Koçak (yellow card) 45'; Özek (yellow card) 45'; Aydın 47'; Dereli 90+5'	Report	Darri (yellow card) 8'; Djédjé 44'	Stadium: Bornova Aziz Kocaoğlu Stadium; Referee: Mert Güzenge

27 September 2021 7	Denizlispor	2–3	Samsunspor	Denizli
20:00 TRT (UTC+3)	Mayi 12'; Aissati (yellow card) 45+1'; Gönülaçar (yellow card) 55'; Çinemre (yellow card) 61'; Yılmaz (yellow card) 69'; Şişmanoğlu 75'; Çelik (yellow card) 78'; Çeçenoğlu (yellow card) 81'	Report	Ülgen (yellow card) 44'; Öztekin 48'; Kılıç 71' (pen.); Okutan 77'; Diomandé (yellow card) 81'; Gönül (yellow card) 87'	Stadium: Atatürk Stadium; Referee: Burak Şeker

3 October 2021 8	Boluspor	0–0	Denizlispor	Bolu
13:30 TRT (UTC+3)	Özer (yellow card) 54'	Report	Şişmanoğlu (yellow card) 54'	Stadium: Bolu Atatürk Stadium; Referee: Oğuzhan Çakır

16 October 2021 9	Denizlispor	2–1	Balıkesirspor	Denizli
16:00 TRT (UTC+3)	Yılmaz (yellow card) 34'; Çelik (yellow card) 34'; Çinemre 76'; Sağlık (yellow card) 77'; Mayi 90+4'; Aissati (yellow card) 90+5'; Çinemre (yellow card) 90+7'	Report	Çolak 9'; Gökçe (yellow card) 38'; İşçiler (yellow card) 57'; Özgen (yellow card) 70'; Bişi (yellow card) 78'; Dursun (yellow card) 90+7'	Stadium: Atatürk Stadium; Referee: Cihan Aydın

10	Bye

31 October 2021 11	Denizlispor	1–1	Kocaelispor	Denizli
19:00 TRT (UTC+3)	Yılmaz 78'; Çelik (yellow card) 90+1'	Report	Ndlovu 5'; Cabezas (yellow card) 69'; Özeren (yellow card) 71'; Turan (yellow card) 72'; Mandjeck (yellow card) 81'	Stadium: Atatürk Stadium; Referee: Davut Dakul Çelik

5 November 2021 12	Tuzlaspor	3–0	Denizlispor	Istanbul
20:00 TRT (UTC+3)	Bardhi 85'; Başaran 87'; Yazar 90+4'	Report	(yellow card) 62' Yılmaz	Stadium: Vefa Stadium; Referee: Turgut Doman

21 November 2021 13	Denizlispor	2–1	Ankara Keçiörengücü	Denizli
16:00 TRT (UTC+3)	Stachowiak (yellow card) 26'; Şişmanoğlu (yellow card) 54'; Derici 63'; Çinemre 85' (yellow card) 86'	Report	Gür 24'; Cinan (yellow card) 84'	Stadium: Atatürk Stadium; Referee: Mustafa Kürşad Filiz

27 November 2021 14	İstanbulspor	1–1	Denizlispor	Istanbul
13:30 TRT (UTC+3)	Uysal (yellow card) 40'; Uzunhan (yellow card) 45+4'; Berber (yellow card) 59'; Kabasakal 68'	Report	Şişmanoğlu (yellow card) 41' (goal) 81'; Gönülaçar (yellow card) 64'; Onazi (yellow card) 90+1'	Stadium: Necmi Kadıoğlu Stadium; Referee: Cihan Aydın

5 December 2021 15	Denizlispor	1–3	Bursaspor	Denizli
19:00 TRT (UTC+3)	Özdemir (yellow card) 21'; Sünger (red card) 37'; Çinemre (yellow card) 38'; Darri 61'	Report	Bruno 35'; Erentürk (yellow card) 38'; Acolatse (yellow card) 38'; Alaskarov 40'; Yüksek (yellow card) 56'; Matavž 59'	Stadium: Atatürk Stadium; Referee: Onur Özütoprak

10 December 2021 16	Gençlerbirliği	1–0	Denizlispor	Ankara
20:00 TRT (UTC+3)	LuaLua (yellow card) 78'; Mert 88'	Report	Süzen (yellow card) 45+6'; Özdemir (yellow card) 90'; Djédjé (yellow card) 90+1'; Çeçenoğlu (yellow card) 90+5'	Stadium: Eryaman Stadium; Referee: Alper Çetin

15 December 2021 17	Menemenspor	0–0	Denizlispor	Menemen, İzmir
19:00 TRT (UTC+3)	Adamu (yellow card) 82'	Report	Süzen (yellow card) 45'	Stadium: Menemen İlçe Stadium; Referee: Oğuzhan Çakır

20 December 2021 18	Denizlispor	0–1	Ümraniyespor	Denizli
20:00 TRT (UTC+3)	Süzen (yellow card) 45+1'	Report	Mršić 21'; Genç (yellow card) 56'; Gürbulak (yellow card) 57'	Stadium: Atatürk Stadium; Referee: Bülent Birincioğlu

26 December 2021 19	BB Erzurumspor	3–1	Denizlispor	Erzurum
13:30 TRT (UTC+3)	Olanare (yellow card) 52' (goal) 60', 64'; Estrela (yellow card) 66'; Karakullukçu 79'	Report	Djédjé (yellow card) 41' (yellow-red card) 41'; Darri 58'; Çeçenoğlu (yellow card) 61'	Stadium: Kazım Karabekir Stadium; Referee: Furkan Aksuoğlu

8 January 2022 20	Bandırmaspor	3–4	Denizlispor	Bandırma, Balıkesir
13:30 TRT (UTC+3)	Çinemre 22' (o.g.); Davas 32'; Avcı 35'; Özcan (yellow card) 64'; Kény (yellow card) 90+3'	Report	Yılmaz 48' (yellow card) 77'; Depe 51' (yellow card) 68'; Özdemir 65' (yellow card) 67'; Yıldırım (yellow card) 71'; Şişmanoğlu (yellow card) 79' (goal) 90+6'	Stadium: 17 Eylül Stadium; Referee: Yiğit Arslan

15 January 2022 21	Denizlispor	0–1	Manisa	Denizli
13:30 TRT (UTC+3)	Gönülaçar (yellow card) 70'; Sağlık (yellow card) 90+2'	Report	Gakpa 22' (pen.); Barış (yellow card) 29'; Çek (yellow card) 54'; Eken (yellow card) 59'; Karaduman (yellow card) 80'; Çetin (yellow card) 84'; Koç (yellow card) 90+2'	Stadium: Atatürk Stadium; Referee: Burak Pakkan

2 January 2022 22	MKE Ankaragücü	2–1	Denizlispor	Ankara
19:00 TRT (UTC+3)	Güneren 58'; Abdioğlu 90+2'	Report	Depe (yellow card) 36'; Çeçenoğlu (yellow card) 59'; Yılmaz 69'; Sünger (yellow card) 90+3'; Schwechlen (yellow card) 90+5'	Stadium: Eryaman Stadium; Referee: Oğuzhan Çakır

5 February 2022 23	Denizlispor	2–2	Eyüpspor	Denizli
19:00 TRT (UTC+3)	Mayi 66'; Böke 73' (yellow card) 90+2'	Report	Dibba 23'; Bulut 36' (yellow card) 52'; Temeltaş (yellow card) 70'	Stadium: Atatürk Stadium; Referee: Burak Şeker

12 February 2022 24	Adanaspor	0–0	Denizlispor	Adana
13:30 TRT (UTC+3)		Report	Sağlık (yellow card) 59'	Stadium: New Adana Stadium; Referee: Yusuf Ziya Gündüz

16 February 2022 25	Denizlispor	1–0	Altınordu	Denizli
20:00 TRT (UTC+3)	Sağlık (yellow card) 35'; Aktaş 58' (o.g.); Gönülaçar (yellow card) 79'	Report		Stadium: Atatürk Stadium; Referee: Erkan Özdamar

20 February 2022 26	Samsunspor	5–0	Denizlispor	Samsun
13:30 TRT (UTC+3)	Tomané 2' (yellow card) 32'; Özkal 24' (o.g.); Fofana 27'; Öztekin 57', 70'	Report	Çeçenoğlu (yellow card) 72'; Çinemre (yellow card) 73'	Stadium: Samsun Stadium; Referee: Hüseyin Göçek

25 February 2022 27	Denizlispor	2–0	Boluspor	Denizli
20:00 TRT (UTC+3)	Özdemir 17'; Sağlık (yellow card) 39'; Şişmanoğlu (yellow card) 45+2' (goal) 58'; Yılmaz (yellow card) 48'; Akdarı (yellow card) 57'	Report	Özyürek (yellow card) 70'	Stadium: Atatürk Stadium; Referee: Suat Arslanboğa

7 March 2022 28	Balıkesirspor	0–1	Denizlispor	Balıkesir
20:00 TRT (UTC+3)	İşeri (yellow card) 41'; Kéthévoama (yellow card) 82'; Özmen (yellow card) 84'	Report	Depe (yellow card) 35'; Schwechlen (yellow card) 43'; Yılmaz (yellow card) 71'; Çinemre 84'; Özer Özdemir (yellow card) 90+5'	Stadium: Balıkesir Atatürk Stadium; Referee: Alper Akarsu

29	Bye

3 April 2022 30	Kocaelispor	1–5	Denizlispor	Kocaeli
13:30 TRT (UTC+3)	Pereira 43'; Demir (yellow card) 67'; Akyüz (yellow card) 76'	Report	Mayi 29', 67'; Sağlık (yellow card) 45'; Çeçenoğlu 50', 68'; Şişmanoğlu 89'; Akdarı (yellow card) 90'	Stadium: Kocaeli Stadium; Referee: Turgut Doman

10 April 2022 31	Denizlispor	2–4	Tuzlaspor	Denizli
16:00 TRT (UTC+3)	Aissati (yellow card) 40'; Çeçenoğlu (yellow card) 40'; Çinemre (yellow card) 60' (goal) 90+3'; Djédjé (yellow card) 76'; Böke 78'	Report	Harris 4' (yellow card) 28' (yellow-red card) 76'; Öztorun (yellow card) 30'; Diack 45'; Yazar 55'; Ezeh 85' (yellow card) 86'	Stadium: Atatürk Stadium; Referee: Adem Cinek

15 April 2022 32	Ankara Keçiörengücü	0–1	Denizlispor	Ankara
14:30 TRT (UTC+3)	Dingil (yellow card) 60'	Report	Schwechlen (yellow card) 45'; Depe 50'; Özdemir (yellow card) 72'	Stadium: Aktepe Stadium; Referee: Onur Özütoprak

19 April 2022 33	Denizlispor	4–3	İstanbulspor	Denizli
16:00 TRT (UTC+3)	Şişmanoğlu 11', 73'; Çinemre (yellow card) 29'; Depe 40'; Özdemir (yellow card) 42'; Lopes 70' (yellow card) 83'	Report	Rroca 28', 39', 44'	Stadium: Atatürk Stadium; Referee: Furkan Aksuoğlu

23 April 2022 34	Bursaspor	1–0	Denizlispor	Bursa
20:30 TRT (UTC+3)	Alaskarov 30' (penalty missed) 55'; (yellow card) 87' Akgün; (yellow card) 90+7' Pedro	Report	Şişmanoğlu (yellow card) 9'; Çinemre (yellow card) 14'; Gönülaçar (yellow card) 22'; Mayi (yellow card) 41'; Aissati (yellow card) 55' (yellow-red card) 77'; Akdarı (yellow card) 84'	Stadium: Bursa Metropolitan Stadium; Referee: Atilla Karaoğlan

1 May 2022 35	Denizlispor	2–1	Gençlerbirliği	Denizli
16:00 TRT (UTC+3)	Süzen (yellow card) 46'; Şişmanoğlu 51'; Gönülaçar (yellow card) 51'; Özdemir (yellow card) 75'; Djédjé 78'	Report	Alıcı 26'; Tshibola (yellow card) 45+1'; Lima (yellow card) 45+1'	Stadium: Atatürk Stadium; Referee: Mert Güzenge

8 May 2022 36	Denizlispor	2–1	Menemenspor	Denizli
16:00 TRT (UTC+3)	Şişmanoğlu 7' (yellow card) 90+8'; Djédjé (yellow card) 28'; Lopes 76'; Böke (yellow card) 82'; Mayi (red card) 90+8'; Aissati (yellow card) 90+8'	Report	Sağat 23'; Çapar (yellow card) 41'; Gomes (yellow card) 45+4'; Kehinde (yellow card) 82'; Cissé (yellow card) 90+8'	Stadium: Atatürk Stadium; Referee: Hüseyin Göçek

14 May 2022 37	Ümraniyespor	0–0	Denizlispor	Istanbul
16:00 TRT (UTC+3)	Eser (yellow card) 19'	Report	Süzen (penalty missed) 19'	Stadium: Ümraniye Belediyesi Şehir Stadium; Referee: Ali Palabıyık

20 May 2022 38	Denizlispor	4–0	BB Erzurumspor	Denizli
20:00 TRT (UTC+3)	Yılmaz 19'; Süzen 25'; Şişmanoğlu 42'; Sünger (yellow card) 82'; Gönülaçar (yellow card) 89'; Derici 90+3'	Report		Stadium: Atatürk Stadium; Referee: Cihan Aydın

=== Turkish Cup ===
27 October 2021 Third round	Denizlispor	1–1 (a.e.t.) (4–3 p)	Şile Yıldızspor	Denizli
14:00 TRT (UTC+3)	Schwechlen (yellow card) 29' (goal) 47'; Sünger (yellow card) 45+2'; Çeçenoğlu (yellow card) 66'; Balat (red card) 66'; Mayi (yellow card) 99'; Şişmanoğlu (yellow card) 99'	Report	Şen (yellow card) 12'; Karaca (yellow card) 43'; Sevindir (penalty scored); Can (yellow card) 79'; Kurt (yellow card) 98'; Yıldız (yellow card) 98'	Stadium: Atatürk Stadium; Referee: Erhan Kutlu
	Penalties
	Aissati (penalty missed); Mayi (penalty scored); Çeçenoğlu (penalty scored); Onazi (penalty scored); Şişmanoğlu (penalty scored)		(penalty scored) Aygüneş; (penalty missed) Eken; (penalty missed) Güngör; (penalty scored) Yıldız; (penalty scored) Kurt

1 December 2021 Fourth round	Denizlispor	3–0	Ağrı 1970	Denizli
14:00 TRT (UTC+3)	Böke 55'; Hamzaçebi 58'; Şişmanoğlu 83'	Report	Morgül (yellow card) 57' (yellow-red card) 60'	Stadium: Atatürk Stadium; Referee: Tarık Güldal

28 December 2021 Fifth round	Galatasaray	3–3 (a.e.t.) (5–6 p)	Denizlispor	Denizli
21:00 TRT (UTC+3)	Öztürk 29' (yellow card) 83' (yellow-red card) 90+5'; Dervişoğlu 49'; Mohamed 50' (yellow card) 50'; Bayram (yellow card) 90+3'	Report	Depe 9'; Akdarı (yellow card) 11'; Darri 38'; Sağlık (yellow card) 49'; Gönülaçar (yellow card) 70'; Hamzaçebi (yellow card) 83'; Nelsson 90+9' (o.g.); Süzen (yellow card) 98'; Böke (yellow card) 105+2'	Stadium: Atatürk Stadium; Referee: Volkan Bayarslan
	Penalties
	Nelsson (penalty scored); Dervişoğlu (penalty scored); Antalyalı (penalty scored); Mohamed (penalty scored); van Aanholt (penalty scored); Çağlayan (penalty missed)		(penalty scored) Süzen; (penalty scored) Gönülaçar; (penalty scored) Çeçenoğlu; (penalty scored) Özdemir; (penalty scored) Sünger; (penalty scored) Schwechlen

9 February 2022 Round of 16	Denizlispor	1–2	Trabzonspor	Denizli
20:30 TRT (UTC+3)	Lopes (yellow card) 13'; Çeçenoğlu 58'; Akdarı (yellow card) 66'	Report	Türkmen 8'; Kaplan (yellow card) 63'; Kouassi 77'; Özdemir (yellow card) 88'	Stadium: Atatürk Stadium; Referee: Alper Ulusoy
