= 2022–23 Denizlispor season =

Denizlispor
2022–23 season
- Chairman: Mehmet Uz
- Manager: Mesut Bakkal (until 24 October 2022); Giray Bulak (from 1 November 2022 to 24 March 2023); Kemal Kılıç (from 26 March 2023 to 10 April 2023); Bülent Ertuğrul (from 10 April 2023)
- Stadium: Denizli Atatürk Stadium
- TFF First League: 18th (relegated)
- Turkish Cup: Fourth round
- Top goalscorer: League: Ömer Şişmanoğlu (8); All: Ömer Şişmanoğlu (8)

The 2022–23 season was the 56th season of Denizlispor in existence and the club's second consecutive season in the TFF First League. In addition to the domestic league, Denizlispor participated in this season's edition of the Turkish Cup. The season covers the period from July 2022 to 30 June 2023.

Denizlispor suffered poor form throughout their season in the relegation zone in 36 of 38 rounds, having a disastrous start to the season with just 6 points in their first 16 fixtures, with 4 different managers in charge during the entire season and were eventually officially relegated on 15 April 2023, following a 4–0 home defeat against Ankara Keçiörengücü.

== Transfers ==
=== In ===
No.	Pos.	Player	Transferred from	Fee	Date	Source
—	DF	(Turkey) Kadir Kurt	(Turkey) Fethiyespor	Loan return	30 June 2022	
—	DF	(Turkey) Murathan Sütcü	(Turkey) Kızılcabölükspor	Loan return	30 June 2022	
—	DF	(Turkey) Emirhan Kaşcıoğlu	(Turkey) Başkent Gözgözler Akademi	Loan return	30 June 2022	
—	MF	(Turkey) Alihan Kalkan	(Turkey) Siirt İl Özel İdarespor	Loan return	30 June 2022	
—	MF	(Turkey) Asım Aksungur	(Turkey) Başkent Gözgözler Akademi	Loan return	30 June 2022	
—	DF	(Turkey) Emre Yıldırım	(Turkey) Büyükçekmece Tepecikspor	Loan return	30 June 2022	

=== Out ===
No.	Pos.	Player	Transferred to	Fee	Date	Source
30	MF	(Netherlands) Brahim Darri	(Turkey) Samsunspor	Loan return	30 June 2022	
23	MF	(Turkey) Bünyamin Balat	(Turkey) Adana Demirspor	Loan return	30 June 2022	
33	GK	(Poland) Adam Stachowiak	Free agent	Free transfer	30 June 2022	
2	DF	(Portugal) Tiago Lopes	Free agent	Free transfer	30 June 2022	
99	FW	(Turkey) Muğdat Çelik	(Turkey) Yeni Mersin İdmanyurdu	Free transfer	27 July 2022	
44	DF	(Turkey) Kadir Kurt	(Turkey) Somaspor	Loan	29 July 2022	
81	DF	(Turkey) Emre Yıldırım	(Turkey) Gümüşhanespor	Loan	17 August 2022	
82	GK	(Turkey) Ertuğrul Bağ	(Turkey) Muş 1984 Muşspor	Loan	28 August 2022	
29	MF	(Turkey) İlhan Depe	(Turkey) Bucaspor 1928	Loan	8 September 2022	
16	MF	(Turkey) Asım Aksungur	(Turkey) Yeşilçınar SK	Loan	29 September 2022	
72	MF	(Turkey) Mert Sarıkuş	(Turkey) Yeşilçınar SK	Loan	29 September 2022	
—	DF	(Turkey) Murathan Sütcü	(Turkey) Sarayköyspor	Loan	29 September 2022	
76	DF	(Turkey) Burak Gümüştaş	(Turkey) Çivril Kıralan Demirspor	Free transfer	30 September 2022	
16	MF	(Turkey) Eren Kıryolcu	(Turkey) Darıca Gençlerbirliği	Loan	30 January 2023	

== Squad ==
As of 29 September 2022

Note: Flags indicate national team as defined under FIFA eligibility rules; some limited exceptions apply. Players may hold more than one non-FIFA nationality.

No.	Pos.	Nation	Player
1	GK	TUR	Hüseyin Altıntaş
4	DF	TUR	Muhammet Özkal
5	DF	TUR	Hakan Çinemre
6	DF	TUR	Asım Hamzaçebi
7	FW	TUR	Ömer Şişmanoğlu
8	DF	TUR	Özer Özdemir
9	FW	GAB	Kévin Mayi
10	MF	TUR	Okan Derici
11	FW	TUR	Mehmet Ali Ulaman
12	FW	TUR	Alihan Kalkan
13	GK	TUR	Ali Eren Yalçın
14	MF	TUR	Bekir Turaç Böke
15	DF	TUR	Oğuz Yılmaz

No.	Pos.	Nation	Player
17	FW	TUR	Deniz Kodal
20	GK	TUR	Abdülkadir Sünger
22	DF	FRA	Léo Schwechlen
23	DF	TUR	Erdal Akdarı
24	DF	TUR	Emirhan Kaşcıoğlu
26	DF	TUR	Gökhan Süzen (Captain)
27	DF	TUR	Emre Sağlık
37	MF	TUR	Alaattin Öner
45	DF	TUR	Ahmet Tekin
66	DF	TUR	Berkant Gündem
72	MF	TUR	Muhammed Gönülaçar
77	MF	TUR	Mustafa Çeçenoğlu
97	MF	CIV	Brice Dja Djédjé

=== Other players under contract ===
Note: Flags indicate national team as defined under FIFA eligibility rules; some limited exceptions apply. Players may hold more than one non-FIFA nationality.

No.	Pos.	Nation	Player
—	MF	MAR	Ismaïl Aissati

== Pre-season and friendlies ==
=== Pre-season ===
31 July 2022 Friendly	Göztepe	2–1	Denizlispor	İzmir
20:00 TRT (UTC+3)	Öztekin 39' (pen.); Özkayımoğlu 71'	Report	Böke 85'	Stadium: Gürsel Aksel Stadium; Attendance: 0

== Competitions ==
=== Overall record ===
Competition	First match	Last match	Starting round	Final position	Record							
Competition	First match	Last match	Starting round	Final position	Pld	W	D	L	GF	GA	GD	Win %
TFF First League	13 August 2022	May 2023	Matchday 1	18th	36	7	5	24	35	67	−32	19.44
Turkish Cup	19 October 2022	10 November 2022	Third round	Fourth round	2	1	0	1	2	6	−4	50.00
Total					38	8	5	25	37	73	−36	21.05

Source: Soccerway

=== TFF First League ===
==== League table ====
Pos	Team	Pld	W	D	L	GF	GA	GD	Pts	Qualification or relegation
15	Gençlerbirliği	36	10	8	18	46	55	−9	38 (Note: Head-to-head points: Gençlerbirliği 1–2 Tuzlaspor, Tuzlaspor 1–0 Gençlerbirliği)	
16	Altınordu (R)	36	9	8	19	41	57	−16	35	Relegation to the TFF Second League
17	Adanaspor (Note: Adanaspor withdrew from the league following the 2023 Turkey–Syria earthquake and were not relegated at the end of the season.)	36	6	7	23	32	76	−44	25	Withdrew
18	Denizlispor (Note: Denizlispor have been deducted 3 points by the Club Licensing Board for failing to meet the licensing requirements.) (R)	36	7	5	24	35	67	−32	23	Relegation to the TFF Second League
19	Yeni Malatyaspor (Note: Yeni Malatyaspor have been deducted 3 points by the Club Licensing Board for failing to meet the licensing requirements. Yeni Malatyaspor withdrew from the league following the 2023 Turkey–Syria earthquake and were not relegated at the end of the season.)	36	4	7	25	22	81	−59	16	Withdrew

Source: TFF
Rules for classification: 1) Points; 2) Head-to-head points; 3) Head-to-head goal difference; 4) Head-to-head goals scored; 5) Goal difference; 6) Goals scored
(R) Relegated

==== Results summary ====
Overall								Home						Away					
Pld	W	D	L	GF	GA	GD	Pts	W	D	L	GF	GA	GD	W	D	L	GF	GA	GD
36	7	5	24	35	67	−32	23	4	4	10	18	25	−7	3	1	14	17	42	−25

Source: TFF.org

==== Results by round ====
Round	1	2	3	4	5	6	7	8	9	10	11	12	13	14	15	16	17	18	19	20	21	22	23	24	25	26	27	28	29	30	31	32	33	34	35	36	37	38
Ground	A	H	A	H	A	H	A	H	A	H	A	H		A	H	A	H	A	H	H	A	H	A	H	A	H	A	H	A	H	A		H	A	H	A	H	A
Result	L	D	L	L	L	D	L	L	L	L	L	W	B	L	D	L	W	W	W	L	L	D	W	L	D	L	L	L	L	L	L	B	L	L	L	L	W	W
Position	15	13	16	17	19	19	19	19	19	19	19	19	19	19	19	19	18	18	17	18	18	19	18	18	17	17	18	18	18	18	18	18	18	18	18	18	18	18

Source: TFF.org
A = Away; H = Home; B = Bye; W = Win; D = Draw; L = Loss

==== Matches ====
Win Draw Loss

13 August 2022 1	Eyüpspor	1–0	Denizlispor	Istanbul
21:45 TRT (UTC+3)	Demirok (yellow card) 34'; Ezeh (yellow card) 60'; Eze 74'; Emir (yellow card) 88'; Yazar (yellow card) 90+6'	Report	Çeçenoğlu (yellow card) 18'; Schwechlen (yellow card) 45+2'	Stadium: Eyüp Stadium; Attendance: 955; Referee: Alper Akarsu

2 August 2022 2	Denizlispor	0–0	Çaykur Rizespor	Denizli
21:00 TRT (UTC+3)	Yılmaz (yellow card) 71'	Report	Yılmaz (yellow card) 34'; Miya (yellow card) 54'; Potuk (yellow card) 77'; Kalafat (yellow card) 88'; Topçu (yellow card) 90+2'; Altıntaş (yellow card) 90+9'; Çetin (yellow card) 90+11'	Stadium: Denizli Atatürk Stadium; Attendance: 3,139; Referee: Kutluhan Bilgiç

27 August 2022 3	Manisa	3–2	Denizlispor	Manisa
17:00 TRT (UTC+3)	Kör 45+2', 46'; Prib 58'	Report	Süzen 18'; Sağlık (yellow card) 76'; Çeçenoğlu 90+8'	Stadium: Mümin Özkasap Stadium; Referee: Caner Ak

4 September 2022 4	Denizlispor	0–1	Bandırmaspor	Denizli
20:00 TRT (UTC+3)	Özdemir (yellow card) 67'	Report	Avcı 61'; Mulumba (yellow card) 67'; Dembélé (yellow card) 90+1'; Ayçiçek (yellow card) 90+5'	Stadium: Denizli Atatürk Stadium; Referee: Mehmet Türkmen

10 September 2022 5	Sakaryaspor	2–1	Denizlispor	Sakarya
20:00 TRT (UTC+3)	Kasongo 53', 71'; Yavuz (yellow card) 59'; Köse (yellow card) 86'; Taşçı (yellow card) 90+1'; Erdoğan (yellow card) 90+12'	Report	Mayi 21'; Gönülaçar (yellow card) 30'; Süzen (yellow card) 59'; Schwechlen (yellow card) 84'; Böke (yellow card) 90+1'; Şişmanoğlu (yellow card) 90+8'; Çeçenoğlu (yellow card) 90+10'	Stadium: New Sakarya Atatürk Stadium; Referee: Ozan Ergün

17 September 2022 6	Denizlispor	2–2	Gençlerbirliği	Denizli
16:00 TRT (UTC+3)	Şişmanoğlu 6'; Çeçenoğlu (yellow card) 12'; Yılmaz 21' (yellow card) 45+2'; Sağlık (yellow card) 87'; Gündem (yellow card) 89'	Report	İlker Karakaş 12' (pen.); Gökhan Gül 53'	Stadium: Denizli Atatürk Stadium; Referee: Tarık Güldal

3 October 2022 7	Erzurumspor	1–0	Denizlispor	Erzurum
20:00 TRT (UTC+3)	Olanare 45+3'	Report	Schwechlen (red card) 10'; Süzen (red card) 45+5'; Gönülaçar (yellow card) 52'	Stadium: Kazım Karabekir Stadium; Referee: Direnç Tonusluoğlu

9 October 2022 8	Denizlispor	0–1	Pendikspor	Denizli
19:00 TRT (UTC+3)	Çinemre (yellow card) 54'; Şişmanoğlu (yellow card) 71'; Sağlık (yellow card) 79'; Gönülaçar (yellow card) 90+4'	Report	Sülüngöz (yellow card) 45+1' (goal) 75'; Keskin (yellow card) 90+4'; Özgenç (yellow card) 90+4'	Stadium: Denizli Atatürk Stadium; Referee: Ömer Faruk Turtay

14 October 2022 9	Boluspor	3–0	Denizlispor	Bolu
20:00 TRT (UTC+3)	Landel 40'; Kayamba (yellow card) 55' (goal) 61'; Baldé 90+1'	Report	Gönülaçar (yellow card) 21'	Stadium: Bolu Atatürk Stadium; Referee: Muhammet Ali Metoğlu

22 October 2022 10	Denizlispor	1–2	Altınordu	Denizli
19:00 TRT (UTC+3)	Sağlık (yellow card) 19'; Böke 88'; Çinemre (yellow card) 90+5'	Report	Esendemir (yellow card) 11'; Özek 35' (pen.), 67'; Sürmeli (yellow card) 38'; Koçak (yellow card) 90+4'	Stadium: Denizli Atatürk Stadium; Referee: Oğuzhan Aksu

29 October 2022 11	Göztepe	5–0	Denizlispor	İzmir
19:00 TRT (UTC+3)	Köybaşı 15', 58'; Mamah 22'; Kvasina 69'; Hasić 83'	Report	Sünger (red card) 54'	Stadium: Gürsel Aksel Stadium; Referee: Abdullah Buğra Taşkınsoy

6 November 2022 12	Denizlispor	4–3	Tuzlaspor	Denizli
13:30 TRT (UTC+3)	Şişmanoğlu 5' (pen.), 30'; Sağlık (yellow card) 18'; Çeçenoğlu (yellow card) 42' (goal) 46', 52'; Süzen (yellow card) 45'; Djédjé (yellow card) 90+3'; Altıntaş (yellow card) 90+5'	Report	Abdoulaye Cissé 8'; Bünyamin Yürür 35'; James Adeniyi 79' (pen.)	Stadium: Denizli Atatürk Stadium; Referee: Adem Cinek

13	Bye

19 November 2022 14	Ankara Keçiörengücü	2–0	Denizlispor	Ankara
13:30 TRT (UTC+3)	Muhammed 38'; Olawoyin (yellow card) 45+2' (goal) 56'; Kartal (yellow card) 61'	Report		Stadium: Aktepe Stadium; Referee: Oğuzhan Çakır

25 November 2022 15	Denizlispor	0–0	Bodrumspor	Denizli
20:00 TRT (UTC+3)	Djédjé (yellow card) 40'	Report		Stadium: Denizli Atatürk Stadium; Referee: Adnan Deniz Kayatepe

3 December 2022 16	Samsunspor	5–0	Denizlispor	Samsun
16:00 TRT (UTC+3)	Laura 25', 37'; Öztürk (yellow card) 59'; Ülgen 62'; Harris 68'; Özbaskıcı (yellow card) 84'; Sağat 90+2'	Report	Özdemir (yellow card) 29'; Schwechlen (yellow card) 32'	Stadium: Samsun Stadium; Attendance: Cihan Aydın

10 December 2022 17	Denizlispor	2–1	Altay	Denizli
16:00 TRT (UTC+3)	Çeçenoğlu (yellow card) 57'; Çinemre (yellow card) 75'; Schwechlen (yellow card) 76'; Özdemir 86', 90'	Report	Erdoğan (yellow card) 14'; Sarıkaya 46' (yellow card) 51'; Gülselam (yellow card) 57'; Tekin (yellow card) 74'	Stadium: Denizli Atatürk Stadium; Referee: Furkan Aksuoğlu

19 December 2022 18	Adanaspor	2–3	Denizlispor	Adana
20:00 TRT (UTC+3)	Türker 19' (yellow card) 65'; Sacko 37'; Güveli (yellow card) 67'; Köse (yellow card) 90+1'; Katipoğlu (yellow card) 90+2'	Report	Yılmaz 3'; Şişmanoğlu 17'; Mayi 38'; Djédjé (yellow card) 45'; Sağlık (yellow card) 89'	Stadium: New Adana Stadium; Referee: Can Cengiz

25 December 2022 19	Denizlispor	3–0	Yeni Malatyaspor	Denizli
16:00 TRT (UTC+3)	Sağlık (yellow card) 16'; Şişmanoğlu 24', 61'; Çinemre 36'	Report		Stadium: Denizli Atatürk Stadium; Referee: Onur Özütoprak

13 January 2023 20	Denizlispor	0–1	Eyüpspor	Denizli
20:00 TRT (UTC+3)	Şişmanoğlu (yellow card) 29'; Gönülaçar (yellow card) 64'; Böke (yellow card) 83'	Report	Çinemre 45+3' (o.g.); Niyaz (yellow card) 57'	Stadium: Denizli Atatürk Stadium; Referee: Reşat Onur Coşkunses

23 January 2023 21	Çaykur Rizespor	3–1	Denizlispor	Rize
20:00 TRT (UTC+3)	Bolasie 4' (pen.); Altıntaş 20'; Olawoyin (yellow card) 79'; Keser 89'	Report	Böke 45+6'; Özkal (yellow card) 62'	Stadium: Yeni Rize Şehir Stadium; Referee: Ali Yılmaz

29 January 2023 22	Denizlispor	1–1	Manisa	Denizli
19:00 TRT (UTC+3)	Çeçenoğlu 17' (pen.); Şişmanoğlu (yellow card) 40'; Schwechlen (yellow card) 90'	Report	Gakpa 27' (pen.) (yellow card) 72'; Diallo (yellow card) 45+2'; Şahin (yellow card) 73'; Domgjoni (yellow card) 80'	Stadium: Denizli Atatürk Stadium; Referee: Yunus Dursun

4 February 2023 23	Bandırmaspor	1–4	Denizlispor	Balıkesir
13:30 TRT (UTC+3)	Šaponjić 66'; Cavlun (yellow card) 90+3'	Report	Yılmaz 64'; Bekir Turaç Böke 78'; Mustafa Çeçenoğlu 79'; Emre Sağlık (yellow card) 89'; Özer Özdemir 90+3'	Stadium: 17 Eylül Stadium; Referee: Ayberk Demirbaş

5 March 2023 24	Denizlispor	0–1	Sakaryaspor	Denizli
19:00 TRT (UTC+3)	Djédjé (yellow card) 12'; Çinemre (yellow card) 88' (yellow-red card) 88'	Report	Akgün (yellow card) 63'; Nalepa (yellow card) 67'; Kasongo 79' (pen.); Uzun (yellow card) 90+3'	Stadium: Denizli Atatürk Stadium; Referee: Abdullah Buğra Taşkınsoy

8 March 2023 25	Gençlerbirliği	0–0	Denizlispor	Ankara
20:00 TRT (UTC+3)	Keskin (yellow card) 90+1'; Güreler (yellow card) 90+4'	Report	Çeçenoğlu (yellow card) 90+4'	Stadium: Eryaman Stadium; Referee: Mehmet Türkmen

12 March 2023 26	Denizlispor	0–2	Erzurumspor	Denizli
19:00 TRT (UTC+3)	Yılmaz (yellow card) 58'	Report	Estrela (yellow card) 19'; Özgür Sert 73'; Eren Tozlu 80'	Stadium: Denizli Atatürk Stadium; Referee: Murat Erdoğan

19 March 2023 27	Pendikspor	2–1	Denizlispor	Istanbul
19:00 TRT (UTC+3)	Regattin 45' (pen.); Tunçer 79'; Akça (yellow card) 87'	Report	Mayi (yellow card) 28'; Gönülaçar (yellow card) 32'; Demirtaş (yellow card) 45+5'; Çeçenoğlu (yellow card) 78'; Özkal (yellow card) 88'; Şişmanoğlu 90+4'	Stadium: Pendik Stadium; Referee: Yasin Kol

24 March 2023 28	Denizlispor	1–2	Boluspor	Denizli
20:00 TRT (UTC+3)	Süzen (yellow card) 39'; Yılmaz 42'; Gönülaçar (yellow card) 63'; Özkal (yellow card) 90+10'	Report	Canlı (yellow card) 53'; Ulaş (yellow card) 55'; Ndlovu 73'; Alsan 90+2'; Yıldız (yellow card) 90+10'	Stadium: Denizli Atatürk Stadium; Referee: Çağdaş Altay

28 March 2023 29	Altınordu	5–2	Denizlispor	İzmir
17:00 TRT (UTC+3)	Sürmeli 12'; Özgün 16', 65', 70'; Yener (yellow card) 83' (goal) 90'	Report	Şişmanoğlu 5'; Derici 43' (yellow card) 87'; Çinemre (yellow card) 79'	Stadium: Bornova Aziz Kocaoğlu Stadium; Referee: Volkan Bayarslan

1 April 2023 30	Denizlispor	0–2	Göztepe	Denizli
13:30 TRT (UTC+3)	Djédjé (yellow card) 19'; Mayi (red card) 90+5'; Akdarı (yellow card) 90+7'	Report	Kayan 39'; Traoré (yellow card) 67'; Mamah 83'; Akgün (yellow card) 90+7'	Stadium: Denizli Atatürk Stadium; Referee: Muhammet Ali Metoğlu

7 April 2023 31	Tuzlaspor	3–0	Denizlispor	Istanbul
16:00 TRT (UTC+3)	Akdağ 34'; Mata (yellow card) 44'; Papaker 59'; Yahaya 69'; Yürür (yellow card) 79'	Report	Schwechlen (yellow card) 75'	Stadium: Sancaktepe Stadium; Referee: Adnan Deniz Kayatepe

32	Bye

15 April 2023 33	Denizlispor	0–4	Ankara Keçiörengücü	Denizli
20:30 TRT (UTC+3)	Çeçenoğlu (yellow card) 16'	Report	Muhammed 17' (pen.), 83' (pen.), (yellow card) 54'; Gür (yellow card) 38'; Dembélé 45+1', (red card) 45+3'; Aktaş 85'	Stadium: Denizli Atatürk Stadium; Referee: Alpaslan Şen

23 April 2023 34	Bodrumspor	1–0	Denizlispor	Muğla
13:30 TRT (UTC+3)	Özmert 31' (pen.); Akbay (yellow card) 72'; Özdamar (yellow card) 87'	Report	Gündüz (yellow card) 89'	Stadium: Bodrum İlçe Stadium; Referee: Erdem Mertoğlu

30 April 2023 35	Denizlispor	1–2	Samsunspor	Denizli
19:00 TRT (UTC+3)	Süzen 86'; Akdarı (yellow card) 87'	Report	Kahraman (yellow card) 26'; Çift (yellow card) 45+5'; Çelik 75', (yellow card) 90+6'; Fofana 82'; Öztürk (yellow card) 85'	Stadium: Denizli Atatürk Stadium; Referee: Emre Kargın

7 May 2023 36	Altay	3–0	Denizlispor	İzmir
16:00 TRT (UTC+3)	Gülselam 7'; Yokuşlu (yellow card) 37'; Paixão 59'; Erdoğan 90'	Report	Kısaoğlu (yellow card) 39'; Sünger (yellow card) 90+5'	Stadium: Alsancak Mustafa Denizli Stadium; Referee: Oğuzhan Aksu

37	Denizlispor	3–0 (w/o)	Adanaspor	Denizli
				Stadium: Denizli Atatürk Stadium
Note: Adanaspor withdrew from the league due to the 2023 Turkey–Syria earthquake and Denizlispor, therefore, were awarded a 3–0 win.

38	Yeni Malatyaspor	0–3 (w/o)	Denizlispor	Malatya
				Stadium: New Malatya Stadium
Note: Yeni Malatyaspor withdrew from the league due to the 2023 Turkey–Syria earthquake and Denizlispor, therefore, were awarded a 3–0 win.

=== Turkish Cup ===
19 October 2022 Third round	Denizlispor	2–1	Ayvalıkgücü Belediyespor	Denizli
14:00 TRT (UTC+3)	Gündem 61' (yellow card) 75'; Akdarı 87'	Report	Hüner 1'; Berber (yellow card) 60'	Stadium: Atatürk Stadium; Referee: Yalçın Taşkınfurat

10 November 2022 Fourth round	Denizlispor	0–5	Şanlıurfaspor	Denizli
17:00 TRT (UTC+3)	Akdarı (yellow card) 38'; Furtuna (yellow card) 90+3'	Report	Erboğa 8' (pen.), 55' (pen.); Belen (penalty missed) 37' 39' (yellow card) 39'; Erkan (yellow card) 42'; Balat 69', 82'; Sürgülü (yellow card) 88'	Stadium: Atatürk Stadium; Referee: Ali Yılmaz

== Statistics ==
=== Squad statistics ===
No.	Pos	Nat	Player	Total		TFF First League		Turkish Cup	
No.	Pos	Nat	Player	Apps	Goals	Apps	Goals	Apps	Goals
1	GK	(Turkey) TUR	Hüseyin Altıntaş	26	0	25	0	1	0
4	DF	(Turkey) TUR	Muhammet Özkal	28	0	27	0	1	0
5	DF	(Turkey) TUR	Hakan Çinemre	28	1	27	1	1	0
6	DF	(Turkey) TUR	Asım Hamzaçebi	17	0	15	0	2	0
7	FW	(Turkey) TUR	Ömer Şişmanoğlu	25	8	24	8	1	0
8	DF	(Turkey) TUR	Özer Özdemir	19	3	19	3	0	0
9	FW	(Gabon) GAB	Kévin Mayi	17	2	17	2	0	0
10	MF	(Turkey) TUR	Okan Derici	28	1	26	1	2	0
11	FW	(Turkey) TUR	Mehmet Ali Ulaman	3	0	3	0	0	0
12	FW	(Turkey) TUR	Alihan Kalkan	4	0	4	0	0	0
13	GK	(Turkey) TUR	Ali Eren Yalçın	0	0	0	0	0	0
14	MF	(Turkey) TUR	Bekir Turaç Böke	32	3	31	3	1	0
15	DF	(Turkey) TUR	Oğuz Yılmaz	25	4	24	4	1	0
17	MF	(Turkey) TUR	Deniz Kodal	2	0	2	0	0	0
20	GK	(Turkey) TUR	Abdülkadir Sünger	11	0	10	0	1	0
22	DF	(France) FRA	Léo Schwechlen	23	0	23	0	0	0
23	DF	(Turkey) TUR	Erdal Akdarı	20	1	18	0	2	1
24	DF	(Turkey) TUR	Emirhan Kaşcıoğlu	1	0	1	0	0	0
26	DF	(Turkey) TUR	Gökhan Süzen	33	2	32	2	1	0
27	DF	(Turkey) TUR	Emre Sağlık	24	0	23	0	1	0
37	MF	(Turkey) TUR	Alaattin Öner	4	0	3	0	1	0
45	DF	(Turkey) TUR	Ahmet Tekin	2	0	2	0	0	0
55	MF	(Turkey) TUR	Atakan Demir	1	0	1	0	0	0
60	MF	(Turkey) TUR	Mehmet Eren Sıngın	3	0	3	0	0	0
64	MF	(Turkey) TUR	Emre Furtana	3	0	2	0	1	0
66	DF	(Turkey) TUR	Berkant Gündem	29	1	27	0	2	1
67	MF	(Turkey) TUR	Yusuf Emre İnanır	3	0	2	0	1	0
68	DF	(Turkey) TUR	Oktay Kısaoğlu	3	0	2	0	1	0
70	MF	(Turkey) TUR	Samet Emre Gündüz	13	0	11	0	2	0
72	MF	(Turkey) TUR	Muhammed Gönülaçar	31	0	30	0	1	0
77	MF	(Turkey) TUR	Mustafa Çeçenoğlu	31	5	30	5	1	0
80	FW	(Turkey) TUR	Emre Burgaz	3	0	3	0	0	0
99	FW	(Turkey) TUR	Oğuzhan Sarı	10	0	8	0	2	0
Players left during the season
94	MF	(Turkey) TUR	Eren Kıryolcu	1	0	0	0	1	0
97	MF	(Ivory Coast) CIV	Brice Dja Djédjé	19	0	19	0	0	0

=== Goalscorers ===
Rank	No.	Pos.	Nat.	Player	TFF First League	Turkish Cup	Total
1	7	FW	(Turkey)	Ömer Şişmanoğlu	8	0	8
2	77	MF	(Turkey)	Mustafa Çeçenoğlu	5	0	5
3	15	DF	(Turkey)	Oğuz Yılmaz	4	0	4
4	8	DF	(Turkey)	Özer Özdemir	3	0	3
4	14	MF	(Turkey)	Bekir Turaç Böke	3	0	3
6	9	FW	(Gabon)	Kévin Mayi	2	0	2
6	26	DF	(Turkey)	Gökhan Süzen	2	0	2
8	5	DF	(Turkey)	Hakan Çinemre	1	0	1
8	10	MF	(Turkey)	Okan Derici	1	0	1
8	66	DF	(Turkey)	Berkant Gündem	0	1	1
8	23	DF	(Turkey)	Erdal Akdarı	0	1	1
Awarded					6	0	6
Totals					35	2	37

=== Cleansheets ===
Rank	No.	Nat.	Player	TFF First League	Turkish Cup	Total
1	1	(Turkey)	Hüseyin Altıntaş	4	0	4
Totals				4	0	4

=== Disciplinary record ===
N	P	Nat.	Name	TFF First League			Turkish Cup			Total			Notes
N	P	Nat.	Name	Yellow card	Second yellow card	Red card	Yellow card	Second yellow card	Red card	Yellow card	Second yellow card	Red card	Notes
27	DF	(Turkey)	Emre Sağlık	8						8			
77	MF	(Turkey)	Mustafa Çeçenoğlu	8						8			
72	MF	(Turkey)	Muhammed Gönülaçar	7						7			
23	DF	(France)	Léo Schwechlen	6		1				6		1	
97	MF	(Ivory Coast)	Brice Dja Djédjé	5						5			
5	DF	(Turkey)	Hakan Çinemre	4	1					4	1		
7	FW	(Turkey)	Ömer Şişmanoğlu	4						4			
4	DF	(Turkey)	Muhammet Özkal	3						3			
15	DF	(Turkey)	Oğuz Yılmaz	3						3			
26	DF	(Turkey)	Gökhan Süzen	3		1				3		1	
23	DF	(Turkey)	Erdal Akdarı	2			1			3			
8	DF	(Turkey)	Özer Özdemir	2						2			
14	MF	(Turkey)	Bekir Turaç Böke	2						2			
66	DF	(Turkey)	Berkant Gündem	1			1			2			
1	GK	(Turkey)	Hüseyin Altıntaş	1						1			
9	FW	(Gabon)	Kévin Mayi	1						1			
10	MF	(Turkey)	Okan Derici	1						1			
70	MF	(Turkey)	Samet Emre Gündüz	1						1			
68	GK	(Turkey)	Oktay Kısaoğlu	1						1			
20	GK	(Turkey)	Abdulkadir Sünger	1						1			
Totals				64	1	2	2			66	1	2	
