= List of Turkish football transfers winter 2015–16 =

This is a list of Turkish football transfers for the 2015–16 winter transfer window by club. Only transfers of clubs in the Süper Lig are included.

The winter transfer window opened on 1 January 2016, although a few transfers took place prior to that date. The window closed at midnight on 2 February 2016. Players without a club may join one at any time, either during or in between transfer windows.

== Süper Lig ==
=== Akhisar Belediyespor ===
In:

No.	Pos.	Nation	Player
5	MF	TUR	Kenan Karisik (from (Turkey) Şanlıurfaspor)
19	DF	TUR	Alper Uludağ (from (Turkey) Trabzonspor)
22	MF	MNE	Petar Grbić (from (Serbia) Partizan)

Out:

No.	Pos.	Nation	Player
15	DF	TUR	Orhan Taşdelen (released)
32	FW	COD	Lomana LuaLua (released)

=== Antalyaspor ===
In:

No.	Pos.	Nation	Player
55	MF	TUR	Oktay Delibalta (from (Turkey) Mersin İdmanyurdu)
77	FW	TUR	Ömer Şişmanoğlu (on loan from (Turkey) Beşiktaş)
90	MF	BEL	Danilo (from (Ukraine) Dnipro)

Out:

No.	Pos.	Nation	Player
4	MF	NGA	Stephen Sunday (to (United States) Real Salt Lake)

=== Beşiktaş ===
In:

No.	Pos.	Nation	Player
12	DF	ESP	Alexis (from (Spain) Getafe)
30	DF	BRA	Marcelo (on loan from (Germany) Hannover 96)
71	GK	UKR	Denys Boyko (from (Ukraine) Dnipro)
—	MF	ARM	Aras Özbiliz (from (Russia) Spartak Moscow)

Out:

No.	Pos.	Nation	Player
4	DF	SWE	Alexander Milošević (on loan to (Germany) Hannover 96)
22	DF	TUR	Ersan Gülüm (to Hebei China Fortune)
—	MF	ARM	Aras Özbiliz (on loan to (Spain) Rayo Vallecano)
—	FW	TUR	Ömer Şişmanoğlu (on loan to (Turkey) Antalyaspor)

=== Bursaspor ===
In:

No.	Pos.	Nation	Player
18	MF	ARG	Pablo Batalla (from (China) Beijing Guoan)

Out:

No.	Pos.	Nation	Player

=== Çaykur Rizespor ===
In:

No.	Pos.	Nation	Player

Out:

No.	Pos.	Nation	Player

=== Eskişehirspor ===
In:

No.	Pos.	Nation	Player
21	DF	ESP	Jordi (from (Spain) Real Betis)
27	FW	TUR	Nadir Çiftçi (on loan from (Scotland) Celtic)
35	FW	COD	Jeremy Bokila (on loan from (China) Guangzhou R&F)
66	MF	TUR	Kıvanç Karakaş (from (Turkey) Şanlıurfaspor)
80	MF	GEO	Tornike Okriashvili (on loan from (Belgium) Genk)
88	MF	BIH	Anel Hadžić (from (Austria) Sturm Graz)

Out:

No.	Pos.	Nation	Player
13	MF	SUI	Nassim Ben Khalifa (to (Belgium) Mechelen)
19	MF	MKD	Muarem Muarem (released)

=== Fenerbahçe ===
In:

No.	Pos.	Nation	Player

Out:

No.	Pos.	Nation	Player
29	FW	NGA	Emmanuel Emenike (on loan to (England) West Ham United)
41	MF	TUR	Hakan Çinemre (on loan to (Turkey) Gaziantepspor)

=== Galatasaray ===
In:

No.	Pos.	Nation	Player
15	DF	NED	Ryan Donk (from (Turkey) Kasımpaşa)
27	DF	NOR	Martin Linnes (from (Norway) Molde)

Out:

No.	Pos.	Nation	Player
12	MF	GER	Kevin Großkreutz (to (Germany) VfB Stuttgart)
17	FW	TUR	Burak Yılmaz (to (China) Beijing Guoan)
40	DF	TUR	Emre Can Coşkun (on loan to (Turkey) Giresunspor)
45	MF	TUR	Oğuzhan Kayar (on loan to (Turkey) Şanlıurfaspor)
94	MF	ARG	Lucas Ontivero (on loan to (Canada) Montreal Impact)

=== Gaziantepspor ===
In:

No.	Pos.	Nation	Player
33	DF	FRA	Prince-Désir Gouano (on loan from (Italy) Atalanta)
41	MF	TUR	Hakan Çinemre (on loan from (Turkey) Fenerbahçe)

Out:

No.	Pos.	Nation	Player
10	FW	TUR	Muhammet Demir (to (Turkey) Trabzonspor)

=== Gençlerbirliği ===
In:

No.	Pos.	Nation	Player
—	DF	BLR	Syarhey Palitsevich (from (Belarus) Dinamo Minsk)

Out:

No.	Pos.	Nation	Player

=== İstanbul Başakşehir ===
In:

No.	Pos.	Nation	Player

Out:

No.	Pos.	Nation	Player
17	MF	SEN	Stéphane Badji (to (Belgium) Anderlecht)

=== Kasımpaşa ===
In:

No.	Pos.	Nation	Player
12	MF	CZE	David Pavelka (from (Czech Republic) Slovan Liberec)
90	DF	BUL	Strahil Popov (from (Bulgaria) Litex Lovech)

Out:

No.	Pos.	Nation	Player
6	DF	NED	Ryan Donk (to (Turkey) Galatasaray)

=== Kayserispor ===
In:

No.	Pos.	Nation	Player
9	FW	BRA	William (from (Slovakia) MŠK Žilina)
16	GK	FRA	Ali Ahamada (from (France) Toulouse)

Out:

No.	Pos.	Nation	Player
4	DF	GER	Cüneyt Köz (released)
—	MF	TUR	Barış Özbek (to (Germany) MSV Duisburg)

=== Torku Konyaspor ===
In:

No.	Pos.	Nation	Player
—	DF	SCO	Barry Douglas (from (Poland) Lech Poznań)

Out:

No.	Pos.	Nation	Player

=== Mersin İdmanyurdu ===
In:

No.	Pos.	Nation	Player

Out:

No.	Pos.	Nation	Player
13	MF	TUR	Oktay Delibalta (to (Turkey) Antalyaspor)

=== Osmanlıspor ===
In:

No.	Pos.	Nation	Player

Out:

No.	Pos.	Nation	Player
48	MF	JPN	Takayuki Seto (on loan to (Romania) Astra Giurgiu)

=== Sivasspor ===
In:

No.	Pos.	Nation	Player
17	DF	LBN	Joan Oumari (from (Germany) FSV Frankfurt)
20	MF	ROU	Cristian Tănase (from (China) Tianjin Teda)
23	MF	NOR	Etzaz Hussain (from (Norway) Molde)

Out:

No.	Pos.	Nation	Player
7	MF	ESP	Dani Abalo (to (Spain) Alavés)

=== Trabzonspor ===
In:

No.	Pos.	Nation	Player
92	FW	TUR	Muhammet Demir (from (Turkey) Gaziantepspor)

Out:

No.	Pos.	Nation	Player
14	FW	SEN	Dame N'Doye (on loan to (England) Sunderland)
25	MF	CMR	Stéphane Mbia (to Hebei China Fortune)
—	DF	TUR	Alper Uludağ (to (Turkey) Akhisar Belediyespor)
