= Karišik =

Karišik is a Bosnian surname. Karišik comes from the Turkish word "karışık" which means "mixed". Notable people with the surname include:

- Eldin Karišik (born 1983), Swedish footballer
- Esad Karišik, Serbian-Bosniak football manager and former player
- Kenan Karisik (born 1987), Bosnian-Turkish footballer
- Miloš Karišik (born 1988), Serbian footballer
- Tanja Karišik-Košarac (born 1991), Bosnian cross country skier and biathlete

== See also ==
- İlişki Durumu: Karışık, remake of Full House (Turkish TV series)
- Teresia Karisik (Sage), a Marvel Comics character
