= Ferhat Erdoğan =

Turkish footballer

Personal information
- Date of birth: 18 June 2001 (age 25)
- Place of birth: Denizli, Turkey
- Position: Midfielder

Youth career
- 2012–2015: Sarayköy 1926
- 2015–2019: Denizlispor
- 2020–2021: Çal Belediyespor

Senior career*
Years	Team	Apps	(Gls)
2021–2022	Denizlispor	2	(0)
2022–	Develi Spor		
- * Club domestic league appearances and goals as of 19 April 2022

Ferhat Erdoğan (born 18 June 2001) is a Turkish professional footballer who plays as a midfielder for an amateur side Develi Spor.

== Professional career ==
Yıldırım is a youth product of Sarayköy 1926, Denizlispor, Altınordu, and Çal Belediyespor. He signed his first professional contract with Denizlispor on 26 January 2021. He made his professional debut with Denizlispor in a 5–1 Süper Lig loss to Fatih Karagümrük on 15 March 2021.
