= Mert Sarıkuş =

Turkish footballer

Personal information
- Date of birth: 31 May 2001 (age 25)
- Place of birth: Denizli, Turkey
- Height: 1.92 m (6 ft 4 in)
- Position: Winger

Team information
- Current team: Denizlispor
- Number: 72

Youth career
- 2013-2014: Denizli Eğitimspor
- 2014-2015: Sarayköy 1926
- 2015-2021: Denizlispor

Senior career*
Years	Team	Apps	(Gls)
2021–2022	Denizlispor	1	(0)
2021	→ Vanspor FK (loan)	0	(0)
- * Club domestic league appearances and goals as of 27 August 2022

Mert Sarıkuş (born 13 May 2001) is a Turkish professional footballer who plays as a winger.

== Club career ==
On 2 October 2020, Sarıkuş signed his first professional contract with Denizlispor. Sarıkuş made his professional debut with Denizlispor in a 2-0 Süper Lig loss to Hatayspor on 17 January 2021.
