= Emre Yıldırım =

Azerbaijani footballer (born 2002)

Personal information
- Date of birth: 1 January 2002 (age 24)
- Place of birth: Denizli, Turkey
- Height: 1.90 m (6 ft 3 in)
- Position: Defender

Team information
- Current team: Denizlispor
- Number: 3

Youth career
- 2013–2015: Sarayköy 1926
- 2015–2021: Denizlispor

Senior career*
Years	Team	Apps	(Gls)
2021–	Denizlispor	2	(0)
2022	→ Tepecikspor (loan)	8	(0)
2022–2023	→ Gümüşhanespor (loan)	7	(0)

International career
2020	Azerbaijan U19	2	(0)
- * Club domestic league appearances and goals as of 23:28, 3 July 2023 (UTC)

Emre Yıldırım (born 1 January 2002) is a professional footballer who plays as a defender for Denizlispor. Born in Turkey, he represents Azerbaijan internationally.

== Professional career ==
Yıldırım is a youth product of Sarayköy 1926 and Denizlispor, and signed his first professional contract with Denizlispor in January 2021. He made his professional debut for Denizlispor in a 5–1 Süper Lig loss to Fatih Karagümrük on 15 March 2021.

== International career ==
Yıldırım was called up to a camp for the Turkey U16s in March 2018. He represented the Azerbaijan U19s in a pair of friendlies in October 2020.
