= Hüseyin Furkan Uslu =

Turkish footballer

Personal information
- Date of birth: 6 September 2002 (age 24)
- Place of birth: Osmangazi, Turkey
- Position: Midfielder

Team information
- Current team: Bursa Yıldırımspor
- Number: 29

Youth career
- 2012–2019: Bursa Arabayatağı
- 2019–2021: Denizlispor

Senior career*
| Years | Team | Apps | (Gls) |
| 2021 | Denizlispor | 3 | (0) |
| 2022– | Bursa Yıldırımspor | 17 | (0) |
- * Club domestic league appearances and goals as of 12 November 2022

Hüseyin Furkan Uslu (born 6 September 2002) is a Turkish professional footballer who plays as a midfielder for TFF Third League club Bursa Yıldırımspor.

== Professional career ==
Yıldırım is a youth product of Arabayatağıspor, and Denizlispor. He signed his first professional contract with Denizlispor on 26 January 2021. He made his professional debut with Denizlispor in a 5–1 Süper Lig loss to Fatih Karagümrük on 15 March 2021.
