= Mehmet Ali Ulaman =

Turkish footballer

Personal information
- Date of birth: 3 April 2003 (age 23)
- Place of birth: Denizli, Turkey
- Position: Winger

Team information
- Current team: Denizlispor
- Number: 11

Youth career
- 2013–2014: Varol Tekstil Şirinköyspor
- 2014–2015: Sarayköy 1926
- 2015–2021: Denizlispor

Senior career*
Years	Team	Apps	(Gls)
2021–	Denizlispor	7	(0)
- * Club domestic league appearances and goals as of 15:49, 9 May 2023 (UTC)

Mehmet Ali Ulaman (born 3 April 2003) is a Turkish professional footballer who plays as a winger for Denizlispor.

== Professional career ==
Yıldırım is a youth product of Arabayatağıspor, and Denizlispor. He signed his first professional contract with Denizlispor on 26 January 2021. He made his professional debut with Denizlispor in a 5–1 Süper Lig loss to Fatih Karagümrük on 15 March 2021.
