= Hakan Çinemre =

Turkish footballer (born 1994)

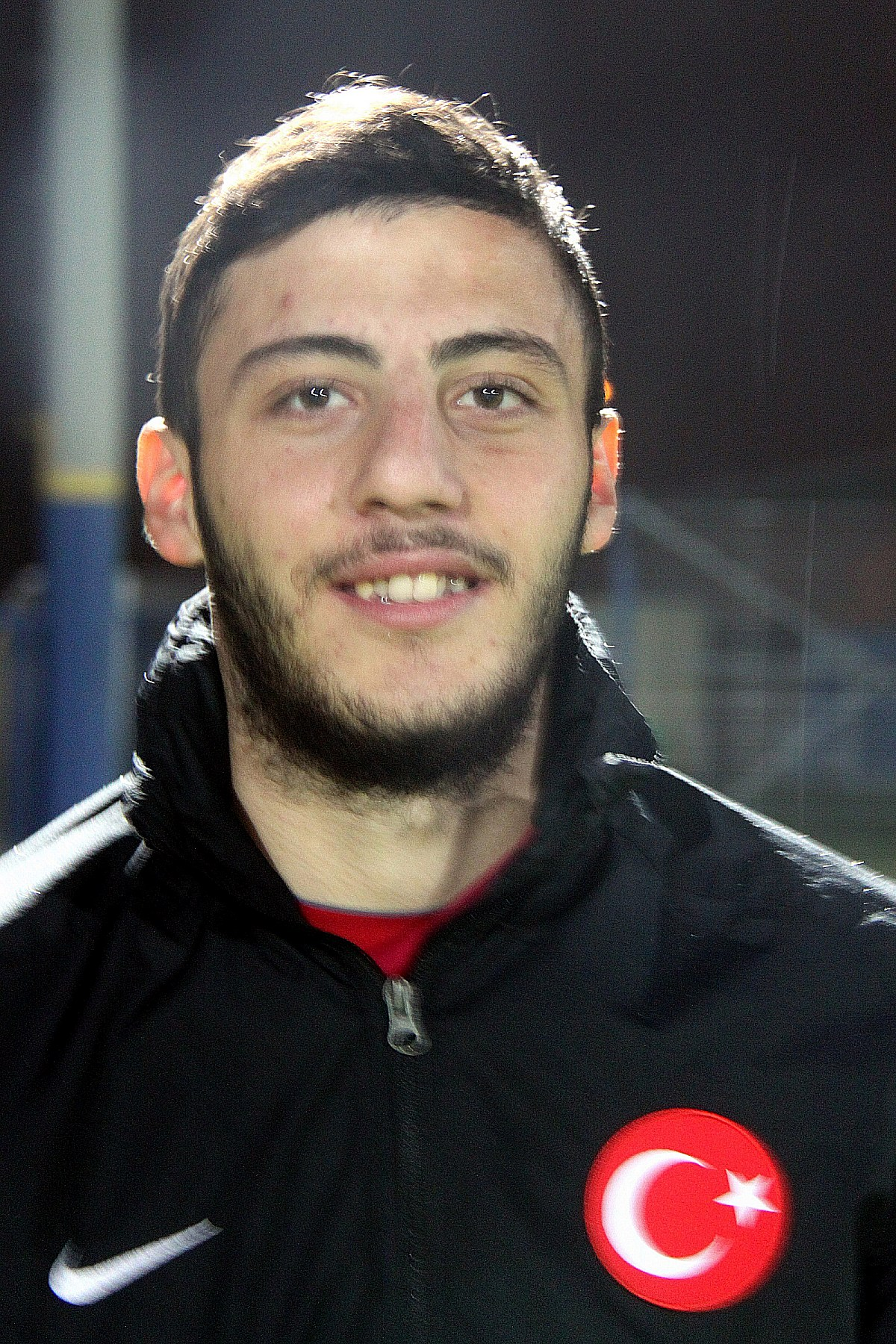

Personal information
- Full name: Hakan Çinemre
- Date of birth: 14 February 1994 (age 32)
- Place of birth: Gölcük, Turkey
- Height: 1.84 m (6 ft 0 in)
- Position: Centre back

Team information
- Current team: Hatayspor
- Number: 5

Youth career
- 2006–2007: Anadolu Yeniköyspor
- 2007–2010: Gölcükspor
- 2010–2013: Fenerbahçe

Senior career*
Years	Team	Apps	(Gls)
2013–2017	Fenerbahçe	0	(0)
2013–2014	→ Bucaspor (loan)	29	(1)
2015	→ Adana Demirspor (loan)	19	(2)
2016	→ Gaziantepspor (loan)	5	(0)
2016–2017	→ Eskişehirspor (loan)	33	(1)
2017–2020	Göztepe	2	(0)
2020	→ Adanaspor (loan)	14	(1)
2020–2021	Adanaspor	19	(2)
2021–2023	Denizlispor	45	(5)
2023–2025	Arnavutköy Belediyespor	51	(4)
2025–2026	Orduspor 1967	14	(1)
2026-	Hatayspor	14	(1)

International career^{‡}
2011	Turkey U18	2	(0)
2012–2013	Turkey U19	7	(0)
2013–2014	Turkey U20	8	(0)
2013–2016	Turkey U21	11	(0)
- * Club domestic league appearances and goals as of 7 May 2026 ‡ National team caps and goals as of 06:17, 27 January 2022 (UTC)

Hakan Çinemre (born 14 February 1994), is a Turkish professional football player who plays as a centre back for TFF 1. Lig club Hatayspor.

== Professional career ==
A youth academy product of Fenerbahçe, Hakan mostly played on loan with various second division Turkish teams. On 7 September 2013, he joined Bucaspor on loan. On 27 January 2015, he joined Adana Demirspor on loan, for the rest of the 2014–15 season. He was loaned again, for the remainder of the 2015–16 season to Gaziantepspor. While there, he made his professional debut in the Süper Lig, in a 1–0 loss to Akhisar Belediyespor on 14 February 2016.

Hakan transferred to Göztepe on 25 July 2017. On 16 January 2020, Çinemre joined Adanaspor on loan, until the end of the season. In October 2020, Adanaspor announced that Hakan had joined permanently, signing a two-year contract.

Hakan joined Denizlispor on 30 August 2021, signing a two-year contract.

On 30 July 2023, Cinemre joined Arnavutköy Belediyespor.

== Career statistics ==
=== Club ===
As of 17 November 2023

Appearances and goals by club, season and competition
Club	Season	League			National Cup		Total	
Club	Season	Division	Apps	Goals	Apps	Goals	Apps	Goals
Bucaspor (loan)	2013–14	TFF First League	29	1	1	0	30	1
Fenerbahçe	2014–15	Süper Lig	0	0	1	0	1	0
Adana Demirspor (loan)	2014–15	TFF First League	19	2	1	0	20	2
Gaziantepspor (loan)	2015–16	Süper Lig	5	0	2	1	7	1
Eskişehirspor (loan)	2016–17	TFF First League	33	1	0	0	33	1
Göztepe	2017–18	Süper Lig	1	0	1	0	2	0
Göztepe	2018–19	Süper Lig	1	0	2	0	3	0
Göztepe	Total		2	0	3	0	5	0
Adanaspor (loan)	2019–20	TFF First League	14	1	0	0	14	1
Adanaspor	2020–21	TFF First League	19	2	0	0	19	2
Denizlispor	2021–22	TFF First League	18	4	1	0	19	4
Denizlispor	2022–23	TFF First League	27	1	1	0	28	1
Denizlispor	Total		45	5	2	0	47	5
Arnavutköy Belediyespor	2023–24	TFF Second League	10	1	0	0	10	1
Career total			176	14	10	1	186	15
