= Hüseyin Altıntaş =

Turkish footballer

Personal information
- Date of birth: 11 September 1994 (age 32)
- Place of birth: Denizli, Turkey
- Height: 1.92 m (6 ft 4 in)
- Position: Goalkeeper

Team information
- Current team: 68 Yeni Aksarayspor
- Number: 1

Youth career
- 2006-2008: Sarayköy 1926
- 2008-2012: Denizlispor

Senior career*
Years	Team	Apps	(Gls)
2012–2023	Denizlispor	36	(0)
2012–2013	→ Belediye Bingölspor (loan)	12	(0)
2013–2017	→ Sarayköy 1926 (loan)	18	(0)
2023–2025	Balıkesirspor	52	(0)
2025–2026	Karaman FK	16	(0)
2026	Somaspor	11	(0)
2026–	68 Yeni Aksarayspor	4	(0)
- * Club domestic league appearances and goals as of 1 October 2026

Hüseyin Altıntaş (born 11 September 1994) is a Turkish professional footballer who plays as a goalkeeper for TFF 2. Lig club 68 Yeni Aksarayspor.

== Club career ==
Altıntaş is a youth product of the academies of Sarayköy 1926 and Denizlispor. He signed his first professional contract with Denizlospor in 2012, and went on successive loans with Belediye Bingölspor and Sarayköy. A long-term reserve goalkeeper for Denizlispor, Altıntaş made his professional debut with the team in a 2-0 Turkish Cup win over Trabzonspor on 23 January 2020.
