= Abdülkadir Sünger =

Turkish footballer

Personal information
- Date of birth: 24 May 2000 (age 26)
- Place of birth: Denizli, Turkey
- Height: 1.88 m (6 ft 2 in)
- Position: Goalkeeper

Team information
- Current team: Sanliurfaspor
- Number: 20

Youth career
- 2012–2016: Sarayköy 1926
- 2016–2020: Denizlispor

Senior career*
Years	Team	Apps	(Gls)
2020–2024	Denizlispor	63	(0)
2024–	Sanliurfaspor	25	(0)
- * Club domestic league appearances and goals as of 1 October 2026

Abdülkadir Sünger (born 24 May 2000) is a Turkish professional footballer who plays as a goalkeeper for TFF 2. Lig club Sanliurfaspor.

== Professional career ==
Sünger is a youth product of Sarayköy 1926, and moved to the academy of Denizlispor in 2016. He signed his first professional contract in 2020. Sünger made his professional debut with Denizlispor in a 3–2 Süper Lig loss to Alanyaspor on 12 April 2021.
