= Brahim Darri =

Dutch footballer (born 1994)

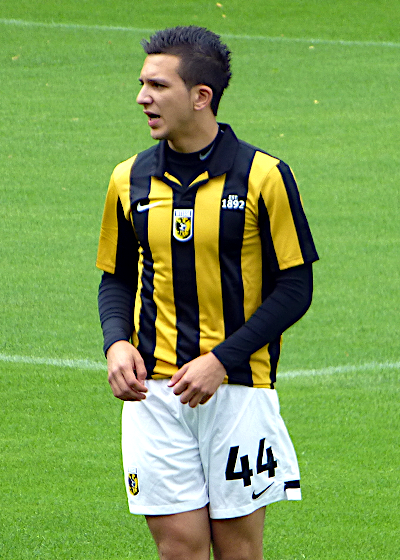

Personal information
- Date of birth: 14 September 1994 (age 32)
- Place of birth: Amersfoort, Netherlands
- Height: 1.75 m (5 ft 9 in)
- Position: Winger

Team information
- Current team: Palm City
- Number: 11

Youth career
- –2003: CJVV
- 2003–2007: Ajax
- 2007–2011: Vitesse

Senior career*
Years	Team	Apps	(Gls)
2011–2015	Vitesse	3	(0)
2014	→ De Graafschap (loan)	13	(1)
2015–2018	Heracles	91	(6)
2018–2019	NEC	16	(4)
2019	→ Den Bosch (loan)	3	(0)
2019–2020	Fatih Karagümrük	39	(4)
2021	BB Erzurumspor	4	(0)
2021–2022	Samsunspor	0	(0)
2021–2022	→ Denizlispor (loan)	15	(2)
2022–2023	Mesaimeer	5	(1)
2023	Fatih Karagümrük	5	(0)
2024–2025	Dordrecht	0	(0)
2025	VVV	10	(0)
2025–	Palm City	0	(0)

International career
2011–2012	Netherlands U18	2	(0)
2012–2013	Netherlands U19	9	(1)
2013	Netherlands U20	2	(0)
2015	Netherlands U21	3	(1)
- * Club domestic league appearances and goals as of 15 May 2025

Brahim Darri (born 14 September 1994) is a Dutch footballer who plays as a winger for UAE First Division League club Palm City. Darri was born in the Netherlands to parents of Moroccan descent. Besides the Netherlands, he has played in Turkey and Qatar.

== Club career ==
Darri made his Eredivisie debut for Vitesse on 13 August 2011 in a 4–0 home win against VVV-Venlo, at just 16 years and 333 days old, being the youngest of the club's history. On 17 November 2011, he signed a professional contract with Vitesse, until 2014.

On 26 September 2012, Darri scored his first professional goal, in a 3–0 away win against VV Gemert in that season's KNVB Cup. On 18 December, Darri signed a two-year contract extension. He later played for Heracles and NEC, who loaned him to Den Bosch. He then embarked on a career in Turkey.

On 1 August 2024, Darri signed a contract with Dordrecht for two years, with an optional third year.

On 9 January 2025, he moved to VVV-Venlo on a half-season contract. Upon the expiry of his contract at the end of the season, VVV-Venlo opted not to renew, and Darri left the club as a free agent.

== International career ==
Darri played 9 games for the Netherlands national under-19 football team
