= Okan Derici =

Turkish footballer

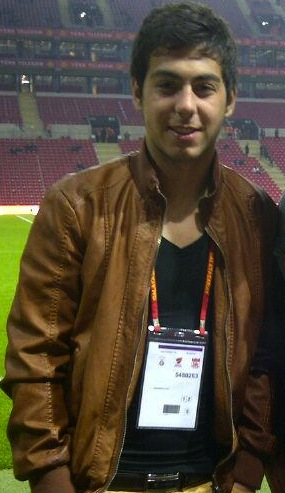

Personal information
- Date of birth: 16 April 1993 (age 33)
- Place of birth: Gießen, Germany
- Height: 1.77 m (5 ft 10 in)
- Position: Central midfielder

Team information
- Current team: Aliağa FK
- Number: 10

Youth career
- Eintracht Lollar
- –2008: TSG Wiesbeck
- 2008–2011: Eintracht Frankfurt

Senior career*
Years	Team	Apps	(Gls)
2011–2013	Galatasaray A2	0	(0)
2013–2014	Rot-Weiss Erfurt II	8	(1)
2013–2014	Rot-Weiss Erfurt	1	(0)
2014–2016	Konyaspor	2	(0)
2014–2015	→ Kırklarelispor (loan)	29	(7)
2015–2016	→ Konya Selçukspor (loan)	33	(7)
2016–2019	Gaziantep BB	38	(1)
2017	→ Altınordu (loan)	16	(5)
2019–2020	Altınordu	40	(9)
2020–2021	Ümraniyespor	24	(3)
2021–2023	Denizlispor	37	(3)
2023–2025	Kırklarelispor	63	(13)
2025–2026	Adana 01 FK	24	(2)
2026–	Aliağa FK	4	(1)

International career
2008	Turkey U15	2	(0)
2009	Germany U17	2	(0)
2009–2010	Turkey U17	14	(5)
2010–2011	Turkey U18	1	(1)
2010–2012	Turkey U19	11	(4)
- * Club domestic league appearances and goals as of 1 October 2026

Okan Derici (born 16 April 1993) is a footballer who plays for TFF 2. Lig club Aliağa FK. Born in Germany, he represented both Germany and Turkey internationally.

== International career ==
Derici represented Turkey at the 2010 UEFA European Under-17 Football Championship.
