= Oğuz Yılmaz (footballer) =

Turkish footballer

Personal information
- Date of birth: 1 January 1993 (age 33)
- Place of birth: Şişli, Turkey
- Height: 1.90 m (6 ft 3 in)
- Position: Defender

Team information
- Current team: Serikspor
- Number: 15

Youth career
- 2003–2010: Genclergucuspor
- 2010–2011: Pendikspor

Senior career*
Years	Team	Apps	(Gls)
2011–2016	Pendikspor	111	(3)
2016–2019	Balıkesirspor	61	(3)
2019–2023	Denizlispor	107	(9)
2023–2025	Kastamonuspor 1966	50	(1)
2025–2026	Fethiyespor	23	(1)
2026–	Serikspor	9	(0)
- * Club domestic league appearances and goals as of 14 November 2026

Oğuz Yılmaz (born 1 January 1993) is a Turkish professional footballer who plays as a defender for TFF 2. Lig club Serikspor.

== Club career ==
Yılmaz made his Süper Lig debut in a 2–0 win over Galatasaray on 16 August 2019.
