= Muhammet Özkal =

Turkish footballer

Personal information
- Full name: Muhammet Özkal
- Date of birth: 26 November 1999 (age 26)
- Place of birth: Körfez, Kocaeli, Turkey
- Position: Defender

Team information
- Current team: Karaman FK
- Number: 41

Youth career
- 2010-2017: Körfez SK

Senior career*
Years	Team	Apps	(Gls)
2017–2018	Körfez SK	30	(0)
2018–2020	BB Bodrumspor	26	(0)
2020–2024	Denizlispor	98	(2)
2024–2025	24 Erzincanspor	18	(0)
2025–	Karaman FK	6	(0)
- * Club domestic league appearances and goals as of 11:20, 15 October 2025 (UTC)

Muhammet Özkal (born 26 November 1999) is a Turkish professional footballer who plays as a defender for Turkish club Karaman FK.

== Club career ==
On 3 January 2020, Özkal signed a 4.5-year deal with Denizlispor. He made his Süper Lig debut in a 2-1 defeat over Galatasaray on 19 January 2020 and scored a goal in this game.
