= Kenan Karisik =

Bosnian-Turkish footballer (born 1987)

Kenan Karışık
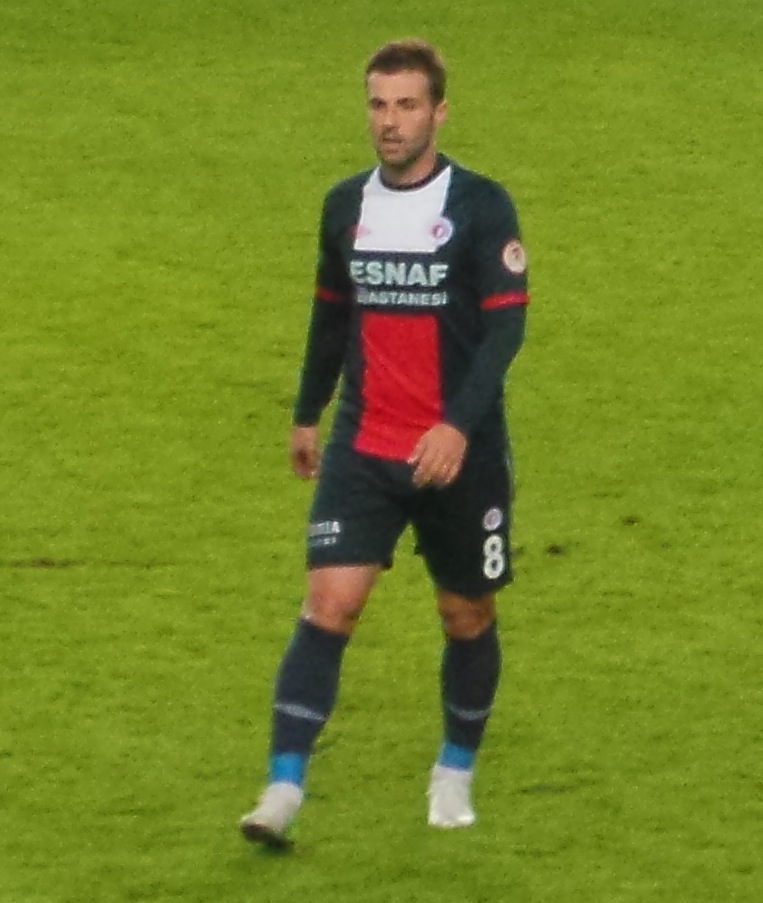

Personal information
- Full name: Kenan Karišik
- Date of birth: 23 April 1987 (age 39)
- Place of birth: Sjenica, SFR Yugoslavia
- Height: 1.87 m (6 ft 2 in)
- Position: Midfielder

Team information
- Current team: Bayrampaşaspor

Youth career
- 1999–2005: Yıldırım Bosna

Senior career*
Years	Team	Apps	(Gls)
2005–2006	Yıldırım Bosna	22	(0)
2006–2007	Altınordu	9	(0)
2007–2011	Nazilli Belediyespor	105	(7)
2011–2012	Konya Şeker	27	(2)
2012–2013	Anadolu Selçukluspor	26	(4)
2013–2014	Fethiyespor	32	(3)
2014–2016	Şanlıurfaspor	42	(3)
2016	Akhisar Belediyespor	0	(0)
2016–2017	Altınordu	13	(1)
2017–2018	Samsunspor	38	(1)
2018–2019	Adanaspor	16	(0)
2019–2020	Bayrampaşaspor	5	(0)
- * Club domestic league appearances and goals

Kenan Karišik (born 23 April 1987), is a Bosnian-Turkish former professional footballer.

He was born in Sjenica, SFR Yugoslavia and has dual citizenship, Bosnian and Turkish.

== Club career ==
He played with Fethiyespor in the Turkish First League, then between 2014 and 2016 he played with Şanlıurfaspor in the Turkish First League, and in 2016 he joined Akhisar Belediyespor and is playing the Turkish Super League.
