= Denizli Atatürk Stadium =

Association football stadium in Denizli, Turkey

Coordinates: 37°45′57.63″N 29°04′56.76″E

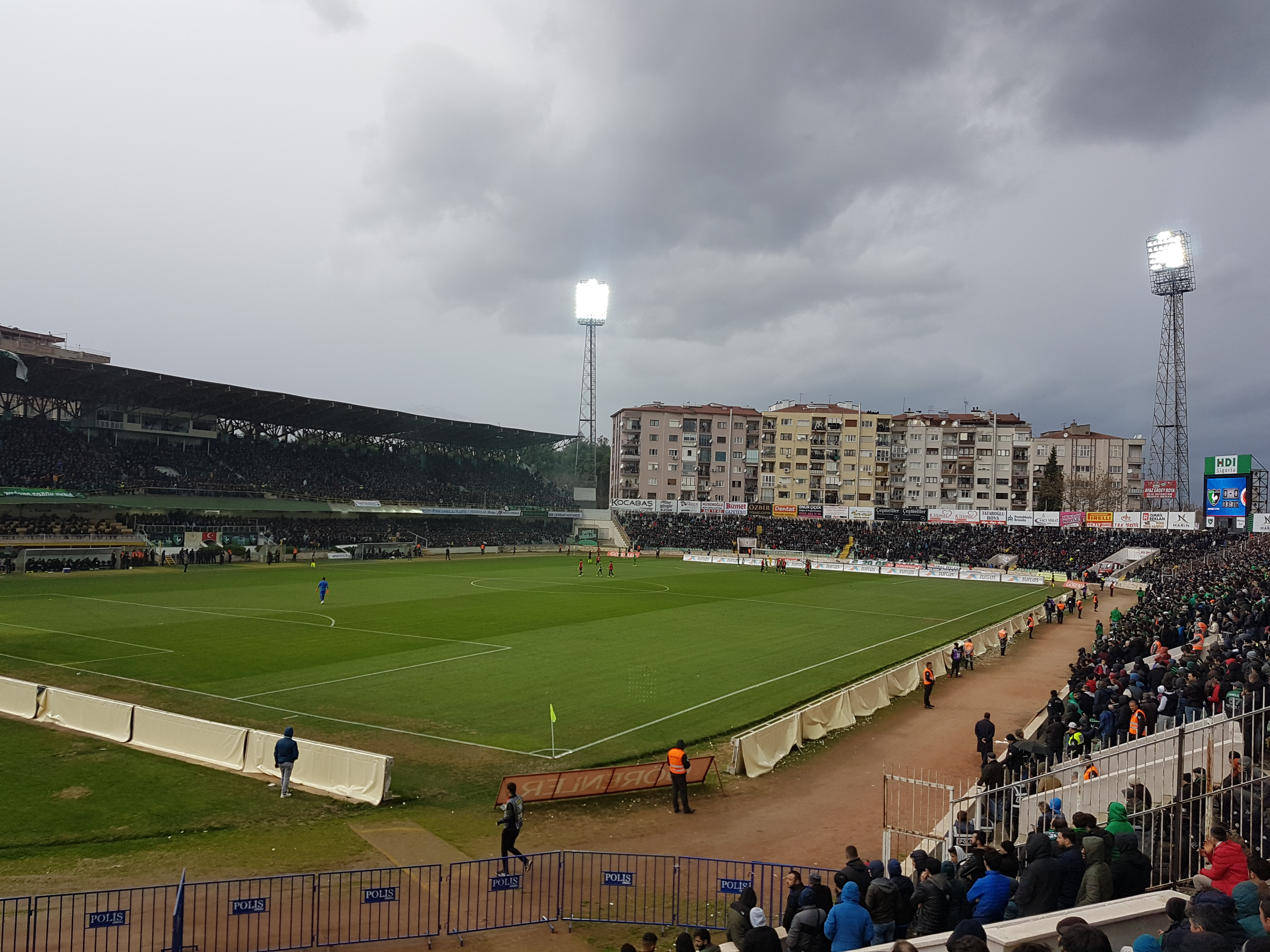
- Interactive map of Denizli Atatürk Stadium
- Location: Denizli, Turkey
- Owner: Denizlispor
- Capacity: 18,745
- Surface: Grass

Construction
- Opened: 1950
- Renovated: 1987, 2019

Denizli Atatürk Stadium (Turkish: Denizli Atatürk Stadyumu) is a multi-purpose stadium in Denizli, Turkey. It is currently used mostly for football matches and is the home ground of Denizlispor. The stadium holds 18,745 people and was built in 1950.

Denizlispor completed 2018–19 TFF First League season as champions, promoting to Süper Lig after 9 years. As a result of this, Denizlispor renovated the stadium and increased its seating capacity from 14,979 to 18,745.

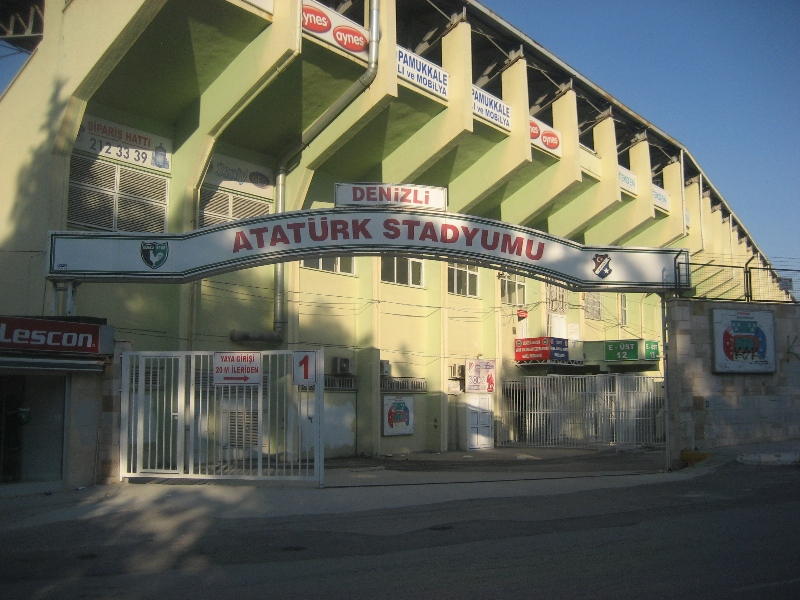
Denizli Atatürk Stadium entrance gate in Denizli
