= Muhammed Eren Kıryolcu =

Turkish footballer

Eren Kıryolcu
Personal information
- Full name: Muhammed Eren Kıryolcu
- Date of birth: 21 February 2003 (age 23)
- Place of birth: Yıldırım, Turkey
- Height: 1.86 m (6 ft 1 in)
- Position: Defender

Team information
- Current team: Osmaniyespor FK
- Number: 16

Youth career
- 2014–2015: Bursa Genç
- 2015–2016: Nilüfer Gençlikspor
- 2016: Altınordu
- 2016–2018: Kasımpaşa
- 2018–2019: Fethiye İY
- 2019–2020: Denizlispor

Senior career*
Years	Team	Apps	(Gls)
2020–	Denizlispor	5	(0)
2023	→ Darıca Gençlerbirliği (loan)	4	(0)
- * Club domestic league appearances and goals as of 23:24, 3 July 2023 (UTC)

Muhammed Eren Kıryolcu (born 21 February 2003) is a Turkish professional footballer who plays as a defender for Osmaniyespor FK.

== Professional career ==
Kıryolcu began playing football in his local youth academy Bursa Genç, before stints in the academies of Nilüfer Gençlikspor, Altınordu, Kasımpaşa, Fethiye İY, and finally Denizlispor in 2019. He signed his first professional contract with Denizlispor on 10 September 2020. He made his professional debut with Denizlispor in a 1–0 Süper Lig loss to Hatayspor on 8 May 2020.
