= Mümin Özkasap =

Turkish footballer (born 1944)

Mümin Özkasap (born 1 March 1944) is a Turkish former footballer from Manisa. His name is recalled in the Manisa's Mümin Özkasap Stadium. He played as a goalkeeper for Eskişehirspor and for his country in the 1969 RCD Cup.
