= Erdal Akdarı =

Turkish footballer (born 1993)

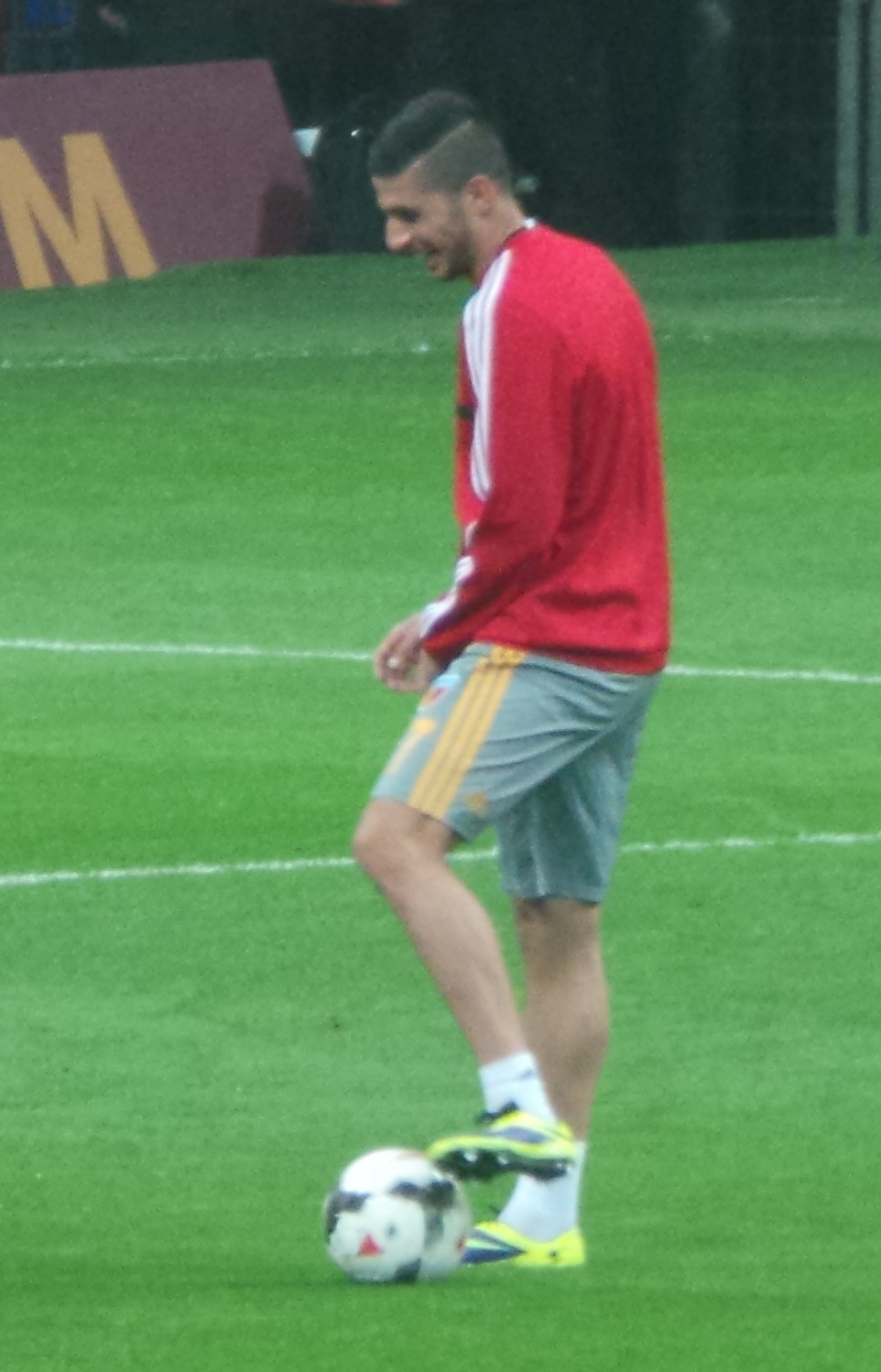
- Akdarı warming up for Kayserispor in 2014

Personal information
- Full name: Erdal Akdarı
- Date of birth: 5 June 1993 (age 33)
- Place of birth: Batman, Turkey
- Height: 1.83 m (6 ft 0 in)
- Position: Defender

Youth career
- 2005–2009: MTV Treubund Lüneburg
- 2009–2011: Hannover 96

Senior career*
Years	Team	Apps	(Gls)
2011–2012	Hannover 96 II	22	(1)
2012–2014	Kayserispor	5	(0)
2015	Hamburger SV II	1	(0)
2015–2018	SV Babelsberg 03	81	(6)
2018–2021	Eskişehirspor	38	(7)
2021–2023	Denizlispor	31	(0)

International career
2010	Turkey U17	2	(0)
2010–2011	Turkey U18	6	(0)
2012	Turkey U19	5	(0)
2013	Turkey U20	2	(0)
- * Club domestic league appearances and goals as of 15:52, 9 May 2023 (UTC)

Erdal Akdarı (born 5 June 1993) is a Turkish footballer who plays as a defender.

== Club career ==
He made his Süper Lig debut on 1 September 2012.
