= Kévin Mayi =

Gabonese footballer (born 1993)

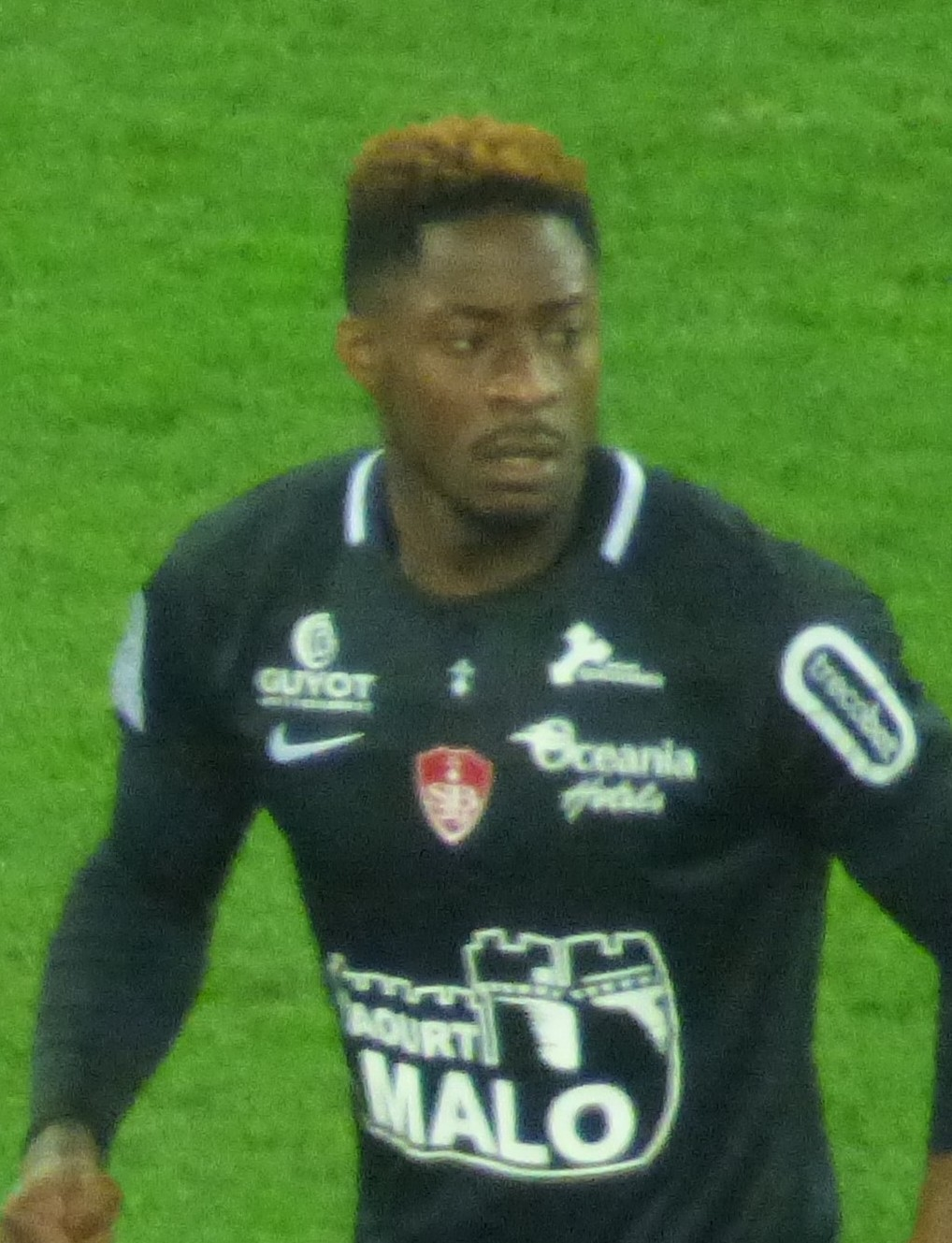
- Mayi in 2018.

Personal information
- Full name: Ulrich Kévin Selom Mayi
- Date of birth: 14 January 1993 (age 33)
- Place of birth: Lyon, France
- Height: 1.82 m (6 ft 0 in)
- Position: Striker

Youth career
- 2005–2007: Cheminots Saint-Priest
- 2007–2012: Saint-Étienne

Senior career*
Years	Team	Apps	(Gls)
2011–2013	Saint-Étienne B	35	(8)
2012–2014	Saint-Étienne	8	(0)
2013–2014	→ Niort (loan)	23	(3)
2014–2016	Gazélec Ajaccio	51	(9)
2016–2017	NEC	26	(4)
2017–2020	Brest	41	(2)
2020–2021	Ümraniyespor	25	(4)
2021–2023	Denizlispor	40	(7)
2023–2024	Ankara Keçiörengücü	9	(0)
2024	Lokomotiv Sofia	12	(1)

International career^{‡}
2012	France U19	3	(0)
2012–2013	France U20	8	(0)
2021–	Gabon	5	(0)
- * Club domestic league appearances and goals as of 28 June 2024 ‡ National team caps and goals as of 6 December 2022

Ulrich Kévin Selom Mayi (born 14 January 1993) is a professional footballer who plays as a striker. Born in France, he plays for the Gabon national team.

== Career ==
Mayi made his professional debut on 7 May 2012 in a league match against Marseille appearing as a substitute.

In August 2014, he joined Gazélec Ajaccio, newly promoted to Ligue 2, on a season-long contract.

In July 2016, Mayi signed with Eredivisie side NEC.

== International career ==
Born in France, Mayi is of Gabonese descent. He is a youth international for France. He debuted for the Gabon national team in a 3–0 2021 Africa Cup of Nations qualification win over DR Congo on 25 March 2021.

== Career statistics ==
=== Club ===
As of match played 1 July 2019

Appearances and goals by club, season and competition
Club	Season	League			Cup (Note: Includes Coupe de France, Coupe de la Ligue)		Other		Total	
Club	Season	Division	Apps	Goals	Apps	Goals	Apps	Goals	Apps	Goals
Saint-Étienne	2011–12	Ligue 1	1	0	0	0	—		1	0
Saint-Étienne	2012–13	Ligue 1	7	0	5	1	—		12	1
Saint-Étienne	Total		8	0	5	1	—		13	1
Chamois Niortais (loan)	2013–14	Ligue 2	23	3	4	1	—		27	4
Gazélec Ajaccio	2014–15	Ligue 2	26	6	3	0	—		29	6
Gazélec Ajaccio	2015–16	Ligue 1	23	3	5	2	—		28	5
Gazélec Ajaccio	Total		49	9	8	2	—		57	11
NEC	2016–17	Eredivisie	26	4	1	0	4 (Note: Four appearances in the Eredivisie relegation playoffs)	1	31	5
Brest	2017–18	Ligue 2	14	0	1	0	0	0	15	0
Brest	2018–19	Ligue 2	25	2	3	3	2	0	30	4
Brest	Total		39	2	4	3	2	0	45	5
Career total			145	18	22	7	6	1	173	26
