= Gökhan Süzen =

Turkish footballer

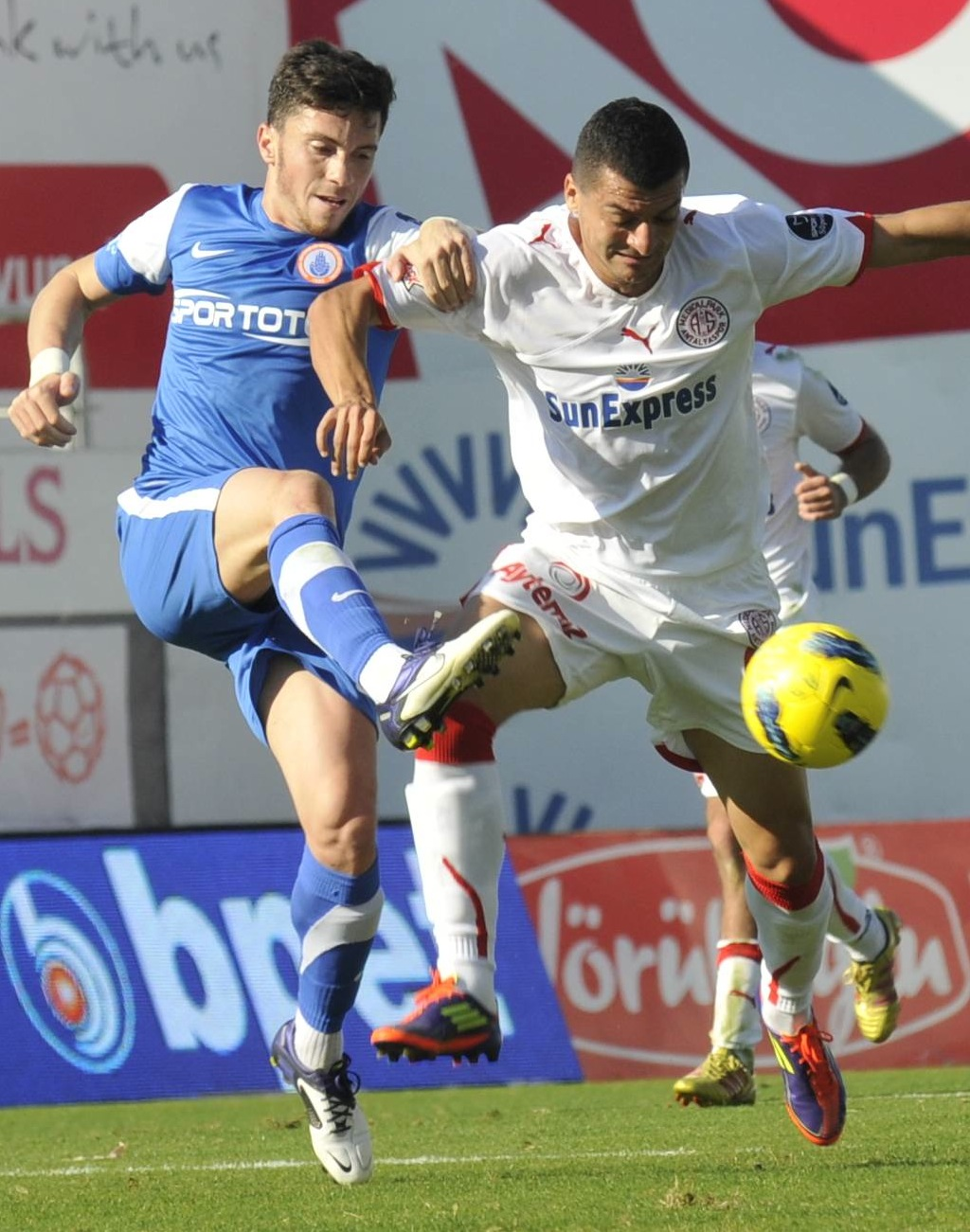
- Süzen (left) playing for İstanbul BB in 2011

Personal information
- Full name: Gökhan Süzen
- Date of birth: July 12, 1987 (age 39)
- Place of birth: Düzce, Turkey
- Height: 1.81 m (5 ft 11 1/2 in)
- Position: Left back

Team information
- Current team: Altınordu
- Number: 5

Youth career
- 2003–2006: Galatasaray A2

Senior career*
Years	Team	Apps	(Gls)
2006–2013	İstanbul BB	105	(2)
2013–2015	Beşiktaş	11	(0)
2014–2015	→ Gaziantepspor (loan)	18	(0)
2016	Sivasspor	4	(0)
2016–2017	Tokatspor	15	(1)
2017	Sivasspor	10	(0)
2017–2018	Adanaspor	28	(2)
2018–2019	Denizlispor	17	(0)
2019–2021	Ümraniyespor	60	(6)
2021–2024	Denizlispor	95	(19)
2025	Denizlispor	14	(3)
2026–	Altınordu	3	(0)

International career
2011	Turkey A2	1	(0)
- * Club domestic league appearances and goals as of 08:40, 12 May 2026 (UTC)

Gökhan Süzen (born July 12, 1987 in Düzce) is a Turkish footballer who plays as a defender for Altınordu.

== Career ==
=== Club career ===
On 5 January 2013, Süzen signed to Beşiktaş J.K. with a €1.00 million transfer fee from Istanbul Büyükşehir Belediyespor On 1 September 2014, Beşiktaş loaned Süzen out Gaziantepspor for 2014–15 season.

=== International career ===
On 12 November 2011, Süzen invited to Turkey national football team by then-coach Guus Hiddink, for a friendly game against Netherlands but he has not been capped.
