= Léo Schwechlen =

French footballer (born 1989)

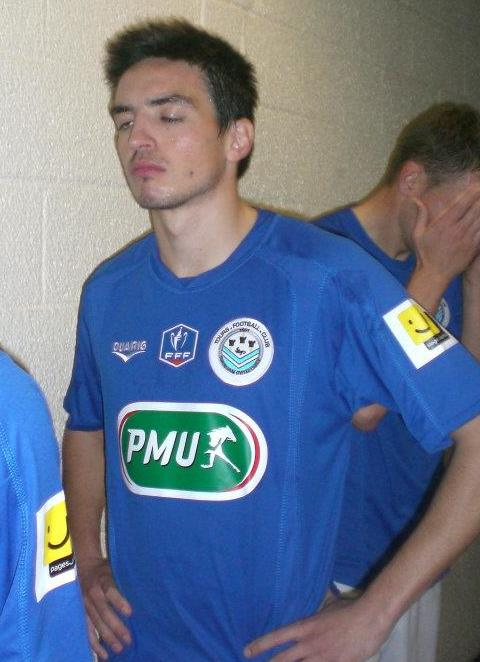
- Schwechlen pictured in 2011

Personal information
- Full name: Léo Schwechlen
- Date of birth: 5 June 1989 (age 37)
- Place of birth: Montbéliard, France
- Height: 1.82 m (6 ft 0 in)
- Position: Left-back

Youth career
- 1996–1999: Promo Besançon
- 1999–2004: Racing Besançon
- 2004–2010: Monaco

Senior career*
Years	Team	Apps	(Gls)
2010–2011	Monaco B	27	(3)
2011–2015	Tours	118	(2)
2013–2014	Tours B	2	(0)
2015–2016	Anorthosis Famagusta	24	(2)
2016–2018	Göztepe	58	(1)
2018–2019	BB Erzurumspor	34	(1)
2019–2020	Göztepe	6	(0)
2020–2021	BB Erzurumspor	27	(1)
2021–2023	Denizlispor	52	(0)
2023–2025	Tours	8	(0)
2025	Bassin d'Arcachon	11	(0)
- * Club domestic league appearances and goals as of 17 May 2025

Léo Schwechlen (born 5 June 1989) is a French professional footballer who plays as a defender.

== Career ==
Born in Montbéliard, Schwechlen spent his early career with Promo Besançon, Racing Besançon, Monaco, Tours and Anorthosis Famagusta and Göztepe.

Schwechlen quit Göztepe on 8 June 2018.

Schwechlen joined BB Erzurumspor on 27 June 2018. On 12 August 2018, Schwechlen scored the first ever Süper Lig goal in the club's history, against Konyaspor at Konya Büyükşehir Stadium, in which they lost 2–3. He played every minute of every league match during the 2018–19 season.

In August 2019 he returned to Göztepe. On 18 June 2020, Göztepe announced that Schwechlen terminated his contract because of unpaid wages.
