= Özer Özdemir =

Footballer (born 1998)

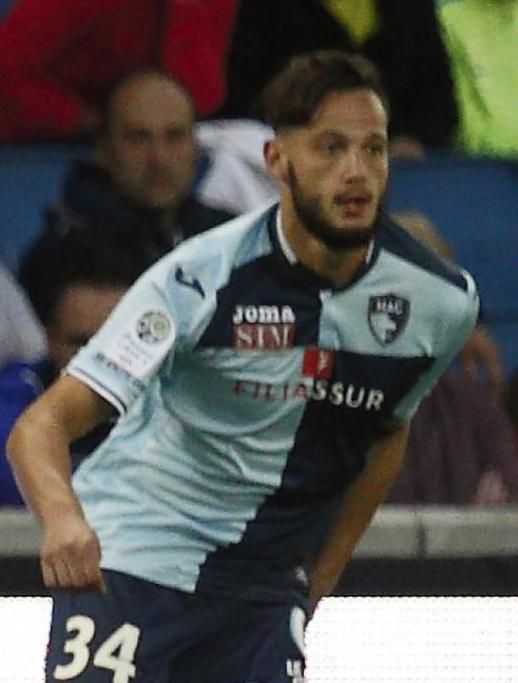

Personal information
- Date of birth: 5 February 1998 (age 28)
- Place of birth: Montivilliers, France
- Height: 1.78 m (5 ft 10 in)
- Positions: Right-back; attacking midfielder

Team information
- Current team: Balıkesirspor
- Number: 8

Youth career
- 2005–2017: Le Havre

Senior career*
Years	Team	Apps	(Gls)
2015–2019	Le Havre II	43	(0)
2017–2019	Le Havre	8	(0)
2019–2020	Yeni Malatyaspor	8	(0)
2020–2023	Denizlispor	72	(6)
2023–2024	Ankara Keçiörengücü	10	(0)
2024	→ Düzcespor (loan)	10	(0)
2024–	Balıkesirspor	8	(1)

International career
2012–2013	Turkey U15	6	(0)
2014	Turkey U16	3	(0)
2014–2015	Turkey U17	5	(0)
2015	Turkey U18	4	(0)
- * Club domestic league appearances and goals as of 3 November 2024

Özer Özdemir (born 5 February 1998) is a professional footballer who plays as a right-back for Balıkesirspor. Born in France, he represented Turkey at youth international level.

== Club career ==
Özdemir made his professional debut for Le Havre AC in a 4–1 Ligue 2 win over AJ Auxerre on 4 August 2017. On 22 November 2017, he signed his first professional contract with Auxerre for 3 seasons. On 5 July 2019, he transferred to Turkey in the Süper Lig with Yeni Malatyaspor. The following season, he transferred to the newly promoted side Denizlispor where he played as a starter.

== International career ==
Özdemir was born in France and is of Turkish descent. He is a youth international for Turkey.

== Youth career ==
- French U19 championship finalist: 2016–17
