= Mustafa Çeçenoğlu =

Turkish footballer

Personal information
- Date of birth: 12 January 1994 (age 32)
- Place of birth: Kadıköy, Turkey
- Height: 1.81 m (5 ft 11 in)
- Position: Winger

Team information
- Current team: Batman Petrolspor
- Number: 10

Youth career
- 2006–2012: Fenerbahçe
- 2012–2013: Başakşehir
- 2013–2014: Karacabey Belediyespor

Senior career*
Years	Team	Apps	(Gls)
2014–2016	Beylerbeyispor	63	(6)
2016–2019	Mamak	68	(13)
2019–2020	Menemenspor	42	(7)
2020–2021	Gençlerbirliği	6	(0)
2021	→ Boluspor (loan)	10	(1)
2021–2023	Denizlispor	60	(7)
2023–2024	Bandırmaspor	25	(2)
2024–	Batman Petrolspor	8	(1)
- * Club domestic league appearances and goals as of 26 October 2024

Mustafa Çeçenoğlu (born 12 January 1994) is a Turkish professional footballer who plays as a winger for Batman Petrolspor.

== Professional career ==
After starting his career in the amateur leagues of Turkey, Çeçenoğlu signed with Gençlerbirliği on 1 September 2020. Çeçenoğlu made his professional debut for Gençlerbirliği in a 1-0 Süper Lig win over Beşiktaş J.K. on 4 October 2020.
