= İlhan Depe =

Turkish footballer

Personal information
- Date of birth: 10 September 1992 (age 34)
- Place of birth: Bursa, Turkey
- Height: 1.72 m (5 ft 8 in)
- Position: Midfielder

Team information
- Current team: Sakaryaspor
- Number: 11

Youth career
- 2003–2005: Arabayatağı Spor
- 2005–2010: Bursaspor

Senior career*
Years	Team	Apps	(Gls)
2010–2013	Bursaspor	0	(0)
2011–2012	→ Şanlıurfaspor (loan)	20	(4)
2012–2013	→ İnegölspor (loan)	30	(4)
2013–2015	Balıkesirspor	50	(1)
2015–2018	Karabükspor	65	(1)
2018–2020	Kasımpaşa	59	(1)
2020–2021	Kayserispor	4	(0)
2021	Altay	6	(0)
2021–2022	Denizlispor	26	(3)
2022–2024	Bucaspor 1928	48	(8)
2024	1461 Trabzon	17	(6)
2024–2026	Bursaspor	60	(19)
2026–	Sakaryaspor	4	(1)

International career
2007	Turkey U15	3	(0)
2007–2008	Turkey U16	7	(0)
2010	Turkey U18	2	(1)
- * Club domestic league appearances and goals as of 1 October 2026

İlhan Depe (born 10 September 1992) is a Turkish footballer who plays for TFF 2. Lig club Sakaryaspor.

== International career ==
Depe has represented Turkey internationally on several junior levels and scored his first goal for his country in a Turkey U18 2–1 victory over Estonia U18.
