= Ömer Şişmanoğlu =

Turkish footballer

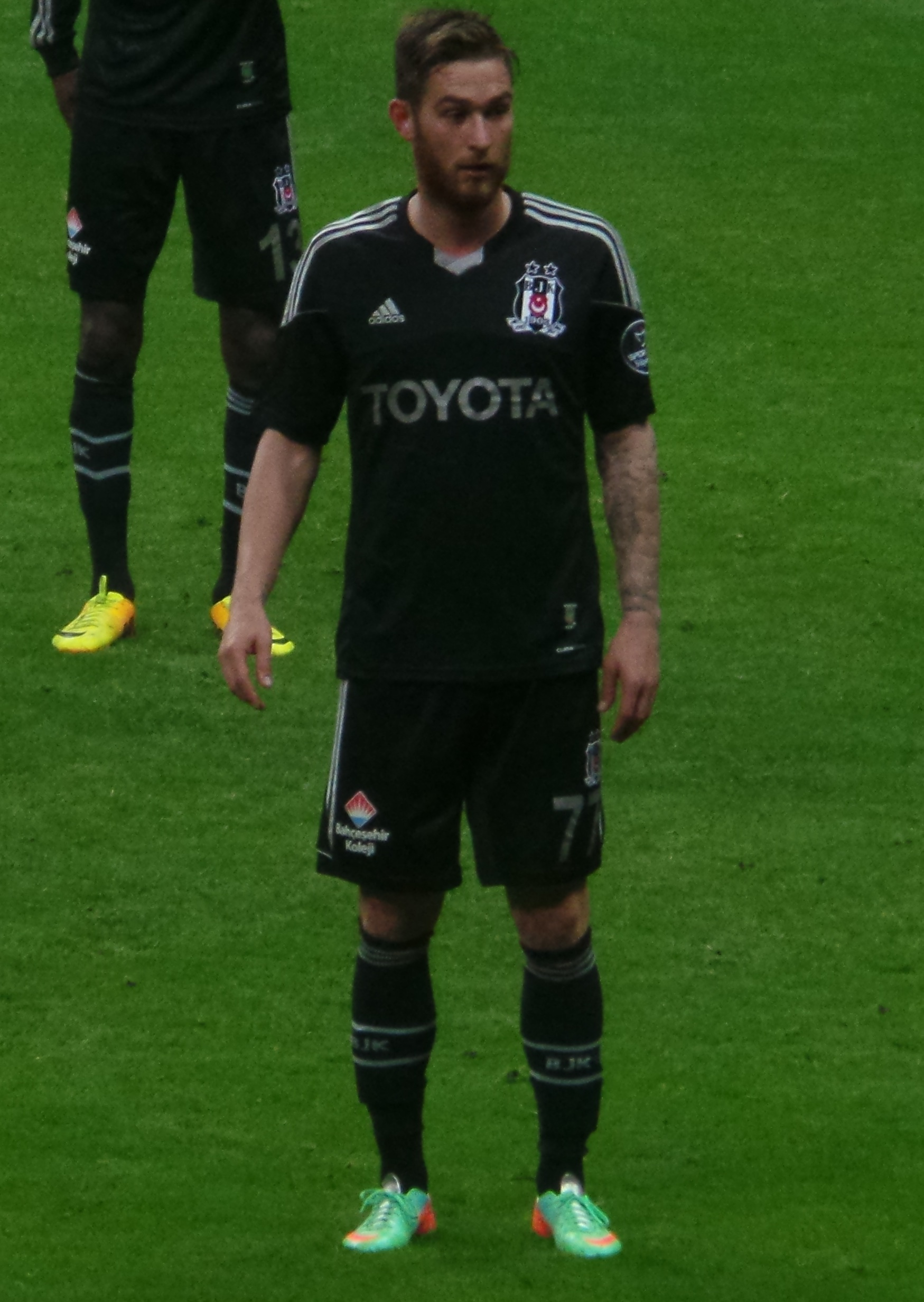

Personal information
- Full name: Ömer Hasan Şişmanoğlu
- Date of birth: 1 August 1989 (age 37)
- Place of birth: Hamburg, West Germany
- Height: 1.86 m (6 ft 1 in)
- Position: Striker

Team information
- Current team: Kırıkkale
- Number: 11

Youth career
- Hamburg Türksport
- Altona 93
- –2007: Hamburger SV

Senior career*
Years	Team	Apps	(Gls)
2007–2009	FC St. Pauli	11	(0)
2009–2012	Kayserispor	57	(9)
2012–2013	Antalyaspor	24	(8)
2013–2017	Beşiktaş	18	(4)
2014–2015	→ Eskişehirspor (loan)	22	(9)
2015	→ Konyaspor (loan)	11	(0)
2016	→ Antalyaspor (loan)	11	(6)
2017–2018	Göztepe	8	(1)
2018–2019	Yeni Malatyaspor	16	(5)
2020–2021	BB Erzurumspor	33	(5)
2021	Tuzlaspor	8	(0)
2021–2023	Denizlispor	50	(21)
2023–2025	Iğdır	24	(1)
2024	→ Bucaspor 1928 (loan)	15	(7)
2025	Sakaryaspor	13	(1)
2025–	Kırıkkale	6	(2)

International career
2009–2010	Turkey U21	6	(1)
2010–2011	Turkey A2	3	(0)
- * Club domestic league appearances and goals as of 29 November 2025

Ömer Hasan Şişmanoğlu (born 1 August 1989) is a professional footballer who plays as a striker for Turkish TFF 3. Lig club Kırıkkale. Born in Germany, he represented Turkey internationally.

Şişmanoğlu has won the Süper Lig once and the Hamburg Cup once.

== Career ==
=== Early career ===
Şişmanoğlu started his football career at SC Vatan Gücü Football Club based in Hamburg. He also played for Wilhelmsburger SV 93, FC St. Pauli, Türk Gücü Hamburg, Hamburg Türksport, and Altonaer FC von 1893. He played for the Hamburg U-19 team until the 2006–07 season.

=== FC St. Pauli ===
Şişmanoğlu joined FC St. Pauli on 1 July 2007 on a free transfer. He made his debut for FC St. Pauli in the 2. Bundesliga on 14 December 2007 against Mainz 05.

=== Kayserispor ===
On 23 June 2009, Şişmanoğlu left FC St. Pauli and signed a four-year deal with Kayserispor. He played his first match against Gençlerbirliği in August 2009. He started his first match for Kayserispor against Bursaspor on 6 December 2009. In that game, he scored his first league goal. In the 2009–10 season, he played in 25 matches and scored seven goals. The highlight of that season was the match against Bucaspor in which he scored two goals.

=== Antalyaspor ===
Şişmanoğlu moved on loan to Antalyaspor on 5 September 2012. In the 2012–13 season, he scored 14 of Antalyaspor's 29 goals in all competitions. He also scored six of those goals in five matches in the Turkish Cup. On 1 July 2013, Antalyaspor purchased Şişmanoğlu from Kayserispor for £450,000.

=== Beşiktaş ===
Five days after signing for Antalyaspor, Şişmanoğlu moved to Beşiktaş for £1.49 million. He scored on his debut for Besiktas against Eskişehirspor, which ended 1–0 in favor of Beşiktaş, on 5 October 2013.

=== Eskişehirspor ===
On 4 August 2014, Şişmanoğlu moved on loan to Eskişehirspor for the 2014–15 season. He played 22 times in the league, scoring nine goals. His first goal came on 26 October 2014 in a 4–2 loss to Mersin İdmanyurdu. His goal was the opener on the day, coming in the third minute. His side went 2–0 up, but concede once in the first half, and three times in the second.

=== Konyaspor ===
After returning from his loan to Eskisehirspor, he was loaned out again, this time to Konyaspor, on 28 August 2015. He played 11 times in the league, but never found the net. His league debut came on 27 September 2015 in a 2–0 win against Mersin İdmanyurdu. He assisted on Samuel Holmén's 85th minute doubler, having come on off the bench only 14 minutes earlier.

=== Return to Antalyaspor ===
On 18 January 2016, his loan was terminated with Konyaspor and he was sent out again on loan again to Antalyaspor. In ten league matches with his former club, the striker scored six goals.

=== Göztepe ===
On 7 August 2017, after returning from his loan to Antalyaspor, Şişmanoğlu was sold to Göztepe on a free transfer. His first league goal came on 14 October 2017 in a 3–1 away win against his former club Antalyaspor. That goal came in the 92nd minute of the match, a third for his side. It was an immediate impact, having been brought on for Adis Jahović just five minutes earlier.

== Personal life ==
Şişmanoğlu was born in the Wilhelmsburg quarter of Hamburg, West Germany. He holds German citizenship.

== Honours ==
FC St. Pauli II

- Hamburg Cup: 2007–08

Beşiktaş

- Süper Lig: 2016–17
