= Sarayköy 1926 FK =

Turkish sports club

Sarayköy 1926
- Full name: Sarayköy 1926 Futbol Kulübü
- Founded: 1981
- Ground: Doğan Seyfi Atlı Stadium, Denizli
- Capacity: 2,000
- Chairman: Rüşan Uzunoğlu
- Manager: Namık Kemal Sarıyer
- League: Denizli Super Amateur League
Home colours	Away colours

Sarayköy 1926 FK, formerly Denizli Belediyespor, is a Turkish sports club based in Denizli, Turkey. They play their home matches at Doğan Seyfi Atlı Stadium, which has a capacity of 2,000.
