= 1991–92 Turkish Cup =

Türkiye Kupası

Tournament details
- Country: Turkey
- Teams: 105

Final positions
- Champions: Trabzonspor
- Runners-up: Bursaspor

Tournament statistics
- Matches played: 105
- Goals scored: 364 (3.47 per match)
- Top goal scorer(s): Vedat Vatansever; Murat Gerger (5 goals each)

The 1991–92 Turkish Cup was the 30th edition of the tournament that determined the association football Süper Lig Turkish Cup (Turkish: Türkiye Kupası) champion under the auspices of the Turkish Football Federation (Turkish: Türkiye Futbol Federasyonu; TFF). champion under the auspices of the Turkish Football Federation (Turkish: Türkiye Futbol Federasyonu; TFF). Trabzonspor successfully contested Bursaspor on both legs of the finals. The results of the tournament also determined which clubs would be promoted or relegated.

== First round ==
| Team 1 | Score | Team 2 |
|---|---|---|
| Adana Polisgücü | 3–1 | Aksarayspor |
| Petrol Ofisi | 3–2 (aet) | İnegölspor |
| Adana Gençlerbirliği | 3–2 | İskenderunspor |
| Ayvalıkgücü | 1–0 | Altınordu |
| Bandırmaspor | 0–1 | Kocaelispor |
| Bartınspor | 2–1 | Yücespor |
| Bergamaspor | 0–1 | Yeni Turgutluspor |
| Bozüyükspor | 1–2 | Keçiörengücü |
| Bucaspor | 2–3 | Karşıyaka |
| Bulancakspor | 4–3 | Artvin Hopaspor |
| Çaykur Rizespor | 6–1 | DÇ Karabükspor |
| Çengelköy | 4–0 | Erdemir Ereğlispor |
| Çubukspor | 1–0 | Yeni Yozgatspor |
| Çanakkale Dardanel | 4–2 | Sönmez Filamentspor |
| Diyarbakırspor | 5–1 | Vanspor |
| Gaziosmanpaşa | 5–1 (aet) | Karagümrük |
| Gönenspor | 3–1 | Üsküdar Anadolu |
| Göztepe | 3–1 | İzmirspor |
| Ispartaspor | 2–1 | Alanyaspor |
| İstanbulspor | 2–1 | Galata |
| Kasımpaşa | 4–3 (aet) | Emlak Bankası Eyüpspor |
| Kayserispor | 6–1 | Kahramanmaraşspor |
| Küçükçekmecespor | 1–4 | Zeytinburnu |
| Lüleburgazspor | 2–1 | Silivrispor |
| Malatyaspor | 1–2 | Elazığspor |
| Mardinspor | 1–0 | Şanlıurfaspor |
| Marmarisspor | 3–1 | Nazillispor |
| Merzifonspor | 2–1 (aet) | Erbaaspor |
| MKE Kırıkkalespor | 1–2 | Beypazarıspor |
| Mustafakemalpaşaspor | 2–0 | Mudanyaspor |
| Siirt Köy Hizmetleri | 4–3 | Muşspor |
| Sökespor | 3–1 | Muğlaspor |
| Tarsus İdman Yurdu | 3–1 | Hatayspor |
| Tirespor | 1–0 | Seydişehir Eti Alüminyumspor |
| Şekerspor | 2–1 | PTT |
| TARİŞ | 0–1 | TKİ Tavşanlı Linyitspor |
| Yeni Salihlispor | 4–3 | Antalyaspor |
| Bafraspor | 4–1 | Ünyespor |
| Batman Belediyespor | 1–2 | Erzincanspor |

== Second round ==
| Team 1 | Score | Team 2 |
|---|---|---|
| Erzincanspor | 1–1 (4–5 p) | Mardinspor |
| Orduspor | 2–0 | Düzce Kervan Doğsanspor |
| Siirt Köy Hizmetleri | 3–0 | Elazığspor |
| Adana Gençlerbirliği | 1–3 (aet) | Adana Polisgücü |
| Bartınspor | 1–0 | Çengelköy |
| Beypazarıspor | 3–5 (aet) | Çubukspor |
| Diyarbakırspor | 0–1 | Erzurumspor |
| Eskişehirspor | 2–1 | Şekerspor |
| Keçiörengücü | 4–1 | Petrol Ofisi |
| Mersin İdman Yurdu | 2–1 (aet) | Adanaspor |
| Tarsus İdman Yurdu | 0–2 | Kayserispor |
| Bafraspor | 4–1 | Çaykur Rizespor |
| Denizlispor | 1–0 (aet) | Yeni Salihlispor |
| Gaziosmanpaşa | 1–2 | Kartalspor |
| Gönenspor | 3–6 | Yalovaspor |
| Göztepe | 1–2 | Ayvalıkgücü |
| İstanbulspor | 4–2 (aet) | Lüleburgazspor |
| Kasımpaşa | 0–2 | Zeytinburnuspor |
| Manisaspor | 0–3 | Karşıyaka |
| Marmarisspor | 2–2 (3–4 p) | Tirespor |
| Mustafakemalpaşaspor | 4–1 | Çanakkale Dardanel |
| Sökespor | 1–0 | Ispartaspor |
| Yeni Turgutluspor | 2–1 | TKİ Tavşanlı Linyitspor |
| Kocaelispor | 1–0 | Sakaryaspor |

== Third round ==
| Team 1 | Score | Team 2 |
|---|---|---|
| Orduspor | 0–1 | Bafraspor |
| Siirt Köy Hizmetleri | 1–0 | Erzurumspor |
| Adana Polisgücü | 2–1 | Mardinspor |
| Çubukspor | 2–1 | Bartınspor |
| Eskişehirspor | 4–1 | Keçiörengücü |
| Kayserispor | 2–1 | Mersin İdman Yurdu |
| Denizlispor | 5–1 | Sökespor |
| İstanbulspor | 2–0 (aet) | Mustafakemalpaşaspor |
| Karşıyaka | 3–2 | Ayvalıkgücü |
| Tirespor | 4–2 (aet) | Yeni Turgutluspor |
| Yalovaspor | 3–3 (3–5 p) | Kocaelispor |
| Zeytinburnu | 0–2 | Kartalspor |

== Fourth round ==
| Team 1 | Score | Team 2 |
|---|---|---|
| Çubukspor | 2–0 | Adana Polisgücü |
| Denizlispor | 2–2 (4–3 p) | Karşıyaka |
| Eskişehirspor | 3–0 | Bafraspor |
| İstanbulspor | 3–1 | Tirespor |
| Siirt Köy Hizmetleri | 0–1 | Kayserispor |
| Kocaelispor | 1–0 | Kartalspor |

== Fifth round ==
| Team 1 | Score | Team 2 |
|---|---|---|
| Eskişehirspor | 4–2 | Adana Demirspor |
| Bulancakspor | 1–2 | Bakırköyspor |
| Bursaspor | 2–0 | Boluspor |
| Gaziantepspor | 4–5 (aet) | Kayserispor |
| İstanbulspor | 1–1 (2–1 p) | Denizlispor |
| Kocaelispor | 2–0 (aet) | Çubukspor |
| Merzifonspor | 1–3 | Altay |
| Samsunspor | 3–1 | Konyaspor |

== Sixth round ==
| Team 1 | Score | Team 2 |
|---|---|---|
| Bakırköyspor | 2–2 (3–4 p) | Galatasaray |
| Beşiktaş | 3–1 | Samsunspor |
| İstanbulspor | 0–1 (aet) | Aydınspor |
| Kayserispor | 1–2 | Gençlerbirliği |
| Ankaragücü | 0–1 (aet) | Bursaspor |
| Sarıyer | 0–2 | Altay |
| Trabzonspor | 1–0 | Eskişehirspor |
| Kocaelispor | 1–0 | Fenerbahçe |

== Quarter-finals ==
| Team 1 | Score | Team 2 |
|---|---|---|
| Trabzonspor | 2–1 (aet) | Galatasaray |
| Beşiktaş | 1–0 | Aydınspor |
| Altay | 2–5 | Bursaspor |
| Kocaelispor | 2–0 | Gençlerbirliği |

== Semi-finals ==
=== Summary table ===
| Team 1 | Score | Team 2 |
|---|---|---|
| Kocaelispor | 0–1 | Bursaspor |
| Trabzonspor | 2–1 | Beşiktaş |

=== Matches ===
| 15 April 1992 Semi-final | Kocaelispor | 0–1 | Bursaspor | İzmit |
| 14:00 EEST (UTC+03) | | | Ali Nail 11' | Stadium: İsmet Paşa Stadium; Referee: Oğuz Sarvan |

| 15 April 1992 Semi-final | Trabzonspor | 2–1 | Beşiktaş | Samsun (Note: Trabzonspor was given a two-match pitch closure penalty due to the incidents that occurred during the Trabzonspor-Fenerbahçe match played on March 28, 1992. The second pitch closure penalty was applied in this match.) |
| 14:00 EEST (UTC+03) | Cyzio 40'; Hami 86' | | Mehmet 65' | Stadium: Samsun 19 Mayıs Stadium; Referee: Hasan Ceylan |

== Final ==
=== 1st leg ===
| 22 April 1992 Final | Bursaspor | 3–0 | Trabzonspor | Bursa, Turkey |
| 15:00 EEST (UTC+03) | Gabriel 27'; Hakan 56'; Ali Nail 89' (pen.) | | | Stadium: Bursa Atatürk Stadium; Referee: Serdar Çakman |

=== 2nd leg ===
| 29 April 1992 Final | Trabzonspor | 5–1 | Bursaspor | Trabzon, Turkey |
| 14:00 EEST (UTC+03) | Soner 1'; Hami 36' (pen.); Taner 49' (o.g.); Hamdi 60'; Şeyhmuz 86' | | Vedat 14' | Stadium: Hüseyin Avni Aker Stadium; Referee: Bülent Yavuz |
