= List of football clubs in Turkey =

For a complete list see Category:Football clubs in Turkey.

This is a list of association football clubs in Turkey. Clubs currently in the first three tiers of the Turkish football league system are listed alphabetically.

== Alphabetical team listing ==
Club	City	Province	Region	League	Level
1461 Trabzon	Trabzon	Trabzon	Black Sea	TFF Second League	3
68 Aksaray Belediyespor	Aksaray	Aksaray	Central Anatolia	TFF Second League	3
24 Erzincanspor	Erzincan	Erzincan	Eastern Anatolia	TFF Second League	3
Adana Demirspor	Adana	Adana	Mediterranean	Süper Lig	1
Adanaspor	Adana	Adana	Mediterranean	TFF First League	2
Afjet Afyonspor	Afyonkarahisar	Afyonkarahisar	Aegean	TFF Second League	3
Alanyaspor	Alanya	Antalya	Mediterranean	Süper Lig	1
Altay	İzmir	İzmir	Aegean	TFF Second League	3
Altınordu	İzmir	İzmir	Aegean	TFF Second League	3
Amed	Diyarbakır	Diyarbakır	Southeastern Anatolia	TFF First League	2
Ankara Demirspor	Ankara	Ankara	Central Anatolia	TFF Second League	3
Ankaragücü	Ankara	Ankara	Central Anatolia	TFF First League	2
Ankara Keçiörengücü	Ankara	Ankara	Central Anatolia	TFF First League	2
Ankaraspor	Ankara	Ankara	Central Anatolia	TFF Second League	3
Antalyaspor	Antalya	Antalya	Mediterranean	Süper Lig	1
Arnavutköy Belediyespor	Arnavutköy	Istanbul	Marmara	TFF Second League	3
Bodrum	Bodrum	Muğla	Aegean	Süper Lig	1
Bucaspor 1928	Buca	İzmir	Aegean	TFF Second League	3
Bandırmaspor	Bandırma	Balıkesir	Marmara	TFF First League	2
Belediye Derincespor	Derince	Kocaeli	Marmara	TFF Second League	3
Beşiktaş	Istanbul (Beşiktaş)	Istanbul	Marmara	Süper Lig	1
Beyoğlu Yeni Çarşı	Istanbul (Beyoğlu)	Istanbul	Marmara	TFF Second League	3
Boluspor	Bolu	Bolu	Black Sea	TFF First League	2
Çaykur Rizespor	Rize	Rize	Black Sea	Süper Lig	1
Çorum FK	Çorum	Çorum	Black Sea	TFF First League	2
Diyarbekirspor	Diyarbakır	Diyarbakır	Southeastern Anatolia	TFF Second League	3
Elazığspor	Elazığ	Elazığ	Eastern Anatolia	TFF Second League	3
Erzurumspor	Erzurum	Erzurum	Eastern Anatolia	TFF First League	2
Esenler Erokspor	Istanbul (Esenler)	Istanbul	Marmara	TFF First League	2
Eyüpspor	Istanbul (Eyüp)	Istanbul	Marmara	Süper Lig	1
Fatih Karagümrük	Istanbul (Fatih)	Istanbul	Marmara	TFF First League	2
Fenerbahçe	Istanbul (Kadıköy)	Istanbul	Marmara	Süper Lig	1
Fethiyespor	Fethiye	Muğla	Aegean	TFF Second League	3
Galatasaray	Istanbul (Şişli)	Istanbul	Marmara	Süper Lig	1
Gaziantep F.K.	Gaziantep	Gaziantep	Southeastern Anatolia	Süper Lig	1
Gençlerbirliği	Ankara	Ankara	Central Anatolia	TFF First League	2
Giresunspor	Giresun	Giresun	Black Sea	TFF Second League	3
Göztepe	İzmir	İzmir	Aegean	Süper Lig	1
Hatayspor	Antakya	Hatay	Mediterranean	Süper Lig	1
Iğdır F.K.	Iğdır	Iğdır	Eastern Anatolia	TFF First League	2
İnegölspor	İnegöl	Bursa	Marmara	TFF Second League	3
İskenderunspor	İskenderun	Hatay	Mediterranean	TFF Second League	3
Isparta 32 SK	Isparta	Isparta	Mediterranean	TFF Second League	3
İstanbul Başakşehir	Istanbul (Başakşehir)	Istanbul	Marmara	Süper Lig	1
İstanbulspor	Istanbul (Büyükçekmece)	Istanbul	Marmara	TFF First League	2
Karacabey Belediyespor	Karacabey	Bursa	Marmara	TFF Second League	3
Karaman FK	Karaman	Karaman	Central Anatolia	TFF Second League	3
Kasımpaşa	Istanbul (Beyoğlu)	Istanbul	Marmara	Süper Lig	1
Kastamonuspor 1966	Kastamonu	Kastamonu	Black Sea	TFF Second League	3
Kayserispor	Kayseri	Kayseri	Central Anatolia	Süper Lig	1
Kırklarelispor	Kırklareli	Kırklareli	Marmara	TFF Second League	3
Kocaelispor	İzmit	Kocaeli	Marmara	TFF First League	2
Konyaspor	Konya	Konya	Central Anatolia	Süper Lig	1
Manisa FK	Manisa	Manisa	Aegean	TFF First League	2
Menemen	Menemen	İzmir	Aegean	TFF Second League	3
Nazilli Belediyespor	Nazilli	Aydın	Aegean	TFF Second League	3
Pendikspor	Istanbul (Pendik)	Istanbul	Marmara	TFF First League	2
Sakaryaspor	Adapazarı	Sakarya	Marmara	TFF First League	2
Samsunspor	Samsun	Samsun	Black Sea	Süper Lig	1
Şanlıurfaspor	Şanlıurfa	Şanlıurfa	Southeastern Anatolia	TFF First League	2
Sarıyer	Istanbul (Sarıyer)	Istanbul	Marmara	TFF Second League	3
Serik Belediyespor	Serik	Antalya	Mediterranean	TFF Second League	3
Sivasspor	Sivas	Sivas	Central Anatolia	Süper Lig	1
Somaspor	Soma	Manisa	Aegean	TFF Second League	3
Trabzonspor	Trabzon	Trabzon	Black Sea	Süper Lig	1
Tuzlaspor	Istanbul (Tuzla)	Istanbul	Marmara	TFF Second League	3
Ümraniyespor	Istanbul (Ümraniye)	Istanbul	Marmara	TFF First League	2
Vanspor FK	Van	Van	Eastern Anatolia	TFF Second League	3
Yeni Malatyaspor	Malatya	Malatya	Eastern Anatolia	TFF First League	2
Yeni Mersin İdmanyurdu	Mersin	Mersin	Mediterranean	TFF Second League	3

== TFF Third League ==
- Group 1: 1877 Alemdağspor, 52 Orduspor, Artvin Hopaspor, Çankaya FK, Diyarbakırspor, Edirnespor, Fatsa Belediyespor, Kemerspor 2003, Kızılcabölükspor, Malatya Yeşilyurt Belediyespor, Nevşehir Belediyespor, Ofspor, Payasspor, Etimesgut Belediyespor, Zonguldak Kömürspor
- Group 2: Ağrı 1970 SK, Belediye Kütahyaspor, Büyükçekmece Tepecikspor, Çengelköy SK, Ceyhanspor, Darıca Gençlerbirliği, Halide Edip Adıvar SK, Kahta 02 Spor, Mardin Fosfatspor, Tekirdağspor, Tokatspor, Yomraspor, Yozgatspor 1959 FK, Düzcespor, Kırşehir Futbol SK
- Group 3: Altındağspor, Arhavispor, Batman Petrolspor, Çarşambaspor, Çatalcaspor, Cizrespor, 23 Elazığ FK, Erbaaspor, Gölcükspor, Karşıyaka, Osmaniyespor FK, Şile Yıldızspor, Yalovaspor, Denizlispor, Bursaspor
- Group 4: 1954 Kelkit Belediyespor, Alanya Kestelspor, Bayrampaşa, Bergama Belediyespor, Bursa Yıldırımspor, Karaköprü Belediyespor, Kırıkkale Büyük Anadoluspor, Kozanspor, Modafen, Muğlaspor, Silivrispor, Sultanbeyli Belediyespor, Nilüfer Belediye FK, Orduspor 1967, Turgutluspor, Uşakspor, Adıyaman

== Regional and Amateur Clubs ==
- 100. Yıl Yiğitlerspor
- 1074 Çankırıspor
- 12 Bingölspor
- 1453 Fatih Gençlik ve Spor Kulübü
- 1461 Trabzon
- 1920 Maraşspor
- 1923 Esenkentspor
- 1925 Gençlikspor
- 1925 Manavkuyu Gençlikspor
- 1930 Bafraspor
- 1955 Batman Belediyespor
- 44 Malatyaspor
- 5 Temmuz İskenderunspor
- 68 Yeni Aksarayspor
- 72 Batmanspor
- Ackakoy
- Acıpayam Gençlikspor
- Adalarspor
- Adapazarıspor
- Adıyaman İl Özel İdarespor
- Adıyamanspor
- Afyon İscehisarspor
- Ağaspor
- Akçaabat Sebatspor
- Akçakocaspor
- Ak İnşaat Sanayispor
- Aksaray Sanayispor
- Akşehirspor
- Alaplı Beldiyespor
- Alaşehir Belediyespor
- Albayrakspor
- Aliağa FK
- Alibeyköyspor
- Alibeyköy Parsellerspor
- Altınordu Belediyespor
- Altınova Belediyespor
- Altıntepsispor
- Amasyaspor 1968 FK
- Anadolu Hisarı İdmanyurdu
- Anadolu Üniversitesi SK
- Anadolu Üsküdarspor
- Anamur Belediyespor
- Ankara TKİ Spor
- Ankara Türkiye Kömür İşletmeleri
- Ankara Yurtkurspor
- Ankas İstiklalspor
- Antalya Demrespor
- Araban Belediyespor
- Araklıspor
- Arakli 1961 Spor
- Arapgirspor
- Arguvan Belediyespor
- Arifiye Kalaycıspor
- Armutlu Belediyespor
- Arnavutköyspor
- Arsinspor
- Arslanağız Teknikspor
- Arsuz Karaağaçspor
- Aslantepespor
- Aşağıkızılcaspor
- Atakum Belediyespor
- Ataşehir Çamolukspor
- Atlasspor
- Atlas Yıldızspor
- Avcılarspor
- Ayazağaspor
- Ayazağa Esenspor
- Aydınspor 1923
- Aydın Yıldızspor
- Ayvalıkgücü Belediyespor
- Babaeskispor
- Bağcılar SK
- Bağcılar Güneşlispor
- Bağlarbaşıspor
- Bağlar Belediyespor
- Bahçelievlerspor
- Balatspor
- Balçovaspor
- Balçova Yaşamspor
- Balıkesir Büyükşehir Belediyespor
- Bakırköyspor
- Bandırma Etispor
- Barbarosspor
- Bartınspor
- Basmane Altınparkspor
- Başakşehir İkitelli Köyiçispor
- Başiskele Doğantepespor
- Batı Trakya Türklerispor
- Bayburt Belediyespor
- Bayburt Özel İdarespor
- Bayraklı Belediyespor
- Bayraklı Özgür F.K.
- Bayraklıspor
- Beşikdüzüspor
- Beşyüzevlerspor
- Beşirlispor
- Beştelsizspor
- Beydağspor
- Beylerbeyi S.K.
- Beylikdüzüspor
- Beykoy Belediyespor
- Beykoz 1908 S.K.D.
- Beyoğlu S.K.
- Beyoğlu Yeniçarşıspor
- Biga Adaspor
- Bigadiç Belediyespor
- Bigaspor
- Bilecikspor
- Birecik Belediyespor
- Bismil 21 Sportif Faaliyetler
- Bitlis Özgüzelderespor
- Bölmespor
- Bolvadin Belediyespor
- Bornova Altınyıldızspor
- Bornova Ataspor
- Bornova Belediyespor
- Bornova Doğanlarspor
- Bornova Evka 3 Spor
- Bornova Hitabspor
- Bornova Mevlana Gençlikspor
- Bornovaspor Futbol Kulübü
- Bostanlıspor
- Boyabat 1868 Spor
- Bozcaadaspor
- Bozüyükspor
- Bozüyük Vitraspor
- Bozyaka
- Buca Belediyespor
- Bucak Belediye Oğuzhanspor
- Bulancak Belediyespor
- Bulancakspor
- Bursa Zaferspor
- Büyükçekmece Belediyespor
- Büyükçekmece Mimarobaspor
- Büyükderespor
- Çağlayan Gençlerbirliği
- Çakmakspor
- Çal Belediyespor
- Çamdibi Debre Gençlikspor
- Çamdibi Gençlerbirliği
- Çamdibi İdmanyurdu
- Çamdibispor
- Çamdibi Yavuzspor
- Çamlıcaspor
- Çanakkale Dardanelspor
- Çanakçaspor
- Çandarlı Belediyespor
- Çankırıspor
- Cankurtaranspor
- Çapaspor
- Çatalhüyük Çumra Belediyespor
- Çavuşbaşıspor
- Çaycumaspor
- Çayelispor
- Çayırbaşıspor
- Çayırovaspor
- Çekmeköy Belediyesi Alemdağspor
- Çeliktepespor
- Çerkezköyspor
- Çerkezköy 1911 Doğanspor
- Cevizli Anadoluspor
- Cevizlispor
- Çiğdemspor
- Çiğli Belediyespor
- Çiğli Esentepespor
- Çiğli Maltepe
- Çıksalınspor
- Çilimli Belediyespor
- Çine Madranspor
- Cizre Basraspor
- Cizre Serhatspor
- Çorluspor
- Çorumspor
- Çubukspor Futbol AŞ
- Cubukluspor
- Cukucayir Belde
- Cumhuriyet Üniversitesi SK
- Damlacık Yaylaspor
- Davutpaşaspor
- Değirmenköyspor
- Denizli İl Özel İdarespor
- Derincespor
- Dersimspor
- Devlet Su İşleri Karadenizspor
- Devrek Belediyespor
- Didim Belediyespor
- Dikilitaşspor
- Diyarbakır Yolspor
- Dolayobaspor
- Dudulluspor
- Dumlupınarspor
- Edremit Belediyespor
- Efeler 09
- Efelergücü
- Ege Çağlayanspor
- Ege Üniversitesi
- Elazığ İl Özel İdarespor
- Elazığ Yolspor
- Elbistan Belediyespor
- Elmalıspor
- Elmasbahçelerspor
- Emiralem Belediyespor
- Emirdağspor
- Erbaa Güreş İhtisasspor
- Erdekspor
- Erdemli Belediyespor
- Erenköy Acarspor
- Erenlerspor
- Erganispor
- Eroğluspor
- Erzincan Ulalarspor
- Eşmekaya Belediye Gençlikspor
- Esenlerspor
- Esenyalıspor
- Eskişehir Demirspor
- Eskişehir Sağlıkspor
- Eskişehir Yunusemrespor
- Eşrefpaşa
- Eşrefpaşaspor
- Evka 5 Spor
- Eynesil Belediyespor
- Ezinespor
- Fatsa Dolunayspor
- Fatsa Yaşamspor
- Fenerspor
- Ferahevlerspor
- Feriköy S.K.
- Filizspor
- Fırat Üniversitesi SK
- Foça Belediyespor
- Gayretspor
- Gazi Mahallesi
- Gaziantep Ankasspor
- Gaziantep Kalespor
- Gaziantepspor
- Gaziemir Gençlerbirliği
- Gaziemir Onurspor
- Gaziemir Sarnıç Gençlikspor
- Gaziosmanpaşaspor
- Gebzespor
- Geliboluspor
- Girmeli Belediyespor
- Girne Gençlikspor
- Gökçeadaspor
- Gölbaşı Belediyespor
- Göle Belediyespor
- Gönen Belediyespor
- Görelespor
- Görükle İpekspor
- Göynük Belediyespor
- Gülbahçespor
- Gülsuyuspor
- Gültepespor
- Gümüldürspor
- Gümüşçayspor
- Gümüşorduspor
- Gümüşsuyuspor
- Gümüşyakaspor
- Günyamaçspor
- Gürselspor
- Güzeltepe
- Güzelhisarspor
- Güzelyalı S.K.
- Hacırahmanlıspor
- Haçka SK
- Hallbeyllspor
- Hastanebayırı GSK
- Haydarspor
- Haymana Belediyespor
- Hekimoglu Doganspor
- Hendekspor
- Hoçvanspor
- Hürriyetgücüspor
- İçerenköy İY
- İdealtepespor
- İdmangücü
- İdmanyurdu 1925 Spor
- Iğdırspor
- Iğdır Esspor
- Igdir Aras Spor
- İkitellispor
- İlkadım Belediyespor
- İlimtepe Kullar 1975 Spor
- İncirliova Belediyespor
- İnegöl Gençler Gücüspor
- Irmakspor
- İskenderun Belediye Gençlikspor
- İskilip Belediyesi Gençlik Ve Spor
- İsmetiyespor
- Isparta Davraz Spor
- Ispartaspor
- İstanbul 25 Çatspor
- İstanbul Bafraspor
- İstanbul Balkanspor
- İstanbul Bayburtspor
- İstanbul Bulancakspor
- İstanbul Demirspor
- İstanbul Emniyetspor
- İstanbul Güngörenspor
- İstanbul Kayaşehirspor
- İstanbul Kastamonuspor
- İstanbul Kolejispor
- İstanbul Mesudiyespor
- İstanbul Sahilspor
- İstanbul Siirtgücüspor
- İstasyonspor
- İzmir 35 F.K.
- İzmir Altınay Ceylanspor
- İzmir Altınırmak
- İzmir Ansızca Zaferspor
- İzmir Armutluspor
- İzmir Asarlık Gençlerbirliği
- İzmir Asarlık Gençlikspor
- İzmir Ayrancılar Gençlikspor
- İzmir Ataşehir Mahallesi
- İzmir Bahçelievlerspor
- İzmir Büyükşehir Belediyespor
- İzmir Cennetçeme 1990
- İzmir Çakmaklıspor
- İzmir Çamkulespor
- İzmir Çaymahalle Yeniköprü
- İzmir Çayırlıbahçe
- İzmir Çırpı Doğanspor
- İzmir Dedebaşıspor
- İzmir Denizspor
- İzmir Demirspor
- İzmir Dostgücü
- İzmir Erdem Esentepe
- İzmir Fırat Seyhangücü
- İzmir Genç Manisalılarspor
- İzmir Gerenköyspor
- İzmir Gökovaspor
- İzmir Hücumspor
- İzmir Işıkkentgücü
- İzmir Işıkspor
- İzmir İşçievlerispor
- İzmir Kahramanlarspor
- İzmir Kozağaçspor
- İzmir Koyundere Gençlikspor
- İzmir Küçük Çiğli Gençlikspor
- İzmir Küçük Çiğli Yenimahalle
- İzmir Mersinli Şimşekspor
- İzmir Mesev Gençlikspor
- İzmir Mevlana Konurcaspor
- İzmir Mevlanaspor
- İzmir Onur Gençlikspor
- İzmir Örengücü
- İzmir Parsaspor
- İzmir Pınargücü
- İzmir Reo Atillaspor
- İzmir Sinancılarspor
- İzmirspor
- İzmir Sütçülerspor
- İzmir TEK
- İzmir Türkelli Spor
- İzmir Ulucakspor
- izmir Ulukent Gençlikspor
- İzmir Yahşelli Gençlikspor
- İzmir Yeni Bağarasıspor
- İzmir Yeşilçamspor
- İzmir Yeşiltepespor
- İzmir Yılmazkayaspor
- İzmir Yolspor
- İzmit Belediyespor
- Kabadüz Belediyespor
- Kadimspor
- Kağıthanespor
- Kahta Diriliş Spor
- Kalkanderespor
- Kanalizasyon İdaresispor
- Kanaryaspor
- Kapadokya Göremespor
- Kapaklıspor
- Karaağaçspor
- Karabağlar Cennetçeşmespor
- Karabağlar Gençyıldızspor
- Karabağlar F.K.
- Karabağlarspor
- Karabekirspor
- Karabiga Belediyesi GSK
- Karadeniz Ereğli Belediyespor
- Karamürselspor
- Karapınar Belediyespor
- Karasuspor
- Karsspor
- Kars 36 Spor
- Karşıyaka Demirköprü
- Karşıyaka Gümüşpalaspor
- Karşıyaka Kültürspor
- Karşıyaka Soğukkuyuspor
- Kartal Bulvarspor
- Kartalgücüspor
- Kartalspor
- Kartaltepespor
- Kastamonu Özel İdare Köy Hizmetlerispor
- Kavacıkspor
- Kavakpınarspor
- Kaynarcaspor
- Kayseri Emar Grup FK
- Kayseri Yolspor
- Keçiören Bağlumspor
- Kelesspor
- Kemahspor
- Kemalpaşa Örnekköyspor
- Kemalpaşaspor
- Kemalpaşa 1923 Spor
- Kemerburgazspor
- Kepezspor
- Kepez Belediyespor
- Kestel Belediyespor
- Keşanspor
- Kilimli Belediyespor
- Kilis Belediyespor
- Kınık Belediyespor
- Kırıkhanspor
- Kırıkkalespor
- Kırıkkale Büyük Anadolu
- Kırklareli Kavaklıspor
- Kiremithanespor
- Kırşehirspor
- Konak Belediyespor
- Konya Ereğlispor
- Körfez Belediyesi Hereke Yıldızspor
- Körfez İskenderunspor
- Körfez SK
- Kotyora FK
- Koyu SK
- Kozlu Belediyespor
- Küçükayasofyaspor
- Küçükçekmecespor
- Küçükçekmece İdmanyurdu SK
- Küçükçekmece Tokat Bereketlispor
- Küçükköyspor
- Küçükkuyu Gençlerbirliği
- Küçükpazar SK
- Küçükyalı Yelkenspor
- Kumburgazspor
- Kumluca Belediyespor
- Kurtalanspor
- Kuruçeşmespor
- Kuştepespor
- Kütahya Özel İdare Köy Hizmetlerispor
- Kütahya Sera Şekerspor
- Ladik Belediyespor
- Lapsekispor
- Leventspor
- Lüleburgazspor
- Mahallesispor
- Mahmutbeyspor
- Mahmutşevketpaşa
- Malatya İl Özel İdaresispor
- Malatyaspor
- Malatya İdman Yurdu
- Malkoçoğluspor
- Maltepespor
- Mamakspor
- Manavgat Belediyespor
- Manavgatspor
- Manisaspor
- Manisa Sanayispor
- Marmaris Belediye GSK
- Mavişehir 79 Yıldızspor
- Mecidiyeköyspor
- Mehmet Akif Ersoy Üniversitesi Gençlikspor
- Menderes Belediyesi Eğitim Kültür Spor
- Menderes Belediyesi Özderespor
- Menemen Gençlikspor
- Menemen Maltepebelediye Spor
- Merterspor
- Mersin FK
- Merzifonspor
- Mevlanaspor
- Mezitlispor
- Moymulspor
- Mucur Yabanlıspor
- Mudurnuspor
- Muratlıspor
- Muratpaşa Belediyesi Spor Kulübü
- Muratpaşaspor
- Muş 1984
- Muş Menderesspor
- Mus Ovasispor
- Mustafakemalpaşaspor
- Naldökengücü
- Naldökenspor
- Nergizspor
- Neslişahspor
- Nevsehirspor Genclik
- Niksar Belediyespor
- Nişantaşıspor
- Nizipspor
- Ödemisspor
- Okspor
- Orduspor
- Ordu Demirspor
- Orhangazi Belediyespor
- Orhanlıspor
- Ortaca Belediyespor
- Ortaköyspor
- Ortaçeşmespor
- Ortadağspor
- Osmancık Belediyespor
- Osmaniyespor
- Öz Espiye Belediyespor
- Ozkandiblspor
- Pamukova 1968 Spor
- Paşabahçespor
- Patnos Gençlikspor
- Patnos 04 Spor
- Pendik Çamlıkspor
- Pendik Güllübağlarspor
- Perşembespor
- Piyalepaşaspor
- Poyrakikspor
- Pozantı Gençlikspor
- Pütürge Belediyespor
- Ramispor
- Resitpasaspor
- Reyhanlı Belediyespor
- Rumelispor
- Şafakspor
- Safranboluspor
- Şahinbey Belediye Gençlik Ve Spor
- Sakinşehir Seferihisarspor
- Salihli Belediyespor
- Sancaktepespor
- Sandıklıspor
- Sapanbağlarıspor
- Sapanca Gençlikspor
- Sarayköy 1926 FK
- Sarayköyspor
- Sarayönü Belediyespor
- Salarhaspor
- Şarkışla Belediyespor
- Sefaköyspor
- Şehit Kamil Belediyespor
- Şehreminispor
- Şehzadebaşıspor
- Sekbanlarspor
- Selçuk Efesspor
- Selimiyespor
- Selimpaşaspor
- Şemiklerspor
- Serdivanspor
- Serhat Ardahanspor
- Seyrek Belediyespor
- Siirt İl Özel İdaresispor
- Şilespor
- Silifke Belediyespor
- Sincan Belediyespor
- Sinopspor
- Şirintepespor
- Şişli Gençlikspor
- Sisli Sanaylspor
- Şişli Yaylaspor
- Sitespor
- Siverek Belediyespor
- Söğütlüçeşmespor
- Söğütlüçeşme Birlikspor
- Soğuksuspor
- Sökespor
- Sorgun Belediyespor
- Soyaspor Gençlik
- Suadiye Belediyespor
- Sultanbeyli Belediyespor
- Sultangazispor
- Sultanmuratspor
- Sürmenespor
- Sürsürüspor
- Sütlücespor
- Suvermez Kapadokyaspor
- Taksim S.K.
- Talasgücü Belediyespor
- Tashnagspor
- Taşlıtarlaspor
- Tatvan
- Telsizspor
- Tire 2021 FK
- Tire Belediyespor
- Tire Genç 1970 Spor
- TKİ Soma Linyitspor
- TKİ Tavşanlı Linyitspor
- Tonya Doğanspor
- Topkapıspor
- Torbalıspor
- Toroslar Belediyespor
- Torul Belediyespor
- Tozkoparan Birlikspor
- Trabzon DSİ
- Trabzon Faroz Gençlikspor
- Tunaspor
- Tunusbağıspor
- Turanspor
- Türkoğlu Belediyespor
- Türk Telekom GSK
- Tüysüzspor
- Tuzla Şifaspor
- Ulalar Belediyesi Gençlikspor
- Ulubey Belediyespor
- Urla Gençlik Spor
- Ülküspor
- Ümitspor
- Ümraniye Hekimbaşıspor
- Ünye 1957 Spor
- Ünye Gençlerbirliği
- Üsküdar Anadolu S.K.
- Üsküdar Belediyespor
- Uzunköprüspor
- Vakıflar Güvenspor
- Van İpekyoluspor
- Van Yolspor
- Vefa S.K.
- Vizespor
- Yahyalıspor
- Yahya Kemalspor
- Yakacıkspor
- Yakutiyespor
- Yalova Kadıköyspor
- Yalvaçspor
- Yamanlar Esenspor
- Yatağanspor
- Yaylacık Gençlikspor
- Yedikulespor
- Yelkispor
- Yenibosna S.K.
- Yeni Bornovaspor
- Yeni Camdibi
- Yeni Çanspor
- Yenidoğanspor
- Yeni Doğançayspor
- Yeni Ereğlispor
- Yeni Evka 4 Spor
- Yeni Milasspor
- Yeni Örnekköyspor
- Yeni Özkartalspor
- Yeni Pelitli
- Yeni Salihlispor
- Yeni Ufukspor
- Yeniköyspor
- Yenişehir Belediyespor
- Yenişehir Kartallarını
- Yeşil Bursa A.Ş.
- Yeşil Esenyurtspor
- Yeşildirek S.K.
- Yeşilkentspor
- Yeşilköyspor
- Yeşilovaspor
- Yeşilova Esnafspor
- Yeşiltepespor
- Yıldırım Belediyespor
- Yıldızeli Birlikspor
- Yücespor
- Yukarıkızılca Acarspor
- Yüksekova Belediyespor
- Yumurtalık Belediyespor
- Yunus Emre Belediyespor
- Zara Belediyespor
- Zeytinburnuspor
- Zeytinburnu Yıldızspor
- Z.H.K. Çamdibi Altınokspor
- Zübeyde Hanım Mahallesi Elitspor

== See also ==
- List of women's football clubs in Turkey
