= 2007–08 TFF 2. Lig =

- Season: 2007–08
- Champions: Adanaspor
- Promoted: Adanaspor; Karabükspor; Güngören Belediyespor (play-off)
- Relegated: 1st group İnegölspor, Fatih Karagümrük; 2nd group İzmirspor, Uşakspor; 3rd group Küçükköyspor, Tepecik Belediyespor; 4th group Araklıspor, Erzincanspor; 5th group Kahramanmaraşspor, Hatayspor
- Matches: 816
- Top goalscorer: Yunus Altun (Etimesgut Şekerspor) (16)

The 2007–08 TFF Second League season.

== Promotion Group ==
=== Table ===
Pos	Team	Pld	W	D	L	GF	GA	GD	Pts	Promotion or qualification
1	Adanaspor	18	11	2	5	31	21	+10	35	Promotion to TFF First League
2	Karabükspor	18	10	4	4	28	12	+16	34	Promotion to TFF First League
3	Adana Demirspor	18	10	3	5	27	19	+8	33	Qualification for Promotion play-offs
4	Etimesgut Şekerspor	18	9	3	6	27	20	+7	30	Qualification for Promotion play-offs
5	Gaziosmanpaşaspor	18	8	3	7	13	19	−6	27	Qualification for Promotion play-offs
6	Mersin İdman Yurdu	18	6	5	7	18	19	−1	23	
7	Erzurumspor	18	6	1	11	15	29	−14	19	
8	Tarsus İdman Yurdu	18	4	5	9	18	23	−5	17	
9	Çanakkale Dardanelspor	18	4	5	9	12	19	−7	17	
10	Pendikspor	18	3	7	8	21	29	−8	16	

=== Results ===
Home \ Away	ADN	ADM	ÇAN	ERZ	ŞEK	GOP	KAR	MİY	PEN	TİY
Adanaspor		1–0	1–1	3–1	1–2	4–1	3–2	3–2	4–2	2–1
Adana Demirspor	1–0		2–0	4–2	3–2	4–1	1–0	0–0	1–4	1–0
Çanakkale Dardanelspor	1–1	0–1		2–0	1–0	0–0	0–1	0–1	4–0	0–3
Erzurumspor	0–1	1–0	0–1		0–0	0–1	3–1	1–2	1–0	2–1
Etimesgut Şekerspor	3–1	2–2	3–1	1–2		2–0	0–2	3–2	1–1	1–0
Gaziosmanpaşaspor	1–0	0–1	1–0	1–0	1–0		0–1	0–0	2–1	1–0
Karabükspor	1–2	1–0	1–1	7–0	1–0	1–0		4–0	2–0	0–0
Mersin İdman Yurdu	0–2	2–1	3–0	2–0	0–1	0–1	0–1		1–1	0–0
Pendikspor	1–2	0–2	0–0	1–0	1–3	2–2	1–1	1–1		4–1
Tarsus İdman Yurdu	1–0	3–3	1–0	1–2	1–3	3–0	1–1	0–2	1–1	

Legend: Blue = home team win; Yellow = draw; Red = away team win.

== Classification Group 1 ==
=== Table ===
Pos	Team	Pld	W	D	L	GF	GA	GD	Pts	Qualification or relegation
1	Güngören Belediyespor	32	15	8	9	44	27	+17	53	Qualification for Promotion play-offs
2	Bozüyükspor	32	14	8	10	39	33	+6	50	
3	Eyüpspor	32	15	5	12	44	35	+9	50	
4	Sarıyer G.K.	32	12	11	9	47	41	+6	47	
5	Zeytinburnuspor	32	11	8	13	30	35	−5	41	
6	Gebzespor	32	10	11	11	32	43	−11	41	
7	İnegölspor	32	9	10	13	36	41	−5	37	Relegation to TFF Third League
8	Fatih Karagümrük	32	4	4	24	18	59	−41	16	Relegation to TFF Third League

=== Results ===
Home \ Away	BOZ	EYÜ	KAR	GEB	GÜB	İNE	SAR	ZEY
Bozüyükspor		2–0	1–0	3–1	0–2	2–2	1–2	1–0
Eyüpspor	0–2		4–1	3–1	0–0	1–0	4–3	1–2
Fatih Karagümrük	0–1	3–1		1–2	1–2	1–3	0–2	0–3
Gebzespor	1–1	2–1	0–0		1–0	3–0	2–1	3–4
Güngören Belediyespor	0–2	2–3	3–0	3–1		3–0	1–1	1–1
İnegölspor	1–1	1–1	1–0	0–0	2–0		4–0	0–0
Sarıyer	0–0	3–1	3–0	4–1	0–0	3–1		0–1
Zeytinburnuspor	0–1	0–1	1–0	0–1	0–3	4–1	2–1	

Legend: Blue = home team win; Yellow = draw; Red = away team win.

== Classification Group 2 ==
=== Table ===
Pos	Team	Pld	W	D	L	GF	GA	GD	Pts	Qualification or relegation
1	Alanyaspor	32	18	3	11	55	34	+21	57	Qualification for Promotion play-offs
2	Bucaspor	32	14	8	10	42	28	+14	50	
3	Marmaris Belediyespor	32	13	11	8	33	24	+9	50	
4	Turgutluspor	32	14	8	10	52	42	+10	50	
5	Fethiyespor	32	13	8	11	47	46	+1	47	
6	Afyonkarahisarspor	32	10	6	16	34	42	−8	36	
7	İzmirspor	32	4	10	18	28	50	−22	22	Relegation to TFF Third League
8	Uşakspor	32	3	5	24	27	86	−59	14	Relegation to TFF Third League

=== Results ===
Home \ Away	AFY	ALA	BUC	FET	İZM	MAR	TUR	UŞK
Afyonkarahisarspor		1–2	0–0	0–2	3–1	0–1	4–1	3–0
Alanyaspor	1–0		0–0	4–1	1–0	2–1	2–1	3–0
Bucaspor	1–0	0–0		1–1	2–1	2–1	0–0	5–1
Fethiyespor	0–3	1–2	0–3		2–3	1–2	1–1	4–0
İzmirspor	0–1	0–0	0–3	3–0		1–1	1–1	4–0
Marmaris Belediyespor	2–1	3–2	1–1	0–0	2–0		0–0	3–0
Turgutluspor	1–0	2–0	2–1	4–0	3–0	1–1		5–2
Uşakspor	3–5	1–5	0–1	0–2	1–3	0–3	0–0	

Legend: Blue = home team win; Yellow = draw; Red = away team win.

== Classification Group 3 ==
=== Table ===
Pos	Team	Pld	W	D	L	GF	GA	GD	Pts	Qualification or relegation
1	Bugsaşspor	32	14	8	10	50	33	+17	50	Qualification for Promotion play-offs
2	Türk Telekomspor	32	13	8	11	50	37	+13	47	
3	Kırıkkalespor	32	12	6	14	33	52	−19	42	
4	Alibeyköyspor	32	10	12	10	44	45	−1	42	
5	Yeni Kırşehirspor	32	11	7	14	40	45	−5	40	
6	Maltepespor	32	9	11	12	39	43	−4	38	
7	Küçükköyspor	32	10	5	17	35	47	−12	35	Relegation to TFF Third League
8	Tepecik Belediyespor	32	7	6	19	30	59	−29	27	Relegation to TFF Third League

=== Results ===
Home \ Away	ABK	BUG	KKS	KÜÇ	MAL	TEP	TT	KIR
Alibeyköyspor		1–1	4–0	1–1	1–1	2–0	2–1	2–1
Bugsaşspor	2–2		1–0	3–0	0–2	0–1	0–0	1–0
Kırıkkalespor	2–2	0–4		4–3	1–3	2–1	1–2	1–0
Küçükköyspor	1–1	2–0	1–0		2–1	4–2	0–1	2–0
Maltepespor	2–0	1–1	1–1	1–0		4–0	1–1	0–2
Tepecik Belediyespor	1–3	0–1	1–2	1–0	0–1		3–2	2–4
Türk Telekomspor	3–1	1–3	3–0	3–3	3–2	0–1		1–2
Yeni Kırşehirspor	0–0	0–0	0–0	5–0	1–0	0–0	3–2	

Legend: Blue = home team win; Yellow = draw; Red = away team win.

== Classification Group 4 ==
=== Table ===
Pos	Team	Pld	W	D	L	GF	GA	GD	Pts	Qualification or relegation
1	Çankırı Belediyespor	32	13	9	10	42	42	0	48	Qualification for Promotion play-offs
2	Akçaabat Sebatspor	32	11	10	11	38	41	−3	43	
3	Arsinspor	32	12	7	13	39	40	−1	43	
4	Değirmenderespor	32	10	12	10	52	52	0	42	
5	Yimpaş Yozgatspor	32	11	8	13	47	40	+7	41	
6	Pazarspor	32	10	10	12	40	45	−5	40	
7	Araklıspor	32	11	7	14	30	43	−13	40	Relegation to TFF Third League
8	Erzincanspor	32	10	4	18	41	59	−18	34	Relegation to TFF Third League

=== Results ===
Home \ Away	SEB	ARA	ARS	ÇAN	DEĞ	ERZ	PAZ	YOZ
Akçaabat Sebatspor		3–0	1–0	1–0	3–1	1–4	0–0	3–1
Araklıspor	1–1		0–0	1–0	0–2	5–2	0–0	0–0
Arsinspor	1–0	0–2		2–0	0–0	4–2	0–1	1–0
Çankırı Belediyespor	2–1	1–2	1–0		1–2	2–0	2–1	2–2
Değirmenderespor	1–1	0–1	1–1	2–2		1–0	3–1	2–1
Erzincanspor	0–2	1–0	1–4	2–1	3–4		3–1	1–0
Pazarspor	3–1	3–0	3–5	0–0	2–1	2–1		0–5
Yimpaş Yozgatspor	1–1	0–1	1–0	1–1	4–2	1–3	1–1	

Legend: Blue = home team win; Yellow = draw; Red = away team win.

== Classification Group 5 ==
=== Table ===
Pos	Team	Pld	W	D	L	GF	GA	GD	Pts	Qualification or relegation
1	İskenderun Demir Çelikspor	32	13	14	5	35	23	+12	53	Qualification for Promotion play-offs
2	Gaskispor	32	12	9	11	41	39	+2	45	
3	Şanlıurfaspor	32	10	14	8	33	30	+3	44	
4	Adıyamanspor	32	9	13	10	31	38	−7	40	
5	Diskispor	32	10	10	12	39	38	+1	40	
6	Şanlıurfa Belediyespor	32	10	9	13	39	49	−10	39	
7	Kahramanmaraşspor	32	9	12	11	37	37	0	39	Relegation to TFF Third League
8	Hatayspor	32	3	10	19	27	50	−23	19	Relegation to TFF Third League

=== Results ===
Home \ Away	ADY	DİS	GAS	HAT	İDÇ	KMS	ŞAB	ŞAN
Adıyamanspor		1–0	1–3	3–2	1–1	0–2	0–0	2–1
Diskispor	1–1		3–1	2–0	3–0	1–1	1–2	1–2
Gaskispor	0–2	0–1		0–0	0–0	0–1	5–1	4–2
Hatayspor	0–1	0–3	1–2		2–3	1–2	1–2	1–1
İskenderun Demir Çelikspor	0–0	1–1	0–0	2–0		0–0	4–1	1–0
Kahramanmaraşspor	3–1	1–1	3–0	5–1	0–2		2–2	1–1
Şanlıurfa Belediyespor	1–2	1–4	1–2	0–3	1–1	1–0		2–0
Şanlıurfaspor	0–1	2–1	3–2	1–0	3–2	1–1	1–1	

Legend: Blue = home team win; Yellow = draw; Red = away team win.

== Play-off games ==
=== Quarter-finals ===
May 24, 2008
16:00

Adana Demirspor	1 – 0 (ET)	İskenderun Demir Çelikspor
116(p)' İbrahim

Konya Atatürk Stadium, Konya
Referee: İlker Meral

May 24, 2008
19:20

Alanyaspor	0 – 3	Çankırı Belediyespor
		15' Muhsin; 50' Muzaffer; 56' Ferdi

Konya Atatürk Stadium, Konya
Referee: Bünyamin Gezer

May 25, 2008
17:30

Etimesgut Şekerspor	1 – 2	Güngören Belediyespor
44' Cihan		1' Adem; 54' Turan

Konya Atatürk Stadium, Konya
Referee: Aytekin Durmaz

May 25, 2008
20:30

Gaziosmanpaşaspor	0 – 1	Bugsaşspor
		89' Ali

Konya Atatürk Stadium, Konya
Referee: Mustafa Kamil Abitoğlu

=== Semi-final ===
May 27, 2008
17:30

Adana Demirspor	3 – 0 (ET)	Çankırı Belediyespor
98' Serkan; 109' Emrah; 113' Kenan

Konya Atatürk Stadium, Konya
Referee: Özgüç Türkalp

May 28, 2008
18:00

Güngören Belediyespor	1 – 1	Bugsaşspor
88' Güney		47' Adem
Penalties
İlkay (penalty scored); Hamza (penalty scored); Adem (penalty scored); Turan (penalty scored); Ersin (penalty scored)	5–3	(penalty scored) Eyüp; (penalty scored) Ziya; (penalty scored) Orhan; (penalty missed) Satılmış

Konya Atatürk Stadium, Konya
Referee: Halis Özkahya

=== Final ===
May 30, 2008
17:00

Adana Demirspor	0 – 1	Güngören Belediyespor
		89' Hakan

Konya Atatürk Stadium, Konya
Referee: Bülent Yıldırım
