= 2006–07 TFF Third League =

The 2006–07 TFF Third League is the 2006–07 season of Turkish Third League.

== Standings ==
=== Group 1 ===
Pos	Team	Pld	W	D	L	GF	GA	GD	Pts
1	Diskispor	30	17	9	4	57	20	+37	60
2	Adanaspor	30	16	9	5	55	16	+39	57
3	Mersin B.Ş. Belediyespor	30	16	7	7	43	26	+17	55
4	Aksarayspor	30	16	4	10	37	29	+8	52
5	Batman Belediyespor	30	15	5	10	41	31	+10	50
6	Batman Petrolspor	30	15	5	10	39	34	+5	50
7	Yeni Ereğlispor	30	12	11	7	33	30	+3	47
8	Şırnakspor	30	12	9	9	44	32	+12	45
9	Belediye Vanspor	30	13	5	12	47	35	+12	44
10	Nusaybin Demirspor	30	12	6	12	36	40	−4	42
11	Ceyhanspor	30	10	7	13	36	44	−8	37
12	Kilis Belediyespor	30	8	9	13	25	41	−16	33
13	Kayapınar Belediyespor	30	7	7	16	29	36	−7	28
14	Antakyaspor	30	6	8	16	25	46	−21	26
15	Osmaniyespor	30	5	9	16	23	64	−41	24
16	Karamanspor	30	4	2	24	16	62	−46	11 (Note: Karamanspor's 3 points were deducted due to she didn't field Yeni Ereğlispor away match in Round 30.)

=== Group 2 ===
Pos	Team	Pld	W	D	L	GF	GA	GD	Pts
1	Araklıspor	30	16	11	3	38	20	+18	59
2	Buğşaş Spor	30	16	9	5	51	19	+32	57
3	Bulancakspor	30	15	12	3	48	24	+24	57
4	Değirmenderespor	30	16	7	7	43	28	+15	55
5	Gümüşhanespor	30	14	9	7	16	11	+5	51
6	Ofspor	30	15	6	9	46	29	+17	51
7	Bağlum Belediyespor	30	13	8	9	41	33	+8	47
8	Ankara Demirspor	30	11	8	11	39	33	+6	41
9	Gazi Belediyespor	30	10	5	15	36	42	−6	35
10	Sürmenespor	30	9	8	13	22	29	−7	35
11	Çorumspor	30	8	9	13	27	27	0	33
12	Karsspor	30	9	9	12	30	34	−4	33 (Note: Karsspor and Iğdırspor are deducted 3 points due to they did not field against Çorumspor by TFF on May 2.)
13	Tarım Kredispor	30	9	6	15	28	39	−11	33
14	Artvin Hopaspor	30	8	5	17	20	51	−31	29
15	Demir Çelik Divriğispor	30	4	12	14	27	54	−27	24
16	Iğdırspor	30	4	2	24	24	75	−51	11

Notes:

Note: In this group, 1 team is relegated to Amateur leagues due to DÇ. Divriğispor had accident while going to Gümüşhanespor away match and some players were injured in Round 21, so that their matched were awarded 3-0 for their rivals and DÇ. Divriğispor remained to Fourth Level.

=== Group 3 ===
Pos	Team	Pld	W	D	L	GF	GA	GD	Pts
1	Bozüyükspor	30	18	9	3	43	22	+21	63
2	Afyonkarahisarspor	30	17	6	7	45	24	+21	57
3	Aliağa Belediyespor	30	13	10	7	40	25	+15	49
4	Bursa Merinosspor	30	13	9	8	44	33	+11	48
5	Denizli Belediyespor	30	13	9	8	36	26	+10	48
6	Altınordu	30	12	8	10	29	28	+1	44
7	Nilüfer Belediye SK	30	12	7	11	37	33	+4	43
8	Balıkesirspor	30	11	8	11	37	32	+5	41
9	Aydınspor	30	8	12	10	29	36	−7	36
10	Kütahyaspor	30	10	6	14	27	37	−10	36
11	Ispartaspor	30	9	7	14	28	37	−9	34 (Note: Ispartaspor, Mustafakemalpaşaspor and Akhisar Belediyespor are classified according to played matches each other.)
12	Mustafakemalpaşaspor	30	7	13	10	28	30	−2	34
13	Akhisar Bld	30	7	13	10	30	29	+1	34
14	Yeni Burdurspor	30	7	10	13	25	38	−13	31
15	Göztepe	30	8	4	18	21	47	−26	28
16	Sidespor	30	7	5	18	20	42	−22	26

=== Group 4 ===
Pos	Team	Pld	W	D	L	GF	GA	GD	Pts
1	Gaziosmanpaşaspor	30	18	10	2	60	22	+38	64
2	Tepecik Belediyespor	30	15	9	6	46	27	+19	54
3	Alibeyköyspor	30	16	5	9	49	35	+14	53
4	Gölcükspor	30	14	7	9	40	29	+11	49
5	Orhangazispor	30	13	9	8	47	40	+7	48
6	Bilecikspor	30	13	9	8	33	23	+10	48
7	Kastamonuspor	30	10	12	8	44	42	+2	42
8	Zonguldakspor	30	11	4	15	38	42	−4	37
9	Orhangazi Gençlerbirliği	30	10	6	14	30	37	−7	36
10	Anadolu Üsküdar 1908	30	10	6	14	39	54	−15	36
11	Beykoz 1908	30	9	9	12	25	32	−7	36
12	Küçükçekmecespor	30	10	5	15	35	40	−5	35
13	Yıldırım Bosnaspor	30	8	7	15	31	44	−13	31
14	Beylerbeyi SK	30	7	10	13	30	45	−15	31
15	Çorluspor	30	8	6	16	27	50	−23	30
16	Bakırköyspor	30	6	8	16	30	41	−11	26

First two teams of each group directly promoted to Iddaa League B. 3rd and 4th teams of each group played Promotion Play-Off matches. Last two teams of each group, except DÇ. Divriğispor, relegated to Amateur leagues. Lüleburgazspor, Bingöl Belediyespor, Tavşanlı Linyitspor, Kocaeli Körfez Belediyespor, Torbalı Belediyespor, Konya Şekerspor, Bafra Belediyespor (Bafraspor's new name since 1999) and Malatya Belediyespor promoted to Third League.

Extra Play-off matches:

All matches were played in Cebeci Stadium in Ankara:

Semifinals:

May 7

Aksarayspor - Aliağa Belediyespor: 1-6 Değirmenderespor - Bursa Merinosspor: 2-1

May 8

Bulancakspor - Alibeyköyspor: 1-2

May 23

Gölcükspor - Mersin Büyükşehir Belediyespor: 1-1 (Penalty: 4-2, Total: 5-3)

Finals:

May 9

Değirmenderespor - Aliağa Belediyespor: 1-1 (Penalty: 4-3, Total: 5-4)

May 29

Alibeyköyspor - Gölcükspor: 4-3

Değirmenderespor and Alibeyköyspor also promoted to Third Level or Iddaa League B.

Note: Referee of Gölcükspor - Mersin Büyükşehir Belediyespor match declared winner as Gölcükspor without shooting 4th penalty kick of Gölcükspor, penalty score was 3-2 on May 8. TFF declared continuing penalty kicks from remained place on May 10 due to Mersin BŞB's objection. However Mersin Büyükşehir Belediyespor didn't field on May 10, so that Gölcükspor is declared win- ner of the match by TFF. However, after Mersin Büyükşehir Belediyespor's objection, TFF insisted its decision on May 10.

== See also ==
- 2006–07 Süper Lig
- 2006–07 TFF First League
- 2006–07 TFF Second League
