= 2008–09 TFF Third League =

The standings of the teams playing in TFF 3. Lig Ranking Groups, Classifying Groups and Promotion Group in 2008–09 season are as follows.
According to league regulations, if two or more teams are on equal points after the end of the season, higher number of points obtained in the matches played among the teams in question will be used to separate teams.

== Ranking groups ==
=== Group 1 ===
Pos	Team	Pld	W	D	L	GF	GA	GD	Pts	Qualification
1	Tepecik Belediyespor	18	12	2	4	31	22	+9	38	Qualification to Promotion Group
2	Lüleburgazspor	18	11	2	5	29	15	+14	35	Qualification to Promotion Group
3	Gölcükspor	18	9	7	2	27	17	+10	34	
4	Yalovaspor	18	10	3	5	32	18	+14	33	
5	Anadolu Üsküdar 1908	18	7	6	5	27	22	+5	27	
6	Fatih Karagümrük	18	6	4	8	24	25	−1	22	
7	Orhangazi Gençlerbirliği	18	5	6	7	17	24	−7	21	
8	Oyak Renaultspor	18	6	2	10	12	18	−6	20	
9	Yıldırım Bosnaspor	18	2	6	10	9	23	−14	12	
10	Küçükköyspor	18	2	2	14	13	37	−24	8	

Last updated on December 28, 2008

=== Group 2 ===
Pos	Team	Pld	W	D	L	GF	GA	GD	Pts	Qualification
1	Göztepe	18	8	7	3	24	18	+6	31	Qualification to Promotion Group
2	İzmirspor	18	9	3	6	21	16	+5	30	Qualification to Promotion Group
3	Nazilli Belediyespor	18	9	2	7	22	15	+7	29	
4	Menemen Belediyespor	18	8	4	6	27	21	+6	28	
5	Ispartaspor	18	7	4	7	23	24	−1	25	
6	Aydınspor	18	9	1	8	23	22	+1	25 (Note: 3 points deducted)	
7	Bandırmaspor	18	7	3	8	18	17	+1	24	
8	Balıkesirspor	18	7	2	9	27	34	−7	23	
9	Torbalıspor	18	5	4	9	17	23	−6	19	
10	Mustafakemalpaşaspor	18	4	4	10	17	29	−12	16	

Notes:

Last updated on December 28, 2008

=== Group 3 ===
Pos	Team	Pld	W	D	L	GF	GA	GD	Pts	Qualification
1	TKİ Tavşanlı Linyitspor	18	11	4	3	35	16	+19	37	Qualification to Promotion Group
2	Pursaklarspor	18	10	4	4	35	17	+18	34	Qualification to Promotion Group
3	Keçiörengücü	18	9	5	4	32	17	+15	32	
4	İnegölspor	18	9	5	4	21	16	+5	32	
5	Orhangazispor	18	8	5	5	37	22	+15	29	
6	Keçiören Belediyespor	18	7	6	5	36	30	+6	27	
7	Bursa Nilüferspor	18	5	9	4	32	19	+13	24	
8	Düzcespor	18	4	6	8	20	25	−5	18	
9	Aksarayspor	18	3	4	11	23	35	−12	13	
10	Uşakspor	18	0	0	18	6	80	−74	0	

Last updated on December 29, 2008

=== Group 4 ===
Pos	Team	Pld	W	D	L	GF	GA	GD	Pts	Qualification
1	Bafra Belediyespor	18	9	6	3	30	18	+12	33	Qualification to Promotion Group
2	Ankara Demirspor	18	10	3	5	31	21	+10	33	Qualification to Promotion Group
3	Kastamonuspor	18	10	3	5	35	18	+17	33	
4	Gümüşhanespor	18	9	5	4	22	12	+10	32	
5	Araklıspor	18	6	6	6	21	23	−2	24	
6	Sürmenespor	18	6	5	7	23	29	−6	23	
7	Bulancakspor	18	5	7	6	16	18	−2	22	
8	Ünyespor	18	6	2	10	17	25	−8	20	
9	D.Ç. Divriğispor	18	4	2	12	17	31	−14	14	
10	Erzincanspor	18	3	5	10	14	31	−17	14	

Last updated on December 28, 2008

=== Group 5 ===
Pos	Team	Pld	W	D	L	GF	GA	GD	Pts	Qualification
1	Hatayspor	18	10	6	2	23	12	+11	36	Qualification to Promotion Group
2	Kahramanmaraşspor	18	10	5	3	37	16	+21	35	Qualification to Promotion Group
3	Batman Belediyespor	18	9	6	3	26	15	+11	33	
4	Batman Petrolspor	18	9	3	6	30	22	+8	30	
5	Siirtspor	18	7	5	6	24	20	+4	26	
6	Belediye Bingölspor	18	6	6	6	17	21	−4	24	
7	Ceyhanspor	18	6	4	8	21	21	0	22	
8	Diyarbakır Kayapınar Belediyespor	18	5	4	9	18	32	−14	19	
9	Bağlar Vuralspor	18	4	1	13	19	38	−19	13	
10	Kilis Belediyespor	18	3	2	13	13	31	−18	11	

Last updated on December 28, 2008

== Classifying groups ==
=== Group 1 ===
Pos	Team	Pld	W	D	L	GF	GA	GD	Pts	Qualification or relegation
1	Yalovaspor	32	15	10	7	52	33	+19	55	Qualification to Play-offs
2	Gölcükspor	32	12	15	5	42	33	+9	51	
3	Anadolu Üsküdar 1908	32	11	12	9	41	34	+7	45	
4	Oyak Renaultspor	32	10	6	16	27	34	−7	36	
5	Küçükköyspor	32	10	6	16	27	49	−22	36	
6	Yıldırım Bosnaspor	32	8	11	13	24	33	−9	35	
7	Orhangazi Gençlerbirliği	32	9	7	16	33	47	−14	34	Relegation to Amateur Leagues
8	Fatih Karagümrük	32	9	7	16	35	41	−6	34	Relegation to Amateur Leagues

Last updated on May 24, 2009

=== Group 2 ===
Pos	Team	Pld	W	D	L	GF	GA	GD	Pts	Qualification or relegation
1	Balıkesirspor	32	14	5	13	44	46	−2	47	Qualification to Play-offs
2	Bandırmaspor	32	14	5	13	38	29	+9	47	
3	Nazilli Belediyespor	32	13	6	13	38	33	+5	45	
4	Menemen Belediyespor	32	12	8	12	43	43	0	44	
5	Torbalıspor	32	12	8	12	35	34	+1	44	
6	Ispartaspor	32	12	7	13	39	44	−5	43	
7	Aydınspor	32	13	3	16	36	39	−3	39 (Note: 3 points deducted)	Relegation to Amateur Leagues
8	Mustafakemalpaşaspor	32	10	6	16	39	55	−16	36	Relegation to Amateur Leagues

Notes:

Last updated on May 24, 2009

=== Group 3 ===
Pos	Team	Pld	W	D	L	GF	GA	GD	Pts	Qualification or relegation
1	İnegölspor	32	17	8	7	48	30	+18	59	Qualification to Play-offs
2	Keçiörengücü	32	16	9	7	54	29	+25	57	
3	Bursa Nilüferspor	32	14	10	8	60	36	+24	52	
4	Orhangazispor	32	11	10	11	55	43	+12	43	
5	Keçiören Belediyespor	32	11	9	12	56	52	+4	42	
6	Düzcespor	32	11	8	13	39	37	+2	41	
7	Aksarayspor	32	12	4	16	51	57	−6	40	Relegation to Amateur Leagues
8	Uşakspor	32	0	0	32	6	122	−116	0	Relegation to Amateur Leagues

Last updated on May 24, 2009

=== Group 4 ===
Pos	Team	Pld	W	D	L	GF	GA	GD	Pts	Qualification or relegation
1	Kastamonuspor	32	17	7	8	60	32	+28	58	Qualification to Play-offs
2	Araklıspor	32	14	8	10	45	37	+8	50	
3	Gümüşhanespor	32	13	9	10	34	29	+5	48	
4	Sürmenespor	32	13	7	12	41	44	−3	46	
5	Bulancakspor	32	10	9	13	25	36	−11	39	
6	Ünyespor	32	11	4	17	35	44	−9	37	
7	Erzincanspor	32	10	7	15	31	43	−12	37	Relegation to Amateur Leagues
8	D.Ç. Divriğispor	32	6	6	20	27	55	−28	24	Relegation to Amateur Leagues

Last updated on May 24, 2009

=== Group 5 ===
Pos	Team	Pld	W	D	L	GF	GA	GD	Pts	Qualification or relegation
1	Batman Belediyespor	32	15	10	7	46	28	+18	55	Qualification to Play-offs
2	Batman Petrolspor	32	14	6	12	51	44	+7	48	
3	Siirtspor	32	12	9	11	48	41	+7	45	
4	Diyarbakır Kayapınar Belediyespor	32	13	5	14	39	50	−11	44	
5	Belediye Bingölspor	32	8	14	10	27	36	−9	38	
6	Ceyhanspor	32	9	11	12	37	38	−1	38	
7	Bağlar Vuralspor	32	11	3	18	40	56	−16	36	Relegation to Amateur Leagues
8	Kilis Belediyespor	32	7	5	20	31	58	−27	26	Relegation to Amateur Leagues

Last updated on May 24, 2009

== Promotion group ==
Pos	Team	Pld	W	D	L	GF	GA	GD	Pts	Promotion or qualification
1	Göztepe	18	12	4	2	24	11	+13	40	Promotion to TFF 2. Lig
2	Tepecik Belediyespor	18	11	5	2	24	13	+11	38	Promotion to TFF 2. Lig
3	TKİ Tavşanlı Linyitspor	18	9	5	4	25	13	+12	32	Promotion to TFF 2. Lig
4	Kahramanmaraşspor	18	10	1	7	33	27	+6	31	Promotion to TFF 2. Lig
5	Ankara Demirspor	18	7	6	5	30	27	+3	27	Qualification to Play-offs
6	Hatayspor	18	6	4	8	24	24	0	22	Qualification to Play-offs
7	Pursaklarspor	18	5	4	9	17	21	−4	19	Qualification to Play-offs
8	Bafra Belediyespor	18	6	1	11	24	30	−6	19	
9	Lüleburgazspor	18	2	9	7	13	22	−9	15	
10	İzmirspor	18	1	3	14	7	33	−26	6	

Last updated on May 24, 2009

== Play-offs ==
=== Group matches ===
2009-05-29
14:00

Batman Belediyespor (Turkey)	1 – 2	(Turkey) İnegölspor
	Report

12 Haziran Stadium, Amasya
Referee: Çağatay Şahan

2009-05-29
14:00

Yalovaspor (Turkey)	2 – 1	(Turkey) Kastamonuspor
	Report

Karaelmas K.Köksal Stadium, Zonguldak
Referee: Mürvet Sezer

2009-05-29
17:00

Balıkesirspor (Turkey)	1 – 2	(Turkey) Pursaklarspor
	Report

12 Haziran Stadium, Amasya
Referee: Hüseyin Sabancı

2009-05-29
17:00

Ankara Demirspor (Turkey)	1 – 1 (2 – 5 pen.)	(Turkey) Hatayspor
	Report

Karaelmas K.Köksal Stadium, Zonguldak
Referee: Mustafa Öğretmenoğlu

=== Finals ===
2009-05-31
17:00

İnegölspor (Turkey)	0 – 1	(Turkey) Pursaklarspor
	Report

12 Haziran Stadium, Amasya
Referee: Hakan Özkan

2009-05-31
17:00

Yalovaspor (Turkey)	2 – 1	(Turkey) Hatayspor
	Report

Karaelmas K.Köksal Stadium, Zonguldak
Referee: İlker Meral

Winner	2nd	3rd	4th	Playoff Winner	Playoff Winner
Göztepe	Tepecik Belediyespor	TKİ Tavşanlı Linyitspor	Kahramanmaraşspor	Pursaklarspor	Yalovaspor

TFF 3. Lig 2008–09 Winners

First title
