= 2006–07 TFF Second League =

Iddaa League B 2006–07 is the 2006-2007 season of Iddaa League B.

== First round ==
=== Group A ===
Pos	Team	Pld	Pts	Qualification
1	Sarıyer G.K.	18	31	Qualified for Play-Off Group
2	Küçükköyspor	18	29	Qualified for Play-Off Group
3	Eyüpspor	18	29	Remained in Classifying Group
4	Etimesgut Şekerspor	18	28	Remained in Classifying Group
5	İnegölspor	18	26	Remained in Classifying Group
6	Çanakkale Dardanelspor	18	24	Remained in Classifying Group
7	Güngören Belediyespor	18	24	Remained in Classifying Group
8	Yalovaspor	18	20	Remained in Classifying Group
9	Fatih Karagümrük	18	19	Remained in Classifying Group
10	OYAK Renault	18	13	Remained in Classifying Group

Source: RSSSF

=== Group B ===
Pos	Team	Pld	Pts	Qualification
1	Tarsus İdman Yurdu	18	37	Qualified for Play-Off Group
2	Alanyaspor	18	36	Qualified for Play-Off Group
3	Mersin İdman Yurdu	18	29	Remained in Classifying Group
4	Marmaris Belediyespor	18	28	Remained in Classifying Group
5	Bucaspor	18	28	Remained in Classifying Group
6	Turgutluspor	18	19	Remained in Classifying Group
7	Nazilli Belediyespor	18	19	Remained in Classifying Group
8	İzmirspor	18	19	Remained in Classifying Group
9	Muğlaspor	18	17	Remained in Classifying Group
10	Fethiyespor	18	15	Remained in Classifying Group

Source: RSSSF

=== Group C ===
Pos	Team	Pld	Pts	Qualification
1	Kartalspor	18	32	Qualified for Play-Off Group
2	Boluspor	18	32	Qualified for Play-Off Group
3	Karabükspor	18	28	Remained in Classifying Group
4	Çankırı Belediyespor	18	28	Remained in Classifying Group
5	Zeytinburnuspor	18	26	Remained in Classifying Group
6	Maltepespor	18	26	Remained in Classifying Group
7	Pendikspor	18	23	Remained in Classifying Group
8	Gebzespor	18	22	Remained in Classifying Group
9	Keçiörengücü	18	17	Remained in Classifying Group
10	Darıca Gençlerbirliği	18	8	Remained in Classifying Group

Source: RSSSF

=== Group D ===
Pos	Team	Pld	Pts	Qualification
1	Kırıkkalespor	18	33	Qualified for Play-Off Group
2	Arsinspor	18	31	Qualified for Play-Off Group
3	Giresunspor	18	31	Remained in Classifying Group
4	Pazarspor	18	30	Remained in Classifying Group
5	Yimpaş Yozgatspor	18	28	Remained in Classifying Group
6	Ünyespor	18	25	Remained in Classifying Group
7	Yeni Kırşehirspor	18	23	Remained in Classifying Group
8	Tokatspor	18	19	Remained in Classifying Group
9	Erzincanspor	18	18	Remained in Classifying Group
10	Erzurumspor	18	13	Remained in Classifying Group

Source: RSSSF

=== Group E ===
Pos	Team	Pld	Pts	Qualification
1	Adana Demirspor	18	34	Qualified for Play-Off Group
2	Şanlıurfaspor	18	30	Qualified for Play-Off Group
3	Kahramanmaraşspor	18	29	Remained in Classifying Group
4	Hatayspor	18	26	Remained in Classifying Group
5	Şanlıurfa Belediyespor	18	22	Remained in Classifying Group
6	İskenderun Demir Çelikspor	18	20	Remained in Classifying Group
7	Adıyamanspor	18	20	Remained in Classifying Group
8	Gaskispor	18	20	Remained in Classifying Group
9	Cizrespor	18	20	Remained in Classifying Group
10	Siirtspor	18	18	Remained in Classifying Group

Source: RSSSF

== Second round ==
=== Classification groups ===
==== Group A ====
Pos	Team	Pld	W	D	L	GF	GA	GD	Pts	Qualification or relegation
1	Etimesgut Şekerspor	32	15	13	4	54	36	+18	58	Play-offs
2	Eyüpspor	32	14	10	8	42	29	+13	52	
3	İnegölspor	32	13	7	12	49	39	+10	46	
4	Güngören Belediyespor	32	12	10	10	42	40	+2	46	
5	Fatih Karagümrük	32	10	10	12	42	49	−7	40	
6	Çanakkale Dardanelspor	32	9	11	12	36	43	−7	38	
7	Yalovaspor	32	9	7	16	40	52	−12	34	Relegated to Turkish Third League
8	OYAK Renault	32	4	8	20	30	56	−26	20	Relegated to Turkish Third League

Source: RSSSF

==== Group B ====
Pos	Team	Pld	W	D	L	GF	GA	GD	Pts	Qualification or relegation
1	Marmaris Belediyespor	32	11	14	7	39	35	+4	47	Play-offs
2	Bucaspor	32	12	10	10	44	44	0	46	
3	Mersin Idman Yurdu	32	11	10	11	41	45	−4	43	
4	Fethiyespor	32	10	8	14	39	42	−3	38	
5	İzmirspor	32	9	10	13	41	44	−3	37	
6	Turgutluspor	32	7	15	10	44	42	+2	36 (Note: Hold tie-breaker over Nazilli Belediyespor 9-2.)	
7	Nazilli Belediyespor	32	9	9	14	36	52	−16	36	Relegated to Turkish Third League
8	Muğlaspor	32	7	12	13	39	49	−10	33	Relegated to Turkish Third League

Source: RSSSF

==== Group C ====
Pos	Team	Pld	W	D	L	GF	GA	GD	Pts	Qualification or relegation
1	Karabükspor	32	17	6	9	37	28	+9	57	Play-offs
2	Pendikspor	32	12	13	7	40	30	+10	49	
3	Gebzespor	32	12	7	13	43	37	+6	43	
4	Çankırı Belediyespor	32	11	7	14	28	40	−12	40	
5	Maltepespor	32	10	10	12	35	48	−13	40	
6	Zeytinburnuspor	32	9	12	11	40	41	−1	39	
7	Keçiörengücü	32	9	10	13	42	43	−1	37	Relegated to Turkish Third League
8	Darıca Gençlerbirliği	32	6	9	17	36	51	−15	27	Relegated to Turkish Third League

Source: RSSSF

==== Group D ====
Pos	Team	Pld	W	D	L	GF	GA	GD	Pts	Qualification or relegation
1	Giresunspor	32	16	7	9	59	40	+19	55	Play-offs
2	Pazarspor	32	12	9	11	52	42	+10	45	
3	Yeni Kırşehirspor	32	12	9	11	37	37	0	45	
4	Yimpaş Yozgatspor	32	10	10	12	33	38	−5	40	
5	Erzurumspor	32	11	7	14	41	56	−15	40	
6	Erzincanspor	32	11	6	15	33	45	−12	39 (Note: Hold tie-breaker over Tokatspor 8-4.)	
7	Tokatspor	32	10	9	13	33	34	−1	39	Relegated to Turkish Third League
8	Ünyespor	32	9	7	16	33	44	−11	34	Relegated to Turkish Third League

Source: RSSSF

==== Group E ====
Pos	Team	Pld	W	D	L	GF	GA	GD	Pts	Qualification or relegation
1	Kahramanmaraşspor	32	13	10	9	34	30	+4	49	Play-offs
2	İskenderun Demir Çelikspor	32	14	6	12	36	31	+5	48	
3	Hatayspor	32	11	13	8	29	25	+4	46	
4	Gaskispor	32	12	8	12	41	52	−11	44	
5	Şanlıurfa Belediyespor	32	9	15	8	42	41	+1	42	
6	Adıyamanspor	32	11	9	12	38	38	0	42	
7	Siirtspor	32	9	7	16	34	39	−5	34	Relegated to Turkish Third League
8	Cizrespor	32	4	11	17	28	50	−22	23	Relegated to Turkish Third League

Source: RSSSF

=== Promotion group ===
Pos	Team	Pld	W	D	L	GF	GA	GD	Pts	Promotion or qualification
1	Boluspor	18	9	6	3	27	11	+16	33	Promoted to Türk Telekom League A
2	Kartalspor	18	8	7	3	24	12	+12	31 (Note: Hold tie-breaker of Adana Demirspor 2-1.)	Promoted to Türk Telekom League A
3	Adana Demirspor	18	8	7	3	29	21	+8	31	Play-offs
4	Alanyaspor	18	6	9	3	27	25	+2	27	Play-offs
5	Kırıkkalespor	18	7	5	6	22	18	+4	26	Play-offs
6	Tarsus Idman Yurdu	18	7	4	7	22	20	+2	25	
7	Arsinspor	18	5	6	7	18	35	−17	21	
8	Küçükköyspor	18	4	5	9	18	29	−11	17	
9	Şanlıurfaspor	18	4	4	10	24	30	−6	16	
10	Sarıyer G.K.	18	3	5	10	23	33	−10	14	

Source: RSSSF

== Third Round (Extra Play-Off) ==
- All matches were played at Bursa Atatürk Stadium.

=== Quarterfinals ===
Team 1	Score	Team 2
Alanyaspor	3–1	Kırıkkalespor
Kardemir Karabükspor	1–4	Adana Demirspor
Giresunspor	3–1	Kahramanmaraşspor
Marmaris Belediyespor	0–0 (5–4 p)	Etimesgut Şekerspor

=== Semifinals ===
Team 1	Score	Team 2
Alanyaspor	0–0 (2–4 p)	Adana Demirspor
Giresunspor	1–1 (4–2 p)	Marmaris Belediyespor

=== Final ===
Team 1	Score	Team 2
Adana Demirspor	1–5	Giresunspor

Source: RSSSF

== See also ==
- 2006–07 Süper Lig
- 2006–07 TFF First League
- 2006–07 TFF Third League
