= 2008–09 TFF Third League Group 2 =

TFF 3. Lig - Ranking Group 2 (2008–09)
- Number of Teams: 10; Qualifying Teams: Göztepe, İzmirspor; Start Date: September 6, 2008; End Date: December 28, 2008

The TFF Third League or TFF 3. Lig is the fourth level in the Turkish football league system. The league contains 50 clubs spread out over 4 groups with 10 clubs in Stage 1 (Ranking Groups). The top two clubs from each group qualify to the Promotion Group of Stage 2.
The rest of the clubs stay in their groups which are called Classifying Groups and carry over their records from Stage 1.

== Teams ==
Location of teams in TFF Third League - Ranking Group 2 (2008–09)

== Standings ==
Pos	Team	Pld	W	D	L	GF	GA	GD	Pts	Qualification
1	Göztepe	18	8	7	3	24	18	+6	31	Qualification to Promotion Group
2	İzmirspor	18	9	3	6	21	16	+5	30	Qualification to Promotion Group
3	Nazilli Belediyespor	18	9	2	7	22	15	+7	29	
4	Menemen Belediyespor	18	8	4	6	27	21	+6	28	
5	Ispartaspor	18	7	4	7	23	24	−1	25	
6	Aydınspor	18	9	1	8	23	22	+1	25 (Note: Received 3 Penalty Points)	
7	Bandırmaspor	18	7	3	8	18	17	+1	24	
8	Balıkesirspor	18	7	2	9	27	34	−7	23	
9	Torbalıspor	18	5	4	9	17	23	−6	19	
10	Mustafakemalpaşaspor	18	4	4	10	17	29	−12	16	

Rules for classification: If two or more teams are on equal points after the end of the season, higher number of points obtained in the matches played among the teams in question will be used to separate teams.

== Results ==
Last updated on December 28, 2008

Home \ Away	AYD	BAL	BAN	GÖZ	ISP	İZM	MEN	MUS	NAZ	TOR
Aydınspor		2–0	0–0	1–2	2–1	1–0	2–1	5–2	0–3	4–0
Balıkesirspor	3–1		3–1	1–2	2–1	1–1	2–0	0–1	0–2	2–1
Bandırmaspor	0–1	2–1		2–2	3–0	0–1	0–1	1–0	1–2	0–0
Göztepe	1–0	2–1	2–1		2–0	1–2	2–2	1–0	0–0	2–1
Ispartaspor	3–0	2–2	3–2	2–1		1–2	0–0	2–2	1–0	2–0
İzmirspor	2–0	3–0	1–0	0–0	1–3		1–0	2–3	1–0	1–1
Menemen Belediyespor	3–2	4–1	0–1	1–1	2–0	3–1		3–0	3–1	2–1
Mustafakemalpaşaspor	0–1	2–3	0–2	1–1	1–1	1–0	4–1		0–2	0–0
Nazilli Belediyespor	1–0	2–3	0–1	1–1	0–1	1–0	2–1	2–0		3–1
Torbalıspor	0–1	5–2	0–1	2–1	2–0	0–2	0–0	2–0	1–0	

Legend: Blue = home team win; Yellow = draw; Red = away team win.

== Top scorers ==
- Last updated on December 28, 2008

Scorer	Team	Goals
(Turkey) Recep Gayık	Göztepe	9
(Turkey) Yücel Kaya	Ispartaspor	9
(Turkey) Serdar Kılıç	Nazilli Belediyespor	7
(Turkey) Cenk Laleci	Menemen Belediyespor	6
(Turkey) Üstün Bilgi	Mustafakemalpaşaspor	6
(Turkey) Ali Kafadar	Bandırmaspor	5
(Turkey) Burhanettin Çakırefe	Menemen Belediyespor	5
(Turkey) Hakan Karakayalı	Göztepe	5
(Turkey) İbrahim Kumcu	Ispartaspor	5
(Turkey) Umut Salgınoğlu	Balıkesirspor	5

== Stadiums ==
Team	Stadium	Capacity
Göztepe	İzmir Alsancak Stadium	15,358
Göztepe	İzmir Atatürk Stadium	51,295
İzmirspor	İzmir Alsancak Stadium	15,358
Balıkesirspor	Balıkesir Atatürk Stadium	11,700
Aydınspor	Aydın Adnan Menderes Stadium	10,500
Aydınspor	Mukan Perinçek Stadium	2,000
Ispartaspor	Isparta Atatürk Stadium	10,000
Bandırmaspor	Bandırma 17 Eylül Stadium	5,400
Nazilli Belediyespor	Nazilli İlçe Stadium	4,500
Torbalıspor	Torbalı 7 Eylül Stadium	2,500
Menemen Belediyespor	Menemen Şehir Stadium	2,500
Mustafakemalpaşaspor	Mustafa Kemal Paşa İlçe Stadium	2,378
