= Olcay Çetinkaya =

Turkish footballer

Personal information
- Date of birth: 28 October 1979 (age 47)
- Place of birth: Istanbul, Turkey
- Height: 1.95 m (6 ft 5 in)
- Position: Goalkeeper

Youth career
- 1996–97: İstanbulspor

Senior career*
Years	Team	Apps	(Gls)
1998–2003	Dardanelspor	2	(0)
2000	→ Zonguldakspor (loan)		
2000–2001	→ Karabükspor (loan)		
2002	→ Gebzespor (loan)		
2002–2003	→ Kartalspor (loan)		
2003–2004	Yıldırım Bosna		
2004–2005	Bandırmaspor		
2005	Küçükköyspor		
2005–2006	Fatih Karagümrük		
2006–2007	Muğlaspor		
2007	Aydınspor 1923		
2007–2008	Fatih Karagümrük		
2008–2009	Yalovaspor		
2009–2010	İstanbulspor		
2010–2013	Balıkesirspor	29	(0)
2014–2015	Kırklarelispor	26	(0)
2015	Tokatspor	3	(0)
2015–2016	Yeşilova		
2017–2018	Kemalpaşaspor		
- * Club domestic league appearances and goals

Olcay Çetinkaya (born 28 October 1979) is a Turkish former professional footballer. He played as a goalkeeper.

== Career ==
He also played for Kepez Belediyespor, Çanakkale Dardanelspor, Zonguldakspor, Karabükspor, Gebzespor, Kartalspor, Yıldırım Bosnaspor, Bandırmaspor, Küçükköyspor, Fatih Karagümrük, Muğlaspor, Aydınspor.
