= İskender Köksal =

Turkish footballer

Personal information
- Date of birth: 22 August 1981 (age 45)
- Place of birth: Istanbul, Turkey
- Height: 1.87 m (6 ft 2 in)
- Position: Defender

Youth career
- Beşiktaş

Senior career*
Years	Team	Apps	(Gls)
2000–2003	Beşiktaş	0	(0)
2001–2002	→ Yalovaspor (loan)		
2002–2003	→ Gebzespor (loan)		
2003–2004	Gebzespor		
2004–2005	Yeniköyspor		
2005–2006	Anadolu Üsküdar 1908		
2006–2007	Balıkesirspor		
2007–2008	Kocaelispor		
2008–2009	Konya Şeker		
2009–2010	Körfezspor		
2010–2011	Balıkesirspor	12	(0)
2011	Körfez	13	(0)
2011–2013	Alanyaspor	43	(1)
2013–2014	Bozüyükspor	13	(0)
2014	Gümüşhanespor	11	(0)
2014–2015	Pendikspor	10	(0)
2015–2016	Leventspor		
- * Club domestic league appearances and goals

İskender Köksal (born 22 August 1981) is a Turkish former professional footballer who played as a defender.

He started his professional career with Beşiktaş and he also played for Yalovaspor, Gebzespor, Yeniköyspor, Anadolu Üsküdar, Balıkesirspor, Kocaelispor, Konya Şekerspor and Balıkesirspor.
