= 2015–16 TFF 2. Lig =

Second League
- Season: 2015-2016
- Champions: White Group; Ümraniyespor; Red Group; Manisaspor
- Promoted: Ümraniyespor; Manisaspor; Bandırmaspor
- Relegated: Bayrampaşaspor; Pazarspor; Orduspor; Kartalspor; Ankara Demirspor; Tarsus İY

The 2015–16 Second League (known as the Spor Toto 2. Lig for sponsorship reasons) is the third level in the Turkish football.

== Teams ==
- Manisaspor, Bucaspor and Orduspor relegated from PTT First League.
- Göztepe, Yeni Malatyaspor and 1461 Trabzon promoted to 2015–16 TFF First League.
- Tuzlaspor, Eyüpspor, Anadolu Üsküdar 1908, İstanbulspor, Sivas Dört Eylül Belediyespor and Ankara Demirspor promoted from TFF Third League.
- Turgutluspor, Körfez İskenderunspor, Ofspor, TKİ Tavşanlı Linyitspor, Gölbaşıspor, Birlik Nakliyat Düzyurtspor and Altay relegated to 2015–16 TFF Third League

=== Locations ===
Locations of teams in 2015–16 TFF Second League
Istanbul TFF Second League football clubs

== White Group ==
=== League table ===
Pos	Team	Pld	W	D	L	GF	GA	GD	Pts	Qualification or relegation
1	Ümraniyespor (P)	34	23	6	5	56	29	+27	75	Promotion to TFF First League
2	İstanbulspor	34	20	11	3	49	20	+29	71	Qualification to Promotion Playoffs
3	Bandırmaspor (P)	34	17	9	8	64	40	+24	60	Qualification to Promotion Playoffs
4	Hacettepe	34	15	12	7	45	28	+17	57	Qualification to Promotion Playoffs
5	Sarıyer	34	15	10	9	37	27	+10	55	Qualification to Promotion Playoffs
6	Menemen Belediyespor	34	14	11	9	49	36	+13	53	
7	Kırklarelispor	34	14	9	11	38	32	+6	51	
8	Nazilli Belediyespor	34	11	15	8	38	30	+8	48	
9	Pendikspor	34	11	12	11	35	35	0	45	
10	Fethiyespor	34	11	11	12	37	39	−2	44	
11	Bugsaşspor	34	11	10	13	29	36	−7	43	
12	Anadolu Selçukspor	34	9	11	14	34	39	−5	38	
13	Hatayspor	34	8	11	15	31	39	−8	35	
14	Kahramanmaraşspor (Note: Kahramanmaraşspor was deducted 3 points.)	34	9	10	15	35	43	−8	34	
15	Anadolu Üsküdar 1908	34	8	10	16	39	49	−10	34	
16	Bayrampaşaspor (R)	34	8	9	17	24	39	−15	33	Relegation to TFF Third League
17	Pazarspor (R)	34	6	6	22	32	80	−48	24	Relegation to TFF Third League
18	Orduspor (Note: Orduspor was deducted 9 points.) (R)	34	5	9	20	28	59	−31	15	Relegation to TFF Third League

Source: TFF Second League page (in Turkish)
(P) Promoted; (R) Relegated

== Red Group ==
=== League table ===
Pos	Team	Pld	W	D	L	GF	GA	GD	Pts	Qualification or relegation
1	Manisaspor (P)	34	19	9	6	41	27	+14	66	Promotion to TFF First League
2	Kocaeli Birlikspor	34	18	8	8	62	37	+25	62	Qualification to Promotion Playoffs
3	Tuzlaspor	34	16	8	10	53	37	+16	56	Qualification to Promotion Playoffs
4	Keçiörengücü	34	15	8	11	45	38	+7	53	Qualification to Promotion Playoffs
5	Gümüşhanespor	34	13	11	10	52	42	+10	50	Qualification to Promotion Playoffs
6	İnegölspor	34	12	13	9	37	31	+6	49	
7	Aydınspor	34	12	12	10	42	36	+6	48	
8	Amed Sportif (Note: Amed Sportif was deducted 3 points.)	34	13	11	10	45	39	+6	47	
9	MKE Ankaragücü (Note: Ankaragücü was deducted 3 points.)	34	12	13	9	40	32	+8	46	
10	Tepecikspor	34	11	10	13	35	37	−2	43	
11	Sivas Belediyespor	34	12	6	16	38	40	−2	42	
12	Tokatspor	34	10	12	12	35	37	−2	42	
13	Eyüpspor	34	11	8	15	39	48	−9	41	
14	Centone Karagümrük	34	11	8	15	32	49	−17	41	
15	Bucaspor (Note: Bucaspor was deducted 3 points.)	34	11	10	13	43	51	−8	40	
16	Kartalspor (R)	34	10	9	15	30	47	−17	39	Relegation to TFF Third League
17	Ankara Demirspor (R)	34	7	10	17	33	50	−17	31	Relegation to TFF Third League
18	Tarsus İdman Yurdu (Note: Tarsus Idman Yurdu was deducted 3 points.) (R)	34	5	10	19	28	52	−24	22	Relegation to TFF Third League

Source: TFF Second League page (in Turkish)
(P) Promoted; (R) Relegated

== Promotion playoffs ==
=== Quarterfinals ===
Team 1	Agg.	Team 2	1st leg	2nd leg
Gümüşhanespor	4–2	Kocaeli Birlikspor	1–1	3–1
Keçiörengücü	5–2	Tuzlaspor	1–2	4–0
Sarıyer	2–4	İstanbulspor	0–2	2–2 (a.e.t.)
Hacettepe	1–2	Bandırmaspor	1–0	0–2

=== Semifinals ===
Team 1	Agg.	Team 2	1st leg	2nd leg
Bandırmaspor	3–0	İstanbulspor	1–0	2–0
Keçiörengücü	2–3	Gümüşhanespor	1–0	1–3

=== Final ===
Team 1	Score	Team 2
Bandırmaspor	2–0	Gümüşhanespor

== See also ==
- 2015–16 Turkish Cup
- 2015–16 Süper Lig
- 2015–16 TFF First League
- 2015–16 TFF Third League
