= Kemalettin Şentürk =

Turkish footballer (born 1970)

Personal information
- Date of birth: 9 February 1970 (age 56)
- Place of birth: Artvin, Turkey
- Height: 1.88 m (6 ft 2 in)
- Position: Sweeper

Senior career*
Years	Team	Apps	(Gls)
1989–1991	Çaykur Rizespor	28	(0)
1991–1993	Gençlerbirliği	51	(8)
1993–2000	Fenerbahçe	157	(22)
1999	→ Ankaragücü (loan)	14	(3)
2000–2001	Diyarbakırspor	25	(11)
2002	Antalyaspor	8	(0)
2003	Kahramanmaraşspor	5	(0)
2004	Osmaniyespor	8	(2)
2004	Kütahyaspor	9	(2)
2005	Mustafakemalpaşa Spor	13	(5)
2005	Kırıkkalespor		
Total		318	(53)

International career
1993–1995	Turkey U21	13	(0)
1995–1996	Turkey	5	(1)

Managerial career
- 2010: Mersin Yurdu
- 2012: Kayseri Erciyesspor
- * Club domestic league appearances and goals

Kemalettin Şentürk (born 9 February 1970) is a Turkish retired footballer who played mainly as a sweeper but also as a defensive midfielder, and a manager.

He spent most of his career at Fenerbahçe, amassing Süper Lig totals of 222 matches and 33 goals over nine seasons. In 2010, he started working as a manager.

== Club career ==
Born in Artvin, Şentürk started his professional career with Çaykur Rizespor in the second division, signing for Gençlerbirliği S.K. in 1991. He transferred to Fenerbahçe S.K. after two seasons, following brilliant displays in the Süper Lig and with the Turkish under-21 national team.

Always an important first-team element, Şentürk contributed with 24 matches and three goals in the 1995–96 campaign as Fenerbahçe lifted the national championship, scoring in a 3–1 home win against runners-up Trabzonspor on 9 December 1995. After a bout of indiscipline he was loaned to MKE Ankaragücü in January 1999, being instrumental in helping them avoid relegation.

Leaving Fenerbahçe in June 2000, Şentürk joined Diyarbakırspor, then made a brief top flight return with Antalyaspor and retired for good in late 2005, after having played for modest clubs: Kahramanmaraşspor, Osmaniyespor, Kütahyaspor, Mustafakemalpaşa Spor and MKE Kırıkkalespor.

== International career ==
Şentürk played five times for Turkey during slightly more than one year, making his debut on 30 August 1995 in a 2–1 friendly home win over Macedonia.

== Honours ==
Fenerbahçe

- Süper Lig: 1995–96
- TSYD Cup: 1993–94, 1994–95
- Atatürk Cup: 1997–98
- Chancellor Cup: 1997–98
- Turkish Cup: Runner-up 1995–96
