= 2008–09 TFF Third League Promotion Group =

TFF 3. Lig - Promotion Group (2008–09)
- Number of Teams: 10; Start Date: January 22, 2009; End Date: May 24, 2009

The TFF Third League or TFF 3. Lig is the fourth level in the Turkish football league system. The top two clubs from Ranking Groups qualify to the Promotion Group of Stage 2. Promotion Group clubs start the second stage without any carryovers.
Top four clubs from the Promotion Group will be promoted to TFF 2. Lig of 2009–2010 season.
Top clubs from the Classifying Groups and the 5th, 6th and 7th clubs from Promotion Group qualify for the Play-off matches to determine the last two teams to be promoted to TFF 2. Lig.

The tables and the results of the teams playing in TFF 3. Lig Promotion Group in 2008–09 season are as follows:

== Teams ==
Location of teams in TFF Third League - Promotion Group (2008–09)

== Standings ==
Pos	Team	Pld	W	D	L	GF	GA	GD	Pts	Promotion or qualification
1	Göztepe	18	12	4	2	24	11	+13	40	Promotion to TFF 2. Lig
2	Tepecik Belediyespor	18	11	5	2	24	13	+11	38	Promotion to TFF 2. Lig
3	TKİ Tavşanlı Linyitspor	18	9	5	4	25	13	+12	32	Promotion to TFF 2. Lig
4	Kahramanmaraşspor	18	10	1	7	33	27	+6	31	Promotion to TFF 2. Lig
5	Ankara Demirspor	18	7	6	5	30	27	+3	27	Qualification to Play-offs
6	Hatayspor	18	6	4	8	24	24	0	22	Qualification to Play-offs
7	Pursaklarspor	18	5	4	9	17	21	−4	19	Qualification to Play-offs
8	Bafra Belediyespor	18	6	1	11	24	30	−6	19	
9	Lüleburgazspor	18	2	9	7	13	22	−9	15	
10	İzmirspor	18	1	3	14	7	33	−26	6	

== Results ==
Home \ Away	ANK	BAF	GÖZ	HAT	İZM	KAH	LÜL	PUR	TAV	TEP
Ankara Demirspor		2–1	1–1	4–2	2–0	1–2	1–1	1–1	4–2	2–2
Bafra Belediyespor	1–2		1–1	2–0	2–1	1–2	2–0	2–1	0–2	2–0
Göztepe	4–1	2–1		1–0	2–1	1–0	0–0	2–1	2–0	2–0
Hatayspor	0–0	4–1	0–1		3–0	2–1	1–1	2–1	0–2	0–1
İzmirspor	2–1	0–4	0–1	0–0		0–2	1–2	0–1	1–1	0–2
Kahramanmaraşspor	2–4	3–2	3–0	2–1	5–1		4–1	1–0	1–2	0–1
Lüleburgazspor	2–2	3–0	0–2	2–4	0–0	0–0		0–1	0–0	0–0
Pursaklarspor	1–2	2–0	1–2	1–4	2–0	1–2	1–1		0–0	0–1
TKİ Tavşanlı Linyitspor	2–0	2–0	0–0	3–0	2–0	4–1	2–0	0–1		1–1
Tepecik Belediyespor	1–0	3–2	1–0	1–1	1–0	5–2	1–0	1–1	2–0	

Legend: Blue = home team win; Yellow = draw; Red = away team win.

== Top scorers ==
- Last updated on May 24, 2009

Scorer	Team	Goals
(Turkey) İsmail Demir	Pursaklarspor	19
(Turkey) Bünyamin Kılınç	Kahramanmaraşspor	17
(Turkey) İsmail Türk	Bafra Belediyespor	17
(Turkey) Erçağ Evirgen	Lüleburgazspor	16
(Turkey) Onur Okan	Kahramanmaraşspor	13
(Turkey) Cihan Yeşilırmak	Ankara Demirspor	12
(Germany) Evren Tozkoparan	Tepecik Belediyespor	12
(Turkey) Hüseyin Kar	TKİ Tavşanlı Linyitspor	12
(Turkey) Eser Şen	Tepecik Belediyespor	11
(Turkey) Hasan Bal	Kahramanmaraşspor	11

== Stadiums ==
Team	Stadium	Capacity
Ankara Demirspor	Cebeci İnönü Stadium	37,000
Pursaklarspor	Cebeci İnönü Stadium	37,000
Göztepe	İzmir Alsancak Stadium	15,358
Göztepe	İzmir Atatürk Stadium	51,295
İzmirspor	İzmir Alsancak Stadium	15,358
Kahramanmaraşspor	Hanefi Mahçiçek Stadium	9,169
Hatayspor	Hatay Atatürk Stadium	6,015
TKİ Tavşanlı Linyitspor	Tavşanlı Ada İlçe Stadium	3,500
Tepecik Belediyespor	Tepecik Belediye Stadium	3,000
Bafra Belediyespor	Bafra Şehir Stadium	2,800
Lüleburgazspor	Lüleburgaz 8 Kasım Stadium	2,500
