= TFF 2. Lig =

- Organising body: Turkish Football Federation (TFF)
- Founded: 2001; 22 years ago
- Country: Turkey
- Confederation: UEFA
- Number of clubs: 36
- Level on pyramid: 3
- Promotion to: 1. Lig
- Relegation to: 3. Lig
- Domestic cup: Turkish Cup
- Current champions: Batman Petrolspor (White Group), Bursaspor (Red Group) (2025–26)
- Broadcaster: Various
- Website: 2. Lig
- Current: 2026–27 TFF 2. Lig

The TFF 2. Lig (lit. 'TFF 2nd League'), currently referred to as Nesine 2. Lig for sponsorship reasons, is the third level in the Turkish football league system. It was founded in the 2001–02 season with the name of Turkish Second League Category B as a continuation of the then second level division. In the 2005–06 season, the name of the league was changed to Lig B. Since the 2007–08 season, the league's current name is used along with sponsor names.

Turkish Second Football League (in Turkish: Türkiye İkinci Futbol Ligi or shortly İkinci Lig or 2. Lig) is a defunct football league in Turkey. It was the second level division in Turkish football since its foundation in 1963–64 until the formation of the new league system in 2001–02. The Second Football League was divided into two categories in the 2001–02 season: Category A and Category B. Since 2007–08, Category A has continued as the TFF First League and Category B has continued as the TFF Second League.

== League status ==
In the 2024–25 season, 36 teams compete in the Red and White Group of the TFF 2. Lig, each consisting of 18 teams. Teams ranked 16th, 17th and 18th of both groups will be relegated. Each group winner earns direct promotion to the TFF 1. Lig. Numbers 2 to 6 of each group enter the promotion play-off, the runner-ups joining the play-offs in the 3rd round. The play-off winners of the Red and White Group will face each other in a single decisive game on neutral ground to get the last ticket for promotion to the TFF 1. Lig..

In the 2009–10 season, the league contained 45 clubs spread out over 3 groups of 11 and one group of 12 teams. The league is played over two rounds. In the first round, ten teams in five groups play with other teams in their group, like a regular season. Top two teams of each group qualify to the "play-off group". They form a play-off league (consisting of ten teams) and play a regular season starting with zero points. The remaining eight teams in each group keep their points and they play again with each other. These new eight-teamed groups are called "classifying groups". The top two teams in each play-off group are promoted to the TFF First League. The three teams classified as third to fifth in each play-off group join the extra play-offs with top teams from each of the five classifying groups. These eight teams play a knockout competition (in a neutral venue) to determine the last team to be promoted. The bottom three teams of the classifying groups are relegated to the TFF Third League. The top four clubs from the Promotion Group of the TFF Third League are then promoted to the TFF Second League, while eight others play in a play-off.

In the 2010–11 season, the league was played with 36 teams in two groups, white and red. The winners of each group are directly promoted to the 1. Lig (TFF First League). In each group 2nd through 5th teams compete in the play-off with the respective team in the other group to determine the finalists. The finalists play a single game to determine the third team to be promoted. The bottom three teams in each group are relegated to the 3. Lig (TFF Third League).

== League history ==
=== 1963–64 Turkish Second Football League ===
League was founded in 1963–64 as a single group with 13 teams.

Promotion and relegation:

Season	Promoted to Turkish First Football League	Relegated to Regional Amateur Leagues
1963–64	Şekerspor	İzmir Demirspor

=== 1964–65 Turkish Second Football League ===
Promotion and relegation:

Season	Promoted to Turkish First Football League	Relegated to Regional Amateur Leagues
1964–65	Vefa	no relegation

=== 1965–66 Turkish Second Football League ===
Promotion and relegation:

Season	Promoted to Turkish First Football League	Relegated to Regional Amateur Leagues
1965–66	Eskişehirspor (final group champions); Altınordu (Final group runners-up)	Yeşildirek (play-off loser)

=== 1966–67 Turkish Second Football League ===
Promotion and relegation:

Season	Promoted to Turkish First Football League	Relegated to Regional Amateur Leagues
1966–67	Mersin İdman Yurdu (Red Group winner and champions of the league); Bursaspor (White Group winner)	Red Group: Beyoğluspor; White Group: Davutpaşa

=== 1967–68 Turkish Second Football League ===
Promotion and relegation:

Season	Promoted to Turkish First Football League	Relegated to Turkish Third Football League
1967–68	İstanbulspor (Red Group winner); İzmirspor (White Group winner and Champions of the league)	Red Group: Petrol Ofisi Spor, Altındağ, Uşakspor; White Group: Kasımpaşa, Malatyaspor, Taksim

=== 1968–69 Turkish Second Football League ===
Promotion and relegation:

Season	Promoted to Turkish First Football League	Relegated to Turkish Third Football League
1968–69	MKE Ankaragücü (Red Group winner and Champions of the league); Samsunspor (White Group winner)	Red Group: Sarıyer, Edirnespor, Karagümrük; White Group: Konyaspor, Beylerbeyi, Kastamonuspor

=== 1969–70 Turkish Second Football League ===
Promotion and relegation:

Season	Promoted to Turkish First Football League	Relegated to Turkish Third Football League
1969–70	Karşıyaka (Red Group winner); Boluspor (White Group winner and champions of the league)	Red Group: Düzcespor; White Group: Ülküspor

=== 1970–71 Turkish Second Football League ===
Promotion and relegation:

Season	Promoted to Turkish First Football League	Relegated to Turkish Third Football League
1970–71	Adanaspor (Red Group winner and champions of the league); Giresunspor (White Group winner)	Red Group: Beykoz, Nazillispor; White Group: Hacettepe, Galata

=== 1971–72 Turkish Second Football League ===
Promotion and relegation:

Season	Promoted to Turkish First Football League	Relegated to Turkish Third Football League
1971–72	PTT (Red Group winner); Şekerspor (White Group winner and champions of the league)	Red Group: İzmirspor, Güneşspor; White Group: Toprak Ofisi, Tarsus İdman Yurdu

=== 1972–73 Turkish Second Football League ===
Promotion and relegation:

Season	Promoted to Turkish First Football League	Relegated to Turkish Third Football League
1972–73	Kayserispor (Red Group winner and champions of the league); Adana Demirspor (White Group winner)	Red Group: DÇ Karabükspor, Afyonspor (1967); White Group: Feriköy, Karşıyaka

=== 1973–74 Turkish Second Football League ===
Promotion and relegation:

Season	Promoted to Turkish First Football League	Relegated to Turkish Third Football League
1973–74	Trabzonspor (Red Group winner); Zonguldakspor (White Group winner and champions of the league)	Red Group: Bandırmaspor, PTT; White Group: Erzurumspor, Lüleburgazspor

=== 1974–75 Turkish Second Football League ===
Promotion and relegation:

Season	Promoted to Turkish First Football League	Relegated to Turkish Third Football League
1974–75	Orduspor (Red Group winner and champions of the league); Balıkesirspor (White Group winner)	Red Group: İstanbulspor; White Group: Uşakspor

=== 1975–76 Turkish Second Football League ===
Promotion and relegation:

Season	Promoted to Turkish First Football League	Relegated to Turkish Third Football League
1975–76	Mersin İdman Yurdu (Red Group winner); Samsunspor (White Group winner and champions of the league)	Red Group: Hatayspor; White Group: Kütahyaspor

=== 1976–77 Turkish Second Football League ===
Promotion and relegation:

Season	Promoted to Turkish First Football League	Relegated to Turkish Third Football League
1976–77	Diyarbakırspor (Red Group winner); MKE Ankaragücü (White Group winner and champions of the league)	Red Group: Malatyaspor; White Group: Çorumspor

=== 1977–78 Turkish Second Football League ===
Promotion and relegation:

Season	Promoted to Turkish First Football League	Relegated to Turkish Third Football League
1977–78	MKE Kırıkkalespor (Red Group winner and champions of the league); Göztepe (White Group winner)	Red Group: Giresunspor, Manisaspor; White Group: İskenderunspor, Altınordu

=== 1978–79 Turkish Second Football League ===
Promotion and relegation:

Season	Promoted to Turkish First Football League	Relegated to Turkish Third Football League
1978–79	Gaziantepspor (Red Group winner and champions of the league); Çaykur Rizespor (White Group winner); Kayserispor (Red Group runners-up and promotion play-off winner)	Red Group: Gençlerbirliği, Konyaspor; White Group: Beykoz

=== 1979–80 Turkish Second Football League ===
Promotion and relegation:

Season	Promoted to Turkish First Football League	Relegated to Turkish Third Football League
1979–80	Mersin İdmanyurdu (Group A winner); Kocaelispor (Group B winner and champions of the league); Boluspor (Group A runners-up and promotion play-off winner)	no relegation

=== 1980–81 Turkish Second Football League ===
Promotion and relegation:

Season	Promoted to Turkish First Football League	Relegated to Turkish Third Football League
1980–81	Göztepe (Group A winner); Sakaryaspor (Group B winner); Diyarbakırspor (Group C winner); MKE Ankaragücü (Turkish Cup champions and Group B runners-up)	no relegation

=== 1981–82 Turkish Second Football League ===
Promotion and relegation:

Season	Promoted to Turkish First Football League	Relegated to Turkish Third Football League
1981–82	Sarıyer (Group A winner); Antalyaspor (Group B winner); Mersin İdman Yurdu (Group C winner); Samsunspor (Group D winner)	Group A: Kırklarelispor; Group B: Ödemişspor; Group C: Elazığspor; Group D: Çorumspor

=== 1982–83 Turkish Second Football League ===
Promotion and relegation:

Season	Promoted to Turkish First Football League	Relegated to Turkish Third Football League
1982–83	Karagümrük (Group A winner); Denizlispor (Group B winner); Gençlerbirliği (Group C winner); Orduspor (Group D winner)	Group A: Beylerbeyi, Davutpaşa, Yedikule, Feriköy, Eyüp; Group B: Uşakspor, Yeşilova, Çanakkalespor, Manisaspor, Tirespor; Group C: DÇ Karabükspor, Konya Ereğlispor, Ankara Demirspor, Amasyaspor, Eskişehir Demirspor; Group D: Hatayspor, TİY Erkutspor, Sivasspor, Tokatspor, Erzincanspor

=== 1983–84 Turkish Second Football League ===
Promotion and relegation:

Season	Promoted to Turkish First Football League	Relegated to Turkish Third Football League
1983–84	Eskişehirspor (Group A winner); Altay (Group B winner); Malatyaspor (Group C winner)	Group A: Beykoz, İstanbulspor; Group B: Ispartaspor, Aydınspor; Group C: Kırşehirspor, Ceyhanspor

=== 1984–85 Turkish Second Football League ===
Promotion and relegation:

Season	Promoted to Turkish First Football League	Relegated to Turkish Third Football League
1984–85	Çaykur Rizespor (Group A winner); Kayserispor (Group B winner and champions of the league); Samsunspor (Group C winner)	Group A: Elazığspor, Şanlıurfaspor; Group B: Kütahyaspor, Sitespor; Group C: Süleymaniye Sirkeci, Alibeyköyspor

=== 1985–86 Turkish Second Football League ===
Promotion and relegation:

Season	Promoted to Turkish First Football League	Relegated to Turkish Third Football League
1985–86	Diyarbakırspor (Group A winner); Boluspor (Group B winner); Antalyaspor (Group C winner)	Group A: Hopaspor, Sivasspor, Mardinspor, Giresunspor; Group B: Balıkesirspor, Vestel Manisa, Burdurspor, E.S. Alüminyumspor; Group C: Galata, Tekirdağspor, Lüleburgazspor, Gölcükgücü

=== 1986–87 Turkish Second Football League ===
Promotion and relegation:

Season	Promoted to Turkish First Football League	Relegated to Turkish Third Football League
1986–87	Adana Demirspor (Group A winner); Karşıyaka (Group B winner); Sakaryaspor (Group C winner)	Group A: Reyhanlıspor, Osmaniyespor, Elazığspor; Group B: Sökespor, Kırşehirspor, Düzce Kervan Doğsan, Bandırmaspor; Group C: Anadolu, Vefa Simtel, Çanakkalespor, Silivrispor

=== 1987–88 Turkish Second Football League ===
Promotion and relegation:

Season	Promoted to Turkish First Football League	Relegated to Turkish Third Football League
1987–88	Adanaspor (Group A winner); Kahramanmaraşspor (Group B winner); Konyaspor (Group C winner)	Group A: MKE Kırıkkalespor, Niğdespor, Bayburtspor; Group B: Tarsus İdman Yurdu, Uşakspor, Ünyespor; Group C: İzmirspor, Fatih Karagümrük, Kırklarelispor

=== 1988–89 Turkish Second Football League ===
Promotion and relegation:

Season	Promoted to Turkish First Football League	Relegated to Turkish Third Football League
1988–89	Gençlerbirliği (Group A winner); No promotion in Group B (Bursaspor II won); Zeytinburnuspor (Group C winner)	Group A: Mardinspor, Bitlisspor, Kayserispor; Group B: Zonguldakspor, Sönmez Filament, Yeni Afyonspor, Trabzonspor II; Group C: Babaeskispor, Çorluspor, Düzcespor, Uzunköprüspor

=== 1989–90 Turkish Second Football League ===
Promotion and relegation:

Season	Promoted to Turkish First Football League	Relegated to Turkish Third Football League
1989–90	Bakırköyspor (Group A winner); Aydınspor (Group B winner); Gaziantepspor (Group C winner)	Group A: Bartınspor, Çarşambaspor, Bulancakspor; Group B: Trakya Birlik Edirnespor, Menemenspor, Ispartaspor; Group C: İskenderunspor, Şanlıurfaspor, Erzincanspor

=== 1990–91 Turkish Second Football League ===
Promotion and relegation:

Season	Promoted to Turkish First Football League	Relegated to Turkish Third Football League
1990–91	Samsunspor (Group A winner); Altay (Group B winner); Adana Demirspor (Group C winner)	Group A: Giresunspor, Sümerbank Beykoz, Akçaabat Sebatspor; Group B: Kütahyaspor, Kuşadasıspor, Yeni Afyonspor; Group C: Nevşehirspor, Niğdespor, Polatlıspor

=== 1991–92 Turkish Second Football League ===
Promotion and relegation:

Season	Promoted to Turkish First Football League	Relegated to Turkish Third Football League
1991–92	Kocaelispor (Group A winner); Karşıyaka (Group B winner and champions of the league); Kayserispor (Group C winner)	Group A: Eskişehirspor, Fatih Karagümrük, Kasımpaşa; Group B: Bozüyükspor, Altınordu, Gönenspor; Group C: Hatayspor, Elazığspor, Şekerspor

=== 1992–93 Turkish Second Football League ===
Promotion and relegation:

Season	Promoted to Turkish First Football League	Relegated to Turkish Third Football League
1992–93	Samsunspor (promotion group first place); Zeytinburnuspor (promotion group second place); DÇ Karabükspor (promotion group third place)	Group 1: İnegölspor, Bandırmaspor, Küçükçekmecespor; Group 2: Manisaspor, Yeni Nazillispor, İzmirspor; Group 3: Keçiörengücü, Mudurnuspor; Group 4: Çaykur Rizespor, Akçaabat Sebatspor, Bafraspor; Group 5: Kahramanmaraşspor, Batman Belediyespor

=== 1993–94 Turkish Second Football League ===
Promotion and relegation:

Season	Promoted to Turkish First Football League	Relegated to Turkish Third Football League
1993–94	Petrolofisi (promotion group first place); Denizlispor (promotion group second place); Vanspor (promotion group third place); Adana Demirspor (extra play-off winner and promotion group 5th); Antalyaspor (extra play-off winner and promotion group 6th)	Group 1: Yalovaspor, Eyüpspor; Group 2: Sökespor, Ayvalıkgücü; Group 3: Yeni Yozgatspor, Kütahyaspor; Group 4: PTT, Ünyespor; Group 5: Muşspor, İskenderunspor

=== 1994–95 Turkish Second Football League ===
Promotion and relegation:

Season	Promoted to Turkish First Football League	Relegated to Turkish Third Football League
1994–95	Karşıyaka (promotion group first place); İstanbulspor (promotion group second place); Eskişehirspor (extra play-off winner and promotion group 3rd)	Group 1: İstanbul Büyükşehir Belediyespor, Üsküdar Anadolu; Group 2: Muğlaspor, Manisaspor; Group 3: Ispartaspor, Tarsus İdman Yurdu; Group 4: Giresunspor, Erdemir Ereğlispor; Group 5: Yeni Sincanspor, Batman Belediyespor

=== 1995–96 Turkish Second Football League ===
Promotion and relegation:

Season	Promoted to Turkish First Football League	Relegated to Turkish Third Football League
1995–96	Çanakkale Dardanelspor (promotion group first place); Sarıyer (promotion group second place); Zeytinburnuspor (extra play-off winner and classification group 1 winner)	Group 1: Çorluspor, Lüleburgazspor; Group 2: Fethiyespor, Bergamaspor; Group 3: Beypazarı Belediyespor, Mersinspor; Group 4: Boluspor, Orduspor; Group 5: Petrol Ofisi, Kahramanmaraşspor

=== 1996–97 Turkish Second Football League ===
Promotion and relegation:

Season	Promoted to Turkish First Football League	Relegated to Turkish Third Football League
1996–97	KDÇ Karabükspor (promotion group first place); Kayserispor (promotion group second place); Şekerspor (extra play-off winner and classification group 4 winner)	Group 1: Nişantaşı, Anadoluhisarı İdman Yurdu; Group 2: Muğlaspor, Balıkesirspor; Group 3: İnegölspor, Alanyaspor; Group 4: Ünyespor; Group 5: İskenderunspor, Bingölspor

=== 1997–98 Turkish Second Football League ===
Promotion and relegation:

Season	Promoted to Turkish First Football League	Relegated to Turkish Third Football League
1997–98	Erzurumspor (promotion group first place); Adanaspor (promotion group second place); Sakaryaspor (extra play-off winner and promotion group 5th)	Group 1: Kemerspor, Gaziosmanpaşaspor; Group 2: Turgutluspor, Yeni Afyonspor; Group 3: Düzcespor, Beylerbeyi; Group 4: Keçiörengücü, Çorumspor; Group 5: PTT, Siirt Köy Hizmetleri YSE Spor

=== 1998–99 Turkish Second Football League ===
Promotion and relegation:

Season	Promoted to Turkish First Football League	Relegated to Turkish Third Football League
1998–99	Vanspor (promotion group first place); Denizlispor (promotion group second place); Göztepe (extra play-off winner and promotion group 3rd)	Group 1: Adana Demirspor, Kilimli Belediyespor; Group 2: Petrol Ofisi, Soma Linyitspor; Group 3: Zonguldakspor, Edirnespor; Group 4: Erzincanspor, Gümüşhane Doğanspor; Group 5: Ankara Demirspor, Fırat Üniversitesi

=== 1999–2000 Turkish Second Football League ===
Promotion and relegation:

Season	Promoted to Turkish First Football League	Relegated to Turkish Third Football League
1999–2000	Yimpaş Yozgatspor (promotion group first place); Siirt JET-PA (promotion group second place); Çaykur Rizespor (extra play-off winner and promotion group 3rd)	Group 1: Zeytinburnuspor; Group 2: Kuşadasıspor, Marmarisspor; Group 3: Pendikspor, Kasımpaşa; Group 4: Giresunspor, Orduspor; Group 5: Adıyamanspor, Malatya Belediyespor

=== 2000–01 Turkish Second Football League ===
Promotion and relegation:

Season	Promoted to Turkish First Football League	Relegated to Turkish Third Football League
2000-01	Göztepe (promotion group first place); Diyarbakırspor (promotion group second place); Malatyaspor (extra play-off winner and classification group 5 winner)	Group 1: Bakırköyspor; Group 2: Yeni Salihlispor; Group 3: Çorluspor; Group 4: Düzcespor; Group 5: Ankara ASAŞ Spor

Source: Cem Pekin Archives and TFF and mackolik.com.

== Past promotion since 2001–02 ==
Regional Group System

Season	A Group Leader	B Group Leader	C Group Leader
2002–03	Karşıyaka	Türk Telekom	Kayseri Erciyesspor
2003–04	Fatih Karagümrük	Sarıyer	Mardinspor
2004–05	Uşakspor	Orduspor	Gaziantep Büyükşehir Belediyespor

Promotion–Classification Group System

Season	Winners	Runners-up	Playoff Winners
2001–02	Manisaspor	Mersin İdman Yurdu	Adana Demirspor
2005–06	Kasımpaşa	Gençlerbirliği OFTAŞ	Eskişehirspor
2006–07	Boluspor	Kartalspor	Giresunspor
2007–08	Adanaspor	Kardemir Karabükspor	Güngören Belediyespor
2008–09	Bucaspor	Mersin İdman Yurdu	Çanakkale Dardanelspor
2009–10	Güngören Belediyespor	Akhisar Belediyespor	TKİ Tavşanlı Linyitspor

Dual Group System

Season	Red Group Winners	White Group Winners	Playoff Winners
2010–11	Elazığspor	Göztepe	Sakaryaspor
2011–12	1461 Trabzon	Şanlıurfaspor	Adana Demirspor
2012–13	Kahramanmaraşspor	Balıkesirspor	Fethiyespor
2013–14	Altınordu	Giresunspor	Alanyaspor
2014–15	Göztepe	Yeni Malatyaspor	1461 Trabzon
2015–16	Ümraniyespor	Manisaspor	Bandırmaspor
2016–17	MKE Ankaragücü	İstanbulspor	BB Erzurumspor
2017–18	Hatayspor	Altay	Afjet Afyonspor
2018–19	Menemen Belediyespor	Keçiörengücü	Fatih Karagümrük
2019–20	Bandırmaspor	Samsunspor	Tuzlaspor
2020–21	Eyüpspor	Manisa	Kocaelispor
2021–22	Sakaryaspor	Pendikspor	Bodrumspor
2022–23	Çorum	Kocaelispor	Şanlıurfaspor
2023–24	Amedspor	Esenler Erokspor	Iğdır
2024–25	Serik Belediyespor	Sarıyer	Vanspor

== Past relegation since 2001–02 ==
Regional Group System

Season	Group A	Group B	Group C
2002–03	Gaziosmanpaşaspor, Kütahyaspor	Çubukspor, Tokatspor	Hakkarispor, Silopi Cudispor
2003–04	Sidespor, Mustafakemalpaşaspor	Amasyaspor, Gümüşhanespor	Mezitlispor, Iğdırspor
2004–05	Göztepe, Çorluspor	Bulancakspor, Şekerspor	Erzincanspor, Karamanspor

Promotion–Classification Group System

Season	Group 1	Group 2	Group 3	Group 4	Group 5
2001–02	Zeytinburnuspor, Sapancaspor	Ispartaspor, Yeni Turgutluspor	Konya Mobellaspor, Kırklarelispor	Boluspor, Artvin Hopaspor	Vanspor, Ağrıspor
2005–06	Yıldırım Bosnaspor, Üsküdar Anadolu	Aydınspor, Adanaspor (Adanaspor didn't field first two games and were officially relegated)	Aksarayspor, Bursa Merinosspor	Ankara Demirspor, Zonguldakspor	Osmaniyespor, Batman Petrolspor
2006–07	Yalovaspor, Oyak Renault G.S.D.	Nazilli Belediyespor, Muğlaspor	Keçiörengücü, Darıca Gençlerbirliği	Tokatspor, Ünyespor	Siirtspor, Cizrespor
2007–08	İnegölspor, Fatih Karagümrük	İzmirspor, Uşakspor	Küçükköyspor, Tepecik Belediyespor	Araklıspor, Erzincanspor	Kahramanmaraşspor, Hatayspor
2008–09	Gaziosmanpaşaspor, Darıca Gençlerbirliği, Beylerbeyi	Altınordu, Marmaris Belediyespor, Afyonkarahisarspor	Kırıkkalespor, Maltepespor, Alibeyköyspor	Pazarspor, Arsinspor, Yimpaş Yozgatspor	GASKİ, Şanlıurfa Belediyespor, Malatya Belediyespor
2009–10	Yalovaspor, Beykoz 1908, Zeytinburnuspor	Tepecikspor, İstanbulspor, Denizli Belediyespor	Karsspor, Kırşehirspor, Erzurumspor (Erzurumspor didn't field first two games of 2nd stage and were officially relegated)	Diyarbakır Büyükşehir Belediyespor, Kahramanmaraşspor, Malatyaspor	

Dual Group System

Season	Relegated teams from Red Group	Relegated teams from White Group
2010–11	Türk Telekom (Withdrew from leagues after that season), Tarsus İdman Yurdu, Belediye Vanspor, Çanakkale Dardanelspor	Akçaabat Sebatspor, Hacettepe, Gebzespor
2011–12	Altınordu, Adıyamanspor, Mardinspor	Diyarbakırspor, Çorumspor, Kocaelispor
2012–13	Ünyespor, Sakaryaspor	Denizli Belediyespor, Çamlıdere Şekerspor
2013–14	Eyüpspor, Güngören Belediyespor, Bozüyükspor	Çanakkale Dardanelspor, Gaziosmanpaşaspor, Çankırıspor
2014–15	Gölbaşıspor, Birlik Nakliyat Düzyurtspor, Altay	Körfez İskenderunspor, Turgutluspor, Ofspor, TKİ Tavşanlı Linyitspor
2015–16	Kartalspor, Ankara Demirspor, Tarsus İdman Yurdu	Bayrampaşaspor, Pazarspor, Orduspor
2016–17	Aydınspor 1923, 1461 Trabzon, Kayseri Erciyesspor	Anadolu Üsküdar 1908, Tepecikspor, Ofspor
2017–18	Bucaspor, Kocaeli Birlik, Mersin İdman Yurdu	Nazilli Belediyespor, Karşıyaka, Silivrispor
2018–19	Fethiyespor, Tokatspor, Darıca Gençlerbirliği	Bayrampaşaspor, Manisaspor, Gaziantepspor
2019–20	No relegation due to COVID-19	No relegation due to COVID-19
2020–21	Elazığspor, Mamak FK, Kardemir Karabükspor	Gümüşhanespor, Sancaktepe FK, Hacettepe
2021–22	Turgutluspor, Ergene Velimeşe, Niğde Anadolu, Kahramanmaraşspor	Akhisarspor, 1922 Konyaspor, Eskişehirspor
2022–23	Batman Petrolspor, Tarsus İdman Yurdu, Bayburt Özel İdarespor, Sivas Belediyespor	Balıkesirspor, Pazarspor
2023–24	Etimesgut Belediyespor, Düzcespor, Denizlispor, Uşakspor	Zonguldak Kömürspor, Kırşehir, Bursaspor, Adıyaman

== See also ==
- Süper Lig
- TFF 1. Lig
- TFF 3. Lig
- Turkish Regional Amateur League
- Turkish Amateur Football Leagues
- Turkish Cup
