= Üstün Bilgi =

Turkish footballer

Personal information
- Date of birth: 30 May 1988 (age 38)
- Place of birth: Bursa, Turkey
- Height: 1.84 m (6 ft 0 in)
- Position: Forward

Team information
- Current team: Kepez Spor Futbol
- Number: 12

Youth career
- Bursa Merinosspor
- Bursa Güven
- Bursaspor

Senior career*
Years	Team	Apps	(Gls)
2007–2011	Bursaspor	0	(0)
2007–2008	→ Bursa Merinosspor (loan)	21	(4)
2008–2009	→ Mustafakemalpaşa Spor (loan)	27	(12)
2009–2010	→ Yeşil Bursa SK (loan)	30	(14)
2010–2011	→ Körfez İskenderunspor (loan)	5	(0)
2011	Yeşil Bursa SK		
2011–2012	Kızılcahamamspor	30	(24)
2012–2016	Kayseri Erciyesspor	39	(7)
2013	→ Denizlispor (loan)	14	(2)
2014–2015	→ Kocaeli Birlik Spor (loan)	28	(9)
2016–2018	Altınordu	15	(4)
2017–2018	Bandırmaspor	29	(6)
2018	Fethiyespor	14	(6)
2018–2019	Bayrampaşaspor	14	(3)
2019	Bandırmaspor	16	(4)
2019	Amed SK	11	(7)
2020–2021	Kırşehir Belediyespor	35	(19)
2021–2022	Amed SK	32	(10)
2022–2023	Serik Belediyespor	27	(11)
2023–	Kepez Spor Futbol	2	(1)
- * Club domestic league appearances and goals as of 17 September 2023

Üstün Bilgi (born 30 May 1988) is a Turkish footballer who plays as a forward for TFF Third League club Kepez Spor Futbol.
