= Yasin Avcı (footballer, born 1983) =

Turkish footballer

Personal information
- Full name: Yasin Avcı
- Date of birth: April 10, 1983 (age 43)
- Place of birth: Tire, İzmir, Turkey
- Height: 1.80 m (5 ft 11 in)
- Position: Right winger

Team information
- Current team: Tirespor

Youth career
- 1999–2000: Tirespor
- 2000–2003: Altay

Senior career*
Years	Team	Apps	(Gls)
2003–2004	Göztepe	23	(6)
2004–2009	Altay	153	(24)
2009–2011	Karabükspor	45	(18)
2011–2013	Göztepe	14	(0)
2013	Bucaspor	14	(9)
2013–2014	Şanlıurfaspor	16	(1)
2014–2015	Bucaspor	29	(3)
2016	Menemen Belediyespor	4	(0)
2016–	Tirespor	2	(0)
- * Club domestic league appearances and goals as of 2 August 2015

Yasin Avcı (born 10 April 1983) is a Turkish professional footballer who plays as a right winger for Tirespor.
