= Dumlupınar Stadium =

Multi-purpose stadium in Kütahya, Turkey

Coordinates: 39.4183°N 29.9917°E

- Interactive map of Dumlupınar Stadium
- Location: Kütahya, Turkey
- Owner: Ministry of Youth and Sports
- Capacity: 7,058
- Surface: Turf

Construction
- Opened: 1938
- Renovated: 2006, 2010, 2019

Tenant
- Kütahyaspor

Dumlupınar Stadium is a multi-purpose stadium in Kütahya, Turkey. It is currently used mostly for football matches and is the home ground of TFF Third League team Belediye Kütahyaspor.

The stadium was built in 1938 and currently holds 11,495 people.

With the promotion of TKİ Tavşanlı Linyitspor to the Turkish TFF First League at the end of the 2009–2010 season, the stadium became their home ground.
