= Isparta Atatürk Stadium =

Multi-purpose stadium in Isparta, Turkey

Isparta Atatürk Şehir Stadyumu
- Isparta Atatürk Stadium
- Interactive map of Isparta Atatürk Şehir Stadyumu
- Location: Isparta, Turkey
- Coordinates: 37°46′05″N 30°33′40″E
- Capacity: 4,345
- Surface: Grass

Construction
- Opened: 1950
- Renovated: 1974

Tenants
- Ispartaspor, Emrespor

Isparta Atatürk Şehir Stadyumu is a multi-purpose stadium in Isparta, Turkey. It is currently used mostly for football matches and is the home ground of Turkish Regional Amateur League team Ispartaspor.

The stadium was built in 1950 and currently holds 4,345 people.

With the promotion of Emrespor to the Turkish TFF Third League at the end of the 2011–2012 season, the stadium became their home ground.
