= Sitespor =

Turkish sports club

- Full name: Sitespor
- Founded: 1969
- Ground: Cebeci İnönü Stadium, Ankara
- Capacity: 15,000
- League: Amatör Futbol Ligleri
Home colours	Away colours

Sitespor is a Turkish sports club based in Ankara, mainly concentrated on football.

Sitespor is currently playing in the Amatör Futbol Ligleri.

== Kits ==
The club plays in orange and black kits.

== Stadium ==
Currently the team plays at the 15000 capacity Cebeci İnönü Stadium.

== League participations ==
- TFF Second League: 1981–1985
- TFF Third League:1970–1974, 1985–1990
