= Uşakspor =

Turkish football club

- Full name: Uşakspor
- Nickname: Aşigolar
- Founded: June 1st 1967
- Dissolved: July 2010
- Ground: 1 Eylül Stadium, Uşak, Turkey
- Capacity: 5.944
- 2008–09: TFF Third League, withdrew after ranking group stage
Home colours	Away colours

Uşakspor was a Turkish football club located in Uşak. They play their home games at 1 Eylül Stadium in Uşak. The club was founded in 1967 and played in Second League between 1967 and 1968, 1970–1975, 1982–1983, 1987–1988, 2005–2007. It suffered financial problems and the team was relegated to the Third League over two seasons. It finally withdrew after 18 matches and will be played in Amateur League at next season. Uşakspor gave its competitive rights to Uşak Belediyespor (now known as Utaş Uşakspor) in 2008 and the club finally was dissolved in July 2010.

== Participations ==
TFF First League: 1967–68, 1970–75, 1982–83, 1987–88, 2005–07

TFF Second League: 1968–70, 1975–79, 1984–87, 1988–2005, 2007–08

TFF Third League: 2008–09

Turkish Regional Amateur League: 1979–82, 1983–84, 2009–
