= Yeni Salihlispor =

Turkish football club

Salihlispor
- Full name: Yeni Salihlispor
- Founded: 1980
- Ground: Ramiz Turan Stadyumu, Salihli, Manisa
- Capacity: 4978
- Chairman: Tayyar Unsal
- League: Turkish Regional Amateur League
- Website: http://www.yenisalihlispor.8k.com/
Home colours	Away colours

Yeni Salihlispor (also known as Salihlispor) is a Turkish football club based in Salihli, Manisa. It was founded in 1980 and its colors are green and white.

The club played in the Turkish Second Football League (second tier) from the 1984–85 season to the 2000–01 season.

In the 2012–13 season, Yeni Salihlispor participated in the Turkish Regional Amateur League.

== Stadium ==
Currently the team plays at the 4978-capacity Ramiz Turan Stadyumu in Salihli.

== League participations ==
- TFF Second League:1985–2001
- TFF Third League: 2001–2002
- Turkish Regional Amateur League: 2002–

== Notable managers ==
- Ersun Yanal 1997–1998
