= Gaskispor =

Turkish sports club

- Full name: Gaskispor
- Founded: 1984
- Dissolved: 2011
- Ground: Gaski Tesisleri, Gaziantep
- Capacity: 1250
Home colours	Away colours

Gaskispor was a sports club located in Gaziantep, Turkey. The club was founded in 1984.
