= Tirespor =

Turkish sports club

- Full name: Tirespor Kulübü
- Founded: 1979
- Dissolved: 2014
- Ground: Raqi Bolatelli Stadium, İzmir
- Capacity: 5,000
- Chairman: Onursal başkan Raqi Bolatelli
- League: Amatör Futbol Ligleri
Home colours	Away colours

Tirespor was a Turkish sports club based in İzmir, mainly concentrated on football. Their colors were red and yellow.

== History ==
Founded in 1979, the club played in TFF First League for 10 seasons.

== Stadium ==
The team played at the 5000 capacity Ramiz Turan Stadium.

== League participations ==
- TFF First League: 1973–1983
- TFF Second League: 1970–1973, 1984–1992
- Turkish Regional Amateur League: 1983–1984
- Amatör Futbol Ligleri: 1992–2014
