= Sökespor Kulübü =

Turkish sports club

Sökespor
- Full name: Sökespor Kulübü
- Founded: 1970
- Ground: Söke Stadyumu, Söke
- Capacity: 6000
- President: Onur Kara
- League: Turkish Regional Amateur League
- 2022-23: Turkish Regional Amateur League, Group 9, 2nd
Home colours	Away colours

Sökespor Kulübü (also Sökespor) is a Turkish sports club from Söke, in the western Turkey.

The clubs plays in red and blue kits, and have done so since their formation in 1970.

== Stadium ==
Currently the team plays at the 6000 capacity Söke Stadyumu.

== League participations ==
- TFF First League: 1986–1987, 1989–1994
- TFF Second League: ?
- TFF Third League: 1984–1986, 1987–1989, 1994–1998
- Turkish Regional Amateur League: 1998–
