= Iğdırspor =

Turkish football club

- Founded: 1952
- Dissolved: 2014
- Ground: Kadir Mugan Stad, Iğdır
- Capacity: 5,000
- League: Süper Amatör Lig
Home colours	Away colours

Iğdırspor is a former football team of Iğdır, Turkey.

They were founded in 1952 and played in the TFF Second League between 2001 and 2006. The club dissolved in 2014.

== Kits ==
The clubs played in green and white kits.

== Stadium ==
The team played at the 5000 capacity Iğdır Şehir Stadyumu.

== League participations ==
- TFF Second League:2001–2004
- TFF Third League: 1990–1991, 1997–01, 2004–07
- Turkish Regional Amateur League: 1952–90, 1991–97, 2007–2014

== See also ==
- Iğdır F.K.
