= Artvin Hopaspor =

Turkish football club

- Full name: Artvin Hopaspor Kulübü
- Founded: 1961; 64 years ago
- Ground: Hopa İlçe Stadı, Hopa
- Capacity: 3,000
- Chairman: Göksel Cihan
- Manager: Ertürk Koray Balcıoğlu
- League: TFF 3. Lig
- 2024–25: TFF 3. Lig, Group 1, 8th
- Website: http://www.artvinhopaspor.com/
Home colours	Away colours

Artvin Hopaspor is a Turkish football club from Hopa, Artvin Province which plays in the TFF Third League. The club plays in white and purple kits, and have done so since their formation in 1961.

== League participations ==
- TFF Second League: 1996–2002
- TFF Third League: 1992–1996, 2002–2008

== Stadium ==
The team have been playing their home matches at Arhavi İlçe Stadı since 2024 due to the ongoing renovation of their previous stadium, Hopa İlçe Stadı.
