= Pazarspor =

Turkish sports club

- Full name: Pazarspor
- Founded: 1973
- Ground: Pazar İlçe Stadium, Pazar, Rize
- Capacity: 2,500
- Chairman: Hüseyin Yangın
- Manager: Cafer Aydın
- League: TFF 3. Lig
- 2025–26: TFF 3. Lig, Group 3, 7th of 16
- Website: https://pazarspor.org.tr/
Home colours	Away colours

Pazarspor is a Turkish sports club located in the town of Pazar in Rize Province. The football club plays in the TFF Second League. It was founded in 1973 by the people of Rize, Pazar.

== Current squad ==
As of 13 January 2023

Note: Flags indicate national team as defined under FIFA eligibility rules; some limited exceptions apply. Players may hold more than one non-FIFA nationality.

No.	Pos.	Nation	Player
1	GK	TUR	Yasin Davuş
4	DF	TUR	Eyüp Ensar Bozkurt
5	DF	TUR	Bedirhan Özyurt (on loan from İstanbul Başakşehir)
6	MF	TUR	Muhammet Nişancı
8	MF	TUR	Maksut Birben
9	FW	TUR	Oğuzhan Birben
10	FW	TUR	İsmail Düzgün
11	FW	TUR	Eray Yüksel
12	MF	TUR	Sercan Besler
17	MF	TUR	Oğuzhan Eskiköy
19	DF	BEL	Emre Zeycan
31	DF	TUR	Başar Çakıcıoğlu
32	GK	SUI	Serkan Polat

No.	Pos.	Nation	Player
34	GK	TUR	Doğukan Özkan (on loan from Antalyaspor)
41	MF	TUR	Yağız Aktaş
47	DF	AZE	Metin Güler (on loan from Amed)
50	DF	BEL	Hamza Kaya
53	GK	TUR	Erdem Karahan
58	DF	TUR	Mehmet Çiçek
64	MF	SUI	Ahmet Karataş
70	DF	TUR	Enes Demiroğlu
77	DF	TUR	Hakan Doğru
80	DF	TUR	Onur Kızıltaş
99	FW	TUR	Önder Selimoğlu

=== Out on loan ===
Note: Flags indicate national team as defined under FIFA eligibility rules; some limited exceptions apply. Players may hold more than one non-FIFA nationality.

No.	Pos.	Nation	Player
—	DF	TUR	Muhammet Ensar Çavuşoğlu (at Elazığspor until 30 June 2023)
