= Kırşehirspor =

Turkish sports club

- Full name: Kırşehir Spor Kulübü
- Founded: 1984
- Dissolved: 2013
- Ground: Ahi Stadium, Kırşehir
- Capacity: 7,500
- Chairman: Enes yesiloglu
- League: Turkish Amateur Football Leagues
Home colours	Away colours

Kırşehirspor with club code 000212 was a sports club located in Kirşehir, Turkey. It was founded as Kırşehirspor in 1969 and later dissolved. The current Kırşehirspor name and club, with club code 010954, is the changed name of Yeni Kırşehirspor, founded in 1984. It was renamed as PETLAS Kırşehirspor in 1999 and Yeni Kırşehirspor in 2001.

Kırşehir Belediyespor founded in 2013 as Yeşil Kırşehirspor, with club code 010945 is another club from Kırşehir.

== Attendances ==
- TFF First League: 1982–84, 1986–87
- TFF Second League: 1969–75, 1984–86, 1987–93, 1999–01, 2003–09
- TFF Third League: 2001–03, 2009–11
- Turkish Regional Amateur League: 2011–
