= Bulancakspor =

Turkish football club

- Full name: Bulancakspor
- Nickname: The Red Devils
- Founded: March 28, 1926
- Dissolved: 2011
- Ground: Bulancak Stadium Bulancak, Turkey
- Capacity: 3,000
- Chairman: (Turkey) Necmi Sıbıç
Home colours	Away colours

Bulancakspor, established in 1926, is a old Turkish association football club based in Bulancak, Giresun Province.

Bulancakspor has won the FIFA fairplay prize for getting no red cards during 101 games from 1990 till 1994.

== League participations ==
- TFF First League: 1989–1990
- TFF Second League: 1984–1989, 1990–2005
- TFF Third League: 2005
- Regional Amateur League: 2010-2011
- Amateur League: 1926-1984
