= Erzincanspor =

Turkish sports club

- Full name: Erzincanspor
- Founded: 1968
- Dissolved: 2014
- Ground: 13 Şubat Şehir Stadium, Erzincan
- Capacity: 6000
- 2011–12: Erzincan Amateur League, 1st
Home colours	Away colours

Erzincanspor was a sports club located in Erzincan, Turkey. The football club played in the Iddaa League B in 2007–2008 season and relegated to Third League in 2008 and Erzincan Amateur League in 2008–2009 season. The club folded in 2014, and is unofficially succeeded by 24 Erzincanspor.

== History ==
The club withdrew from the 1991-92 3. Lig on the 24th week after the 1992 Erzincan earthquake.

== League participations ==
- TFF First League: 1980–1983, 1985–1990, 1995–1999
- TFF Second League: 1969–1980, 1984–1985, 1990–1995, 1999–2005, 2006–2008
- TFF Third League: 2005–2006, 2008–2009
- Turkish Regional Amateur League: 2010–11, 2012–2014
- Amatör Futbol Ligleri: 1983–1984, 2009–2010, 2011–2012
