= Kütahyaspor =

Turkish sports club

- Full name: Kütahyaspor Futbol Spor Kulübü
- Founded: 1966
- Ground: Dumlupınar Stadium, Kütahya
- Capacity: 11,500
- President: Ramazan Yıldırım
- Manager: Polat Çetin
- League: TFF 3. Lig
- 2022–23: TFF 3. Lig, Group 1, 3rd
Home colours	Away colours

Kütahyaspor is a Turkish sports club from Kütahya, in western Turkey.

The clubs plays in blue and light blue kits, and have done so since their formation in 1966.

== League participations ==
- 1st League: 1966–1976, 1980–1985, 1987–1991, 1992–1994
- 2nd League: 1976–1978, 1979–1980, 1985–1987, 1991–1992, 1994–2003
- 3rd League: 2003–2008, 2016–2017, 2020–
- Regional Amateur League: 2010–2016, 2017–2020
- Amateur Level: 1978–1979, 2008–2010

== Stadium ==
Currently the team plays at the 11,500 capacity Dumlupınar Stadium.
