= Marmaris Belediye GSK =

Turkish sports club

Marmaris Gençlikspor
- Full name: Marmaris Gençlikspor Turizm ve Ticaret A.Ş.
- Founded: 1931
- Ground: Marmaris İlçe; Marmaris, Muğla
- Capacity: 1,400
- Chairman: Hüseyin Deryal
- Manager: Doğan Şahin
- League: Muğla Super Amateur League
- 2025–26: 7th Group A
- Website: https://marmarisgenclikspor.com/
Home colours	Away colours

Marmaris Gençlikspor is a Turkish sports club based in Marmaris, Muğla. The club colors are black and white.

== History ==
The club was founded in 1931 as Marmarisspor. After competing as Marmaris Belediyespor the club plays under the name Marmaris Gençlikspor.

== League participations ==
- TFF First League: 1997–2000
- TFF Second League: 2001–2009
- TFF Third League: 1986–1997, 2000–2001, 2009–2010
- Amateur Leagues: 1931–1986, 2011–2020, 2021–

== Honours ==
TFF 3. Lig

Winners (1): 1996–97
Runners-up (1): 2000–01
