= Gebzespor =

Turkish sports club

Güzide Gebzespor
- Full name: Güzide Gebze Spor Kulübü
- Nickname: Violets
- Founded: 19 May 1955
- Ground: Alaettin Kurt Stadium, Gebze
- Capacity: 15,462
- Chairman: Yusuf İzzettin Öztürk
- Manager: Besim Durmuş
- League: TFF 2. Lig
- 2025–26: Turkish Regional Amateur League, Group 9, 11th (was not relegated)
Home colours	Away colours	Third colours

Güzide Gebzespor is a Turkish sports club located in Gebze, Turkey. The football club plays in the TFF 2. Lig. They have a local rivalry with Kocaelispor.

== League participations ==
- TFF Second League (6): 2006–11, 2025–present
- TFF Third League (24): 1984–2006, 2011–12, 2018–19
- TFF Regional Amateur League (13): 2012–18, 2019–2025
- Turkish Amateur League (29): 1955–84
