= 72 Batmanspor =

Turkish football team

- Full name: 72 Batman Spor Kulübü
- Founded: 1986
- League: Turkish Amateur League
- 2009–10: 5th class'f group, 6th place
Home colours	Away colours

72 Batmanspor, formerly Batman Belediyespor, is a Turkish sports club based in Batman. The football club plays in the Turkish Amateur League.
