= MKE Kırıkkalespor =

Turkish sports club

- Full name: Makine Kimya Endüstrisi (MKE) Kırıkkalespor Kulübü
- Founded: 1967
- Ground: Fikret Karabudak Stadium, Kırıkkale, Turkey
- Capacity: 5,402
- Chairman: Mustafa Demirel
- Manager: Erkan Kaya
- League: Kırıkkale 1st Amateur League
- 2024-25: 3rd
Home colours	Away colours	Third colours

MKE Kırıkkalespor is a sports club located in Kırıkkale, Turkey. The football club plays in the Kırıkkale 1st Amateur League.

== League participations ==
- Turkish Super League: 1978–79
- TFF First League: 1974–78, 1979–88, 1999–01
- TFF Second League: 1967–74, 1988–99, 2001–09
- TFF Third League: 2009–12
- Regional Amateur League: 2012–15, 2016–18
- Kırıkkale 1st Amateur League: 2015–16, 2018-
