= Bozüyükspor =

Turkish sports club

- Full name: Bozüyükspor Kulübü
- Founded: 1973
- Dissolved: 2016

Bozüyükspor was a Turkish sports club founded in 1973. Their colors were navy blue and white. They played their home matches in Bozüyük Şehir Stadı in Bozüyük, Bilecik Province. The club was a brother team of Eskişehirspor because Bozüyük is just 40 km away from Eskişehir and is bounded economically to them. Their highest achievement so far is that they played in the old Second League in the 1991–92 season.

== League participations ==
- TFF First League: 1991–92
- TFF Second League: 1984–91, 1992–98, 2007–
- TFF Third League: 2006–07
- Turkish Regional Amateur League: 1973–84, 1998–06
