= Ispartaspor =

Turkish football club

- Full name: Ispartaspor
- Founded: 1967
- Dissolved: 2014
- Ground: Isparta Atatürk Şehir Stadyumu, Isparta
- Capacity: 10,500
- League: Turkish Regional Amateur League 7th Group
Home colours	Away colours

Ispartaspor was a Turkish football (soccer) team from the city of Isparta in Isparta Province. Pink and green were the club's colours.
