= Yalovaspor =

Turkish football club

- Full name: Yalova Spor Kulübü
- Nickname: Yalvaçlar
- Founded: 1963
- Ground: Atatürk Stadium, Yalova
- Capacity: 8,980
- Chairman: Ali Yavru
- Manager: Aytaç Yaka
- League: Turkish Regional Amateur League
Home colours	Away colours

Yalovaspor is an association football club located in the northwestern town of Yalova, Turkey, playing in the Turkish Regional Amateur League.

== History ==
The club was relegated to the Third League after losing to Fatih Karagümrük 4–1 in an away match in Round 29 of the 2010–11 season.

== League participations ==
- Süper Lig : 1968–69
- TFF First League: 1966–68, 1990–94
- TFF Second League: 1964–66, 1985–90, 1994–2001^{a}, 2003–07, 2008–09
- TFF Third League: 2001–03, 2007–08, 2009–11, 2020–21
- BAL: 2011–12, 2013–14, 2015–20, 2021–23, 2024–
- Amatör Futbol Ligleri: 1963–64, 1969–84, 2012–13, 2014–15, 2023–24

^{a} Didn't play in the 1999–2000 season due to Marmara earthquake.

== Current squad ==
Note: Flags indicate national team as defined under FIFA eligibility rules; some limited exceptions apply. Players may hold more than one non-FIFA nationality.

No.	Pos.	Nation	Player
—	GK	SWE	Ridvan Tezcan
—	GK	TUR	Kadir Bostan
—	GK	TUR	Nazmi Görkem Bakkal
—	DF	TUR	Temel Taşcı
—	DF	TUR	Mertcan Şenyer
—	DF	TUR	Nazım Berat Karaali
—	DF	TUR	Esat Özdemir
—	DF	TUR	Veli Cebe
—	DF	TUR	Soner Bal
—	DF	TUR	Yiğit Aslan
—	DF	TUR	Muhammet Kalender
—	DF	TUR	Burkay İsen
—	MF	TUR	Sezer Doğan
—	MF	TUR	Furkan Özdemir

No.	Pos.	Nation	Player
—	MF	TUR	Fırat Can Kılıç
—	MF	TUR	Hüseyin Emre Kalfa
—	MF	TUR	Can Othan
—	MF	TUR	Mehmet Albayrak
—	MF	TUR	Oğuz Çimen
—	MF	TUR	Okan Gümüş
—	MF	TUR	Oğuz Kaan Güneş
—	FW	TUR	Batuhan Kaya
—	FW	TUR	Yiğithan Yiğit
—	FW	TUR	Ömer Kaya
—	FW	TUR	İbrahim Çağırtekin
—	FW	TUR	Ömercan Kartal
—	FW	NGR	Olaseni Samson Obagbemiro

Source: Maçkolik
