= Çubukspor =

Turkish football club

- Full name: Çubukspor Futbol AŞ
- Founded: 1977
- Ground: Çubuk İlçe Stadium, Çubuk, Ankara
- Capacity: 2,500
- Chairman: Emre Aslantaş
- Manager: Şevki Koç
- League: Turkish Regional Amateur League
Home colours	Away colours

Çubukspor Futbol AŞ (formerly Gölbaşıspor) is a football club located in Çubuk in Ankara. Not be confused with Çubuk 1959 Spor Kulübü (Çubukspor 1959).

== History ==
Blue-yellow Çubukspor Futbol AŞ is a team of the Ankara Province. While the team, which was founded as Pursaklarspor, played in the amateur leagues, in 2007, Altındağ Municipality took over the competitor rights of Kızılcahamam Belediyespor. In the same season the club managed to get promoted in their first season in the TFF Third League winning the promotion play-offs of the 2008-2009 season. On July 4, 2011, Pursaklarspor changed its name to Kızılcahamamspor A.Ş.. During this period, the matches were played in Kızılcahamam district. Before the 2014-2015 season, Kızılcahamamspor changed its name to Gölbaşıspor.

At the beginning of the 2016-2017 season, due to the fact that the well-established club Çubukspor (later renamed to Çubukspor 1959) could not participate in the leagues that season, Gölbaşıspor changed its name for the 3rd time and took the name Çubukspor Futbol A.Ş. and moved to the Çubuk district.
