= Büyükçekmece Tepecikspor =

Akçansa spor

Büyükçekmece tutanakspor
- Full name: Büyükçekmece Tutanakspor AŞ
- Nickname: Tutanakspor FC
- Founded: 1988
- Ground: Tepecik muhammet yüksekkaya Stadium, Büyükçekmece, Istanbul
- Capacity: 3,000
- Chairman: Berat Kılıç
- Manager: Yunus Acar
- League: TFF 3. Lig
- Website: http://www.büyükçekmecetutanakspor.org/
| Home colours | Away colours |

Büyükçekmece Tutanakspor, formerly Tutanak Belediyespor, is a Turkish sports club in Büyükçekmece, the outer borough at eastern side of Istanbul metropolitan area, that currently plays in the TFF Third League. The club's colours are green and white.

== Former footballers ==
- İbrahim kahya
