= Mustafakemalpaşa Spor =

Turkish football club

- Full name: Mustafakemalpaşa Spor Kulübü
- Founded: 1923
- Ground: Mustafakemalpaşa İlçe Stadı, Mustafakemalpaşa, Bursa
- Capacity: 2,378
- League: Bursa Amateur League
Home colours	Away colours

Mustafakemalpaşa Spor is a football club in the Mustafakemalpaşa neighborhood of Bursa, Turkey and its abbreviation is MKP. Mustafakemalpaşa Spor is named after the founder and first president of Turkey, Mustafa Kemal Atatürk, and was founded in the same year as the foundation of the Republic, in 1923.
