= 2012–13 Turkish Cup =

2012–13 Türkiye Kupası
Ziraat Türkiye Kupası

Tournament details
- Country: Turkey
- Dates: 19 September 2012– 22 May 2013
- Teams: 156

Final positions
- Champions: Fenerbahçe
- Runners-up: Trabzonspor
- UEFA Europa League: Trabzonspor

Tournament statistics
- Matches played: 176
- Goals scored: 568 (3.23 per match)
- Top goal scorer(s): (Sweden) Erkan Zengin (9 goals)

The 2012–13 Turkish Cup (Turkish: Türkiye Kupası) was the 51st season of the Turkish Cup. Ziraat Bankası is the sponsor of the tournament, thus the sponsored name is Ziraat Turkish Cup. The winners earned a berth in the play-off round of the 2013–14 UEFA Europa League. Fenerbahçe are the defending champions. The winners also qualified for the 2013 Turkish Super Cup.

In a bet to widen the audience and turn the cup into a true national cup, a format change has been made for this season. The number of participating teams increased from 57 to 156, allowing teams from Turkish Regional Amateur League to have a shot at the cup. The knockout qualifying format of the 2011–2012 season have been revised. The group stage matches that were contested between 2005 and 2011 returned as a round-robin tournament.

== Round and draw dates ==
Round	Draw date	Match date(s)	New entries	Fixtures	Clubs	Entering leagues
First round	14 September 2012	19–20 September 2012	86	43	156 → 113	TFF Third League & Turkish Regional Amateur League
Second round	21 September 2012	25 September–11 October 2012	65	54	113 → 59	Süper Lig & TFF First League & TFF Second League
Third round	18 October 2012	30 October–8 November 2012	–	27	59 → 32	–
Fourth round	16 November 2012	27 November–5 December 2012	5	16	32 → 16	Süper Lig
Fifth round	6 December 2012	11–13 December 2012	–	8	16 → 8	–
Group stage	14 December 2012	19 December 2012–28 February 2013	–	24	8 → 4	–
Semi-finals	14 December 2012	17 April–8 May 2013	–	4	4 → 2	–
Final	14 December 2012	22 May 2013	–	1	2 → 1	–

== First round ==
In the first round, 32 teams from the Turkish Regional Amateur League and 54 teams from the TFF Third League played in a one-legged knockout tournament. The 43 winners advanced to the second round. The draw for the first round took place on 14 September 2012 at 14:30 (EEST). A Haber broadcast the draw live on television.

Team 1	Score	Team 2
İstanbulspor	1–0	Fatih Karagümrük
Dersimspor	0–2	Anadolu Üsküdar
Çerkezköyspor	0–1	Sancaktepe Belediyespor
Darıca Gençlerbirliği	3–0	Derince Belediyespor
Kocaelispor	1–0	Beyköy Belediyespor
Gebzespor	2–3	Gölcükspor
Altınova Belediyespor	0–2	Dardanelspor
Kütahyaspor	1–0	Bursa Nilüferspor
Oyak Renault	0–1	Orhangazispor
Altınordu	0–1	Menemen Belediyespor
Aydınspor 1923	2–0	Bergama Belediyespor
Bucak Belediye	1–2	Tekirova Belediyespor
Manavgat Evrensekispor	0–1	Muğlaspor
Sandıklıspor	0–1	Emrespor
Uşak Belediyespor	8–0	Afyonkarahisarspor
Hacettepe	1–2 (a.e.t.)	Keçiörengücü
Çorum Belediyespor	4–1	Yeni Amasyaspor
Kastamonuspor	4–1	Ayancıkspor
Kilimli Belediyespor	3–0	Bartınspor
Kırşehir Köy Hizmetlerispor	0–3	Yozgatspor
Şekerspor	4–1	Kırıkkalespor
Karaman Belediyespor	5–1	Nevşehirspor Gençlik
Niğde Belediyespor	1–0	68 Yeni Aksarayspor
Arhavispor	0–1	Trabzon Kanuni
Arsinspor	2–1	Pazarspor
Erzincanspor	0–0 (3–4 p)	Dersimspor
İskenderunspor 1967	4–0	Adıyamanspor
Kahramanmaraş Belediyespor	1–2	Kırıkhanspor
Kadirlispor	6–1	Kilis Belediyespor
Ardahanspor	1–4	Patnos Gençlikspor
Karsspor	0–2	Iğdır Üniversitesi
Diyarbakır B.B.	4–0	Elazığ Belediyespor
Bingölspor	3–1	Diyarbakırspor
Belediye Vanspor	2–0	Tatvan Gençlerbirliği
Siirtspor	3–0	Muş Ovasıspor
Cizre Basraspor	3–0	Mardinspor
Batman Petrolspor	7–0	Hakkari Zapspor
Erzurum B.B.	3–1	Beşikdüzüspor
Gümüşhanespor	5–4	Bayburt Özel İdare
Beylerbeyispor	4–2 (a.e.t.)	Edirnespor Gençlik
Maltepespor	1–2	Silivrispor
Çorumspor	2–4	Ankara Demirspor
Erzincan Refahiyespor	0–1	Eylül Belediyespor

== Second round ==
The most fixtures were played in the second round. 13 teams from the Süper Lig, 18 teams from the TFF Second League, 12 teams from the TFF Third League played matches against 43 winners from the first round. Also 22 teams from TFF Second League played against each other. 54 winners in this round advanced to the third round.

Team 1	Score	Team 2
Niğde Belediyespor	1–2	Beşiktaş
Dersimspor	0–7	Gençlerbirliği
Orhangazispor	2–1 (a.e.t.)	İstanbul B.B.
İstanbulspor	1–3	Kasımpaşa
Ankaragücü	5–1	Iğdır Üniversitesi
Ümraniyespor	1–2	Kayseri Erciyesspor
Çorum Belediyespor	2–1 (a.e.t.)	Adana Demirspor
Samsunspor	0–2	Eylül Belediyespor
Patnos Gençlikspor	1–2	Kartalspor
Konyaspor	2–0	Kırıkhanspor
Akhisar Belediyespor	5–2	Aydınspor 1923
Karabükspor	3–2	Gümüşhanespor
Antalyaspor	5–3	Menemen Belediyespor
Gaziantepspor	1–0	Emrespor
Ankara Demirspor	0–1	Elazığspor
Denizlispor	1–2	Dardanelspor
Bandırmaspor	1–0	Kilimli Belediyespor
Balıkesirspor	4–0	İskenderunspor 1967
Muğlaspor	2–3	Tavşanlı Linyitspor
Fethiyespor	5–0	Cizre Basraspor
Turgutluspor	1–0	Bingölspor
Arsinspor	4–2	Bucaspor
Boluspor	1–2	Yozgatspor
Manisaspor	3–1 (a.e.t.)	Şekerspor
Karaman Belediyespor	1–2	Bozüyükspor
Gaziantep B.B.	2–0	Keçiörengücü
Darıca Gençlerbirliği	2–1	Kırklarelispor
Batman Petrolspor	2–1	Körfez
Kızılcahamamspor	1–0	Kütahyaspor
Tepecikspor	3–0	Beylerbeyispor
Bugsaşspor	2–1	Silivrispor
Uşak Belediyespor	1–10	Denizli Belediyespor
Kahramanmaraşspor	1–2	Sakaryaspor
Alanyaspor	0–3	Yeni Malatyaspor
Tokatspor	3–2	Hatayspor
Anadolu Selçukluspor	1–2	Pendikspor
Çelikspor	2–3	Ofspor
Eyüpspor	3–2 (a.e.t.)	Ünyespor
İnegölspor	0–2	Giresunspor
Tarsus Idman Yurdu	0–2	Sarıyer
Şekerspor	1–2	Güngörenspor
Gaziosmanpaşaspor	0–1 (a.e.t.)	Bayrampaşaspor
Çankırıspor	1–2	Nazilli Belediyespor
Trabzon Kanuni	0–3	Sivasspor
Göztepe	3–0	Gölcükspor
Adanaspor	2–1	Erzurum B.B.
Mersin İdman Yurdu	3–0	Siirtspor
Kastamonuspor	2–3	Orduspor
Diyarbakır B.B.	1–0	Çaykur Rizespor
Kocaelispor	1–0	Karşıyaka
Sancaktepe Belediyespor	3–1	Kayserispor
Tekirova Belediyespor	2–4	Altay
1461 Trabzon	4–1	Belediye Vanspor
Kadirlispor	0–4 (a.e.t.)	Şanlıurfaspor

== Third round ==
54 winners of the second round played against each other. 27 winners advanced to the fourth round.

Team 1	Score	Team 2
Tepecikspor	1–3	Gençlerbirliği
Konyaspor	0–3	Nazilli Belediyespor
Güngörenspor	0–2	Sivasspor
Şanlıurfaspor	1–1 (4–2 p)	Orhangazispor
Batman Petrolspor	1–2	Adanaspor
Bandırmaspor	4–1	Yozgatspor
Dardanelspor	1–1 (6–7 p)	Manisaspor
Kızılcahamamspor	2–3 (a.e.t.)	1461 Trabzon
Diyarbakır B.B.	0–1	Bugsaşspor
Tokatspor	1–0	Akhisar Belediyespor
Ankaragücü	2–0 (a.e.t.)	Çorum Belediyespor
Giresunspor	0–3	Mersin İdman Yurdu
Karabükspor	1–0	Yeni Malatyaspor
Göztepe	2–1	Sakaryaspor
Beşiktaş	2–1	Ofspor
Denizli Belediyespor	0–3	Bozüyükspor
Balıkesirspor	2–1	Turgutluspor
Altay	1–0	Fethiyespor
Tavşanlı Linyitspor	1–0	Eylül Belediyespor
Gaziantep B.B.	3–3 (8–7 p)	Darıca Gençlerbirliği
Kasımpaşa	5–0	Kocaelispor
Orduspor	3–0	Sancaktepe
Antalyaspor	7–0	Eyüpspor
Arsinspor	0–1	Gaziantepspor
Kayseri Erciyesspor	4–1	Sarıyer
Bayrampaşaspor	1–0	Kartalspor
Pendikspor	3–2	Elazığspor

== Fourth round ==
5 teams from Süper Lig, that are playing in European competitions (namely, Galatasaray, Fenerbahçe, Trabzonspor, Bursaspor and Eskişehirspor) joined the 27 winners from third round. 32 teams competed for the fifth round and a seeding procedure was underway. Matches were played in first team's home ground. 16 teams advanced to the fifth round.

Team 1	Score	Team 2
Tokatspor	0–1	Mersin İdman Yurdu
Altay	1–0 (a.e.t.)	Kayseri Erciyesspor
Galatasaray	4–1	Balıkesirspor
Tavşanlı Linyitspor	0–5	Antalyaspor
Göztepe	1–0	Orduspor
Adanaspor	1–1 (1–3 p)	1461 Trabzon
Beşiktaş	3–2	Ankaragücü
Fenerbahçe	1–0	Pendikspor
Bugsaşspor	0–4	Eskişehirspor
Gençlerbirliği	5–1	Bandırmaspor
Sivasspor	3–0	Manisaspor
Trabzonspor	4–0	Şanlıurfaspor
Bozüyükspor	1–2	Gaziantepspor
Nazilli Belediyespor	0–3	Bursaspor
Kasımpaşa	3–1	Bayrampaşaspor
Gaziantep B.B.	1–2 (a.e.t.)	Karabükspor

== Fifth round ==
The draw for the fifth round was on 6 December 2012. 16 winners of the fourth round played against each other for the last 8 spots for the group stage. The matches took place on 11–13 December 2012.

Team 1	Score	Team 2
Altay	0–2	Bursaspor
Gaziantepspor	0–1 (a.e.t.)	Sivasspor
Eskişehirspor	5–1	Karabükspor
Galatasaray	1–2	1461 Trabzon
Gençlerbirliği	2–3	Mersin İdman Yurdu
Antalyaspor	2–1	Beşiktaş
Fenerbahçe	4–0	Göztepe
Kasımpaşa	1–1 (2–4 p)	Trabzonspor

== Group stage ==
8 winners from the fifth and the last qualifying round were split into two groups of 4 teams. This stage was a round-robin tournament with home and away matches, in the vein of UEFA European competitions' group stages. The winners and runners-up of the two groups advanced to the semi-finals.

=== Group A ===
Pos	Team	Pld	W	D	L	GF	GA	GD	Pts	FEN	SİV	1461	BUR
1	Fenerbahçe	6	4	1	1	12	5	+7	13		2–0	2–3	3–0
2	Sivasspor	6	3	2	1	6	5	+1	11	0–0		2–1	2–1
3	1461 Trabzon	6	1	2	3	5	9	−4	5	0–2	1–1		0–0
4	Bursaspor	6	1	1	4	5	9	−4	4	2–3	0–1	2–0	

Legend: Blue = home team win; Yellow = draw; Red = away team win.

=== Group B ===
Pos	Team	Pld	W	D	L	GF	GA	GD	Pts	TRA	ESK	ANT	MİY
1	Trabzonspor	6	5	0	1	11	3	+8	15		2–0	1–0	3–0
2	Eskişehirspor	6	4	0	2	9	5	+4	12	1–0		2–1	3–1
3	Antalyaspor	6	3	0	3	13	8	+5	9	2–3	1–0		4–2
4	Mersin İdman Yurdu	6	0	0	6	3	20	−17	0	0–2	0–3	0–5	

Legend: Blue = home team win; Yellow = draw; Red = away team win.

== Bracket ==
Semifinals
1	Eskişehirspor	1	1	2(1)
4	Fenerbahçe (p)	1	1	2(4)
3	Sivasspor	2	0	2
2	Trabzonspor	1	6	7

Finals
Fenerbahçe	1
Trabzonspor	0

== Semi-finals ==
Winner of the first group was drawn against runners-up of the second group. Also the winners of the second group played against runners-up of the first group. The matches were contested as two-legged ties with home and away matches. The runners-up played the first match in their home ground. The winners of the two legs played in the final.

=== First leg ===
17 April 2013 Semi-final	Sivasspor	2−1	Trabzonspor	Sivas, Turkey
19:00 EEST (UTC+03)	Chahechouhe 44'; E. Kılıç 76'	Report (in Turkish)	Sapara 90'	Stadium: Sivas 4 Eylül Stadium; Attendance: 5,500; Referee: Hüseyin Göçek

17 April 2013 Semi-final	Eskişehirspor	1−1	Fenerbahçe	Eskişehir, Turkey
21:15 EEST (UTC+03)	E. Zengin 13'	Report (in Turkish)	M. Topal 20'	Stadium: Eskişehir Atatürk Stadium; Attendance: 12,400; Referee: Yunus Yıldırım

=== Second leg ===
8 May 2013 Semi-final	Trabzonspor	6−0	Sivasspor	Trabzon, Turkey
19:00 EEST (UTC+03)	Mierzejewski 38', 47', 53'; O. Adın 65'; V. Şen 72'; A. Akgün 77'	Report (in Turkish)		Stadium: Hüseyin Avni Aker Stadium; Attendance: 15,300; Referee: Tolga Özkalfa

8 May 2013 Semi-final	Fenerbahçe	1−1 (a.e.t.) (4−1 p)	Eskişehirspor	Istanbul, Turkey
21:30 EEST (UTC+03)	Webo 32'	Report (in Turkish)	Tello 17'	Stadium: Şükrü Saracoğlu Stadium; Attendance: 22,500; Referee: Hüseyin Göçek
	Penalties
	Baroni (penalty scored); Kuyt (penalty scored); Webo (penalty scored); M. Topuz (penalty scored)		(penalty scored) D. Angelo; (penalty missed) N. Ateş; (penalty missed) Čaušić

== Final ==
The final was contested in a neutral ground as a one-off match. The winners were awarded 50 medals per club along with the Turkish Cup trophy.

22 May 2013 Final	Fenerbahçe	1–0	Trabzonspor	Ankara, Turkey
20:45 EEST (UTC+03)	Sow 9'	Report (in Turkish)		Stadium: Ankara 19 Mayıs Stadium; Attendance: 18,250; Referee: Fırat Aydınus; Man of the Match: Moussa Sow

== See also ==
- 2012–13 Süper Lig
- 2013 Turkish Cup Final
- 2013 Turkish Super Cup
- 2013–14 UEFA Europa League
