= 2012–13 TFF Third League =

TFF Third League
- Season: 2012–13
- Champions: 1: Diyarbakır BBSK; 2: Aydınspor 1923; 3: Altınordu
- Promoted: 1: Pazarspor; 2: Dardanelspor; 3: Gümüşhanespor
- Relegated: 1: Kastamonuspor, Beşikdüzüspor, Çorumspor; 2: Kilimli Belediyespor, İskenderunspor 1967, Gebzespor; 3: Isparta Emrespor, Diyarbakırspor, Mardinspor
- Top goalscorer: 1: Timur Kosovalı (Kayseri Şekerspor) 19; 2: Özer Kutlu (Ümraniyespor) 22; 3: Doğan Karakuş (Kocaelispor) 22
- Biggest home win: TBD
- Biggest away win: TBD
- Highest scoring: TBD

The 2012–13 TFF Third League (also known as Spor-Toto Third League due to sponsorship reasons) is the 12th season of the league since its establishment in 2001 as the fourth level division; and the 42nd season of the third league in Turkish football since its establishment in 1967–68 (before 2001 league was played as third level division). The start date of the league is 8 September 2012 and end date is 19 May 2013.

League was started with 54 teams in three groups: Groups 1, 2 and 3, each consisting of 18 teams. Winner of each group promoted to 2013–14 TFF Second League. A playoff series was played among the best four teams in each group to determine the three more teams to promote. Bottom three teams in each groups relegated to 2013–14 Turkish Regional Amateur League.

== TFF Third League 2012-13 clubs ==
Locations of teams in the 2011–12 TFF Third League.
Key: Black – Group 1, White – Group 2, Red – Group 3
- Group 1: Anadolu Üsküdar 1908, Ankara Demirspor, Belediye Vanspor, Bergama Belediyespor, Beşikdüzüspor, Çorumspor, Diyarbakır BB, Fatih Karagümrük, Gölcükspor, İstanbulspor, Kastamonuspor, Kayseri Şekerspor, Kırıkhanspor, Orhangazispor, Pazarspor, Sandıklıspor, Siirtspor, Tekirova Belediyespor.
- Group 2: Adıyamanspor, Aydınspor 1923, Batman Petrolspor, Belediye Bingölspor, Bursa Nilüferspor, Çanakkale Dardanelspor, Derince Belediyespor, Sivas Dört Eylül Belediyespor, Gebzespor, Hacettepe, İskenderunspor 1967, Kilimli Belediyespor, Manavgat Evrensekispor, Menemen Belediyespor, Refahiyespor, Silivrispor, Trabzon Kanuni FK, Ümraniyespor.
- Group 3: Altınordu, Arsinspor, Beylerbeyi, Çorum Belediyespor, Darıca Gençlerbirliği, Diyarbakırspor, Elazığ Belediyespor, Emrespor, Erzurum BB, Gümüşhanespor, Kahramanmaraş Belediyespor, Keçiörengücü, Kocaelispor, Maltepe, Mardinspor, Oyak Renaultspor, Sancaktepe Belediyespor, Yimpaş Yozgatspor.

== Group 1 ==
Pos	Team	Pld	W	D	L	GF	GA	GD	Pts	Qualification or relegation
1	Diyarbakır BB (C, P)	34	20	9	5	62	23	+39	69	Promotion to TFF Second League
2	Fatih Karagümrük	34	19	6	9	59	35	+24	63	Qualification for promotion playoffs
3	İstanbulspor	34	17	7	10	49	32	+17	58	Qualification for promotion playoffs
4	Tekirova Belediyespor	34	16	9	9	62	46	+16	57	Qualification for promotion playoffs
5	Pazarspor (P)	34	15	12	7	52	35	+17	57	Qualification for promotion playoffs
6	Kırıkhanspor	34	15	8	11	46	36	+10	53	
7	Orhangazispor	34	14	11	9	36	28	+8	53	
8	Kayseri Şekerspor	34	13	8	13	48	44	+4	47	
9	Ankara Demirspor	34	11	13	10	40	36	+4	46	
10	Anadolu Üsküdar 1908	34	12	9	13	40	39	+1	45	
11	Gölcükspor	34	12	8	14	44	48	−4	44	
12	Belediye Vanspor	34	10	10	14	28	39	−11	40	
13	Siirtspor	34	11	6	17	39	58	−19	39	
14	Sandıklıspor	34	10	9	15	45	56	−11	39	
15	Bergama Belediyespor	34	9	12	13	35	50	−15	39	
16	Kastamonuspor (R)	34	10	8	16	53	55	−2	38	Relegation to Turkish Regional Amateur League
17	Beşikdüzüspor (R)	34	8	14	12	31	33	−2	38	Relegation to Turkish Regional Amateur League
18	Çorumspor (R)	34	3	3	28	29	106	−77	12	Relegation to Turkish Regional Amateur League

Source: TFF
Rules for classification: 1) points; 2) goal difference; 3) number of goals scored.
(C) Champions; (P) Promoted; (R) Relegated

== Results ==
Home \ Away	ADÜ	AND	BLV	BER	BDS	ÇOR	DBB	FKG	GCK	İST	KST	KŞE	KHS	ORH	PAZ	SND	SRT	TEB
Anadolu Üsküdar 1908	—	0–0	1–2	1–1	0–1	6–0	1–1	0–2	1–0	0–2	0–4	2–0	1–1	1–2	2–1	1–0	1–1	2–0
Ankara Demirspor	1–1	—	1–0	3–1	1–1	2–2	0–1	1–2	3–0	0–1	0–0	1–1	1–0	1–0	1–1	4–1	0–0	2–2
Belediye Vanspor	1–0	0–1	—	1–0	1–0	2–1	1–1	2–2	0–3	0–2	3–1	1–1	1–3	1–2	1–1	2–1	3–0	0–2
Bergama Belediyespor	0–2	0–0	1–1	—	0–0	3–2	0–1	1–4	2–0	1–1	1–1	1–0	0–1	1–1	1–1	0–0	3–4	0–1
Beşikdüzüspor	0–0	1–1	0–0	1–1	—	1–1	0–1	0–1	2–2	0–1	1–2	3–0	1–1	1–2	0–0	0–0	2–0	2–1
Çorumspor	2–1	1–4	0–0	0–1	1–3	—	1–4	0–3	1–2	2–1	1–4	3–2	0–1	1–2	1–2	0–1	1–4	1–3
Diyarbakır BB	3–1	1–1	1–0	0–1	3–0	6–0	—	2–3	2–1	1–1	0–0	2–0	2–0	1–1	2–2	3–0	4–1	3–2
Fatih Karagümrük	0–0	4–0	0–0	1–2	0–2	5–0	1–0	—	4–0	3–2	2–1	1–0	1–0	0–1	1–2	1–1	2–0	3–3
Gölcükspor	1–2	1–0	4–1	3–2	1–1	5–1	0–1	3–1	—	1–1	1–1	1–2	1–0	0–2	0–0	1–1	1–0	2–2
İstanbulspor	0–1	2–0	1–2	3–0	3–0	1–0	2–1	0–2	0–1	—	3–2	0–1	2–1	1–3	0–0	2–3	0–0	2–1
Kastamonuspor	1–2	2–1	0–2	1–1	0–1	5–0	0–2	0–3	1–2	0–1	—	1–0	2–4	0–1	2–1	5–1	1–1	3–2
Kayseri Şekerspor	1–5	1–1	3–0	7–2	3–2	7–0	1–2	0–1	2–1	0–1	1–0	—	3–1	2–0	2–1	0–4	1–0	1–3
Kırıkhanspor	1–3	1–2	1–0	1–2	0–0	4–0	1–0	2–1	3–0	0–4	3–0	0–0	—	1–1	2–2	2–1	4–0	2–1
Orhangazispor	1–1	1–2	0–0	1–1	0–0	2–0	0–1	2–0	0–0	1–1	2–0	1–1	0–1	—	1–1	1–0	0–1	0–1
Pazarspor	2–0	2–0	2–0	3–0	1–3	4–0	2–2	1–0	3–2	1–0	3–3	0–0	1–0	4–1	—	2–1	4–3	1–2
Sandıklıspor	2–0	1–1	0–0	1–2	1–0	6–3	0–6	5–2	1–3	2–3	2–2	1–1	2–3	0–1	1–0	—	1–0	2–1
Siirtspor	2–1	1–3	2–0	2–1	2–1	3–1	0–2	1–2	2–1	0–3	2–5	0–2	0–0	0–3	0–1	2–2	—	0–0
Tekirova Belediyespor	3–0	2–1	1–0	1–2	2–1	6–2	0–0	1–1	3–1	2–2	5–3	2–2	1–1	2–0	1–0	2–0	2–4	—

Source: TFF
Legend: Blue = home team win; Yellow = draw; Red = away team win.

== Promotion Playoffs ==
=== Semifinals ===
Team 1	Score	Team 2
İstanbulspor	1–4	Tekirova Belediyespor
Pazarspor	1–1 (4–3 pen.)	Fatih Karagümrük

=== Finals ===
Team 1	Score	Team 2
Tekirova Belediyespor	2–2 (4–5 pen.)	Pazarspor

== Group 2 ==
Pos	Team	Pld	W	D	L	GF	GA	GD	Pts	Qualification or relegation
1	Aydınspor 1923 (C, P)	34	20	8	6	62	24	+38	68	Promotion to TFF Second League
2	Çanakkale Dardanelspor (P)	34	18	9	7	63	31	+32	63	Qualification for promotion playoffs
3	Sivas Dört Eylül Bld.	34	16	11	7	47	33	+14	59	Qualification for promotion playoffs
4	Batman Petrolspor	34	18	5	11	49	37	+12	59	Qualification for promotion playoffs
5	Ümraniyespor	34	16	10	8	53	33	+20	58	Qualification for promotion playoffs
6	Belediye Bingölspor	34	14	11	9	44	38	+6	53	
7	Hacettepe	34	13	13	8	51	41	+10	52	
8	Menemen Belediyespor	34	12	12	10	47	43	+4	48	
9	Manavgat Evrensekispor	34	10	13	11	53	53	0	43	
10	Erzincan Refahiyespor	34	10	12	12	36	36	0	42	
11	Adıyamanspor	34	11	9	14	44	46	−2	42	
12	Derince Belediyespor	34	10	11	13	37	47	−10	41	
13	Silivrispor	34	11	8	15	27	43	−16	41	
14	Bursa Nilüferspor	34	10	10	14	45	51	−6	40	
15	Trabzon Kanuni FK	34	11	7	16	31	47	−16	40	
16	Kilimli Belediyespor (R)	34	8	15	11	39	47	−8	39	Relegation to Turkish Regional Amateur League
17	İskenderunspor 1967 (R)	34	7	6	21	37	72	−35	27	Relegation to Turkish Regional Amateur League
18	Gebzespor (R)	34	4	4	26	39	82	−43	13	Relegation to Turkish Regional Amateur League

Source: TFF
Rules for classification: 1) points; 2) goal difference; 3) number of goals scored.
(C) Champions; (P) Promoted; (R) Relegated

== Results ==
Home \ Away	ADI	AYD	BPS	BİN	BNS	ÇDA	DER	REF	GEB	HAC	İSK	KİL	MEV	MBS	SİL	SBS	TKA	ÜMR
Adıyamanspor	—	1–1	2–0	2–0	1–3	0–2	3–0	1–3	0–0	2–2	3–1	0–0	1–2	1–1	0–2	0–0	0–0	3–1
Aydınspor 1923	3–1	—	2–1	2–0	2–1	2–0	3–0	2–1	5–0	2–2	4–0	1–1	4–0	1–0	4–0	0–1	0–1	1–0
Batman Petrolspor	2–0	1–1	—	2–1	3–2	2–1	4–1	2–0	1–6	2–0	2–0	4–1	2–1	1–0	1–0	2–1	3–1	1–1
Belediye Bingölspor	1–0	2–2	0–2	—	2–1	0–4	1–0	1–0	3–0	2–1	2–3	2–2	3–1	0–0	1–1	0–0	3–0	1–0
Bursa Nilüferspor	1–3	0–3	1–5	2–0	—	0–1	4–2	1–0	1–0	1–1	1–1	3–0	1–2	1–0	1–1	1–2	0–0	4–1
Çanakkale Dardanelspor	1–1	0–1	2–1	1–1	2–2	—	1–1	3–0	2–0	3–3	4–1	1–1	0–0	0–1	3–0	1–3	4–1	0–0
Derince Belediyespor	2–3	0–0	1–0	3–2	2–1	1–3	—	1–1	3–1	0–0	1–1	3–1	0–0	0–1	0–0	2–1	4–0	1–4
Erzincan Refahiyespor	1–1	0–1	0–0	0–0	3–0	0–4	1–1	—	1–0	2–1	2–0	4–0	1–1	2–0	0–1	1–1	1–2	2–2
Gebzespor	0–3	0–3	0–3	1–2	1–4	1–3	0–1	2–1	—	3–4	1–0	0–0	1–2	4–5	0–1	1–2	1–2	2–2
Hacettepe	1–0	2–1	2–0	1–0	2–2	1–2	0–0	3–1	1–1	—	2–0	1–1	2–1	0–0	2–0	1–1	2–0	0–1
İskenderunspor 1967	3–2	1–2	3–0	1–1	1–1	1–5	1–2	0–1	2–7	2–4	—	1–3	1–1	1–3	2–0	0–1	2–1	1–0
Kilimli Belediyespor	1–2	1–1	0–1	1–1	1–1	1–0	3–1	1–1	4–2	1–1	2–1	—	0–0	0–0	4–2	1–1	1–1	2–1
Manavgat Evrensekispor	2–3	1–0	1–1	0–1	3–3	3–3	0–2	1–1	5–0	2–3	7–1	3–2	—	0–0	3–1	2–1	3–1	2–2
Menemen Belediyespor	3–2	2–5	1–0	2–1	0–2	2–1	1–1	1–1	4–1	1–1	0–4	1–0	6–0	—	1–1	1–1	3–1	0–0
Silivrispor	0–1	1–1	2–0	0–2	1–0	0–1	0–0	0–3	2–1	0–2	1–0	0–1	2–1	3–2	—	3–2	1–0	0–0
Sivas Dört Eylül Bld.	3–0	1–0	2–0	3–3	0–0	0–2	2–1	0–0	3–0	2–1	3–0	2–0	1–1	2–1	3–1	—	0–0	0–2
Trabzon Kanuni FK	3–2	0–2	0–0	1–1	0–1	0–1	2–0	0–1	4–0	2–1	0–0	2–1	1–0	3–2	1–0	1–2	—	0–4
Ümraniyespor	1–0	2–0	1–0	1–2	3–0	0–2	2–0	2–0	3–2	3–1	3–1	2–1	2–2	2–2	0–0	4–0	1–0	—

Source: TFF
Legend: Blue = home team win; Yellow = draw; Red = away team win.

== Promotion Playoffs ==
=== Semifinals ===
Team 1	Score	Team 2
Sivas Dört Eylül Bld.	1–2	Çanakkale Dardanelspor
Ümraniyespor	2–1	Batman Petrolspor

=== Finals ===
Team 1	Score	Team 2
Çanakkale Dardanelspor	5–0	Ümraniyespor

== Group 3 ==
Pos	Team	Pld	W	D	L	GF	GA	GD	Pts	Qualification or relegation
1	Altınordu (C, P)	34	23	7	4	75	27	+48	76	Promotion to TFF Second League
2	Darıca Gençlerbirliği	34	21	7	6	66	33	+33	70	Qualification for promotion playoffs
3	Keçiörengücü	34	21	6	7	59	31	+28	69	Qualification for promotion playoffs
4	Kahramanmaraş BB	34	21	2	11	65	34	+31	65	Qualification for promotion playoffs
5	Gümüşhanespor (P)	34	17	13	4	58	25	+33	64	Qualification for promotion playoffs
6	Erzurum BB	34	18	10	6	53	25	+28	64	
7	Sancaktepe Belediyespor	34	16	12	6	55	26	+29	60	
8	Maltepespor	34	14	9	11	36	33	+3	51	
9	Oyak Renaultspor	34	12	8	14	40	29	+11	44	
10	Beylerbeyi	34	11	10	13	48	48	0	43	
11	Yimpaş Yozgatspor	34	11	8	15	52	57	−5	41	
12	Çorum Belediyespor	34	9	11	14	43	48	−5	38	
13	Arsinspor	34	9	10	15	41	44	−3	37	
14	Kocaelispor	34	11	7	16	44	60	−16	37	
15	Elazığ Belediyespor	34	7	12	15	26	35	−9	33	
16	Emrespor (R)	34	8	11	15	31	37	−6	32	Relegation to Turkish Regional Amateur League
17	Diyarbakırspor (R)	34	3	5	26	26	78	−52	8	Relegation to Turkish Regional Amateur League
18	Mardinspor (R)	34	0	0	34	2	150	−148	−3	Relegation to Turkish Regional Amateur League

Source: TFF
Rules for classification: 1) points; 2) goal difference; 3) number of goals scored.
(C) Champions; (P) Promoted; (R) Relegated

== Results ==
Home \ Away	ATO	ARS	BEY	ÇBS	DGB	DYB	ELB	EMR	BBE	GÜM	KBB	KÖG	KOC	MLT	MAR	ORS	SAN	YOZ
Altınordu	—	3–1	2–1	2–0	3–0	5–1	3–0	3–1	2–2	0–1	2–1	4–1	6–2	3–0	4–0	0–0	1–1	2–0
Arsinspor	3–1	—	0–0	1–1	0–3	1–1	1–0	1–0	2–0	1–1	0–1	1–2	5–2	0–0	7–1	0–0	0–1	1–0
Beylerbeyi	0–2	2–0	—	3–0	0–0	4–2	0–0	0–0	0–1	0–0	1–2	0–2	4–0	1–0	6–0	2–1	0–7	3–3
Çorum Belediyespor	1–2	2–2	3–2	—	2–1	4–1	0–0	2–0	0–3	1–1	3–2	1–1	1–3	0–0	5–0	0–0	1–1	0–1
Darıca Gençlerbirliği	1–2	2–0	4–0	1–0	—	5–0	2–1	1–0	2–1	3–2	1–1	2–1	2–0	2–2	6–0	1–1	1–1	3–1
Diyarbakırspor	1–2	0–0	0–5	1–1	0–2	—	0–1	0–1	0–1	2–3	0–1	0–1	2–2	0–1	3–0	0–1	0–0	4–2
Elazığ Belediyespor	0–0	1–0	2–2	1–4	0–2	3–0	—	3–3	0–2	0–0	1–0	0–1	2–1	0–1	2–0	0–0	1–1	1–1
Emrespor	0–1	1–3	1–1	2–2	1–2	1–0	1–0	—	1–1	0–1	1–1	0–0	0–0	2–0	3–0	1–1	0–1	1–1
Erzurum BB	1–1	2–0	2–1	2–0	2–0	5–0	2–0	1–0	—	1–1	1–2	1–0	1–0	1–1	4–1	2–0	2–1	1–1
Gümüşhanespor	2–0	3–2	1–1	1–0	1–1	5–1	1–1	2–0	0–0	—	1–0	1–1	0–2	1–1	9–0	2–1	1–0	1–0
Kahramanmaraş BB	0–2	3–1	5–0	1–0	3–4	2–0	1–0	2–1	2–1	3–1	—	2–3	1–3	1–0	12–0	2–1	1–0	1–3
Keçiörengücü	0–2	3–0	1–0	2–3	2–0	3–1	1–0	2–1	1–1	1–0	1–0	—	3–0	2–0	7–0	2–1	2–2	5–1
Kocaelispor	1–1	1–1	2–2	3–1	1–0	3–0	0–0	2–2	3–2	0–2	0–2	1–4	—	2–1	4–0	0–4	0–1	3–0
Maltepespor	3–3	1–0	1–2	3–0	0–2	3–0	0–0	1–0	0–0	1–1	1–0	1–2	1–0	—	3–0	2–0	2–0	1–3
Mardinspor	0–7	0–4	0–3	0–2	0–3	0–5	0–5	0–3	0–3	0–5	0–3	0–1	0–2	0–2	—	0–3	0–3	0–2
Oyak Renaultspor	0–2	2–1	2–0	1–0	1–2	3–0	1–0	0–1	1–0	1–2	0–1	3–0	4–0	0–1	4–0	—	0–1	0–0
Sancaktepe Belediyespor	1–0	0–0	1–2	2–2	2–2	3–1	1–0	2–1	0–0	0–0	0–3	1–0	3–0	4–0	8–0	2–1	—	2–0
Yimpaş Yozgatspor	1–2	4–2	1–0	2–1	2–3	3–0	3–1	0–1	1–4	0–4	1–2	1–1	2–1	1–2	7–0	2–2	2–2	—

Source: TFF
Legend: Blue = home team win; Yellow = draw; Red = away team win.

== Promotion Playoffs ==
=== Semifinals ===
Team 1	Score	Team 2
Keçiörengücü	0–2	Gümüşhanespor
Kahramanmaraş BB	1–1 (3–5 pen.)	Darıca Gençlerbirliği

=== Finals ===
Team 1	Score	Team 2
Gümüşhanespor	2–0	Darıca Gençlerbirliği

== See also ==
- 2012–13 Turkish Cup
- 2012–13 Süper Lig
- 2012–13 TFF First League
- 2012–13 TFF Second League
