= 2013–14 TFF Third League =

TFF Third League
- Season: 2013–14
- Champions: Ümraniyespor; Menemen Belediyespor; Keçiörengücü
- Promoted: TBD
- Relegated: TBD
- Top goalscorer: TBD
- Biggest home win: TBD
- Biggest away win: TBD
- Highest scoring: TBD

The 2013–14 TFF Third League (also known as Spor-Toto Third League due to sponsorship reasons) is the 13th season of the league since its establishment in 2001 as the fourth level division; and the 43rd season of the third league in Turkish football since its establishment in 1967–68 (before 2001 league was played as third level division). The start date of the league is 1 September 2013 and end date is 13 May 2014.

League was started with 54 teams in three groups: Groups 1, 2 and 3, each consisting of 18 teams. Winner of each group will promote to 2013–14 TFF Second League A playoff series will be played among the best four teams in each group to determine the three more teams to promote. Bottom three teams in each groups will relegate to 2012–13 Regional Amateur League.

== TFF Third League 2013-14 clubs ==
Four teams relegated from 2012–13 TFF Second League: Denizli Belediyespor, Çamlıdere Şekerspor, Ünyespor, Sakaryaspor. Eleven teams promoted from 2012–13 Turkish Regional Amateur League: Trabzon Düzyurtspor, Yeni Diyarbakırspor, 1930 Bafraspor, Payas Belediyespor 1975, 68 Yeni Aksarayspor, Adliyespor, Kızılcabölükspor, Balçova Belediyespor, Ayvalıkgücü Belediyespor, Çıksalınspor and Tuzlaspor.

Teams continuing from 2012–13 TFF Third League:

Locations of teams in the 2011–12 TFF Third League.
Key: Black – Group 1, White – Group 2, Red – Group 3
- Group 1: Anadolu Üsküdar 1908, Ankara Demirspor, Belediye Vanspor, Bergama Belediyespor, Beşikdüzüspor, Çorumspor, Fatih Karagümrük, Gölcükspor, İstanbulspor, Kastamonuspor, Kayseri Şekerspor, Kırıkhanspor, Orhangazispor, Sandıklıspor, Siirtspor, Tekirova Belediyespor.
- Group 2: Adıyamanspor, Batman Petrolspor, Belediye Bingölspor, Bursa Nilüferspor, Derince Belediyespor, Sivas Dört Eylül Belediyespor, Hacettepe, Manavgat Evrensekispor, Menemen Belediyespor, Refahiyespor, Silivrispor, Trabzon Kanuni FK, Ümraniyespor.
- Group 3: Arsinspor, Beylerbeyi, Çorum Belediyespor, Darıca Gençlerbirliği, Elazığ Belediyespor, Erzurum BB, Kahramanmaraş Belediyespor, Keçiörengücü, Kocaelispor, Maltepe, Oyak Renaultspor, Sancaktepe Belediyespor, Yimpaş Yozgatspor.

== See also ==
- 2013–14 Turkish Cup
- 2013–14 Süper Lig
- 2013–14 TFF First League
- 2013–14 TFF Second League
