= 1993–94 Turkish Cup =

Türkiye Kupası

Tournament details
- Country: Turkey
- Teams: 139

Final positions
- Champions: Beşiktaş
- Runners-up: Galatasaray

Tournament statistics
- Matches played: 141
- Goals scored: 437 (3.1 per match)
- Top goal scorer(s): Shota Arveladze; Saffet Sancaklı (4 goals each)

The 1993–94 Turkish Cup was the 32nd edition of the tournament that determined the association football Süper Lig Turkish Cup (Turkish: Türkiye Kupası) champion under the auspices of the Turkish Football Federation (Turkish: Türkiye Futbol Federasyonu; TFF). champion under the auspices of the Turkish Football Federation (Turkish: Türkiye Futbol Federasyonu; TFF). Beşiktaş successfully contested Galatasaray on both legs of the finals. The results of the tournament also determined which clubs would be promoted or relegated.

== First round ==
Team 1	Score	Team 2
Artvin İl Özel İdaresi	0–1	Trabzon PTT
Batman Petrolspor	2–0	Bitlis Köy Hizmetleri
Bingölspor	4–1	Elazığspor
İzmirspor	3–2 (aet)	Manisaspor
Keçiörengücü	3–4	Petrol Ofisi
Şanlıurfaspor	2–0	Mardinspor
Şekerspor	2–0 (aet)	Beypazarıspor
Adıyamanspor	1–2	İskenderunspor
Akçaabat Sebatspor	1–0	Çaykur Rizespor
Erzincanspor	3–2	Bayburtspor
Kars Köy Hizmetleri	0–1	Tek 12 Martspor
Malatyaspor	3–1	Muşspor
Orduspor	2–1	Giresunspor
Siirt Köy Hizmetleri	1–0	Vanspor
Ünyespor	0–3	Erzurumspor
Adana Demirspor	2–1	Hatayspor
Ceyhan Belediyespor	3–4	İçel Polisgücü
Düzcespor	3–1 (aet)	Gölcükspor
Eskişehirspor	2–1	Boluspor
Kahramanmaraşspor	1–0 (aet)	Adanaspor
Kastamonuspor	1–1 (5–4 p)	Erdemir Ereğlispor
Mersin İdman Yurdu	3–1	Tarsus İdman Yurdu
Merzifonspor	1–2 (aet)	Sivasspor
Nevşehirspor	3–0	Erciyesspor
Niğdespor	1–2	Osmaniyespor
Nizip Belediyespor	2–1	Adana Polisgücü
Tokatspor	1–0	Erbaaspor
Konyaspor	4–1	Alanyaspor
Yimpaş Yozgatspor	0–0 (3–2 p)	Çorumspor
Zonguldakspor	4–0	Yeni Sincanspor
Yeni Afyonspor	0–2	TKİ Soma Linyitspor
Anadoluhisarı İdman Yurdu	1–1 (4-5 p)	Sümerbank Beykoz
Ankara Emniyetspor	1–0	Çubukspor
Antalya Köy Hizmetleri	1–1 (1–2 p)	Antalya Ormanspor
Antalyaspor	5–1	Ispartaspor
Ayvalıkgücü Belediyespor	3–4 (aet)	Balıkesirspor
Babaeskispor	1–0	Edirnespor
Bakırköyspor	1–0	Küçükçekmecespor
Bergamaspor	2–0	Aliağa Petkimspor
Bozüyükspor	1–2	Sönmez Filamentspor
Çengelköy	6–2	Vefa
Denizlispor	3–1	Aydınspor
Gaziosmanpaşa	0–1	İstanbulspor
Gebzespor	3–2	Tekirdağspor
Gönenspor	3–1 (aet)	Bigaspor
Göztepe	1–2	Çanakkale Dardanelspor
İnegölspor	0–2	Bandırmaspor
İstanbul BB	1–0	Eyüpspor
Kemer Belediyespor	4–1	Karamanspor
Küçükköyspor	3–2	Karagümrük
Muğlaspor	1–1 (4–3 p)	Sökespor
Nazilli Belediyespor	1–4	Yeni Salihlispor
Sakaryaspor	1–0	Mudurnuspor
TKİ Tavşanlı Linyitspor	1–0	Uşakspor
Torbalıspor	5–2	Marmarisspor
Turgutluspor	3–2 (aet)	Bucaspor
PTT	1–2	Bafraspor
Üsküdar Anadolu	3–1	Çorluspor
Yalovaspor	3–0	Kütahyaspor
Yeşilova	1–0	Manisa Sümerbankspor
Batman Belediyespor	2–4	Diyarbakırspor

== Second round ==
Team 1	Score	Team 2
Trabzon PTT	2–0	Tek 12 Martspor
Sakaryaspor	1–0	Eskişehirspor
Batman Petrolspor	0–1	Bingölspor
Diyarbakırspor	2–1	Siirt Köy Hizmetleri
Erzincanspor	3–2	Sivasspor
Erzurumspor	1–0	Akçaabat Sebatspor
Malatyaspor	1–0	Kahramanmaraşspor
Nizip Belediyespor	1–2 (aet)	Şanlıurfaspor
Ankara Emniyetspor	1–5	Şekerspor
İskenderunspor	3–2	Adana Demirspor
Kastamonuspor	1–1 (3–2 p)	Düzcespor
Nevşehirspor	2–0	Tokatspor
Osmaniyespor	2–0	İçel Polisgücü
Petrol Ofisi	1–0	Yimpaş Yozgatspor
Konyaspor	2–1 (aet)	Mersin İdman Yurdu
Zonguldakspor	2–1	İstanbul BB
Bafraspor	2–1 (aet)	Orduspor
Antalya Ormanspor	0–1 (aet)	Kemer Belediyespor
Babaeskispor	2–1	Küçükköyspor
Balıkesirspor	0–4	Çanakkale Dardanelspor
Bandırmaspor	0–0 (2–3 p)	Yalovaspor
Sümerbank Beykoz	2–0	Çengelköy
İstanbulspor	2–0	Bakırköyspor
Muğlaspor	0–4	Antalyaspor
Sönmez Filamentspor	0–4	Gebzespor
TKİ Tavşanlı Linyitspor	2–3	Gönenspor
Torbalıspor	4–1	Bergamaspor
Turgutluspor	2–3	Denizlispor
Üsküdar Anadolu	2–5	Kartalspor
Yeni Salihlispor	4–1	İzmirspor
Yeşilova	2–1	TKİ Soma Linyitspor

== Third round ==
Team 1	Score	Team 2
Sümerbank Beykoz	3–0	Babaeskispor
Denizlispor	2–1	Antalyaspor
Diyarbakırspor	3–0	Malatyaspor
Erzincanspor	1–0 (aet)	Bingölspor
Erzurumspor	w/o	Bafraspor
Gebzespor	2–1	Gönenspor
İskenderunspor	1–4	Konyaspor
İstanbulspor	1–0	Sakaryaspor
Kastamonuspor	2–0	Trabzon PTT
Nevşehirspor	2–1 (aet)	Şekerspor
Petrol Ofisi	0–1	Zonguldakspor
Şanlıurfaspor	1–2	Osmaniyespor
Yalovaspor	2–1	Kartalspor
Yeni Salihlispor	0–0 (4–5 p)	Çanakkale Dardanelspor
Yeşilova	3–0	Kemer Belediyespor

== Fourth round ==
Team 1	Score	Team 2
Sümerbank Beykoz	2–1 (aet)	Gebzespor
Denizlispor	4–0	Çanakkale Dardanelspor
Erzincanspor	4–0	Kastamonuspor
İstanbulspor	1–0	Yalovaspor
Osmaniyespor	3–3 (1–3 p)	Nevşehirspor
Konyaspor	4–0	Diyarbakırspor
Yeşilova	3–1	Torbalıspor
Zonguldakspor	2–1	Erzurumspor

== Fifth round ==
Team 1	Score	Team 2
Denizlispor	1–1 (5–4 p)	Gaziantepspor
Kardemir Karabükspor	3–2 (aet)	Karşıyaka
Zeytinburnuspor	0–2	Bursaspor
Sarıyer	1–0	İstanbulspor
Altay	4–0	Erzincanspor
Ankaragücü	1–0	Zonguldakspor
Yeşilova	1–0	Konyaspor
Nevşehirspor	4–0	Sümerbank Beykoz

== Sixth round ==
Team 1	Score	Team 2
Kocaelispor	5–0	Yeşilova
Samsunspor	3–1 (aet)	Kardemir Karabükspor
Kayserispor	2–0	Bursaspor
Denizlispor	0–1	Galatasaray
Trabzonspor	4–0	Nevşehirspor
Sarıyer	1–1 (4–2 p)	Gençlerbirliği
Altay	1–4	Fenerbahçe
Beşiktaş	2–0	Ankaragücü

== Quarter-finals ==
Team 1	Score	Team 2
Kayseri Emniyetspor Erciyesspor	2–3	Galatasaray
Kocaelispor	4–3	Samsunspor
Trabzonspor	7–0	Sarıyer
Beşiktaş	2–1	Fenerbahçe

== Semi-finals ==
=== Summary table ===
Team 1	Agg.	Team 2	1st leg	2nd leg
Kocaelispor	2–3	Galatasaray	2–1	0–2
Beşiktaş	4–2	Trabzonspor	3–1	1–1

=== 1st leg ===
9 February 1994 Semi-final	Kocaelispor	2–1	Galatasaray	İzmit
12:00 EET (UTC+02)	Osman 52'; Arif 90'		Götz 72' (pen.)	Stadium: İsmet Paşa Stadium; Referee: Metin Tokat

9 February 1994 Semi-final	Beşiktaş	3–1	Trabzonspor	Istanbul
19:00 EET (UTC+02)	Ali 24'; Kadir 58'; Metin 89'		A. Arveladze 13'	Stadium: BJK İnönü Stadium; Referee: Bülent Yavuz

=== 2nd leg ===
9 March 1994 Semi-final	Trabzonspor	1–1	Beşiktaş	Trabzon
12:30 EET (UTC+02)	Recep 43' (o.g.)		Feyyaz 78'	Stadium: Hüseyin Avni Aker Stadium; Referee: Oğuz Sarvan

9 March 1994 Semi-final	Galatasaray	2–0	Kocaelispor	Istanbul
19:30 EET (UTC+02)	Hakan 52' (pen.), 77'			Stadium: Ali Sami Yen Stadium; Referee: Ünsal Çimen

== Final ==
=== 1st leg ===
6 April 1994 Final	Galatasaray	0–0	Beşiktaş	Istanbul, Turkey
19:00 EEST (UTC+03)				Stadium: Ali Sami Yen Stadium; Referee: Bülent Yavuz

=== 2nd leg ===
4 May 1994 Final	Beşiktaş	3–2	Galatasaray	Istanbul, Turkey
18:30 EEST (UTC+03)	Metin 15'; Madida 22'; Alpay 83'		Hakan 11'; Bülent 78'	Stadium: BJK İnönü Stadium; Referee: Ahmet Çakar
