= 2012–13 TFF 2. Lig =

Second League
- Season: 2012–13
- Champions: White Group League; Balıkesirspor; Red Group League; Kahramanmaraşspor
- Promoted: Balıkesirspor; Kahramanmaraşspor; Fethiyespor
- Relegated: Sakaryaspor; Ünyespor; Şekerspor; Denizli Belediyespor
- Matches: White Group League; 272; Red Group League; 272
- Highest scoring: White Group League; İNE7-2EYÜ; Red Group League; NAZ3-3SAR; BUG3-3NAZ; ÇAN2-4PEN

The 2012–13 Second League (known as the Spor Toto 2. Lig for sponsorship reasons) is the third level in the Turkish football. The season began on 9 September 2012. In end of the 2012–2013 season, 4 teams (2 teams in each group) relegate to TFF Third League and 6 teams promote from TFF Third League. Because 36 teams (18 teams in each group) will be competing in 2013–2014 season.

The following are the results to the 2012-2013 TFF Second League.

== White Group League table ==
Pos	Team	Pld	W	D	L	GF	GA	GD	Pts	Qualification or relegation
1	Balıkesirspor (C, P)	32	20	9	3	46	20	+26	69	Promotion to TFF First League
2	İnegölspor	32	16	9	7	52	33	+19	57	Qualification for Promotion Playoffs
3	Yeni Malatyaspor	32	14	14	4	21	28	−7	56	Qualification for Promotion Playoffs
4	Tokatspor	32	14	9	9	49	40	+9	51	Qualification for Promotion Playoffs
5	Bayrampaşaspor	32	14	7	11	43	36	+7	49	Qualification for Promotion Playoffs
6	Gölbaşıspor A.Ş.	32	11	12	9	42	41	+1	45	
7	Altay	32	10	12	10	33	33	0	42	
8	Kırklarelispor	32	10	12	10	33	40	−7	42	
9	Alanyaspor	32	12	5	15	34	33	+1	41	
10	Körfez İskenderun Spor	32	10	8	14	27	37	−10	38	
11	Konya Anadolu Selçukspor	32	9	11	12	32	32	0	38	
12	Kocaeli Birlik Spor	32	10	8	14	36	46	−10	38	
13	Eyüpspor	32	10	8	14	35	50	−15	38	
14	Gaziosmanpaşa	32	8	12	12	33	36	−3	36	
15	Ofspor A.Ş.	32	9	8	15	28	44	−16	35	
16	Denizli Belediyespor (R)	32	8	10	14	29	42	−13	34	Relegation to TFF Third League
17	Şekerspor (R)	32	6	8	18	22	35	−13	26	Relegation to TFF Third League

Source: TFF Second League page
Rules for classification: 1) points; 2) goal difference; 3) number of goals scored.
(C) Champions; (P) Promoted; (R) Relegated

== Red Group League table ==
Pos	Team	Pld	W	D	L	GF	GA	GD	Pts	Qualification or relegation
1	Kahramanmaraşspor A.Ş. (C, P)	32	18	8	6	53	30	+23	62	Promotion to TFF First League
2	Hatayspor	32	14	13	5	46	26	+20	55	Qualification for Promotion Playoffs
3	Bugsaşspor	32	14	13	5	42	31	+11	55	Denied entry to the Playoffs (Note: Due to Bugsaşspor's relationship with Ankaraspor, the TFF decided to replace them for the Playoffs with the 6th placed Nazilli Belediyespor. (in Turkish))
4	Tepecikspor A.Ş.	32	15	9	8	47	36	+11	54	Qualification for Promotion Playoffs
5	Fethiyespor (P)	32	15	8	9	49	32	+17	53	Qualification for Promotion Playoffs
6	Nazilli Belediyespor	32	14	11	7	54	34	+20	53	Qualification for Promotion Playoffs
7	Bandırmaspor	32	10	14	8	36	34	+2	44	
8	Çankırı Belediyespor	32	11	10	11	36	39	−3	43	
9	Pendikspor	32	11	8	13	35	33	+2	41	
10	Bozüyükspor	32	10	11	11	37	38	−1	41	
11	Tarsus İ.Y.	32	9	11	12	32	35	−3	38	
12	Turgutluspor	32	8	13	11	29	33	−4	37	
13	Sarıyer	32	8	11	13	37	49	−12	35	
14	Güngörenspor	32	8	10	14	23	32	−9	34	
15	Giresunspor	32	8	10	14	32	42	−10	34	
16	Ünyespor (R)	32	4	13	15	18	47	−29	25	Relegation to TFF Third League
17	Sakaryaspor (R)	32	4	9	19	30	65	−35	21	Relegation to TFF Third League

Source: TFF Second League page
Rules for classification: 1) points; 2) goal difference; 3) number of goals scored.
(C) Champions; (P) Promoted; (R) Relegated

== Promotion playoffs ==
- All matches were played at Konya Atatürk Stadium.

=== Quarterfinals ===
Team 1	Score	Team 2
Tokatspor	1–3	Hatayspor
Nazilli Belediyespor	0–1 (a.e.t.)	Bayrampaşaspor
Yeni Malatyaspor	3–2	Tepecikspor A.Ş.
Fethiyespor	1–0	İnegölspor

=== Semifinals ===
Team 1	Score	Team 2
Hatayspor	3–1	Bayrampaşaspor
Yeni Malatyaspor	2–4 (a.e.t.)	Fethiyespor

=== Final ===
Team 1	Score	Team 2
Hatayspor	1–2	Fethiyespor
