= List of football stadiums in Turkey =

The following is a list of football stadiums in Turkey, ranked in order of capacity, with the minimum capacity being 8,000. Stadiums in bold are part of the 2023–24 Süper Lig.

== Current stadiums ==
#	Image	Stadium	Capacity	City	Home team(s)	Opened
1		Atatürk Olympic Stadium	77,563	Istanbul	Turkey; Fatih Karagümrük	2002
2		**Rams Park**	53,387	Istanbul	Galatasaray	2011
3		İzmir Atatürk Stadium	51,337	İzmir	None	1971
4		**Şükrü Saracoğlu Stadium**	47,911	Istanbul	Fenerbahçe	1908
5		Centennial Atatürk Stadium	43,361	Bursa	Bursaspor	2015
6		**Beşiktaş Stadium**	42,684	Istanbul	Beşiktaş	2016
7		**Konya Metropolitan Municipality Stadium**	41,600	Konya	Konyaspor	2014
8		**Şenol Güneş Sports Complex**	41,000	Trabzon	Trabzonspor	2017
9		**Kocaeli Stadium**	34,829	İzmit	Kocaelispor	2017
10		**Samsun 19 Mayıs Stadium**	34,303	Samsun	Samsunspor	2017
11		**Diyarbakır Stadium**	33,000	Diyarbakır	Amedspor; Diyarbekirspor	2018
12		New Eskişehir Stadium	32,500	Eskişehir	Eskişehirspor	2016
13		Kadir Has Stadium	31,856	Kayseri	Kayserispor	2009
14		New Adana Stadium	30,960	Adana	Adana Demirspor; Adanaspor	2021
15		**Gaziantep Stadium**	30,320	Gaziantep	Gaziantep F.K.	2017
16		Antalya Stadium	29,307	Antalya	Antalyaspor	2015
17		New Sakarya Stadium	28,154	Adapazarı	Sakaryaspor	2017
18		New Sivas 4 Eylül Stadium	27,817	Sivas	Sivasspor	2016
19		New Malatya Stadium	25,745	Malatya	Yeni Malatyaspor	2017
20		Mersin Arena	25,497	Mersin	Yeni Mersin İdmanyurdu	2013
21		Ay-Yıldız Stadium	25,000	Karabük	Kardemir Karabükspor	2014
22		New Hatay Stadium	25,000	Antakya	Hatayspor	2021
23		**Gürsel Aksel Stadium**	23,376	İzmir	Göztepe	2020
24		Şanlıurfa 11 Nisan Stadium	21,541	Şanlıurfa	Şanlıurfaspor	2009
25		**Kazım Karabekir Stadium**	21,374	Erzurum	Erzurumspor	2011
26		Çotanak Stadyumu	21,166	Giresun	Giresunspor	2021
27		**Eryaman Stadium**	20,560	Ankara	Ankaragücü; Gençlerbirliği	2019
28		Denizli Atatürk Stadium	18,745	Denizli	Denizlispor	1950
29		Elazığ Atatürk Stadium	18,423	Elazığ	Elazığspor	2023
30		Yenikent Stadium	18,029	Ankara	Osmanlıspor	1974
31		**Başakşehir Fatih Terim Stadium**	17,156	Istanbul	Başakşehir	2014
32		New Ordu Stadium	16,768	Ordu	Orduspor	2021
33		Manisa 19 Mayıs Stadium	16,066	Manisa	Manisa F.K.	2009
34		Zeytinburnu Stadium	16,000	Istanbul	Zeytinburnuspor	1984
35		Gebze Alaettin Kurt Stadium	15,462	Gebze	Gebzespor	1995
36		**Rize City Stadium**	15,332	Rize	Rizespor	2009
37		Gazi Mustafa Kemal Atatürk Stadium	15,000	Tire	Tire 1922 Spor	2018
38		**New Çorum Stadium**	15,000	Çorum	Çorum F.K.	2019
39		Batman Arena	15,000	Batman	Batman Petrolspor	2018
40		New Karaman Stadium	15,000	Karaman	Karamanspor	2023
41		Alsancak Mustafa Denizli Stadium	15,000	İzmir	Altay SK, Altınordu F.K.	2021
42		Zafer Stadium	14,558	Afyonkarahisar	Afjet Afyonspor	2014
43		Burdur Mehmet Akif Ersoy Üniversity Stadium	14,500	Burdur	Yeni Burdurspor	2021
44		**Recep Tayyip Erdoğan Stadium**	13,856	Istanbul	Kasımpaşa	2005
45		Kemal Köksal Stadium	13,795	Zonguldak	Zonguldak Kömürspor	1940
46		Balıkesir Atatürk Stadium	13,732	Balıkesir	Balıkesirspor	1953
47		Erzincan 13 Şubat Şehir Stadium	12,981	Erzincan	24 Erzincanspor	2022
48		Bandırma 17 Eylül Stadium	12,725	Bandırma	Bandırmaspor	1995
49		Akhisar Stadium	12,139	Akhisar	Akhisarspor	2018
50		Dr. Necmettin Şeyhoğlu Stadium	11,378	Karabük	Kardemir Karabükspor	2014
51		Adnan Menderes Stadium	11,988	Aydın	Aydınspor 1923	1950
52		**Alanya Oba Stadium**	10,842	Alanya	Alanyaspor	2011
53		18 Mart Stadium	10,500	Çanakkale	Çanakkale Dardanelspor	
54		Ünye İlçe Stadium	10,340	Ünye	Ünyespor	
55		Artvin Şehir Stadium	10,000	Artvin	Artvin Murgulspor	
56		Vali Lütfü Yiğenoğlu Stadium	10,000	Ağrı	Ağrıspor	
57		Sinop City Stadium	10,000	Sinop	Sinopspor	2023
58		Doğanlar Stadium	9,138	İzmir	Altınordu F.K.	2017

== Future stadiums ==
=== Under construction ===
Stadium	Capacity	City	Home team	Opening
New Ankara Stadium	51,160	Ankara	Turkey national football team	2026
New Turgutlu Stadium	12,000	Turgutlu	Turgutluspor	TBD

=== Proposed ===
Stadium	Capacity	City	Home team
New İzmir Stadium	41,540	İzmir	
New Edirne Stadium	22,000	Edirne	Edirnespor
New Denizli Stadium	22,000	Denizli	Denizlispor
New Karşıyaka Stadium	15,000	İzmir	Karşıyaka
Ahi Stadium	15,000	Kırşehir	Kırşehir FK
New İskenderun Stadium	12,000	İskenderun	Körfez İskenderunspor

== New stadiums built after 2000 ==
Map showing new stadiums built after 2000

== See also ==
- List of Asian stadiums by capacity
- List of European stadiums by capacity
- List of association football stadiums by capacity
- List of association football stadiums by country
- List of sports venues by capacity
- Lists of stadiums
