= Murat İbrahim Uslu =

Turkish footballer

Personal information
- Full name: Murat İbrahim Uslu
- Date of birth: July 17, 1978 (age 48)
- Place of birth: Gülşehir, Nevşehir, Turkey
- Position: Goalkeeper

Senior career*
Years	Team	Apps	(Gls)
1996–1999	Gaskispor	53	(0)
1997–1998	→ Gaziantep B.B. (loan)	0	(0)
1999–2001	Gaziantep B.B.	37	(0)
2001–2004	Gaziantepspor	0	(0)
2002	→ Hatayspor (loan)	1	(0)
2002–2003	→ Gaziantep B.B. (loan)	18	(0)
2004–2007	Karabükspor	38	(0)
2007–2008	Mersin İdmanyurdu	0	(0)
2008	Bucaspor	1	(0)
2008–2009	Çankırı B.S.	3	(0)
2009–2011	Karabükspor	0	(0)
2011	Adıyamanspor		
- * Club domestic league appearances and goals as of 17 February 2011

Murat İbrahim Uslu (born 17 July 1978) is a Turkish former professional footballer.
