= Arif Şahin =

Turkish footballer (born 1985)

Arif Sahin
Personal information
- Full name: Arif Sahin
- Date of birth: 22 December 1985 (age 40)
- Place of birth: Eskişehir, Turkey
- Height: 1.72 m (5 ft 7 1/2 in)
- Position: Midfielder

Team information
- Current team: Elazığ Belediyespor
- Number: 10

Senior career*
Years	Team	Apps	(Gls)
2007–2009	Sakaryaspor	2	(0)
2009–2013	Elazığspor	57	(16)
2013	Kayseri Erciyesspor	12	(0)
2013–2014	Samsunspor	26	(2)
2014	Gaziantep BB	1	(0)
2014–2015	Antalyaspor	13	(2)
2015–2016	Giresunspor	10	(0)
2016	Boluspor	7	(0)
2016–2017	Tuzlaspor	24	(2)
2017–2018	Bugsas Spor	6	(1)
2018	Yeşil Bursa	5	(0)
2018	İnegölspor	4	(0)
2019–	Elazığ Belediyespor	8	(0)
- * Club domestic league appearances and goals as of 15 March 2019

Arif Sahin (born 22 December 1985) is a Turkish footballer who plays for Elazığ Belediyespor in the Turkish TFF Third League.
