= Mustafa İnan (footballer) =

Turkish footballer

Personal information
- Date of birth: 24 January 2000 (age 26)
- Place of birth: Antalya, Turkey
- Position: Midfielder

Team information
- Current team: Eskişehirspor
- Number: 6

Youth career
- 2011–2012: Büyükşehir Belediyesispor
- 2012: Meydan Gençlikspor
- 2012–2017: Antalyaspor

Senior career*
Years	Team	Apps	(Gls)
2017–2021	Antalyaspor	0	(0)
2019	→ Kemerspor 2003 (loan)	9	(0)
2020–2021	→ Antalya Kemer (loan)	5	(0)
2021–2023	24 Erzincanspor	14	(1)
2023–2024	Batman Petrolspor	26	(1)
2024–2025	Manisa	2	(0)
2025	Yeni Mersin İY	12	(0)
2025–	Eskişehirspor	9	(0)
- * Club domestic league appearances and goals as of 9 November 2025

Mustafa İnan (born 24 January 2000) is a Turkish professional footballer who plays as a midfielder for TFF 3. Lig club Eskişehirspor.

== Club career ==
Mustafa joined Antalyaspor in 2012 after shining in a local school tournament, and signed his first contract with them in 2017. Mustafa made his professional debut for Antalyaspor in a 3–1 Turkish Cup loss to Kayserispor on 27 December 2017, at the age of 17.

== International career ==
Mustafa was called up to the Turkey national under-18 football team in November 2017, but did not make an appearance at that time.
