= Ayyıldız =

Ayyıldız (star and crescent) is a Turkish compound word consisting of ay (crescent) and yıldız (star). It may refer to:

- Ay-yıldız, the national emblem of Turkey
- Ayyıldız, Oltu, a neighborhood in Oltu district of Erzurum, Turkey
- Ay-Yıldız Stadium, a stadium in Karabük, Turkey
- Crescent Star Party (Turkey), a Turkish political party
- Şilan Ayyıldız (born 1999), Turkish female middle-distance runner
