= Yılmaz Basravi =

Turkish footballer

Personal information
- Date of birth: 13 March 2000 (age 26)
- Place of birth: Kızıltepe, Turkey
- Height: 1.80 m (5 ft 11 in)
- Position: Winger

Team information
- Current team: Malatya Yeşilyurtspor
- Number: 27

Youth career
- 2011–2016: Elitspor
- 2016–2018: Balçova
- 2018–2020: Göztepe

Senior career*
Years	Team	Apps	(Gls)
2020–2023	Göztepe	1	(0)
2021–2022	→ Tarsus İY (loan)	27	(3)
2022–2023	→ Nazilli Belediyespor (loan)	9	(2)
2023	→ Alanya Kestelspor (loan)	15	(7)
2023–2024	Kepez Spor Futbol	25	(11)
2024–2026	Ankara Keçiörengücü	9	(0)
2025	→ Ankaraspor (loan)	15	(7)
2025–2026	→ 52 Orduspor (loan)	21	(5)
2026–	Malatya Yeşilyurtspor	4	(1)
- * Club domestic league appearances and goals as of 1 November 2026

Yılmaz Basravi (born 13 March 2000) is a Turkish professional footballer who plays as a winger for TFF 3. Lig club Malatya Yeşilyurtspor.

== Career ==
Basravi is a youth product of the academies of Elitspor, Balçovas, and Göztepe. On 28 October 2020, he signed his first professional contract with Göztepe. He made his professional debut with Göztepe in a 5–3 Süper Lig loss to Gençlerbirliği on 11 May 2021.
