= Taner Taktak =

Belgian-Turkish footballer

Personal information
- Date of birth: 26 January 1990 (age 36)
- Place of birth: Maaseik, Belgium
- Position: Left winger

Youth career
- 1999–2005: Cercle Maasmechelen
- 2005–2009: Fortuna Sittard

Senior career*
Years	Team	Apps	(Gls)
2009–2010	Fortuna Sittard	30	(2)
2010–2011	Hacettepe	10	(0)
2011–2012	Patro Eisden	13	(1)
2012–2013	Sumgayit	20	(1)
2013–2014	Sandıklıspor	4	(0)
2014–2016	Patro Eisden	38	(3)
2016–2017	Helson Helchteren	23	(1)
2017	Spouwen-Mopertingen	2	(0)
2017–	KVK Beringen		

International career
2006–2007	Turkey U17	18	(1)
2007–2008	Turkey U18	16	(1)
2007–2008	Turkey U19	7	(0)
- * Club domestic league appearances and goals

Taner Taktak (born 26 January 1990) is a Belgian-Turkish footballer who plays as a left winger for Belgian Division 3 club KVK Beringen.

== Club career ==
Taktak made his professional debut on 22 February 2008, playing for Fortuna Sittard against FC Eindhoven in the Dutch Eerste Divisie. He came on as a late substitute for Danny Schreurs in a 3–0 win.

On 8 January 2010, Taktak signed with TFF First League club Hacettepe, alongside Fortuna teammate Abdülkerim Öcal. However, he left the club in disappointing fashion after failing to play consistently and not being paid all of his salary. In 2012, Taktak signed for Azerbaijani club Sumgayit before joining Sandıklıspor in the Turkish fourth division, after a move to Fethiyespor failed.

After that, he played for Belgian lower league teams Patro Eisden, KFC Helson Helchteren, Spouwen-Mopertingen and KVK Beringen.
