= Hüseyin Kala =

Turkish footballer (born 1987)

Personal information
- Full name: Hüseyin Kala
- Date of birth: May 5, 1987 (age 39)
- Place of birth: Antakya, Hatay, Turkey
- Height: 1.84 m (6 ft 0 in)
- Position: Winger

Team information
- Current team: BB Bodrumspor
- Number: 10

Youth career
- 2001–2005: Antakyaspor

Senior career*
Years	Team	Apps	(Gls)
2005–2006	Antakyaspor	23	(2)
2006	Hatayspor	3	(0)
2007–2010	Etimesgut Şekerspor	85	(19)
2010–2014	Kasımpaşa	66	(5)
2014	Kayseri Erciyesspor	7	(0)
2014–2016	Adana Demirspor	54	(3)
2016–2018	Şanlıurfaspor	52	(17)
2018–	BB Bodrumspor	23	(3)
- * Club domestic league appearances and goals as of 5 October 2019

Hüseyin Kala (born 5 May 1987) is a Turkish professional footballer who plays as a winger for BB Bodrumspor.

== Club career ==
Kala began his career with local club Antakyaspor in 2001. He spent four years with the youth teams before signing his first professional contract on 1 September 2005, making 23 appearances in his only season with the senior team. Another local club, Hatayspor, transferred him at the end of the season. He made three appearances before his contract was terminated on 29 December 2006. Etimesgut Şekerspor signed Kala on a free transfer on 29 January 2007. He spent three and a half years with the club, making 85 appearances while scoring 19 goals. The club terminated his contract on 28 May 2010. Kasımpaşa signed him on a free transfer three months later. Kala started his career with the club in the reserves. He made his Süper Lig debut on 27 September 2010. Kala signed for Adana Demirspor as they won promotion the same season.
