= Hakan Hacıbektaşoğlu =

Turkish footballer (born 1984)

Personal information
- Full name: Hakan Hacıbektaşoğlu
- Date of birth: 23 April 1984 (age 42)
- Place of birth: Istanbul, Turkey
- Height: 1.81 m (5 ft 11 1/2 in)
- Position: Defensive midfielder

Youth career
- 1999–2003: Beşiktaş

Senior career*
Years	Team	Apps	(Gls)
2003–2004	Beşiktaş	0	(0)
2004	Fatih Karagümrük	6	(0)
2004–2005	Adanaspor	21	(1)
2005–2006	Mardinspor	7	(0)
2006	→ Ünyespor (loan)	16	(0)
2006–2007	Alanyaspor	32	(2)
2007–2009	Adanaspor	42	(0)
2009–2010	Samsunspor	9	(1)
2010–2011	Elazığspor	20	(0)
2011–2012	Göztepe	36	(5)
2012–2014	Çaykur Rizespor	11	(0)
2014–2015	Bayrampaşaspor	2	(0)
2015	Pendikspor	10	(0)
2015–2016	Pazarspor	6	(0)
2016	Turgutluspor	8	(0)
- * Club domestic league appearances and goals as of 24 August 2015

Hakan Hacıbektaşoğlu (born 23 April 1984) is a Turkish professional footballer.
