= Numan Çürüksu =

Turkish footballer (born 1984)

Personal information
- Full name: Numan Çürüksu
- Date of birth: 2 December 1984 (age 41)
- Place of birth: Trabzon, Turkey
- Position: Centre back

Team information
- Current team: Kocaelispor
- Number: 61

Senior career*
Years	Team	Apps	(Gls)
2006–2007	Sürmenespor	21	(1)
2007–2010	Ofspor	68	(4)
2010–2012	Orduspor	34	(0)
2012–2014	Kayseri Erciyesspor	30	(0)
2014–2019	Osmanlıspor	135	(5)
2019–2020	Giresunspor	27	(0)
2020–	Kocaelispor	0	(0)
- * Club domestic league appearances and goals as of 00:36, 6 July 2020 (UTC)

Numan Çürüksu (born 2 December 1984 in Trabzon) is a Turkish footballer who plays for Kocaelispor.

Numan made his debut in professional football in the year 2006 season as part of the Sürmenespor squad.
