= Tufan Kelleci =

Turkish footballer

Personal information
- Date of birth: 24 October 1993 (age 33)
- Place of birth: Şahinbey, Turkey
- Height: 1.75 m (5 ft 9 in)
- Position: Right-back

Youth career
- Offenburger FV
- SC Freiburg
- 2010–2012: Gaziantepspor

Senior career*
Years	Team	Apps	(Gls)
2012–2014	Gaziantepspor	2	(0)
2013	→ Bugsaşspor (loan)	2	(0)
2013–2014	→ Altay (loan)	17	(4)
2014–2015	Somaspor	16	(3)
2015–2016	Manisa BB	21	(1)
2016–2017	Adana Demirspor	9	(0)
2017–2018	Sakaryaspor	36	(2)
2018–2019	Gümüşhanespor	15	(0)
2019–2021	Elazığspor	26	(1)
2021	Serik Belediyespor	11	(0)
2021–2022	Tarsus IY	13	(0)
2022	Sivas Belediyespor	10	(1)
2023	Eskişehirspor	12	(1)
2023–2024	TuS Mechtersheim	20	(9)
2024	FC Cosmos Koblenz	11	(6)

International career
2012	Turkey U19	3	(0)
2012–2013	Turkey U20	6	(0)
- * Club domestic league appearances and goals as of 22:18, 23 July 2024 (UTC)

Tufan Kelleci (born 24 October 1993) is a Turkish professional footballer who most recently played as a right-back for German Oberliga Rheinland-Pfalz/Saar club FC Cosmos Koblenz. He made his Süper Lig debut on 19 January 2013.

== Career ==
=== Elazığspor ===
On the last day of the January transfer market 2019, Kelleci was one of 22 players on two hours, that signed for Turkish club Elazığspor. had been placed under a transfer embargo but managed to negotiate it with the Turkish FA, leading to them going on a mad spree of signing and registering a load of players despite not even having a permanent manager in place. In just two hours, they managed to snap up a record 22 players - 12 coming in on permanent contracts and a further 10 joining on loan deals until the end of the season.
