= Taha Cengiz Demirtaş =

Turkish footballer

Taha Demirtaş
Personal information
- Full name: Taha Cengiz Demirtaş
- Date of birth: 15 May 1994 (age 32)
- Place of birth: Altındağ, Ankara, Turkey
- Height: 1.93 m (6 ft 4 in)
- Position: Goalkeeper

Team information
- Current team: Adana 01 FK

Youth career
- 2006–2011: Gençlerbirliği
- 2010–2011: → Hacettepe (loan)
- 2011–2012: Hacettepe

Senior career*
Years	Team	Apps	(Gls)
2012–2016	Hacettepe	61	(0)
2016–2019	Gençlerbirliği	2	(0)
2019–2020	Ümraniyespor	0	(0)
2020–2021	Zonguldak Kömürspor	12	(0)
2021	Hacettepe	4	(0)
2021–2023	Sivas Belediyespor	59	(0)
2023–2024	Ankara Demirspor	33	(0)
2024–2025	Kırklarelispor	4	(0)
2025	Vanspor	10	(0)
2025–	Adana 01 FK	7	(0)

International career
2008	Turkey U15	2	(0)
2008–2010	Turkey U16	4	(0)
- * Club domestic league appearances and goals as of 5 October 2025

Taha Cengiz Demirtaş (born 15 May 1994) is a Turkish professional footballer who plays as a goalkeeper for TFF 2. Lig club Adana 01 FK.

== Professional career ==
Demirtaş made his debut for Gençlerbirliği in a 1-0 Süper Lig win over Bursaspor on 18 May 2018.

== International career ==
Demirtaş has represented the Turkish Football Federation at the U15 and U16 levels.
