= 12 February Stadium =

Multi-purpose stadium in Kahramanmaraş, Turkey

Coordinates: 37°34′25″N 36°55′24″E

- 12 Şubat Stadyumu
- Interactive map of 12 February Stadium
- Location: Kahramanmaraş, Turkey
- Capacity: 15,000
- Surface: Turf

Construction
- Opened: 1970
- Renovated: 1996, 2009
- Demolished: 2023

Tenants
- Kahramanmaraşspor, 1920 Maraşspor

12 February Stadium (Turkish: 12 Şubat Stadyumu) was a multi-purpose stadium in Kahramanmaraş, Turkey. It was used mostly for football matches and was the home ground of TFF Second League team Kahramanmaraşspor.

The stadium was built in 1970 and held 15,000 people.
