= Mert Özyıldırım =

Turkish footballer

Personal information
- Date of birth: 28 February 1995 (age 31)
- Place of birth: Yenimahalle, Ankara, Turkey
- Height: 1.80 m (5 ft 11 in)
- Position: Midfielder

Team information
- Current team: Kırşehir Futbol SK
- Number: 8

Youth career
- 2006: Antalya Yolspor
- 2006–2010: Antalyaspor
- 2010–2011: Antalya Yolspor
- 2011–2012: Kayseri Erciyesspor
- 2012–2016: Kayserispor

Senior career*
Years	Team	Apps	(Gls)
2016–2019	Kayserispor	12	(0)
2017	→ Etimesgut Belediyespor (loan)	5	(0)
2017–2018	→ Bayburt Özel İdarespor (loan)	35	(0)
2019	Vanspor FK	7	(0)
2020	Bayburt Özel İdarespor	10	(1)
2020–2021	Turgutluspor	18	(0)
2021–2022	Akhisarspor	48	(0)
2022–2023	Nazilli Belediyespor	34	(1)
2023–	Kırşehir Futbol SK	5	(0)
- * Club domestic league appearances and goals as of 24 September 2023

Mert Özyıldırım (born 28 February 1995) is a Turkish footballer who plays as midfielder for TFF Second League club Kırşehir Futbol SK. He can also play as a center-back.

== Career ==
Mert made his senior debut with Kayserispor in a 2-0 loss to Akhisar Belediyespor on 21 August 2016.
