= Yeşilova S.K. =

Turkish football club

Yeşilova
- Full name: Yeşilova Spor Kulübü
- Founded: 1954
- Ground: Yusuf Tırpancı Stadium
- Capacity: 1,000
- League: Turkish Regional Amateur League
- 2013–2014: 2.(promoted)
Home colours	Away colours

Yeşilova is a Turkish football club located in the city of İzmir in Turkey. Formed in 1954. The club colours are green, white and brown and they play their home matches at Yusuf Tırpancı Stadium.

Yeşilova is the most successful club of Bornova district of İzmir. Bornova is known as the first place in Turkey where football first was played. Yeşilova represented İzmir in second and third divisions of Turkish leagues for many years. However, they play in amateur leagues since 1997.

== League participations ==
- TFF Second League

1980–1983,

- TFF Third League

1970–1980, 1983–1997, 1998–1999

- Turkish Regional Amateur League

2012–2013, 2014–

- İzmir Amateur Leagues

1954–1970, 1997–1998, 1999–2012, 2013–2014
