= New Turgutlu Stadium =

Stadium in Turgutlu, Turkey

Coordinates: 38°29′53″N 27°41′23″E

- Interactive map of New Turgutlu Stadium
- Location: Turgutlu, Turkey
- Operator: Turgutluspor
- Capacity: 10,000

Construction
- Groundbreaking: June 1, 2011
- Opened: 2023

New Turgutlu Stadium is a stadium in Turgutlu, Turkey. It has a capacity of 10,000 spectators and is the new home of Turgutluspor of the TFF Third League. It replaced the club's old home, 7 Eylül Stadium.
