= Sürmenespor =

Turkish football club

- Full name: Sürmenespor Kulübü
- Nicknames: Green and White
- Founded: 13 July 1967
- Ground: İsmet Gürbüz Civelek Stadium, Sürmene, Trabzon
- Capacity: 1,165
- Chairman: Mustafa Keser
- Manager: Erol Batur
- League: Trabzon Amateur League
Home colours	Away colours

Sürmenespor, is the football team of Sürmene near Trabzon, Turkey. The club was founded at 13 July 1967 and played in the TFF Third League 1999–2000 and 2006–2010.

== Kits ==
The clubs plays in green and white kits.

== Stadium ==
Currently the team plays at the 1165 capacity İsmet Gürbüz Civelek Stadium.

== League participations ==
- TFF Third League: 1999–2000, 2006–2010
- Turkish Regional Amateur League: 2010–2011
- Trabzon Amateur League: 1967–1999, 2011–
