= Ünye İlçe Stadium =

Multi-purpose stadium in Turkey

- Interactive map of Ünye İlçe Stadium
- Location: Ünye, Ordu
- Coordinates: 41°07′29″N 37°17′08″E
- Capacity: 10,340
- Surface: Turf

Tenant
- Ünyespor

Ünye İlçe Stadium is a multi-purpose stadium in Ünye, Turkey. It is currently used mostly for football matches and is the home ground of Ünyespor.

The stadium currently holds 10,340 people.
