= Elazığ Atatürk Stadium =

Stadium located in Elazığ, Turkiye

Coordinates: 38°40′16″N 39°11′52″E

- Interactive map of Elazığ Atatürk Stadium
- Full name: Elazığ Atatürk Stadyumu
- Location: Elazığ, Turkey
- Capacity: 18,423
- Surface: Grass

Construction
- Opened: 1974, 2023
- Demolished: 2019

Tenants
- Elazığspor; Turkey women's national football team (selected matches)

Elazığ Atatürk Stadium is a multi-purpose stadium located in Elazığ, Turkey. The stadium originally opened in 1974, it served as the home ground for the football club Elazığspor for many years. The stadium underwent major renovations and was completely rebuilt between 2019 and 2023, featuring a modernized structure that meets contemporary requirements and complies with UEFA standards for hosting international football matches.

The stadium, constructed by the Ministry of Youth and Sports on a 52-decare area in the city center, features a library and multipurpose spaces that accommodate various sports such as weightlifting, billiards, stationary cycling, taekwondo, boxing, wrestling, badminton, air rifle shooting, basketball, and volleyball. Additionally, the complex includes a 2,650-seat indoor sports hall, an administrative building, and open and closed parking areas with a capacity of 480 vehicles.

The new stadium was inaugurated in 2023 with a seating capacity of 18,423 spectators. It features upgraded facilities including VIP lounges, press areas, and modern locker rooms, making it suitable for both national and international sports events.

The first international match played at the new stadium was a UEFA Women's Nations League game between Turkey and Lithuania on 26 September 2023, which ended in a 2–0 victory for Turkey.

== Matches ==
=== Turkish Women's National Team ===
Date	Time (CEST)	Team #1	Res.	Team #2	Round	Attendance
26 September 2023	17:00	Turkey	2–0	Lithuania	2023–24 UEFA Women's Nations League	6,700

== See also ==
- Lists of stadiums
- List of football stadiums in Turkey
