= Trabzon Telekomspor =

Turkish football club

Telekomspor
- Full name: Trabzon Telekomspor
- Founded: 1979
- Ground: Yavuz Selim Stadyumu, Trabzon
- Capacity: 1,800
- Chairman: Isa Omur
- League: Amatör Futbol Ligleri
Home colours	Away colours

Trabzon Telekomspor is a football club in located in Trabzon, Turkey.

The club plays in the Amatör Futbol Ligleri.

== Stadium ==
Currently the team plays at the 1800 capacity Yavuz Selim Stadyumu.

== Kits ==
Trabzon Telekomspor plays in white and light-blue kits.

== League participations ==
- TFF Third League: 1989–2003
- Turkish Regional Amateur League: 2003–?
