= 5 Temmuz İskenderunspor =

İskenderun Belediye Gençlik ve Spor
- Ground: Unknown, Hatay
- Capacity: Unknown
- League: Hatay Amateur Leagues
| Home colours | Away colours |

İskenderun Belediye Gençlik ve Spor is a football club located in İskenderun in Hatay, southern Turkey. The team competes in Hatay Amateur Leagues.

== Previous names ==
- Kanatlıspor (??–??)
- Hatay Köy Hizmetlerispor (??–2005)
- Antakyaspor (2005–2008)
- İskenderun Belediye Sahil Spor (2008–2009)
- Karayılan Belediyespor (2009–2014)
- İskenderun Belediye Gençlik ve Spor (2014–2019)
- 5 Temmuz İskenderunspor (2019–present)

== League participations ==
- TFF Third League: 2004–2008
- Hatay Amateur Leagues: 2008–present

== League performances ==
| Season | League | Pos | Pld | W | D | L | PF | PA | Pts |
|---|---|---|---|---|---|---|---|---|---|
| 2004–05 | TFF Third League – 1st Group | 5 | 30 | 13 | 9 | 8 | 52 | 38 | 48 |
| 2005–06 | TFF Third League – 1st Group | 11 | 30 | 9 | 8 | 13 | 38 | 38 | 35 |
| 2006–07 | TFF Third League – 1st Group | 14 | 30 | 6 | 8 | 16 | 25 | 46 | 26 |
| 2007–08 | TFF Third League – 1st Group | 13 | 30 | 9 | 9 | 12 | 31 | 35 | 36 |

| Promotion |
| Relegation |
