= İskenderunspor =

- Full name: İskenderunspor
- Founded: 1967
- Dissolved: 2006

İskenderunspor is a defunct sports club based in İskenderun, Turkey. In 2009 a phoenix club called İskenderunspor 1967 was founded continuing its traditions. Another club İskenderun FK was renamed to İskenderunspor in 2021.

== Stadium ==
The team used to play at the 12400 capacity 5 Temmuz Stadium.

== League participations ==
- TFF First League: 1971–1978, 1980–1990, 1991–1993, 1996–1997
- TFF Second League: 1967–1971, 1978–1979, 1990–1991, 1993–1996, 1997–2001
- TFF Third League: 2001–2002
- Hatay Amateur Leagues: 1979–1980, 2002–2006
