= Ay-Yıldız Stadium =

Football stadium in Karabük, Turkey

Coordinates: 41°12′19″N 32°39′24″E

- Interactive map of Ay-Yıldız Stadium
- Location: Karabük, Turkey
- Operator: Karabük University
- Capacity: 25,000

Construction
- Groundbreaking: June 1, 2011
- Opened: 2014

Ay-Yıldız Stadium is a stadium in Karabük, Turkey. It was opened to public in 2014 and have a capacity of 25,000 spectators. This stadium's unique feature is when looked from a bird's eye view, the stadium will have the shape of a crescent moon and a star, as in Turkish flag. It is the new home of Karabük University. The dean of the university stated that Karabukspor is welcome in their stadium.
