= Arsuz Karaağaçspor =

- Full name: Arsuz Karaağaçspor
- Founded: 2009
- Ground: 5 Temmuz Stadium, İskenderun
- Capacity: 12400
- Chairman: Sedat Uysal
- Manager: Can Güven
- League: Hatay Amateur Leagues
- 2014–15: TBD
Home colours	Away colours

Arsuz Karaağaçspor is a Turkish sports club from İskenderun, in southern Turkey.

The clubs plays in orange and blue kits, and have done so since their formation in 2009. The club is a phoenix club of İskenderunspor which folded in 2006.

In 2019–2020 season, Arsuz Karaağaçspor compete in the Hatay Amateur Leagues.

== Previous names ==
- Yeni İskenderunspor (2009–2011)
- İskenderunspor 1967 (2011–2012)
- Arsuz Karaağaçspor (2012–present)

== League participations ==
- TFF Third League: 2010–2013
- Turkish Regional Amateur League: 2013–2014, 2016–2019
- Hatay Amateur Leagues: 2009–2010, 2014–2016, 2019–present

== League performances ==
Season	League	Pos	Pld	W	D	L	PF	PA	Pts
2010–11	TFF Third League – 2nd Group	10	34	12	12	10	39	31	48
2011–12	TFF Third League – 2nd Group	11	36	11	10	15	47	58	43
2012–13	TFF Third League – 2nd Group	17	34	7	6	21	37	72	27
2013–14^{^}	Turkish Regional Amateur League – 3rd Group	15	28	0	0	28	0	84	−3
2016–17	Turkish Regional Amateur League – 5th Group	11	24	5	4	15	24	45	19
	Turkish Regional Amateur League Play-out	Winner	1	1	0	0	1	0	3
2017–18	Turkish Regional Amateur League								

Notes:
^ The team withdrew from the competition in 2013–14

Promotion
Relegation

Source: TFF: İskenderunspor 1967
