= 1920 Maraşspor =

Turkish football club

- Full name: 1920 Maraş Spor Kulübü
- Founded: 1976
- Dissolved: 2019
- Ground: 12 Şubat Stadium, Kahramanmaraş
- Chairman: Cemal Tanrıverdi
- Manager: Tayfun Şirin
- League: TFF Third League
- 2014–15: TBD
Home colours	Away colours

1920 Maraşspor, formerly Kahramanmaraş Büyükşehir Belediyespor, was a football club located in Kahramanmaraş, Turkey. The team competes in TFF Third League, having been promoted in the 2011–12 season.

== Previous names ==
- Kahramanmaraş Belediyespor (1976–2012)
- Kahramanmaraş Büyükşehir Belediyespor (2012–2016)
- 1920 Maraşspor (2012–2019)

== League participation ==
- TFF Third League: 2012–2019
- Turkish Regional Amateur League: 2010–2012

== Stadium ==
The club plays at 12 Şubat Stadium.
