= Antalya Kemerspor =

Turkish football club

- Full name: Antalya Kemerspor Kulübü
- Founded: 2003
- Ground: Dr. Fehmi Öncel Stadium, Antalya
- Capacity: 2,000
- Chairman: İsmail Selami Minta
- Manager: Osman Akyol
- 2018–19: TFF Third League, Group 2, 12th
Home colours	Away colours

Antalya Kemerspor, formerly Kemer Tekirovaspor, Kemerspor 2003, is a football club located in Antalya, Turkey. Kemerspor 2003 promoted to the TFF Third League after the 2008–09 season.

== Previous names ==
- Tekirova Belediyespor (2003–2014)
- Kemer Tekirovaspor (2014–2015)
- Kemerspor 2003 (2015–2018)
- Antalya Kemerspor (2018–present)

== League participations ==
- TFF Third League: 2009–present

== Stadium ==
Currently the team plays at the 2,000-capacity Dr. Fehmi Öncel Stadium.
