= Sivas Belediyespor =

Turkish football club

- Full name: Sivas Belediyespor
- Founded: 1995
- Ground: Muhsin Yazıcıoğlu Stadium, Sivas
- Capacity: 3,200
- Chairman: Turhan Tunahan
- Manager: Özer Karadaş
- Website: http://sivasbelediyespor.com/
Home colours	Away colours	Third colours

Sivas Dört Eylül Belediye Spor is a Turkish professional football club located in Sivas. The team currently plays in the TFF Second League. The club was promoted to the TFF Third League after the 2009–10 season. They finally were promoted to the TFF Second League after winning the promotion play-offs in the 2014–15 season. They have also a volleyball team and played in Turkish Men's Volleyball League between 2011 and 2013.

== Previous names ==
- Sivas Dört Eylül Belediyespor (1995–2015)
- Sivas Belediyespor (2015–present)

== League participations ==
- TFF Second League: 2015–present
- TFF Third League: 2010–2015

== Stadium ==
Currently the team plays at the 3,200-seat capacity Muhsin Yazıcıoğlu Stadium.

== Current squad ==
As of 14 January 2023

Note: Flags indicate national team as defined under FIFA eligibility rules; some limited exceptions apply. Players may hold more than one non-FIFA nationality.

No.	Pos.	Nation	Player
4	DF	TUR	Gökhan Çetinus
5	DF	TUR	Uğur Bulut
6	MF	TUR	Semih Kahraman
7	FW	TUR	Emre Adiloğlu
9	FW	TUR	Oğuzhan Bozkurt
10	MF	TUR	Ozan Kılıçoğlu
11	DF	TUR	Halil Mızrap
14	MF	TUR	Berkay Yıldız
18	MF	GER	Furkan Sağman (on loan from Sivasspor)
19	DF	TUR	Ömer İnan
22	FW	TUR	Tarık Kurt
23	DF	TUR	Egemen Zengin
25	DF	TUR	Tufan Kelleci

No.	Pos.	Nation	Player
29	GK	TUR	Taha Cengiz Demirtaş
34	GK	TUR	Emre Çiğdem
41	MF	TUR	Ahmet Özer
54	FW	TUR	Seymen Salih Adalı (on loan from Tuzlaspor)
58	FW	GER	Rahmi Can Baş
70	FW	TUR	Emre Bayram
77	FW	TUR	Burak Özdemir
78	DF	TUR	Arda Belen (on loan from İstanbulspor)
88	FW	TUR	Barış Bozdilki
93	DF	TUR	Safa Yıldırım
97	FW	TUR	Arda Keser (on loan from Sivasspor)
—	DF	TUR	Fatih Ayık

=== Other players under contract ===
Note: Flags indicate national team as defined under FIFA eligibility rules; some limited exceptions apply. Players may hold more than one non-FIFA nationality.

No.	Pos.	Nation	Player
—	DF	TUR	Enes Kodaz
