= Haçka SK =

Turkish sports club

- Full name: Haçka Spor Kulübü
- Founded: 1980
- Ground: Akçaabat Fatih Stadium, Trabzon
- Capacity: 6,300
- Chairman: Muhammed Engin Kara
- Manager: Osman Kastan
Home colours	Away colours

Haçka SK, formerly Trabzon Akçaabat FK, is a sports club located in Akçaabat near Trabzon, Turkey. The football club plays in white and blue kits, and have done so since their formation in 1980.

== Stadium ==
Currently the team plays at the 6,300 capacity Akçaabat Fatih Stadium.

== League participations ==
- TFF Third League: 1987–1997, 2009–2015
- Turkish Regional Amateur League: 2015–2016
- Super Amateur Leagues: 1980–1987, 1997–2009, 2016–present

== Former name ==
- 1980–2012 Yalıspor
- 2012–2013 Trabzon Kanuni FK
- 2013–2015 Trabzon Akçaabat FK
- 2015–2016 Trabzon Kanuni FK
- 2016– Haçka SK
