= Arsinspor =

Turkish sports club

- Full name: Arsinspor
- Founded: 1973; 53 years ago
- Ground: Arsin İlçe Stadium, Trabzon
- Capacity: 1,250 all covered
- Chairman: Paşa Koç
- Manager: Orhan Cinemre
- League: Regional Amateur League
- 2009–2010: TFF 3. Lig, 8th
Home colours	Away colours

Arsinspor is a sports club located in Trabzon, Turkey. The football club plays in the Regional Amateur League.

== Current squad ==
Note: Flags indicate national team as defined under FIFA eligibility rules; some limited exceptions apply. Players may hold more than one non-FIFA nationality.

No.	Pos.	Nation	Player
83	GK	TUR	Ercan Ezgi
12	GK	TUR	Hakan Türüt
90	GK	TUR	İlyas Can Coşkun
25	DF	TUR	Ahmet Özkal
53	DF	TUR	Adem Kaba
5	DF	TUR	Mikail Üzümcü
99	DF	TUR	Barış Büyükkara
21	DF	TUR	Yiğit Kabasoğlu
57	DF	TUR	Cem Şahinkaya
93	MF	TUR	Caner İlyas
85	MF	SYR	Yaser Akra
3	MF	TUR	Miraç Çakmak

No.	Pos.	Nation	Player
7	MF	SYR	Abdul Razzak Omar
8	MF	TUR	Toygar Aydın
88	MF	TUR	Ahmet Şahin
15	MF	TUR	Burak Akyol
18	MF	TUR	Selahattin Can Ustaömer
15	MF	TUR	Burak Akyol
10	FW	TUR	Onur Osman Erel
28	FW	TUR	Mustafa Burak Karayar
9	FW	TUR	Mahmut Bektaş

Starred players have Turkish citizenship also.
