= Kayseri Şekerspor =

- Full name: Kayseri Şeker Spor Kulübü
- Founded: 1986
- Ground: Vali Nihat Canpolat Sümer Sports Complex, Kayseri
- Capacity: 500
- Coordinates: 38°45′02″N 35°24′28″E
- Chairman: Volkan Erişen
- Manager: Uğur Kulaksız
- League: Professional Transition League
- 2025–26: Kayseri Super Amateur League, 1st of 14 (promoted)
Home colours	Away colours

Kayseri Şekerspor is a sports club located in Kayseri, Turkey. The club has a football and wrestling branch.

== History ==
Kayseri Şekerspor was founded in 1986. The club has its origins in the Turkey Sugar Factories Inc. One of the factories is in Kayseri, producing sugar from sugar beet. The Turkey Sugar Factories logo was also incorporated in the club's logos.

Turkey Sugar Factories logo

Kayseri Şekerspor promoted to the TFF Third League after the 2011–12 season. After three seasons the club relegated to the Turkish Regional Amateur League, finishing as 17th in the 3rd group of the TFF Third League. Kayseri Şekerspor opted out to take part in the Turkish Regional Amateur League 2018-19 season. The club competed since the 2018–19 season in the Kayseri Super Amateur League until the 2025–26 season. That season the club was crowned champions, earning promotion to the Professional Transition League (formerly known as Turkish Regional Amateur League).

== Wrestling ==
On 14 August 2026 honorary chairman Hüseyin Akay opened together with President Taha Akgül of the Turkish Wrestling Federation the club's new wrestling sports hall. Built with a balloon system it offers a comprehensive working environment for athletes with six wrestling mats, a fully equipped weight training center, a fitness center and large training areas.

== Stadium ==
Currently the team plays at Vali Nihat Canpolat Sümer Sports Complex. Which has a capacity for 500 spectators.

== League participations ==
- TFF Third League: 2012–2015
- Turkish Regional Amateur League: 2010–2012, 2015–2018, 2026–
- Amateurs: 1986–2010, 2018–2026
