= Elazığ Belediyespor =

Turkish sports club

Elazığ Bld
- Full name: Elazığ Belediyespor
- Founded: 1989
- Dissolved: 2014
- Ground: Elazığ Atatürk Stadium, Elazığ
- Capacity: 14000
- President: Serkan Güllü
- Co-chairmen: Önder Çınar
- League: TFF Third League
- Website: http://www.elazig.bel.tr/
Home colours	Away colours

Elazığ Belediyespor was a Turkish sports club from Elazığ, Turkey.

The club played in blue and black kits, and did so since their formation in 1989.

== Stadium ==
The team played at the 14,000-seat capacity Elazığ Atatürk Stadium.

== League participations ==
- TFF Third League: 1997–2002, 2011–2014
- Turkish Regional Amateur League: 1989–1997, 2002–2011
