= Çankırıspor =

Association football club

- Full name: Çankırıspor
- Founded: 1993
- Ground: Çankırı Atatürk Stadium, Çankırı
- Capacity: 4410
- Chairman: Sevda Karaali Şireci
- Manager: Sezai Yıldırım
- 2009–10: TFF Second League, 5th
Home colours	Away colours

Çankırıspor is a sports club located in Çankırı, Turkey.

== Gallery ==
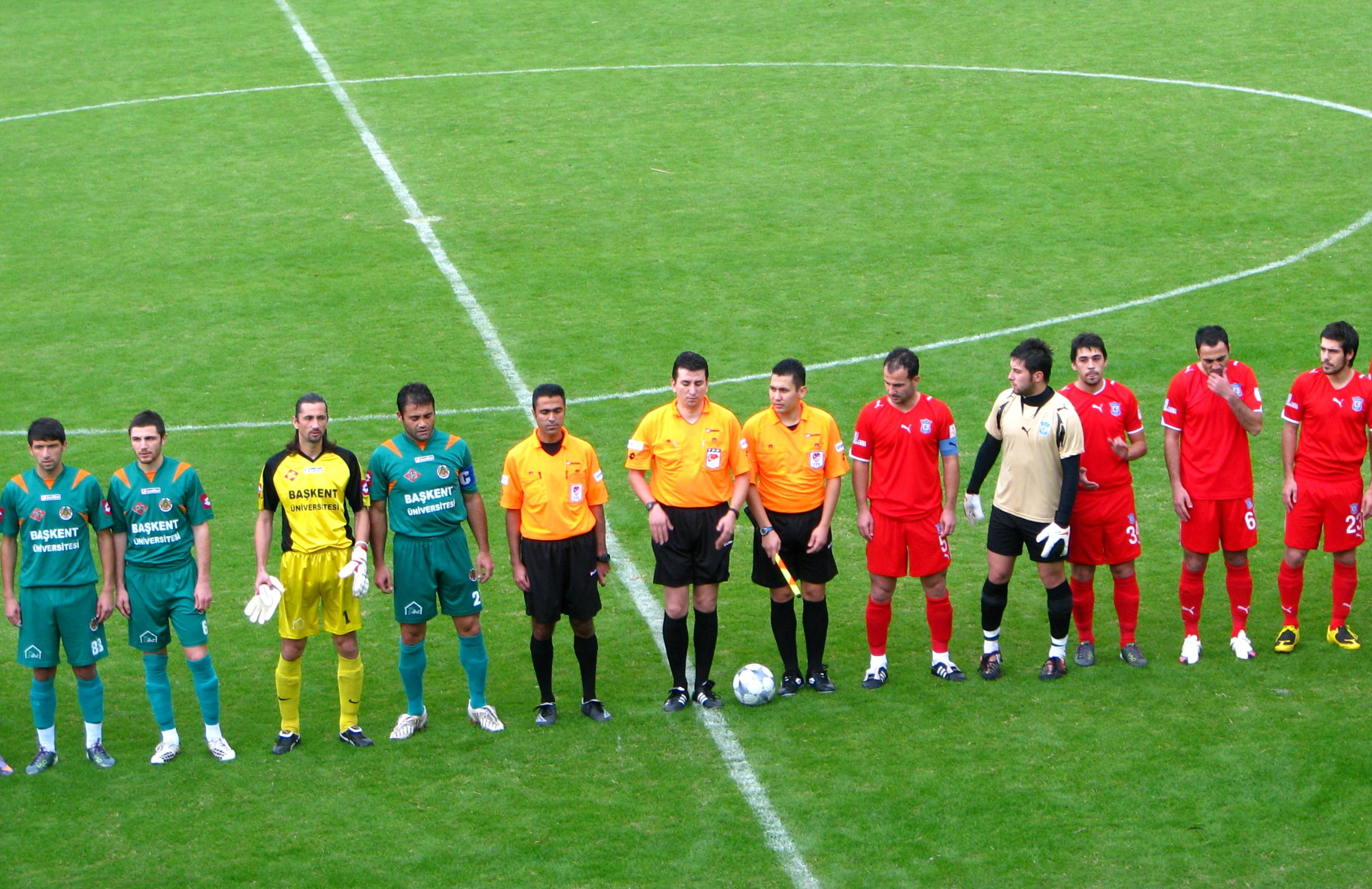
Match between Alanyaspor and Çankırıspor on 19 December 2010
