= Sandıklıspor =

Turkish football club

- Full name: Sandıklıspor
- Founded: 1986
- Ground: Sandıklı İlçe Stadium, Sandıklı, Afyonkarahisar
- Capacity: 2.500
- Chairman: Emre İleri
- Manager: Kadir Özdayı
- League: Turkish Regional Amateur League
Home colours	Away colours

Sandıklıspor, formerly known as Sandıklı Belediyespor, is a football club located in Afyonkarahisar, Turkey. The club colors are red and purple.

== League participations ==
- TFF 2. Lig (Türkiye 3. Futbol Ligi): 1986–1992
- TFF 3. Lig: 2011–2016
- Turkish Regional Amateur League: 2010–2011, 2016–2023, 2024–
- Amateur Leagues: 1992–2010, 2023–2024

== Stadium ==
Currently the team plays at the 2.500 capacity Sandıklı İlçe Stadium.
