= Nazilli Belediyespor =

Association football club

- Full name: Nazilli Belediye Spor Kulübü
- Nickname: Naz Naz
- Founded: 1984
- Ground: Nazilli İlçe Stadium, Nazilli
- Capacity: 4,500
- Chairman: Soner Yelkovan
- Manager: Kadir Kar
- Website: http://www.nazillibelediyespor.org/
Home colours	Away colours

Nazilli Belediyespor is the local football team for city of Nazilli in Turkey. They are currently playing in the TFF Second League.

== History ==
Nazilli Belediyespor was founded in 1984. At the beginning, the club's kit colours were yellow and navy blue, but due to request of supporters in the city, colours changed as white and black. The team strolled between TFF Second and Third Leagues for years.

== Rivals ==
The club has Aydınspor as a local rival.

== Current squad ==
As of 20 January 2023

Note: Flags indicate national team as defined under FIFA eligibility rules; some limited exceptions apply. Players may hold more than one non-FIFA nationality.

No.	Pos.	Nation	Player
1	GK	TUR	Canberk Aydemir
2	DF	TUR	Tuncay Çağman (on loan from Altınordu)
4	MF	TUR	Mehmet Ersavaş
6	MF	TUR	Çağrı Bülbül
8	MF	TUR	Mert Özyıldırım
9	FW	TUR	Ahmet Gökbayrak
10	FW	TUR	Gökhan Göksu
11	FW	BEL	Ahmet Karadayi
14	MF	TUR	Cemal Şener
15	DF	TUR	Nuh Aşkın
16	DF	TUR	Mert Estik
17	FW	TUR	Şükrü Kaan Kılıçaslan
18	DF	TUR	Ekin Karakuyu
20	MF	TUR	Nurettin Çağlar

No.	Pos.	Nation	Player
22	FW	TUR	Alim Harlak
23	MF	TUR	Furkan Apaydın
26	DF	TUR	Emre Toptan
28	DF	TUR	Bilal Ceylan (on loan from Beşiktaş)
30	MF	TUR	Abdullah Kayalık
34	GK	TUR	Hasan Çayrak
48	DF	TUR	Hakkı Can Aksu
74	DF	TUR	Doğukan Nelik (on loan from Antalyaspor)
77	FW	TUR	Yılmaz Basravi (on loan from Göztepe)
90	FW	TUR	Hüseyin Çolak
92	GK	TUR	Zekeriya Topayan
93	FW	TUR	Fatih Üge
99	FW	TUR	Anıl Arıcıoğlu (on loan from Altınordu)
—	FW	TUR	Ahmet Aygün
