= Adıyamanspor =

Turkish football club

- Full name: Adıyamanspor
- Nickname: Yaman
- Founded: 1946
- Ground: Adıyaman Atatürk Stadium, Adıyaman
- Capacity: 8,596
- Chairman: Nöyfel Bozdoğan
- Manager: İlker Yanar
- League: Adıyaman 1. Amateur League
Home colours	Away colours

Adıyamanspor is a sports club located in Adıyaman, Turkey.

== History ==
Adıyamaspor were founded as Adıyaman Gençlikspor in 1946. They joined the professional leagues firstly 1983–84 in the TFF Third League. In 1992–93, they promoted for the TFF Second League, where they competed until 1999–2000. In 2001–02, the regained promotion to the TFF Second League until 2011–12. After two seasons in the TFF Third League, they relegated to the Regional Amateur League. In the 2014–15 season, they lost 2–1 in a play-off match against Adıyaman FK to be relegated from the Regional Amateur League, followed by relegations to the Adıyaman 1st and 2nd Amateur Leagues. Later on, they gained two promotions in 2017–18 and 2021–22 back to the Regional Amateur League. However, they decided to withdraw from the league after the second week of the 2022–23 season.

== Honours ==
- TFF Third League
  - Winners: 1992–93, 2001–02
- Turkish Regional Amateur League
  - Winners: 2017–18
- Adıyaman 1st Amateur League:
  - Winners: 2021–22
- Adıyaman 2nd Amateur League:
  - Winners: 2017–18
