= TFF 3. Lig =

- Organising body: Turkish Football Federation (TFF)
- Founded: 1967; 56 years ago
- Country: Turkey
- Confederation: UEFA
- Number of clubs: 64
- Level on pyramid: 4
- Promotion to: 2. Lig
- Relegation to: Professional Transition League
- Domestic cup: Turkish Cup
- Current champions: Bursaspor (Group 1); Muğlaspor (Group 2); Aliağa FK (Group 3); Mardin 1969 SK (Group 4)
- Broadcasters: Turkish Football Federation Youtube channel and local TV-stations
- Website: 3. Lig
- Current: 2025–26 TFF Third League

The TFF 3. Lig (lit. 'TFF 3rd League'), currently referred to as Nesine 3. Lig for sponsorship reasons, is the fourth level in the Turkish football league system. It was founded in the 2001–02 season as a continuation of then third level division Turkish Third Football League. (Note: Turkish Third Football League (in Turkish: Türkiye Üçüncü Futbol Ligi or shortly Üçüncü Lig or 3. Lig) is a defunct football league in Turkey. It was the third level division in Turkish football since its foundation in 1967–68 until the formation of the new league system in 2001-02. The Turkish Third Football League continued as TFF Third League in the new league system after 2001, but this time as the fourth layer. The third level of Turkish League was initially renamed as TFF Second League Category A, later TFF Second League. A comparison of new and old league systems can be seen in "see also" section of this article.)

== League format ==
The league is played with 64 teams in four groups. The winners of each group are directly promoted to TFF Second League. In each group the 2nd placed teams through 6th placed teams play promotion play-offs to determine the last two teams to be promoted. Each runner-up placed team of every group will play in the play-off 3rd round. The numbers 3 and 6 and the numbers 4 and numbers 5 will compete in the 1st round in a single match against each other, the numbers 3 and 4 having the home advantage. In the 2nd round the winners of the 1st round will compete against each other in a home and away game. The higher ranked clubs in the league have the home advantage in the second game. In the 3rd round the winners of the second round will play against the league runner-ups in a home and away match, the latter having the home advantage. The play-off finals will be between the winners of the 3rd round in group I versus II and between group III versus IV. The bottom three teams in each group are relegated to Turkish Regional Amateur League.

== Seasons ==
=== 1967–68 season ===
League was founded in 1967–68. In the first year 17 teams competed. Two teams relegated from Turkish Second Football League: Beyoğluspor, Davutpaşa. Tekirdağspor, Çanakkalespor, Çorumspor, Elazığspor, Muğlaspor, Düzcespor, Eskişehir Demirspor, Kırıkkalespor, Nazillispor (founded in 1967 and dissolved in 1975), Konya İdman Yurdu, Tarsus İdman Yurdu, Ceyhanspor, Lüleburgazspor, Tekirdağspor, İskenderunspor, and Hatayspor were other teams whose applications were accepted by TFF. At the end of the season winner promoted to TFF Second League, no team relegated.

Promotion and relegation:

Season	Promoted to Turkish Second Football League	Relegated to Amatör Futbol Ligleri
1967–68	Düzcespor	no relegation

Promotion from amateur leagues:

Season	Promoted to Turkish Third Football League
1967–68	Tekirdağspor, Çanakkalespor, Çorumspor, Elazığspor, Muğlaspor, Düzcespor, Eskişehir Demirspor, Kırıkkalespor, Nazillispor, Konya İdman Yurdu, Tarsus İdman Yurdu, Ceyhanspor, Lüleburgazspor, İskenderunspor, Hatayspor.

=== 1968–69 season ===
In 1968–69 new clubs joined: Amasyaspor, Burdurspor, Diyarbakırspor, Ispartaspor, Rizespor, Ankara Sanayi Barbaros. Two groups were formed on geographical basis: Red Group for East and White Group for West. Each group contained 14 teams and one best promoted and one worst relegated in each group.

Promotion and relegation:

Season	Promoted to Turkish Second Football League	Relegated to Regional Amateur Leagues
1968–69	White Group: Nazillispor; Red Group: Tarsus İdmanyurdu	White Group: Burdurspor; Red Group: Altındağ

Promotion from amateur leagues:

Season	Promoted to Turkish Third Football League
1968–69	Amasyaspor, Burdurspor, Diyarbakırspor, Ispartaspor, Rizespor, Ankara Sanayi Barbaros (Regional Professional Leagues champs).

=== 1969–70 season ===
Promotion and relegation:

Season	Promoted to Turkish Second Football League	Relegated to Regional Amateur Leagues
1969–70	White Group: Uşakspor; Red Group: Hatayspor	no relegation

Promotion from amateur leagues:

Season	Promoted to Turkish Third Football League
1969–70	Erzincanspor, Erzurumspor, Karabükspor, Kırklarelispor, Kırşehirspor, Konya Ereğlispor, Nevşehirspor, Urfaspor, Mardinspor, Tokatspor, Ankara Yenimahalle (Regional Professional Leagues champs).

=== 1970–71 season ===
Promotion and relegation:

Season	Promoted to Turkish Second Football League	Relegated to Regional Amateur Leagues
1970–71	White Group: Sarıyer; Red Group: Konyaspor; Blue Group: İskenderunspor; Green Group: Konya İdman Yurdu	no relegation

=== 1971–72 season ===
Promotion and relegation:

Season	Promoted to Turkish Second Football League	Relegated to Regional Amateur Leagues
1971-–72	White Group: Beykoz; Red Group: Lüleburgazspor; Blue Group: DÇ Karabükspor; Green Group: Gaziantepspor	White Group: Beylerbeyi, Yeşildirek; Red Group: İstanbul Hasköy, Ülküspor; Blue Group: Bahçeli, Yenişehir; Green Group: Sanayi Barbaros, Altındağ

=== 1972–73 season ===
Promotion and relegation:

Season	Promoted to Turkish Second Football League	Relegated to Regional Amateur Leagues
1972–73	White Group: Tirespor; Red Group: Eskişehir Demirspor; Blue Group: Malatyaspor; Green Group: Erzurumspor	White Group: Eyüpspor, İzmir Demirspor; Red Group: Burdurspor, Muğlaspor; Blue Group: Yenimahalle, Sincanspor; Green Group: Mardinspor, Toprakofisi

=== 1973–74 season ===
Promotion and relegation:

Season	Promoted to Turkish Second Football League	Relegated to Regional Amateur Leagues
1973–74	White Group: Kırıkkalespor (1st), DÇ Karabükspor (2nd); Red Group: Çorumspor (1st), Rizespor (2nd)	White Group: Afyonspor, Güneşspor, Hacettepe, Nazillispor; Red Group: Davutpaşa, Ankara Sitespor, Taksim SK, Yeşildirek

=== 1974–75 season ===
Promotion and relegation:

Season	Promoted to Turkish Second Football League	Relegated to Regional Amateur Leagues
1974–75	White Group: Bandırmaspor; Red Group: Elazığspor	White Group: Petrol Ofisi Spor, Feriköy; Red Group: Kırşehirspor, PTT

=== 1975–76 season ===
Promotion and relegation:

Season	Promoted to Turkish Second Football League	Relegated to Regional Amateur Leagues
1975–76	White Group: Ispartaspor; Red Group: Diyarbakırspor	no relelegation

=== 1976–77 season ===
Promotion and relegation:

Season	Promoted to Turkish Second Football League	Relegated to Regional Amateur Leagues
1976–77	White Group: Tekirdağspor; Red Group: Düzcespor; Blue Group: Urfaspor	White Group: Galata, Anadolu, Süleymaniye; Red Group: Kastamonuspor, Çanakkalespor, Yeşilova; Blue Group: Amasyaspor, Nevşehirspor

=== 1977–78 season ===
Promotion and relegation:

Season	Promoted to Turkish Second Football League	Relegated to Regional Amateur Leagues
1977–78	White Group: Sebat Gençlik; Red Group: Edirnespor	White Group: Kütahyaspor, Alibeyköy Adalet, Hacettepe; Red Group: Ülküspor, Ceyhanspor, Kasımpaşa

=== 1978–79 season ===
Promotion and relegation:

Season	Promoted to Turkish Second Football League	Relegated to Regional Amateur Leagues
1978–79	White Group: Erzurumspor (1st), Giresunspor (2nd); Red Group: Lüleburgazspor (1st), Altınordu (2nd)	White Group: Konya Ereğlispor, İskenderunspor; Red Group: İstanbulspor, Galata, Uşakspor

=== 1979–80 season ===
League was abandoned after the season. All of the teams promoted to 1980-81 Turkish Second Football League

Promotion and relegation:

Season	Promoted to Turkish Second Football League	Relegated to Regional Amateur Leagues
1979–80	Group A: Tarsus İdman Yurdu, Hatayspor, Erzincanspor, Malatyaspor, Konyaspor, Tokatspor, Gençlerbirliği, Çorumspor; Group B: İzmirspor, Karagümrük, Beykoz, Kırklarelispor, Ödemişspor, Kütahyaspor, Manisaspor, Yeşilova, Karşıyaka, Alibeyköy Adalet	No relegation (league was abandoned)

=== 1984–85 season ===
League was not played in 1980–81, 1981–82, 1982–83 and 1983–84 seasons. League was refounded after four seasons.

Promotion and relegation:

Season	Promoted to Turkish Second Football League	Relegated to Regional Amateur Leagues
1984–85	Group 1: Gölcükspor, Group 2: Bakırköyspor, Group 3: İnegölspor, Group 4: Manisaspor, Group 5: Aydınspor, Group 6: Etibank SAS; Group 7: Düzce KDS, Group 8: Osmaniyespor, Group 9: Hopaspor; Group 10: Erzincanspor, Group 11: Siirt YSE Spor	no relegation (league was refounded); Group 3: Bursa Belediyespor withdrew the following season.

=== 1985–86 season ===
Promotion and relegation:

Season	Promoted to Turkish Second Football League	Relegated to Regional Amateur Leagues
1985–86	Group 1: Bayburtspor, Group 2: Elazığspor, Group 3: Reyhanlıspor; Group 4: Çarşambaspor, Group 5: Kırşehirspor, Group 6: Sökespor; Group 7: Kuşadasıspor, Group 8: Sönmez Filamentspor, Group 9: Çanakkalespor; Group 10: Çorluspor, Group 11: Silivrispor, Group 12: Beykoz	no relegation

=== 1986–87 season ===
Promotion and relegation:

Season	Promoted to Turkish Second Football League	Relegated to Regional Amateur Leagues
1986–87	Group 1: Trabzonspor II (1st), Ünyespor (2nd); Group 2: Bitlisspor; Group 3: Niğdespor; Group 4: Bartınspor; Group 5: Ispartaspor; Group 6: Menemenspor; Group 7: Kütahyaspor; Group 8: Uşakspor; Group 9: Eyüpspor; Group 10: Zeytinburnuspor	Group 1: Igdirspor, Palandökenspor; Group 2: Elazığ Ferrokromspor, Van İskelespor; Group 3: İçel Demirspor, Borspor, İskenderun DÇ (withdrawed next season); Group 4: Çankırıspor, Mamakspor; Group 5: Konya Ereğlispor, Y.Çivrilspor, Denizli EŞİY (withdrawed next season); Group 6: Çine Madranspor, Ülküspor; Group 7: Kütahya Termikspor, Bilecikspor; Group 8: Bursa Kültürspor, Karacabeyspor; Group 9: Yeşildirek, Davutpaşa; Group 10: Beyoğluspor, Ümraniyespor

=== 1987–88 season ===
Promotion and relegation:

Season	Promoted to Turkish Second Football League	Relegated to Regional Amateur Leagues
1987–88	Group 1: Giresunspor; Group 2: Mardinspor; Group 3: Nevşehirspor; Group 4: Polatlıspor; Group 5: Alanyaspor; Group 6: Ayvalıkgücü; Group 7: Bursaspor II; Group 8: Uzunköprüspor; Group 9: Kartalspor	Group 1: Karsspor, Gümüşhanespor; Group 2: Pazarcık Aksuspor, Diyarbakır Yolspor; Group 3: Afşinspor, Malatya İdman Yurdu; Group 4: Yeni Bahçelispor; Group 5: Karamanspor, Antalya Yolspor; Group 6: Alaşehirspor; Group 7: Erdekdpor, Eskişehir Demirspor; Group 8: Tekirdağ Sarayspor, Hayraboluspor; Group 9: Kocaeli BŞB Kağıtspor, Taksim SK

=== 1988–89 season ===
Promotion and relegation:

Season	Promoted to Turkish Second Football League	Relegated to Regional Amateur Leagues
1988–89	Group 1: Bulancakspor; Group 2: Şanlıurfaspor; Group 3: Niğdespor; Group 4: Hacettepe Yeni Camuzoğlu; Group 5: Sökespor; Group 6: İzmirspor; Group 7: Bandırmaspor; Group 8: Kasımpaşa; Group 9: Fatih Karagümrük	Group 1: Erbaaspor, Sinopspor; Group 2: Viranşehirspor; Group 3: Kırıkhanspor, Ceyhanspor; Group 4: Kırşehirspor, Kamanspor; Group 5: Burdurspor, Ödemişspor; Group 6: Yeni Bornovaspor, Kemalpaşaspor; Group 7: Keşanspor, Bilecikspor; Group 8: Alibeyköy, Yedikule; Group 9: İstanbul DSİspor, Çengelköy Talimhanespor

=== 1989–90 season ===
TFF declared no relegation but announced that professional clubs will be represented only one team in all professional leagues.

Promotion and relegation:

Season	Promoted to Turkish Second Football League	Relegated to Regional Amateur Leagues
1989–90	Group 1: Ünyespor; Group 2: Elazığspor; Group 3: Hatayspor; Group 4: Düzce Kervan Doğsanspor; Group 5: Yeni Afyonspor; Group 6: Bucaspor; Group 7: Gönenspor; Group 8: Gaziosmanpaşaspor; Group 9: Yalovaspor	Group 1: Trabzonspor II (by TFF decision); Group 4: Aras Sitespor (withdrawed next season); Group 6: Karşıyaka II (by TFF decision); Group 7: Tekirdağ Büyük Salatspor (withdrawed during season); Group 8: Galatasaray II (by TFF decision)

=== 1990–91 season ===
Promotion and relegation:

Season	Promoted to Turkish Second Football League	Relegated to Regional Amateur Leagues
1990–91	Group 1: Bafraspor; Group 2: Muşspor; Group 3: Tarsus İdmanyurdu; Group 4: Kayserispor; Group 5: Ispartaspor; Group 6: Manisaspor; Group 7: Bozüyükspor; Group 8: Süleymaniye Küçükçekmecespor; Group 9: Üsküdar Anadolu	Group 1: Görelespor; Group 2: Iğdırspor; Group 3: Afşinspor; Group 4: Sivas Demirspor; Group 5: Sarayköyspor; Group 6: Menemenspor; Group 7: İznikspor; Group 8: Erdekspor; Group 9: Kocaeli Petkimspor

=== 1991–92 season ===
Promotion and relegation:

Season	Promoted to Turkish Second Football League	Relegated to Regional Amateur Leagues
1991–92	Group 1: Akçaabat Sebatspor; Group 2: Batman Belediyespor; Group 3: İskenderunspor; Group 4: Yozgatspor; Group 5: Yeni Nazillispor; Group 6: Kütahyaspor; Group 7: İstanbulspor; Group 8: Zonguldakspor; Group 9: Balıkesirspor	Group 1: Suluovaspor; Group 2: Sarıkamışspor (now Sarıkamış Esnafspor); Group 3: Reyhanlıspor; Group 4: Çankırıspor; Group 5: Sandıklı Belediyespor (now Sandıklıspor); Group 6: Çeşmespor; Group 7: Edremitspor (now Edremit Belediyespor); Group 8: İstanbul THY; Group 9: Adapazarıspor

=== 1992–93 season ===
Promotion and relegation:

Season	Promoted to Turkish Second Football League	Relegated to Regional Amateur Leagues
1992–93	Group 1: Adıyamanspor; Group 2: Giresunspor; Group 3: Hatayspor; Group 4: Yeni Sincanspor; Group 5: Eskişehirspor; Group 6: Çorumspor; Group 7: İstanbul Büyükşehir Belediyespor; Group 8: Çorluspor; Group 9: Çanakkale Dardanelspor; Group 10: Yeni Turgutluspor	Group 1: Silvanspor, Hakkarispor, Tuncelispor (renamed as Yeni Tuncelispor), Tatvanspor; Group 2: Gümüşhane KH, Fatsaspor, Ağrıspor, Ardeşenspor (now Ardeşen Belediyespor); Group 3: Sahilspor (now İskenderun Belediye Sahilspor), Elbistan Belediyespor, Kadirli İY, Adana GB; Group 4: Kırşehirspor, Konya Yolspor, Konya Ereğlispor, Silifkespor; Group 5: Burdurgücü, Buldanspor, Y. Dinarspor, Y. Akşehirspor; Group 6: Amasyaspor, Köy Hïz. Sinopspor, Vezirköprüspor, Turhalspor; Group 7: Pendikspor, Dikilitaş, Galata, Ümraniyespor; Group 8: Bayrampaşaspor, Nişantaşıspor, Yücespor, Kırklarelispor; Group 9: Çanspor, Keşanspor, Burhaniyespor, Akyazıspor; Group 10: Selçuk Efesspor, Tarişsspor, Tirespor, Alaşehirspor

=== 1993–94 season ===
Promotion and relegation:

Season	Promoted to Turkish Second Football League	Relegated to Regional Amateur Leagues
1993–94	Group 1: Batman Belediyespor; Group 2: Çaykur Rizespor; Group 3: İçel Polisgücü; Group 4: Ankara Şekerspor; Group 5: Kemer Belediyespor; Group 6: Erdemir Ereğlispor; Group 7: Edirnespor; Group 8: Düzcespor; Group 9: Yeni Afyonspor; Group 10: Manisaspor	Group 1: Kızıltepespor, Mardinspor; Group 2: Çayelispor, TEK 12 Martspor; Group 3: Kırıkhanspor, Besni Belediyespor; Group 4: Group 5: Group 6: Bafraspor, Çarşamba Beldespor; Group 7: Silivrispor, Feriköyspor; Group 8: Darıca Gençlerbirliği, Vefaspor; Group 9: Karacabeyspor, Mudanyaspor; Group 10: Bigaspor, Akhisarspor

=== 1994–95 season ===
Promotion and relegation:

Season	Promoted to Turkish Second Football League	Relegated to Regional Amateur Leagues
1994–95	Group 1: Elazığspor; Group 2: Erzincanspor; Group 3: Şanlıurfaspor; Group 4: Ankara PTT; Group 5: Beypazarıspor; Group 6: Fethiyespor; Group 7: Yeni Yozgatspor; Group 8: Bergamaspor; Group 9: Lüleburgazspor; Group 10: Anadoluhisarı İdmanyurdu	Group 1: Van DSİ, Erçişspor; Group 2: Group 3: Group 4: Polatlıspor, DHMİ; Group 5: Group 6: Group 7: Denizli Belediyespor, Ödemiş Belediyespor; Group 8: Group 9: Malkaraspor, İstanbul İl Özel İdarespor; Group 10: Kocaeli Petkimspor (Now İlimtepe Futbol), İznikspor

=== 1995–96 season ===
Promotion and relegation:

Season	Promoted to Turkish Second Football League	Relegated to Regional Amateur Leagues
1995–96	Group 1: Bingölspor; Group 2: Hopaspor; Group 3: İskenderunspor 1967; Group 4: Ankara Demirspor; Group 5: Ünyespor; Group 6: Muşlaspor; Group 7: Kuşadasıspor; Group 8: İnegölspor; Group 9: Nişantaşı; Group 10: Beylerbeyi	Group 1: Group 2: Group 3: Group 4: Group 5: Group 6: Group 7: Group 8: Group 9: Group 10:

=== 1996–97 season ===
Promotion and relegation:

Season	Promoted to Turkish Second Football League	Relegated to Regional Amateur Leagues
1996–97	Group 1: Batman Petrolspor; Group 2: Giresunspor; Group 3: Gaziantep Sankospor; Group 4: Boluspor; Group 5: Ankara Büyükşehir Belediyespor; Group 6: Kasımpaşa; Group 7: Marmarisspor; Group 8: İstanbul Büyükşehir Belediyespor	Group 1: Group 2: Group 3: Group 4: Group 5: Group 6: Group 7: Group 8:

=== 1997–98 season ===
Promotion and relegation:

Season	Promoted to Turkish Second Football League	Relegated to Regional Amateur Leagues
1997–98	Group 1: Ağrıspor; Group 2: Gümüşhane Doğanspor, Amasyaspor (play-off); Group 3: Fırat Üniversitesi; Group 4: Kilimli Belediyespor; Group 5: Petrol Ofisi Spor; Group 6: İzmirspor; Group 7: Pendikspor; Group 8: Çorluspor	Group 1: Bitlis Köy Hizmetleri, Muşspor; Group 2: Iğdır Belediyespor, Sivas Demirspor; Group 3: Kozan Belediyespor, Nizip Belediyespor; Group 4: Kozlu Belediyespor, Ankara Köy Hizmetleri; Group 5: Konya Yolspor, Kütahya Seramikspor; Group 6: Yeni Bornovaspor, Sökespor; Group 7: Bozüyükspor, Karamürselspor; Group 8: Dardanel Kepezspor, Keşanspor

=== 1998–99 season ===
Promotion and relegation:

Season	Promoted to Turkish Second Football League	Relegated to Regional Amateur Leagues
1998–99	Group 1: Siirt Köy Hizmetleri YSE Spor; Group 2: Sivasspor; Group 3: Malatya Belediyespor; Group 4: Kırıkkale Belediyespor, Düzcespor (play-off); Group 5: Ankara Asaşspor, Selçuk Üniversitesi (play-off); Group 6: Yeni Nazillispor; Group 7: Darıca Gençlerbirliği; Group 8: Gaziosmanpaşaspor	Group 1: Bitlis Köy Hizmetleri, Erganispor; Group 2: Turhalspor, Ardeşenspor; Group 3: Siverek Belediyespor, Pütürge Belediyespor; Group 4: Beypazarıspor, Bartınspor; Group 5: Eskişehir Demirspor, Afyon Şekerspor; Group 6: İzmir Yeşilova, Gaziemirspor; Group 7: Bursa Kestelspor, Anadoluhisarı İY; Group 8: Küçükçekmecespor, Bigaspor

=== 1999–2000 season ===
Promotion and relegation:

Season	Promoted to Turkish Second Football League	Relegated to Regional Amateur Leagues
1999–00	Group 1: Cizrespor; Group 2: Gümüşhane Doğanspor, Akçaabat Sebat Gençlik (play-off); Group 3: Hacılar Erciyesspor; Group 4: Türk Telekomspor; Group 5: Ispartaspor; Group 6: Yeni Turgutluspor; Group 7: Öz Sahrayıceditspor; Group 8: Kırklarelispor, Güngören Belediyespor (play-off)	Group 1: Diyarbakır Köy Hizmetleri, Bingölspor; Group 2: Fatsaspor, Sürmenespor; Group 3: Fırat Üniversitesi, İslahiyespor; Group 4: Çaycumaspor, Erdemirspor; Group 5: Yeni Anamurspor, Manavgat Belediyespor; Group 6: Simav Eynalspor, Selçuk Efesspor; Group 7: Ümraniyespor, Feriköy SK; Group 8: Vefa SK, Çerkezköy Belediyespor

=== 2000–01 season ===
Promotion and relegation:

Season	Promoted to Turkish Second Football League	Relegated to Regional Amateur Leagues
2000–01	Group 1: Mardinspor, Hakkarispor, Silopi Cudispor; Group 2: Iğdır Belediyespor, Erzincanspor, Trabzon Telekomspor; Group 3: Demirspor, Kahramanmaraşspor, Mezitlispor; Group 4: Tokatspor, Ankara Demirspor, Ankara EGOspor; Group 5: Kütahyaspor, Uşakspor, Alanyaspor; Group 6: Mustafakemalpaşaspor, Marmarisspor, Aliağa Petkim; Group 7: Eyüpspor, Maltepe, Sapancaspor; Group 8: Yıldırım Bosnaspor, Zeytinburnuspor, Küçükköyspor	Group 1: Muşspor, Bismil Birlikspor, Bitlis Özgüzelderespor, Batman Demirspor; Group 2: Karabulak Gençlik, Arsinspor, Termespor, Doğubeyazıtspor; Group 3: Nevşehirspor, İskenderun DÇ, Malatya Belediyespor, Kozan Belediyespor; Group 4: Turhalspor, Akçakocaspor, Altındağ Belediyespor, Etimesgut Belediyespor; Group 5: Sidespor, Seydişehir Eti Alüminyumspor, Kemerspor, Konya Kartalıspor; Group 6: Balıkesirspor, Kuşadasıspor, Yeni Milasspor, Soma Linyitspor; Group 7: İzmit Bekirpaşaspor, Mudurnuspor, Üsküdar Anadolu SK, Nişantaşıspor; Group 8: Geliboluspor, İstanbul Beşyüzevler, Gönenspor, Çanspor

Source: TFF. Turkish-Soccer archives and mackolik.com.

=== 2001–02 season ===
Promotion and relegation:

Season	Promoted to TFF Second League	Relegated to Amateur Leagues
2001–02	Group 1: Çubukspor, Orduspor; Group 2:Şanlıurfa Belediyespor, Adıyamanspor; Group 3: Zonguldakspor Winner, Tarsus İdmanyurdu (runner-up and play-off winner); Group 4: Muğlaspor, Bursa Merinosspor; Group 5: Fatih Karagümrük, Eyüpspor	Group 1: Karadeniz Ereğlispor, Bayburtspor, Askispor, Petrol Ofisi Spor (Withdrew from the league before start of season); Group 2: İskenderunspor 1967, Genç Telekomspor, Yüksekova Cilospor, Elazığ Belediyespor (Withdrew from the league before start of season); Group 3: Seyhan Belediyespor, Kilimli Belediyespor, Saran Keskinspor, Silifkespor (formerly known as İçel Polisgücü and Mersinspor); Group 4: Körfez Belediyespor, Torbalı Belediyespor, Yeni Salihlispor, Ayvalıkgücü; Group 5: Lüleburgazspor, Ayazağaspor, Tepecik Fıratpenspor, Altıntepsi Makelspor

=== 2002–03 season ===
Promotion and relegation:

Season	Promoted to TFF Second League	Relegated to Amateur Leagues
2002–03	Group 1: Osmaniyespor; Group 2: Yeni Kırşehirspor; Group 3: Aksarayspor; Group 4: Yalovaspor; Group 5: Çorluspor	Group 1: Batman Karşıyakaspor, Vanspor, Ağrıspor; Group 2: Trabzon Telekomspor, Çaykurspor, Çarşambaspor; Group 3: Düzcespor, Kayseri Elektrikspor, Mobellaspor; Group 4: Yeni Turgutluspor, Bergama Belediyespor, Dalaman Kağıtspor; Group 5: İzmitspor, Edirnespor, Kırklarelispor

=== 2003–04 season ===
Promotion from amateur leagues:

Promotion and relegation:

Season	Promoted to TFF Second League	Relegated to Amateur Leagues
2003–04	Group 1: Karamanspor; Group 2: Gençlerbirliği Asaşspor (winner), Ünyespor (runner-up and play-off winner); Group 3: Pendikspor; Group 4: Alanyaspor (winner), Oyak Renaultspor (runner-up and play-off winner)	Group 1: Silopi Cudispor, Yozgatspor, Hakkarispor; Group 2: Artvin Hopaspor, Merzifonspor, Murgul Bakırspor; Group 3: Sapancaspor, Tekirdağspor, Eskişehir Şekerspor; Group 4: Orhangazispor, Afyonspor, Kestel Belediyespor

=== 2004–05 season ===
Promotion from amateur leagues: İskenderun DÇ, Nevşehirspor, Hatay Köy Hizmetleri, Arsinspor, Karsspor, Mecidiyeköy, Yeni Burdur Gençlik, Aroma Akseki.

Promotion and relegation:

Season	Promoted to TFF Second League	Relegated to Amateur Leagues
2004–05	Group 1: İDÇ. Genel Müdürlüğüspor; Group 2: Pazarspor (winner), Giresunspor (runner-up and play-off winner); Group 3: Kasımşapa (winner), Boluspor (runner-up and play-off winner); Group 4: Yeni Turgutluspor	Group 1: Muşspor, Niğdespor; Group 2: Sinopspor, Amasyaspor; Group 3: Yeniköy, Bandırmaspor; Group 4: Akşehirspor, Aliağa Petkim

=== 2005–06 season ===
Promotion from amateur leagues: Değirmenderespor, Gazi Belediyespor, Hopaspor, Afyonkarahisarspor, Nilüfer Belediyespor, Konya Şekerspor, Orhangazispor, Küçükçekmecespor.

Promotion and relegation:

Season	Promoted to TFF Second League	Relegated to Amateur Leagues
2005–06	Group 1: Erzincanspor (winner), Gaskispor (runner-up); Group 2: Etimesgut Şekerspor (winner), Arsinspor (runner-up), Tokatspor (play-off winner); Group 3: Keçiörengücü (winner), Fethiyespor (runner-up); Group 4: Gebzespor (winner), Zeytinburnuspor (runner-up)	Group 1: Bitlis Özgüzelderespor, Nevşehirspor; Group 2: Kızılcahamam Belediyespor, Çubukspor; Group 3: Konya Şekerspor, Akseki Aroma; Group 4: Eskispor, Mecidiyeköy

=== 2006–07 season ===
Promotion from amateur leagues: Belediye Vanspor, Bağlum Belediyespor, Sürmenespor, Bozüyükspor, Balıkesirspor, Tepecik Belediyespor, Orhangazi Gençlerbirliği.

Promotion and relegation:

Season	Promoted to TFF Second League	Relegated to Amateur Leagues
2006–07	Group 1: DBB Diskispor (winner), Adanaspor; Group 2: Araklıspor (winner), Bugsaşspor (runner-up), Değirmenderespor (play-off); Group 3: Bozüyükspor (winner), Afyonkarahisarspor (runner-up); Group 4: Gaziosmanpaşaspor (winner), Tepecik Belediyespor (runner-up), Alibeyköyspor (play-off)	Group 1: Osmaniyespor, Karamanspor; Group 2: Iğdırspor; Group 3: Aliağa Belediyespor, Sidespor; Group 4: Çorluspor, Bakırköyspor

=== 2007–08 season ===
Promotion from amateur leagues: Körfez Belediyespor, Konya Şekerspor, Tavşanlı B TKİ Linyit, Torbalıspor, Bafra Belediyespor, Malatya Belediyespor, Bingöl Belediyespor.

Promotion and relegation:

Season	Promoted to TFF Second League	Relegated to Amateur Leagues
2007–08	Group 1: Belediye Vanspor, Malatya Belediyespor, Karsspor; Group 2: Tokatspor, Ofspor, Çorumspor; Group 3: Denizli Belediyespor, Akhisar Belediyespor, Konya Şekerspor; Group 4: Beykoz 1908, Beylerbeyi, Körfez Belediyespor; Promotion play-offs: Darıca Gençlerbirliği, Altınordu	Group 1: Antakyaspor, Nusaybin Demirspor, Cizre Spor, Mezitlispor; Group 2: Bağlum Belediyespor, Gazi Belediyespor, Artvin Hopaspor; Group 3: Kütahyaspor, Muğlaspor, Yeni Ereğlispor, Yeni Burdurspor; Group 4: Bursa Merinosspor, Zonguldakspor, Küçükçekmecespor, Bilecikspor

=== 2008–09 season ===
In 2008–09 season the league contained 51 clubs spread out over 5 groups with 10 or 11 clubs. The groups were determined in regions. The top two clubs from each group qualified to the Promotion Group. The remaining groups with other teams were called Classification Groups. Top four teams in Promotion Group are directly promoted to TFF Second League. The three teams classified 5th to 7th in Promotion Group join the extra play-offs with the top teams from each of the 5 Classifying Groups. These 8 teams play a knockout competition (in neutral venue) to determine the last two teams to be promoted. The bottom two teams of Classifying Groups are relegated to the Amateur Leagues.

Promotion from amateur leagues: Menemen Belediyespor, Bandırmaspor, Keçiören Belediyespor, TKİ Tavşanlı Linyitspor, Bağlar Vuralspor.

Promotion and relegation:

Season	Promoted to TFF Second League	Relegated to Amateur Leagues
2008–09	Göztepe (Promotion Group winner); Tepecik Belediyespor (Promotion Group runner-up); TKİ Tavşanlı Linyitspor (Promotion Group 3rd place); Kahramanmaraşspor (Promotion Group 4th place); Yalovaspor, Pursaklarspor (Extra play-off winners)	Group 1: Orhangazi Gençlerbirliği, Fatih Karagümrük; Group 2: Aydınspor, Mustafakemalpaşaspor; Group 3: Aksarayspor, Uşakspor; Group 4: Erzincanspor, DÇ Divriğispor; Group 5: Ceyhanspor, Bağlar Vuralspor, Kilis Belediyespor, Şırnakspor

=== 2009–10 season ===
In 2009–10 season league was played by 53 teams, 11 teams in groups 1–4 and 9 teams in group 5. Top two teams of ranking groups again promoted to promotion group. Top two teams of promotion group directly promoted to 2010–11 TFF Second League. The Third team was determined by extra play-offs between 3rd–5th teams of promotion group and winners of classification groups. Last three teams in groups 1–4 and last team in group 5 were relegated to Regional Amateur League.

Promotion from amateur leagues: Kırıkhanspor, Bayrampaşaspor, Çerkezköy Belediyespor, Tekirova Belediyespor, Muğlaspor, Trabzon Yalıspor.

Promotion and relegation:

Season	Promoted to TFF Second League	Relegated to Amateur Leagues
2009–10	Bandırmaspor (promotion group winner); Balıkesirspor (promotion group runner-up); Malatya Belediyespor (extra play-off winner)	Group 1: Alibeyköyspor, Çerkezköy Belediyespor, Küçükköyspor; Group 2: İzmirspor, Muğlaspor, Marmaris Belediyespor; Group 3: Kartal Belediyespor, Düzcespor, Maltepespor; Group 4: Sürmenespor, Bafra Belediyespor, Bulancakspor; Group 5: Şanlıurfa Belediyespor

=== 2010–11 season ===
In 2010–11 season status of the league has been changed. League is played with 54 teams in three groups, 18 in each. The groups were determined by casting lots on a non-regional basis. The winners of each group directly promotes to TFF Second League. In each group 2nd through 5th teams play promotion play-offs to determine second team to be promoted to TFF Second League. Bottom three teams in each group were relegated to Turkish Regional Amateur League.

Promotion from amateur leagues: Sivas Dört Eylül Belediyespor, Kırklarelispor, İskenderunspor 1967, Kepez Belediyespor, Sancaktepe Belediyespor.

Promotion and relegation:

Season	Promoted to TFF Second League	Relegated to Amateur Leagues
2010–11	Group 1: Tepecikspor (winner), Ünyespor (Play-off); Group 2: Kırklarelispor (winner), Altınordu (Play-off); Group 3: Gaziosmanpaşaspor (winner), Denizli Belediyespor (Play-off)	Group 1: Kırşehirspor, 72 Batmanspor, Malatyaspor; Group 2: Beykozspor 1908, Ispartaspor, Erzurumspor; Group 3: Yalovaspor, Torbalıspor, Zeytinburnuspor

Source: Turkish Soccer and TFF league page

=== 2011–12 season ===
In 2011–12 season status of the league has been changed. League is played with 57 teams in three groups, 19 in each. The groups were determined by casting lots on a non-regional basis. The winners of each group directly promotes to TFF Second League. In each group 2nd through 5th teams play promotion play-offs to determine second team to be promoted to TFF Second League. Bottom four teams in each group were relegated to Turkish Regional Amateur League.

Promotion from amateur leagues: Erzurum Büyükşehir Belediyespor, Erganispor, Beşikdüzüspor, Çarşambaspor, Elazığ Belediyespor, Manavgat Evrensekispor, Kilimli Belediyespor, Aydınspor 1923, Yeni Sandıklı Belediyespor, Maltepespor, Ümraniyespor, Küçükçekmecespor

Promotion and relegation:

Season	Promoted to TFF Second League	Relegated to Amateur League
2011–12	Group 1: İnegölspor (winner), Bayrampaşaspor (play-off); Group 2: Nazilli Belediyespor (winner), Kahramanmaraşspor (play-off); Group 3: Hatayspor (winner), Tarsus İdmanyurdu (play-off)	Group 1: MKE Kırıkkalespor, Lüleburgazspor, Keçiören Sportif A.Ş., Akçaabat Sebatspor; Group 2: Karsspor, Küçükçekmecespor, Kepez Belediyespor, Erganispor; Group 3: Diyarbakır Kayapınar Belediyespor, Afyonkarahisarspor, Araklıspor, Çarşambaspor

=== 2012–13 season ===
In 2012–13 season status of the league has been changed. League is played with 54 teams in three groups, 18 in each. The groups were determined by casting lots on a non-regional basis. The winners of each group directly promotes to TFF Second League. In each group 2nd through 5th teams play promotion play-offs to determine second team to be promoted to TFF Second League. Bottom three teams in each group are relegated to Turkish Regional Amateur League.

Promotion from Turkish Regional Amateur League: Bergama Belediyespor, Silivrispor, Kahramanmaraş Belediyespor, Kayseri Şekerspor, Çorum Belediyespor, Isparta Emrespor, Fatih Karagümrük SK, Derince Belediyespor and Refahiyespor

Promotion and relegation:

Season	Promoted to TFF Second League	Relegated to Amateur Leagues
2012–13	Group 1: Diyarbakır BŞB., Pazarspor (Play-off); Group 2: Aydınspor 1923, Çanakkale Dardanelspor (Play-off); Group 3: Altınordu, Gümüşhanespor (Play-off)	Group 1: Kastamonuspor, Beşikdüzüspor, Çorumspor; Group 2: Kilimli Belediyespor, İskenderunspor 1967, Gebzespor; Group 3: Isparta Emrespor, Diyarbakırspor, Mardinspor

=== 2013–14 season ===
In 2013–14 season league is played with 54 teams in three groups, 18 in each. 4 teams relegated from 2012–13 TFF Second League: Denizli Belediyespor, Çamlıdere Şekerspor, Ünyespor, Sakaryaspor. Eleven teams promoted from 2012–13 Turkish Regional Amateur League. The groups were determined by casting lots on a non-regional basis. The winners of each group directly promotes to TFF Second League. In each group 2nd through 5th teams play promotion play-offs to determine second team to be promoted to TFF Second League. Bottom three teams in each group are relegated to Turkish Regional Amateur League.

Promotion from Turkish Regional Amateur League: Trabzon Düzyurtspor, Yeni Diyarbakırspor, 1930 Bafraspor, Payas Belediyespor 1975, 68 Yeni Aksarayspor, Adliyespor, Kızılcabölükspor, Balçova Belediyespor, Ayvalıkgücü Belediyespor, Çıksalınspor and Tuzlaspor

Promotion and relegation:

Season	Promoted to TFF Second League	Relegated to Amateur Leagues
2013–14	Group 1: Ümraniyespor, Fatih Karagümrük (Play-off); Group 2: Trabzon Düzyurtspor, Hacettepe SK (Play-off); Group 3: Keçiörengücü, Menemen Belediyespor (Play-off)	Group 1: Adıyamanspor, Siirtspor, Belediye Bingölspor; Group 2: Çıksalınspor, Ünyespor, Elazığ Belediyespor; Group 3: Yimpaş Yozgatspor, Kocaelispor, 1930 Bafraspor

Source: TFF Third League archive.

=== 2014–15 season ===
In 2014–15 season league is played with 54 teams in three groups, 18 in each. 6 teams relegated from 2012–13 TFF Second League: Çanakkale Dardanelspor, Gaziosmanpaşaspor, Çankırıspor, Eyüpspor, İstanbul Güngörenspor and Bozüyükspor. Nine teams promoted from 2013–14 Turkish Regional Amateur League. The groups were determined by casting lots on a non-regional basis. The winners of each group directly promotes to TFF Second League. In each group 2nd through 5th teams play promotion play-offs to determine second team to be promoted to TFF Second League. Bottom three teams in each group are relegated to Turkish Regional Amateur League.

Promotion from Turkish Regional Amateur League: Bayburt İl Özel İdarespor, Erzin Belediyespor, Niğde Belediyespor, Etimesgut Belediyespor, Çine Madranspor, Tire 1922 Spor, Zonguldak Kömürspor, Çatalcaspor and Halide Edip Adıvar SK

Promotion and relegation:

Season	Promoted to TFF Second League	Relegated to Amateur Leagues
2014–15	Group 1: Tuzlaspor, İstanbulspor (Play-off); Group 2: Eyüpspor, Sivas 4 Eylül Belediyespor (Play-off); Group 3: Anadolu Üsküdar, Ankara Demirspor (Play-off)	Group 1: Tutap Şekerspor, Trabzon Akçaabat FK, Bozüyükspor; Group 2: Halide Edip Adıvar SK, 68 Yeni Aksarayspor, Çankırıspor; Group 3: Balçova Yaşamspor, Kayseri Şekerspor, İstanbul Güngörenspor

=== 2015–16 season ===
In 2015–16 season league was played with 57 teams in three groups, 19 in each. Six teams relegated from 2012–13 TFF Second League: Çanakkale Dardanelspor, Gaziosmanpaşaspor, Çankırıspor, Eyüpspor, İstanbul Güngörenspor and Bozüyükspor. Nine teams promoted from 2013–14 Turkish Regional Amateur League. The groups were determined by casting lots on a non-regional basis. The winners of each group directly promotes to TFF Second League. In each group 2nd through 5th teams play promotion play-offs to determine second team to be promoted to TFF Second League. Bottom four teams in each group are relegated to Turkish Regional Amateur League. However, Cizre Spor did not field a team in the second half of the season due to operations against the PKK in Cizre. For this reason, Cizre Spor was not relegated from the 3rd League.

Promotion from Turkish Regional Amateur League: Cizre Spor, Yomraspor, Dersimspor, Kozan Belediyespor, Kastamonuspor 1966, Zara Belediyespor, Bodrum Belediye Bodrumspor, Manisa Büyükşehir Belediyespor, Sultanbeyli Belediyespor, Düzcespor and Tekirdağspor

Promotion and relegation:

Season	Promoted to TFF Second League	Relegated to Amateur Leagues
2015–16	Group 1: BB Erzurumspor, Zonguldak Kömürspor (Play-off); Group 2: Etimesgut Belediyespor, Ofspor (Play-off); Group 3: Kastamonuspor 1966, Niğde Belediyespor (Play-off)	Group 1: Arsinspor, Gölbaşıspor, Turgutluspor; Group 2: Kahramanmaraş BB, Zara Belediyespor, Ayvalıkgücü Belediyespor, Gaziosmanpaşaspor; Group 3: Körfez İskenderunspor, TKİ Tavşanlı Linyitspor, Çine Madranspor, Sandıklıspor

== See also ==
- Süper Lig
- TFF 1. Lig
- TFF 2. Lig
- Turkish Regional Amateur League
- Amatör Futbol Ligleri
- Turkish Cup (since 1962–63)
