= Ünyespor =

Turkish sports club

- Full name: Ünyespor Kulübü
- Founded: 1957
- Dissolved: 2015
- Ground: Ünye İlçe Stadium, Ordu
- Capacity: 10,340
- Chairman: İrfan Şahin (last)
- Manager: Cevdet Uzunköprü (last)
Home colours	Away colours

Ünyespor was a sports club located in Ünye, a district in Ordu, Turkey. The club plays its games at the Ünye İlçe Stadium. The club was founded as "Ünye Gençlerbirliği" in 1957 and took the Ünyespor name in 1985.

In 2015 Ünyespor and Ünye Belediyespor merged to become Ünye 1957 Spor.

== League participations ==
- TFF First League: 1987–88, 1990–94, 1996–97
- TFF Second League: 1984–87, 1988–90, 1997–01, 2004–07, 2011–13
- TFF Third League: 2001–04, 2007–11, 2013–15
