= 2013–14 Galatasaray S.K. season =

Galatasaray
2013–14 season
- President: Ünal Aysal
- Head coach: Fatih Terim (until 25 September 2013); Roberto Mancini (from 30 September 2013)
- Stadium: Türk Telekom Arena
- Süper Lig: 2nd
- Turkish Cup: Winners
- Turkish Super Cup: Winners
- UEFA Champions League: Round of 16
- Top goalscorer: League: Burak Yılmaz (16); All: Burak Yılmaz (18)
- Highest home attendance: 51,350 vs Fenerbahçe (Süper Lig, 6 April 2014)
- Lowest home attendance: 4,500 vs Antalyaspor (Turkish Cup, 12 February 2014)
- Average home league attendance: 40,094
Home colours	Away colours	Third colours

The 2013–14 season was Galatasaray's 110th in existence and 56th consecutive season in the Süper Lig. The club was aiming for an unprecedented twentieth league title, after winning the Süper Lig in the previous season.

In Europe, Galatasaray competed in the UEFA Champions League for a thirteenth season. They also competed in the Turkish Cup, entering in the fourth round, as well as the Turkish Super Cup.

This article shows statistics of the club's players in the season, and also lists all matches that the club played during the season. The season covered a period from 1 July 2013 to 30 June 2014.

== Club ==
=== Board of directors ===
Position	Staff
President	(Turkey) Ünal Aysal
Deputy President	(Turkey) Özkan Olcay
Vice-President	(Turkey) Candan Erçetin
Vice-President	(Turkey) Ümit Özdemir
General Secretary	(Turkey) Adnan Nas
	(Turkey) Mete İkiz
	(Turkey) Şükrü Ergün
	(Turkey) Sedat Doğan
	(Turkey) Aka Gündüz Özdemir
	(Turkey) Emir Sarıgül
	(Turkey) Mehmet Cibara
	(Turkey) Ahmet Yüce Ocaklı
	(Turkey) Mehmet Emin İpekdokuyan
	(Turkey) Mehmet Karlı
	(Turkey) Necati Demirkol
	(Turkey) Ebru Köksal

=== Technical Staff ===
Position	Staff
Manager	(Italy) Roberto Mancini
Assistant Coach	(Turkey) Tugay Kerimoğlu
Assistant Coach	(Italy) Attilio Lombardo
Assistant Coach	(Italy) Fausto Salsano
Goalkeeper Coach	(Brazil) Cláudio Taffarel
Fitness Coach	(Italy) Ivan Carminati
Chief Analyst	(Italy) Marco Fumagalli
Conditioner	(Turkey) Yasin Küçük
Chief Scout	(Turkey) Erdal Keser
Chief Scout	(Turkey) Emre Utkucan
Director of Football	(Czech Republic) Tomáš Ujfaluši

=== Medical Staff ===
Position	Staff
Doctor	(Turkey) Yener İnce (Turkey) Anıl Işık
Physiotherapist	(Turkey) Mustafa Korkmaz (Turkey) Burak Koca (Turkey) İlhan Er
Masseur	(Turkey) Uğur Durul (Turkey) Sedat Peker (Turkey) Erkan Kazancı (Turkey) Serdal Yılmaz

=== Grounds ===
Ground (capacity and dimensions)	Türk Telekom Arena (52,652 / 105x68m)
Training ground	Florya Metin Oktay Sports Complex and Training Center

=== Kit ===
Uniform Manufacturer: Nike

Chest Advertising's: Türk Telekom

Back Advertising's: Ülker

Arm Advertising's: Avea

Short Advertising's: HCL

Home
Away
Third

== Sponsorship ==
Companies that Galatasaray S.K. had sponsorship deals with during the season included the following.

Licensee	Product
Türk Telekom	Main Sponsor
Nike	Technical Sponsor
Avea	Cosponsor
Ülker	Cosponsor
Opel	Cosponsor
HCL ME Tablet	Cosponsor
Turkish Airlines	Official Sponsor
Microsoft	Official Sponsor
Hedef Filo Hizmetleri	Official Sponsor
HDI-Gerling	Official Sponsor
Medical Park	Official Sponsor
Yandex	Official Sponsor
MNG Kargo	Official Sponsor
Sarar	Official Sponsor
Denizbank	Official Sponsor
W Collection	Official Sponsor
Tacirler Yatırım	Official Sponsor
Fox International Channels	Media Sponsor
Diversey	Official Supplier
GNC	Official Supplier

== Season overview ==
- At the end of the 2012–13 season, Galatasaray began official negotiations regarding the transfer of French centre-back Aurélien Chedjou from Lille. On 25 May 2013, it was reported that Chedjou had signed a four-year contract with Galatasaray. Galatasaray's original bid was reported as €6.3 million, with Chedjou set to receive a salary of €2.2 million per year.
- On 5 June 2013, Galatasaray signed Turkish midfielder Erman Kılıç. He had been out of contract from his last club Sivasspor, and was set to receive a salary of €380,000 (950,000 ₺) per year.
- On 6 June 2013, Galatasaray offered a new contract to left-back Hakan Balta. The club announced that the contract would be valid until 2016, with Balta set to receive a salary of €950,000 per year.
- On 21 June 2013, Galatasaray revealed the pre-season summer camp schedule on the website. The camp schedule for the Galatasaray professional football team prior to the next football season began on Monday, 1 July at the Florya Metin Oktay Facilities. On 8 July, the squad flew to Birmingham in England for an eight-day camp at the St George's Park National Football Centre. During the camp, Galatasaray played two friendlies against English teams. Following the second match, the club returned to Istanbul on 20 July before flying to Izmir the next day to play another friendly, against Málaga. On 29 July, Galatasaray played Napoli at the Stadio San Paolo to continue its summer camp. On 2 August, the club flew to London to participate in the Emirates Cup, hosted by Arsenal. Finally, on 11 August, Galatasaray returned to Istanbul to continue its preparations for the 2013 Turkish Super Cup against Fenerbahçe in a derby.
- On 2 July 2013, Galatasaray offered new contracts to centre-back Gökhan Zan and midfielder Engin Baytar. The club announced that the contracts would be valid until 2016 and that the two players would receive a salary of €850,000 per year. Also on the same day, goalkeeper Ufuk Ceylan was transfer listed by request.
- On 4 July 2013, Galatasaray did not offer a new contract to winger Aydın Yılmaz. There were no negotiations, and therefore he was not considered a first team player. Also on the same day, left-back Çağlar Birinci was released from the club.
- On 8 July 2013, Galatasaray announced the 23-man squad for the pre-season summer camp. Manager Fatih Terim did not add six players to the camp squad, all of which were either out of contract or transfer listed. Also on the same day, it was revealed that the club had parted ways with veteran Czech defender Tomáš Ujfaluši. He had been out of contract since 30 June and the club allegedly did not seek to extend his contract further.
- On 9 July 2013, it was announced that Galatasaray and Toulouse had reached an agreement for the transfer of Turkish striker Umut Bulut. He had spent been on at loan at Galatasaray during the previous season and managed to score fifteen goals in 38 matches. The original bid by Galatasaray was reported at €2.7 million. The contract would be valid until 2017 and Bulut was set to receive a salary of €1.7 million per year.
- On 16 July 2013, Galatasaray began official negotiations regarding the transfer of Brazilian midfielder Felipe Melo from Juventus. Melo had previously spent his last two seasons on loan at Galatasaray. On 20 July 2013, it was reported that Felipe Melo had signed a three-year contract with Galatasaray. The club's original bid was reported at €3.75 million, with Melo receiving a salary of €3.1 million per year.
- On 19 July 2013, it was announced that midfielder Furkan Özçal would be loaned out for a year to Karabükspor. Galatasaray also received €100,000.
- On 28 July 2013, Galatasaray announced a sponsorship agreement with Indian IT company HCL Technologies. HCL would be advertised on Galatasaray's kit's shorts in exchange for $1.5 million per year.
- On 1 August 2013, it was announced that striker Sercan Yıldırım would be loaned out for a year to Şanlıurfaspor.
- On 4 August 2013, Galatasaray won the 2013 Emirates Cup, hosted by Arsenal.

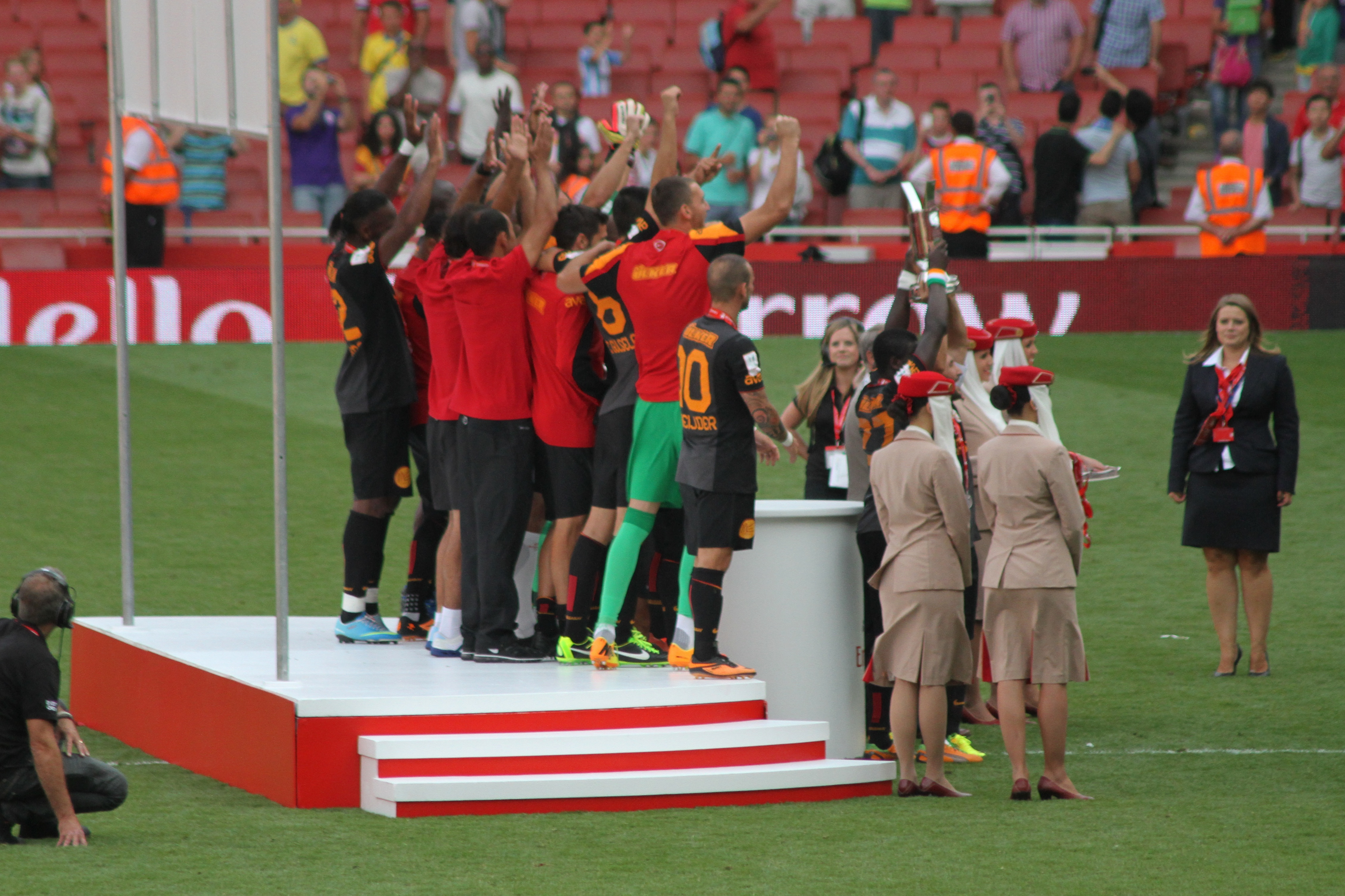
2013 Emirates Cup celebration at Emirates Stadium

- On 7 August 2013, it was announced that the contract of midfielder Emmanuel Culio had been terminated by Galatasaray.
- On 11 August 2013, as Süper Lig champions, Galatasaray began the season against the holders of the Turkish Cup, Fenerbahçe in the 2013 Turkish Super Cup. The match was played at Kadir Has Stadium. Galatasaray won the Super Cup title for a second consecutive year.
- On 21 August 2013, it was announced that striker Johan Elmander would be loaned out for a year to Norwich City. Galatasaray also received €1.67 million.
- On 22 August 2013, Galatasaray announced a sponsorship agreement with W Collection.
- On 22 August 2013, it was announced that manager Fatih Terim would also become the interim manager of the Turkey national team.
- Having won the league last season, Galatasaray began their UEFA Champions League campaign in the group stage. Courtesy of their UEFA coefficient, they were seeded in Pot 3 for the draw, which took place in Monaco on 29 August 2013. Galatasaray were drawn into Group B alongside Real Madrid, Juventus and Copenhagen. Galatasaray were previously drawn with Real Madrid and Juventus in group and knockout stages, while Copenhagen was a new opponent.
- On 2 September 2013, hours before the registration deadline for UEFA, Galatasaray began official negotiations regarding the transfer of Portuguese winger Bruma from Sporting CP.
- On 3 September 2013, it was reported that Bruma had signed a five-year contract with Galatasaray. The club's original bid was reported at €10 million, with Bruma set to receive a salary of €1 million per year.
- On 3 September 2013, two months after the previous contract offer, Aydın Yılmaz signed a new contract with Galatasaray until 2016. Aydın was set to receive a salary of €680,000 per year. On the same day, the club also renewed Aykut Erçetin's contract for another year.
- On 4 September 2013, it was announced that midfielder Colin Kazim-Richards would be transferred to Bursaspor for a €250,000 transfer fee.
- On 6 September 2013, it was announced that midfielder Erman Kılıç would be transferred to Eskişehirspor for a €200,000 transfer fee.
- On 12 September 2013, Galatasaray announced a sponsorship agreement with Fox International Channels.
- On 24 September 2013, Galatasaray announced the dismissal of head coach Fatih Terim.
- On 30 September 2013, Galatasaray announced their new head coach, Roberto Mancini. Mancini signed a three-year contract beginning from the 2013–14 season, and was set to receive a salary of €3.5 million per year.
- On 4 January 2014, it was announced that Engin Baytar would be loaned out to Çaykur Rizespor for the rest of the season.
- On 5 January 2014, Galatasaray began official negotiations regarding the transfer of Bosnian Izet Hajrović from Grasshopper.
- On 8 January 2014, it was announced that Galatasaray and Grasshopper had reached an agreement for the transfer of Izet Hajrović; the original bid was reported at €3.5 million. Galatasaray announced that the contract would last until 2018 and that Hajrović would receive a salary of €1.1 million per year.
- On 15 January 2014, Galatasaray began official negotiations regarding the transfer of Turkish player Salih Dursun from Kayserispor.
- On 15 January 2014, Galatasaray began official negotiations regarding the transfer of midfielder Umut Gündoğan from Bucaspor.
- On 15 January 2014, Galatasaray began official negotiations regarding the transfer of Endogan Adili from Basel.
- On 16 January 2014, Galatasaray began official negotiations regarding the transfer of Brazilian left-back Alex Telles from Grêmio.
- On 17 January 2014, it was announced that Galatasaray and Bucaspor had reached an agreement for the transfer of Umut Gündoğan. Galatasaray's original bid was reported at €550,000. The contract was set to last until 2018, with Gündoğan set to receive a salary of €200,000 for the second half of the season.
- On 17 January 2014, it was announced that Galatasaray and Kayserispor had reached an agreement for the transfer of right-back Salih Dursun. The original bid by Galatasaray was reported as €2.75 million. Galatasaray announced that the contract would remain until 2018 and that Salih would receive a salary of €200,000 for the second half of the season.
- On 21 January 2014, it was announced that Sercan Yıldırım had been loaned out to Bursaspor for the rest of the season.
- On 22 January 2014, it was announced that Galatasaray and Grêmio had reached an agreement for the transfer of Alex Telles. The original bid by Galatasaray was reported as €6.15 million. Galatasaray announced that the contract would remain until 2018 and that Telles would receive a salary of €650,000 for the second half of the season.
- On 27 January 2014, it was announced that Nordin Amrabat had been loaned out to Malaga for the remainder of the season.
- On 28 January 2014, it was announced that the contract of Albert Riera had been terminated.
- On 28 January 2014, Galatasaray announced a sponsorship agreement with Tacirler Forex for four and a half years.
- On 29 January 2014, it was announced that Galatasaray and Manisaspor had reached an agreement for the transfer of midfielder Oğuzhan Kayar. The original bid by Galatasaray was reported as €750,000.
- On 29 January 2014, it was announced that Bruma had been loaned out to Gaziantepspor for the remainder of the season.
- On 29 January 2014, Galatasaray began official negotiations regarding the transfer of centre-back Koray Günter from Borussia Dortmund.
- On 29 January 2014, Galatasaray began official negotiations regarding the transfer of Argentinian winger Lucas Ontivero from Centro Atlético Fénix.
- On 30 January 2014, it was announced that Galatasaray and Borussia Dortmund had reached an agreement for the transfer of Koray Günter. The original bid by Galatasaray was reported as €2.5 million. Galatasaray announced that the contract would remain until 2018 and that Günter would receive a salary of €300,000 for the second half of the season.
- On 31 January 2014, it was announced that Galatasaray and Centro Atlético Fénix had reached an agreement for the transfer of Lucas Ontivero. The original bid by Galatasaray was reported as €2 million. Galatasaray announced that the contract would remain until 2018 and that Lucas would receive a salary of €175,000 for the second half of the season.
- On 1 February 2014, it was announced that Dany Nounkeu had been loaned out to Beşiktaş for the rest of the season.
- On 2 February 2014, it was announced that Galatasaray and Boca Juniors had reached an agreement for the loaning in of centre-back Guillermo Burdisso.
- On 3 February 2014, Galatasaray began official negotiations regarding the transfer of defender Veysel Sarı from Eskişehirspor.
- On 3 February 2014, it was announced that Yiğit Gökoğlan had been loaned out to Kayseri Erciyesspor for the remainder of the season.
- On 3 February 2014, it was announced that Galatasaray and Eskişehirspor had reached an agreement for the transfer of Veysel Sarı. The original bid by Galatasaray was reported as €300,000. Galatasaray announced that the contract would remain until 2018 and that Veysel would receive a salary of €400,000 for the second half of the season.
- On 3 February 2014, it was announced that Galatasaray and Boca Juniors had reached an agreement for the loan of Guillermo Burdisso. The original bid by Galatasaray was reported as €185,000. Galatasaray announced that the contract would remain until the end of the season and that Burdisso would receive a salary of €300,000 for the second half of the season.
- On 19 February 2014, Galatasaray announced a sponsorship agreement with Microsoft.
- On 29 April 2014, Galatasaray made a link between Astana Presidential Sports Club to form a strategic alliance.

== Players ==
=== Squad information ===
N	Pos.	Nat.	Name	Age	EU	Since	App	Goals	Ends	Transfer fee	Notes
2	DF	(Argentina)	Guillermo Burdisso	38	EU	2014	4	0	2015	€0.185M	
3	MF	(Brazil)	Felipe Melo	43	EU	2011	118	16	2016	€3.75M	
4	MF	(Turkey)	Hamit Altıntop	43	EU	2012	48	1	2016	€3.5M	
5	DF	(Turkey)	Gökhan Zan	45	Non-EU	2009	76	4	2016	Free	
6	MF	(Turkey)	Ceyhun Gülselam	38	EU	2011	47	3	2014	Free	
7	MF	(Turkey)	Aydın Yılmaz	38	Non-EU	2006	125	7	2016	Youth system	
8	MF	(Turkey)	Selçuk İnan	41	Non-EU	2011	127	29	2016	Free	
10	MF	(Netherlands)	Wesley Sneijder	42	EU	2013	59	21	2016	€7.5M	
11	FW	(Ivory Coast)	Didier Drogba	48	EU	2013	53	20	2015	Free	
14	MF	(Bosnia and Herzegovina)	Izet Hajrović	35	EU	2014	12	1	2018	€3.5M	
15	DF	(Brazil)	Alex Telles	33	Non-EU	2014	21	1	2018	€6.15M	
17	FW	(Turkey)	Burak Yılmaz	41	Non-EU	2012	83	50	2016	€5M	
19	FW	(Turkey)	Umut Bulut	43	Non-EU	2012	84	23	2015	€2.7M	
21	DF	(Cameroon)	Aurélien Chedjou	40	EU	2013	33	4	2017	€6.3M	
22	DF	(Turkey)	Hakan Balta	43	EU	2007	231	9	2016	€1M + Ferhat Öztorun	
25	GK	(Uruguay)	Fernando Muslera	40	EU	2011	122	1	2016	€6.75M + Lorik Cana	
26	DF	(Turkey)	Semih Kaya	35	Non-EU	2008	112	1	2016	Youth system	
27	DF	(Ivory Coast)	Emmanuel Eboué	43	EU	2011	101	5	2015	€3.5M	
28	DF	(Turkey)	Koray Günter	32	EU	2014	7	0	2018	€2.5M	
32	MF	(Turkey)	İbrahim Coşkun	31	EU	2013	1	0	2016	€0.5M	
35	MF	(Turkey)	Yekta Kurtuluş	40	Non-EU	2011	64	3	2015	€3.75M	
40	DF	(Turkey)	Emre Can Coşkun	32	Non-EU	2014	2	0	2016	Youth system	
45	DF	(Turkey)	Oğuzhan Kayar	31	Non-EU	2014	1	0	2018	€0.75M	
52	MF	(Turkey)	Emre Çolak	35	Non-EU	2009	111	9	2016	Youth system	
55	MF	(Turkey)	Sabri Sarıoğlu (C)	42	Non-EU	2002	289	15	2015	Youth system	
66	DF	(Turkey)	Salih Dursun	35	Non-EU	2014	6	0	2018	€2.75M	
67	GK	(Turkey)	Eray İşcan	35	Non-EU	2011	9	0	2014	Youth system	
82	GK	(Turkey)	Aykut Erçetin	44	EU	2003	61	0	2014	Free	
86	GK	(Turkey)	Ufuk Ceylan	40	Non-EU	2009	36	0	2014	€1M + 3 Players	
88	DF	(Turkey)	Veysel Sarı	38	Non-EU	2014	11	1	2018	€0.3M	
90	MF	(Turkey)	Umut Gündoğan	36	EU	2014	5	0	2018	€0.55M	
94	MF	(Argentina)	Lucas Ontivero	32	Non-EU	2014	6	0	2018	€2M	

- Last updated: 17 May 2014
- Source: Galatasaray.org, Players in / out, Wikipedia players' articles, and footballdatabase.com (for EU passport)
- Ordered by Last season starting 11 and position on pitch (from back right to front left).

=== Transfers ===
==== In ====
No.	Pos.	Nat.	Name	Age	EU	Moving from	Type	Transfer window	Ends	Transfer fee	Source
21	DF	(Cameroon)	Aurélien Chedjou	40	EU	Lille (France)	Transfer	Summer	2017	€6.3M	Galatasaray.org
24	MF	(Turkey)	Erman Kılıç	43	Non-EU	Sivasspor	Transfer	Summer	2016	Free	Galatasaray.org
19	FW	(Turkey)	Umut Bulut	43	Non-EU	Toulouse (France)	Transfer	Summer	2017	€2.7M	Galatasaray.org
3	MF	(Brazil)	Felipe Melo	43	EU	Juventus (Italy)	Transfer	Summer	2016	€3.75M	Galatasaray.org
6	MF	(Turkey)	Ceyhun Gülselam	38	EU	Kayserispor	Loan return	Summer	2014	N/A	
20	MF	(Portugal)	Bruma	32	EU	Sporting CP (Portugal)	Transfer	Summer	2018	€10.0M	Galatasaray.org
14	MF	(Bosnia and Herzegovina)	Izet Hajrović	35	EU	Grasshopper Club Zürich (Switzerland)	Transfer	Winter	2018	€3.5M	Galatasaray.org
66	DF	(Turkey)	Salih Dursun	35	Non-EU	Kayserispor	Transfer	Winter	2018	€2.75M	Galatasaray.org
90	MF	(Turkey)	Umut Gündoğan	36	EU	Bucaspor	Transfer	Winter	2018	€0.55M	Galatasaray.org
15	DF	(Brazil)	Alex Telles	34	Non-EU	Grêmio	Transfer	Winter	2018	€6.15M	Galatasaray.org
45	MF	(Turkey)	Oğuzhan Kayar	31	Non-EU	Manisaspor	Transfer	Winter	2018	€0.75M	KAP.gov.tr
28	DF	(Turkey)	Koray Günter	32	EU	Borussia Dortmund (Germany)	Transfer	Winter	2018	€2.5M	Galatasaray.org
94	MF	(Argentina)	Lucas Ontivero	32	Non-EU	Centro Atlético Fénix	Transfer	Winter	2018	€2M	Galatasaray.org
88	DF	(Turkey)	Veysel Sarı	38	Non-EU	Eskişehirspor	Transfer	Winter	2018	€0.3M	Galatasaray.org
2	DF	(Argentina)	Guillermo Burdisso	38	EU	Boca Juniors	Loan	Winter	2015	€0.185M	Galatasaray.org

Total spending: ▼€41.435M

==== Out ====
No.	Pos.	Nat.	Name	Age	EU	Moving to	Type	Transfer window	Transfer fee	Source
23	MF	(Turkey)	Furkan Özçal	36	EU	Kardemir Karabükspor	Loan	Summer	€0.1M	Galatasaray.org
39	FW	(Turkey)	Okan Derici	33	EU	Rot-Weiß Erfurt (Germany)	Transfer	Summer	Free	Radikal.com.tr
17	DF	(Czech Republic)	Tomáš Ujfaluši	48	EU	Sparta Prague (Czech Republic)	End of contract	Summer	Free	Denik.cz
33	DF	(Turkey)	Çağlar Birinci	41	Non-EU	Elazığspor	End of contract	Summer	Free	Radikal.com.tr
	FW	(Turkey)	Serdar Eylik	36	Non-EU	Ankaraspor	Loan	Summer	Undisclosed	
	MF	(Turkey)	Ozan Arif Önal	32	Non-EU	Erzurumspor	Transfer	Summer	Undisclosed	Webaslan.com
	MF	(Turkey)	Mert Baş	31	Non-EU	Erdekspor	Transfer	Summer	Undisclosed	Webaslan.com
	MF	(Turkey)	Emre Yüksektepe	35	Non-EU	Bandırmaspor	Transfer	Summer	Undisclosed	Webaslan.com
	MF	(Turkey)	Deniz Yanılmaz	33	Non-EU	Tepecikspor A.Ş.	Transfer	Summer	Undisclosed	Webaslan.com
	MF	(Turkey)	Uğur Ayhan	33	Non-EU	İstanbulspor	Loan	Summer	Undisclosed	Webaslan.com
	MF	(Turkey)	Serkan Göksu	33	Non-EU	Yeni Malatyaspor	Loan	Summer	Undisclosed	Webaslan.com
	DF	(Turkey)	Ahmet Kesim	36	Non-EU	Aydınspor	End of contract	Summer	Free	Haberler.com
19	FW	(Turkey)	Mehmet Batdal	40	Non-EU	BBSK	Transfer	Summer	Free	NTVSpor.net
17	FW	(Turkey)	Mertan Caner Öztürk	34	Non-EU	Altınordu A.Ş.	Transfer	Summer	Undisclosed	Fotospor.com
90	FW	(Turkey)	Sercan Yıldırım	36	Non-EU	Şanlıurfaspor	Loan	Summer	€0.15M	NTVSpor.net
26	MF	(Argentina)	Emmanuel Culio	43	Non-EU	Deportivo La Coruña (Spain)	Transfer	Summer	Free	Galatasaray.org
9	FW	(Sweden)	Johan Elmander	45	EU	Norwich City (England)	Loan	Summer	€1.67M	Galatasaray.org
80	FW	(Turkey)	Colin Kazim-Richards	40	EU	Bursaspor	Transfer	Summer	€0.25M	NTVSpor.net
24	MF	(Turkey)	Erman Kılıç	43	Non-EU	Eskişehirspor	Transfer	Summer	€0.2M	NTVSpor.net
50	MF	(Turkey)	Engin Baytar	43	EU	Çaykur Rizespor	Loan	Winter	N/A	Galatasaray.org
90	FW	(Turkey)	Sercan Yıldırım	36	Non-EU	Bursaspor	Loan	Winter	€0.1M	KAP.gov.tr
53	MF	(Morocco)	Nordin Amrabat	39	EU	Málaga (Spain)	Loan	Winter	€0.3M	KAP.gov.tr
11	MF	(Spain)	Albert Riera	44	EU	Metalist Kharkiv (Ukraine)	Contract termination	Winter	Free	KAP.gov.tr
20	MF	(Portugal)	Bruma	32	EU	Gaziantepspor	Loan	Winter	Free	KAP.gov.tr
13	DF	(Cameroon)	Dany Nounkeu	40	EU	Beşiktaş	Loan	Winter	N/A	KAP.gov.tr
39	MF	(Turkey)	Yiğit Gökoğlan	37	Non-EU	Kayseri Erciyesspor	Loan	Winter	N/A	Galatasaray.org

Total income: ▲€2.77M

Expenditure: ▼€38.665M

== Competitions ==
=== Overall ===
Trophy	Started round	First match	Result	Last match
Süper Lig	—	18 August 2013	2nd	17 May 2014
Turkish Cup	Fourth round	3 December 2013	Winners	7 May 2014
Turkish Super Cup	Final	11 August 2013	Winners	
Champions League	Group stage	17 September 2013	Round of 16	18 March 2014

=== Pre-season and friendlies ===
13 July 2013 Friendly	Shrewsbury Town (England)	0–3	(Turkey) Galatasaray	Shrewsbury, England
3:00 PM BST		Report	Çolak 4'; Amrabat 37'; Sneijder 86'	Stadium: New Meadow; Attendance: 5,812

16 July 2013 Friendly	Notts County (England)	1–2	(Turkey) Galatasaray	Nottingham, England
21:30 EEST	Nounkeu 55' (o.g.)	Report	B. Yılmaz 80'; Sneijder 90'	Stadium: Meadow Lane; Attendance: 5,377

21 July 2013 Friendly	Galatasaray (Turkey)	3–3	(Spain) Málaga	İzmir, Turkey
19:30 EEST	Sneijder 13'; Drogba 45'; Kazim-Richards 89'	Report	Santa Cruz 44'; Anderson 57'; Duda 74' (pen.)	Stadium: İzmir Atatürk Stadyumu

29 July 2013 Friendly	Napoli (Italy)	3–1	(Turkey) Galatasaray	Naples, Italy
21:45 EEST	Pandev 5'; Zúñiga 81'; Insigne 90' (pen.)		Amrabat 58'	Stadium: Stadio San Paolo

3 August 2013 Emirates Cup	Galatasaray (Turkey)	1–0	(Portugal) Porto	London, England
14:00 BST	Melo 71' (pen.)			Stadium: Emirates Stadium; Attendance: 59,554

4 August 2013 Emirates Cup	Arsenal (England)	1–2	(Turkey) Galatasaray	London, England
16:20 BST	Walcott 40'		Drogba 79' (pen.), 87'	Stadium: Emirates Stadium; Attendance: 59,608

==== Standings ====
Each team played two matches, with three points awarded for a win, one point for a draw, and a point for every goal scored. In addition, shots on target were taken into account and were used to decide the tournament winners if teams were level on points and goal difference.

Pos	Team	Pld	W	D	L	GF	GA	GD	Pts
1	Galatasaray	2	2	0	0	3	1	+2	9
2	Porto	2	1	0	1	3	2	+1	6
3	Arsenal	2	0	1	1	3	4	−1	4
4	Napoli	2	0	1	1	3	5	−2	4

7 September 2013 Friendly	Galatasaray (Turkey)	3–1	(Turkey) Büyükşehir Belediyespor	Istanbul, Turkey
21:45 EEST	Çolak; A. Yılmaz	Report	Geraldes 14'	Stadium: Florya Metin Oktay Sports Complex and Training Center

10 January 2014 Antalya Cup Semi-Final	Galatasaray (Turkey)	2–1	(Netherlands) Ajax	Antalya, Turkey
20:30 EEST	B. Yılmaz 6'; Coşkun 66'		Van der Hoorn 47'	Stadium: Akdeniz University

12 January 2014 Antalya Cup Final	Galatasaray (Turkey)	0–0 (5–4 p)	(Scotland) Celtic	Antalya, Turkey
18:30 EEST				Stadium: Akdeniz University

=== Turkish Super Cup ===
11 August 2013 Süper Kupa	Galatasaray	1–0 (a.e.t.)	Fenerbahçe	Kayseri, Turkey
	Drogba 99'	Report		Stadium: Kadir Has Stadium; Attendance: 32,000; Referee: Bülent Yıldırım

Source: Competitive Matches

=== Süper Lig ===
==== League table ====
Pos	Team	Pld	W	D	L	GF	GA	GD	Pts	Qualification or relegation
1	Fenerbahçe (C)	34	23	5	6	74	33	+41	74	(Note: Although Fenerbahçe would have qualified for the Champions League group stage as champions, they were barred from participating in next season's European competitions due to UEFA sanctioning because of the 2011 Turkish football match-fixing scandal, with this season also counting for that ban. As a result, the runners-up of the league (Galatasaray) entered the Champions League group stage instead of the third qualifying round, the third-placed team of the league (Beşiktaş) entered the Champions League third qualifying round instead of the Europa League play-off round, and the fourth-placed team of the league (Trabzonspor) entered the Europa League play-off round instead of the third qualifying round.)
2	Galatasaray	34	18	11	5	59	32	+27	65	Qualification for the Champions League group stage
3	Beşiktaş	34	17	11	6	53	33	+20	62	Qualification for the Champions League third qualifying round
4	Trabzonspor	34	14	11	9	53	41	+12	53 (Note: Trabzonspor finished ahead of Sivasspor on head-to-head record: Trabzonspor–Sivasspor 0–0, Sivasspor–Trabzonspor 0–4.)	Qualification for the Europa League play-off round
5	Sivasspor	34	16	5	13	60	55	+5	53	(Note: Sivasspor were banned from European competitions by UEFA due to match-fixing. As a result, their Europa League spot was passed down the league to the next eligible team (Karabükspor).)

Source: tff.org
Rules for classification: 1) points; 2) goal difference; 3) number of goals scored.
(C) Champions

==== Results summary ====
Overall								Home						Away					
Pld	W	D	L	GF	GA	GD	Pts	W	D	L	GF	GA	GD	W	D	L	GF	GA	GD
34	18	11	5	59	32	+27	65	13	2	2	36	16	+20	5	9	3	23	16	+7

Source: Competitive Matches

==== Results by round ====
Round	1	2	3	4	5	6	7	8	9	10	11	12	13	14	15	16	17	18	19	20	21	22	23	24	25	26	27	28	29	30	31	32	33	34
Ground	H	A	A	H	A	H	A	H	A	H	A	H	A	H	A	H	A	A	H	H	A	H	A	H	A	H	A	H	A	H	A	H	A	H
Result	W	D	D	D	W	D	L	W	W	W	L	W	D	W	D	W	W	D	W	W	D	W	D	W	D	L	D	W	L	L	W	W	W	W
Position	6	3	7	7	5	5	9	6	5	4	6	5	4	4	3	3	2	2	2	2	3	2	2	2	2	3	2	2	3	3	2	2	2	2

Source: Competitive Matches
A = Away; H = Home; W = Win; D = Draw; L = Loss

==== Matches ====
19 August 2013 1	Galatasaray	2–1	Gaziantepspor	Istanbul
21:45 EEST	Sneijder 8'; B. Yılmaz 50' (pen.)	Report	Demir 75'	Stadium: Türk Telekom Arena; Attendance: 38,598; Referee: Barış Şimşek

25 August 2013 2	Bursaspor	1–1	Galatasaray	Bursa
21:45 EEST	Ünal 74'	Report	B. Yılmaz 44'	Stadium: Bursa Atatürk Stadium; Attendance: 23,000; Referee: Mustafa Kamil Abitoğlu

30 August 2013 3	Eskişehirspor	0–0	Galatasaray	Eskişehir
21:45 EEST		Report		Stadium: Eskişehir Atatürk Stadium; Attendance: 13,000; Referee: Cüneyt Çakır

13 September 2013 4	Galatasaray	1–1	Antalyaspor	Istanbul
20:00 EEST	Drogba 75'	Report	Tita 22'	Stadium: Türk Telekom Arena; Attendance: 46,385; Referee: Tolga Özkalfa

22 September 2013 5	Beşiktaş	0–3	Galatasaray	Istanbul
19:00 EEST		Report	Drogba 59', 72'	Stadium: Atatürk Olympic Stadium; Attendance: 76,127; Referee: Fırat Aydınus

28 September 2013 6	Galatasaray	1–1	Çaykur Rizespor	Istanbul
19:00 EEST	Baytar 19'	Report	Köse 55'	Stadium: Türk Telekom Arena; Attendance: 26,967; Referee: Ali Palabıyık

6 October 2013 7	Akhisar Belediyespor	2–1	Galatasaray	Manisa
16:30 EEST	Niasse 34', 57'	Report	Drogba 68'	Stadium: Manisa 19 Mayıs Stadium; Attendance: 14,500; Referee: Barış Şimşek

19 October 2013 8	Galatasaray	2–1	Karabükspor	Istanbul
19:00 EEST	Sneijder 41', 83'	Report	Akpala 52'	Stadium: Türk Telekom Arena; Attendance: 35,488; Referee: Barış Şimşek

27 October 2013 9	Kayserispor	2–4	Galatasaray	Kayseri
19:00 EET	Mouche 44' (pen.); Jajá 45'	Report	Sneijder 14'; Chedjou 25'; B. Yılmaz 57'; Drogba 74'	Stadium: Kadir Has Stadium; Attendance: 13,600; Referee: Cüneyt Çakır

1 November 2013 10	Galatasaray	2–1	Konyaspor	Istanbul
20:00 EET	Drogba 45+4'; B. Yılmaz 67'	Report	Aydın 16'	Stadium: Türk Telekom Arena; Attendance: 45,367; Referee: Mustafa Kamil Abitoğlu

10 November 2013 11	Fenerbahçe	2–0	Galatasaray	Istanbul
19:00 EET	Belözoğlu 23' (pen.); Cristian 66'	Report		Stadium: Şükrü Saracoğlu Stadium; Attendance: 49,950; Referee: Bülent Yıldırım

23 November 2013 12	Galatasaray	2–1	Sivasspor	Istanbul
19:00 EET	B. Yılmaz 13'; İnan 36' (pen.)	Report	Djebbour 31'	Stadium: Türk Telekom Arena; Attendance: 38,364; Referee: Halis Özkahya

1 December 2013 13	Kasımpaşa	1–1	Galatasaray	Istanbul
19:00 EET	Malki 11'	Report	B. Yılmaz 60'	Stadium: Recep Tayyip Erdoğan Stadium; Attendance: 13,500; Referee: Hüseyin Göçek

6 December 2013 14	Galatasaray	2–0	Elazığspor	Istanbul
20:00 EET	İnan 2'; B. Yılmaz 7'	Report		Stadium: Türk Telekom Arena; Attendance: 38,258; Referee: Çağatay Şahan

15 December 2013 15	Gençlerbirliği	1–1	Galatasaray	Ankara
15:30 EET	Stancu 6'	Report	Drogba 56'	Stadium: Ankara 19 Mayıs Stadium; Attendance: 15,000; Referee: Yunus Yıldırım

22 December 2013 16	Galatasaray	2–1	Trabzonspor	Istanbul
20:00 EET	B. Yılmaz 60', 68'	Report	Adın 66'	Stadium: Türk Telekom Arena; Attendance: 46,827; Referee: Fırat Aydınus

28 December 2013 17	Kayseri Erciyesspor	1–3	Galatasaray	Kayseri
19:00 EET	Öztekin 54'	Report	Sneijder 2'; B. Yılmaz 13'; Melo 34'	Stadium: Kadir Has Stadium; Attendance: 10,000; Referee: Tolga Özkalfa

26 January 2014 18	Gaziantepspor	0–0	Galatasaray	Gaziantep
19:00 EET		Report		Stadium: Kamil Ocak Stadium; Attendance: 15,500; Referee: İlker Meral

2 February 2014 19	Galatasaray	6–0	Bursaspor	Istanbul
19:00 EET	Sneijder 13', 20', 43'; Eboué 24'; Drogba 66'; İnan 88'	Report		Stadium: Türk Telekom Arena; Attendance: 49,861; Referee: Mete Kalkavan

9 February 2014 20	Galatasaray	3–0	Eskişehirspor	Istanbul
19:00 EET	B. Yılmaz 6'; Chedjou 32'; Bulut 90+1'	Report		Stadium: Türk Telekom Arena; Attendance: 47,173; Referee: Cüneyt Çakır

17 February 2014 21	Antalyaspor	2–2	Galatasaray	Antalya
20:00 EET	Tita 32'; Gülselam 45' (o.g.)	Report	B. Yılmaz 7'; Bulut 86'	Stadium: Akdeniz University Stadium; Attendance: 6,800; Referee: Halis Özkahya

22 February 2014 22	Galatasaray	1–0	Beşiktaş	Istanbul
19:00 EET	İnan 38' (pen.)	Report		Stadium: Türk Telekom Arena; Attendance: 49,194; Referee: Cüneyt Çakır

2 March 2014 23	Çaykur Rizespor	1–1	Galatasaray	Rize
19:00 EET	Kweuke 86' (pen.)	Report	Chedjou 61'	Stadium: Yeni Rize Şehir Stadı; Attendance: 15,000; Referee: Mustafa Kamil Abitoğlu

8 March 2014 24	Galatasaray	6–1	Akhisar Belediyespor	Istanbul
19:00 EET	Drogba 13', 48'; Telles 18'; B. Yılmaz 55'; Bruno Mezenga 65' (o.g.); Sneijder 73'	Report	Akyüz 59'	Stadium: Türk Telekom Arena; Attendance: 38,057; Referee: Fırat Aydınus

14 March 2014 25	Karabükspor	0–0	Galatasaray	Karabük
20:00 EET		Report		Stadium: Dr. Necmettin Şeyhoğlu Stadium; Attendance: 5,500; Referee: İlker Meral

23 March 2014 26	Galatasaray	0–1	Kayserispor	Istanbul
19:00 EET		Report	Mouche 90+5'	Stadium: Türk Telekom Arena; Attendance: 30,503; Referee: Hüseyin Göçek

19 March 2014 27	Konyaspor	0–0	Galatasaray	Konya
19:00 EEST		Report		Stadium: Konya Atatürk Stadium; Attendance: 20,500; Referee: Halis Özkahya

6 April 2014 28	Galatasaray	1–0	Fenerbahçe	Istanbul
19:00 EEST	Sneijder 9'	Report		Stadium: Türk Telekom Arena; Attendance: 51,350; Referee: Bülent Yıldırım

12 April 2014 29	Sivasspor	2–1	Galatasaray	Sivas
19:00 EEST	Chahechouhe 17'; Utaka 60'	Report	Kurtuluş 42'	Stadium: Sivas 4 Eylül Stadium; Attendance: 11,000; Referee: Mustafa Coşkun

19 April 2014 30	Galatasaray	0–4	Kasımpaşa	Istanbul
19:00 EEST		Report	Scarione 7' (pen.), 64'; Viúdez 51'; Ayhan 77'	Stadium: Türk Telekom Arena; Attendance: - Referee: Cüneyt Çakır

27 April 2014 31	Elazığspor	0–1	Galatasaray	Elazığ
19:00 EEST		Report	B. Yılmaz 24'	Stadium: Elazığ Atatürk Stadium; Attendance: 50,000; Referee: Barış Şimşek

3 May 2014 32	Galatasaray	3–2	Gençlerbirliği	Istanbul
19:00 EEST	B. Yılmaz 61'; Çalık 63' (o.g.); Bulut 90+3'	Report	Delibalta 6'; Zec 12'	Stadium: Türk Telekom Arena; Attendance: 17,842; Referee: Halis Özkahya

11 May 2014 33	Trabzonspor	1–4	Galatasaray	Trabzon
19:00 EEST	Mierzejewski 12' (pen.)	Report	Sneijder 51', 83'; İnan 56'; Bulut 73'	Stadium: Hüseyin Avni Aker Stadium; Attendance: - Referee: Fırat Aydınus

17 May 2014 34	Galatasaray	2–1	Kayseri Erciyesspor	Istanbul
19:00 EEST	B. Yılmaz 46'; Bulut 75'	Report	Mangane 81'	Stadium: Türk Telekom Arena; Attendance: - Referee: Yunus Yıldırım

=== Turkish Cup ===
3 December 2013 Fourth round	Galatasaray	2–2 (6–5 p)	Gaziantep Büyükşehir Belediyespor	Istanbul
19:00 EEST	Engin 22'; Amrabat 35'	Report	Sinan 61'; Serdar 84'	Stadium: Türk Telekom Arena; Attendance: 7.000; Referee: Mustafa Öğretmenoğlu
	Penalties
	Çolak (penalty scored); Gülselam (penalty scored); Bulut (penalty missed); Kurtuluş (penalty scored); Sarıoğlu (penalty missed); Nounkeu (penalty missed); Zan (penalty scored); Amrabat (penalty scored); Bruma (penalty scored)		Coşkun (penalty missed); Özkan (penalty missed); Halman (penalty scored); Altintepe (penalty scored); Deliktas (penalty scored); Can (penalty missed); Reşmen (penalty scored); Budak (penalty scored); Akgöl (penalty missed)

17 December 2013 Fifth round	Galatasaray	4–0	Balıkesirspor	Istanbul
18:30 EEST	Çolak 29' (pen.); Bulut 54'; Riera 69'; Bruma 90'	Report		Stadium: Atatürk Olympic Stadium; Attendance: 4.600; Referee: Deniz Bitnel

15 January 2014 Group stage	Galatasaray	2–0	Tokatspor	Istanbul
19:00 EEST	İnan 69' (pen.); Amrabat 90+1'	Report		Stadium: Türk Telekom Arena; Attendance: 15.000; Referee: Koray Gencerler

19 January 2014 Group stage	Antalyaspor	1–1	Galatasaray	Antalya
20:00 EEST	Diarra 89'	Report	İnan 44' (pen.)	Stadium: Akdeniz University; Referee: Abdulkadir Bitigen

22 January 2014 Group stage	Elazığspor	1–0	Galatasaray	Elazığ
19:00 EEST	Özkan 52' (pen.)	Report		Stadium: Elazığ Atatürk Stadium; Referee: Murat Türker

29 January 2014 Group stage	Galatasaray	3–0	Elazığspor	Istanbul
20:00 EEST	Gülselam 38'; Drogba 44'; Sarıoğlu 85'	Report		Stadium: Atatürk Olympic Stadium; Attendance: 5,250; Referee: Deniz Çoban

5 February 2014 Group stage	Tokatspor	0–3	Galatasaray	Tokat
14:00 EEST		Report	Hajrović 26'; Kurtuluş 40'; Sarı 83'	Stadium: Gaziosmanpaşa Stadium; Attendance: 5,762; Referee: Özgüç Türkalp

12 February 2014 Group stage	Galatasaray	0–0	Antalyaspor	Istanbul
20:00 EEST		Report		Stadium: Atatürk Olympic Stadium; Attendance: 4,500; Referee: Suat Arslanboğa

==== Standings ====
Pos	Team	Pld	W	D	L	GF	GA	GD	Pts
1	Antalyaspor	6	3	3	0	12	4	+8	12
2	Galatasaray	6	3	2	1	9	2	+7	11
3	Elazığspor	6	2	2	2	9	9	0	8
4	Tokatspor	6	0	1	5	4	19	−15	1

25 March 2014 Semi-finals	Galatasaray	2–2	Bursaspor	Istanbul
20:30 EEST	Sneijder 11'; İnan 44' (pen.)	Report	Şen 46'; Yılmaz 88'	Stadium: Türk Telekom Arena; Attendance: 13,500; Referee: Mustafa Kamil Abitoğlu

16 April 2014 Semi-finals	Bursaspor	2–5 (4–7 agg.)	Galatasaray	Bursa
20:00 EEST	Fernandão 28', 33'	Report	Sneijder 45'; B. Yılmaz 53', 68'; İnan 50' (pen.); Melo 71' (pen.)	Stadium: Bursa Atatürk Stadium; Referee: İlker Meral

==== Final ====
The final was contested in a neutral ground as a one-off match. The winners were awarded fifty medals per club along with the Turkish Cup trophy.

7 May 2014 Final	Galatasaray	1–0	Eskişehirspor	Konya, Turkey
20:00 EEST	Sneijder 70'	Report		Stadium: Konya Atatürk Stadium; Attendance: 22,456; Referee: Hüseyin Göçek; Man of the Match: Sneijder

=== UEFA Champions League ===
==== Group stage ====
Pos	Team	Pld	W	D	L	GF	GA	GD	Pts	Qualification	RMA	GAL	JUV	CPH
1	(Spain) Real Madrid	6	5	1	0	20	5	+15	16	Advance to knockout phase	—	4–1	2–1	4–0
2	(Turkey) Galatasaray	6	2	1	3	8	14	−6	7	Advance to knockout phase	1–6	—	1–0	3–1
3	(Italy) Juventus	6	1	3	2	9	9	0	6	Transfer to Europa League	2–2	2–2	—	3–1
4	(Denmark) Copenhagen	6	1	1	4	4	13	−9	4		0–2	1–0	1–1	—

Source: UEFA

17 September 2013 1	Galatasaray (Turkey)	1–6	(Spain) Real Madrid	Istanbul, Turkey
20:45 CEST	Bulut 84'	Report	Isco 33'; Benzema 54', 81'; Ronaldo 63', 66', 90+1'	Stadium: Türk Telekom Arena; Attendance: 47,669; Referee: Mark Clattenburg (England); Man of the Match: Cristiano Ronaldo

2 October 2013 2	Juventus (Italy)	2–2	(Turkey) Galatasaray	Turin, Italy
20:45 CEST	Vidal 78' (pen.); Quagriarella 87'	Report	Drogba 36'; Bulut 88'	Stadium: Juventus Stadium; Attendance: 33,466; Referee: Viktor Kassai (Hungary); Man of the Match: Fabio Quagliarella

23 October 2013 3	Galatasaray (Turkey)	3–1	(Denmark) Copenhagen	Istanbul, Turkey
20:45 CEST	Melo 10'; Sneijder 38'; Drogba 45+1'	Report	Claudemir 88'	Stadium: Türk Telekom Arena; Attendance: 42,798; Referee: Aleksandar Stavrev (Macedonia); Man of the Match: Emmanuel Eboué

5 November 2013 4	Copenhagen (Denmark)	1–0	(Turkey) Galatasaray	Copenhagen, Denmark
20:45 CET	Braaten 6'	Report		Stadium: Parken Stadium; Attendance: 36,204; Referee: Martin Atkinson (England)

27 November 2013 5	Real Madrid (Spain)	4–1	(Turkey) Galatasaray	Madrid, Spain
20:45 CET	Bale 37'; Arbeloa 51'; Di María 63'; Isco 81'	Report	Bulut 38'	Stadium: Santiago Bernabéu Stadium; Attendance: 67,728; Referee: William Collum (Scotland)

10 December 2013 6	Galatasaray (Turkey)	1–0	(Italy) Juventus	Istanbul, Turkey
20:45 CET	Sneijder 85'	Report		Stadium: Türk Telekom Arena; Attendance: 37,375; Referee: Pedro Proença (Portugal); Man of the Match: Drogba

==== Knockout phase ====
===== Round of 16 =====
26 February 2014 First leg	Galatasaray (Turkey)	1–1	(England) Chelsea	Istanbul, Turkey
20:45 CET	Chedjou 65'	Report	Torres 9'	Stadium: Türk Telekom Arena; Attendance: 49,194; Referee: Carlos Velasco Carballo (Spain)

18 March 2014 Second leg	Chelsea (England)	2–0 (3–1 agg.)	(Turkey) Galatasaray	London, England
20:45 CET	Eto'o 4'; Cahill 42'	Report		Stadium: Stamford Bridge; Attendance: 38.038; Referee: Felix Brych (Germany)

== Statistics ==
=== Squad statistics ===
No.	Pos.	Player	League		Turkish Cup		Super Cup		Champions League		Total		Discipline		Minutes
No.	Pos.	Player	Apps	Goals	Apps	Goals	Apps	Goals	Apps	Goals	Apps	Goals	Yellow card	Red card	Total
25	GK	(Uruguay) Fernando Muslera	29	0	3	0	1	0	6	0	39	0	4	0	3514
67	GK	(Turkey) Eray İşcan	4	0	1	0	0	0	2	0	7	0	1	0	630
86	GK	(Turkey) Ufuk Ceylan	2	0	5	0	0	0	0	0	7	0	0	0	584
82	GK	(Turkey) Aykut Erçetin	0	0	3	0	0	0	0	0	3	0	0	0	192
5	DF	(Turkey) Gökhan Zan	10	0	1	0	1	0	3	0	15	0	4	0	1102
13	DF	(Cameroon) Dany Nounkeu	6	0	3	0	0	0	3	0	12	0	2	1	964
28	DF	(Turkey) Koray Günter	4	0	3	0	0	0	0	0	7	0	0	0	206
21	DF	(Cameroon) Aurélien Chedjou	21	3	4	0	0	0	8	0	33	3	5	0	2801
22	DF	(Turkey) Hakan Balta	24	0	9	0	1	0	3	0	37	0	5	1	2967
15	DF	(Brazil) Alex Telles	15	1	4	0	0	0	2	0	21	1	1	0	1700
2	DF	(Argentina) Guillermo Burdisso	1	0	3	0	0	0	0	0	4	0	2	0	248
88	DF	(Turkey) Veysel Sarı	9	0	2	1	0	0	0	0	11	1	2	0	707
26	DF	(Turkey) Semih Kaya	29	0	5	0	1	0	6	0	41	0	3	0	3485
27	DF	(Ivory Coast) Emmanuel Eboué	18	1	3	0	1	0	8	0	30	1	1	0	2584
66	DF	(Turkey) Salih Dursun	2	0	4	0	0	0	0	0	6	0	1	0	361
4	MF	(Turkey) Hamit Altıntop	5	0	2	0	1	0	0	0	8	0	2	0	268
6	MF	(Turkey) Ceyhun Gülselam	20	0	7	1	0	0	4	0	31	1	5	0	1496
8	MF	(Turkey) Selçuk İnan	31	5	5	4	1	0	8	0	45	9	13	1	3951
3	MF	(Brazil) Felipe Melo	30	1	8	0	1	0	8	1	47	2	14	2	4092
77	MF	(Spain) Albert Riera	4	0	4	1	0	0	5	0	13	1	4	0	1026
52	MF	(Turkey) Emre Çolak	15	0	7	1	1	0	0	0	23	1	0	0	1121
39	MF	(Turkey) Yiğit Gökoğlan	0	0	1	0	0	0	0	0	1	0	0	0	5
90	MF	(Turkey) Umut Gündoğan	1	0	4	0	0	0	0	0	5	0	0	0	185
7	MF	(Turkey) Aydın Yılmaz	6	0	4	0	0	0	1	0	11	0	2	0	389
55	MF	(Turkey) Sabri Sarıoğlu	24	0	6	1	0	0	0	0	30	1	4	0	2106
50	MF	(Turkey) Engin Baytar	7	1	1	1	0	0	1	0	9	2	1	0	445
35	MF	(Turkey) Yekta Kurtuluş	17	1	9	1	0	0	2	0	28	2	4	0	2050
32	MF	(Turkey) İbrahim Coşkun	0	0	1	0	0	0	0	0	1	0	1	0	3
24	MF	(Turkey) Erman Kılıç	2	0	0	0	1	0	0	0	3	0	1	0	64
45	MF	(Turkey) Oğuzhan Kayar	0	0	1	0	0	0	0	0	1	0	0	0	90
20	MF	(Portugal) Bruma	7	0	3	1	0	0	5	0	15	1	0	0	1017
53	MF	(Morocco) Nordin Amrabat	4	0	3	2	1	0	5	0	13	2	2	0	657
10	MF	(Netherlands) Wesley Sneijder	28	12	6	3	1	0	7	2	42	17	7	0	3366
14	MF	(Bosnia and Herzegovina) Izet Hajrović	8	0	2	1	0	0	2	0	12	1	1	0	527
94	MF	(Argentina) Lucas Ontivero	3	0	2	0	0	0	0	0	5	0	1	0	209
41	FW	(Turkey) Berk İsmail Ünsal	3	0	2	0	0	0	0	0	5	0	0	0	189
17	FW	(Turkey) Burak Yılmaz	32	16	6	2	0	0	6	0	44	18	4	2	3676
19	FW	(Turkey) Umut Bulut	27	4	10	1	1	0	8	3	46	8	4	0	1946
11	FW	(Ivory Coast) Didier Drogba	24	10	3	1	1	1	8	2	36	14	6	0	2957
–	–	Own goals	–	1	–	0	–	0	–	0	–	1	–	–	–

Statistics accurate as of 17 May 2014.

=== Goals ===
Includes all competitive matches.

Last updated on 17 May 2014

Position	Nation	Number	Player	Süper Lig	Champions League	Turkish Cup	Super Cup	Total
1	(Turkey)	17	Burak Yılmaz	16	0	2	0	18
2	(Netherlands)	10	Wesley Sneijder	12	2	3	0	17
3	(Ivory Coast)	11	Didier Drogba	10	2	1	1	14
4	(Turkey)	8	Selçuk İnan	5	0	4	0	9
4	(Turkey)	19	Umut Bulut	5	3	1	0	9
5	(Cameroon)	21	Aurélien Chedjou	3	1	0	0	4
6	(Brazil)	3	Felipe Melo	1	1	1	0	3
7	(Turkey)	50	Engin Baytar	1	0	1	0	2
7	(Turkey)	35	Yekta Kurtuluş	1	0	1	0	2
7	(Morocco)	53	Nordin Amrabat	0	0	2	0	2
8	(Brazil)	15	Alex Telles	1	0	0	0	1
8	(Ivory Coast)	27	Emmanuel Eboué	1	0	0	0	1
8	(Turkey)	52	Emre Çolak	0	0	1	0	1
8	(Turkey)	6	Ceyhun Gülselam	0	0	1	0	1
8	(Turkey)	55	Sabri Sarıoğlu	0	0	1	0	1
8	(Spain)	77	Albert Riera	0	0	1	0	1
8	(Portugal)	20	Bruma	0	0	1	0	1
8	(Bosnia and Herzegovina)	14	Izet Hajrović	0	0	1	0	1
8	(Turkey)	88	Veysel Sarı	0	0	1	0	1
9			Own Goals	3	0	0	0	3
			TOTALS	59	9	23	1	92

=== Disciplinary record ===
N	Pos.	Nat.	Name	Yellow card	Second yellow card	Red card	Notes
25	GK	(Uruguay)	Fernando Muslera	4			
67	GK	(Turkey)	Eray İşcan	1			
86	GK	(Turkey)	Ufuk Ceylan				
21	DF	(Cameroon)	Aurélien Chedjou	5			
5	DF	(Turkey)	Gökhan Zan	4			
13	DF	(Cameroon)	Dany Nounkeu	1	1	1	
28	DF	(Turkey)	Koray Günter				
22	DF	(Turkey)	Hakan Balta	5		1	
15	DF	(Brazil)	Alex Telles	1			
2	DF	(Argentina)	Guillermo Burdisso	2			
88	DF	(Turkey)	Veysel Sarı	2			
26	DF	(Turkey)	Semih Kaya	3			
27	DF	(Ivory Coast)	Emmanuel Eboué	1			
66	DF	(Turkey)	Salih Dursun	1			
4	MF	(Turkey)	Hamit Altıntop	2			
8	MF	(Turkey)	Selçuk İnan	10	1		
6	MF	(Turkey)	Ceyhun Gülselam	6			
3	MF	(Brazil)	Felipe Melo	14	1	1	
77	MF	(Spain)	Albert Riera	4			
7	MF	(Turkey)	Aydın Yılmaz	2			
32	MF	(Turkey)	İbrahim Coşkun	1			
90	MF	(Turkey)	Umut Gündoğan				
10	MF	(Netherlands)	Wesley Sneijder	7			
35	MF	(Turkey)	Yekta Kurtuluş	4			
39	MF	(Turkey)	Yiğit Gökoğlan				
50	MF	(Turkey)	Engin Baytar	1			
52	MF	(Turkey)	Emre Çolak				
55	MF	(Turkey)	Sabri Sarıoğlu	4			
53	MF	(Morocco)	Nordin Amrabat	2			
20	MF	(Portugal)	Bruma				
14	MF	(Bosnia and Herzegovina)	Izet Hajrović	1			
45	MF	(Turkey)	Oğuzhan Kayar				
94	MF	(Argentina)	Lucas Ontivero	1			
19	FW	(Turkey)	Umut Bulut	4			
17	FW	(Turkey)	Burak Yılmaz	6	1	1	
11	FW	(Ivory Coast)	Didier Drogba	6			

Last updated: 17 May 2014
Source: http://www.ntvspor.net/istatistik
Only competitive matches
(yellow card) = Number of bookings; (second yellow card) = Number of sending offs after a second yellow card; (red card) = Number of sending offs by a direct red card.

=== Overall ===
	Total	Home	Away	Neutral
Games played	54	27	25	2
Games won	28	19	7	2
Games drawn	16	5	11	0
Games lost	10	3	7	0
Biggest win	6–0 vs Bursaspor	6–0 vs Bursaspor	5–2 vs Bursaspor	1–0 vs Fenerbahçe; 1–0 vs Eskişehirspor
Biggest loss	6–1 vs Real Madrid	6–1 vs Real Madrid	4–1 vs Real Madrid	–
Biggest win (League)	6–0 vs Bursaspor	6–0 vs Bursaspor	3–0 vs Beşiktaş	–
Biggest win (Cup)	4–0 vs Balıkesirspor	4–0 vs Balıkesirspor	5–2 vs Bursaspor	1–0 vs Eskişehirspor
Biggest win (UEFA)	3–1 vs Copenhagen	3–1 vs Copenhagen	–	–
Biggest win (Super Cup)	1–0 vs Fenerbahçe	–	–	1–0 vs Fenerbahçe
Biggest loss (League)	2–0 vs Fenerbahçe	4–0 vs Kasımpaşa	2–0 vs Fenerbahçe	–
Biggest loss (Cup)	1–0 vs Elazığspor	–	1–0 vs Elazığspor	–
Biggest loss (UEFA)	6–1 vs Real Madrid	6–1 vs Real Madrid	4–1 vs Real Madrid	–
Biggest loss (Super Cup)	–	–	–	–
Clean sheets	19	10	7	2
Goals scored	92	55	35	2
Goals conceded	57	28	29	0
Goal difference	+35	+27	+6	+2
Average GF per game	1.7	2.04	1.4	1
Average GA per game	1.06	1.04	1.16	0
Yellow cards	108	–		
Red cards	7	–		
Most appearances	(Brazil) Felipe Melo (47)	–		
Most minutes played	(Brazil) Felipe Melo (4092)	–		
Most goals	(Turkey) Burak Yılmaz (18)	–		
Most assists	(Turkey) Burak Yılmaz (Turkey) Selçuk İnan (10)	–		
Points	100	62	32	6
Winning rate	51.85%	70.37%	28%	100%

=== Attendance ===
Competition	Avg. Att.	Total Att.
Süper Lig	40,094	641,505
Turkish Cup	8,308	49,850
Champions League	44,259	177,036
Total	37,132	854,041

- Sold season tickets: Stopped at 46,250. Demand was 165,000.

== See also ==
- 2013–14 Süper Lig
- 2013–14 Turkish Cup
- 2013–14 UEFA Champions League

== Sources ==
- Ciullini, Pablo (10 September 2015). "Emirates Cup 2013". Rec.Sport.Soccer Statistics Foundation (RSSSF). Archived from the original on 16 September 2016.
