= 2013–14 Turkish Cup =

2013–14 Türkiye Kupası
Ziraat Türkiye Kupası

Tournament details
- Country: Turkey
- Dates: 1 September 2013– 7 May 2014
- Teams: 158

Final positions
- Champions: Galatasaray
- Runners-up: Eskişehirspor

Tournament statistics
- Matches played: 179
- Goals scored: 435 (2.43 per match)
- Top goal scorer(s): (Turkey) Hakan Arslan (6 goals)

The 2013–14 Turkish Cup (Turkish: Türkiye Kupası) is the 52nd season of the Turkish Cup. Ziraat Bankası is the sponsor of the tournament, thus the sponsored name is Ziraat Turkish Cup. The winners earn a berth in the play-off round of the 2014–15 UEFA Europa League. Fenerbahçe were the defending champions, but were eliminated in the fourth round. The winners will also qualify for the 2014 Turkish Super Cup.

== Round and draw dates ==
Round	Draw date	Match date(s)	New entries	Fixtures	Clubs	Entering leagues
Preliminary round	15 August 2013	1 September 2013	10	5	158 → 153	Turkish Regional Amateur League
First round	4 September 2013	11–12 September 2013	75	40	153 → 113	TFF Third League & Turkish Regional Amateur League
Second round	17 September 2013	24 September–3 October 2013	68	54	113 → 59	Süper Lig & TFF First League & TFF Second League
Third round	8 October 2013	29 October–6 November 2013	–	27	59 → 32	–
Fourth round	11 November 2013	3–5 December 2013	5	16	32 → 16	Süper Lig
Fifth round	6 December 2013	17–19 December 2013	–	8	16 → 8	–
Group stage	25 December 2013	14 January–13 February 2014	–	24	8 → 4	–
Semi-finals	25 December 2013	25 March–17 April 2014	–	4	4 → 2	–
Final	25 December 2013	7 May 2014	–	1	2 → 1	–

== Preliminary round ==
Teams from the Regional Amateur League competed in this round for a place in the first round. All matches were played on 1 September 2013.

Team 1	Score	Team 2
Karaman Belediyespor (5)	1–0	Kilis Belediyespor (5)
Tatvan Gençlerbirliği Spor (5)	1–0	Dersim Spor (5)
Yüksekova Belediyespor (5)	1–2	Cizre Basra Spor (5)
Patnos Gençlik Spor (5)	0–3	Iğdir Gençlerbirliğispor (5)
Göle Belediyespor (5)	1–0	Kars Spor Kulübu (5)

== First round ==
The five winners from the preliminary round, teams from the Regional Amateur League and teams from the 3. Lig competed in this stage to earn a place in the second round. Matches were played on 11 and 12 September 2013.

Team 1	Score	Team 2
Beylerbeyi Spor Kulübü (4)	2–1	Üsküdar Anadolu (4)
Edirnespor (5)	3–0	Tekirdağspor (5)
Tuzlaspor (4)	1–2 (a.e.t.)	Fatih Karagümrükspor (4)
Sancaktepe Belediye (4)	1–2	İstanbulspor (4)
Çiksalin Spor Kulübü (4)	2–1	Istanbul Maltepespor (4)
Ümraniyespor (4)	0–1	Silivrispor (4)
Beyköy Belediyespor (5)	3–4	Gölcük Spor Kulübü (4)
Darica Gençlerbirliği (4)	1–1 (3–5p)	Kocaelispor (4)
Derince Belediyespor (4)	2–0	Sakaryaspor (4)
Bursa Nilüfer Sportif (4)	0–2	Orhangazispor Bursa (4)
Armutlu Belediyespor (5)	0–1	Yeşil Bursa (5)
Manavgat Evrenseki Spor Kulübü (4)	4–2 (a.e.t.)	Tekirova Belediye Spor Kulübü (4)
Keçiörengücü (4)	5–0	Kırıkkalespor (5)
Ankara Adliye Spor Kulübü (4)	0–3	Hacettepe (4)
Zonguldakspor (5)	0–0 (3–4p)	Bartinspor (5)
Tosya Belediyespor (5)	3–2	Ayancik Belediyespor (5)
Merzifonspor (5)	1–3	Bafraspor (4)
Nevşehirspor Gençlik (5)	2–1 (a.e.t.)	Sivas Eylül Belediyespor (4)
Kirşehir Köy Hizmetleri (5)	1–0	Yimpaş Yozgatspor (4)
Yeni Aksarayspor Kulübü (4)	1–2	Niğde Belediyespor (5)
Karaman Belediyespor (5)	2–0	Şekerspor (4)
Trabzon Akçaabat Kulübü (5)	4–1	Arhavispor (5)
Trabzon Düzyurtspor (4)	1–2	Arsinspor (4)
Bayburt Grup İl Özel İdare (5)	2–0	Iğdır Gençlerbirliğispor (5)
Göle Belediyespor (5)	0–3	Erzurum Büyükşehir Belediyespor (4)
Belediye Bingölspor Kulübü (4)	0–0 (3–4p)	Elazığ Belediyespor (4)
Cizre Basra Spor (5)	1–2	Tatvan Gençlerbirliği Spor (5)
Belediye Vanspor (4)	1–0	Siirtspor (4)
Batman Petrolspor (4)	3–0	Girmeli Belediyespor (5)
Yeni Diyarbakirspor (5)	4–1	Adıyamanspor (4)
Ankara Demirspor (4)	1–0	Beypazari Şekerspor (4)
Çorum Belediye Spor Kulübü (4)	2–1	Ünyespor (4)
Bergama Belediyespor (4)	2–1	Balçova Belediyespor (4)
Menemen Belediyespor Kulübü (4)	3–1	Ayvalıkgücü Belediyespor (4)
Ispartaspor (5)	0–5	Bucak Belediyesi Oğuzhanspor (5)
Kizilcabölük Spor Kulübü (4)	1–0 (a.e.t.)	Sandiklispor (4)
Uşak Sportif Gençlikspor (5)	3–3 (5–4p)	Denizli Belediye Spor Kulübü (4)
Kırıkhanspor (4)	1–2	Kahramanmaraş Belediyespor (4)
Osmaniyespor (5)	0–0 (4–2p)	Payas Belediyespor (4)
Muş Ovasıspor (5)	1–8	Erzincan Refahiye Spor Kulübü (4)

== Second round ==
The forty winners from the first round, 36 teams from the 2. Lig, 19 teams from the 1. Lig and 13 teams from the Süper Lig competed in this stage to earn a place in the third round. Matches were played between 24 September & 3 October 2013.

Team 1	Score	Team 2
1461 Trabzon (2)	2–0	Beylerbeyi (4)
Yeni Diyarbakırspor (5)	0–0 (3–4p)	Altay (3)
Hacettepe (4)	1–0	Yeni Malatyaspor (3)
Orhangazispor (4)	2–4	Akhisar Belediyespor (1)
Kartalspor (3)	4–2	Erzincanspor (5)
Körfez (3)	1–2 (a.e.t.)	Medical Park Antalyaspor (1)
TKİ Tavşanlı Linyitspor (2)	0–0 (6–5p)	Dardanel (3)
Gaziantepspor (1)	3–2 (a.e.t.)	Çorum Belediyespor (4)
Göztepe (3)	2–2 (5–6p)	Altınordu (3)
Kardemir Karabükspor (1)	6–0	Kocaelispor (4)
Belediye Vanspor (4)	2–0	Manisaspor (2)
Diyarbakırspor (3)	1–1 (5–6p)	İskenderun DÇ (3)
Erzurum BŞB (4)	2–2 (4–5p)	Adanaspor (2)
Kahramanmaraşspor (2)	3–0	Tosya Belediyespor (5)
Şanlıurfaspor (2)	0–1	Giresunspor (3)
Tokatspor (3)	2–0	Uşak Sportif Gençlikspor (5)
Menemen Belediyespor (4)	0–1 (a.e.t.)	Nazilli Belediyespor (3)
İnegölspor (3)	3–1	Nevşehir Gençlikspor (5)
Ankaragücü (3)	2–1	Karaman Belediyespor (5)
Gaziosmanpaşaspor (3)	0–1	Alanyaspor (3)
Derince Belediyespor (4)	0–4	Anadolu Selçukluspor (3)
Bayrampaşaspor (3)	3–1	Kirşehir Köy Hizmetleri (5)
Kızılcahamamspor (3)	0–1	Oyak Renaultspor (4)
Pendikspor (3)	1–0	Bayburt Grup İl Özel İdare Gençlikspor (5)
Sarıyer (3)	1–2	Gençlerbirliği (1)
Çankırı Belediyespor (3)	1–0	Elazığ Belediyespor (4)
Tepecikspor (3)	0–1	Silivrispor (4)
Osmaniyespor 2011 (5)	0–2	Hatayspor (3)
Turgutluspor (3)	2–0	Kırklarelispor (3)
Bergama Belediyespor (4)	2–1	Polatlı Bugsaşspor (3)
İstanbul Güngörenspor (3)	1–2 (a.e.t.)	Tarsus İY (3)
Keçiörengücü (4)	1–2	Bandırmaspor (3)
Boluspor (2)	3–2 (a.e.t.)	Batman Petrolspor (4)
Kayseri Erciyesspor (1)	2–0	Edirnespor (5)
Karşıyaka (2)	2–1	Ofspor (3)
Fethiyespor (2)	3–1	Kızılcabölükspor (4)
Elazığspor (1)	2–0	Ankara Demirspor (4)
Eskişehirspor (1)	7–0	Çiksalinspor (4)
Trabzon Akçaabat Futbol Kulübü (5)	1–3	Gaziantep B.B. (2)
Arsinspor (4)	0–3	Konyaspor (1)
Bucaspor (2)	1–0	Eyüpspor (3)
Kayserispor (1)	2–1	Pazarspor (3)
İstanbulspor (4)	0–1	Çaykur Rizespor (1)
Kahramanmaraş Belediyespor (4)	2–1	Ankaraspor (2)
Tatvan Gençlerbirliği Spor (5)	3–1	Bozüyükspor (3)
Bafraspor (4)	0–1	Adana Demirspor (2)
Bartinspor (5)	1–7	Balıkesirspor (2)
Denizlispor (2)	1–2	Manavgat Evrenseki Spor Kulübü (4)
Niğde Belediyespor (5)	3–1	Mersin İY (2)
Gölcükspor (4)	0–0 (4–5p)	Orduspor (2)
İstanbul BBSK (2)	5–0	Gümüşhanespor (3)
Aydınspor 1923 (3)	3–2 (a.e.t.)	Samsunspor (2)
Sivasspor (1)	5–0	Bucak Belediyesi Oğuzhanspor (5)
Fatih Karagümrükspor (4)	2–3	Kasımpaşa (1)

== Third round ==
54 teams competed in the third round. Matches were played on the first team's home ground on 29, 30, 31 October and 6 November.

29 October 2013	1461 Trabzon (2)	2–1	Altay (3)	Hüseyin Avni Aker Stadium, Trabzon
13:00	Memiş 45', 69'		Kuzey 66'

29 October 2013	Çankırıspor (3)	1–0	Adanaspor (2)	Çankırı Atatürk Stadium, Çankırı
13:30	Özkaynak 22' (o.g.)

29 October 2013	Elazığspor (1)	3–1	Pendikspor (3)	Elazığ Atatürk Stadium, Elazığ
18:00	Yedek 46'; Öz 60', 70'		Erdogan 65'

29 October 2013	Sivasspor (1)	3–1 (a.e.t.)	MKE Ankaragücü (3)	Sivas 4 Eylül Stadium, Sivas
20:30	Arslan 88'; Toscalı 107' (o.g.); Djebbour 120'		Taşdemir 71'

30 October 2013	Tatvan Gençlerbirliği (5)	0–1	İstanbul B.B. (2)	Tatvan İlçe Sahası, Tatvan
13:00			Sarp 77'

30 October 2013	Belediye Vanspor (4)	1–0 (a.e.t.)	Karşıyaka (2)	Van Atatürk Stadı, Van
13:00	Öndil 101'

30 October 2013	Niğde Belediyespor (5)	1–2	Adana Demirspor (2)	Niğde
13:30	Ateş 88'		Keskin 6'; Juninho 83'

30 October 2013	Nazilli Belediyespor (3)	1–0	Orduspor (2)	Nazilli Şehir Stadium, Nazilli
13:30	Çelik 90'

30 October 2013	Bandırmaspor (3)	3–0 (a.e.t.)	Kahramanmaraşspor (2)	17 Eylül Stadium, Bandırma
13:30	Bilgen 105'; Bingöl 108'; Kuru 119'

30 October 2013	Tokatspor (3)	1–0 (a.e.t.)	Boluspor (2)	Tokat Gaziosmanpaşa Stadium, Tokat
13:30	Doğan 99'

30 October 2013	Kartalspor (3)	1–2 (a.e.t.)	Silivrispor (4)	Kartal Stadium, Istanbul
13:30	Abdioğlu 116'		Gürsoy 102' (pen.), 105'

30 October 2013	İskenderun Demir Çelikspor (3)	0–0 (a.e.t.) (3–4 p)	TKİ Tavşanlı Linyitspor (2)	5 Temmuz Stadium, İskenderun
13:30
	Penalties
	Pitir (penalty scored); Demiral (penalty scored); Yeniler (penalty scored)		Agbetu (penalty scored); Batuhan (penalty scored); Özdemir (penalty scored); Gideon (penalty scored)

30 October 2013	Anadolu Selçukluspor (3)	0–2	Balıkesirspor (2)	Recep Konuk Sports Facilities, Konya
14:00			Al 27' (pen.); Çalık 74'

30 October 2013	Turgutluspor (3)	2–3	Antalyaspor (1)	7 Eylül Stadium, Turgutlu
14:00	Erisci 15'; Başoda 45'		Başsan 45'; Baroš 75', 90'

30 October 2013	Kayseri Erciyesspor (1)	2–1	Giresunspor (3)	Kadir Has Stadium, Kayseri
15:30	Çürüksu 67'; Öztekin 90'		Tut 47'

30 October 2013	Gaziantep B.B. (2)	6–5	Altınordu (3)	Gaziantep Kamil Ocak Stadium, Gaziantep
18:00	Güntensperger 32'; Kol 38'; Konan 41', 55'; Deliktaş 78'; Özkan 83'		Kocatepe 67'; Yılmaz 73'; Karadeniz 78'; Gümüşsu 85'; Tuna 90'

30 October 2013	Akhisar Belediyespor (1)	4–1	Yeşil Bursa (4)	Manisa 19 Mayıs Stadium, Manisa
18:00	Riedle 25'; Sesar 30'; Özer 45', 61'		Şeflek 69'

30 October 2013	Bucaspor (2)	1–0 (a.e.t.)	Aydınspor 1923 (3)	Buca Arena, İzmir
18:00	Ricketts 120'

30 October 2013	Karabükspor (1)	3–2	Manavgat Evrensekispor (4)	Dr. Necmettin Şeyhoğlu Stadium, Karabük
18:00	Akpala 47', 72'; LuaLua 62'		Tekin 11', 65'

30 October 2013	Fethiyespor (2)	2–1 (a.e.t.)	Bayrampaşaspor (3)	Fethiye Şehir Stadium, Fethiye
18:00	Akcakin 57'; Okan 115'		Kilinc 17'

30 October 2013	Çaykur Rizespor (1)	0–0 (a.e.t.) (3–4 p)	Tarsus İdman Yurdu (3)	Yeni Rize Şehir Stadı, Rize
18:00

30 October 2013	Eskişehirspor (1)	2–0	Alanyaspor (3)	Eskişehir Atatürk Stadium, Eskişehir
20:30	Ângelo 62'; Ateş 78'

31 October 2013	Bergama Belediyespor (4)	1–2	Gençlerbirliği (1)	Bergama
14:00	Uzun 17'		Kulušić 57', 90'

31 October 2013	Kayserispor (1)	2–0	Kahramanmaraş B.B. (4)	Kadir Has Stadium, Kayseri
18:00	Nobre 42'; Diop 86'

31 October 2013	Gaziantepspor (1)	1–0 (a.e.t.)	Hatayspor (3)	Gaziantep Kamil Ocak Stadium, Gaziantep
20:00	Durak 109'

6 November 2013	Hacettepe (4)	3–2	Torku Konyaspor (1)	Cebeci İnönü Stadium, Ankara
13:30	Öztürk 26'; Çolak 71'; Tosun 90+2'		Camdali 81'; Aydin 83'

6 November 2013	İnegölspor (3)	1–0	Kasımpaşa (1)	İnegöl Stadium, Bursa
13:30	Gunay 81'

== Fourth round ==
5 teams from Süper Lig, that are playing in European competitions (namely, Galatasaray, Fenerbahçe, Beşiktaş, Trabzonspor, and Bursaspor joined 27 winners from third round. 32 teams competed for the fifth round and a seeding procedure was underway for the draw. Matches were played on the first team's home ground. 16 teams advanced to the fifth round.

3 December 2013	Bandırmaspor (3)	0–2	Elazığspor (1)	17 Eylül Stadium, Bandırma
13:00		Report	Doğan 22'; Koçak 74' (o.g.)	Attendance: 950; Referee: Mustafa Aydın

3 December 2013	Galatasaray (1)	2–2 (a.e.t.) (6–5 p)	Gaziantep B.B. (2)	Türk Telekom Arena, Istanbul
19:00	Baytar 22'; Amrabat 35'	Report	Özkan 61'; Deliktaş 84'	Attendance: 7000; Referee: Mustafa Öğretmenoğlu
	Penalties
	Çolak (penalty scored); Gülselam (penalty scored); Bulut (penalty missed); Kurtuluş (penalty scored); Sarıoğlu (penalty missed); Nounkeu (penalty missed); Zan (penalty scored); Amrabat (penalty scored); Bruma (penalty scored)		Coşkun (penalty missed); Özkan (penalty missed); Halman (penalty scored); Altintepe (penalty scored); Deliktaş (penalty scored); Can (penalty missed); Reşmen (penalty scored); Budak (penalty scored); Akgöl (penalty missed)

3 December 2013	Antalyaspor (1)	4–2 (a.e.t.)	Çankırıspor (3)	Akdeniz University Stadium, Antalya
20:30	Diarra 55', 95'; Çakmakçı 61' (o.g.); Vederson 114'	Report	Solak 7'; Çakay 46'	Attendance: 7000; Referee: Murat Türker

4 December 2013	İnegölspor (3)	3–2	Gaziantepspor (1)	İnegöl Stadium, Bursa
13:00	Hastürk 55', 70'; Demir 90'	Report	Tosun 66'; Şahin 82'	Attendance: 4500; Referee: Serkan Tokat

4 December 2013	Balıkesirspor (2)	3–1	Trabzonspor (1)	Balıkesir Atatürk Stadı, Balıkesir
13:00	Karikari 5'; Reis 9'; Hatipoğlu 34'	Report	Janko 19'	Attendance: 14.500; Referee: Özgüç Türkalp

4 December 2013	TKİ Tavşanlı Linyitspor (2)	0–1	Akhisar Belediyespor (1)	Dumlupınar Stadium, Tavşanlı
13:00		Report	Guaycochea 30'	Attendance: 1500; Referee: Ferhan Kestanlıoğlu

4 December 2013	Tokatspor (3)	1–0	İstanbul B.B. (2)	Tokat Gaziosmanpaşa Stadium, Tokat
13:00	Kuzu 51'	Report		Attendance: 3000; Referee: Erkan Engin

4 December 2013	Sivasspor (1)	1–0	Silivrispor (4)	Sivas 4 Eylül Stadium, Sivas
17:00	Grosicki 18'	Report		Attendance: 550; Referee: Hüseyin Sabancı

4 December 2013	Gençlerbirliği (1)	0–1	Nazilli Belediyespor (3)	19 Mayıs Stadyumu, Ankara
18:00		Report	Behram 60'	Attendance: 300; Referee: Abdulkadir Bitigen

4 December 2013	Fenerbahçe (1)	1–2	Fethiyespor (2)	Şükrü Saracoğlu Stadium, Istanbul
19:00	Turgut 45+1' (o.g.)	Report	Okan 77'; Aras 83'	Attendance: 6250; Referee: Kutluhan Bilgiç

4 December 2013	Adana Demirspor (2)	1–2	Bursaspor (1)	Adana 5 Ocak Stadium, Adana
21:00	Rostand 44'	Report	Kiraz 10'; Kazım 25'	Attendance: 7200; Referee: Koray Gençerler

5 December 2013	Tarsus İdman Yurdu (3)	2–4	Kayseri Erciyesspor (1)	Tarsus Stadium, Tarsus
13:00	Cengiz 30'; Erarslan 35'	Report	Ibričić 37' (pen.), 57' (pen.), 72'; Mangane 45'	Attendance: 700; Referee: Hakan Ceylan

5 December 2013	Eskişehirspor (1)	4–1	Belediye Vanspor (4)	Eskişehir Atatürk Stadium, Eskişehir
15:30	Bienvenu 9', 65'; Coşkun 12'; Kara 42'	Report	Çift 85'	Referee: Deniz Ateş Bitnel

5 December 2013	Karabükspor (1)	3–1	Hacettepe (4)	Dr. Necmettin Şeyhoğlu Stadium, Karabük
18:00	Parlak 22' (pen.); Juju 65'; Özçal 69'	Report	Tosun 36'	Referee: Özkan Çeliker

5 December 2013	Kayserispor (1)	1–0	1461 Trabzon (2)	Kadir Has Stadium, Kayseri
18:00	Bobô 70'	Report		Referee: Alper Ulusoy

5 December 2013	Bucaspor (2)	2–1	Beşiktaş (1)	İzmir Atatürk Stadium, İzmir
20:30	Gündoğan 41'; Ricketts 78'		Şişmanoğlu 65'	Referee: Suat Arslanboğa

== Fifth round ==
16 winners of the fourth round played against each other for the last 8 spots for the group stage.

17 December 2013 Fifth round	Karabükspor (1)	1–1 (a.e.t.) (2–4 p)	Elazığspor (1)	Karabük, Turkey
19:00 EET (UTC+02)	Sow 89' (o.g.)	Report (in Turkish)	Özkan 74' (o.g.)	Stadium: Dr. Necmettin Şeyhoğlu Stadium; Attendance: 1000; Referee: Özgüç Türkalp
	Penalties
	Parlak (penalty missed); Özek (penalty missed); Özgenç (penalty scored); Özkan (penalty scored)		Gürler (penalty scored); Moore (penalty scored); Sow (penalty scored); Yedek (penalty scored)

18 December 2013 Fifth round	Tokatspor (3)	1–0	Kayserispor (1)	Tokat, Turkey
13:00 EET (UTC+02)	Yaşar 19'	Report (in Turkish)		Stadium: Tokat Gaziosmanpaşa Stadium; Attendance: 2000; Referee: Murat Türker

18 December 2013 Fifth round	Eskişehirspor (1)	3–0	Fethiyespor (2)	Eskişehir, Turkey
16:00 EET (UTC+02)	N'Diaye 48'; Čaušić 51'; Kamara 90'	Report (in Turkish)		Stadium: Eskişehir Atatürk Stadium; Attendance: 2500; Referee: Abdullah Yılmaz

18 December 2013 Fifth round	Galatasaray (1)	4–0	Balıkesirspor (2)	Istanbul, Turkey
18:30 EET (UTC+02)	Çolak 29' (pen.); Bulut 54'; Riera 69'; Bruma 90'	Report (in Turkish)		Stadium: Atatürk Olympic Stadium; Attendance: 4600; Referee: Deniz Ateş Bitnel

18 December 2013 Fifth round	Bucaspor (2)	0–1 (a.e.t.)	Antalyaspor (1)	İzmir, Turkey
20:30 EET (UTC+02)		Report (in Turkish)	Güngör 103'	Stadium: Buca Arena; Attendance: 3100; Referee: Murat Özcan

19 December 2013 Fifth round	Sivasspor (1)	2–1 (a.e.t.)	Nazilli Belediyespor (3)	Sivas, Turkey
14:30 EET (UTC+02)	Arslan 93'; Cicinho 114'	Report (in Turkish)	Çelik 101'	Stadium: Sivas 4 Eylül Stadium; Attendance: 3000; Referee: Koray Gençerler

19 December 2013 Fifth round	Kayseri Erciyesspor (1)	0–1	Akhisar Belediyespor (1)	Kayseri, Turkey
17:00 EET (UTC+02)		Report (in Turkish)	Demirok 10' (pen.)	Stadium: Kadir Has Stadium; Attendance: 1500; Referee: Volkan Bayarslan

19 December 2013 Fifth round	Bursaspor (1)	3–0	İnegölspor (3)	Bursa, Turkey
20:00 EET (UTC+02)	Yıldırım 61'; Ünal 83', 86'	Report (in Turkish)		Stadium: Bursa Atatürk Stadium; Attendance: 15.000; Referee: Hakan Ceylan

== Group stage ==
8 winners from the fifth and the last qualifying round were split into two groups of 4 teams. This stage will be a round-robin tournament with home and away matches, in the vein of UEFA European competitions' group stages. The winners and runners-up of the two groups will advance to the semi-finals.

=== Group A ===
Pos	Team	Pld	W	D	L	GF	GA	GD	Pts	BUR	ESK	AKB	SİV
1	Bursaspor	6	4	1	1	11	4	+7	13		4–1	1–0	2–1
2	Eskişehirspor	6	3	1	2	6	7	−1	10	1–0		0–2	0–0
3	Akhisar Belediyespor	6	2	2	2	5	6	−1	8	0–0	1–1		1–0
4	Sivasspor	6	1	0	5	4	9	−5	3	1–2	0–2	2–1	

Legend: Blue = home team win; Yellow = draw; Red = away team win.

14 January 2014 Group stage	Eskişehirspor	0–2	Akhisar Belediyespor	Eskişehir, Turkey
16:30 EET (UTC+02)		Report (in Turkish)	Niasse 17', 21'	Stadium: Eskişehir Atatürk Stadium; Attendance: 4500; Referee: Ali Palabıyık

14 January 2014 Group stage	Bursaspor	2–1	Sivasspor	Bursa, Turkey
19:00 EET (UTC+02)	Šesták 37', 72'	Report (in Turkish)	Eşer 57'	Stadium: Bursa Atatürk Stadium; Attendance: 22,500; Referee: Çağatay Şahan

18 January 2014 Group stage	Sivasspor	0–2	Eskişehirspor	Sivas, Turkey
16:30 EET (UTC+02)		Report (in Turkish)	Çek 42'; Bayramoğlu 86'	Stadium: Sivas 4 Eylül Stadium; Attendance: 5000; Referee: Kutluhan Bilgiç

18 January 2014 Group stage	Akhisar Belediyespor	0–0	Bursaspor	Manisa, Turkey
19:00 EET (UTC+02)		Report (in Turkish)		Stadium: Manisa 19 Mayıs Stadium; Attendance: 6000; Referee: Murat Özcan

22 January 2014 Group stage	Sivasspor	2–1	Akhisar Belediyespor	Sivas, Turkey
13:30 EET (UTC+02)	Arslan 20', 84'	Report (in Turkish)	Özer 77'	Stadium: Sivas 4 Eylül Stadium; Attendance: 2500; Referee: Mustafa Aydın

22 January 2014 Group stage	Bursaspor	4–1	Eskişehirspor	Bursa, Turkey
17:00 EET (UTC+02)	Kamara 12' (o.g.); Kiraz 36'; Belluschi 65'; Kazim-Richards 82'	Report (in Turkish)	Ângelo 75'	Stadium: Bursa Atatürk Stadium; Attendance: 22.000; Referee: Volkan Bayarslan

29 January 2014 Group stage	Eskişehirspor	1–0	Bursaspor	Eskişehir, Turkey
17:00 EET (UTC+02)	Jorquera 89' (pen.)	Report (in Turkish)		Stadium: Eskişehir Atatürk Stadium; Attendance: 9000; Referee: Serkan Çınar

30 January 2014 Group stage	Akhisar Belediyespor	1–0	Sivasspor	Manisa, Turkey
19:00 EET (UTC+02)	Niasse 32'	Report (in Turkish)		Stadium: Manisa 19 Mayıs Stadium; Attendance: 3000; Referee: Suat Arslanboğa

5 February 2014 Group stage	Akhisar Belediyespor	1–1	Eskişehirspor	Manisa, Turkey
20:00 EET (UTC+02)	Vural 13'	Report (in Turkish)	Jorquera 66' (pen.)	Stadium: Manisa 19 Mayıs Stadium; Attendance: 9437; Referee: Süleyman Abay

6 February 2014 Group stage	Sivasspor	1–2	Bursaspor	Sivas, Turkey
19:00 EET (UTC+02)	Özkara 71'	Report (in Turkish)	Šesták 53'; Şahbaz 85' (o.g.)	Stadium: Sivas 4 Eylül Stadium; Attendance: 2250; Referee: Mustafa İlker Coşkun

12 February 2014 Group stage	Eskişehirspor	1–0	Sivasspor	Eskişehir, Turkey
20:00 EET (UTC+02)	Bienvenu 76'	Report (in Turkish)		Stadium: Eskişehir Atatürk Stadium; Attendance: 11.000; Referee: Onur Karabaş

12 February 2014 Group stage	Bursaspor	3–0	Akhisar Belediyespor	Bursa, Turkey
20:00 EET (UTC+02)	Çinaz 13'; Renato Cajá 77'; Ünal 90+2'	Report (in Turkish)		Stadium: Bursa Atatürk Stadium; Attendance: 17.000; Referee: Deniz Ateş Bitnel

=== Group B ===
Pos	Team	Pld	W	D	L	GF	GA	GD	Pts	ANT	GAL	ELZ	TOK
1	Antalyaspor	6	3	3	0	12	4	+8	12		1–1	2–1	6–1
2	Galatasaray	6	3	2	1	9	2	+7	11	0–0		3–0	2–0
3	Elazığspor	6	2	2	2	9	9	0	8	1–1	1–0		4–1
4	Tokatspor	6	0	1	5	4	19	−15	1	0–2	0–3	2–2	

Legend: Blue = home team win; Yellow = draw; Red = away team win.

15 January 2014 Group stage	Elazığspor	1–1	Antalyaspor	Elazığ, Turkey
16:30 EET (UTC+02)	Gürler 29'	Report (in Turkish)	Başsan 47'	Stadium: Elazığ Atatürk Stadium; Attendance: 7200; Referee: Onur Karabaş

15 January 2014 Group stage	Galatasaray	2–0	Tokatspor	Istanbul, Turkey
19:00 EET (UTC+02)	İnan 69' (pen.); Amrabat 90'	Report (in Turkish)		Stadium: Türk Telekom Arena; Attendance: 15,000; Referee: Koray Gençerler

19 January 2014 Group stage	Tokatspor	2–2	Elazığspor	Tokat, Turkey
13:30 EET (UTC+02)	Yasar 11', 62'	Report (in Turkish)	Alkan 34'; Gürler 59' (pen.)	Stadium: Tokat Gaziosmanpaşa Stadium; Attendance: 4500; Referee: Kemal Yaşar

19 January 2014 Group stage	Antalyaspor	1–1	Galatasaray	Antalya, Turkey
20:00 EET (UTC+02)	Diarra 89'	Report (in Turkish)	İnan 44' (pen.)	Stadium: Akdeniz University Stadium; Attendance: 6500; Referee: Abdulkadir Bitigen

22 January 2014 Group stage	Elazığspor	1–0	Galatasaray	Elazığ, Turkey
19:00 EET (UTC+02)	Özkan 52' (pen.)	Report (in Turkish)		Stadium: Elazığ Atatürk Stadium; Attendance: 10.750; Referee: Murat Türker

22 January 2014 Group stage	Antalyaspor	6–1	Tokatspor	Antalya, Turkey
20:00 EET (UTC+02)	Duruer 15', 28'; Insa 23'; Başsan 43', 51'; Karaman 90'	Report (in Turkish)	Turp 53'	Stadium: Akdeniz University Stadium; Attendance: 3200; Referee: Ferhan Kestanlıoğlu

29 January 2014 Group stage	Tokatspor	0–2	Antalyaspor	Tokat, Turkey
13:30 EET (UTC+02)		Report (in Turkish)	Şentürk 78'; Diarra 90'	Stadium: Tokat Gaziosmanpaşa Stadium; Attendance: 2000; Referee: Alper Ulusoy

29 January 2014 Group stage	Galatasaray	3−0	Elazığspor	Istanbul, Turkey
20:00 EET (UTC+02)	Gülselam 38'; Drogba 44'; Sarıoğlu 85'	Report (in Turkish)		Stadium: Atatürk Olympic Stadium; Attendance: 5250; Referee: Deniz Çoban

5 February 2014 Group stage	Tokatspor	0–3	Galatasaray	Tokat, Turkey
14:00 EET (UTC+02)		Report (in Turkish)	Hajrović 26'; Kurtuluş 40'; Sarı 83'	Stadium: Tokat Gaziosmanpaşa Stadium; Attendance: 5762; Referee: Özgüç Türkalp

5 February 2014 Group stage	Antalyaspor	2–1	Elazığspor	Antalya, Turkey
18:00 EET (UTC+02)	Şentürk 35'; Yedek 46'	Report (in Turkish)	Yılmaz 75'	Stadium: Akdeniz University Stadium; Attendance: 1300; Referee: Barış Şimşek

12 February 2014 Group stage	Galatasaray	0–0	Antalyaspor	Istanbul, Turkey
20:00 EET (UTC+02)		Report (in Turkish)		Stadium: Atatürk Olympic Stadium; Attendance: 4500; Referee: Suat Arslanboğa

13 February 2014 Group stage	Elazığspor	4–1	Tokatspor	Elazığ, Turkey
19:00 EET (UTC+02)	Kal 36' (o.g.); Alkan 43'; Karadeniz 55'; Gürler 73'	Report (in Turkish)	Yalin 11'	Stadium: Elazığ Atatürk Stadium; Referee: Özkan Çeliker

== Bracket ==
Semifinals
1	Galatasaray	2	5	7
4	Bursaspor	2	2	4
3	Eskişehirspor	0	3	3
2	Antalyaspor	1	1	2

Finals
Galatasaray	1
Eskişehirspor	0

== Semi-finals ==
Winner of the first group will be drawn against runners-up of the second group. Also the winners of the second group will play against runners-up of the first group. The matches will be contested as two-legged ties with home and away matches. The runners-up will play the first match in their home ground. The winners of the two legs will play in the final.

=== First leg ===
25 March 2014 Semi-final	Galatasaray	2–2	Bursaspor	Istanbul, Turkey
20:30 EET (UTC+02)	Sneijder 11'; İnan 40' (pen.)	Report (in Turkish)	Şen 46'; Yılmaz 88'	Stadium: Türk Telekom Arena; Attendance: 13,500; Referee: Mustafa Kamil Abitoğlu

26 March 2014 Semi-final	Eskişehirspor	0–1	Antalyaspor	Eskişehir, Turkey
20:30 EET (UTC+02)		Report (in Turkish)	İnceman 82'	Stadium: Eskişehir Atatürk Stadium; Attendance: 17,250; Referee: İlker Meral

=== Second leg ===
16 April 2014 Semi-final	Bursaspor	2–5 (4–7 agg.)	Galatasaray	Bursa, Turkey
20:00 EEST (UTC+03)	Fernandão 28', 33'	Report (in Turkish)	Sneijder 45'; İnan 50' (pen.); Yılmaz 53', 68'; Felipe Melo 71' (pen.)	Stadium: Bursa Atatürk Stadium; Attendance: 23,500; Referee: İlker Meral

17 April 2014 Semi-final	Antalyaspor	1–3 (2–3 agg.)	Eskişehirspor	Antalya, Turkey
20:30 EEST (UTC+03)	Diarra 45'	Report (in Turkish)	Güngör 51' (o.g.); Kamara 61'; Ateş 74'	Stadium: Akdeniz University Stadium; Attendance: 3,500; Referee: Mete Kalkavan

== Final ==
The final was contested in Konya as a one-off match. The winners were awarded 50 medals per club along with the Turkish Cup trophy.

7 May 2014 Final	Galatasaray	1–0	Eskişehirspor	Konya, Turkey
20:00 EEST (UTC+03)	Sneijder 70'	Report (in Turkish)		Stadium: Konya Atatürk Stadium; Attendance: 22,456; Referee: Hüseyin Göçek; Man of the Match: Wesley Sneijder
