= Oğuzhan Kayar =

Turkish footballer (born 1995)

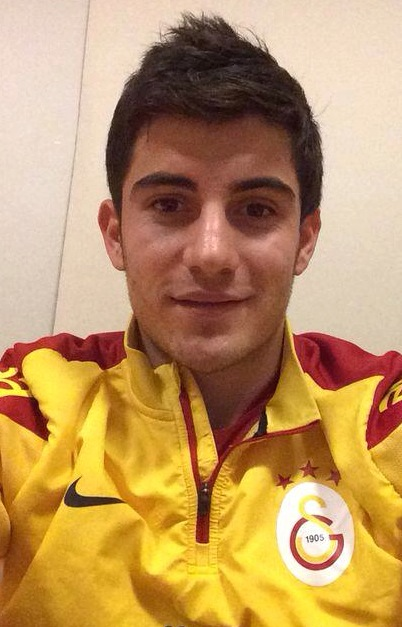
- Kayar in 2014

Personal information
- Date of birth: 2 April 1995 (age 31)
- Place of birth: Aydın, Turkey
- Height: 1.79 m (5 ft 10 in)
- Positions: Attacking midfielder; winger

Team information
- Current team: Tarsus İdman Yurdu
- Number: 20

Youth career
- 2006–2007: Aydınspor
- 2007–2010: Güneşspor
- 2010–2011: SHÇEK Spor
- 2011–2013: Manisaspor

Senior career*
Years	Team	Apps	(Gls)
2013–2014	Manisaspor	4	(0)
2014–2017	Galatasaray	0	(0)
2014–2015	→ Manisaspor (loan)	25	(4)
2015	→ Gaziantep BB (loan)	11	(2)
2016	→ Şanlıurfaspor (loan)	13	(0)
2016–2017	→ Aydınspor (loan)	32	(4)
2017–2018	Bandırmaspor	34	(1)
2018–2019	Utaş Uşakspor	26	(2)
2019–2020	Sancaktepe	10	(1)
2020–2021	Sakaryaspor	21	(2)
2021–2022	Diyarbekirspor	28	(1)
2022–	Tarsus İdman Yurdu	11	(0)

International career^{‡}
2013–2014	Turkey U19	4	(0)
2015	Turkey U20	2	(0)
- * Club domestic league appearances and goals as of 5 November 2022 ‡ National team caps and goals as of 10 October 2015

Oğuzhan Kayar (born 2 April 1995) is a Turkish professional footballer who plays as an attacking midfielder for Tarsus İdman Yurdu. He can also play as a winger.

== Club career ==
=== Galatasaray ===
On 30 January 2014, Galatasaray signed a four-year contract with Oğuzhan from Manisaspor for €750.000. He made his debut for Galatasaray in 2013–14 Turkish Cup against Antalyaspor, which ended 0–0 draw. Oğuzhan started as a left winger and played 90 minutes in that match.

==== Loan to Manisaspor ====
On 14 August 2014, Galatasaray loaned Oğuzhan to his former club Manisaspor until 30 June 2015. In the 2014–15 season, he played 25 league matches and scored 4 goals, also made an assist. Also in 2014–15 Turkish Cup, he played 9 matches and scored a goal against Çorum Belediyespor.

==== Loan to Gaziantep BB ====
On 11 August 2015, Galatasaray loaned Oğuzhan to Gaziantep Büyükşehir Belediyespor until 30 December 2015. He played 11 league matches and scored 2 goals, also made an assist for his team. Oğuzhan did not replace in Turkish Cup for Gaziantep BB.

==== Loan to Şanlıurfaspor ====
On 7 January 2016, Galatasaray loaned Oğuzhan to Şanlıurfaspor until 30 June 2016.
