= Sinan Özkan =

Turkish footballer

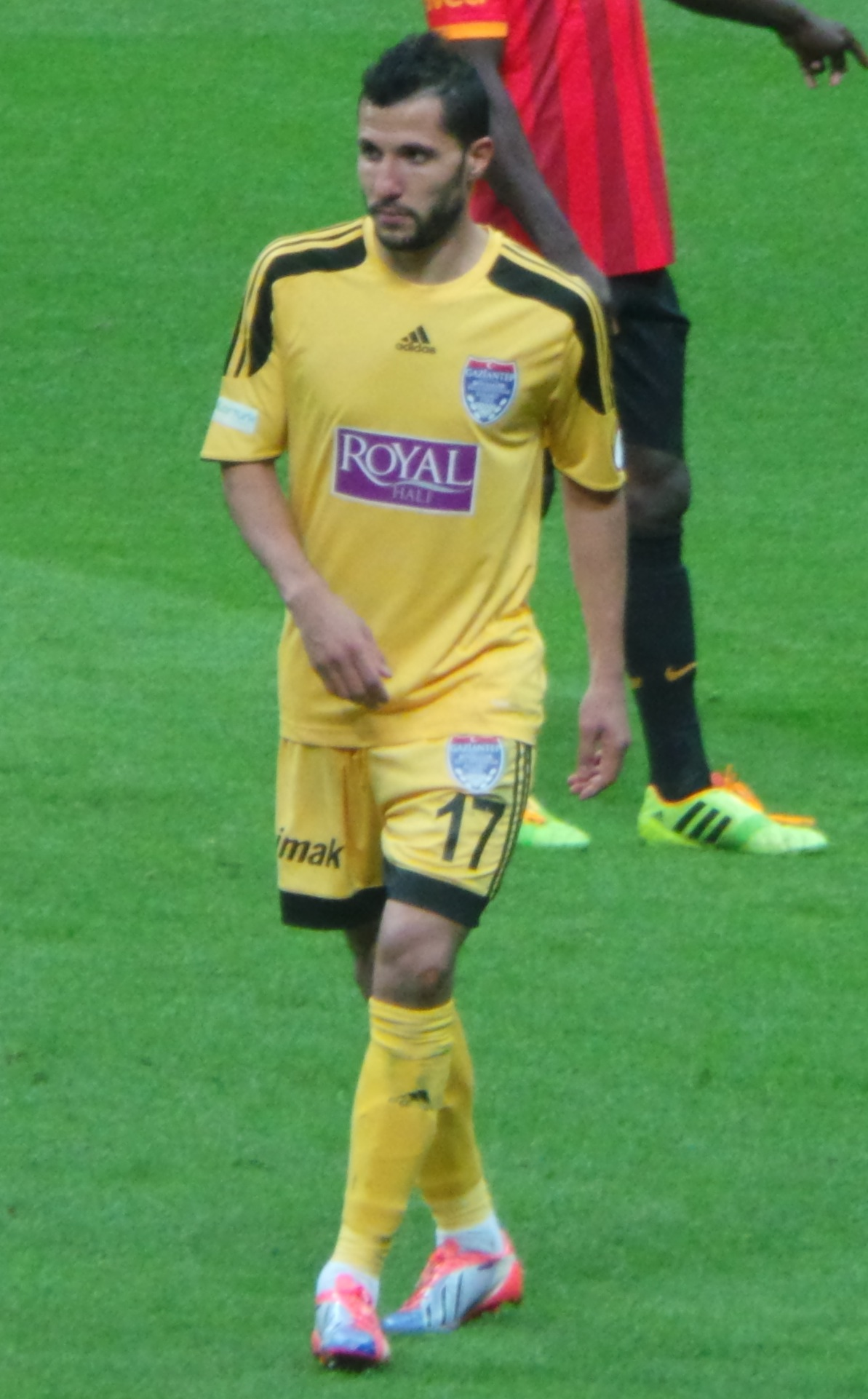

Personal information
- Date of birth: March 22, 1988 (age 38)
- Place of birth: Saint-Étienne, France
- Height: 1.81 m (5 ft 11 1/2 in)
- Position: Right winger

Team information
- Current team: Serik Belediyespor

Youth career
- 2000–05: AS Saint-Étienne

Senior career*
Years	Team	Apps	(Gls)
2005–2006	Türk Telekomspor	17	(2)
2006–2008	Manisaspor	1	(0)
2006–2007	→ Samsunspor (loan)	8	(0)
2008–2009	→ Giresunspor (loan)	9	(2)
2009–2010	Fethiyespor	8	(2)
2010–2011	Tokatspor	32	(9)
2011–2012	Elazığspor	26	(12)
2012–2013	Konyaspor	17	(2)
2013	Adana Demirspor	13	(1)
2013–2014	Gaziantep BB	29	(4)
2014–2016	Alanyaspor	31	(4)
2016–2017	Yeni Malatyaspor	15	(2)
2017	Göztepe	12	(0)
2017–2018	Giresunspor	29	(6)
2018–2019	Afyonspor	12	(1)
2019	Altay	5	(0)
2019	Bayburt Özel İdarespor	11	(0)
2020	Sakaryaspor	10	(0)
2020–	Serik Belediyespor	0	(0)

International career
2006	Turkey U21	5	(0)
- * Club domestic league appearances and goals as of 20 July 2020

Sinan Özkan (born 22 March 1986) is a Turkish footballer who plays for Serik Belediyespor.

== Career ==
Born in Saint-Étienne, Özkan began his career playing youth football for the French team AS Saint-Étienne. He moved to Turkey and played for Türk Telekom Gençlik Spor Kulübü, Samsunspor, Manisaspor, Fethiyespor, Giresunspor, Tokatspor and Elazığspor. He has made seven Turkish Süper Lig appearances for Manisaspor and one appearance for Elazığspor.
