= Ömer Çakı =

Turkish footballer

Personal information
- Full name: Muhammet Ömer Çakı
- Date of birth: 14 January 2000 (age 26)
- Place of birth: Fatih, Turkey
- Height: 1.82 m (6 ft 0 in)
- Position: Defender

Team information
- Current team: Sakaryaspor
- Number: 3

Youth career
- 2012–2014: İstanbul Gençlerbirliği
- 2014–2018: Fenerbahçe

Senior career*
Years	Team	Apps	(Gls)
2018–2020	Fenerbahçe	0	(0)
2020–2022	Adanaspor	10	(0)
2022	→ Orduspor 1967 (loan)	7	(0)
2022–2023	Tarsus Idman Yurdu	6	(0)
2023–2025	Yeni Mersin İdmanyurdu	57	(4)
2025–2026	Elazığspor	47	(4)
2026–	Sakaryaspor	3	(0)

International career^{‡}
2017–2018	Turkey U18	13	(1)
2018–2019	Turkey U19	5	(0)
2019	Turkey U20	1	(0)
- * Club domestic league appearances and goals as of 1 October 2026 ‡ National team caps and goals as of 30 November 2025

Muhammet Ömer Çakı (born 14 January 2000) is a Turkish professional footballer who plays as a defender for TFF 2. Lig club Sakaryaspor.

== Professional career ==
On 3 August 2018, Çakı signed his first professional contract with Fenerbahçe. Çakı made his debut for Fenerbahçe in a 1-0 Europa League loss to FC Spartak Trnava on 13 December 2018.
