= Köksal Yedek =

Turkish footballer

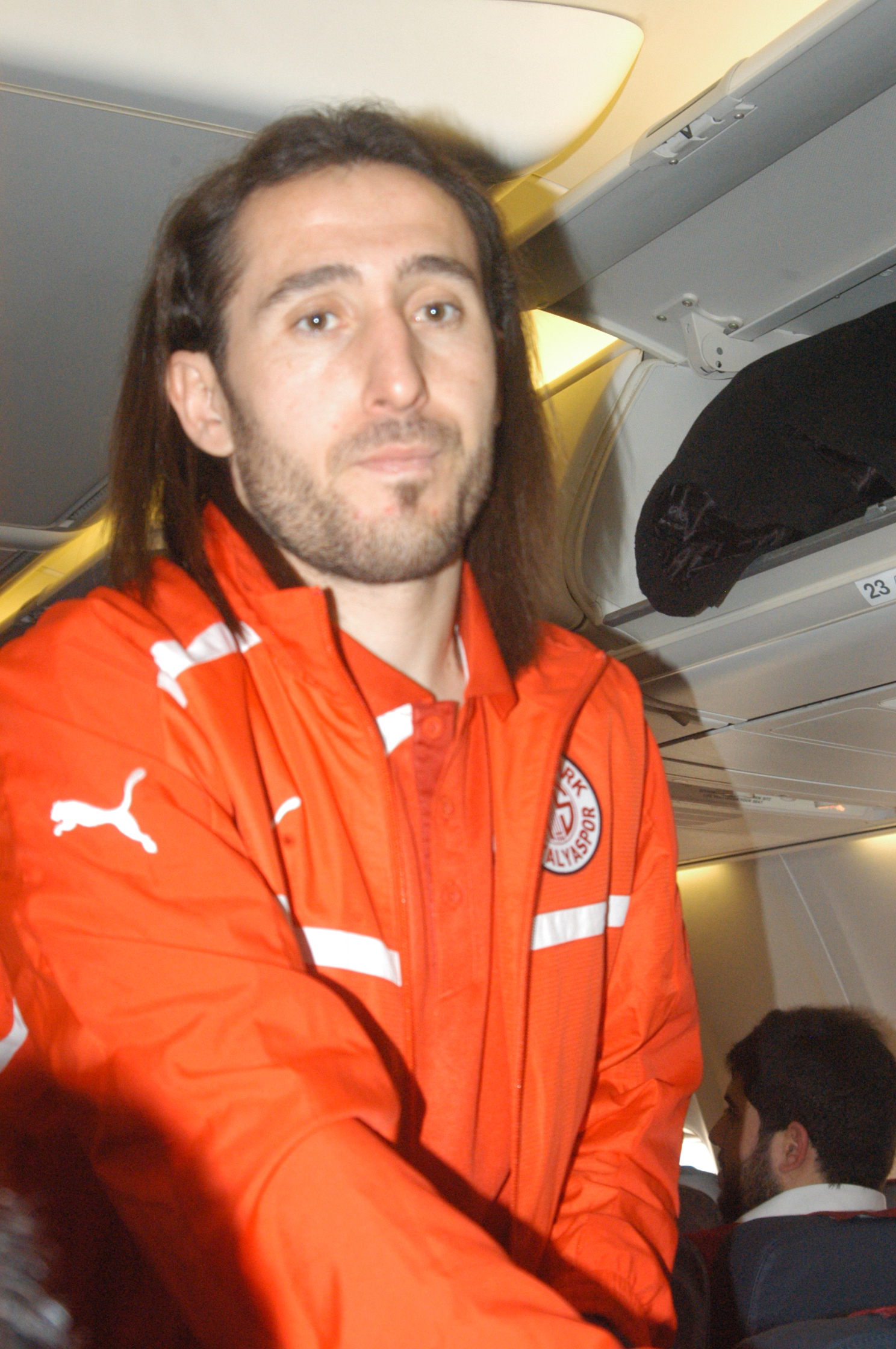

Personal information
- Date of birth: 17 January 1985 (age 41)
- Place of birth: Avanos, Nevşehir, Turkey
- Height: 1.80 m (5 ft 11 in)
- Position: Winger

Team information
- Current team: Nişantaşıspor

Youth career
- 1999–2002: Zeytinburnuspor

Senior career*
Years	Team	Apps	(Gls)
2002–2005	Zeytinburnuspor	35	(3)
2005–2007	Kayserispor	14	(0)
2007	Şanlıurfaspor	13	(1)
2007–2009	Kayseri Erciyesspor	65	(9)
2009–2010	Karşıyaka	30	(3)
2010–2011	Kayseri Erciyesspor	33	(4)
2011–2014	Elazığspor	86	(9)
2014	Antalyaspor	11	(1)
2014–2015	Gaziantep BB	32	(4)
2015–2016	Karabükspor	22	(1)
2017–2018	Hatayspor	12	(0)
2020–	Nişantaşıspor		
- * Club domestic league appearances and goals as of 12:51, 28 March 2021 (UTC)

Köksal Yedek (born 17 January 1985) is a Turkish footballer who plays as a winger for Nişantaşıspor.
