= Abdülaziz Demircan =

Turkish footballer

Personal information
- Date of birth: 5 February 1991 (age 35)
- Place of birth: Diyarbakır, Turkey
- Height: 1.93 m (6 ft 4 in)
- Position: Goalkeeper

Team information
- Current team: Sultanbeyli Belediyespor

Senior career*
Years	Team	Apps	(Gls)
2009–2012	Diyarbakır BB	38	(0)
2012–2015	Karabükspor	15	(0)
2015–2016	Kayserispor	6	(0)
2016–2017	Konyaspor	1	(0)
2018	Dalkurd	8	(0)
2018–2019	Osmanlıspor	10	(0)
2019–2020	Amed	23	(0)
2020–2021	1461 Trabzon	26	(0)
2021–2023	Tarsus İdman Yurdu	47	(0)
2023–2024	Etimesgut Belediyespor	28	(0)
2024–2025	Ankaraspor	6	(0)
2025	Karaman FK	2	(0)
2025–	Sultanbeyli Belediyespor		

International career
2014	Turkey A2	1	(0)
- * Club domestic league appearances and goals as of 30 August 2025

Abdülaziz Demircan (born 5 February 1991) is a Turkish footballer of Kurdish descent who plays as a goalkeeper for the amateur side Sultanbeyli Belediyespor.

== Club career ==
Born in Diyarbakır, Turkey, the goalkeeper played for Diyarbakır BB, Karabükspor, Kayserispor, Konyaspor, Dalkurd, Osmanlıspor, and Amed S.K.

== International career ==
Demircan made his debut for a Turkish A2-side also known as Turkey B under head coach Fatih Terim on 14 October 2014. The opponent was England C. He had a clean sheet, while Turkey B won the friendly with a 2–0 score.

== Forced leave of Dalkurd FF ==
Despite the announcement of club press officer Cihan Dalaba in May 2018 that Demircan's private Instagram account was hacked, the goalkeeper was released in June 2018 by Swedish side Dalkurd FF. Demircan sharing a picture on Instagram Story with the Turkish flag, Atatürk and the figures 1919 which also referred to the beginning of the Turkish War of Independence of 1919, created great anger among Dalkurd FF-supporters. Ultimately, this forced Demircan to leave the club, according to Director of Football Adil Kizil.

Demircan later stated that he was sent to the bench after the sharing on Instagram because of the fear of attacks of club fans. He also got harassed and teammates insulted him and would not talk to him afterwards. Fearing repercussions the statements about a hacking were communicated by the club, told Demircan.
