= Berat Tosun =

Turkish footballer

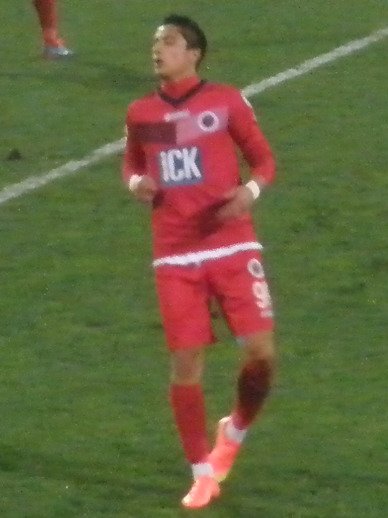

Personal information
- Date of birth: 1 January 1994 (age 32)
- Place of birth: Mamak, Turkey
- Height: 1.79 m (5 ft 10 in)
- Positions: Striker; forward; winger

Team information
- Current team: Hacettepe 1945 SK

Youth career
- 2007–2011: Gençlerbirliği

Senior career*
Years	Team	Apps	(Gls)
2011–2018	Gençlerbirliği	29	(3)
2012–2014	→ Hacettepe (loan)	71	(32)
2016	→ Balıkesirspor (loan)	16	(0)
2016	→ Boluspor (loan)	9	(0)
2017	→ Adana Demirspor (loan)	8	(0)
2017–2018	→ Fethiyespor (loan)	18	(3)
2018–2019	Tokatspor	15	(1)
2019–2021	Etimesgut Belediyespor	28	(6)
2021	→ Adıyaman FK (loan)	13	(4)
2021	Niğde Anadolu	9	(1)
2022	Siirt İl Özel İdaresi SK	17	(4)
2022–2023	Afjet Afyonspor	16	(3)
2023	Fethiyespor	3	(0)
2023–	Hacettepe 1945 SK	0	(0)

International career^{‡}
2014	Turkey U20	2	(2)
2015	Turkey U21	2	(0)
- * Club domestic league appearances and goals as of 19 April 2023 ‡ National team caps and goals as of 31 March 2015

Berat Tosun (born 1 January 1994) is a Turkish footballer of Albanian descent who plays for TFF Third League club Hacettepe 1945 SK. He made his Süper Lig debut on 19 September 2014.

== Gençlerbirliği ==
Berat Tosun has played in the youth squad for Gençlerbirliği and during Süper Lig: 2014–15 Süper Lig he made it to the official team. On 28 September 2014, Gençlerbirliği hosted Balıkesirspor and in the 33rd minute Guido Koçer made a cross from the left side assisting Berat Tosun to make the final knee touch to score the opening goal. In the same game Berat Tosun made his second goal in the 75th minute and this time he received pass from Jean-Jacques Gosso in the penalty box assisting Berat to make an easy finish to put back up Gençlerbirliği 2–1 over Balikesirspor. The game ended 3–1 victory by the home side Gençlerbirliği. On 26 December 2014, Gençlerbirliği hosted Galatasaray, while the away side was up 1–0, Berat Tosun came on to the pitch in the second half and as soon as he came on with the first touch he was able to make a wonderful cross from the right side of the field to Bogdan Stancu to make it 1-1 and game ended in a draw for both sides. On 5 January 2015, Mersin İdman Yurdu hosted the away side Gençlerbirliği and on the 51st minute Hakan Aslantaş rushed down the right side to cross the ball to the penalty box and inside the box Berat ran towards the ball and was able to volley the ball into the net to score the opening goal for Gençlerbirliği. However, this wasn't enough for the away side for the win as Welliton Soares de Morais scored in the 77th minute to make it a draw.
