= Umut Gündoğan =

Turkish footballer

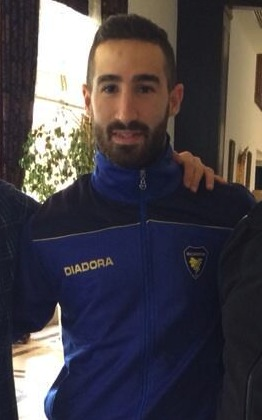

Personal information
- Full name: Umut Gündoğan
- Date of birth: 12 June 1990 (age 36)
- Place of birth: Brussels, Belgium
- Height: 1.70 m (5 ft 7 in)
- Position: Midfielder

Team information
- Current team: Olympic Charleroi
- Number: 17

Youth career
- –2007: Anderlecht
- 2007: MVV

Senior career*
Years	Team	Apps	(Gls)
2007–2009	Gençlerbirliği	0	(0)
2009	→ Fethiyespor (loan)	4	(0)
2009–2010	RBC Roosendaal	25	(3)
2010–2012	FC Brussels	26	(2)
2012–2014	Bucaspor	50	(6)
2014–2018	Galatasaray	1	(0)
2015	→ Adana Demirspor (loan)	17	(1)
2015–2016	→ Şanlıurfaspor (loan)	5	(0)
2017	→ Manisaspor (loan)	17	(1)
2018–2020	Boluspor	28	(1)
2021–	Olympic Charleroi	9	(0)

International career^{‡}
2014	Turkey A2	1	(0)
- * Club domestic league appearances and goals as of 18:09, 14 December 2021 (UTC) ‡ National team caps and goals as of 8 July 2017

Umut Gündoğan (born 12 June 1990) is a Turkish professional footballer who plays as a midfielder for Olympic Charleroi.

== Club career ==
In August 2021, Gündoğan signed with Olympic Charleroi after having been a free agent for more than a year.

== International career ==
Gündoğan made his debut for the Turkish A2 national team on 5 March 2014.

== Honours ==
Galatasaray

- Türkiye Kupası: 2013–14
