= Nişantaşıspor =

Turkish football club

- Full name: Nişantaşıspor
- Founded: 1914 (Year of foundation)
- Ground: Ayazağa Yusuf Tunaoğlu Stadium, Şişli
- Capacity: 700
- Chairman: Ferit Baltacıoğlu
- Manager: İbrahim Kemal Menderes
- League: Super Amateur Leagues
- Website: http://www.nisantasisporkulubu.org/
Home colours	Away colours

Nişantaşıspor is a Turkish football club located in Şişli, Turkey.

== History ==
Nişantaşıspor was unofficially founded in 1907, and officially in 1914. Nişantaşıspor spent most of its entire career in amateur leagues in Turkey. They were bought by the Gülenist organization FETÖ headed by Fethullah Gülen, and reached their peak in the TFF First League for the 1996–97 season. This link was exposed early on, and FETÖ left the club as they got relegated into the amateur leagues.

== Colours and badge ==
Nişantaşıspor's colours are blue and red.
