= Yiğit Gökoğlan =

Turkish footballer (born 1989)

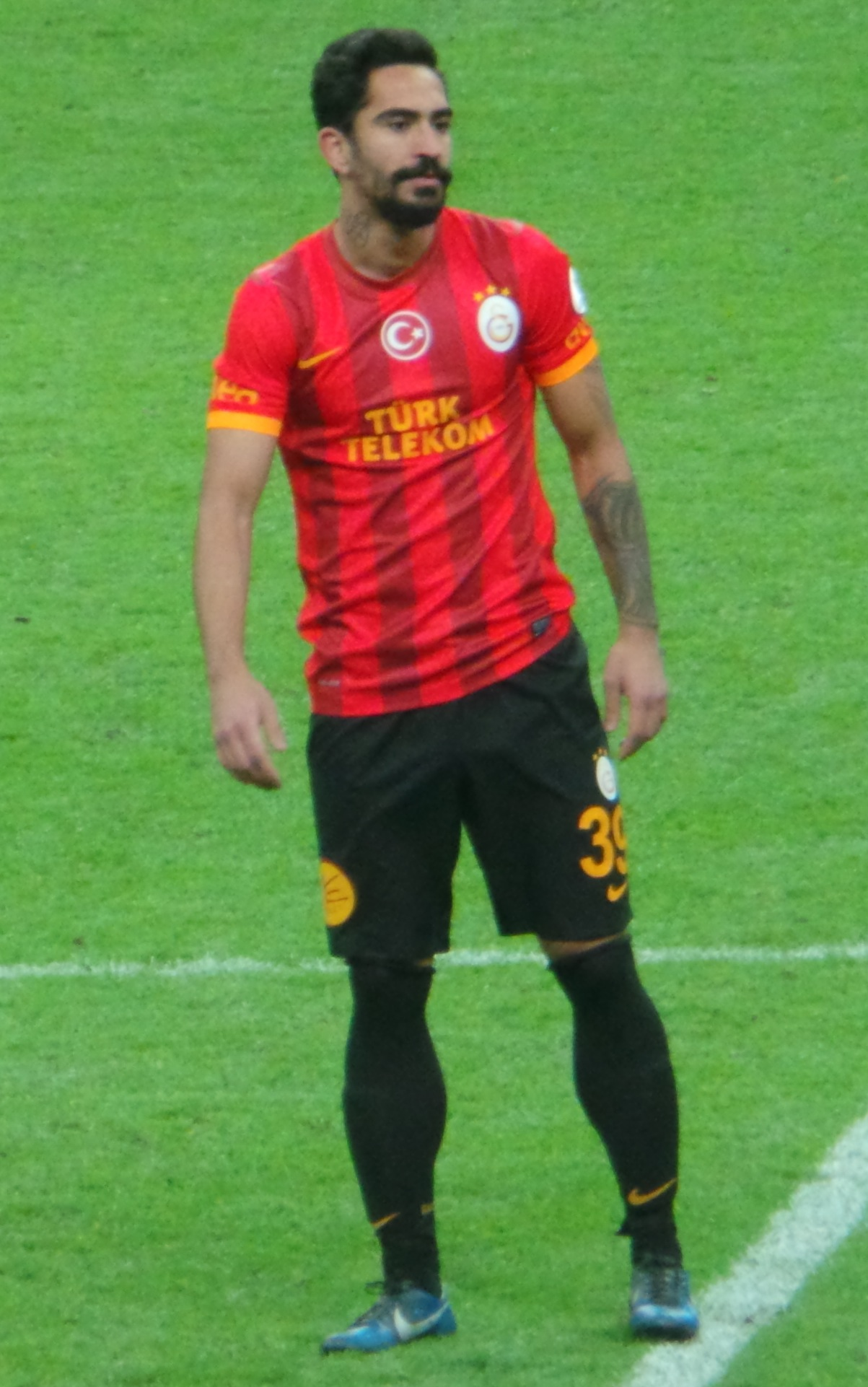

Personal information
- Full name: Yiğit İsmail Gökoğlan
- Date of birth: 5 June 1989 (age 37)
- Place of birth: Konak, İzmir, Turkey
- Height: 1.82 m (5 ft 11 1/2 in)
- Position: Winger

Team information
- Current team: Bergama Belediyespor
- Number: 7

Youth career
- 1999–2006: Göztepe
- 2006–2008: Manisaspor

Senior career*
Years	Team	Apps	(Gls)
2008–2012	Manisaspor	88	(6)
2008	→ Altınordu (loan)	14	(1)
2012–2015	Galatasaray	8	(1)
2012–2013	→ Orduspor (loan)	12	(0)
2014	→ Kayseri Erciyesspor (loan)	11	(0)
2015	Akhisar Belediyespor	2	(0)
2015–2016	Balıkesirspor	27	(3)
2016–2017	Bandırmaspor	23	(0)
2017–2019	Fethiyespor	17	(3)
2019–2020	Zonguldak Kömürspor	17	(1)
2020–2021	Vanspor	11	(0)
2021	Modafen	13	(0)
2021–2022	Kuşadasıspor	17	(3)
2022–	Bergama Belediyespor	9	(2)

International career
2008	Turkey U19	9	(1)
2008	Turkey U20	2	(0)
2009	Turkey U21	9	(2)
2011	Turkey A2	1	(0)
- * Club domestic league appearances and goals as of 12 November 2022

Yiğit İsmail Gökoğlan (born 5 June 1989) is a Turkish professional footballer who plays as a winger for Bergama Belediyespor.

Gökoğlan is also a youth international, having been capped at U-19, U-20, and U-21 levels for Turkey.

== Early years ==
Gökoğlan was born in Konak, İzmir. His parents divorced at an early age and he lived with his father, seeing his mother on weekends. Originally a forward, Gökoğlan switched to the winger position after moving to Manisaspor. In 1999, Gökoğlan joined local club Aliağa. At the time, his school and the club's training grounds were near his home, allowing easy access to both. However, once his father decided to move to Turgutlu, a large town in Manisa Province, Gökoğlan was left to live at the training facilities as a 14-year-old.

== Club career ==
=== Manisaspor ===
Levent Eriş, along with his assistant Hakan Şapçı, discovered Gökoğlan at a youth league match. They signed him to a youth contract with Manisaspor in 2006. As a 16-year-old, Gökoğlan would train with the senior squad, while still competing in the youth leagues. In total, he made 44 appearances in the A2 league, scoring four goals. At the start of the 2007–08 season, Giray BULAK took over as manager. Gökoğlan was loaned out to TFF Third League outfit Altınordu during the winter break. He was unable to settle in at first, but began to feel better once the club started winning matches. At the end of the season, Altınordu missed out on direct promotion because of the goal difference rule. However, the team won promotion after defeating Bingöl Belediyespor and Keçiörengücü in the promotion play-offs. Gökoğlan made 14 appearances, scoring one goal.

=== Galatasaray ===
After months of speculation on his future, on 12 January 2012 it was announced that Yiğit joined Galatasaray on a 4 1/2-year deal for a fee of €2.5 million.

On 25 January 2012 he scored his first league goal for Galatasaray against MKE Ankaragücü on his debut in a 4–0 home win.

== International career ==
Gökoğlan was first called up to national duty in 2008, after a third round matchup against Aydınspor. He competed in six friendlies, before playing all three matches during 2008 UEFA European Under-19 Football Championship elite qualification. Turkey finished third and did not progress. Gökoğlan was then called up to the U-20s, playing two friendlies against Finland. He has also been capped at U-21 level, playing in the Akdeniz Cup and 2011 UEFA European Under-21 Football Championship qualification.

== Honours ==
Galatasaray

- Süper Lig: 2011–12
- Süper Kupa: 2012
