= Tarsus İdman Yurdu =

Turkish sports club

- Full name: Tarsus İdman Yurdu Spor Kulübü
- Nickname: Çukurova'nın Efendisi (Ruler of Çukurova)
- Founded: 1923; 103 years ago
- Ground: Burhanettin Kocamaz Stadium, Tarsus
- Capacity: 4,201
- Chairman: Muhammet Günkut
- League: Turkish Regional Amateur League
- 2023–24: TFF Third League Group I, 15th of 15 (relegated)
Home colours	Away colours

Tarsus İdman Yurdu is a Turkish sports club based in Tarsus.

== History ==
Founded in 1923, the football team plays at the Burhanettin Kocamaz Stadium, which has a capacity of 4,201. They were named as Tarsus İdman Yurdu Erkutspor between 1983 and 1986 during the chairmanship of Erkut Kuzeyman, who was also a businessman.

== Rivalries ==
Adana Demirspor, Adanaspor and Mersin İdman Yurdu are the rivals of Tarsus İY. The matches between these clubs are also referred to as the Çukurova derbies.

== League participations ==
- TFF First League: 1969–72, 1980–83, 1984–88, 1991–95
- TFF Second League: 1967–69, 1972–80, 1988–91, 1995–01, 2002–11, 2012–16, 2018–23
- TFF Third League: 2001–02, 2011–12, 2016–18, 2023–24
- Turkish Regional Amateur League: 1983–84, 2024–

== Current squad ==
As of 12 December 2022

Note: Flags indicate national team as defined under FIFA eligibility rules; some limited exceptions apply. Players may hold more than one non-FIFA nationality.

No.	Pos.	Nation	Player
1	GK	TUR	Abdülaziz Demircan
3	DF	TUR	Ömer Çakı
4	DF	TUR	Eyüpcan Delibalta
7	FW	GER	Cengiz Ötkün
8	MF	TUR	Fatih Somuncu
10	FW	TUR	Yılmaz Can Taşkıran
11	FW	TUR	Halil İbrahim Tuna
17	DF	TUR	Yusuf Talum
18	MF	TUR	Mutlu Aksu Doğan (on loan from Adanaspor)
19	FW	TUR	Artun Akçakın
20	MF	TUR	Oğuzhan Kayar
22	FW	TUR	Alperen Pak
23	DF	TUR	Fatih Solmaz

No.	Pos.	Nation	Player
25	MF	TUR	Uğur Utlu
35	GK	TUR	Barış Türkmen
41	DF	TUR	Gökhan Meral
42	GK	TUR	Mert Can Salık
47	MF	TUR	Azad Filiz
50	FW	TUR	Mert Temizkan
54	DF	TUR	Furkan Özcan
61	FW	TUR	Taha Balcı
68	DF	TUR	Volkan Altınsoy
69	DF	TUR	Sefa Durmuş
97	MF	TUR	Ferit Bay Gündüz
—	MF	SYR	Mohammad Lith Alzin
