= Serdar Deliktaş =

Turkish footballer

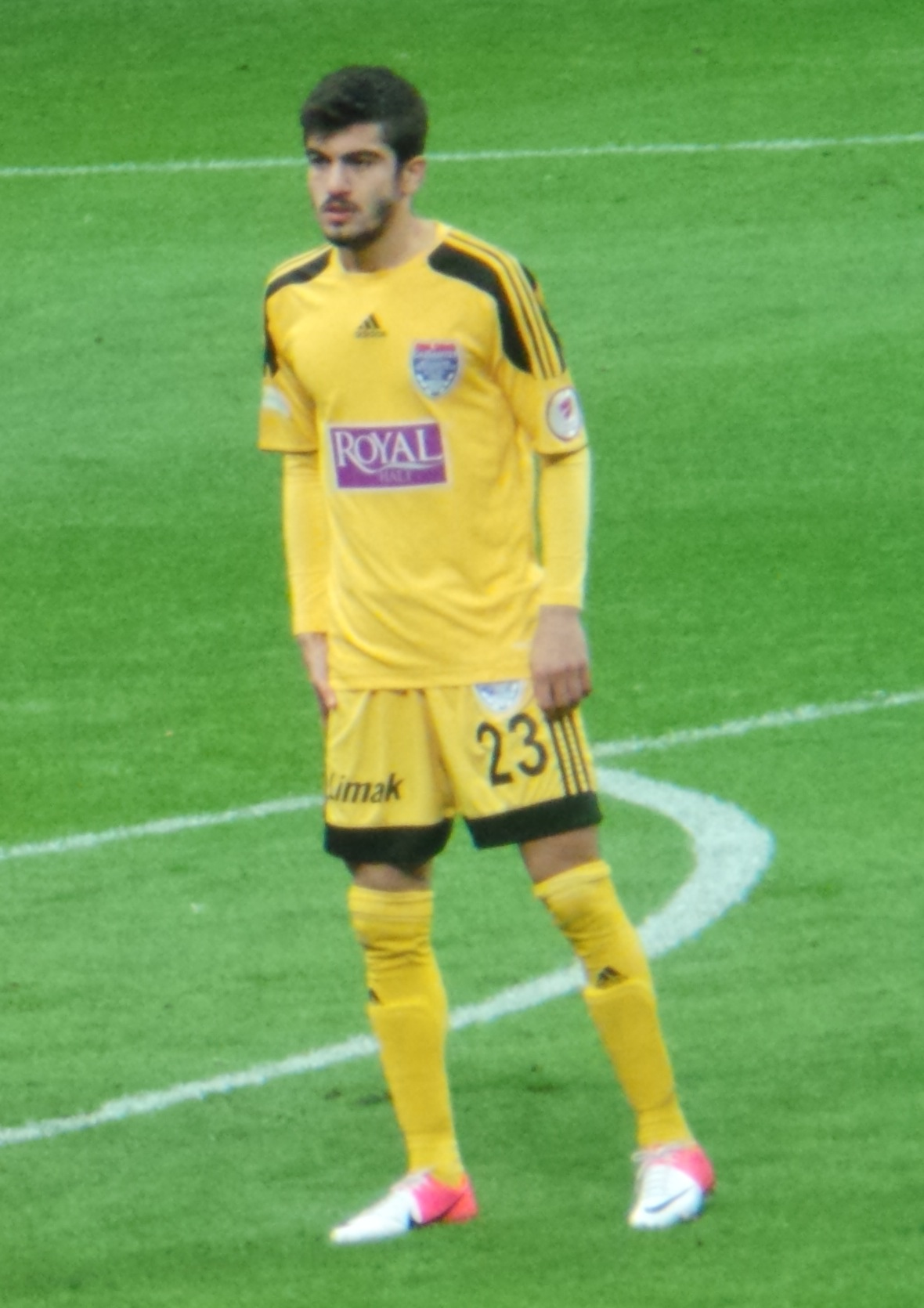

Personal information
- Date of birth: 4 August 1986 (age 40)
- Place of birth: Elazığ, Turkey
- Height: 1.79 m (5 ft 10 in)
- Position: Forward

Youth career
- 2000–2004: Kahramanmaraşspor

Senior career*
Years	Team	Apps	(Gls)
2004–2007	Kahramanmaraşspor	39	(5)
2007–2009	Gaskispor	42	(9)
2009–2014	Gaziantep BB	152	(41)
2014	Alanyaspor	0	(0)
2014–2016	Osmanlıspor	47	(11)
2016–2018	Karabükspor	22	(2)
2018	Gaziantep BB	11	(1)
2018–2019	Altınordu	19	(6)
2019–2021	Manisa	46	(28)
2021–2022	Pendikspor	29	(8)
2022–2023	Esenler Erokspor	29	(3)
2023	Ankaraspor	5	(0)
Total		441	(114)
- * Club domestic league appearances and goals as of 3 December 2023

Serdar Deliktaş (born 4 August 1986) is a Turkish footballer who plays as a forward.

== Career ==
On 28 June 2016, Deliktaş joined Kardemir Karabükspor on a two-year contract.
