= Gaziosmanpaşa Stadium =

Multi-use stadium in Turkey

Coordinates: 40°19′41.20″N 36°33′21.46″E

Gaziosmanpaşa Stadyumu
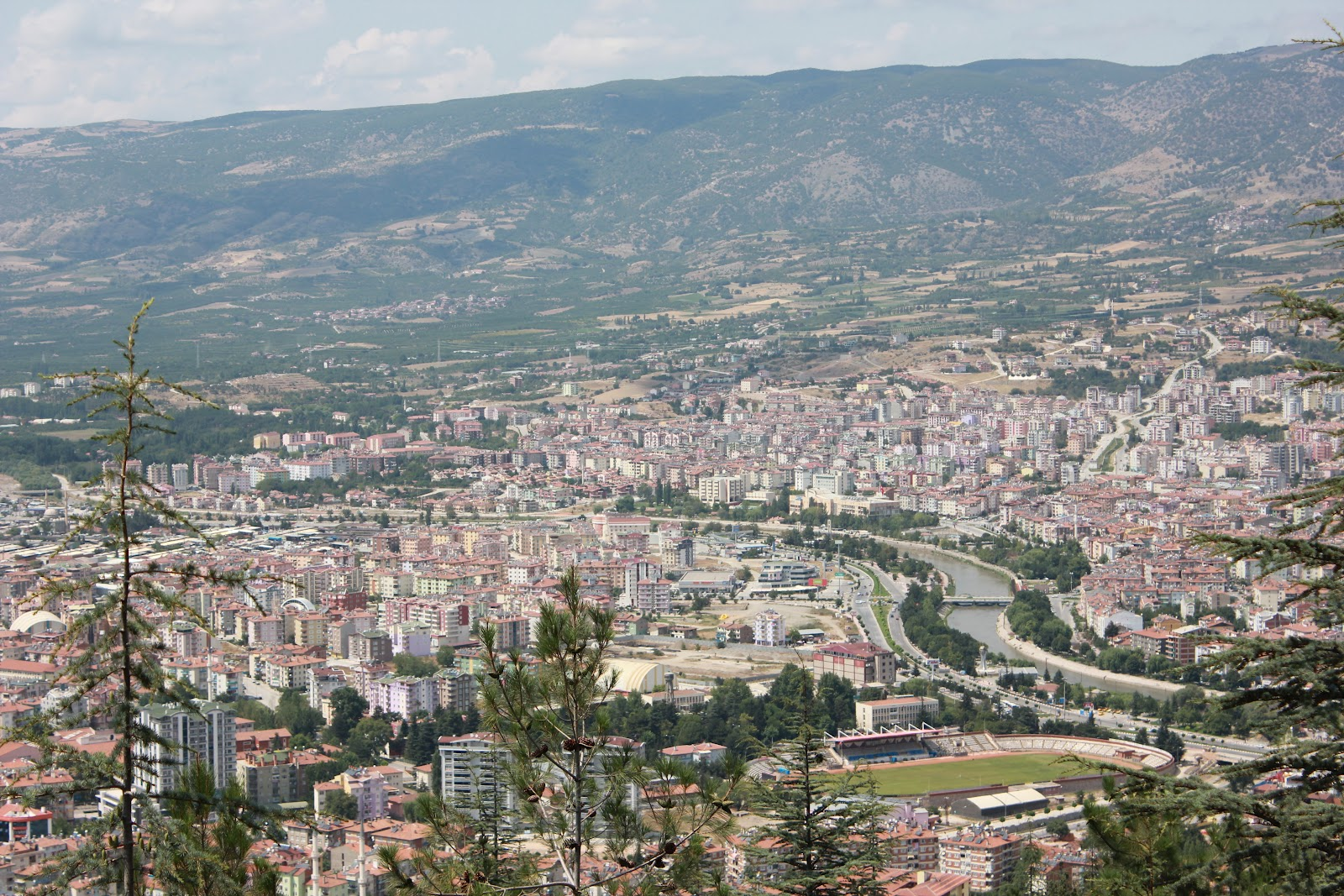
- Interactive map of Gaziosmanpaşa Stadyumu
- Location: Tokat, Turkey
- Capacity: 5,762
- Surface: Grass
- Field size: 105m x 68m

Construction
- Opened: 1984
- Closed: 23 February 2026

Tenants
- Tokatspor (until 2021), Tokat Belediyespor

Gaziosmanpaşa Stadium (Turkish: Gaziosmanpaşa Stadyumu) is a multi-use stadium in Tokat, Turkey. It is currently used mostly for football matches and is the home stadium of Tokatspor and Tokat Belediyespor. The stadium was opened in 1984 and holds 5,762 people.

Demolition of the stadium began on 23 February 2026. In a statement, it was announced that the new stadium will be built on the same site.
