= Sakaryaspor =

Turkish football club

- Full name: Sakaryaspor Kulübü Derneği
- Founded: 17 June 1965
- Ground: New Sakarya Stadium, Adapazarı
- Capacity: 28,113
- President: Cumhur Genç
- Head coach: Vacant
- League: TFF 2. Lig
- 2025–26: TFF 1. Lig, 18th of 20 (relegated)
- Website: https://sakaryaspor.org.tr/
Home colours	Away colours	Third colours

Sakaryaspor Kulübü Derneği, commonly known as Sakaryaspor, is a Turkish professional football club based in Adapazarı, the capital of Sakarya Province. Founded in 1965, the club competes in the TFF First League, the second tier of the Turkish football league system. Sakaryaspor play their home matches at the 28,113-capacity New Sakarya Stadium, and traditionally wear green and black striped shirts. The club has a strong regional following and is known for its rivalry with Kocaelispor.

== History ==
The club was formed in 1965 after the merger of Adapazarı Gençlerbirliği, Adapazarı İdman Yurdu, Güneşspor and Ada Gençlik. The club is better known as Sakaryaspor.

The football club is nicknamed the "Football Factory" by Turkish football scene because of the many national footballers born and raised in the city. Sakarya Province has also five national top scorers (Hakan Şükür, Aykut Kocaman, Bülent Uygun, Aykut Yiğit, Ogün Altıparmak) of all time and three of them did carry the Sakaryaspor shirt. Sakaryaspor became TFF First League champions in 1980–81 and 1986–87. They accomplished this feat again at the end of the 2005–06 season. Sakaryaspor subsequently won a place in the play–off matches. After eliminating İstanbulspor in the first play–off match, Sakaryaspor went on to defeat Altay 4–1 in the finals and were promoted to the Süper Lig. They were relegated from the Süper Lig the following season.

In 1988 the team won the Turkish Cup, with some of the Turkish football legends like Oğuz Çetin, Hakan Şükür, Engin İpekoğlu and Aykut Kocaman in the squad.

In 2022, it became the champion of Turkey's third professional league, the 2st league, and was promoted to the 1st league. In the 2023–2024 season, it played the play-off final match with Bodrum Football Club.

== Supporters and rivalries ==
Sakaryaspor fans call themselves "Tatangalar", which was founded in 1990 and means "Bisons". The name Tatanga (Tatanka) comes from the movie Dances with Wolves. The word Tatanga (plural Tatangalar) became the nickname of the club over time. Kocaelispor is considered as the archrival and the supporters have friendly ties with Göztepe.

== League participations ==
- Turkish Super League: 1981–86, 1987–90, 1998–99, 2004–05, 2006–07
- TFF First League: 1965–81, 1986–87, 1990–98, 1999–04, 2005–06, 2007–09, 2011–12, 2022–26
- TFF Second League: 2009–11, 2012–13, 2017–22, 2026–
- TFF Third League: 2013–17

== Achievements ==
- Second League Category A:
  - Winners (2): 2004, 2006
- Second League:
  - Winners (2): 1998, 2011
- Third League:
  - Winners (1): 2017
- Turkish Cup:
  - Winners (1): 1988

== European participations ==
As of 9 November 1988

Competition	Pld	W	D	L	GF	GA	GD
UEFA Cup Winners' Cup	4	1	0	3	3	7	–4

European Cup Winners' Cup:

Season	Round	Club	Home	Away	Aggregate
1988–89	1R	(Hungary) Békéscsabai	2–0	0–1	2–1
1988–89	2R	(West Germany) Eintracht Frankfurt	0–3	1–3	1–6

=== UEFA Ranking history ===
As of 1993

Season	Rank	Points	Ref.
1989	204 ▲	0.500	
1990	201 ▲	0.500	
1991	206 ▼	0.500	
1992	216 ▼	0.500	
1993	178 ▲	0.500	

== Current squad ==
As of 16 November 2026

Note: Flags indicate national team as defined under FIFA eligibility rules; some limited exceptions apply. Players may hold more than one non-FIFA nationality.

No.	Pos.	Nation	Player
1	GK	TUR	Göktuğ Baytekin
3	DF	TUR	Ömer Çakı
4	DF	TUR	Yalçın Kılınç
5	MF	TUR	Serkan Odabaşoğlu
7	FW	TUR	Uğur Can
9	FW	TUR	Berk Ünsal
10	FW	TUR	Kerim Frei
11	FW	TUR	İlhan Depe
13	GK	TUR	İbrahim Demir
14	MF	TUR	Hakkı Türker
16	MF	TUR	Abdulkerim Canlı
17	DF	TUR	Salih Sarıkaya
18	FW	TUR	Hasan Bilal
19	FW	TUR	Erdem Dağlı

No.	Pos.	Nation	Player
20	MF	TUR	Muhammet Özbaskıcı (on loan from Samsunspor)
22	FW	TUR	Yasin Eratilla (on loan from Kasımpaşa)
23	DF	TUR	Evren Korkmaz
28	DF	TUR	Özgür Çoban
33	DF	TUR	Gökhan Akkan
37	FW	TUR	Mertcan Açıkgöz
44	MF	TUR	Mert Akoğlu
45	FW	TUR	Yunus Emre Tekerci
66	MF	TUR	Mehmet Baran Barınır
72	GK	TUR	Hüseyin Can Toran
77	DF	TUR	Ayberk Açıkgöz
93	GK	TUR	Yavuz Selim Tantan
94	MF	TUR	Barış Sağır
