= Tokatspor =

Turkish sports club

- Full name: Tokatspor Club Joint Stock Company
- Founded: June 26, 1969
- Ground: Gaziosmanpaşa Stadium
- Capacity: 5,762
- Chairman: Ufuk Akçekaya (last)
- Manager: Metin Altınay (last)
- League: Tokat 1. Amateur League
- Website: http://www.tokatspor.org.tr/
Home colours	Away colours

Tokatspor is a Turkish football club based in Tokat. The club, which has maroon-white colors and was relegated to the Amateur League in the 2020-2021 season.

== Achievements ==
- TFF 2. League:
  - 2 x Runner-up: 1978, 1989
- TFF 3. League:
  - 1 x Champion: 2001, 2008
  - 1 x Play-off Champion: 2006

== League Matches ==
- TFF 1. League: 1980-1983
- TFF 2. League: 1969-1980, 1984-2003, 2006-2007, 2008-2019
- TFF 3. League: 2003-2006, 2007-2008, 2019-2021
- Regional Amateur League: 2021-2022
- Super Amateur League: 1983-1984

== Managers ==
List of Tokatspor managers
