= List of Fenerbahçe S.K. managers =

This is a list of all managers of Fenerbahçe football team, including honours, from 1906-1907 season. From the beginning of the club's official managerial records in 3 May 1907 to the start of the 2025-26 season, Fenerbahçe football team have had 80 full-time managers. (Note: Managers who work interim are not included in this list)

== Honours ==
| Rank | Manager | SL | TC | TSC | PMC | NL | IFL | IS | Total |
|---|---|---|---|---|---|---|---|---|---|
| 1 | (Brazil) Didi | 2 | 1 | 2 | 1 | 0 | 0 | 0 | 6 |
| 2 | (Germany) Christoph Daum | 2 | 0 | 1 | 0 | 0 | 0 | 0 | 3 |
| 4 | (Socialist Federal Republic of Yugoslavia) Todor Veselinović | 2 | 0 | 0 | 3 | 0 | 0 | 0 | 5 |
| 3 | (Turkey) Aykut Kocaman | 1 | 2 | 0 | 0 | 0 | 0 | 0 | 3 |
| 5 | (Socialist Federal Republic of Yugoslavia) Branko Stanković | 1 | 1 | 0 | 2 | 0 | 0 | 0 | 4 |
| 6 | (Socialist Federal Republic of Yugoslavia) Tomislav Kaloperović | 1 | 0 | 0 | 1 | 0 | 0 | 0 | 2 |
| 7 | (Turkey) Mustafa Denizli | 1 | 0 | 0 | 0 | 0 | 0 | 0 | 1 |
| 8 | (Turkey) Ersun Yanal | 1 | 0 | 0 | 0 | 0 | 0 | 0 | 1 |
| 9 | (Brazil) Zico | 1 | 0 | 1 | 0 | 0 | 0 | 0 | 2 |
| 10 | (England) Oscar Hold | 1 | 0 | 0 | 1 | 0 | 0 | 0 | 2 |
| 11 | (Brazil) Parreira | 1 | 0 | 0 | 0 | 0 | 0 | 0 | 1 |
| 12 | (Romania) Traian Ionescu | 1 | 0 | 0 | 0 | 0 | 0 | 0 | 1 |
| 11 | (Portugal) Jorge Jesus | 0 | 1 | 0 | 0 | 0 | 0 | 0 | 1 |
| 12 | (Ottoman Empire) Galip Kulaksızoğlu | 0 | 0 | 0 | 0 | 0 | 3 | 0 | 3 |
| 13 | (Turkey) Necmettin Çakar | 0 | 0 | 0 | 0 | 0 | 1 | 1 | 2 |
| 14 | (Hungary) József Schweng | 0 | 0 | 0 | 0 | 1 | 1 | 1 | 3 |
| 15 | (Republic of Ireland) Jimmy Elliott | 0 | 0 | 0 | 0 | 1 | 1 | 1 | 3 |
| 16 | (Hungary) Sándor Nemes | 0 | 0 | 0 | 0 | 1 | 0 | 0 | 1 |
| 17 | (England) Alexander Prior | 0 | 0 | 0 | 0 | 1 | 1 | 0 | 2 |
| 18 | (Greece) Mitsos Dimitropoulos | 0 | 0 | 0 | 0 | 0 | 1 | 0 | 1 |
| 19 | (Turkey) Fikret Arıcan | 0 | 0 | 0 | 1 | 1 | 1 | 0 | 3 |
| 20 | (England) Peter Molloy | 0 | 0 | 0 | 1 | 1 | 0 | 0 | 2 |
| 21 | (Hungary) László Székely | 1 | 0 | 0 | 0 | 0 | 2 | 0 | 2 |
| | (Socialist Federal Republic of Yugoslavia) Mirko Kokotović | 1 | 0 | 0 | 0 | 0 | 0 | 0 | 1 |
| 22 | (Hungary) Ignác Molnár | 2 | 0 | 0 | 0 | 0 | 1 | 0 | 2 |
| 23 | (Italy) Domenico Tedesco | 0 | 0 | 1 | 0 | 0 | 0 | 0 | 1 |

== Managers ==
| No. | Manager | Period | M | W | D | L | Win % |
|---|---|---|---|---|---|---|---|
| 1 | (Ottoman Empire) Enver Yetiker | 1907 – 1908 | 0 | 0 | 0 | 0 | — |
| 2 | (Ottoman Empire) Hüseyin Dalaklı | 1908 – 1911 | 0 | 0 | 0 | 0 | — |
| 3 | (Ottoman Empire) Galip Kulaksızoğlu | 1911 – 1915 | 0 | 0 | 0 | 0 | — |
| 4 | (Ottoman Empire) Fuad Hüsnü Kayacan | 1915 – 1921 | 0 | 0 | 0 | 0 | — |
| 5 | (Ottoman Empire) Mustafa Elkatipzade | 1921 – 1924 | 0 | 0 | 0 | 0 | — |
| 6 | (Turkey) Hüseyin Sami Coşar (İşbay) | 1924 – 1926 | 0 | 0 | 0 | 0 | — |
| 7 | (Turkey) Hikmet Mocuk | 1926 – 1929 | 0 | 0 | 0 | 0 | — |
| 8 | (Turkey) Necmettin Çakar | 1929 – 1932 | 0 | 0 | 0 | 0 | — |
| 9 | (Hungary) József Schweng | 5 June 1932 – 18 May 1934 | 0 | 0 | 0 | 0 | — |
| 10 | (Republic of Ireland) James Donnelly | 27 May 1934 – 22 March 1938 | 0 | 0 | 0 | 0 | — |
| 11 | (Hungary) József Schweng | 9 July 1938 – 17 November 1939 | 0 | 0 | 0 | 0 | — |
| 12 | (Hungary) Sándor Nemes | 16 December 1939 – 7 February 1941 | 0 | 0 | 0 | 0 | — |
| 13 | (England) John Jack Prayer | 26 February 1940 – 23 May 1944 | 0 | 0 | 0 | 0 | — |
| 14 | (Greece) (Ottoman Empire) Mitsos Dimitropoulos | 2 July 1944 – 14 February 1945 | 0 | 0 | 0 | 0 | — |
| 15 | (Turkey) Fikret Arıcan | 6 March 1945 – 28 June 1947 | 0 | 0 | 0 | 0 | — |
| 16 | (Hungary) Ignác Molnár | 1 July 1947 – 30 June 1948 | 0 | 0 | 0 | 0 | — |
| 17 | (Turkey) Cihat Arman | 1 July 1948 – 30 June 1949 | 0 | 0 | 0 | 0 | — |
| 18 | (England) Peter Molloy | 19 July 1949 – 27 June 1950 | 0 | 0 | 0 | 0 | — |
| 21 | (England) Jimmy McCormick | 3 July 1950 – 9 August 1951 | 0 | 0 | 0 | 0 | — |
| 19 | (Hungary) László Székely | 15 August 1951 – 30 June 1953 | 0 | 0 | 0 | 0 | — |
| 20 | (Socialist Federal Republic of Yugoslavia) Žarko Mihajlović | 8 October 1953 – 30 June 1955 | 0 | 0 | 0 | 0 | — |
| 21 | (Hungary) László Székely | 22 September 1956 – 30 June 1957 | 0 | 0 | 0 | 0 | — |
| 22 | (Hungary) Ignác Molnár | 1 July 1957 – 13 January 1960 | 0 | 0 | 0 | 0 | — |
| 23 | (Hungary) László Székely | 19 January 1960 – 30 June 1962 | 0 | 0 | 0 | 0 | — |
| 24 | (Croatia) Mirko Kokotović | 1 July 1962 – 30 June 1964 | 0 | 0 | 0 | 0 | — |
| 25 | (England) Oscar Hold | 1 July 1964 – 10 July 1965 | 0 | 0 | 0 | 0 | — |
| 26 | (Socialist Federal Republic of Yugoslavia) Abdulah Gegić | 1 July 1966 – 30 June 1967 | 0 | 0 | 0 | 0 | — |
| 27 | (Hungary) Ignác Molnár | 1 July 1967 – 30 June 1969 | 0 | 0 | 0 | 0 | — |
| 28 | (Romania) Traian Ionescu | 1 July 1969 – 30 June 1970 | 0 | 0 | 0 | 0 | — |
| 29 | (Romania) Constantin Teașcă | 1 July 1970 – 30 June 1971 | 0 | 0 | 0 | 0 | — |
| 30 | (Turkey) Sabri Kiraz | 1 July 1971 – 30 June 1972 | 0 | 0 | 0 | 0 | — |
| 31 | (Brazil) Didi | 1 July 1972 – 30 June 1975 | 139 | 72 | 45 | 22 | 51.80 |
| 32 | (Turkey) Necdet Niş | 1 July 1975 – 31 December 1976 | 0 | 0 | 0 | 0 | — |
| 33 | (Socialist Federal Republic of Yugoslavia) Abdulah Gegić | 1 July 1975 – 30 June 1976 | 32 | 14 | 13 | 5 | 43.75 |
| 34 | (Socialist Federal Republic of Yugoslavia) Tomislav Kaloperović | 1 October 1976 – 30 June 1978 | 0 | 0 | 0 | 0 | — |
| 35 | (Turkey) Necdet Niş | 1 July 1978 – 30 June 1979 | 45 | 22 | 11 | 12 | 48.89 |
| 36 | (Turkey) Şükrü Ersoy | 1 July 1979 – 5 November 1979 | 13 | 4 | 3 | 6 | 30.77 |
| 37 | (Turkey) Ziya Şengül | 6 November 1979 – 1 June 1980 | 26 | 11 | 13 | 2 | 42.31 |
| 38 | (Germany) Friedel Rausch | 1 July 1980 – 31 March 1982 | 75 | 29 | 24 | 22 | 38.67 |
| 39 | (Socialist Federal Republic of Yugoslavia) Branko Stanković | 1 July 1982 – 30 June 1984 | 100 | 51 | 32 | 17 | 51.00 |
| 40 | (Socialist Federal Republic of Yugoslavia) Todor Veselinović | 1 July 1984 – 30 June 1985 | 48 | 24 | 18 | 6 | 50.00 |
| 41 | (Hungary) Kálmán Mészöly | 1 July 1985 – 30 June 1986 | 46 | 16 | 19 | 11 | 34.78 |
| 42 | (Socialist Federal Republic of Yugoslavia) Branko Stanković | 1 July 1986 – 30 June 1987 | 39 | 16 | 14 | 9 | 41.03 |
| 43 | (Hungary) Pál Csernai | 1 October 1987 – 30 June 1988 | 38 | 16 | 10 | 12 | 42.11 |
| 44 | (Socialist Federal Republic of Yugoslavia) Todor Veselinović | 1 July 1988 – 30 June 1990 | 90 | 59 | 10 | 21 | 65.56 |
| 45 | (Netherlands) Guus Hiddink | 1 July 1990 – 30 June 1991 | 29 | 13 | 7 | 9 | 44.83 |
| 46 | (Turkey) Tınaz Tırpan | 1 August 1991 – 31 August 1991 | 1 | 0 | 1 | 0 | 0.00 |
| 47 | (Slovakia) Jozef Vengloš | 1 September 1991 – 30 June 1993 | 69 | 45 | 8 | 16 | 65.22 |
| 48 | (Germany) Holger Osieck | 1 July 1993 – 18 December 1994 | 54 | 34 | 10 | 10 | 62.96 |
| 49 | (Croatia) Tomislav Ivić | 19 December 1994 – 30 June 1995 | 21 | 13 | 4 | 4 | 61.90 |
| 50 | (Brazil) Parreira | 1 July 1995 – 30 June 1996 | 45 | 31 | 9 | 5 | 68.89 |
| 51 | (Brazil) Lazaroni | 1 July 1996 – 30 June 1997 | 31 | 17 | 8 | 6 | 54.84 |
| 52 | (Socialist Federal Republic of Yugoslavia) Todor Veselinović | 7 February 1997 – 30 June 1997 | 15 | 9 | 2 | 4 | 60.00 |
| 53 | (Croatia) Otto Barić | 1 July 1997 – 30 June 1998 | 37 | 21 | 9 | 7 | 56.76 |
| 54 | (Germany) Joachim Löw | 1 July 1998 – 30 June 1999 | 38 | 24 | 6 | 8 | 63.16 |
| 55 | (Turkey) Rıdvan Dilmen | 5 August 1999 – 1 October 1999 | 7 | 3 | 3 | 1 | 42.86 |
| 56 | (Czech Republic) Zdeněk Zeman | 12 October 1999 – 30 June 2000 | 11 | 3 | 5 | 3 | 27.27 |
| 57 | (Turkey) Turhan Sofuoğlu | 1 July 1999 – 30 June 2000 | 19 | 11 | 3 | 5 | 57.89 |
| 58 | (Turkey) Mustafa Denizli | 1 July 2000 – 2 June 2002 | 66 | 41 | 6 | 19 | 62.12 |
| 59 | (Germany) Werner Lorant | 3 January 2002 – 9 December 2002 | 39 | 23 | 8 | 8 | 58.97 |
| 60 | (Turkey) Oğuz Çetin | 10 December 2002 – 6 April 2003 | 9 | 1 | 5 | 3 | 11.11 |
| 61 | (Turkey) Tamer Güney | 10 April – 30 June 2003 | 9 | 1 | 5 | 3 | 11.11 |
| 62 | (Germany) Christoph Daum | 1 July 2003 – 30 June 2006 | 134 | 90 | 17 | 27 | 67.16 |
| 63 | (Brazil) Zico | 1 July 2006 – 30 June 2008 | 106 | 63 | 27 | 16 | 59.43 |
| 64 | (Spain) Luis Aragonés | 1 July 2008 – 30 June 2009 | 53 | 28 | 11 | 14 | 52.83 |
| 65 | (Germany) Christoph Daum | 1 July 2009 – 25 June 2010 | 56 | 36 | 9 | 11 | 64.29 |
| 66 | (Turkey) Aykut Kocaman | 26 June 2010 – 28 May 2013 | 151 | 91 | 30 | 30 | 60.26 |
| 67 | (Turkey) Ersun Yanal | 28 June 2013 – 8 August 2014 | 40 | 24 | 6 | 10 | 60.00 |
| 68 | (Turkey) İsmail Kartal | 1 July 2014 – 30 May 2015 | 46 | 30 | 10 | 6 | 65.22 |
| 69 | (Portugal) Vítor Pereira | 1 July 2015 – 11 August 2016 | 61 | 37 | 15 | 9 | 60.66 |
| 70 | (Netherlands) Dick Advocaat | 16 August 2016 – 30 June 2017 | 55 | 30 | 15 | 10 | 54.55 |
| 71 | (Turkey) Aykut Kocaman | 1 July 2017 – 18 June 2018 | 46 | 28 | 11 | 7 | 60.87 |
| 72 | (Netherlands) Phillip Cocu | 1 July 2018 – 28 October 2018 | 15 | 3 | 5 | 7 | 20.00 |
| int | (Netherlands) Erwin Koeman | 29 October 2018 – 13 December 2018 | 9 | 3 | 3 | 3 | 33.33 |
| 73 | (Turkey) Ersun Yanal | 14 December 2018 – 4 March 2020 | 56 | 27 | 15 | 14 | 48.21 |
| int | (Turkey) Zeki Murat Göle | 5 March 2020 – 8 June 2020 | 2 | 0 | 1 | 1 | 0.00 |
| int | (Turkey) Tahir Karapınar | 9 June 2020 – 31 July 2020 | 9 | 4 | 1 | 4 | 44.44 |
| 74 | (Turkey) Erol Bulut | 5 August 2020 – 25 March 2021 | 34 | 21 | 5 | 8 | 61.76 |
| 75 | (Turkey) Emre Belözoğlu | 25 March 2021 – 30 June 2021 | 10 | 7 | 2 | 1 | 70.00 |
| 76 | (Portugal) Vítor Pereira | 2 July 2021 – 20 December 2021 | 25 | 11 | 7 | 7 | 44.00 |
| int | (Turkey) Zeki Murat Göle | 21 December 2021 – 12 January 2022 | 4 | 2 | 1 | 1 | 50.00 |
| 77 | (Turkey) İsmail Kartal | 13 January 2022 – 30 June 2022 | 21 | 12 | 5 | 4 | 57.14 |
| 78 | (Portugal) Jorge Jesus | 1 July 2022 – 30 June 2023 | 52 | 35 | 10 | 7 | 67.31 |
| 79 | (Turkey) İsmail Kartal | 3 July 2023 – 31 May 2024 | 58 | 44 | 7 | 7 | 75.86 |
| 80 | (Portugal) José Mourinho | 2 June 2024 – 29 August 2025 | 62 | 37 | 14 | 11 | 59.68 |
| int | (Turkey) Zeki Murat Göle | 29 August 2025 – 9 September 2025 | 1 | 1 | 0 | 0 | 100.00 |
| 81 | (Italy) Domenico Tedesco | 9 September 2025 – 27 April 2026 | 45 | 26 | 12 | 7 | 57.78 |
| int | (Turkey) Zeki Murat Göle | 27 April 2026 – 18 May 2026 | 3 | 2 | 1 | 0 | 66.67 |
| 82 | (Turkey) İsmail Kartal | 21 July 2026 – 27 October 2026 | 18 | 9 | 5 | 4 | 50.00 |
| int | (Netherlands) Dirk Kuyt | 27 October 2026 – 3 November 2026 | 2 | 1 | 0 | 1 | 50.00 |
| 83 | (Turkey) Emre Belözoğlu | 3 November 2026 – present | 1 | 1 | 0 | 0 | 100.00 |
