= 1989 Turkish Cup final =

Association football match

The 1989 Turkish Cup final was a football match played over two legs in June 1989. It was the final and deciding match of the 1988–89 Turkish Cup. Les Ferdinand scored the winning goal to win Besiktas the cup.

== First leg ==
21 June 1989
17:00

Fenerbahçe	0 – 1	Beşiktaş
		Ferdinand 15'

Fenerbahçe Stadium, Istanbul
Referee: Özcan Oal

FENERBAHÇE:
1	(Germany) Toni Schumacher
2	(Turkey) İsmail Kartal	Booked
3	(Turkey) Nezihi Tosuncuk	Booked
4	(Turkey) Müjdat Yetkiner
5	(Turkey) Şenol Ustaömer
6	(Turkey) Turhan Sofuoğlu		(substituted off) 63'
7	(Turkey) Oğuz Çetin
8	(Turkey) Serdar Şenkaya		(substituted off) 63'
9	(Turkey) Rıdvan Dilmen
10	(Turkey) Hasan Vezir
11	(Turkey) Aykut Kocaman
Substitutes
12	(Turkey) Bilal Şar		(substituted on) 63'
13	(Turkey) Ergin Parlar	Booked	(substituted on) 63'
14	(Turkey) Taygun Erdem
15	(Turkey) Can Barhan
16
Manager:
(Socialist Federal Republic of Yugoslavia) Todor Veselinović

BEŞİKTAŞ:
1	(Socialist Federal Republic of Yugoslavia) Rade Zalad
2	(Turkey) Recep Çetin
3	(Turkey) Kadir Akbulut	(yellow card) 70'
4	(Turkey) Gökhan Keskin
5	(Turkey) Ulvi Güveneroğlu
6	(Turkey) Metin Tekin		(substituted off) 77'
7	(Turkey) Zeki Önatlı		(substituted off) 51'
8	(Turkey) Rıza Çalımbay
9	(Turkey) Mehmet Özdilek	Booked
10	(Turkey) Ali Gültiken
11	(England) Les Ferdinand
Substitutes
12	(Turkey) Feyyaz Uçar		(substituted on) 77'
13	(Turkey) Şenol Fidan		(substituted on) 51'
14	(Turkey) Metin Akçevre
15	(Turkey) İsmail Taviş
16	(Turkey) Halim Okta
Manager:
(England) Gordon Milne

Man of the Match:

Referee:
(Turkey) Özcan Oal
Assistant Referee:
(Turkey) Taner Yalçındağ
(Turkey) Argun Darıcı

== Second leg ==
25 June 1989
16:30

Beşiktaş	2 – 1	Fenerbahçe
Ali 73'; Feyyaz 86'		Oğuz 46'

BJK İnönü Stadium, Istanbul
Referee: İhsan Türe

BEŞİKTAŞ:
1	(Socialist Federal Republic of Yugoslavia) Rade Zalad
2	(Turkey) Recep Çetin
3	(Turkey) Gökhan Keskin	Booked
4	(Turkey) Ulvi Güveneroğlu
5	(Turkey) Bünyamin Süral	Booked
6	(Turkey) Mehmet Özdilek
7	(Turkey) Rıza Çalımbay
8	(Turkey) Şenol Fidan
9	(Turkey) Metin Tekin	(substituted off) 73'
10	(England) Les Ferdinand	Booked
11	(Turkey) Feyyaz Uçar
Substitutes
12	(Turkey) Ali Gültiken	(substituted on) 73'
13	(Turkey) Metin Akçevre
14	(Turkey) Turan Uzun
15	(Turkey) İsmail Taviş
16	(Turkey) Halim Okta
Manager:
(England) Gordon Milne

FENERBAHÇE:
1	(Germany) Toni Schumacher
2	(Turkey) İsmail Kartal	Booked
3	(Turkey) Nezihi Tosuncuk	Booked
4	(Turkey) Müjdat Yetkiner
5	(Turkey) Şenol Ustaömer
6	(Turkey) Turhan Sofuoğlu
7	(Turkey) Serdar Şenkaya		(substituted off) 79'
8	(Turkey) Oğuz Çetin
9	(Turkey) Hakan Tecimer		(substituted off) 62'
10	(Turkey) Rıdvan Dilmen
11	(Turkey) Aykut Kocaman
Substitutes
12	(Turkey) Taygun Erdem		(substituted on) 79'
13	(Turkey) Bilal Şar		(substituted on) 62'
14	(Turkey) Can Barhan
15	(Turkey) Ergin Parlar
16	(Turkey) Batur Altıparmak
Manager:
(Socialist Federal Republic of Yugoslavia) Todor Veselinović

Man of the match:

Referee:
(Turkey) İhsan Türe
Assistant Referee:
(Turkey) Hüseyin Su
(Turkey) Ahmet Erdoğan
