= 1988–89 Turkish Cup =

Türkiye Kupası

Tournament details
- Country: Turkey
- Teams: 71

Final positions
- Champions: Beşiktaş (2nd title)
- Runners-up: Fenerbahçe

Tournament statistics
- Matches played: 101
- Goals scored: 338 (3.35 per match)
- Top goal scorer(s): Ali Gültiken (8 goals)

The 1988–89 Turkish Cup was the 27th edition of the annual tournament that determined the association football Süper Lig Turkish Cup (Turkish: Türkiye Kupası) champion under the auspices of the Turkish Football Federation (Turkish: Türkiye Futbol Federasyonu; TFF). Beşiktaş successfully contested Fenerbahçe 1–3 in the final. The results of the tournament also determined which clubs would be promoted or relegated.

== First round ==
Team 1	Score	Team 2
Gençlerbirliği	5–1	Çorumspor
Batman Petrolspor	0–1	Elazığspor
Mardinspor	0–1	Siirt YSE Spor
Sönmez Filamentspor	1–2	İnegölspor
Çarşambaspor	1–0	Giresunspor
Hatayspor	0–1	Gaziantepspor
Kayserispor	2–1	Elbistanspor
Seydişehir Eti Alüminyumspor	2–1	Alanyaspor
Antalyaspor	5–2	Denizlispor
Aydınspor	3–1	Altınordu
Bakırköyspor	8–0	Vefa
Beşiktaş (AM)	3–0	Bayrampaşa
Erdemir Ereğlispor	0–0 (4–3 p)	Karabükspor
Kartalspor	3–2	Beykozspor
Kocaelispor	3–1	Zonguldakspor
Kuşadasıspor	2–0	Göztepe
Kütahyaspor	1–2	Tavşanlı Linyitspor
Tekirdağspor	1–2	Ayvalıkgücü
Uzunköprüspor	0–0 (5–4 p)	Bigaspor
Yeni Salihlispor	3–2	Turgutluspor
Zeytinburnu	6–4 (aet)	Gaziosmanpaşa
PTT	3–0	1930 Bafraspor
Bursaspor (AM)	3–0	Gönenspor
Ankara Demirspor	1–0	Polatlıspor
Petrol Ofisi	3–2	Nevşehirspor
Erzurumspor	5–1	Orduspor

== Second round ==
Team 1	Score	Team 2
Petrol Ofisi	1–3	Ankara Demirspor
Elazığspor	1–1 (3–4 p)	Siirt YSE Spor
Çarşambaspor	2–0	Erzurumspor
Kayserispor	2–1	Gaziantepspor
Seydişehir Eti Alüminyumspor	6–2	Antalyaspor
Ayvalıkgücü	2–1	Uzunköprüspor
Bakırköyspor	6–4 (aet)	Kartalspor
Beşiktaş (AM)	4–4 (4–2 p)	Zeytinburnu
Bursaspor (AM)	4–2 (aet)	İnegölspor
Kocaelispor	3–1	Erdemir Ereğlispor
Kuşadasıspor	4–0	Aydınspor
PTT	1–0	Gençlerbirliği
Yeni Salihlispor	1–2 (aet)	Tavşanlı Linyitspor

== Third round ==
Team 1	Agg.	Team 2	1st leg	2nd leg
Adana Demirspor	6–1	Seydişehir Eti Alüminyumspor	4–0	2–1
Adanaspor	7–1	Rizespor	4–1	3–0
Boluspor	6–2	PTT	3–1	3–1
Bursaspor (AM)	3–5	Ankaragücü	1–2	2–3
Kahramanmaraşspor	2–3	Bursaspor	1–2	1–1
Malatyaspor	2–0	Ankara Demirspor	0–0	2–0
Samsunspor	0–6	Bakırköyspor	0–3	0–3
Siirt YSE Spor	2–3	Konyaspor	1–1	1–2
Altay	4–4 (a)	Kocaelispor	2–3	2–1
Ayvalıkgücü	1–6	Galatasaray	0–1	1–5
Çarşambaspor	0–3	Karşıyaka	0–1	0–2
Fenerbahçe	6–1	Kuşadasıspor	5–1	1–0
Kayserispor	1–3	Eskişehirspor	0–1	1–2
Sakaryaspor	2–4	Trabzonspor	2–1	0–3
Tavşanlı Linyitspor	0–6	Sarıyer	0–4	0–2
Beşiktaş	9–1	Beşiktaş (AM)	4–0	5–1

== Fourth round ==
Team 1	Agg.	Team 2	1st leg	2nd leg
Malatyaspor	3–0	Adana Demirspor	1–0	2–2
Trabzonspor	2–3	Fenerbahçe	1–0	1–3
Adanaspor	1–2	Bakırköyspor	1–0	0–2
Beşiktaş	4–1	Kocaelispor	2–1	2–0
Bursaspor	2–5	Galatasaray	0–1	2–4
Karşıyaka	7–3	Ankaragücü	4–1	3–2
Sarıyer	1–1 (a)	Boluspor	0–0	1–1
Konyaspor	6–5	Eskişehirspor	2–3	4–2

== Quarter-finals ==
Team 1	Agg.	Team 2	1st leg	2nd leg
Fenerbahçe	6–5	Galatasaray	2–2	4–3
Malatyaspor	5–1	Bakırköyspor	2–0	3–1
Konyaspor	3–2	Sarıyer	3–2	0–0
Karşıyaka	0–4	Beşiktaş	0–3	0–1

== Semi-finals ==
=== Summary table ===
Team 1	Agg.	Team 2	1st leg	2nd leg
Fenerbahçe	2–2 (a)	Malatyaspor	1–0	1–2
Konyaspor	2–5	Beşiktaş	1–2	1–3

=== 1st leg ===
7 June 1989 Semi-final	Fenerbahçe	1–0	Malatyaspor	Istanbul
17:00 EEST (UTC+03)	Oğuz 59'			Stadium: Fenerbahçe Stadium; Referee: Oğuz Sarvan

7 June 1989 Semi-final	Konyaspor	1–2	Beşiktaş	Konya
17:00 EEST (UTC+03)	Cemal 24'		Metin 3'; Kadir 57'	Stadium: Konya Şehir Stadyumu; Referee: Hasan Ceylan

=== 2nd leg ===
18 June 1989 Semi-final	Beşiktaş	3–1	Konyaspor	Istanbul
17:00 EEST (UTC+03)	Ulvi 4'; Ferdinand 21'; Ali 42'		Fuat 69'	Stadium: BJK İnönü Stadium; Referee: Engin Kurt

18 June 1989 Semi-final	Malatyaspor	2–1	Fenerbahçe	Malatya
17:00 EEST (UTC+03)	Feyzullah 76', 80'		Serdar 69'	Stadium: Malatya İnönü Stadium; Referee: Ahmet Akçay

== Final ==
=== 1st leg ===
21 June 1989 Final	Fenerbahçe	0–1	Beşiktaş	Istanbul, Turkey
17:00 EEST (UTC+03)			Ferdinand 15'	Stadium: Şükrü Saracoğlu Stadium; Referee: Özcan Oal

=== 2nd leg ===
25 June 1989 Final	Beşiktaş	2–1	Fenerbahçe	Istanbul, Turkey
16:30 EEST (UTC+03)	Ali 76'; Feyyaz 86'		Oğuz 46'	Stadium: BJK İnönü Stadium; Referee: İhsan Türe
