= Zeki Murat Göle =

Turkish association football manager

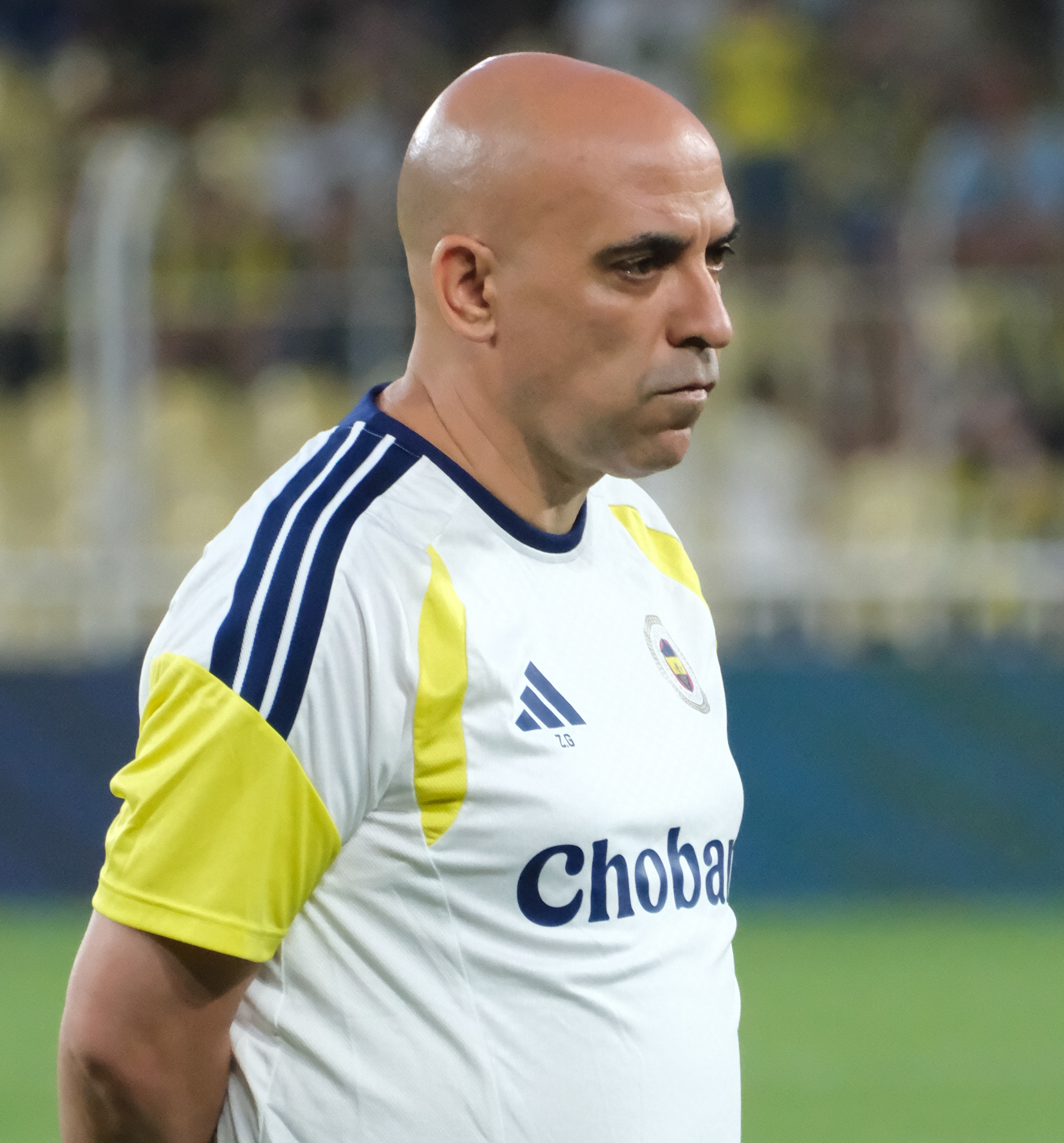

Personal information
- Full name: Zeki Murat Göle
- Date of birth: 26 September 1979 (age 47)
- Place of birth: Istanbul, Turkey

Managerial career
- Years: Team
- 2008–2010: Fenerbahçe U18 (assistant)
- 2010–2013: Fenerbahçe U21 (assistant)
- 2013–2014: Fenerbahçe U16
- 2014: Fenerbahçe U17
- 2014–2026: Fenerbahçe (assistant)
- 2020: Fenerbahçe (caretaker)
- 2021–2022: Fenerbahçe (caretaker)
- 2025: Fenerbahçe (caretaker)
- 2026: Fenerbahçe (caretaker)

Zeki Murat Göle (born 26 September 1979 in Istanbul, Turkey) is a Turkish football coach.

== Education ==
Göle graduated in Marmara University about physical education.

== Career ==
During his time in office at Fenerbahçe, Göle assisted İsmail Kartal (2014–15 and 2023–24), Vítor Pereira (2015–16 and 2021), Dick Advocaat (2016–17), Aykut Kocaman (2017–18), Philip Cocu (2018), Erwin Koeman (2018), Ersun Yanal (2018–2020), Erol Bulut (2020–21), Emre Belözoğlu (2021), Jorge Jesus (2022–23), José Mourinho (2024–25) and Domenico Tedesco during the 2025–26 season.

He also coached Fenerbahçe as the caretaker manager in 2019–20 and 2021–22 seasons. In April 2026, he was appointed as caretaker manager following the sacking of Tedesco for the remainder of the 2025–26 season.
