= List of Khazar Lankaran FK managers =

This is a list of all managers of Khazar Lankaran FK, including performance records and honours.

Khazar Lankaran had many managers and head coaches throughout their history, below is a chronological list of them from when Azerbaijan Premier League was changed into a league format.

The most successful Khazar manager in terms of trophies won is Agaselim Mirjavadov, who won Azerbaijan Premier League title, two Azerbaijan Cups and CIS Cup trophies in his 3-year reign as manager.

== Statistics ==
Information correct as of match played 13 April 2014. Only competitive matches are counted.

- (n/a) = Information not available

Name	Nat.	From	To	P	W	D	L	GS	GA	%W	Honours	Notes
Nazim Suleymanov	Azerbaijan	2004	2004	17	9	4	4	0	0	52.94		
Rasim Kara	Turkey	2004	2005	54	33	8	13	0	0	61.11		
Şenol Fidan (Interim)	Turkey	2005	2005	3	1	0	2	0	0	33.33		
Viktor Pasulko	Ukraine	Feb 2006	Jun 2006	17	9	7	1	0	0	52.94		
Agaselim Mirjavadov	Azerbaijan	Jul 2006	Jun 2008	68	41	19	8	143	53	60.29	Azerbaijan Premier League; Azerbaijan Cup (2); CIS Cup	
Rasim Kara	Turkey	Jul 2008	Dec 2008	17	10	2	5	0	0	58.82		
Hafiz Aliyev (Interim)	Azerbaijan	2009	2009	1	0	1	0	0	0	0.00		
Igor Ponomaryov	Azerbaijan	2009	2009	15	7	4	4	0	0	46.67		
Agaselim Mirjavadov	Azerbaijan	2009	Jun 2010	51	28	13	10	0	0	54.90		
Mircea Rednic	Romania	Jul 2010	Dec 2011	56	28	19	9	0	0	50.00	Azerbaijan Cup	
Cüneyt Biçer	Turkey	Dec 2011	Mar 2012	9	5	1	3	0	0	55.56		
Yunis Huseinov	Azerbaijan	Mar 2012	Oct 2012	24	8	10	6	0	0	33.33		
Emin Guliyev (Interim)	Azerbaijan	Oct 2012	Nov 2012	1	1	0	0	0	0	100.00		
Carles Martorell Baqués	Spain	Nov 2012	Feb 2013	11	3	3	5	0	0	27.27		
Emin Guliyev (Interim)	Azerbaijan	Feb 2013	Mar 2013	4	2	1	1	0	0	50.00		
John Toshack	Wales	May 2013	Nov 2013	27	8	8	11	0	0	29.63	Azerbaijan Supercup	
Giovanni Melchiorre (Interim)	Italy	Nov 2013	Dec 2013	1	0	0	1	0	3	0.00		
Mustafa Denizli	Turkey	Dec 2013	May 2014	16	6	6	4	21	19	37.50		
Oğuz Çetin	Turkey	June 2014	2016	0	0	0	0	0	0	—		

- Notes:

P – Total of played matches W – Won matches D – Drawn matches L – Lost matches GS – Goal scored GA – Goals against
%W – Percentage of matches won

Nationality is indicated by the corresponding FIFA country code(s).
