= Özkan Karabulut =

Turkish footballer

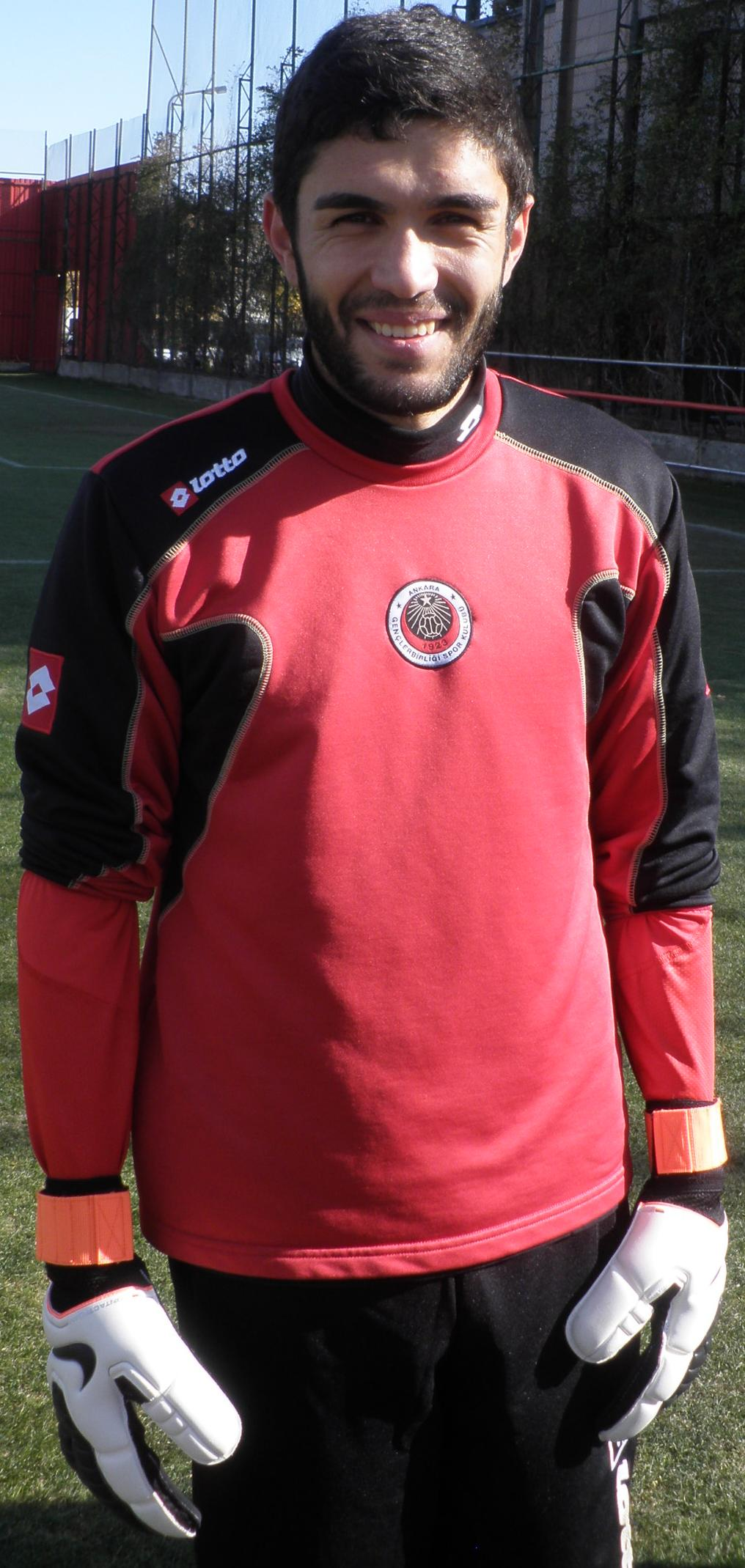

Personal information
- Date of birth: 16 January 1991 (age 35)
- Place of birth: Ankara, Turkey
- Height: 1.86 m (6 ft 1 in)
- Position: Goalkeeper

Team information
- Current team: Erbaaspor
- Number: 27

Youth career
- 2001–2007: Gençlerbirliği

Senior career*
| Years | Team | Apps | (Gls) |
| 2007–2016 | Gençlerbirliği | 18 | (0) |
| 2013–2014 | → Ankaraspor (loan) | 1 | (0) |
| 2014–2015 | → Boluspor (loan) | 28 | (0) |
| 2016 | → Boluspor (loan) | 0 | (0) |
| 2016–2017 | Keçiörengücü | 5 | (0) |
| 2017–2020 | Kahramanmaraşspor | 67 | (0) |
| 2020–2021 | Etimesgut Belediyespor | 35 | (0) |
| 2021–2024 | 1461 Trabzon FK | 78 | (0) |
| 2024–2025 | Sarıyer | 17 | (0) |
| 2025 | Menemen | 3 | (0) |
| 2025– | Erbaaspor | 6 | (0) |

International career
| 2007 | Turkey U16 | 1 | (0) |
| 2010 | Turkey U19 | 3 | (0) |
| 2010 | Turkey U20 | 1 | (0) |
| 2010–2012 | Turkey U21 | 15 | (0) |
| 2012 | Turkey A2 | 2 | (0) |
- * Club domestic league appearances and goals as of 8 November 2025

Özkan Karabulut (born 16 January 1991) is a Turkish professional footballer who plays as a goalkeeper for TFF 2. Lig club Erbaaspor. Özkan made his professional debut for Gençlerbirliği against Gaziantepspor at Gaziantep Kamil Ocak Stadium on 8 May 2010.
