= Fatih Kamaçi =

Dutch footballer (born 1989)

Personal information
- Full name: Fatih Kamaçi
- Date of birth: 23 May 1989 (age 37)
- Place of birth: Waalwijk, Netherlands
- Height: 1.77 m (5 ft 10 in)
- Position: Attacking midfielder

Team information
- Current team: Dongen
- Number: 10

Youth career
- RKC Waalwijk

Senior career*
| Years | Team | Apps | (Gls) |
| 2009–2014 | Dongen | | |
| 2014–2018 | FC Oss | 137 | (36) |
| 2018–2019 | Gümüşhanespor | 8 | (1) |
| 2019–2020 | Kahramanmaraşspor | 40 | (4) |
| 2020– | Dongen | 54 | (25) |
- * Club domestic league appearances and goals as of 8 November 2024

Fatih Kamaçi (born 23 May 1989) is a Dutch footballer who plays as an attacking midfielder for Vierde Divisie club Dongen.
