= Taylan Aydoğan =

German football goalkeeper (b.1983)

Personal information
- Date of birth: May 27, 1983 (age 43)
- Place of birth: Aachen, West Germany
- Height: 1.87 m (6 ft 1 1/2 in)
- Position: Goalkeeper

Youth career
- –2001: Fenerbahçe
- 2001–2003: Roda JC

Senior career*
Years	Team	Apps	(Gls)
2003–2005	Roda JC	0	(0)
2005–2010	Malatyaspor	29	(0)
2006–2007	→ Kocaelispor (loan)	11	(0)
2007–2008	→ İzmirspor (loan)	5	(0)
2010–2011	Yeni Malatyaspor	14	(0)
2011–2013	Kahramanmaraşspor	61	(0)
2013–2014	Hatayspor	4	(0)
2014	Tarsus Idman Yurdu	15	(0)
2014–2015	Fethiyespor	2	(0)
2015	Denizli Belediyespor	16	(0)
2015–2016	Bayburt Grup Özel İdarespor	19	(0)
2016–2017	Çine Madranspor	15	(0)
2017–2018	SV Ditib Solingen	5	(0)
- * Club domestic league appearances and goals

Taylan Aydoğan (born 27 May 1983 in Aachen, West Germany) is a German former football goalkeeper.

== Club career ==
He became professional in Fenerbahçe. Taylan joined in Roda JC at the beginning of the season 2001/2002. He played for youth and reserves teams of this club.

Taylan transferred to Malatyaspor in 2004. He made his debut for Malatyaspor on February 22, 2006 in the Turkish Cup game against Giresunspor. Taylan also played for Kocaelispor and İzmirspor on loan. Taylan moved to Yeni Malatyaspor in 2010, but played very infrequently.

At the beginning of the 2011/12 season, Taylan signed a contract with Kahramanmaraşspor. Currently, he plays in the TFF Second League for this club. He is the captain of Kahramanmaraşspor.
