= Bayram Çetin =

Turkish footballer

Personal information
- Full name: Bayram Çetin
- Date of birth: July 17, 1985 (age 41)
- Place of birth: Uşak, Turkey
- Height: 1.87 m (6 ft 2 in)
- Position: Centre back

Team information
- Current team: Kahramanmaraşspor
- Number: 35

Youth career
- 1997–2000: Uşakspor
- 2000–2002: Mersinli Şimşekspor
- 2002–2004: İzmirspor

Senior career*
Years	Team	Apps	(Gls)
2004–2005	Torbalispor		
2005	İzmirspor	2	(0)
2005–2006	Akseki Aroma Gençlik	13	(0)
2006–2008	Altınordu	68	(6)
2008–2010	Kayserispor	12	(0)
2010–2011	Göztepe	5	(0)
2011–2012	Altınordu	28	(1)
2012–2013	İnegölspor	30	(0)
2013–2015	Aydınspor 1923	59	(3)
2015–2017	Fethiyespor	58	(10)
2017–2020	Afjet Afyonspor	76	(0)
2020–	Kahramanmaraşspor	4	(0)
- * Club domestic league appearances and goals as of 17:58, 9 March 2020 (UTC)

Bayram Çetin (born July 17, 1985 in Germany) is a Turkish professional footballer who plays for Kahramanmaraşspor.

== Career ==
=== Kahramanmaraşspor ===
On 27 January 2020 it was confirmed, that Çetin had joined TFF Second League club Kahramanmaraşspor.
