= Şenol Ustaömer =

Turkish footballer

Personal information
- Date of birth: 18 August 1961 (age 65)
- Place of birth: Trabzon, Turkey
- Position: Leftback

Senior career*
Years	Team	Apps	(Gls)
1980-1988	Trabzonspor	51	(8)
1988-1993	Fenerbahce	80	(10)

International career
1984-1985	Turkey	3	(0)
- * Club domestic league appearances and goals

Şenol Ustaömer (born 18 August 1961) is a former Turkish footballer.

== International career ==
Ustaömer was the U19 Turkey coach.

== Honours ==
Fenerbahçe

- Süper Lig: 1988–89
