= Rade Zalad =

Serbian footballer

Personal information
- Date of birth: 26 October 1956 (age 70)
- Place of birth: Kačarevo, PR Serbia, FPR Yugoslavia
- Position: Goalkeeper

Youth career
- Jedinstvo Kačarevo
- 1970–1974: Partizan

Senior career*
Years	Team	Apps	(Gls)
1974–1984	Partizan	69	(0)
1984–1985	Budućnost Titograd	32	(0)
1985–1986	Priština	25	(0)
1986–1987	Eskişehirspor	35	(0)
1987–1989	Beşiktaş	73	(0)
1989–1993	Ankaragücü	95	(0)
Total		329	(0)

International career
1978	Yugoslavia U21	2	(0)
Medal record
Gold medal – first place	UEFA Under-21 Championship	1978
- * Club domestic league appearances and goals

Rade Zalad (Serbian Cyrillic: Раде Залад; born 26 October 1956) is a Serbian retired footballer who played as a goalkeeper.

== Club career ==
After coming through the youth system at Partizan, Zalad signed his first professional contract with the club in 1974. He made his competitive debut for Partizan in the 1978–79 season. After helping the club win the championship in 1982–83, Zalad completely lost his place in the squad and went on to play for Budućnost Titograd (1984–85) and Priština (1985–86).

In 1986, Zalad moved abroad to Turkey and signed with Eskişehirspor. He later played for Beşiktaş (1987–1989) and Ankaragücü (1989–1993).

== International career ==
At international level, Zalad was capped for the Yugoslavia national under-21 team during the 1978 UEFA European Under-21 Championship, winning the tournament.

== Post-playing career ==
After hanging up his boots, Zalad started working as a goalkeeping coach at Obilić. He later performed the same role for his parent club Partizan and the Serbia national team.

== Personal life ==
Zalad's parents are from Šipovo, Bosnia and Herzegovina and he holds Bosnian citizenship as well.

== Honours ==
Partizan

- Yugoslav First League: 1982–83

Beşiktaş

- Turkish Cup: 1988–89

Yugoslavia U21

- UEFA European Under-21 Championship: 1978
