= László Székely =

Hungarian footballer and manager

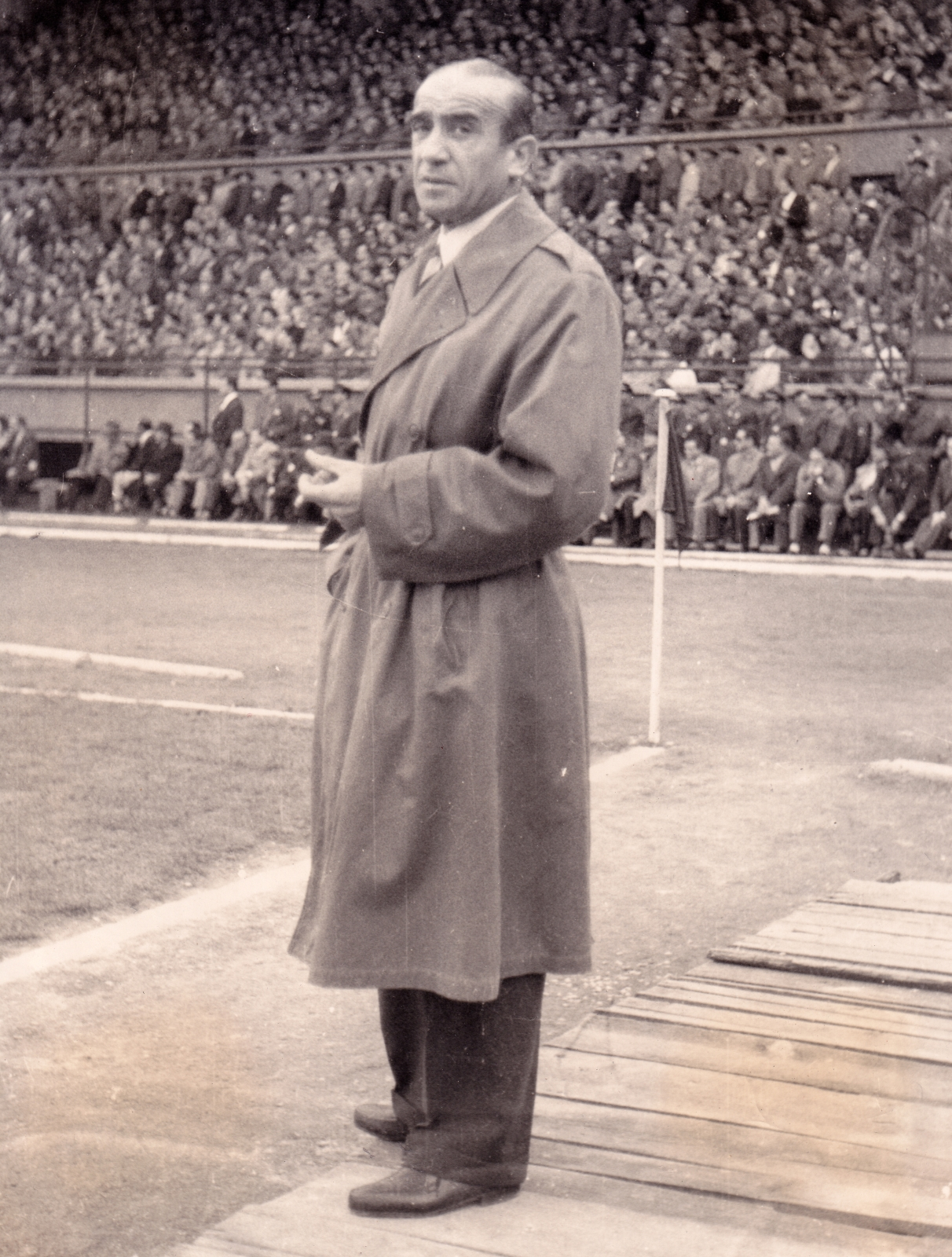

Personal information
- Full name: László Székely
- Date of birth: 1910
- Place of birth: Budapest, Hungary
- Date of death: 29 November 1969 (aged 58–59)
- Place of death: Robecco Pavese, Italy
- Position: Midfielder

Senior career*
Years	Team	Apps	(Gls)
1925–1929	CA Oradea	7	(1)
1945–1946	MTK		

Managerial career
- 1945–1946: Hakoah Vienna
- 1947–1948: Lecce
- 1948: Clube Atlético Juventus
- 1949: Fluminense
- 1949: Hungary U21
- 1949–1950: Hellas Verona
- 1950: Israel
- 1951–1953: Fenerbahçe
- 1953–1954: Galatasaray
- 1954–1955: Grêmio
- 1956–1957: Fenerbahçe
- 1957: Turkey
- 1957: Adalet
- 1958: Emniyet
- 1958: Vefa
- 1959: Beykozspor
- 1959–1960: Fatih Karagümrük
- 1960–1962: Fenerbahçe
- 1962–1963: Venezia
- 1963–1965: Palermo
- 1965–1967: Alessandria
- 1967–1968: Modena
- 1968–1969: Albenga
- * Club domestic league appearances and goals

László Székely (1910 – 29 November 1969) was a Hungarian footballer and football manager.

Székely is best known for winning the 1960–61 Turkish National League with Fenerbahçe.

== Managerial career ==
Székely had a brief playing career as a midfielder, before travelling around the world coaching teams in different countries. Székely was briefly the manager of both the Israeli and Turkish national football teams. A journeyman, Székely managed several teams in Italy, Brazil, Austria, and Turkey before dying in a car accident on 29 November 1969.

== Honours ==
=== Managerial ===
Fenerbahçe

- Turkish National League: 1960-1961
