= Şenol Fidan =

Turkish footballer and coach

Personal information
- Full name: Şenol Fidan
- Date of birth: 29 January 1966 (age 60)
- Place of birth: Istanbul, Turkey
- Height: 1.78 m (5 ft 10 in)
- Position: Midfielder

Senior career*
| Years | Team | Apps | (Gls) |
| 1986–1988 | Boluspor | 70 | (20) |
| 1988–1993 | Beşiktaş | 111 | (7) |
| 1993–1994 | Gaziantepspor | 29 | (1) |
| 1995–1997 | Dardanelspor | 59 | (10) |
| 1997 | Eskişehirspor | 14 | (0) |
| 1998 | Karşıyaka S.K. | 18 | (0) |
| 1998–2002 | Pendikspor | 64 | (9) |

Managerial career
- 2007–2008: Kahramanmaraşspor
- 2019–2020: Beşiktaş (assistant)
- 2020: Beşiktaş (interim)
- 2020–2021: BB Erzurumspor (assistant)
- 2021: Tuzlaspor
- * Club domestic league appearances and goals

Şenol Fidan (born 29 January 1967) is a former Turkish footballer and currently coach.

== Career ==
=== Player ===
Fidan had begun playing football in Boluspor. He joined Beşiktaş in 1988, in which he played for 5 seasons and won numerous trophies. He played as a playmaker in midfield. Later years he lost his placed to Mehmet Ozdilek and then transferred to Gaziantepspor in 1993.

=== Coaching ===
Started his managerial career with Kahramanmaraşspor in 2007. In 2011, he was appointed as coach assistant of Mehmet Özdilek at Antalyaspor. He later became the coach assistant of Mehmet Özdilek successively at Gençlerbirliği (2013-2014), Çaykur Rizespor (2014) and Kayseri Erciyesspor (2015).

== Honours ==
- Beşiktaş
  - Turkish League: 3 (1989–90, 1990–91, 1991–92)
  - Turkish Cup: 2 (1988–89, 1989–90)
  - Presidential Cup: 2 (988-89, 1991–92)
  - TSYD Cup: 3 (1988, 1990, 1991)
