= 1988–89 1.Lig =

31st season of top-tier Turkish football

1.Lig
- Season: 1988–89
- Champions: Fenerbahçe; 12th title
- Relegated: Eskişehirspor; Çaykur Rizespor; Kahramanmaraşspor
- European Cup: Fenerbahçe
- Cup Winners' Cup: Beşiktaş
- UEFA Cup: Galatasaray
- Matches: 324
- Goals: 931 (2.87 per match)
- Top goalscorer: Aykut Kocaman (29 goals)

Statistics of Turkish First Football League in season 1988/1989.

== Overview ==
It was contested by 19 teams, and Fenerbahçe S.K. won the championship.

On 20 January 1989, while traveling to Malatya to face Malatyaspor, Samsunspor were involved in a bus accident that killed three of their players and left seven others seriously injured. In addition, two coaches, manager Nuri Asan, and the team's bus driver were also killed in the accident.

Due to the tragedy, Samsunpor were left unable to field a team for their remaining 18 matches, which were scratched and awarded 3-0 to Samsunspor's opponents, while Samsunspor were reprieved from relegation at the end of the season.

== League table ==
Pos	Team	Pld	W	D	L	GF	GA	GD	Pts	Qualification or relegation
1	Fenerbahçe (C)	36	29	6	1	103	27	+76	93	Qualification to European Cup first round
2	Beşiktaş	36	25	8	3	81	21	+60	83	Qualification to Cup Winners' Cup first round
3	Galatasaray	36	20	9	7	76	31	+45	69	Qualification to UEFA Cup first round
4	Sarıyer	36	21	5	10	70	43	+27	68	
5	Trabzonspor	36	19	7	10	59	38	+21	64	
6	MKE Ankaragücü	36	17	9	10	53	41	+12	60	
7	Boluspor	36	15	7	14	48	43	+5	52	
8	Konyaspor	36	14	4	18	43	59	−16	46	
9	Bursaspor	36	12	8	16	42	53	−11	44	
10	Sakaryaspor	36	12	8	16	43	57	−14	44	
11	Karşıyaka	36	11	10	15	50	54	−4	43	
12	Malatyaspor	36	11	10	15	59	68	−9	43	
13	Adanaspor	36	11	9	16	53	56	−3	42	
14	Adana Demirspor	36	12	6	18	51	73	−22	42	
15	Altay	36	11	8	17	46	58	−12	41	
16	Eskişehirspor (R)	36	11	8	17	38	57	−19	41	Relegation to Turkish Second Football League
17	Çaykur Rizespor (R)	36	9	8	19	36	65	−29	35	Relegation to Turkish Second Football League
18	Kahramanmaraşspor A.Ş. (R)	36	4	11	21	22	71	−49	23	Relegation to Turkish Second Football League
19	Samsunspor	36	4	7	25	12	70	−58	19	

Rules for classification: 1) points; 2) goal difference; 3) number of goals scored.
(C) Champions; (R) Relegated

== Results ==
Home \ Away	ADS	ADA	ALT	BJK	BOL	BUR	ESK	FNB	GAL	KAH	KSK	KON	MAL	AGÜ	RİZ	SAK	SAM	SAR	TRA
Adana Demirspor		0–3	0–2	1–1	1–5	2–0	5–2	1–3	0–0	1–0	2–1	1–0	1–0	2–2	3–0	3–3	3–0	1–5	3–1
Adanaspor	2–2		2–1	0–1	2–0	5–0	4–0	1–3	0–0	2–0	2–1	1–1	1–3	1–0	3–1	3–3	3–0	1–4	2–2
Altay	4–0	1–0		1–3	1–1	2–4	1–2	0–3	0–4	0–1	2–1	4–2	3–0	0–1	3–1	0–0	3–0	3–3	2–1
Beşiktaş	2–0	4–1	3–0		0–0	3–2	3–0	2–0	0–1	7–0	2–0	4–0	4–0	3–1	4–0	4–1	3–0	1–0	2–0
Boluspor	0–2	2–1	2–0	1–1		2–0	4–0	0–2	0–0	1–0	2–3	0–1	1–0	1–0	2–1	5–2	2–0	0–1	2–0
Bursaspor	1–0	1–0	2–0	1–1	1–1		2–1	0–1	1–0	1–1	1–1	2–0	3–2	0–0	1–2	3–0	3–0	2–1	0–6
Eskişehirspor	3–2	2–1	1–1	0–1	0–0	2–1		2–7	1–1	3–0	0–0	0–2	2–1	1–2	1–0	2–2	2–0	0–1	0–0
Fenerbahçe	6–0	1–0	4–0	2–1	4–2	3–1	3–1		1–0	4–1	2–0	4–1	6–1	5–1	3–0	2–0	0–0	3–2	5–1
Galatasaray	4–1	7–3	2–1	1–4	4–0	2–1	1–0	1–1		6–0	4–1	3–1	6–0	5–2	2–0	1–1	4–0	1–2	2–0
Kahramanmaraşspor	1–3	2–2	1–0	0–3	0–1	1–2	0–0	0–0	1–1		1–1	0–0	2–1	0–2	0–0	0–0	1–1	0–1	1–2
Karşıyaka	2–3	1–0	1–2	1–1	2–2	2–2	3–0	1–2	0–0	2–2		1–0	1–0	2–2	4–1	2–1	3–0	2–1	4–3
Konyaspor	2–1	2–0	3–0	1–2	2–3	3–1	2–1	1–5	1–0	3–0	1–0		3–3	0–1	1–1	1–0	1–0	0–3	0–1
Malatyaspor	2–1	2–3	3–3	1–1	3–2	1–0	3–2	1–1	0–0	3–1	2–1	7–2		1–1	4–2	3–0	3–0	2–2	1–1
MKE Ankaragücü	2–2	0–0	3–1	1–2	1–0	1–0	1–2	1–1	0–1	7–0	3–2	2–0	2–1		2–1	0–0	1–0	2–1	2–0
Rizespor	2–1	2–2	0–2	1–1	2–0	2–1	0–0	0–5	1–3	2–0	1–1	2–0	2–2	2–0		2–0	0–0	1–3	0–2
Sakaryaspor	2–1	0–0	1–0	0–3	1–0	2–0	0–2	1–4	1–3	4–1	2–0	4–2	3–1	0–2	2–1		0–1	3–1	1–0
Samsunspor	3–0	3–0	1–1	0–0	0–3	1–0	0–3	0–3	0–3	0–3	1–2	0–3	1–1	0–3	0–3	0–3		0–1	0–0
Sarıyer	3–1	2–1	1–1	1–3	2–1	1–1	1–0	3–4	3–1	3–0	2–1	2–0	2–1	2–2	2–0	3–0	3–0		2–3
Trabzonspor	4–1	2–1	1–1	2–1	3–0	1–1	2–0	0–0	3–2	2–1	2–0	0–1	2–0	2–0	5–0	1–0	3–0	1–0	

Source: TFF, Mackolik
Legend: Blue = home team win; Yellow = draw; Red = away team win.
