= Ersun Yanal =

Turkish football manager

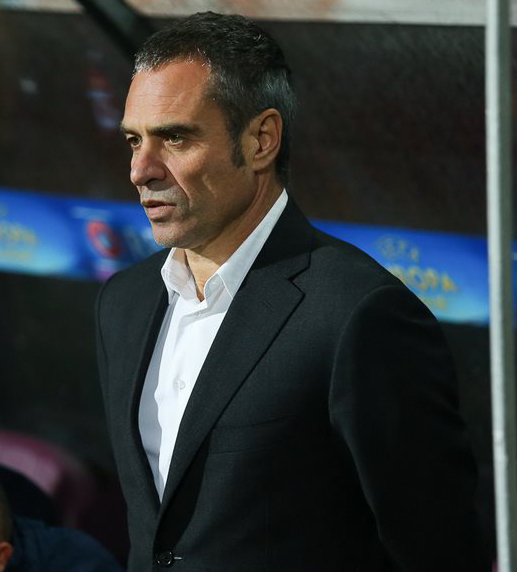

Personal information
- Full name: Kazım Ersun Yanal
- Date of birth: 17 December 1961 (age 64)
- Place of birth: İzmir, Turkey
- Height: 1.75 m (5 ft 9 in)

Senior career*
Years	Team	Apps	(Gls)
- Denizlispor
1982–1984	Manisaspor		
1984–1985	Denizli Emsan Şirinköy İDY		
1985–1987	Nazilli Belediyespor		
1987–1988	Sarayköyspor		

Managerial career
- 1996: Denizlispor
- 1997–1998: Yeni Salihlispor
- 1998–1999: Denizlispor
- 2000–2002: Ankaragücü
- 2002–2004: Gençlerbirliği
- 2004–2005: Turkey
- 2005–2007: Manisaspor
- 2007–2009: Trabzonspor
- 2012–2013: Eskişehirspor
- 2013–2014: Fenerbahçe
- 2014–2015: Trabzonspor
- 2016–2017: Trabzonspor
- 2018–2020: Fenerbahçe
- 2020–2021: Antalyaspor
- 2023: Alanyaspor
- 2024: Amedspor
- * Club domestic league appearances and goals

Kazım Ersun Yanal (Turkish pronunciation: [eɾˈsun ˈjanaɫ], born 17 December 1961) is a Turkish football manager and former player. His style has always been attacking football doubled up with tactics unprecedented in Turkish football. He enjoys a very respectable place amongst Turkish coaches although having only won a single title.

== Managerial career ==
=== 1990–2013 ===
Yanal started his coaching career in 1990 at Sarayköyspor, a team located in the Sarayköy district of Denizli, where his family resided for many years.

Ersun Yanal's career Süper Lig career started with Denizlispor in the 1995-1996 season. After Ümit Kayıhan's resignation, Yanal took charge of Denizlispor in the last 6 weeks of the league, experiencing 1 win, 2 draws and 3 defeats in 6 games. Following his management of Denizlispor, he was appointed manager of TFF Second League club Yeni Salihlispor in 1997, winning the Afyonkarahisar Çay Municipality District Governorship Cup in the 1997-1998 season with the club.

He was appointed as manager of Süper Lig side Ankaragücü on 17 July 2000. Under Yanal's managership, Ankaragücü saw two successive seasons, becoming 6th in the 2000–01 season and 4th in the 2001–02 season with even some victories against The Big Three. Yanal was appointed head of Gençlerbirliği on 19 June 2002. He reached the 4th round of the UEFA Cup with the club and was knocked out by eventual champions Valencia 2–1 on aggregate in extra-time in the second leg. He also lost the final of the Turkish Cup twice to Trabzonspor in 2003 and 2004. In April 2004 he was appointed as head coach of the Turkish national team. Yanal's tactics showed their fruit immediately as Turkey won two friendlies against Australia, beating them 3–1 and 1–0. Yanal's successful run was ended by South Korea after a 2–1 defeat. His job was to secure qualification for the 2006 World Cup but despite being on target to achieving this goal, sitting in second place in the qualifying group, he was dismissed in June 2005 to be replaced by Fatih Terim, who couldn't lead the team to the finals in Germany. Yanal was named new manager of Manisaspor for the 2005–06 season. At the end of the winter break in the 2006–07 season, the club were flying high in fourth position. However, they could not keep up the results, finishing in 12th place, four points away from relegation. Yanal parted company with Manisaspor after their match at home to bottom-side Sakaryaspor was abandoned following on field violence. In October 2007 he was signed by Trabzonspor to take over from Ziya Doğan, signing a three-year deal at the club. In April 2009 he resigned his job from Trabzonspor. He was appointed the general director of the Turkish Football Federation on 22 February 2010. On 4 October 2011 he was sacked from his job in accordance to TFF's decision to affiliate all age categories of the Turkish national football team to the A national football team coach.

=== 2013–present ===
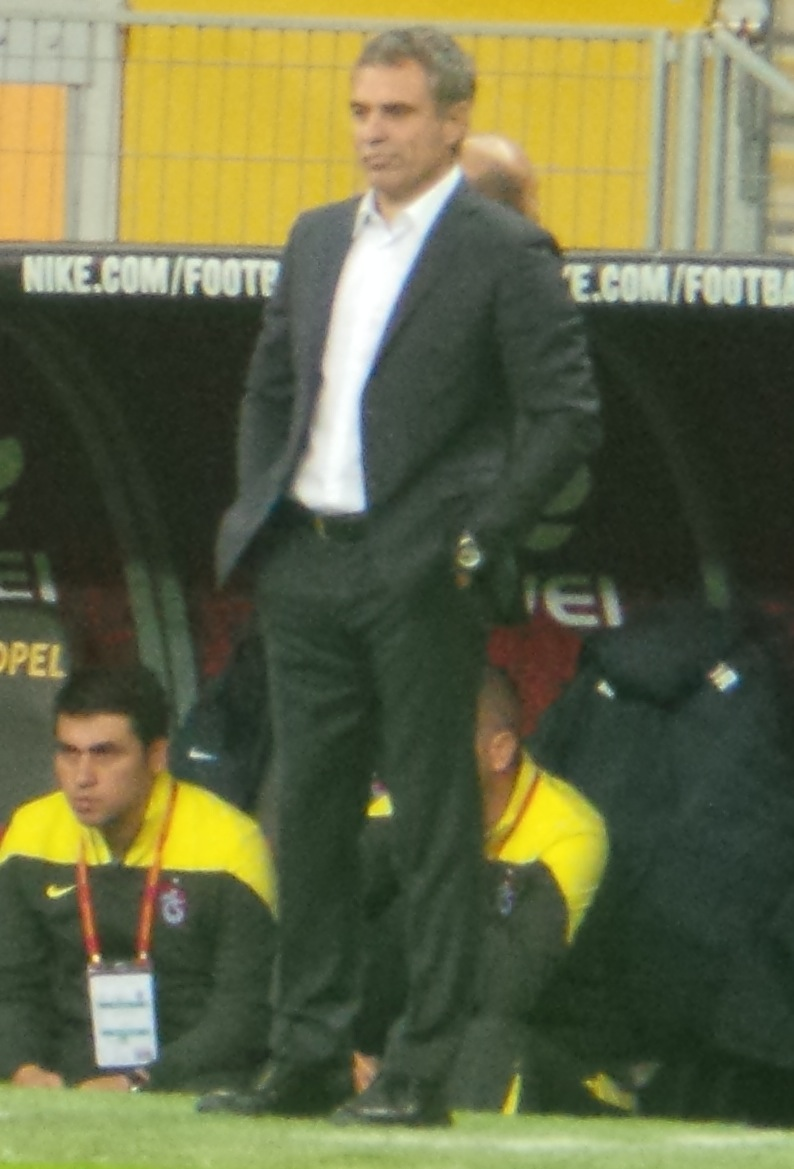
Yanal with Trabzonspor in 2014

On 28 June 2013, Yanal agreed to take charge of Fenerbahçe, replacing Aykut Kocaman who resigned in May 2013. His appointment coincided with tough times for Fenerbahçe who had been banned from European competition for two seasons over their alleged involvement in a domestic match-fixing scandal. On 1 July 2013, Fenerbahçe opened the 2013-14 season with a training session. Yanal, addressing his players, said the absolute goal was winning the Süper Lig championship. “I have gotten to know you. You will get to know me and we will get to know each other much better. Let's keep our eyes on the prize and hope for the best next season,” he noted. On 18 July 2013, Fenerbahçe played in the Champions League third qualifying round despite its UEFA ban after winning an emergency ruling from the Court of Arbitration for Sport. On 31 July 2013, on Yanal's first official match, Fenerbahçe made the most of their Champions League lifeline with a 1–1 draw against Red Bull Salzburg in the first leg of their third qualifying round tie. On 6 August, Fenerbahçe defeated Salzburg 3–1 in the second leg, which was Yanal's first competitive win for the club. On 11 August 2013, Yanal coached in his first Intercontinental Derby, the 40th edition of the Turkish Super Cup played in Kayseri. This was the 375th meeting between the rivals. Galatasaray won the match with a header from Didier Drogba in the first half of extra time, which was also the only goal in the match.

On 17 August 2013, Yanal coached his first league match with Fenerbahçe, squandering a 2–0 first-half lead to lose 3–2 to newcomer Torku Konyaspor in their Süper Lig opener at Konya Atatürk Stadium. Four days later, Fenerbahçe lost 3–0 to Arsenal at Şükrü Saracoğlu Stadium in the first leg of the Champions League play-off round. They lost in the second leg as well, losing 5-0 on aggregate. On 10 November 2013, Yanal won his first Intercontinental Derby, with a score of 2–0 against Galatasaray, maintaining a nearly 15-year streak of suffering no derby losses on home turf. On 1 December, Yanal coached his first Beşiktaş-Fenerbahçe rivalry, drawing 3–3 with the black and whites in an eventful Süper Lig match that witnessed a number of controversial positions. On 4 December, Fenerbahçe suffered an unexpected 2–1 loss in the 2013–14 Turkish Cup at home against first division side Fethiyespor. Yanal's Fenerbahçe won the Süper Lig title with three games to spare after a 0–0 draw at home to Çaykur Rizespor, in front of a crowd made up exclusively of women and children. On 21 May 2014, Yanal stated that he would extend his contract with Fenerbahçe by two more years. Yanal would have earned $1,75 million each year in accordance with the contract. However, on 9 August, he resigned due to disagreements with the club's board.

After the 15th week of the 2018-19 Süper Lig season, he returned to Fenerbahçe as manager.

Yanal, who started the 2019-20 season well with Fenerbahçe, resigned on 1 March 2020 after the point losses in the second half of the season were added to the defeat to arch-rival Galatasaray in Kadıköy after 20 years. It was announced by the club that they parted ways but Ersun Yanal that he would be in charge of the team against Trabzonspor in the Ziraat Turkish Cup match to be played on 4 March 2020. After the match, Yanal's 2nd Fenerbahçe period officially ended.

== Managerial statistics ==
As of match played 18 April 2023

Managerial record by team and tenure
Team	Nat	From	To	Record				
Team	Nat	From	To	G	W	D	L	Win %
Denizlispor	(Turkey)	5 September 1996	14 November 1996	10	2	3	5	20.00
Yeni Salihlispor	(Turkey)	11 September 1997	31 May 1998	32	12	7	13	37.50
Denizlispor	(Turkey)	1 August 1998	31 May 1999	38	24	6	8	63.16
Ankaragücü	(Turkey)	17 July 2000	19 June 2002	73	34	16	23	46.58
Gençlerbirliği	(Turkey)	19 June 2002	15 May 2004	86	44	19	23	51.16
Turkey	(Turkey)	28 April 2004	8 June 2005	15	8	4	3	53.33
Manisaspor	(Turkey)	13 October 2005	19 March 2007	58	21	11	26	36.21
Trabzonspor	(Turkey)	27 October 2007	28 April 2009	62	30	12	20	48.39
Eskişehirspor	(Turkey)	2 January 2012	31 May 2013	75	29	24	22	38.67
Fenerbahçe	(Turkey)	28 June 2013	9 August 2014	40	24	6	10	60.00
Trabzonspor	(Turkey)	12 November 2014	2 July 2015	36	17	9	10	47.22
Trabzonspor	(Turkey)	1 June 2016	16 October 2017	50	20	15	15	40.00
Fenerbahçe	(Turkey)	14 December 2018	3 March 2020	56	27	15	14	48.21
Antalyaspor	(Turkey)	11 November 2020	4 October 2021	46	14	16	16	30.43
Alanyaspor	(Turkey)	27 February 2023	19 April 2023	7	2	1	4	28.57
Total				683	307	164	212	44.95

== Honours ==
=== Managerial honours ===
Fenerbahçe

- Süper Lig (1): 2013–14

=== Individual honours ===
- Turkish Manager of the Year: 2014

== Management style ==
Yanal is known for playing a self-destructive tactic of going all out on attack and leaving huge holes in the midfield and defense. Teams coached by Yanal are recognised for conceding almost as many goals as they scored.

== Personal life ==
Yanal was born in İzmir, Turkey. He graduated from Manisa Celal Bayar University in 1984. Yanal has two kids and is married to İrem Ağan, the daughter of former CHP Bodrum Mayor Mazlum Ağan. He is of Kosovo Albanian origin.

== See also ==
- List of Fenerbahçe S.K. managers
