= Ignác Molnár =

Hungarian footballer and manager

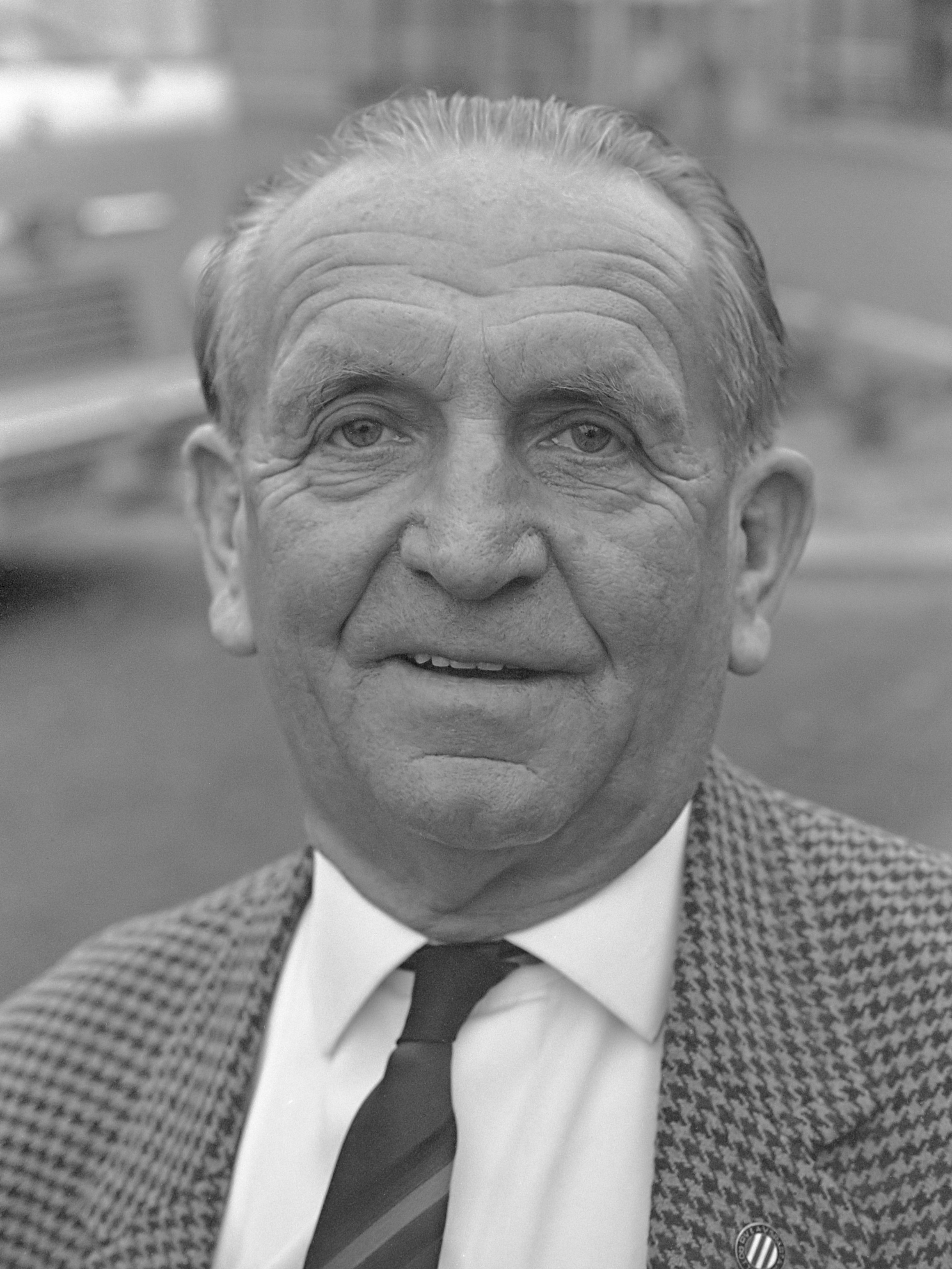

Personal information
- Full name: Ignác Molnár
- Date of birth: 1 October 1901
- Place of birth: Budapest, Austria-Hungary
- Date of death: 9 March 1986 (aged 84)
- Place of death: Vienna, Austria
- Position: Forward

Senior career*
Years	Team	Apps	(Gls)
1924	Bocskai		
1924–1925	Vincenza	8	(3)
1925–1927	Roman	5	(5)

Managerial career
- 1931–1932: Willem II
- 1932–1934: XerxesDZB
- 1933: Quick den Haag
- 1934–1936: Antwerp
- 1936–1939: XerxesDZB
- 1937: RFC Rotterdam
- 1939: Torino
- 1947–1948: Fenerbahçe
- 1948: Turkey
- 1957–1959: Fenerbahçe
- 1959: Turkey B
- 1959–1960: Turkey
- 1960–1961: Hapoel Petah Tikva
- 1961–1962: Maccabi Tel Aviv
- 1962–1963: Salzburg
- 1965–1966: Vefa
- 1966: Altınordu
- 1967–1969: Fenerbahçe
- 1969–1970: Adanaspor
- * Club domestic league appearances and goals

Ignác Molnár (1 October 1901 – 9 March 1986), also spelled Ignáce Molnár, was a Hungarian footballer and football manager.

A journeyman manager, Molnár managed teams in the Netherlands, Belgium, Italy, Turkey, Israel and Austria. Molnár is best known for his three stints with Fenerbahçe, especially the 1967–1968 season wherein he helped the team win 5 trophies.

== Managerial career ==
Molnár had a brief career as a footballer, playing in Hungary and Italy.

Molnár begun his managerial career with various teams in the Netherlands. He was so well liked by his players at Royal Antwerp F.C., that 7 members of the team left when Molnár was fired. Molnár moved to Torino in Italy to replace the Jewish-Hungarian Ernest Erbstein who has facing racial discrimination – his tenure ended at the start of World War II.

After the World War, Molnár managed Fenerbahçe and won the 1947–48 Istanbul Football League. Molnár then had two spells coaching the Turkey national football team and coached them during 1948 Summer Olympics. Molnár returned to Fenerbahçe again almost 10 years later, winning the inaugural Turkish National League in 1959. Molnár moved to Israel in 1960 with Hapoel Petah Tikva F.C. in the Liga Leumit (then the premier Israeli division), and won his debut season with one of the most dominant teams in Israeli history. Molnár returned to Fenerbahçe, and in his first season back won almost every competition the team participated in; the Turkish National League, Turkish Cup, Spor Toto Cup, and Balkans Cup were amongst the trophies won.

== Honours ==
=== Managerial ===
Fenerbahçe

- Istanbul Football League: 1947–1948
- Turkish National League: 1958–1959, 1967–1968
- Turkish Cup: 1967–1968
- Turkish Super Cup: 1967–1968
- Spor Toto Cup: 1967
- Balkans Cup: 1966–1967

Hapoel Petah Tikva

- Liga Leumit: 1960–1961
