= József Schweng =

Hungarian association football manager

Personal information
- Full name: József Ede Schweng
- Date of birth: 10 April 1899
- Place of birth: Miskolc, Hungary
- Position: Forward

Senior career*
Years	Team	Apps	(Gls)
–1922	Miskolci VSC		
1922–1923	MTK		
1923–1926	III. Kerületi TVE		

Managerial career
- 1926–1927: Iraklis
- 1928–1931: AEK Athens
- 1930: Greece
- 1931–1932: Karşıyaka
- 1932–1935: Fenerbahçe
- 1936: Turkey Olympic
- 1936–1937: Ankaragücü
- 1938–1940: Fenerbahçe
- 1946–1947: Galatasaray
- * Club domestic league appearances and goals

József Schweng (10 April 1899 – ?) was a Hungarian footballer who played as a forward and later a manager. He worked as a manager in Greece and Turkey, notably managing AEK Athens and Fenerbahçe. He was also known as József Sütő.

== Club career ==
Schweng began his playing career playing as a forward for with Miskolci VSC until 1922. He subsequently played for MTK until 1923 and afterwards he moved to III. Kerületi TVE. During his spell at the club Schweng appeared in the Hungarian first division, playing in a 1–1 draw against Zuglói VII. Ker. AC on 7 September 1924 and in a 3–2 victory over 33 FC on 27 September 1925. He finished his career as a footballer in 1926.

== Managerial career ==
=== Greece ===
AEK Athens' squad in 1929 under Schweng

In 1926, Schweng moved to Greece, where he worked as a manager at Iraklis. He led the club to the Macedonia FCA championship in 1927.

In early 1928, he took charge of AEK Athens, becoming their first ever manager. He stayed at the club until 1931, with AEK finishing second in the Athens FCA championship in each season under his management. On 2 March 1930, Schweng also served as the manager of Greece in a friendly 3–0 away defeat to Italy.

=== Turkey ===
In 1931, after his time in Greece, Schweng moved to Turkey and signed for Karşıyaka, where he stayed for a season. He then moved to Fenerbahçe in 1932, becoming the club's first foreign manager. In his first season, Fenerbahçe won the Istanbul Football League undefeated, recording 10 wins and 2 draws in 12 matches. Schweng also led the club to victory in the Turkish Football Championship in 1933. He was described as a particularly hard-working manager who was highly dedicated to the club and its players. Schweng had completed the Hungarian coaching course in 1933, graduating first in his class and had been appointed as an instructor at the school. Having emphasized the importance of formal coaching education, he also had knowledge of tactics, technique, anatomy, sports medicine, massage, refereeing, pitch management, physical conditioning and athletics, as well as an understanding of FIFA and the wider organisation of football. In the following season Fenerbahçe finished second in the Istanbul Football League.

According to Magyar Futball, Schweng coached the Turkey Olympic team in 1936. He also managed Ankaragücü from 1936 to 1937. In 1938 Schweng returned to Fenerbahçe for a second spell until 1940. He later managed Galatasaray during the 1946–47 season.

== Managerial statistics ==
Managerial record by team and tenure
Team	From	To	Record					Ref.
Team	From	To	P	W	D	L	Win %	Ref.
Iraklis	1926	1927	6	5	1	0	83.3	
AEK Athens	1928	1931	38	22	7	9	57.9	
Greece	2 March 1930	2 March 1930	1	0	0	1	0.0	
Fenerbahçe	5 June 1932	18 May 1934	44	35	6	3	79.5	
Ankaragücü	1936	1937	14	5	2	7	35.7	
Fenerbahçe	9 July 1938	17 November 1939	32	20	5	7	62.5	
Galatasaray	1946	1947	31	13	11	7	41.9	
Total			166	100	32	34	60.2	

== Honours ==
Iraklis

- Macedonia FCA Championship: 1926–27

Fenerbahçe

- Istanbul Football League: 1932–33, 1934–35
- Turkish Football Championship: 1933, 1935
