= Tamer Güney =

Turkish footballer and manager (1936–2020)

Personal information
- Date of birth: 6 January 1936
- Place of birth: Bilecik, Turkey
- Date of death: 22 August 2020 (age 84)
- Place of death: Istanbul, Turkey
- Position: Midfielder

Senior career*
Years	Team	Apps	(Gls)
1965–1969	Ankaragücü		

Managerial career
- 1969–1970: Türk Telekom
- 1971: Balıkesirspor
- 1971–1972: Orduspor
- 1974: Şekerspor
- 1974–1975: Kayseri Erciyesspor
- 1975–1976: Adanaspor
- 1976–1977: Eskişehirspor
- 1977–1978: Ankaragücü
- 1978–1979: Adanaspor
- 1979: Diyarbakırspor
- 1979–1980: Kayserispor
- 1981–1982: Adanaspor
- 1983–1985: Gaziantepspor
- 1986: Ayvalıkgücü Belediyespor
- 1986–1987: Osmaniyespor
- 1987–1988: Ayvalıkgücü Belediyespor
- 1995–1996: Gaziantepspor (youth)
- 2000–2003: Fenerbahçe (youth)
- 2003: Fenerbahçe (interim)
- * Club domestic league appearances and goals

Tamer Güney (6 January 1936 – 22 August 2020) was a Turkish football player and manager who played as a midfielder.
