= Necdet Niş =

Turkish footballer (1937–2018)

Personal information
- Full name: Necdet Kaya Niş
- Date of birth: 6 April 1937
- Place of birth: Ankara, Turkey
- Date of death: 11 April 2018 (aged 81)
- Height: 1.82 m (6 ft 0 in)
- Position: Midfielder

Senior career*
Years	Team	Apps	(Gls)
1959–1967	ASAS Spor		

Managerial career
- 1967–1968: Kırıkkalespor
- 1969–1970: ASAS Spor
- 1973–1974: Göztepe
- 1975–1976: Fenerbahçe
- 1976–1978: Altay
- 1978–1979: Fenerbahçe
- 1979–1980: Bursaspor
- 1980–1982: Sakaryaspor
- 1983–1984: Sakaryaspor
- 1987–1988: Sakaryaspor
- 1988–1989: Bakırköyspor
- 1989–1990: Ankaragücü
- 1993–1996: Fenerbahçe (youth)
- 1996: Sakaryaspor
- 1998–2000: Fenerbahçe
- * Club domestic league appearances and goals

Necdet Niş (6 April 1937 – 11 April 2018) was a Turkish football player and manager.
