= Kahramanmaraşspor =

Turkish football club

- Full name: Kahramanmaraşspor A.Ş.
- Nickname: Akdeniz Aslanları
- Founded: 21 February 1969; 57 years ago
- Ground: Batıpark Adem Şahan Synthetic Turf Field; Kahramanmaraş, Turkey
- Chairman: Fatih Mehmet Ceyhan
- Manager: Sinan Yücer
- Website: http://www.kahramanmarasspor.org/
Home colours	Away colours

Kahramanmaraşspor is a Turkish professional football club based in Kahramanmaraş.

== History ==
Following the 2023 Turkey–Syria earthquake, the club withdrew from the 2022-23 TFF Third League.

== League participations ==
- Süper Lig: 1988–89
- TFF First League: 1984–88, 1989–93, 1994–96, 2013–14
- TFF Second League: 1993–94, 1996–2008, 2009–10, 2012–13, 2014–2022
- TFF Third League: 2008–09, 2010–12, 2022-
- Amateur Leagues: 1969–84

== Current squad ==
As of 9 March 2020

Note: Flags indicate national team as defined under FIFA eligibility rules; some limited exceptions apply. Players may hold more than one non-FIFA nationality.

No.	Pos.	Nation	Player
1	GK	TUR	Özkan Karabulut
3	MF	TUR	Cihan Avcu
4	DF	TUR	Melih Mursal
9	FW	TUR	Haluk Türkeri
10	MF	NED	Fatih Kamaçi
12	GK	TUR	Ahmet Gül
13	DF	TUR	Caner Bulut
16	FW	TUR	Hakkı Şimşek
19	MF	TUR	Ebubekir Berke Tambay
24	DF	TUR	Kadir Kaan Özdemir (on loan from Konyaspor)

No.	Pos.	Nation	Player
30	DF	TUR	Alperen Erdoğan
32	GK	TUR	Selçuk Özcan
33	FW	TUR	Eren Nergiz
35	DF	TUR	Bayram Çetin
44	DF	TUR	Safa Ali Memnun
60	MF	TUR	Recep Türköz
71	DF	TUR	Orhan Evci
99	DF	TUR	Selahattin Öztürk
—	MF	TUR	Hüseyin Yılmaz

== Former players ==
- (Germany) (Turkey) Taylan Aydoğan

== Former managers ==
- Bayram Toysal
- Orhan Şerit
- Alaaddin Demirözü
- Hüseyin Yenikan
- Fuat Akyüz
- Rahim Zafer
- Faik Demir
- Recep Aydemir
- Mehmet Şahan
- Turhan Sofuoğlu (also former manager of Fenerbahce SK)
- Gheorghe 'Gigi' Multescu
- Abdülkerim Durmaz
- Erdal Alpaslan
