= İsmail Kartal =

Turkish footballer and manager

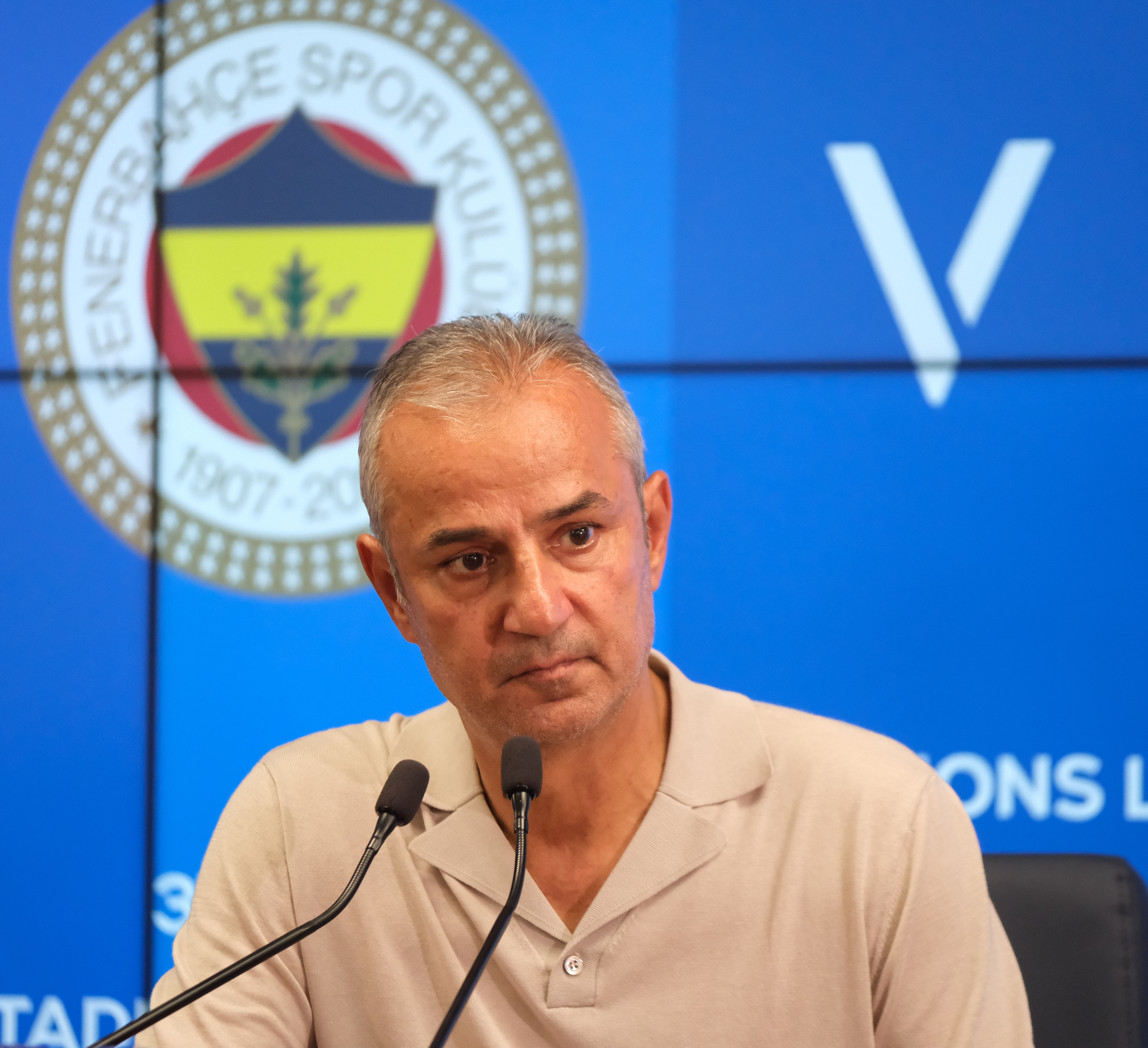
- Kartal with Fenerbahçe in 2026

Personal information
- Date of birth: 15 June 1961 (age 65)
- Place of birth: Istanbul, Turkey
- Height: 1.76 m (5 ft 9 in)
- Position: Right back

Senior career*
Years	Team	Apps	(Gls)
1980–1981	Sarıyer	0	(0)
1981–1983	Gaziantepspor	59	(2)
1983–1993	Fenerbahçe	236	(15)
1993–1994	Denizlispor	32	(12)
1994–1995	Adanaspor	7	(1)
Total		334	(30)

International career
1982–1984	Turkey U21	2	(1)
1982–1985	Turkey	6	(0)

Managerial career
- 2000–2001: Karabükspor
- 2004–2005: Sivasspor
- 2005–2006: Mardinspor
- 2006: Altay
- 2006: Mardinspor
- 2006–2007: Malatyaspor
- 2008: Orduspor
- 2008–2009: Konya Şeker
- 2010–2014: Fenerbahçe (assistant)
- 2014–2015: Fenerbahçe
- 2015: Eskişehirspor
- 2016: Gaziantepspor
- 2017–2018: Ankaragücü
- 2019–2020: Çaykur Rizespor
- 2020–2021: Konyaspor
- 2022: Fenerbahçe
- 2023–2024: Fenerbahçe
- 2025: Persepolis
- 2026: Fenerbahçe
- * Club domestic league appearances and goals

İsmail Kartal (born 15 June 1961), colloquially known by the given nickname "Arap İsmail" due to his skin color, is a Turkish professional football manager and former player who was most recently the manager of Süper Lig club Fenerbahçe.

== Playing career ==
Born in Istanbul, Turkey, Kartal began his football career at Sarıyer. He later transferred to Gaziantepspor. After two years at the club, he transferred to Fenerbahce and played there from 1983 to 1993, playing 235 matches and scoring 15 goals, nine of which came from penalties. He won two national league titles with Fenerbahce in 1984–85 and 1988–89 seasons.

He enjoyed the most productive period of his playing career with Denizlispor in the 1993–1994 season, scoring 12 goals in 32 matches. After playing for Adanaspor in the 1994–1995 season, he retired from active football. Kartal played twelve seasons from 1981 to 1993 in the Turkish Süper Lig.

== International career ==
Kartal two appearances for the senior Turkey U21 national football team from 1982 through 1984 and made six appearances for the senior Turkey national football team from 1982 through 1985.

== Managerial career ==
After his retirement as a professional football player, worked in the Fenerbahçe Academy between 1997 and 1999. He made his first professional managerial debut at Karabükspor in the TFF First League. He then took over at Sivasspor, leading the Yiğidolar to the TFF First League championship at the end of the season and into the Süper Lig for the first time in their history. He also managed Mardinspor, Altay, Malatyaspor, Orduspor and Konya Anadolu Selçukspor.

He led Ankaragücü to became second of TFF First League and promoted to the Süper Lig in 2018.

=== Fenerbahçe ===
Between 2010 and 2014, he was the assistant coach at Fenerbahce.

==== First era (2014–15 season) ====
After Ersun Yanal's resignation, Kartal took over as manager.

At the end of the 2014–15 Süper Lig season, he officially announced his resignation as manager of Fenerbahçe, though it was clear beforehand that he would not be manager for the next season.

==== Second era (2021–22 season) ====
On 12 January 2022, following the departure of Vitor Pereira, Kartal signed with Fenerbahçe for the rest of the season. At the end of the season, Fenerbahçe finished in second place, by eight points behind Trabzonspor. Kartal finished with a record of twelve wins, five draws and four losses in 21 matches.

==== Third era (2023–24 season) ====
On 28 June 2023, Kartal signed a one-year contract with Fenerbahçe for his third managerial spell at the club. In the 2023–24 season, he led the club to achieve 99 points in the Süper Lig, yet they finished second behind their rivals Galatasaray with 102 points. Upon the conclusion of the season, he left the club on 31 May 2024.

=== Persepolis ===
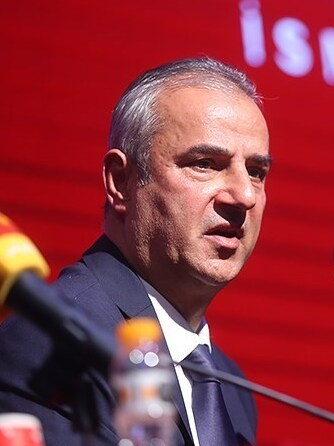
Kartal with Persepolis in 2025

On 24 January 2025, Persepolis signed Kartal to a 18-month contract for the rest of the 2024–25 season.

In June 2025, following the outbreak of the Twelve-Day War, İsmail Kartal terminated his contract with Persepolis and left the club by mutual agreement.

=== Fourth term with Fenerbahçe ===
On 18 June 2026, Kartal signed a one-year contract with Fenerbahçe for his fourth managerial spell at the club, after two years.

For the first time after 18 years since the 2008-2009 season, on 26 August 2026, Kartal took Fenerbahçe to the Champions League league phase after passing 3 UEFA elimination rounds against Górnik Zabrze, SK Sturm Graz, and Olympique Lyonnais, beating them on aggregate 1-2, 0-3, and 2-3 respectively.

On 10 September 2026, Kartal announced his immediate resignation from the club following a 1–1 draw against Roma in the Champions League league phase due to negative press and fans throwing water bottles at him. However, club president Aziz Yıldırım stated that Kartal would remain in charge. Although Kartal stated in the post-game press conference that he would not return, Fenerbahçe officials convinced him to stay on as manager and made an official announcement that he was still the manager.

Following the 2-1 defeat in the derby against Galatasaray on October 26, and the subsequent protests from fans, Fenerbahçe President Aziz Yıldırım and board member Cihan Kamer visited the Samandıra Facilities on October 27, to hold a meeting with the manager. After this discussion, Kartal submitted his resignation to the Fenerbahçe board, stating, "I have made this decision to clear the way for my club. I will never return." Following a brief deliberation, the board accepted Kartal's resignation and expressed their gratitude to him.

== Honours ==
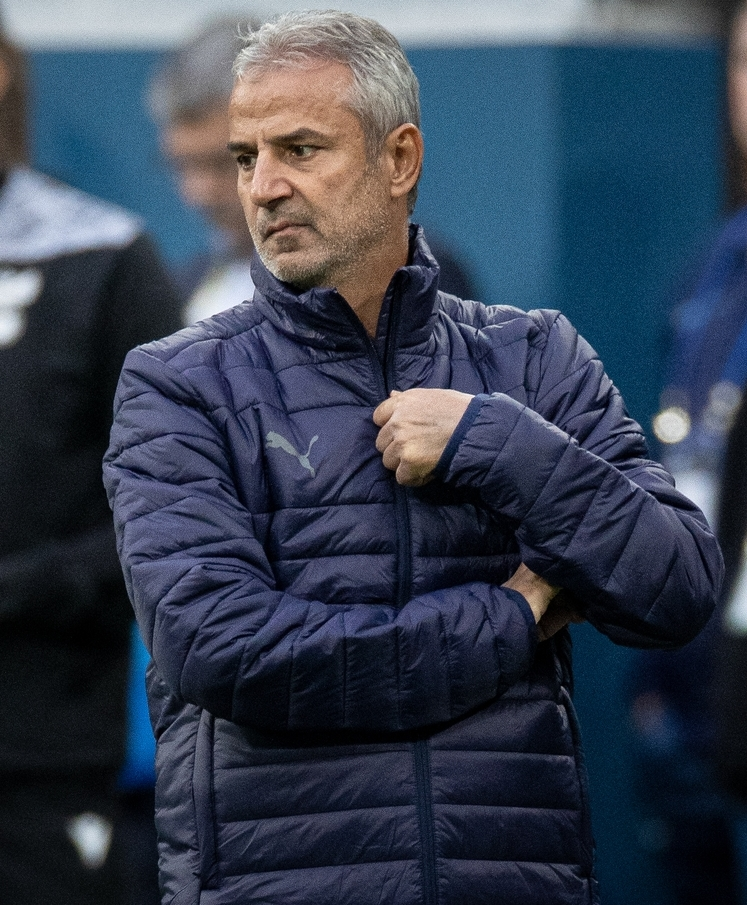
Kartal coaching Fenerbahçe for the 2023–24 season

=== Player ===
Sarıyer

- TFF First League: 1981–82

Fenerbahçe

- Süper Lig: 1984–85, 1988–89
- Turkish Super Cup: 1984, 1985, 1990
- Prime Minister's Cup: 1989

=== Assistant Manager ===
Fenerbahçe

- Süper Lig: 2010–11, 2013–14
- Turkish Cup: 2011–12, 2012–13

=== Manager ===
Sivasspor

- TFF First League: 2004–05

Fenerbahçe

- Turkish Super Cup: 2014

== Managerial statistics ==
As of 26 October 2026

Team	Nat	League	From	To	Record					PPM
Team	Nat	League	From	To	G	W	D	L	Win %	PPM
Karabükspor	(Turkey)	TFF First League	16 November 2000	31 January 2001	4	2	0	2	50.00	1.50
Sivasspor	(Turkey)	TFF First League	25 August 2004	30 June 2005	35	23	5	7	65.71	2.11
Mardinspor	(Turkey)	TFF First League	19 October 2005	24 January 2006	9	3	3	3	33.33	1.33
Altay	(Turkey)	TFF First League	24 January 2006	27 March 2006	11	5	3	3	45.45	1.80
Mardinspor	(Turkey)	TFF First League	4 August 2006	26 October 2006	12	4	4	4	33.33	1.36
Malatyaspor	(Turkey)	TFF First League	9 November 2006	21 May 2007	22	12	4	6	54.55	1.82
Orduspor	(Turkey)	TFF First League	17 January 2008	30 June 2008	16	5	9	2	31.25	1.50
Konya Şeker	(Turkey)	TFF First League	31 October 2008	23 October 2009	40	18	14	8	45.00	1.70
Fenerbahçe	(Turkey)	Süper Lig	12 August 2014	30 May 2015	46	29	11	6	63.04	2.17
Eskişehirspor	(Turkey)	Süper Lig	14 October 2015	13 November 2015	4	0	0	4	0.00	0.00
Gaziantepspor	(Turkey)	Süper Lig	21 July 2016	7 December 2016	16	5	2	9	31.25	1.06
Ankaragücü	(Turkey)	TFF First League	21 June 2017	17 December 2018	34	18	9	7	52.94	1.62
Ankaragücü	(Turkey)	Süper Lig	21 June 2017	17 December 2018	19	7	2	10	36.84	1.62
Çaykur Rizespor	(Turkey)	Süper Lig	3 June 2019	3 March 2020	28	9	5	14	32.14	1.14
Konyaspor	(Turkey)	Süper Lig	15 September 2020	8 February 2021	24	9	6	9	37.50	1.38
Fenerbahçe	(Turkey)	Süper Lig	12 January 2022	2 June 2022	21	12	5	4	57.14	1.95
Fenerbahçe	(Turkey)	Süper Lig	28 June 2023	31 May 2024	58	45	6	7	77.59	2.40
Persepolis	(Iran)	Persian Gulf Pro League	24 January 2025	4 July 2025	16	8	4	4	50.00	1.75
Fenerbahçe	(Turkey)	Süper Lig	21 July 2026	27 October 2026	18	9	5	4	50.00	1.78
Total					433	223	97	113	51.50	1.77
