= Ulvi Güveneroğlu =

Turkish footballer, columnist, and manager

Personal information
- Date of birth: 26 July 1960 (age 66)
- Place of birth: Keban, Elazığ
- Position: Defender

Team information
- Current team: BJK (Chief Scout)

Youth career
- Elazığspor

Senior career*
Years	Team	Apps	(Gls)
1979–1994	Beşiktaş	422	(10)

International career^{‡}
1981	Turkey U-21	2	(0)
- * Club domestic league appearances and goals as of 4 September 2011 ‡ National team caps and goals as of 4 September 2011

Ulvi Güveneroğlu (born 26 July 1960) is a Turkish former footballer, columnist and manager. He currently works at Beşiktaş, his former club, as Chief Scout.

== Career ==
=== Club ===
He started playing football in Elazığspor and joined Beşiktaş in 1979 and served his club throughout his career. Played 422 times in domestic league (411 times in starting line up), he also played in European Cups, played 11 matches in Champions League and 6 times in UEFA Cup.

=== Managerial ===
He worked in several clubs since the early 2000s at clubs such as Gençlerbirliği, Gaziantepspor, İstanbulspor, Trabzonspor, Elazığspor, and Erzurumspor. In March 2010, he signed for Beşiktaş, quitting his position in Erzurumspor.

== Honours ==
- Beşiktaş
  - Turkish League: 5
  - Presidential Cup: 4
  - Chancellor Cup: 1
  - TSYD Cup: 6

=== Individual ===
- Beşiktaş J.K. Squads of Century (Bronze Team)
