= Kadir Akbulut =

Turkish footballer and coach

Personal information
- Full name: Kadir Akbulut
- Date of birth: 8 May 1968 (age 58)
- Place of birth: Çivril, Denizli, Turkey
- Height: 1.80 m (5 ft 11 in)
- Positions: Left back; left winger

Youth career
- 1976–1978: Denizlispor

Senior career*
Years	Team	Apps	(Gls)
1980–1994	Beşiktaş	349	(4)

International career^{‡}
1986	Turkey	3	(0)
1987	Turkey Olympic	1	(0)

Managerial career
- 2010–2011: Silivrispor
- 2011–present: Çatalcaspor
- * Club domestic league appearances and goals as of 9 September 2011 ‡ National team caps and goals as of 9 September 2011

Kadir Akbulut (born 8 May 1960) is a former Turkish footballer and current coach and occasional newspaper columnist. Played at Denizlispor youth division, Akbulut served for Beşiktaş for his entire professional career.

== Career ==
=== Player ===
==== Club ====
Akbulut began playing football at the youth level with Denizlispor, before joining Beşiktaş in 1980, where he played for 14 seasons during one of the most successful periods in the team's history. During his years at Beşiktaş, he played 349 league matches (322 in starting line-up), scored 4 times, and received 39 yellow cards. He was also part of undefeated champion squad of 1991-92 season. Additionally, he played at European competitios, making 6 appearances in UEFA Champions League between 1982 and 1992, and competing in the Cup Winners' Cup twice during the 1997–98 season.

==== International ====
Akbulut played in Turkey national football team in Olympic and senior levels, called up to the team in total of 4 matches.

=== Manager ===
The first coaching experience of Kadir Akbulut was Silivrispor, a Turkish Regional Amateur League team of Silivri district of Istanbul, until his resignation on 3 March 2011. On 1 July 2011, he was hired by Çatalcaspor, another amateur league team located in Istanbul. Managed by Akbulut, Çatalcaspor promoted to 3. Lig at professional stage, for the first time at their history, following 1–0 ended play-off encounter against Edirnespor Gençlik S.K., on 6 May 2014. Akbulut earned a one-year extension for his contract at Çatalcaspor in June 2014.

== Honours ==

91-92 season undefeated squad
- Beşiktaş
  - Turkish League: 4 (1985–86, 1989–90, 1990–91, 1991–92)
  - Turkish Cup: 3 (1993–94, 1988–89, 1989–90)
  - Presidential Cup: 4 (1985–86, 1988–89, 1991–92, 1993–94)
  - Chancellor Cup: 1 (1987–88)
  - TSYD Cup: 6 (1984, 1985, 1988, 1990, 1991, 1993)
