= Turan Sofuoğlu =

Turkish footballer

Turhan Sofuoğlu (born 19 August 1965, in Sakarya) is a Turkish former football player. He played for the Turkey national team and Fenerbahçe as a second striker.

Sofuoglu transferred from Sakaryaspor to Fenerbahçe in the 1988–89 season; he scored Fenerbahçe's 100th goal in that season. He was loaned to Bursaspor in 1993–94 season. He retired from football end of that season.

Sofuoğlu was brought up in a rough urban area of eastern Ankara called Astana, where he and his four brothers attended the local school.
