= Oğuz Çetin =

Turkish footballer

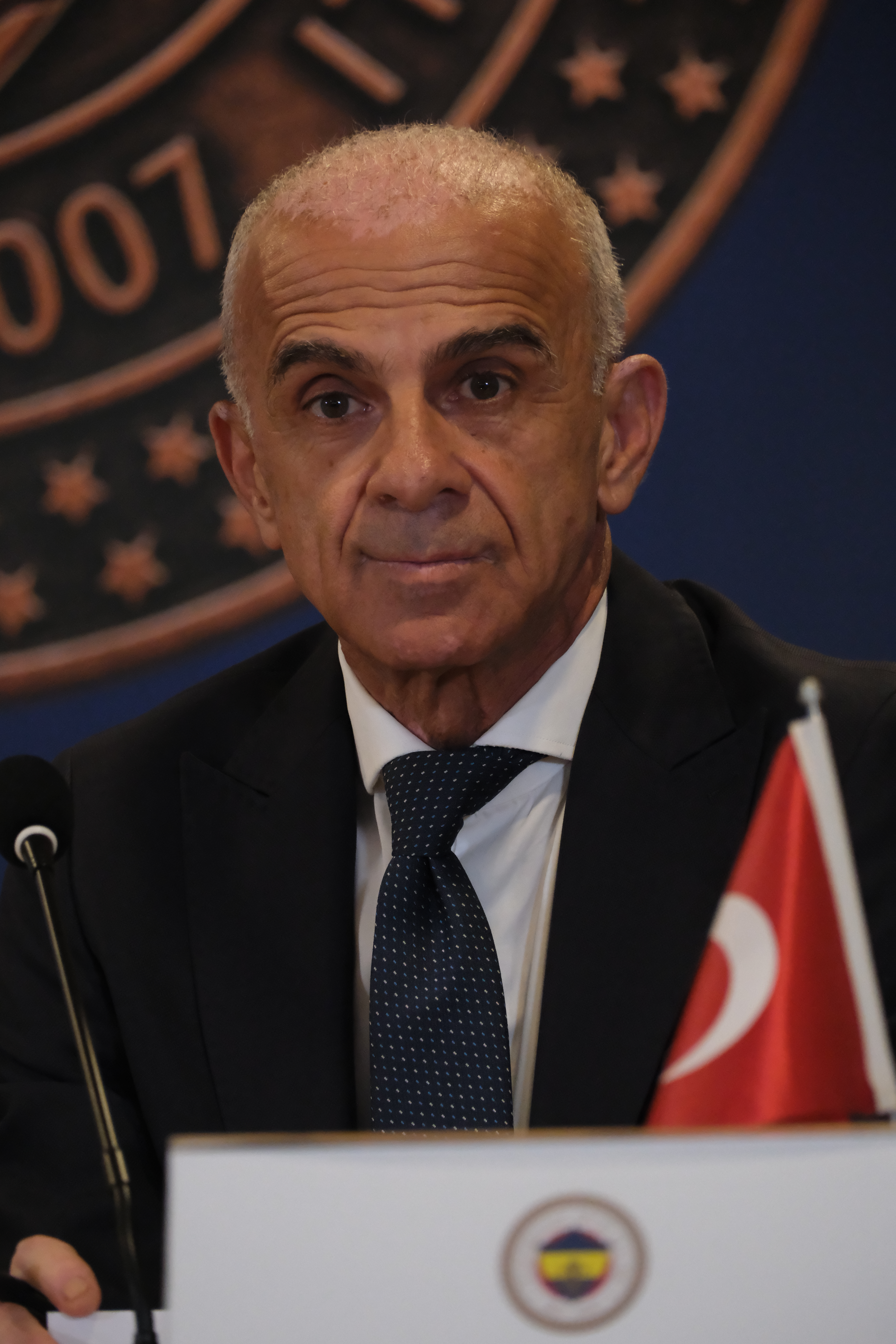

Personal information
- Full name: Ahmet Oğuz Çetin
- Date of birth: 15 February 1963 (age 63)
- Place of birth: Adapazarı, Turkey
- Height: 1.83 m (6 ft 0 in)
- Position: Midfielder

Youth career
- 1979–1981: Sakaryaspor

Senior career*
Years	Team	Apps	(Gls)
1981–1988	Sakaryaspor	146	(12)
1988–1996	Fenerbahçe	274	(52)
1996–1998	İstanbulspor	72	(9)
1998–2002	Adanaspor	50	(6)
Total		503	(79)

International career
1980	Turkey U18	2	(0)
1984	Turkey U21	1	(0)
1987–1988	Turkey U23	7	(0)
1987–1998	Turkey	70	(3)

Managerial career
- 2002–2003: Fenerbahçe
- 2004: Kayseri Erciyesspor
- 2004: Gençlerbirliği
- 2005: Diyarbakırspor
- 2006–2009: Turkey (assistant)
- 2010: Turkey
- 2010–2011: Turkey (assistant)
- 2012–2013: Boluspor
- 2014: Khazar Lankaran
- 2017: Gaziantep BB
- * Club domestic league appearances and goals

Ahmet Oğuz Çetin (born 15 February 1963) is a Turkish football manager and former football player who played as a midfielder.

== Career ==
Born in Adapazarı, Çetin began playing football with the local side Sakaryaspor. He started to play regularly for Fenerbahçe in 1988. He became one of the franchise players for Fenerbahçe and Turkish football generally. He is well known for his superior ability to organize the midfield and also had a decent vision, passing and shooting skills. He is known as "emperor" by Turkish soccer fans. Mostly walking on the pitch, Oguz Cetin was more of a distributor. Best known for his milimetric passes, he led Fenerbahçe to the championship in 1995–96 season but Fenerbahçe chairman Ali Haydar Şen released Oğuz Çetin and his fellow striker Aykut Kocaman with the thought they have been destroying the harmony in the team. Çetin played for Istanbulspor and Adanaspor after he was released by Fenerbahçe in 1996.

He was capped 70 times for the Turkey national football team. He represented his country at the 1996 UEFA European Championship in England.

After his playing career ended, Çetin became assistant manager for Fenerbahçe in 2002. After Werner Lorant's dismissal, he worked as a manager for Fenerbahçe. However, he failed to manage the team well. He also worked as a manager for Gençlerbirliği and Diyarbakırspor.

He signed a one-year contract with Azerbaijani football team Khazar Lankaran in June 2014, resigning in the December of the same year.
