= Aykut Kocaman =

Turkish footballer

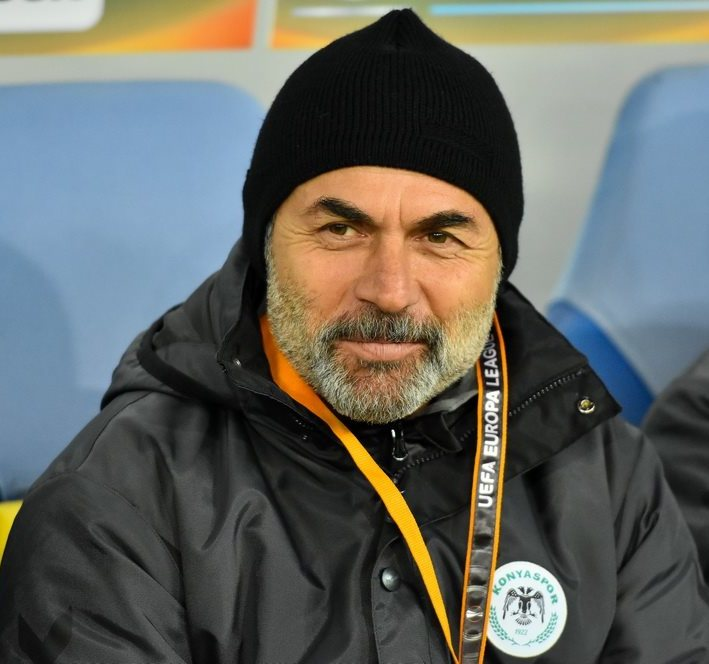
- Kocaman as manager of Konyaspor in 2016

Personal information
- Full name: Aykut Kocaman
- Date of birth: 5 April 1965 (age 61)
- Place of birth: Geyve, Sakarya, Turkey
- Height: 1.74 m (5 ft 9 in)
- Position: Striker

Senior career*
Years	Team	Apps	(Gls)
1984–1988	Sakaryaspor	68	(23)
1988–1996	Fenerbahçe	210	(140)
1996–2000	İstanbulspor	82	(37)
Total		360	(200)

International career
1992–1995	Turkey	15	(1)

Managerial career
- 2000–2004: İstanbulspor
- 2004–2005: Malatyaspor
- 2005–2006: Konyaspor
- 2006–2007: Ankaraspor
- 2008–2009: Ankaraspor
- 2009–2010: Fenerbahçe (sporting director)
- 2010–2013: Fenerbahçe
- 2014–2017: Konyaspor
- 2017–2018: Fenerbahçe
- 2018–2020: Konyaspor
- 2021: Başakşehir
- * Club domestic league appearances and goals

Aykut Kocaman (Turkish pronunciation: [ajkut kodʒaman], born 5 April 1965) is a former Turkish footballer, who played as a striker. Before he made his debut 1980 with the amateur club Kabataş Altınmızrak in Istanbul, Kocaman performed gymnastics at the club Eczacıbaşı, winning 40 medals and reaching second place at the national level. 1984, he moved to Sakaryaspor in Adapazarı, Sakarya and turned professional. In 1988, Kocaman signed a contract with Fenerbahçe, where he played and contributed much to the success of his club until he was transferred to Istanbulspor in 1996.

He is one of only five players who have scored 200 goals in Süper Lig history. He was dismissed by Fenerbahçe despite his championship winning goal in the third from last game of the season against Trabzonspor. Kocaman played four seasons for Istanbulspor before retirement in 2000. Some say he played his last years to pass the 200 goal barrier. He was famous for a special move, where he would ease a high-pass on his chest and rocket the ball to the goal. In his playing years some fans named this move "Aykut" after him.

== Career ==
=== Early career ===
After his career as a player Kocaman served as manager of Istanbulspor for four successive seasons. Uzan Family withdrew its support from Istanbulspor in 2001. Because of this, Istanbulspor fell into financial crisis, and became 9th in 2002–03 finally in 2003. In 2004, financial problems at Istanbulspor forced him to leave and he signed a two-year contract to coach Malatyaspor. He resigned in March 2005 from his duty at Malatyaspor. He coached Konyaspor in the 2005–06 season and Ankaraspor in the 2006–07 season. He returned to Ankaraspor in the 2008–09 season. He mentored the talented Turkish winger Özer Hurmacı and introduced him to professional football. He became Fenerbahçe's sporting director in the 2009–10 season.

=== Fenerbahçe ===
==== 2010–11 first year; alleged match-fixing investigation ====
On 26 June 2010, Kocaman was announced as Fenerbahçe's new manager, taking over from Germany's Christoph Daum. Kocaman officialized his new role as team coach in a signing ceremony held at the Şükrü Saracoğlu Stadium. Fenerbahçe's President Aziz Yıldırım said; "Everyone knows Aykut Kocaman's place in the history of Fenerbahçe. We all know how the supporters and community appreciate him. It gives me pleasure to see what we expected to take place in three years to actually happen today". Kocaman when joining as Fenerbahçe's Manager; "There are no words to describe this moment. I highly appreciate the club's management for their utter support i am thrilled and excited. I hope this new role of mine will be beneficiary to both myself and Fenerbahçe. In my personal life, I am a fearless person. I am never afraid of anything, however, what worries me most is not living up to people's expectations. Apart from that, I don't have any other concern". Kocaman Despite a bad start which included being knocked out of the UEFA Champions League in the third qualifying round by Young Boys and knocked out of the UEFA Europa League in the Play-off round by PAOK. However, in January Fenerbahçe knocked out of the 2010–11 Türkiye Kupası in the group stage. On 22 May 2011, Fenerbahçe won an 18th Süper Lig title in the 2010–11 season with a 4–3 win over Sivasspor moving ahead of the 17 titles won by arch-rivals Galatasaray. Despite a 9-points deficit after 16 games, Fenerbahçe went on to an astonishing 17 wins and one draw from the last 18 games of the season and won the title with 82 points. Trabzonspor also finished on 82 points but were held back to due head-to-head goal average in favor of Fenerbahçe. Kocaman is the only name in Fenerbahçe history‚ who won the championship both as a player and as a manager. In July 2011, as part of a major match-fixing investigation by authorities in Turkey, nearly 60 people suspected to be involved with fixing games were detained by İstanbul Police Department Organized Crime Control Bureau and then arrested by the court due to its involvement in the 2011 Turkish football match-fixing scandal. On 6 November 2020, the Turkish court declared all suspects innocent in the investigation.

==== 2011–12 second year; withdraw from the Champions League ====
On 19 July 2011, the TFF announced that the Turkish Super Cup game between Süper Lig champion Fenerbahçe and Türkiye Kupası winner Beşiktaş was postponed to an unknown date due to prosecution investigation. As a consequence of the match-fixing allegations, UEFA demanded that Fenerbahçe withdraw from the 2011–12 Champions League. The club refused but, under pressure from UEFA, the TFF withdrew them from the competition, giving Fenerbahçe's place to second-placed Trabzonspor. On 5 September, Fenerbahçe have appointed the lawyers Emin Öztürk and Jean-Louis Dupont and opened a court case against UEFA and the TFF at the CAS over their exclusion from the Champions League. The case is opened with a demand now for €45 million and reserving the right for more in connection with our material loss due to the said exclusion.

The following season, after this scandal Fenerbahçe on 12 September 2011 in the opening match of the Super Lig season, have a victory 1–0 against Orduspor. On 16 September 2011 Süper Lig second round Fenerbahçe was winning against Gaziantepspor with score 3–1. In July 2011, Fenerbahçe fans invaded the pitch during a friendly against the Ukrainian champions Shakhtar Donetsk. As punishment, Fenerbahçe was sentenced to two Süper Lig games in empty stadia. The TFF later allowed those two games to be filled with spectators; the men were barred while women and children under twelve got in for free. The team plans to have similar promotions during the rest of the season in order to increase attendance and reduce violence, and Fenerbahçe in this match draw against Manisaspor with score 1–1. On 14 December 2011, Kocaman downplays Emre Belözoğlu's bust-up with teammate, and denies punch claims. The veteran midfielder was rumoured to have attacked his boss during a spat with fellow player Cristian Baroni, but this has been rubbished by the Turkish club. Kocaman has admitted he was annoyed with Emre Belözoğlu's recent behaviour in a bust-up with a teammate, but denies that the midfielder threw a punch at him. The former Inter and Newcastle man was reported to have had a disagreement with fellow player Cristian Baroni after the Süper Lig side's 2–0 win over Bursaspor on Monday night. During the incident, the 31-year-old was believed to have tried to strike his boss, and has subsequently been suspended for the time being. However, Kocaman has since insisted that the punch claims are untrue. "I was angry with Emre arguing in the changing room with Cristian, but there was no punch-up," the 46-year-old told Dogan News Agency. When quizzed on the incident, Emre seemed to think that it was a minor disagreement that has been blown out of proportion by the press. 'This is nothing too serious. I feel I don't need to comment on the issue," the Turkey international told Anadolu News Agency.

On 16 January 2012, Monday evening as a last-gasp goal on Monday gave Kocaman's Fenerbahçe, aka the Yellow Canaries, a hard-fought 2–1 away victory over Manisaspor in week 20 of the Süper Lig. The victory at 16561Manisa's 19 Mayıs Stadium not only reduced the gap between the Canaries and runaway leader Galatasaray to four points, it also kept the Canaries firmly in the playoff race for this season's championship. On 29 January 2012, Kocaman's Fenerbahçe seeks redemption, 1.000th victory at Kadıköy. Fenerbahçe, stunned 3–2 by Istanbul BB on Wednesday, will be seeking redemption when they host struggling newcomer Mersin İdman Yurdu in week 23 of the Süper Lig at the Şükrü Saracoğlu Stadium in Kadıköy on Sunday evening. The Canaries will also be striving for their 1.000th league victory, something they failed to realize after the debacle during the "mini" Istanbul derby against Istanbul BB at Atatürk Olympic Stadium on Wednesday. Despite the loss to Istanbul BB, Kocaman's Canaries are still favored to make the play-offs at the end of the regular season. Kocaman and his men do not seem perturbed at all because all the coaches are currently talking about the play-offs at the end of the regular season, not the league championship itself. One thing, however, is crystal clear: The Canaries should avoid dropping points from now on. On 18 February 2012, Kocaman's Fenerbahçe thus became the first football team in the land to garner 3.001 points in 1.759 matches in 54 seasons since the inception of the Süper Lig in 1959. It is also worth noting that the Fenerbahçe were the first team to record 1.000 league victories. Saturday's victory also meant the Fenerbahçe extending their unbeaten run at Kadıköy to 36 games. Never since Fenerbahçe was beaten 3–2 by Bursaspor in week 22 of the 2009–10 season on 22 February 2010, has the team tasted defeat again at home. In the 36 league matches played since then, the Fenerbahçe have won 30 and drawn six. In the same game Kocaman, Sivasspor victory was the owner of a new record. Fenerbahçe have won 9 Süper Lig field in his last 9 games. The last seven seasons by beating Fenerbahçe shame 27-week field line inside the field caught the longest wins. Christoph Daum 2004–05 season Fenerbahçe team had won 14 games with the top of the inner field. Kocaman's Fenerbahçe during the past season on top of the inner field match-winning 8, on the 9th game Bursaspor match was tied 0–0 with the site. Kocaman, Sivasspor match the longest winning 4–2 series victory by finishing the last season, passed to the internal field. On 8 March 2012, Kocaman's contract extended for 3 years. Fenerbahçe has extended the contract of Kocaman for three years, the club said in a written statement on Thursday. Fenerbahçe said in the statement published on the club's official website that a signing ceremony will be held at Şükrü Saracoğlu Stadium next week for Kocaman, cited as the person who embodies Fenerbahçe spirit. It is also noted that the decision regarding players whose contracts expire at the end of this season will be made after the season ends. On 13 March 2012, Kocaman signed the 3-year contract in a signing ceremony held at Şükrü Saracoğlu Stadium with the club official Ali Yıldırım. Yıldırım congratulated Kocaman and wished him luck in the upcoming period. He added that Kocaman stood strong when the club was going through turbulent times in the face of match-fixing scandal. On 27 April 2012, Fenerbahçe has advanced to the final in the Turkish Cup after beating Karabükspor 2–0 in a semi-final game in Ankara on Thursday. Kocaman said at a post-game press conference that he is happy his team has clinched a place in the Turkish Cup, one of their targeted finals. The other final that Fenerbahçe is seeking is the championship play-offs of Süper Lig. There will be no actual final in the play-offs, but the team still lags behind Galatasaray by two points and is trying to gain an advantageous position to win the league title. Fenerbahçe last won the coveted Turkish Cup in 1983 and is yearning to end the waiting of its fans. On 12 May 2012, Fenerbahçe lose the Süper Lig title with a 0–0 draw at arch-rivals Galatasaray on Saturday after a season marred by an ongoing court investigation into match-fixing allegations against leading clubs. In a highly charged derby that Fenerbahçe needed to win to retain the championship, Galatasaray hung on against the more attack-minded home side as red cards reduced both sides to 10 men in the second half. On 16 May 2012, Fenerbahçe win Turkish Cup for first time in 29 years trounced Bursaspor 4–0 to win the Turkish Cup for the first time in 29 years on Wednesday, gaining some consolation for finishing runners-up in the league to Galatasaray. After this title Kocaman is the only domestic name in Fenerbahçe history‚ who won the championship and domestic cup

==== 2012–2013 third year; semi–final in Europa League ====
Kocaman stated pre-season that Fenerbahçes long-term aim is to win the Süper Lig. Fenerbahçe will begin the new season in the Champions League Third qualifying round against 2011–12 Liga I Runner-up Vaslui on 1 August 2012, at Şükrü Saracoğlu Stadium. In 2012–13 Season's first match Kocaman's Fenerbahçe salvage late draw against Vaslui on Champions League in Third qualifying round with score 1–1. On 8 August 2012, Kocaman add first win in UEFA competitions in his managerial career against Vaslui on Champions League in Third qualifying round with score 4–1 and Fenerbahçe secured a place in the UEFA Champions League play-off round. On 12 August 2012 Fenerbahçe lose the Süper Kupa final against Galatasaray with score 3–2. On 18 August 2012, in 2012–13 season's Süper Lig first match Kocaman's Fenerbahçe late a draw against Elazığspor with score 1–1. On 21 August 2012, Fenerbahçe lose the play-off round's first match against Spartak Moscow with score 2–1 in UEFA Champions League. On 24 August 2012 the Alex excluded completely from the Saturday roster by coach Kocaman. On 27 August 2012, Fenerbahçe defeated southeastern side Gaziantepspor 3–0 in week two of the Süper Lig on Saturday night for its first domestic league of the season and also for its first win in four official matches. But Saturday's victory was eclipsed by the crisis between Brazilian captain and playmaker Alex and young coach Kocaman, which saw the Brazilian excluded completely from the Saturday roster. For the record: A fit Alex has always been included in the Fener starting XI since he joined the Istanbul club in 2004. Therefore, without the slightest doubt there is something wrong somewhere. The match was played "behind closed doors," meaning adult men were banned, while women and children were allowed in for free. And even the female Fener spectators took sides, asking, "Say Kocaman, where is Alex?" And this prompted Fenerbahçe Chairman Aziz Yıldırım to grab the stadium microphone during the match maybe something unprecedented in football history and say the following: "You are mistaken," he said to the chanting fans. "Respect and support the players on the pitch. No one is greater than Fenerbahçe", he asserted. Yıldırım further said after the match: "I can give my life for Fenerbahçe. No one is above Fenerbahçe, not even Aziz Yıldırım. Players go, Aziz Yıldırım will, everyone will go, but Fenerbahçe will remain," he noted. He later said he has invited Alex for talks on Monday. On 29 August 2012, Fenerbahçe was eliminated by Spartak Moscow with aggregate score 3–2 and will enter the group stage of the 2012–13 UEFA Europa League.

On 29 September 2012, Fenerbahçe supporters call for the resignation of Kocaman following a poor display in the Süper Lig against Kasımpaşa, while Kocaman's resignation is reportedly turned down by the club administration. Kocaman, who was called on to leave his post during the game by Fenerbahçe fans, reportedly filed his resignation after the match on 29 September 2012, but the request was turned down by club chairman Aziz Yıldırım, according to reports. The Fenerbahçe coach skipped the post-game press conference and an interview with the league's official broadcaster Lig TV and sent his assistant İsmail Kartal instead, further fueling rumors about his future at the club. On 5 October 2012, Kocaman's Fenerbahçe beat Borussia Mönchengladbach and add first win in Germany in Fenerbahçe history at European competitions, also this match was 100th Kocaman's game in career with Fenerbahçe as a manager. On 29 October 2012, Antalyaspor ends Fenerbahçe's 47-match unbeaten run in the Süper Lig at Şükrü Saracoğlu Stadium in Kadıköy had to come to an end some day with score 1–3. Fenerbahçe had not lost a single match at home in Kadıköy ever since they were beaten 2–3 by eventual champion Bursaspor in week 22, on 22 February 2010. Fenerbahçe won 38 and drew nine in the 47 matches they played within 980 days since 22 February 2010. On 3 November 2012, Fenerbahçe peck Akhisar Belediyespor to break 181-day away jinx. On 22 December 2012, after defeat to Karabükspor, Kocaman has stepped down as head of the Fenerbahçe following a 2012–13 season characterised by player conflict and unimpressive results. Kocaman addressed the press following a 3–1 loss, stating: "First of all, I want to congratulate our opponent Karabükspor. We predicted danger, but could not manage to deal with." Kocaman criticised his team's inability to counter the opposition's quick play, suggesting the warning he issued his players did not show itself during the action. "I warned players about the fast play of Karabükspor", he said. "Sometimes, no matter how much you talk, you are not prepared." Touching on his legacy with the club, Kocaman described his coaching role at Fenerbahçe as the pinnacle of his career, but admitted the toils of the position proved too demanding for him. "As a former Fenerbahçe player, being a coach in this team is the top of my coaching career. After two and a half years, I could not find enough strength to continue. "I struggled too much and I can not carry on anymore. Thanks to everyone." But on 27 December 2012, Kocaman has remained at the helm of the Fenerbahçe, retracting his decision to resign. "Kocaman has already made up his mind [to stay]," Fenerbahçe board member Abdullah Kiğılı told NTV Spor. "He will prepare a report on transfers and we will work on them. We will sign three players in January." On 14 March 2013 Kocaman's Fenerbahçe advanced to the quarter-finals in the 2012–13 UEFA Europa League with a 1–1 draw at home in its second-leg match against Czech side Viktoria Plzeň on Thursday. On 11 April 2013, Kocaman advance his team Fenerbahçe to the semi-finals in the 2012–13 UEFA Europa League, and he make the history with his club to the first time in club's history. On 2 May 2013, Fenerbahçe was eliminated by Benfica with aggregate score 3–2 in 2012–13 Europa League in semi-final, and this is the biggest success in Fenerbahçe's history to arrive into the Semi-final in European competitions. On 29 May 2013, Kocaman submits his resignation as Fenerbahçe coach, saying that he is 'exhausted.' The former goal-scoring great is set to leave the club only a week after leading the Istanbul club to a second successive Turkish Cup.

=== Konyaspor ===
==== Second term at Konyaspor ====
On 27 October 2014 Kocaman signed a two-year deal with Konyaspor as their new manager. In 2015–16 Kocaman's Konyaspor finally finished Süper Lig as 3rd, also the best result for them, and qualified for the UEFA Europa League. In 2016–17 they played for the first time in their history in European competitions and draw in Group H with Shakhtar Donetsk, Braga and Gent. On 31 May 2017 Kocaman's Konyaspor defeated İstanbul Başakşehir to win their first ever Turkish Cup in their club's 95-year history. In the first Turkish Cup final since the 2007–08 Turkish Cup season in which none of Istanbul's "big three" clubs Beşiktaş, Fenerbahçe and Galatasaray were competing, Konyaspor against İstanbul Başakşehir finished regular and extra time tied 0–0 and win after penalty shootout with result 4–1. On 2 June 2017, Kocaman told the club's board that he wanted to leave Konyaspor for his old club Fenerbahçe.

=== Fenerbahçe ===
==== Second term at Fenerbahçe ====
On 16 June 2017, Kocaman returned as Fenerbahçe boss to replace Dick Advocaat. Kocaman signed a two-year contract to begin a second term as head coach. He finished 2nd behind champions Galatasaray and experienced another Turkish Cup final in which he lost 3–2 to Akhisarspor.

Ali Koç, who was elected as the new president of Fenerbahçe in the elections held on 3 June 2018, terminated his contract with Fenerbahçe on 18 June 2018.

=== Başakşehir ===
Kocaman signed as manager of Istanbul Başakşehir FK on January 30, 2021, a post had been vacated by Okan Buruk a day before.

On February 1, 2021, coach Kocaman a signed 2.5 year contract with Istanbul Başakşehir FK. Out of the 29 matches Kocaman managed Başakşehir, he only won 9 matches, drawing 6 and losing in 14 of them. On October 2, 2021, his letter of resignation from the manager position was accepted by the Istanbul Başakşehir management.

== Managerial statistics ==
As of 1 October 2021

Managerial record by team and tenure
Team	Nat	League	From	To	Record					PPM
Team	Nat	League	From	To	G	W	D	L	Win %	PPM
İstanbulspor	(Turkey)	Süper Lig	1 July 2000	30 June 2004	147	52	33	62	35.37	1.29
Malatyaspor	(Turkey)	Süper Lig	30 June 2004	30 March 2005	27	10	4	13	37.04	1.26
Konyaspor	(Turkey)	Süper Lig	1 July 2005	15 May 2006	39	15	11	13	38.46	1.44
Ankaraspor	(Turkey)	Süper Lig	15 May 2006	8 October 2007	47	12	23	12	25.53	1.27
Ankaraspor	(Turkey)	Süper Lig	26 May 2008	30 June 2009	43	16	10	17	37.21	1.35
Fenerbahçe	(Turkey)	Süper Lig	26 June 2010	29 May 2013	151	89	32	30	58.94	2.01
Konyaspor	(Turkey)	Süper Lig	27 October 2014	3 June 2017	133	59	33	41	44.36	1.58
Fenerbahçe	(Turkey)	Süper Lig	16 June 2017	18 June 2018	47	29	11	7	61.70	2.07
Konyaspor	(Turkey)	Süper Lig	19 November 2018	9 February 2020	44	9	20	15	20.45	1.07
İstanbul Başakşehir	(Turkey)	Süper Lig	1 February 2021	2 October 2021	29	9	6	14	31.03	1.14
Total					707	300	183	224	42.43	1.53

== Honours ==
=== Player honours ===
  - Süper Lig
    - Winners: 1988–89, 1995–96
  - Turkish Cup
    - Winners: 1987–88
  - Turkish Super Cup
    - Winners: 1990

=== Managerial honours ===
  - Süper Lig
    - Winners: 2010–11
  - Turkish Cup
    - Winners: 2011–12, 2012–13, 2016-17

== Career statistics ==
As of 31 May 2017

=== Club ===
Club	Season	League		Turkish Cup		Europe		Other		Total	
Club	Season	Apps	Goals	Apps	Goals	Apps	Goals	Apps	Goals	Apps	Goals
Sakaryaspor	1984–85	9	1	1	0	-	-	-	-	10	1
Sakaryaspor	1985–86	29	6	5	0	-	-	-	-	34	6
Sakaryaspor	1986–87	0	0	1	0	-	-	-	-	1	0
Sakaryaspor	1987–88	30	16	8	3	-	-	1 (Note: Appearance in Turkish Super Cup)	0	39	19
Sakaryaspor	Total	68	23	15	3	0	0	1	0	84	26
Fenerbahçe	1988–89	34	29	9	3	-	-	1	0	44	32
Fenerbahçe	1989–90	31	10	2	1	2 (Note: Appearance in UEFA Champions League)	0	1	1	36	12
Fenerbahçe	1990–91	19	13	2	2	4 (Note: Appearance in UEFA Europa League)	1	0	0	25	16
Fenerbahçe	1991–92	25	25	1	0	-	-	0	0	26	25
Fenerbahçe	1992–93	18	14	3	2	4	3	0	0	25	19
Fenerbahçe	1993–94	17	14	2	0	-	-	0	0	19	14
Fenerbahçe	1994–95	34	27	6	2	4	3	0	0	44	32
Fenerbahçe	1995–96	32	8	6	4	4	1	0	0	42	13
Fenerbahçe	Total	210	140	31	14	18	8	2	1	261	163
İstanbulspor	1996–97	22	9	0	0	-	-	0	0	22	9
İstanbulspor	1997–98	25	16	3	1	4 (Note: Appearance in UEFA Intertoto Cup)	3	0	0	32	20
İstanbulspor	1998–99	16	7	2	0	1	1	0	0	19	8
İstanbulspor	1999–00	19	5	2	0	-	-	0	0	21	5
İstanbulspor	Total	82	37	7	1	5	4	0	0	94	42
Career totals		360	200	53	18	23	12	3	1	439	231

=== International ===
Turkey national team
Year	Apps	Goals
1992	6	0
1993	1	0
1994	4	0
1995	4	1
Total	15	1

=== International goals ===
Goal	Date	Venue	Opponent	Score	Result	Competition
1.	8 March 1995	Fenerbahçe Stadium, Istanbul, Turkey	Israel	1–1	Win	Friendly

=== Career totals ===
Professional career totals
Teams	Appearances	Goals	Goals per game
Clubs	439	231	0.53
National team	15	1	0.07
Total	458	232	0.51

== Personal life ==
Kocaman is married to Arzu and they have two daughters named Ekin and Yağmur.

== Bibliography ==
- Barış Tut, "Kocaman Bir Adam Sıradışı Bir Teknik Direktörün Portresi", Edition n°1, 2004, 380 p
