= List of populated places in Hatay Province =

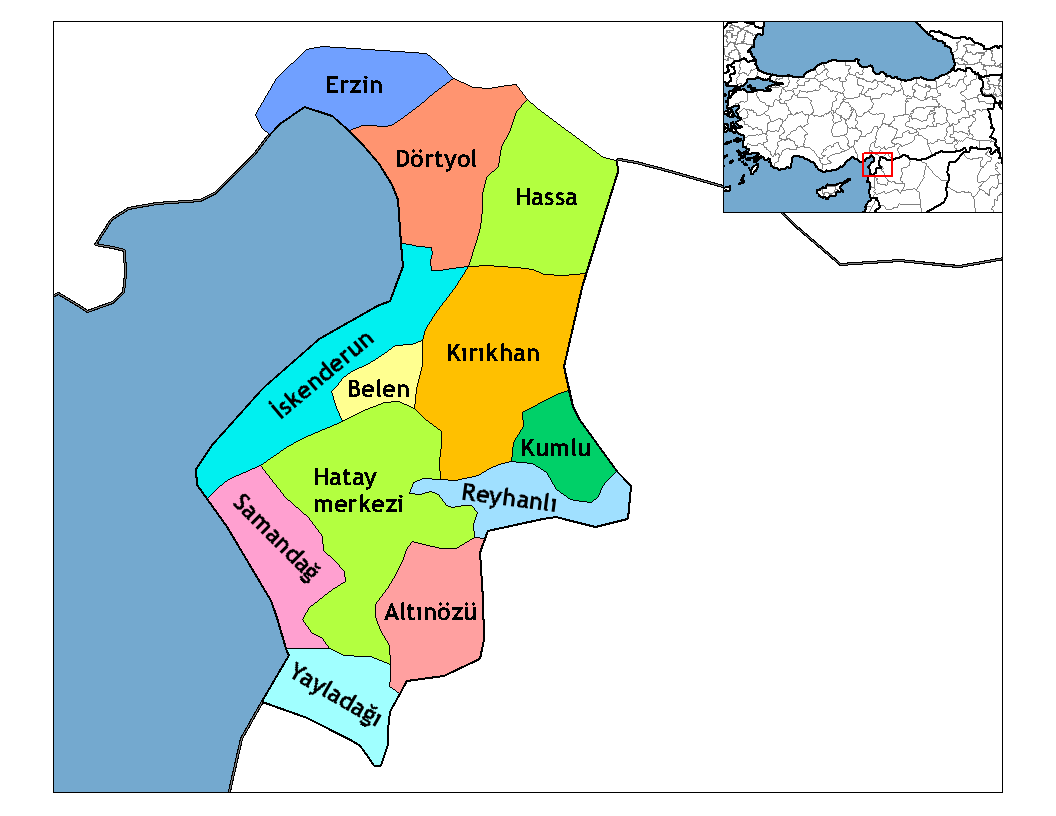
Hatay Province

Below is the list of populated places in Hatay Province, Turkey by the districts. Unlike most other provinces of Turkey, in Hatay the capital of the province and the province don't bear the same name. The capital of the province is Antakya. In the following lists first place in each list is the administrative center of the district.

== Antakya ==
- Antakya
- Açıkdere, Antakya
- Akcurun, Antakya
- Akçaova, Antakya
- Akhisar, Antakya
- Alaattin, Antakya
- Alahan, Antakya
- Alazı, Antakya
- Anayazı, Antakya
- Apaydın, Antakya
- Arpahan, Antakya
- Aşağıoba, Antakya
- Aşağıokçular, Antakya
- Avsuyu, Antakya
- Bahçeköy, Antakya
- Balıklıdere, Antakya
- Ballıöz, Antakya
- Bitiren, Antakya
- Bohşin, Antakya
- Bostancık, Antakya
- Bozhöyük, Antakya
- Bozlu, Antakya
- Büyükdalyan, Antakya
- Çardaklı, Antakya
- Çatbaşı, Antakya
- Çayır, Antakya
- Çekmece, Antakya
- Dağdüzü, Antakya
- Değirmenyolu, Antakya
- Demirköprü, Antakya
- Derince, Antakya
- Dikmece, Antakya
- Doğanköy, Antakya
- Döver, Antakya
- Dursunlu, Antakya
- Ekinci, Antakya
- Gökçegöz, Antakya
- Gülderen, Antakya
- Gümüşgöze, Antakya
- Güneysöğüt, Antakya
- Günyazı, Antakya
- Güzelburç, Antakya
- Hanyolu, Antakya
- Harbiye, Antakya
- Hasanlı, Antakya
- Karaali, Antakya
- Karlısu, Antakya
- Karşıyaka, Antakya
- Kisecik, Antakya
- Koçören, Antakya
- Kuruyer, Antakya
- Kuzeytepe, Antakya
- Küçükdalyan, Antakya
- Madenboyu, Antakya
- Mansurlu, Antakya
- Maraşboğazı, Antakya
- Maşuklu, Antakya
- Melekli, Antakya
- Meydancık, Antakya
- Narlıca, Antakya
- Odabaşı, Antakya
- Oğlakören, Antakya
- Orhanlı, Antakya
- Ovakent, Antakya
- Paşaköy, Antakya
- Saçaklı, Antakya
- Samankaya, Antakya
- Saraycık, Antakya
- Serinyol, Antakya
- Sinanlı, Antakya
- Sofular, Antakya
- Subaşı, Antakya
- Suvatlı, Antakya
- Şenköy, Antakya
- Tahtaköprü, Antakya
- Tanışma, Antakya
- Toygarlı, Antakya
- Turfanda, Antakya
- Turunçlu, Antakya
- Uzunaliç, Antakya
- Üçgedik, Antakya
- Üzümdalı, Antakya
- Yaylacık, Antakya
- Yeşilova, Antakya
- Yeşilpınar, Antakya
- Yoncakaya, Antakya
- Yukarıokçular, Antakya
- Zülüflühan, Antakya

== Altınözü ==
- Altınözü
- Akamber, Altınözü
- Akdarı, Altınözü
- Alakent, Altınözü
- Altınkaya, Altınözü
- Atayurdu, Altınözü
- Avuttepe, Altınözü
- Babatorun
- Boynuyoğun, Altınözü
- Büyükburç, Altınözü
- Çetenli, Altınözü
- Dokuzdal, Altınözü
- Enek, Altınözü
- Erbaşı, Altınözü
- Gözecik, Altınözü
- Günvuran, Altınözü
- Hacıpaşa, Altınözü
- Kamberli, Altınözü
- Kansu, Altınözü
- Karbeyaz, Altınözü
- Karsu, Altınözü
- Kazancık, Altınözü
- Keskincik, Altınözü
- Kılıçtutan, Altınözü
- Kıyıgören, Altınözü
- Kolcular, Altınözü
- Kozkalesi, Altınözü
- Kurtmezraası, Altınözü
- Mayadalı, Altınözü
- Oymaklı, Altınözü
- Sarıbük, Altınözü
- Seferli, Altınözü
- Sivrikavak, Altınözü
- Tepehan, Altınözü
- Tokaçlı, Altınözü
- Tokdemir, Altınözü
- Toprakhisar, Altınözü
- Türkmenmezraası, Altınözü
- Yanıkpınar, Altınözü
- Yarseli, Altınözü
- Yenihisar, Altınözü
- Yolağzı, Altınözü
- Yunushanı, Altınözü
- Ziyaret, Altınözü

== Belen ==
- Belen
- Atik, Belen
- Benlidere, Belen
- Çakallı, Belen
- Çerçikaya, Belen
- Güzelyayla, Belen
- Karapelit, Belen
- Kıcı, Belen
- Kömürçukuru, Belen
- Müftüler, Belen
- Ötençay, Belen
- Şenbük, Belen

== Dörtyol ==
- Dörtyol
- Altınçağ, Dörtyol
- Çağlalık, Dörtyol
- Çatköy, Dörtyol
- Kapılı, Dörtyol
- Karakese, Dörtyol
- Konaklı, Dörtyol
- Kozludere, Dörtyol
- Kuzuculu, Dörtyol
- Payas, Dörtyol
- Sincan, Dörtyol
- Yeniyurt, Dörtyol
- Yeşilköy, Dörtyol

== Hassa ==
- Hassa
- Akbez, Hassa
- Akkülek, Hassa
- Aktepe, Hassa
- Ardıçlı, Hassa
- Arpalıuşağı, Hassa
- Aşağıkarafakılı, Hassa
- Bademli, Hassa
- Bintaş, Hassa
- Buhara, Hassa
- Çınarbaşı, Hassa
- Dedemli, Hassa
- Demrek, Hassa
- Eğribucak, Hassa
- Gazeluşağı, Hassa
- Gülkent, Hassa
- Gülpınar, Hassa
- Güvenç, Hassa
- Hacılar, Hassa
- Haydarlar, Hassa
- Katranlık, Hassa
- Koruhüyük, Hassa
- Küreci, Hassa
- Mazmanlı, Hassa
- Sapanözü, Hassa
- Söğüt, Hassa
- Sugediği, Hassa
- Tiyek, Hassa
- Yeniyapan, Hassa
- Yoluklar, Hassa
- Yukarıbucak, Hassa
- Yukarıkarafakılı, Hassa
- Yuvalı, Hassa
- Zeytinoba, Hassa

== Erzin ==
- Erzin
- Aşağıburnaz, Erzin
- Başlamış, Erzin
- Gökdere, Erzin
- Gökgöl, Erzin
- Kızlarçayı, Erzin
- Kuyuluk, Erzin
- Turunçlu, Erzin
- Yeşiltepe, Erzin
- Yoncadüzü, Erzin
- Yukarıburnaz, Erzin

== İskenderun ==
- İskenderun
- Akarca, İskenderun
- Akçalı, İskenderun
- Arpaderesi, İskenderun
- Arpagedik, İskenderun
- Arsuz, İskenderun
- Aşkarbeyli, İskenderun
- Avcılarsuyu, İskenderun
- Azganlık, İskenderun
- Bekbele, İskenderun
- Bey, İskenderun
- Bitişik, İskenderun
- Büyükdere, İskenderun
- Cırtıman, İskenderun
- Çınarlı, İskenderun
- Denizciler, İskenderun
- Derekuyu, İskenderun
- Düğünyurdu, İskenderun
- Gökmeydan, İskenderun
- Gözcüler, İskenderun
- Gülcihan, İskenderun
- Güzelköy, İskenderun
- Hacıahmetli, İskenderun
- Harlısu, İskenderun
- Haymaseki, İskenderun
- Helvalı, İskenderun
- Hüyük, İskenderun
- Işıklı, İskenderun
- Kale, İskenderun
- Kaledibi, İskenderun
- Karaağaç, İskenderun
- Karagöz, İskenderun
- Karahüseyinli, İskenderun
- Karayılan, İskenderun
- Kavaklıoluk, İskenderun
- Kepirce, İskenderun
- Kışla, İskenderun
- Konacık, İskenderun
- Kozaklı, İskenderun
- Kurtbağı, İskenderun
- Madenli, İskenderun
- Nardüzü, İskenderun
- Nergizlik, İskenderu
- Orhangazi, İskenderun
- Pirinçlik, İskenderun
- Sarıseki, İskenderun
- Suçıkağı, İskenderun
- Tatarlı, İskenderun
- Tülek, İskenderun
- Üçgüllük, İskenderun
- Yukarıkepirce, İskenderun

== Kırıkhan ==
- Kırıkhan
- Abalaklı, Kırıkhan
- Adalar, Kırıkhan
- Alaybeyli, Kırıkhan
- Alibeyçağıllı, Kırıkhan
- Arkıtça, Kırıkhan
- Attutan, Kırıkhan
- Aygırgölü, Kırıkhan
- Balarmudu, Kırıkhan
- Baldıran, Kırıkhan
- Başpınar, Kırıkhan
- Bektaşlı, Kırıkhan
- Camuzkışlası, Kırıkhan
- Ceylanlı, Kırıkhan
- Çamsarı, Kırıkhan
- Çamseki, Kırıkhan
- Çataltepe, Kırıkhan
- Çiloğlanhüyüğü, Kırıkhan
- Danaahmetli, Kırıkhan
- Dedeçınar, Kırıkhan
- Delibekirli, Kırıkhan
- Demirkonak, Kırıkhan
- Gölbaşı, Kırıkhan
- Gültepe, Kırıkhan
- Güventaşı, Kırıkhan
- Güzelce, Kırıkhan
- Ilıkpınar, Kırıkhan
- İçada, Kırıkhan
- İncirli, Kırıkhan
- Kaletepe, Kırıkhan
- Kamberlikaya, Kırıkhan
- Kamışlar, Kırıkhan
- Kangallar, Kırıkhan
- Karaçağıl, Kırıkhan
- Karadurmuşlu, Kırıkhan
- Karaelmaslı, Kırıkhan
- Karamağara, Kırıkhan
- Karamankaşı, Kırıkhan
- Karataş, Kırıkhan
- Kazkeli, Kırıkhan
- Kodallı, Kırıkhan
- Kurtlusarımazı, Kırıkhan
- Kurtlusoğuksu, Kırıkhan
- Mahmutlu, Kırıkhan
- Muratpaşa, Kırıkhan
- Muratpaşakızılkaya, Kırıkhan
- Narlıhopur, Kırıkhan
- Özkızılkaya, Kırıkhan
- Özsoğuksu, Kırıkhan
- Reşatlı, Kırıkhan
- Saylak, Kırıkhan
- Söğütlüöz, Kırıkhan
- Sucuköy, Kırıkhan
- Taşoluk, Kırıkhan
- Topboğazı, Kırıkhan
- Torun, Kırıkhan
- Yalangoz, Kırıkhan
- Yılanlı, Kırıkhan

== Kumlu ==
- Kumlu
- Akkerpiç, Kumlu
- Akkuyu, Kumlu
- Akpınar, Kumlu
- Aktaş, Kumlu
- Batıayrancı, Kumlu
- Doğuayrancı, Kumlu
- Gülova, Kumlu
- Hamam, Kumlu
- Hatayhamamı, Kumlu
- Kaletepe, Kumlu
- Keli, Kumlu
- Kırcaoğlu, Kumlu
- Muharrem, Kumlu

== Reyhanlı ==
- Reyhanlı
- Ahmetbeyli, Reyhanlı
- Akyayla, Reyhanlı
- Alakuzu, Reyhanlı
- Beşaslan, Reyhanlı
- Bükülmez, Reyhanlı
- Cilvegözü, Reyhanlı
- Cumhuriyet, Reyhanlı
- Çakıryiğit, Reyhanlı
- Davutpaşa, Reyhanlı
- Fevzipaşa, Reyhanlı
- Gazimürseltepesi, Reyhanlı
- Göktepe, Reyhanlı
- Karacanlık, Reyhanlı
- Karahüyük, Reyhanlı
- Karasüleymanlı, Reyhanlı
- Kavalcık, Reyhanlı
- Konuk, Reyhanlı
- Kuletepe, Reyhanlı
- Kumtepe, Reyhanlı
- Kurtuluş, Reyhanlı
- Kuşaklı, Reyhanlı
- Mehmetbeyli, Reyhanlı
- Oğulpınar, Reyhanlı
- Paşahüyük, Reyhanlı
- Paşaköy, Reyhanlı
- Suluköy, Reyhanlı
- Tayfursökmen, Reyhanlı
- Terzihüyük, Reyhanlı
- Uzunkavak, Reyhanlı
- Üçtepe, Reyhanlı
- Varışlı, Reyhanlı

== Samandağ ==
- Samandağ
- Aknehir, Samandağ
- Ataköy, Samandağ
- Avcılar, Samandağ
- Batıayaz, Samandağ
- Büyükçat, Samandağ
- Büyükoba, Samandağ
- Ceylandere, Samandağ
- Çamlıyayla, Samandağ
- Çanakoluk, Samandağ
- Çınarlı, Samandağ
- Çöğürlü, Samandağ
- Çökek, Samandağ
- Çubuklu, Samandağ
- Değirmenbaşı, Samandağ
- Eriklikuyu, Samandağ
- Fidanlı, Samandağ
- Gözene, Samandağ
- Hancağız, Samandağ
- Hıdırbey, Samandağ
- Huzurlu, Samandağ
- Hüseyinli, Samandağ
- Kapısuyu, Samandağ
- Karaçay, Samandağ
- Koyunoğlu, Samandağ
- Kuşalanı, Samandağ
- Mağaracık, Samandağ
- Meydan, Samandağ
- Mızraklı, Samandağ
- Özbek, Samandağ
- Seldiren, Samandağ
- Sutaşı, Samandağ
- Tavla, Samandağ
- Tekebaşı, Samandağ
- Tomruksuyu, Samandağ
- Uzunbağ, Samandağ
- Üzengili, Samandağ
- Vakıflı, Samandağ
- Yaylıca, Samandağ
- Yeniçağ, Samandağ
- Yeniköy, Samandağ
- Yeşilköy, Samandağ
- Yeşilyazı, Samandağ
- Yoğunoluk, Samandağ

== Yayladağ ==
- Yayladağı
- Arslanyazı, Yayladağı
- Aşağıpulluyazı, Yayladağı
- Aydınbahçe, Yayladağı
- Ayışığı, Yayladağı
- Çabala, Yayladağı
- Çakı, Yayladağı
- Çandır, Yayladağı
- Denizgören, Yayladağı
- Eğerci, Yayladağı
- Görentaş, Yayladağı
- Gözlekçiler, Yayladağı
- Gözlüce, Yayladağı
- Gürışık, Yayladağı
- Güveççi, Yayladağı
- Güzelyurt, Yayladağı
- Hisarcık, Yayladağı
- Karacurun, Yayladağı
- Karaköse, Yayladağı
- Kışlak, Yayladağı
- Kızılçat, Yayladağı
- Kösrelik, Yayladağı
- Kulaç, Yayladağı
- Leylekli, Yayladağı
- Olgunlar, Yayladağı
- Sebenoba, Yayladağı
- Sungur, Yayladağı
- Sürütme, Yayladağı
- Şakşak, Yayladağı
- Uluyol, Yayladağı
- Üçırmak, Yayladağı
- Yalaz, Yayladağı
- Yayıkdamlar, Yayladağı
- Yeditepe, Yayladağı
- Yenice, Yayladağı
- Yeşiltepe, Yayladağı
- Yukarıpulluyazı, Yayladağı

== Recent development ==
According to Law act no 6360, all Turkish provinces with a population more than 750 000, were renamed as metropolitan municipality. Furthermore, the two new districts were established; Defne and Payas. All districts in those provinces became second level municipalities and all villages in those districts were renamed as a neighborhoods . Thus the villages listed above are officially neighborhoods of Hatay.
