= List of municipalities in Hatay Province =

This is the List of municipalities in Hatay Province, Turkey as of October 2007.

== Municipalities ==
List is sorted alphabetically A-Z, as Districts->Municipalities.

District	Municipality
Altınözü	Altınkaya
Altınözü	Altınözü
Altınözü	Hacıpaşa
Altınözü	Yiğityolu
Antakya	Antakya
Antakya	Avsuyu
Antakya	Çekmece
Antakya	Dursunlu
Antakya	Ekinci
Antakya	Gümüşgöze
Antakya	Güzelburç
Antakya	Harbiye
Antakya	Karaali
Antakya	Karlısu
Antakya	Küçükdalyan
Antakya	Kuzeytepe
Antakya	Maşuklu
Antakya	Narlıca
Antakya	Odabaşı
Antakya	Ovakent
Antakya	Serinyol
Antakya	Subaşı
Antakya	Şenköy
Antakya	Toygarlı
Antakya	Turunçlu
Antakya	Yeşilpınar
Belen	Belen
Dörtyol	Altınçağ
Dörtyol	Dörtyol
Dörtyol	Karakese
Dörtyol	Kuzuculu
Dörtyol	Payas
Dörtyol	Yeniyurt
Dörtyol	Yeşilköy
Erzin	Erzin
Hassa	Akbez
Hassa	Aktepe
Hassa	Ardıçlı
Hassa	Hassa
Hassa	Küreci
Hassa	Söğüt
İskenderun	Akçalı
İskenderun	Arsuz
İskenderun	Azganlık
İskenderun	Bekbele
İskenderun	Denizciler
İskenderun	Gökmeydan
İskenderun	Gözcüler
İskenderun	İskenderun
İskenderun	Karaağaç
İskenderun	Karayılan
İskenderun	Madenli
İskenderun	Nardüzü
İskenderun	Sarıseki
İskenderun	Üçgüllük
Kırıkhan	Kırıkhan
Kırıkhan	Kurtlusoğuksu
Kumlu	Kumlu
Reyhanlı	Reyhanlı
Samandağ	Aknehir
Samandağ	Değirmenbaşı
Samandağ	Koyunoğlu
Samandağ	Kuşalanı
Samandağ	Mağaracık
Samandağ	Mızraklı
Samandağ	Samandağ
Samandağ	Sutaşı
Samandağ	Tavla
Samandağ	Tekebaşı
Samandağ	Tomruksuyu
Samandağ	Uzunbağ
Samandağ	Yaylıca
Yayladağı	Karaköse
Yayladağı	Kışlak
Yayladağı	Yayladağı
Yayladağı	Yeditepe

== Changes in 2014 ==
According to Law act no 6360, belde (town) municipalities within provinces with more than 750000 population (so called Metropolitan municipalities in Turkey) were abolished as of 30 March 2014. 62 belde municipalities in the above list are now defunct. The list is kept for historical reference.
