= Hatay Mustafa Kemal University =

Public university in Antakya and İskenderun, Turkey

Coordinates: 36.33580°N 36.19899°E

Mustafa Kemal University
- Mustafa Kemal Üniversitesi
- Type: Public
- Established: 1992
- Rector: Veysel Eren
- Academic staff: 967
- Students: 24,900
- Location: Antakya and İskenderun, Hatay Province, Turkey
- Campus: Tayfur Sokmen Campus, Serinyol area Antakya
- Member of: EUA (since 2001)
- Website: www.mku.edu.tr

Mustafa Kemal University (Turkish: Mustafa Kemal Üniversitesi), abbreviated as MKU, is a public university established 1992 at Antakya, Hatay Province in southern Turkey. It is named after the founder of the Turkish Republic, Mustafa Kemal Atatürk.

It comprises eleven faculties, five four-year colleges, 15 two-year vocational schools, three post-graduate institutes, nine research centers, a conservatory and a university hospital. In 2010 the student enrolment of Mustafa Kemal University reached approximately 24,900 in total. The total size of the teaching faculty is 967. The main campus of the university is located in Serinyol area, 15 km (9.3 mi) north of Antakya. In 2007, the Faculty of Engineering moved from Antakya to İskenderun.

The MKU is an active member of European University Association (EUA) since 2001.

== Organization ==
=== Faculties ===
- Faculty of Agriculture
  - Agricultural Economics
  - Agricultural Machinery
  - Agricultural Structures and Irrigation
  - Animal Science (Zootechnics)
  - Field Crops
  - Food Engineering
  - Horticulture
  - Plant Protection
  - Soil Science
- Faculty of Engineering'
  - Civil Engineering
  - Computer Engineering
  - Electrical and Electronics Engineering
  - Mechanical Engineering
- Faculty of Architecture
  - Landscape Architecture
- Faculty of Education
  - Teacher Training for Primary and Secondary Schools
  - Teacher Training for Turkish
  - Teacher Training for Fine Arts
  - Teacher Training for English
- Faculty of Science and Literature
  - Archaeology
  - Chemistry
  - Physics
  - History
  - Biology
  - Anthropology
  - Geography
  - Sociology
  - Mathematics
  - History of Art
  - Turkish Language and Literature
  - Western Language and Literature
- Faculty of Fine Arts
  - Painting
  - Sculpture
  - Graphic
- Faculty of Fisheries and Aquaculture
- Faculty of Economics and Administrative Sciences
  - Business Administration
  - Economics
  - Public Administration
- Tayfur Ata Sökmen Faculty of Medicine
- Faculty of Dentistry
- Faculty of Veterinary Sciences

=== Colleges ===
Four-year colleges of MKU are:

- College of Tourism and Hotel Management
  - Tourism and Hospitality Management
  - Travel Management
  - Tourism Animation
- Hatay College of Health
  - Nursing
- College of Physical Education and Sports
  - Physical Education Teacher Training
- College of Physical Therapy and Rehabilitation
- College of Civil Aviation

=== Vocational colleges ===
Two-year vocational schools of higher education linked with the MKU are:

- Antakya Vocational College
- Dörtyol Vocational College
- İskenderun Vocational College
- Kırıkhan Vocational College
- Reyhanlı Vocational College
- Samandağı Vocational College
- Yayladağı Vocational College
- Hassa Vocational College
- Hatay Vocational College for Health Services

=== Institutes ===
Institutes are for Post-Graduate (Masters and Doctoral) studies.

- Institute of Health Sciences
  - Animal Nutrition (Masters)
  - Animal Nutrition (PhD)
  - Biochemistry (Masters)
  - Biochemistry (PhD)
  - Birth and Gynaecology (Masters)
  - Medicine Microbiology (Masters)
  - Medicine Virology (Masters)
- Reproduction and Artificial Insemination (Masters)
  - Veterinary Anatomy (Masters)
  - Veterinary Histology and Embryology (Masters)
  - Veterinary Histology and Embryology (PhD)
  - Veterinary Internal Medicine (Masters)
  - Veterinary Parasitology (Masters)
  - Veterinary Physiology (Masters)
  - Veterinary Surgery (Masters)
  - Zootecnics (Masters)
- Institute of Natural Sciences
  - Agricultural Structures and Irrigation (Masters)
  - Animal Science (Masters)
  - Biology (Masters)
  - Chemistry (Masters)
  - Civil Engineering (Masters)
  - Electrical and Electronics Engineering (Masters)
  - Field Crops (Masters)
  - Fisheries (Masters)
  - Food Engineering (Masters)
  - Horticulture (Masters)
  - Landscape Architecture (Masters)
  - Mathematics (Masters)
  - Mechanical Engineering (Masters)
  - Physics (Masters)
  - Plant Protection (Masters)
  - Plant Protection (PhD)
  - Soil Science (Masters)
- Institute of Social Sciences
  - Anthropology (Masters)
  - Archeology
  - Business Administration
  - Civil Aviation
  - Economics
  - Educational Sciences
  - Finance
  - Fine Arts Education
  - Foreign Language Education
  - Geography
  - Graphic Design (Masters)
  - History
  - History of Arts
  - Primary Education
  - Public Administration
  - Social Science Education
  - Travel Administration
  - Tourism and Hotel Management
  - Turkish Language Education

== Affiliations ==
The university is a member of the Caucasus University Association.
