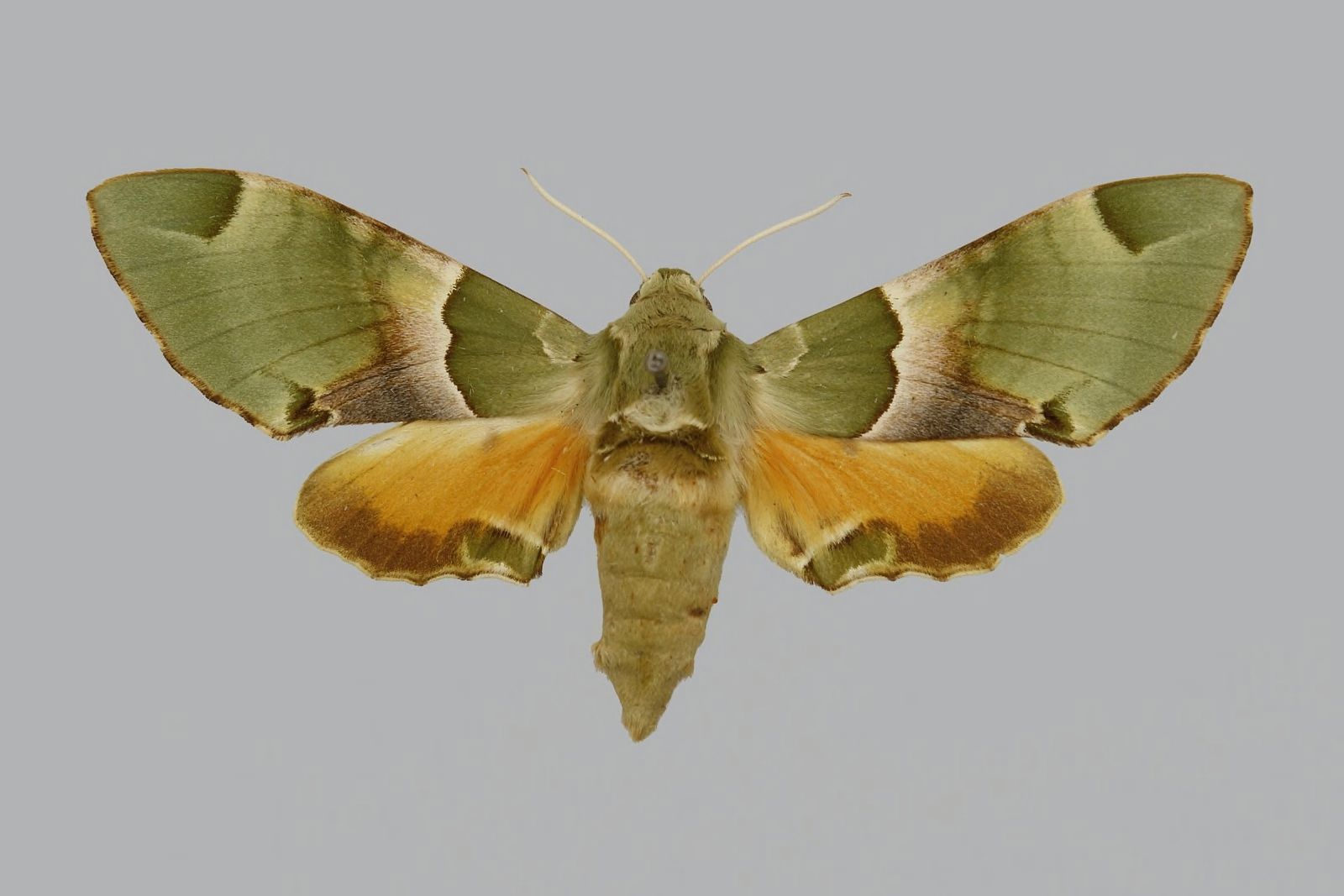

Scientific classification
- Domain: Eukaryota
- Kingdom: Animalia
- Phylum: Arthropoda
- Class: Insecta
- Order: Lepidoptera
- Family: Sphingidae
- Genus: Akbesia; Rothschild & Jordan, 1903
- Species: A. davidi

Binomial name
- Akbesia davidi (Oberthür, 1884)

Synonyms
- Smerinthus davidi Oberthür, 1884

= Akbesia =

Genus of moths

Akbesia is a monotypic moth genus in the family Sphingidae erected by Walter Rothschild and Karl Jordan in 1903. Its only species, Akbesia davidi, the pistacia hawkmoth, was first described by Charles Oberthür in 1884.

The larvae have been recorded feeding on Pistacia atlantica and terebinth (Pistacia terebinthus). Larvae have also been reared on Cotinus coggygria and Rhus coriaria.

== Etymology ==
The genus is named after the town of Akbez (near Hassa) in Turkey.

== Subspecies ==
- Akbesia davidi davidi
- Akbesia davidi gandhara de Freina & Geck, 2003 (Afghanistan)
