= Defne Magnanery =

Vocational training center in Turkey

- Defne Koza Evi
- Formation: 2015; 11 years ago
- Headquarters: Defne
- Coordinates: 36.1687°N 36.1361°E
- Official language: Turkish
- Master instructor: Tülay Genç

Defne Magnanery (Turkish: Defne Koza Evi, lit. 'Cocoon House of Defne') is a vocational training center for silk farming, located at Defne in Hatay Province, southern Turkey. It was established by the Municipality of Defne to revive the silk farming and to provide livelihood to women.

== History ==
Silk farming and weaving were common in Defne in the 1950s that sunk into oblivion in later years.

The magnanery, situated at Harbiye neighborhood, 1079 St., 34, in Defne district of Hatay Province, was established by the district municipality in 2015. The mangnan and master instructor Tülay Genç, who runs the vocational training center, started the silk farming despite objections of her family. Previously, she had been helping her husband in silk weaving. Supported by her daughter Fulya, she learned silk farming, and took a certificate of training after attending a course. For the realization of the project, her brother granted his ranch house after he watched a documentary film produced by a British television channel about his sister's silk farming activity. The project aims to train women in silk farming in order to enable them to earn their livelihood. The project, which won an award of the Association of Social Democrat Municipalities ("Sosyal Demokrat Belediyeler Derneği", SODEM), is supported by the Ministry of Culture and Tourism. Open to public on workdays, the magnanery is visited by school children, domestic and foreign tourists.

== Silk farming ==
Awaking normally in mid April, the female silkmoth lays eggs which hatch forming the silk worm. The silkworms are fed for 45 days, three times a day, on fresh mulberry leaves, which may never be dusty, wet or aged. The municipality facilitates the transport of mulberry leaves. After 35 days, the silkworm, grown and moulted several times, secretes saliva, which forms a 1,800–2,000 m (5,900–6,600 ft)-long silk fiber. The silk solidifies upon contact with air. The silkworm forms a net to completely enclose itself in a cocoon within ten days on a bunch of flixweed placed next to it. The cocoons are then soaked, and the silk filament is wound on spools. In addition to white cocoons, emphasis is put on farming of yellow colored cocoons, known as the "Hatay sarısı" ("Hatay's yellow"), which sprang from 3 kg (6.6 lb) cocoons secured under difficult conditions.

At the magnanery, around 40 women are trained annually in cultivation of silkworms and silk throwing. The Turkish Employment Agency financially supports the women attending the vocational training. As of June 2020, around 70 women completed three courses. The training center was active also during the COVID-19 pandemic in Turkey.

Silkmoth eggs, which Genç preserves, are being distributed to the graduated women for silk farming at their home. This helps to create jobs for housewives, as well as to augment the "Hatay's yellow cocoon" population, to revive and extend the silk cultivation and silk weaving. In contrast to the "white cocoon", the "yellow cocoon" produces silk of natural color yellow, which is also of higher quality. Although the "yellow cocoon" gives less silk filament length than the "white cocoon", it deserves preservation since it has natural color. In 2015, Defne Magnanery farmed a total of 254 kg (560 lb) cocoons compared to the 138 kg (304 lb) cocoons produced in Antakya in general.
