= European route E91 =

Road in trans-European E-road network

E91

Route information
- Length: 170 km (110 mi)

Major junctions
- North end: Toprakkale
- South end: Yayladağı

Location
- Countries: Turkey

Highway system
- International E-road network; A Class; B Class

The European route E91 or E91 is a European route running from Toprakkale in Turkey to the border of Syria near Yayladağı. It is 170 kilometres long.

The route has been recorded by UNECE as follows: Toprakkale - Iskenderun - Topboğazı - Antakya - Yayladağı - Syria.

== Route ==
Turkey

- O-53: Toprakkale ( E90) - Iskenderun
- D.817: Iskenderun - Topboğazı ( E98)
- D.825: Topboğazı ( E98) - Antakya - Yayladağı

Syria

- 1 Route 1: Kessab
