= Halil Gür =

Turkish-born Dutch writer (born 1951)

- Born: 14 February 1951; Karakese, Turkey
- Occupations: Writer, poet
- Writing career
- Language: Turkish, Dutch
- Genres: short stories, poetry
- Notable work: Gekke Mustafa en andere verhalen (1984)

Halil Gür (born 14 February 1951, in Karakese) is a Turkish-born Dutch writer who made his debut with his novel 'Crazy Mustafa and other stories' in 1984. He was the pioneer of a large group of Dutch writers from non-western cultures. The fact that this novel also was a sales success and won several prizes, such as the E. du Perron prize, made of Halil Gür, to cite Kader Abdolah: "a pioneer to whom other authors of non-Dutch origin have a lot to be thankful for." Abdelkader Benali wrote in the Dutch newspaper NRC Handelsblad; "I discovered Halil Gür and that was a true present for me. How he writes about his childhood is beautiful and touching; everyone should read it." Abdelkader Benali composed a book with a collection of Dutch literature for children "The Dutch literature for children in 100 and a few stories" (Prometheus, 2009) where he included two stories of Halil Gür.

Today Gür is a full-time author, writing for children, youth and adults. A poet and a story teller, he often performs at literary manifestations and reads from his own work at schools and libraries. He also gives poetry workshops at schools. In 1995 he performed at the "Night of poetry" and the daily television news (NOS-journaal) reported about him as the highlight of the evening.

The publisher Prometheus has put one of Halil's stories in the collection of stories "The desire to home. Most beautiful story's of nostalgia from the world literature". Halil Gür receives a great deal of response and recognition from readers and critics; his children's books have received several literary prizes.
