= Karsu (name) =

Karsu is a Turkish feminine given name that means "snow-broth." Notable names with the name include:

- Karsu, Turkish-Dutch singer
- Karsu, Altınözü, neighbourhood of Hatay Province

== Fictional ==
Karsu, fictional leading character in the Turkish drama, Sandık Kokusu,.
