= E98 =

E98 may refer to:

- European route E98
- King's Indian Defense, Encyclopaedia of Chess Openings code

== See also ==
- E postcode area
