= Harbiye =

Harbiye may refer to:

- Harbiye, Antakya, a town in Hatay province, Turkey
- Harbiye, Şişli, a quarter or neighbourhood in Istanbul, Turkey
- Ministry of War (Ottoman Empire)
- Turkish Military Academy
- Harp Okulu S.K., sports club of the Turkish Military Academy
