= State road D.825 (Turkey) =

D.825

Route information
- Length: 334 km (208 mi)

Major junctions
- North end: D.815 Jct.
- D.830, D.835, D.360, O.52, D.400, D.410, D.420
- South end: Yayladağı Border Crossing (to Syria)

Location
- Country: Turkey

Highway system
- Highways in Turkey; Motorways; List; State Highways; List

D.825 is a north-to-south oriented state road (Turkish: Devlet yolu) in southern Turkey. The 334 km (208 mi) long road starts at the junction to D.815 in Kayseri Province, runs through the provinces Kahramanmaraş, Gaziantep, Hatay and ends at the Yayladağı Border Crossing to Syria in Hatay Province.

== Itinerary ==
The table below shows the locations along the route.

Province	Location	Distance from previous location (km)	Distance from North end (km)	Distance from South end (km)
Kayseri	D.815 Jct.	0	0	334
Kayseri; Kahramanmaraş	Province border	3	3	331
Kahramanmaraş	Göksun, D.330 Jct.	26	29	305
Kahramanmaraş	Menzelet Dam	48	77	257
Kahramanmaraş	Kahramanmaraş, D.835 Jct.	41	118	216
Kahramanmaraş	Türkoğlu, D.360 Jct.	23	141	193
Kahramanmaraş; Gaziantep	Province border	17	158	176
Gaziantep	Motorway O.52 Jct., D.400 Jct.	8	166	168
Gaziantep	Nurdağı	2	168	166
Gaziantep	Fevzipaşa	11	179	155
Gaziantep	Islahiye	10	189	145
Gaziantep; Hatay	Province border	18	207	127
Hatay	D.410 Jct.	2	209	125
Hatay	Hassa	7	216	118
Hatay	Kırıkhan, E 98 Jct.	37	253	81
Hatay	Serinyol	23	276	58
Hatay	Hatay, D.420 Jct.	14	290	44
Hatay	Harbiye	6	296	38
Hatay	Yayladağı	33	329	5
Hatay	Yayladağı Border Crossing (to Syria) E 91	5	334	0
