= European route E98 =

Road in trans-European E-road network

E98

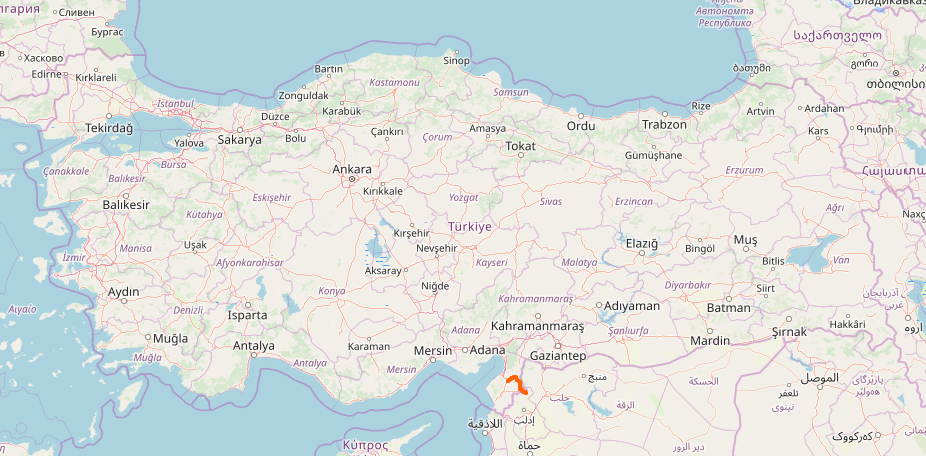

Route information
- Length: 58 km (36 mi)

Major junctions
- West end: Topboğazi
- East end: Cilvegözü

Location
- Countries: Turkey

Highway system
- International E-road network; A Class; B Class

The European route E98 or E98 is a European road running from Topboğazi in Turkey to the border with Syria.

== General ==
The European road E98 is a Class A West-East connection road and connects the Turkish city Topboğazi with the border of Syria which makes it at a length of approximately 58 kilometers. The route has been recorded by the UNECE as follows: Topboğazi - Kırıkhan - Reyhanlı - Cilvegözü - Syria.

== Route ==
Turkey

- D.825: Topboğazı ( E91) - Kırıkhan
- D.827: Kırıkhan - Reyhanlı - Cilvegözü

Syria

- M45 Motorway 45: Bab al-Hawa
