= Avuttepe =

Coordinates: 36°03′N 36°16′E

Avuttepe (formerly Kfer Abid) is a neighbourhood of the municipality and district of Altınözü, Hatay Province, Turkey. Its population is 493 (2022). It is populated by Sunni Arabs.
