= Çay, Hassa =

Village in Hatay Province, Turkey

Çay
- Neighbourhood
- Location in Turkey
- Coordinates: 36°48′5″N 36°31′10″E
- Country: Turkey
- Province: Hatay
- District: Hassa
- Population (2022): 1,116
- Time zone: UTC+3 (TRT)

Çay is a neighbourhood of the municipality and district of Hassa, Hatay Province, Turkey. The village had a population of 1,116 in 2022.
