= Yoluklar, Hassa =

Village in Hatay Province, Turkey

Yoluklar
- Neighbourhood
- Location in Turkey
- Coordinates: 36°47′13″N 36°27′15″E
- Country: Turkey
- Province: Hatay
- District: Hassa
- Population (2022): 374
- Time zone: UTC+3 (TRT)

Yoluklar is a neighbourhood in the municipality and district of Hassa, Hatay Province, Turkey. The village had a population of 374 in 2022.

In late 19th century, German orientalist Martin Hartmann listed the village as a settlement of 4 houses inhabited by Turks.
