= Sapanözü, Hassa =

Village in Hatay Province, Turkey

Sapanözü
- Neighbourhood
- Location in Turkey
- Coordinates: 36°51′29″N 36°34′57″E
- Country: Turkey
- Province: Hatay
- District: Hassa
- Population (2022): 489
- Time zone: UTC+3 (TRT)

Sapanözü is a neighbourhood in the municipality and district of Hassa, Hatay Province, Turkey. The village had a population of 489 in 2022.
