= Karbeyaz =

Karbeyaz Yiğityolu
- Neighbourhood
- Location in Turkey
- Coordinates: 35°59′53″N 36°15′58″E
- Country: Turkey
- Province: Hatay
- District: Altınözü
- Elevation: 670 m (2,200 ft)
- Population (2022): 1,128
- Time zone: UTC+3 (TRT)
- Postal code: 31750
- Area code: 0326

Karbeyaz (formerly: Yiğityolu) is a neighbourhood of the municipality and district of Altınözü, Hatay Province, Turkey. Its population is 1,128 (2022). Before the 2013 reorganisation, it was a town (belde).

Karbeyaz is situated close to the Syrian border. The distance to Altınözü is 19 kilometres (12 mi) and to Antakya (central city of the province) is 45 kilometres (28 mi). The town was founded by the soldiers in the army of Ottoman sultan Selim I during his return from the Egyptian campaign in 1517. After the First World War like the rest of the province it was offered to France. During the French rule its name was changed to Yiğityolu. But after it merged to Turkey in 1939, the former name Karbeyaz was readopted. ın 1975 Karbeyaz was declared a seat of township. The town is a typical agricultural town with olives being the most important crop. Cereal and figs are also produced.
