= Yukarıkarafakılı, Hassa =

Village in Hatay Province, Turkey

Yukarıkarafakılı
- Neighbourhood
- Location in Turkey
- Coordinates: 36°47′53″N 36°27′52″E
- Country: Turkey
- Province: Hatay
- District: Hassa
- Population (2022): 726
- Time zone: UTC+3 (TRT)

Yukarıkarafakılı is a neighbourhood in the municipality and district of Hassa, Hatay Province, Turkey. The village had a population of 726 in 2022.

In late 19th century, German orientalist Martin Hartmann listed the village as a settlement of 70 houses inhabited by Turks.
