= Hamam, Kumlu =

Village in Hatay Province, Turkey

Hamam Hemame
- Neighbourhood
- Location in Turkey
- Coordinates: 36°23′42″N 36°32′35″E
- Country: Turkey
- Province: Hatay
- District: Kumlu

Government
  - Muhtar: Enis Mert Çeken
- Population (2022): 272
- Time zone: UTC+3 (TRT)

Hamam (also spelled Hammam or Hemame) is a neighbourhood of the municipality and district of Kumlu, Hatay Province, Turkey. Its population is 272 (2022).
