= Sugediği, Hassa =

Village in Hatay Province, Turkey

Sugediği
- Neighbourhood
- Location in Turkey
- Coordinates: 36°44′54″N 36°35′27″E
- Country: Turkey
- Province: Hatay
- District: Hassa
- Population (2022): 110
- Time zone: UTC+3 (TRT)

Sugediği is a neighbourhood in the municipality and district of Hassa, Hatay Province, Turkey. The village had a population of 110 in 2022.
