= Koruhüyük, Hassa =

Village in Hatay Province, Turkey

Koruhüyük
- Neighbourhood
- Location in Turkey
- Coordinates: 36°49′40″N 36°34′33″E
- Country: Turkey
- Province: Hatay
- District: Hassa
- Population (2022): 218
- Time zone: UTC+3 (TRT)

Koruhüyük is a neighbourhood in the municipality and district of Hassa, Hatay Province, Turkey. The village is populated by Kurds and had a population of 218 in 2022.
