= Yukarıbucak, Hassa =

Village in Hatay Province, Turkey

Yukarıbucak
- Neighbourhood
- Location in Turkey
- Coordinates: 36°44′39″N 36°27′7″E
- Country: Turkey
- Province: Hatay
- District: Hassa
- Population (2022): 451
- Time zone: UTC+3 (TRT)

Yukarıbucak is a neighbourhood in the municipality and district of Hassa, Hatay Province, Turkey. The village had a population of 451 in 2022.
