= Bademli, Hassa =

Village in Hatay Province, Turkey

Bademli
- Neighbourhood
- Location in Turkey
- Coordinates: 36°45′31″N 36°26′55″E
- Country: Turkey
- Province: Hatay
- District: Hassa
- Population (2022): 698
- Time zone: UTC+3 (TRT)

Bademli, historically Kızıllar, is a neighbourhood in the municipality and district of Hassa, Hatay Province, Turkey. The village had a population of 698 in 2022.

In late 19th century, German orientalist Martin Hartmann listed the village as a settlement inhabited by Turks.
