= Demrek, Hassa =

Village in Hatay Province, Turkey

Demrek
- Neighbourhood
- Location in Turkey
- Coordinates: 36°40′22″N 36°26′37″E
- Country: Turkey
- Province: Hatay
- District: Hassa
- Population (2022): 1,260
- Time zone: UTC+3 (TRT)

Demrek is a neighbourhood in the municipality and district of Hassa, Hatay Province, Turkey. The village had a population of 1,260 in 2022.

In late 19th century, German orientalist Martin Hartmann listed the village as a settlement inhabited by Turks and 1 household of Armenian Catholics.
