= Gazeluşağı, Hassa =

Village in Hatay Province, Turkey

Gazeluşağı
- Neighbourhood
- Location in Turkey
- Coordinates: 36°51′36″N 36°29′29″E
- Country: Turkey
- Province: Hatay
- District: Hassa
- Population (2022): 205
- Time zone: UTC+3 (TRT)

Gazeluşağı is a neighbourhood in the municipality and district of Hassa, Hatay Province, Turkey. The village had a population of 205 in 2022.

In the late 19th century, German orientalist Martin Hartmann listed the village as a settlement of 25 houses inhabited by Turks.
