= Arpalıuşağı, Hassa =

Village in Hatay Province, Turkey

Arpalıuşağı
- Neighbourhood
- Location in Turkey
- Coordinates: 36°46′14″N 36°26′58″E
- Country: Turkey
- Province: Hatay
- District: Hassa
- Population (2022): 634
- Time zone: UTC+3 (TRT)

Arpalıuşağı, historically Arapuşağı, is a neighbourhood in the municipality and district of Hassa, Hatay Province, Turkey. The village had a population of 634 in 2022.

In the late 19th century, German orientalist Martin Hartmann listed the village as a settlement of six houses inhabited by Turks.
