= Güvenç, Hassa =

Village in Hatay Province, Turkey

Güvenç
- Neighbourhood
- Location in Turkey
- Coordinates: 36°41′5″N 36°25′20″E
- Country: Turkey
- Province: Hatay
- District: Hassa
- Population (2022): 946
- Time zone: UTC+3 (TRT)

Güvenç is a neighbourhood in the municipality and district of Hassa, Hatay Province, Turkey. The village had a population of 946 in 2022.
