= Akkülek, Hassa =

Village in Hatay Province, Turkey

Akkülek
- Neighbourhood
- Location in Turkey
- Coordinates: 36°39′5″N 36°30′5″E
- Country: Turkey
- Province: Hatay
- District: Hassa
- Population (2022): 327
- Time zone: UTC+3 (TRT)

Akkülek is a neighbourhood in the municipality and district of Hassa, Hatay Province, Turkey. The village had a population of 327 in 2022.
