= Çınarbaşı, Hassa =

Village in Hatay Province, Turkey

Çınarbaşı
- Neighbourhood
- Location in Turkey
- Coordinates: 36°50′9″N 36°35′43″E
- Country: Turkey
- Province: Hatay
- District: Hassa
- Population (2022): 498
- Time zone: UTC+3 (TRT)

Çınarbaşı is a neighbourhood in the municipality and district of Hassa, Hatay Province, Turkey. The village is populated by Kurds and had a population of 498 in 2022.
