= Aktaş, Kumlu =

Aktaş
- Neighbourhood
- Location within Turkey
- Coordinates: 36°22′N 36°20′E
- Country: Turkey
- Province: Hatay
- District: Kumlu
- Elevation: 81 m (266 ft)
- Population (2022): 1,452
- Time zone: UTC+3 (TRT)

Aktaş is a neighbourhood of the municipality and district of Kumlu, Hatay Province, Turkey. Its population is 1,452 (2022). The village is at the west of Kumlu.
