= Tiyek, Hassa =

Village in Hatay Province, Turkey

Tiyek
- Neighbourhood
- Location in Turkey
- Coordinates: 36.807°N 36.483°E
- Country: Turkey
- Province: Hatay
- District: Hassa
- Population (2022): 357
- Time zone: UTC+3 (TRT)

Tiyek is a neighbourhood in the municipality and district of Hassa, Hatay Province, Turkey. The village had a population of 357 in 2022.
