= Zeytinoba, Hassa =

Village in Hatay Province, Turkey

Zeytinoba
- Neighbourhood
- Location in Turkey
- Coordinates: 36°43′0″N 36°26′26″E
- Country: Turkey
- Province: Hatay
- District: Hassa
- Population (2022): 511
- Time zone: UTC+3 (TRT)

Zeytinoba is a neighbourhood in the municipality and district of Hassa, Hatay Province, Turkey. The village had a population of 511 in 2022.
