= Bintaş, Hassa =

Village in Hatay Province, Turkey

Bintaş
- Neighbourhood
- Location in Turkey
- Coordinates: 36°47′34″N 36°33′38″E
- Country: Turkey
- Province: Hatay
- District: Hassa
- Population (2022): 299
- Time zone: UTC+3 (TRT)

Bintaş, historically Adamanlı, is a neighbourhood in the municipality and district of Hassa, Hatay Province, Turkey. The village is populated by Kurds and had a population of 299 in 2022.

== History ==
In late 19th century, German orientalist Martin Hartmann listed the village as a settlement of 15 houses inhabited by Kurds.
