= Serinyol =

- Neighbourhood
- Location in Turkey
- Coordinates: 36°22′N 36°12′E
- Country: Turkey
- Province: Hatay
- District: Antakya
- Elevation: 120 m (390 ft)
- Population (2022): 15,804
- Time zone: UTC+3 (TRT)
- Postal code: 31060
- Area code: 0326

Serinyol is a neighbourhood of the municipality and district of Antakya, Hatay Province, Turkey. Its population is 15,804 (2022). Before the 2013 reorganisation, it was a town (belde).

== Geography ==
Serinyol is situated to the east of Nur Mountains which lie between the Mediterranean Sea and Amik Valley on Turkish state highway D.825. It is 18 kilometres (11 mi) north of Antakya. Mustafa Kemal University, the state university of Hatay Province is situated 3 kilometres (1.9 mi) south of Serinyol.

== History ==
The settlement was founded in the 19th century by Circassian refugees from Russia. Between 1920 and 1938 it was a part of Mandatory Syria. On 7 September it became a part of "Hatay Republic" and on 7 July 1939 Hatay Republic was annexed to Turkey.

== Economy ==
Olive, cotton, citrus and vegetables consist the agricultural wealth of Serinyol. There are also some light agriculture based industries in Serinyol.
