= Ziyaret, Altınözü =

Ziyaret
- Neighbourhood
- Location within Turkey
- Coordinates: 36°9′37″N 36°21′5″E
- Country: Turkey
- Province: Hatay
- District: Altınözü
- Population (2022): 928
- Time zone: UTC+3 (TRT)

Ziyaret is a neighbourhood of the municipality and district of Altınözü, Hatay Province, Turkey. Its population was 928 in 2022.
