= Koçören, Defne =

Koçören
- Neighbourhood
- Location in Turkey
- Coordinates: 36°10′47″N 36°05′45″E
- Country: Turkey
- Province: Hatay
- District: Defne
- Population (2022): 2,013
- Time zone: UTC+3 (TRT)
- Postal code: 31160
- Area code: 0326

Koçören is a neighbourhood of the municipality and district of Defne, Hatay Province, Turkey. Its population is 2,013 (2022).
