= Aşağıkarafakılı, Hassa =

Village in Hatay Province, Turkey

Aşağıkarafakılı
- Neighbourhood
- Location in Turkey
- Coordinates: 36°46′44″N 36°33′28″E
- Country: Turkey
- Province: Hatay
- District: Hassa
- Population (2022): 627
- Time zone: UTC+3 (TRT)

Aşağıkarafakılı is a neighbourhood in the municipality and district of Hassa, Hatay Province, Turkey. The village is populated by Kurds and had a population of 627 in 2022.
