= Dedemli, Hassa =

Village in Hatay Province, Turkey

Dedemli
- Neighbourhood
- Location in Turkey
- Coordinates: 36°48′39″N 36°28′36″E
- Country: Turkey
- Province: Hatay
- District: Hassa
- Population (2022): 425
- Time zone: UTC+3 (TRT)

Dedemli is a neighbourhood in the municipality and district of Hassa, Hatay Province, Turkey. The village had a population of 425 in 2022.

In late 19th century, German orientalist Martin Hartmann listed the village as a settlement of 15 houses inhabited by Turks.
