= Haydarlar, Hassa =

Village in Hatay Province, Turkey

Haydarlar
- Neighbourhood
- Location in Turkey
- Coordinates: 36°44′34″N 36°32′27″E
- Country: Turkey
- Province: Hatay
- District: Hassa
- Population (2022): 427
- Time zone: UTC+3 (TRT)

Haydarlar is a neighbourhood in the municipality and district of Hassa, Hatay Province, Turkey. The village had a population of 427 in 2022.
