= Eğribucak, Hassa =

Village in Hatay Province, Turkey

Eğribucak
- Neighbourhood
- Location in Turkey
- Coordinates: 36°44′40″N 36°27′38″E
- Country: Turkey
- Province: Hatay
- District: Hassa
- Population (2022): 669
- Time zone: UTC+3 (TRT)

Eğribucak is a neighbourhood in the municipality and district of Hassa, Hatay Province, Turkey. The village had a population of 669 in 2022.

In late 19th century, German orientalist Martin Hartmann listed the village as a settlement of 38 houses of Turks and 12 houses of Armenians (including Armenian Catholics).
