= Çetenli, Altınözü =

Çetenli
- Neighbourhood
- Location in Turkey
- Coordinates: 36.1125°N 36.2970°E
- Country: Turkey
- Province: Hatay
- District: Altınözü
- Population (2022): 2,134
- Time zone: UTC+3 (TRT)

Çetenli is a neighbourhood of the municipality and district of Altınözü, Hatay Province, Turkey. Its population is 2,134 (2022). It is 5 km east of Altınözü town centre and 7 km from the Syrian border.
