= Çekmece =

- Neighbourhood
- Location within Turkey
- Coordinates: 36.203°N 36.129°E
- Country: Turkey
- Province: Hatay
- District: Defne
- Population (2022): 40,226
- Time zone: UTC+3 (TRT)
- Area code: 0326

Çekmece is a neighbourhood of the municipality and district of Defne, Hatay Province, Turkey. Its population is 40,226 (2022). Before the 2013 reorganisation, it was a town (belde). Also in 2013, it passed from the former central district of Hatay to the new district of Defne. It is within the metropolitan area of Antakya.

The neighborhood is populated by Alawites
