= Gülkent, Hassa =

Village in Hatay Province, Turkey

Gülkent
- Neighbourhood
- Location in Turkey
- Coordinates: 36°43′7″N 36°30′26″E
- Country: Turkey
- Province: Hatay
- District: Hassa
- Population (2022): 903
- Time zone: UTC+3 (TRT)

Gülkent is a neighbourhood in the municipality and district of Hassa, Hatay Province, Turkey. The village had a population of 903 in 2022.
