= Hacılar, Hassa =

Village in Hatay Province, Turkey

Hacılar
- Neighbourhood
- Location in Turkey
- Coordinates: 36°45′19″N 36°29′2″E
- Country: Turkey
- Province: Hatay
- District: Hassa
- Population (2022): 495
- Time zone: UTC+3 (TRT)

Hacılar is a neighbourhood in the municipality and district of Hassa, Hatay Province, Turkey. The village had a population of 495 in 2022.

In late 19th century, German orientalist Martin Hartmann listed the village as a settlement of 8 houses inhabited by Turks, 2 houses by Armenians, and 4 houses by Turkish-speaking Greeks.
