= Gülpınar, Hassa =

Village in Hatay Province, Turkey

Gülpınar
- Neighbourhood
- Location in Turkey
- Coordinates: 36°45′20″N 36°27′55″E
- Country: Turkey
- Province: Hatay
- District: Hassa
- Population (2022): 346
- Time zone: UTC+3 (TRT)

Gülpınar is a neighbourhood in the municipality and district of Hassa, Hatay Province, Turkey. The village had a population of 346 in 2022.

In late 19th century, German orientalist Martin Hartmann listed the village as a settlement of 14 to 17 houses inhabited by Turks and 1 house by Greeks.
