= Mazmanlı, Hassa =

Village in Hatay Province, Turkey

Mazmanlı
- Neighbourhood
- Location in Turkey
- Coordinates: 36°39′51″N 36°31′27″E
- Country: Turkey
- Province: Hatay
- District: Hassa
- Population (2022): 1,529
- Time zone: UTC+3 (TRT)

Mazmanlı is a neighbourhood in the municipality and district of Hassa, Hatay Province, Turkey. The village is populated by Kurds and had a population of 1,529 in 2022.
