= Akpınar, Kumlu =

Akpınar
- Neighbourhood
- Location in Turkey
- Coordinates: 36°26′N 36°32′E
- Country: Turkey
- Province: Hatay
- District: Kumlu
- Elevation: 121 m (397 ft)
- Population (2022): 1,220
- Time zone: UTC+3 (TRT)

Akpınar is a neighbourhood of the municipality and district of Kumlu, Hatay Province, Turkey. Its population is 1,220 (2022). The village is at the north of Kumlu and 2 kilometres (1 mi) west of the Syrian border.
