= Küreci, Hassa =

Village in Hatay Province, Turkey

Küreci
- Neighbourhood
- Location in Turkey
- Coordinates: 36°42′50″N 36°27′33″E
- Country: Turkey
- Province: Hatay
- District: Hassa
- Population (2022): 3,199
- Time zone: UTC+3 (TRT)

Küreci is a neighbourhood of the municipality and district of Hassa, Hatay Province, Turkey. The village had a population of 3,199 in 2022. Before the 2013 reorganisation, it was a town (belde).

In late 19th century, German orientalist Martin Hartmann listed the village as a settlement inhabited by Turks and 3 to 4 households of Armenians.
