= Karsu, Altınözü =

Karsu
- Neighbourhood
- Location in Turkey
- Coordinates: 36°8′3″N 36°16′25″E
- Country: Turkey
- Province: Hatay
- District: Altınözü
- Population (2022): 1,847
- Time zone: UTC+3 (TRT)

Karsu is a neighbourhood of the municipality and district of Altınözü, Hatay Province, Turkey. Its population is 1,847 (2022). The neighbourhood has a Mediterranean climate.

== Economy ==
The neighbourhood economy of the area is agricultural and livestock.

== Infrastructure ==
The road leading to the neighborhood is asphalt and there is an electricity supply, fixed telephone lines and a drinking water network. There are village schools.

== Notable people ==
- Karsu Dönmez, a singer, pianist and composer born in Amsterdam, was named after the village by her parents, who came from the village.
