= Karayılan, Hatay =

Karayılan
- Neighbourhood
- Location in Turkey
- Coordinates: 36°43′N 36°14′E
- Country: Turkey
- Province: Hatay
- District: İskenderun
- Elevation: 25 m (82 ft)
- Population (2022): 9,074
- Time zone: UTC+3 (TRT)
- Postal code: 31280
- Area code: 0326

Karayılan (literally "black snake") is a neighbourhood of the municipality and district of İskenderun, Hatay Province, Turkey. Its population is 9,074 (2022). Before the 2013 reorganisation, it was a town (belde).

== Geography ==
Karayılan is situated to the east of Turkish state highway D.817 and Çukurova Motorway. Distance to İskenderun is 16 kilometres (9.9 mi) and to Antakya (administrative center of Hatay Province) is 93 kilometres (58 mi).

== History ==
The name of the town refers to a 17th-century Turkmen family. In 1691 the Ottoman government tried to settle the nomads. The nomads struggled to continue their traditional lifestyle. Although the government punished them by exiling to Rakka Eyalet (now in Syria) they were able to return. But at the end of continuous struggles, towards the end of the 18th century, three families gave up and agreed to settle where they were assigned to. It was designated as a town on November 29, 1989. In 1990, Karayılan was declared a seat of township.

== Economy ==
Cereals and citrus are among the major crops. Many residents work in Isdemir (steel works)
