= Denizciler =

- Neighbourhood
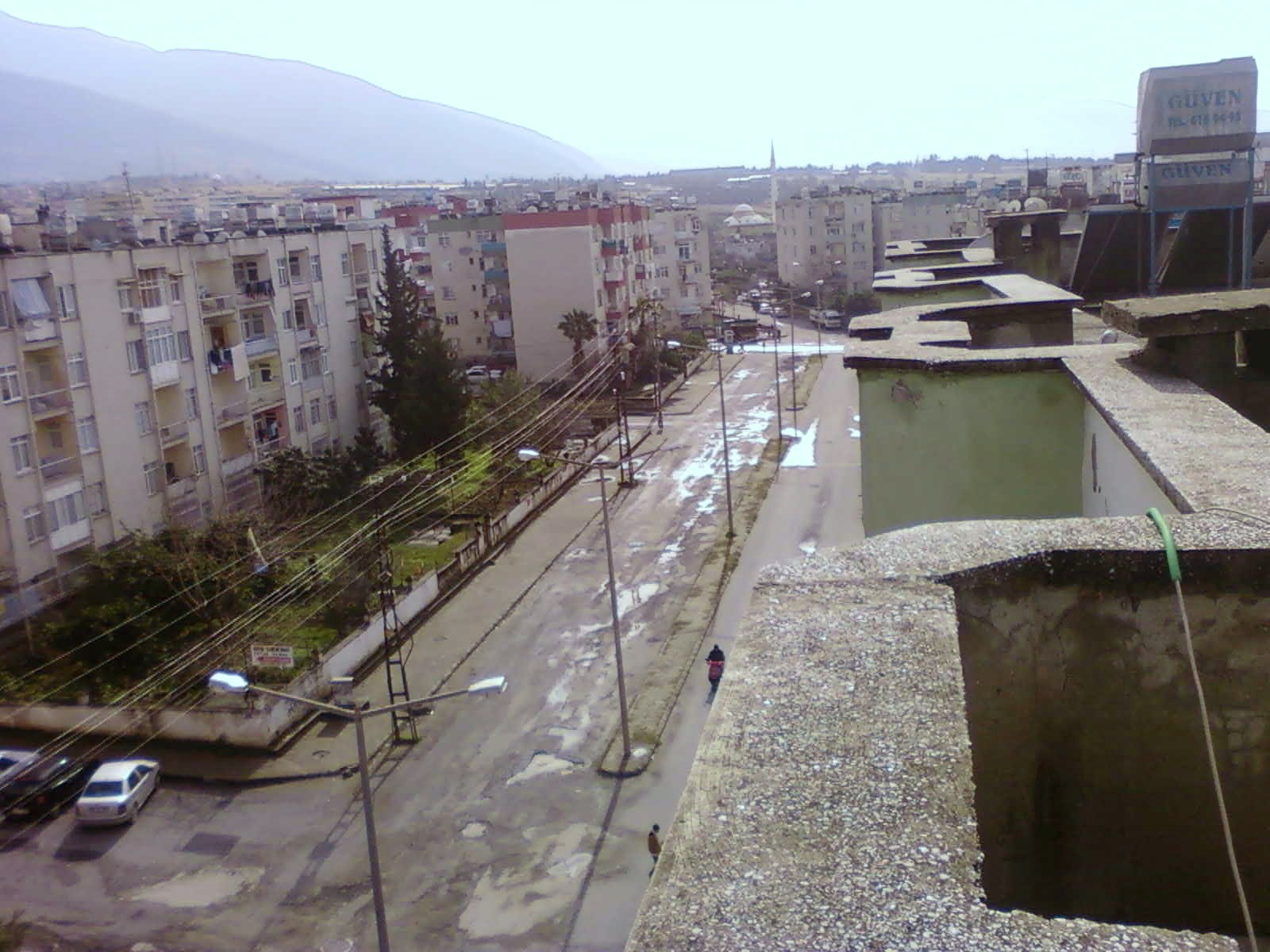

- Location within Turkey
- Coordinates: 36°39′N 36°13′E
- Country: Turkey
- Province: Hatay
- District: İskenderun
- Elevation: 60 m (200 ft)
- Population (2022): 25,270
- Time zone: UTC+3 (TRT)
- Postal code: 31280
- Area code: 0326

Denizciler (literally "Seamen") is a neighbourhood of the municipality and district of İskenderun, Hatay Province, Turkey. Its population is 25,270 (2022). Before the 2013 reorganisation, it was a town (belde). It is a coastal town situated on the east coast line of the Mediterranean Sea. It is on Turkish state highway D.817 which connects İskenderun to north. The distance to İskenderun is 9 kilometres (5.6 mi) and to Antakya (province center) is 65 kilometres (40 mi).

Denizciler is a recent town. It was formed by merging several settlements in 1987. There are several civil and military offices and small ports in and around Denizciler, the most important one being Isdemir a major steel producer situated to the north of Denziciler. Thus services in and around the town constitute the main revenue of the town. Denizciler is also popular with retired people.
