= Kuzuculu =

Kuzuculu Kuzulu
- Neighbourhood
- Location in Turkey
- Coordinates: 36°53′N 36°14′E
- Country: Turkey
- Province: Hatay
- District: Dörtyol
- Elevation: 105 m (344 ft)
- Population (2022): 11,171
- Time zone: UTC+3 (TRT)
- Postal code: 31600
- Area code: 0326

Kuzuculu is a neighbourhood of the municipality and district of Dörtyol, Hatay Province, Turkey. Its population is 11,171 (2022). Before the 2013 reorganisation, it was a town (belde). It is almost merged to Dörtyol to the south.

The town was founded about five centuries ago by an Ottoman pasha named Emir Ali who built a watermill on the creek just south of the settlement. The first settlers were from Central Anatolia. They owned sheep herds and used this settlement as a kışlak (winter quarters for the herd). The name of the town refers to these early settlers, as Kuzucu means lamb owner. Kuzuculu was declared a seat of township in 1957.
