= Tomruksuyu =

Tomruksuyu Karamanlı
- Neighbourhood
- Location in Turkey
- Coordinates: 36°09′N 36°03′E
- Country: Turkey
- Province: Hatay
- District: Samandağ
- Elevation: 130 m (430 ft)
- Population (2022): 3,722
- Time zone: UTC+3 (TRT)
- Postal code: 31800
- Area code: 0326

Tomruksuyu is a neighbourhood of the municipality and district of Samandağ, Hatay Province, Turkey. Its population is 3,722 (2022). Before the 2013 reorganisation, it was a town (belde). It is to the north of the highway connecting Samandağ to Antakya (the capital of the province). The distance to Samandağ is 12 kilometres (7.5 mi) and to Antakya is 15 kilometres (9.3 mi).

The settlement was founded in 1807 during the Ottoman Empire era, after an earthquake. Between 1918 and 1938, like most other settlements in Liwa Iskenderun it was under French rule and a part of Syria. The original name was Karamanlı. But after 1960, it was renamed Tomruksuyu. In 1999 it was declared a seat of township. Vegetables and olive are the two important crop of Tomruksuyu.
