= Sutaşı =

Sutaşı Sabunlu Mutayran
- Neighbourhood
- Location in Turkey
- Coordinates: 36°05′N 36°01′E
- Country: Turkey
- Province: Hatay
- District: Samandağ
- Elevation: 20 m (66 ft)
- Population (2022): 6,402
- Time zone: UTC+3 (TRT)
- Postal code: 31800
- Area code: 0326

Sutaşı is a neighbourhood of the municipality and district of Samandağ, Hatay Province, Turkey. Its population is 6,402 (2022). Before the 2013 reorganisation, it was a town (belde).

== Geography ==
Sutaşı is situated along the Asi River (known as Orontes in antiquity). It is subject to frequent floods and in 1977 it was renamed as Sutaşı ("water stone") referring to floods. It almost merges with Samandağ to the west. Its distance to Antakya (the capital city of the province) is 24 kilometres (15 mi).

== History ==
The settlement was annexed by the Ottoman sultan Selim I in 1517 and was lost to France at the end of World War I in 1918. In 1938, together with the rest of Hatay Republic, it was returned to Turkey. In 1955 it was declared a seat of township.

== Economy ==
The main economic activities in the town are greenhouse and citrus agriculture as well as cattle breeding. Some people are also involved in sericulture.
