= Söğüt, Hassa =

Village in Hatay Province, Turkey

Söğüt
- Neighbourhood
- Location in Turkey
- Coordinates: 36°46′52″N 36°28′3″E
- Country: Turkey
- Province: Hatay
- District: Hassa
- Population (2022): 1,379
- Time zone: UTC+3 (TRT)

Söğüt is a neighbourhood of the municipality and district of Hassa, Hatay Province, Turkey. It had a population of 1,379 in 2022. Before the 2013 reorganisation, it was a town (belde).

In late 19th century, German orientalist Martin Hartmann listed the village as a settlement of 30 houses inhabited by Turks.
