= Arsuz =

Settlement in Turkey

- District and municipality
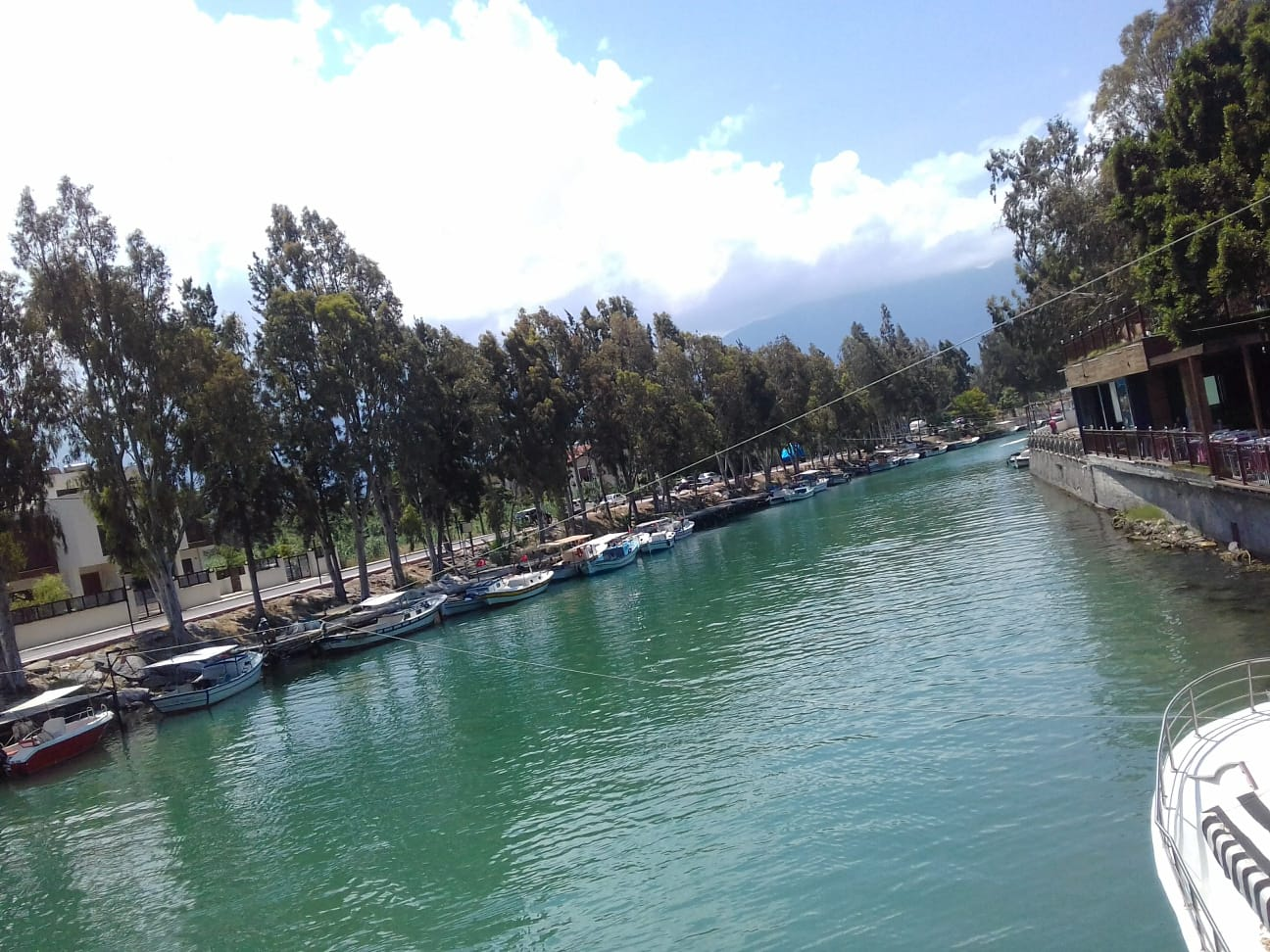

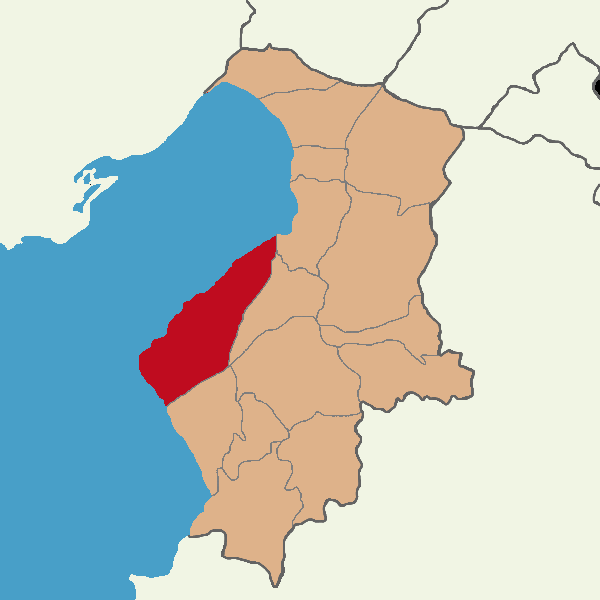
- Map showing Arsuz District in Hatay Province

- Location within Turkey
- Coordinates: 36°24′46″N 35°53′12″E
- Country: Turkey
- Province: Hatay

Government
  - Mayor: Sami Üstün (CHP)
- Area: 462 km^{2} (178 sq mi)
- Elevation: 25 m (82 ft)
- Population (2022): 101,233
  - Density: 219/km^{2} (568/sq mi)
- Time zone: UTC+3 (TRT)
- Area code: 0326
- Website: www.arsuz.bel.tr

Arsuz (Arabic: أرسوز; Greek: Αρσούς) is a municipality and district of Hatay Province, Turkey. Its area is 462 km^{2}, and its population is 101,233 (2022). It covers the southwestern part of the agglomeration of İskenderun and the adjacent countryside and coast. In ancient times, it was known as Rhosus (Ancient Greek: Ῥωσός) and was a former bishopric and titular see.

== Geography ==
The town center of Arsuz is located 40 kilometres (25 mi) South of İskenderun and 118 kilometres (73 mi) from Antakya (administrative center of Hatay Province). While the town center is relatively small near the end of a coastal road leading south from İskenderun, the entire coastal region between İskenderun and the town center is often simply referred as Arsuz. This area is predominantly small rural farms (generally located inland towards the mountains) and small groups of summer homes (generally located near the coastline).

== History ==
Arsuz had many names throughout history, including: Rhosus, Rhossos, Rhossus, Rhopolis, Port Panel/Bonnel, Kabev and Arsous. The earliest documents about it date from the Seleucid Empire, of which Antioch became the capital. Malalas writes that the city was founded by Cilix, son of Agenor. Harpalus set up a bronze statue of Glycera at Rhosus. Demetrius I of Macedon moved the statue of the goddess Tyche from Antigoneia to Rhosus.

Arsuz was then an important seaport on the Gulf of Issus. In 64 BC, it was annexed by the Roman Empire. Under the name Rhosus, it was a city and bishopric (see below) in the late Roman province of Cilicia Secunda, with Anazarbus as its capital. It is mentioned by Strabo, Ptolemy, Pliny the Elder and Stephanus of Byzantium; and later by Hierocles and George of Cyprus.

Some Christians in Rhosus accepted as truth the Docetic Gospel of Peter and for them in around AD 200 Serapion of Antioch composed a treatise condemning the book. Theodoret relates the history of the hermit Theodosius of Antioch, founder of a monastery in the mountain near Rhosus, who was forced by the inroads of barbarians to retire to Antioch, where he died and was succeeded by his disciple Romanus, a native of Rhosus; these two religious are honoured by the Greek Orthodox Church on 5 and 9 February.

In 638 the city was incorporated into the Rashidun Caliphate. In 969 it was taken by the Byzantine Empire, in 1084 by the Seljuk Turks, in 1039 by the Crusades, in 1296 by the Egyptian Mamluks and in 1517 by the Ottoman Turks.

Between 1918 and 1938 the town was under French Mandate for Syria and the Lebanon with the rest of Iskenderun district. In 1938, it became part of the independent Hatay Republic, but in June 1939 the Hatay legislature voted to join Turkey. The district Arsuz was created in 2013 from part of the district of İskenderun.

== Composition ==
There are 38 neighbourhoods in Arsuz District:

- Akçalı
- Arpaçiftlik
- Arpaderesi
- Arpagedik
- Aşağı Kepirce
- Avcılarsuyu
- Beyköyü
- Çetillik
- Derekuyu
- Gökmeydan
- Gözcüler
- Gülcihan
- Hacıahmetli
- Harlısu
- Haymaseki
- Helvalı
- Hüyük
- Işıklı
- Kale
- Karaağaç Cumhuriyet
- Karaağaç Konarlı
- Karaağaç Övündük
- Karaağaç Şarkkonak
- Karagöz
- Karahüseyinli
- Kışla
- Konacık
- Kozaklı
- Kurtbağı
- Madenli
- Nardüzü
- Nergizlik
- Pirinçlik
- Tatarlı
- Tülek
- Üçgüllük
- Uluçınar
- Yukarıkepirce

== Demographics ==
German traveler Martin Hartmann listed 31 settlements in the Ottoman nahiyah of Arsuz, 10 being Alawite (381 houses), 8 being Turkish (205 houses), and 12 without any information. The town of Arsuz (70 houses) was almost wholly Greek Christian with the exception of three Arab and one Turkish families.

== Ecclesiastical history ==
Rhosus was a diocese in the sway of the Patriarchate of Antioch, originally as a suffragan of its Metropolitan in provincial capital of Cilicia Secunda, the Archdiocese of Anazarba, as mentioned in the Notitiae Episcopatuum in the 6th century and one dating from about 840. In another of the 10th century Rhosus is included among the 'exempt' sees, directly subject to the Patriarch.

Six residential Suffragan bishops of Rhosus are known:

- Antipatros, at the Council of Antioch in 363
- Porphyrius, mentioned in a letter by Saint John Chrysostom circa 404
- Julian, at the Council of Chalcedon, 451
- a little later a bishop (name unknown), who separated from his Metropolitan to approve of the reconciliation effected between John of Antioch and Saint Cyril of Alexandria
- Antoninus, at a council of Mopsuestia on the Three-Chapter Controversy in 550;
- Theodore, about 600, mentioned by monk-hagiographer John Moschus.

=== Titular see ===
No later than the 15th century the diocese was nominally restored as Latin titular bishopric of Rhosus (Latin) / Rosea (until 1925) / Roso (Curiate Italian) / Rhosien(sis) (Latin adjective)

It is vacant since decades, having had the following incumbents, so far of the fitting Episcopal (lowest) rank:

- Egidio von Byderborch, Carmelite Order (O. Carm.) (1428.11.29 – ?) as Auxiliary Bishop of Diocese of Strasbourg (France) (1428.11.29 – ?)
- Jean de Montmartin, Friars Minor (O.F.M.) (1434.09.01 – death 1436?), no actual prelature
- Heinrich Hopfgarten (1455.11.21 – 1460.03.24) as Auxiliary Bishop of Archdiocese of Mainz (Germany) (1455.11.21 – 1460.03.24); later Bishop of Risano (1455.11.21 – 1460.03.24)
- Daniel [no last name?!], Augustinian Order (O.E.S.A.) (1470.12.10 – death 1487?), no actual prelature
- Raphael de Mercatellis, appointed titular bishop of Rhosus in 1487, died 1507.
- Adrien Aernoult, O. Carm. (1517.09.18 – 1536.11) as Auxiliary Bishop of Diocese of Cambrai (France) (1517.09.18 – 1536.11)
- Miguel de Sanguesa, Cistercian Order (O. Cist.) (1537.04.20 – 1548) as Auxiliary Bishop of Tarazona (Spain) (1537.04.20 – 1548); later Bishop of Risano (1537.04.29 – death 1548)
- Johann Michael Wenzel von Spaur (1722.04.20 – death 1743.03.28) as Auxiliary Bishop of Diocese of Trento (Italy) (1722.04.20 – 1743.03.28)
- Mihály Mánuel Olsavszky, Basilian Order of Saint Josaphat (O.S.B.M.) (1743.09.05 – death 1767.11.05) as Apostolic Vicar of Mukacheve of the Ruthenians (Ukraine) ([1743.03.12] 1743.09.06 – 1767.11.05)
- Claude-François-Ignace Franchet de Rans (1756.04.05 – death 1810.02.21) as Auxiliary Bishop of Archdiocese of Besançon (France) (1756.04.05 – 1810.02.21)
- János Bradács, O.S.B.M. (1768.01.27 – 1771.09.19) as last Vicar Apostolic of Mukacheve of the Ruthenians (Ukraine) (1768.01.27 – 1771.09.19), next promoted as first Bishop of Mukacheve of the Ruthenians (1771.09.19 – death 1772.07.04)
- Francisco Ramón Valentín de Casaus y Torres, Dominican Order (O.P.) (1807.03.23 – 1815.03.15) as Auxiliary Bishop of Diocese of Antequera (Mexico) (1807.03.23 – 1815.03.15); later Metropolitan Archbishop of Guatemala (Guatemala) (1815.03.15 – 1845.11.10) and Apostolic Administrator of Diocese of La Habana (Cuba) (1836.02.24 – 1845.11.10)
- Bernard Angus MacEachern (1819.01.12 – 1829.08.11) as Auxiliary Bishop of Archdiocese of Québec (Canada) (1819.01.12 – 1829.08.11), later first Bishop of Charlottetown (Canada) (1829.08.11 – death 1835.04.23)
- François-Auguste-Ferdinand Donnet (1835.04.06 – 1837.05.19) as Coadjutor Bishop of Nancy (France) (1835.04.06 – 1837.05.19); later Metropolitan Archbishop of Bordeaux (France) (1837.05.19 – death 1882.12.22), created Cardinal-Priest of S. Maria in Via (1853.06.27 – 1882.12.22)
- Antonio Burbano, O.E.S.A. (1837.05.19 – death 1839?) as Auxiliary Bishop of Popayán (Colombia) (1837.05.19 – 1839?)
- Joannes Bocheński (1850.05.20 – death 1857.01.25) as Auxiliary Bishop of Lviv of the Ukrainians (Byzantine Rite Metropolitanate, Ukraine) (1850.05.20 – 1857.01.25)
- Pietro Saulini (1876.06.26 – death 1878.02.28) as Bishop of Alatri (Italy) (1878.02.28 – 1887)
- Emmanuel-Marie-Ange de Briey (1880.02.27 – 1884.08.30) as Coadjutor Bishop of Meaux (France) ([1880.02.12] 1880.02.27 – 1884.08.30), next succeeded as Bishop of Meaux (1884.08.30 – death 1909.12.11)
- Gennaro Portanova (1883.08.09 – 1885.02.01) as Coadjutor Bishop of Ischia (Italy) (1883.08.09 – 1885.02.01); later succeeding as Bishop of Ischia (1885.02.01 – 1888.03.16), Metropolitan Archbishop of Reggio Calabria (Italy) (1888.03.16 – 1908.04.25), created Cardinal-Priest of S. Clemente (1899.06.22 – 1908.04.25)
- Félix-Jules-Xavier Jourdan de la Passardière, Oratorians of Philip Neri (C.O.) (1884.10.03 – 1913.03.12) successively as Auxiliary Bishop of Diocese of Grenoble (France) (1884.10.03 – 1885), Auxiliary Bishop of Archdiocese of Lyon (France) (1885 – 1887), Auxiliary Bishop of Archdiocese of Carthage (1887 – 1892), Auxiliary Bishop of Archdiocese of Rouen (France) (1892 – retired 1896) and emeritate
- Trudo Johannes Jans, O.F.M. (1923.12.13 – 1929.09.09) as last Apostolic Vicar of Southwestern Hupeh 湖北南境 (China) (1923.12.13 – 1924.12.03), restyled first Apostolic Vicar of Apostolic Vicar of Yichang 宜昌 (China) (1924.12.03 – death 1929.09.09)
- José Garibi Rivera (1929.12.16 – 1934.12.22) as Auxiliary Bishop of Guadalajara (Mexico) (1929.12.16 – 1934.12.22); later Titular Archbishop of Bizya (1934.12.22 – 1936.02.18) as Coadjutor Archbishop of Guadalajara (Mexico) (1934.12.22 – 1936.02.18), succeeding as Metropolitan Archbishop of Guadalajara (Mexico) (1936.02.18 – retired 1969.03.01), created Cardinal-Priest of S. Onofrio (1958.12.18 – death 1972.05.27), President of Conferencia del Episcopado Mexicano (C.E.M.) (1960 – 1963)
- Heinrich Ritter, Holy Ghost Fathers (C.S.Sp.) (born Germany) (1935.09.06 – 1942.07.19) as first Bishop-Prelate of Territorial Prelature of Jurua (Brazil) (1935.09.06 – 1942.07.19)
- Marc Lacroix, Missionary Oblates of Mary Immaculate (O.M.I.) (1942.12.18 – 1967.07.13) as last Apostolic Vicar of Hudson Bay (Canada) (1942.12.18 – 1967.07.13); next promoted first Bishop of Churchill (Canada) (1967.07.13 – 1968.01.29), restyled first Bishop of Churchill–Hudson Bay (Canada) (1968.01.29 – 1968.10.25), emeritate as Titular Bishop of Chullu (1968.10.25 – 1970.11.24).

== Sources and external links ==
- GCatholic - (former and) titular see
- Pétridès, Sophron (1912). "Rosea" . In Herbermann, Charles (ed.). Catholic Encyclopedia. Vol. 13. New York: Robert Appleton Company.

Bibliography

- Pius Bonifacius Gams, Series episcoporum Ecclesiae Catholicae, Leipzig, 1931, p. 436
- Michel Lequien, Oriens christianus in quatuor Patriarchatus digestus, Paris, 1740, Tomo II, coll. 905-908
- Konrad Eubel, Hierarchia Catholica Medii Aevi, vol. 1, p. 423 (note 4 on 'Rosensis'); vol. 2, pp. 224–225; vol. 3, p. 287; vol. 5, p. 334; vol. 6, p. 357
