= Defne =

District in Turkey

- District and municipality
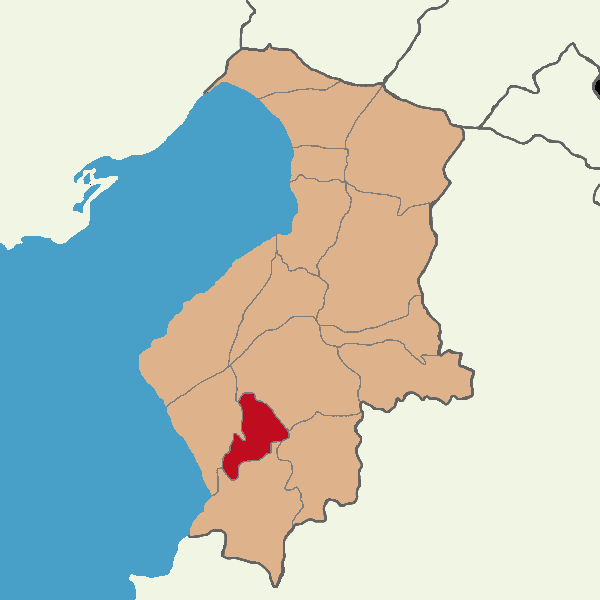
- Map showing Defne District in Hatay Province

- Location within Turkey
- Coordinates: 36°11′18″N 36°8′52″E
- Country: Turkey
- Province: Hatay

Government
  - Mayor: Halil İbrahim Özgün (CHP)
- Area: 155 km^{2} (60 sq mi)
- Population (2025): 139,605
  - Density: 901/km^{2} (2,330/sq mi)
- Time zone: UTC+3 (TRT)
- Postal code: 31160
- Area code: 0326
- Website: www.defne.bel.tr

Defne is a municipality and district of Hatay Province, Turkey. Its area is 155 km^{2}, and its population is 139,605 (2026). The district Defne was created in 2013 from parts of the former central district of Hatay and the district of Samandağ. It covers the southwestern part of the agglomeration of Antakya and the adjacent countryside.

Defne was heavily damaged by powerful earthquakes in February 2023 and subsequent aftershocks.

The municipality of Defne was named after the Greek mythological figure of Daphne. Tourist sites in Defne include the Harbiye Hydro Park and Harbiye Waterfall, as well as the historic site of St Simeon's Monastery.

== Composition ==
There are 37 neighbourhoods in Defne District:

- Akdeniz
- Aknehir
- Armutlu
- Aşağıokçular
- Bahçeköy
- Balıklıdere
- Ballıöz
- Bostancık
- Büyükçat
- Çardaklı
- Çekmece
- Çınarlı
- Çökek
- Değirmenyolu
- Döver
- Dursunlu
- Elektrik
- Gümüşgöze
- Güneysöğüt
- Hancağız
- Harbiye
- Hüseyinli
- Karşıyaka
- Koçören
- Meydancık
- Orhanlı
- Özbek
- Samankaya
- Sinanlı
- Subaşı
- Sümerler
- Tavla
- Toygarlı
- Turunçlu
- Üzengili
- Yeniçağ
- Yeşilpınar

== Twin towns ==
- Ödemiş, Turkey
