= Şenköy =

Settlement in Turkey

Şenköy Şeyhköy
- Neighbourhood
- Location in Turkey
- Coordinates: 36°03′N 36°9′E
- Country: Turkey
- Province: Hatay
- District: Yayladağı
- Elevation: 680 m (2,230 ft)
- Population (2022): 875
- Time zone: UTC+3 (TRT)
- Area code: 0326

Şenköy is a neighbourhood of the municipality and district of Yayladağı, Hatay Province, Turkey. Its population is 875 (2022). Before the 2013 reorganisation, it was a town (belde). Also in 2013, it passed from the former central district of Hatay to the district of Yayladağı.

Şenköy is 23 kilometres (14 mi) south of Antakya (administrative center of Hatay) on the way to Yayladağı. The former name of Şenköy was Şeyhköy (village of sheik) referring to Sheik Ahmet Kuseyri who lived in the 16th century. According to nonconfirmed claims the sheik had been presented to Suleyman I (also known as Suleyman the Magnificent) and was given a zeamet (a kind of fief). The tomb of the sheik is next to the mosque built in the 16th century. After his death in 1549, his tomb became a pilgrimage center.

Between 1918 and 1938 Şenköy was under French Mandate. In 1939 together with the rest of Hatay Republic it merged to Turkey.

The main product of the town is olive. There is also a small soap mill.
