= Ardıçlı, Hassa =

Village in Hatay Province, Turkey

Ardıçlı
- Neighbourhood
- Location in Turkey
- Coordinates: 36°43′47″N 36°31′9″E
- Country: Turkey
- Province: Hatay
- District: Hassa
- Population (2022): 3,860
- Time zone: UTC+3 (TRT)

Ardıçlı is a neighbourhood of the municipality and district of Hassa, Hatay Province, Turkey. It had a population of 3,860 in 2022. Before the 2013 reorganisation, it was a town (belde).
