= Kuşalanı =

Kuşalanı Mutayran
- Neighbourhood
- Location in Turkey
- Coordinates: 36°06′N 36°00′E
- Country: Turkey
- Province: Hatay
- District: Samandağ
- Elevation: 25 m (82 ft)
- Population (2022): 6,139
- Time zone: UTC+3 (TRT)
- Postal code: 31800
- Area code: 0326

Kuşalanı is a neighbourhood of the municipality and district of Samandağ, Hatay Province, Turkey. Its population is 6,139 (2022). Before the 2013 reorganisation, it was a town (belde). It is on the state highway D.420 connecting Samandağ to Antakya (capital of the province). The distance to Samandağ is 3 kilometres (1.9 mi) and to Antakya is 22 kilometres (14 mi).
