= Altınözü =

- District and municipality
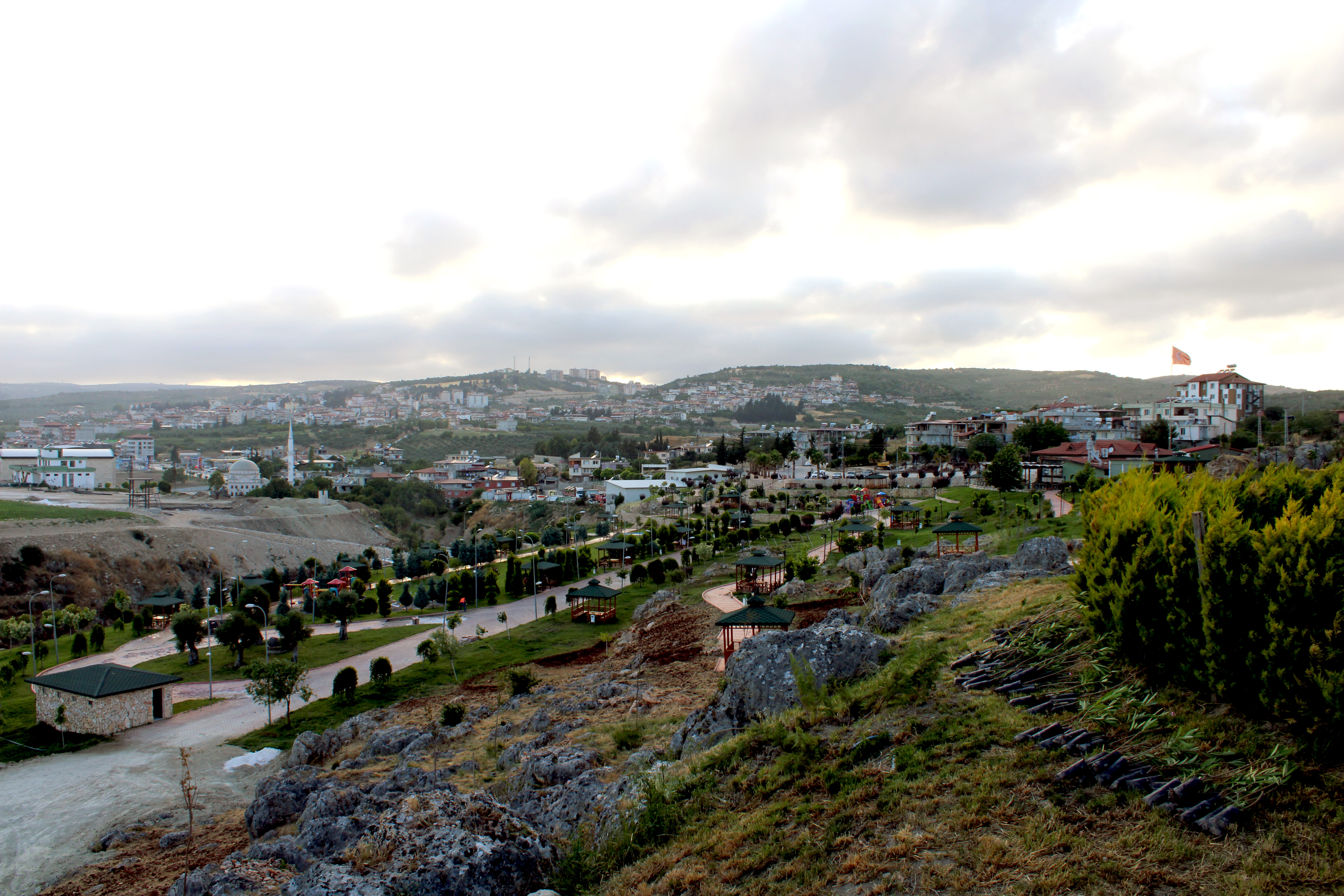

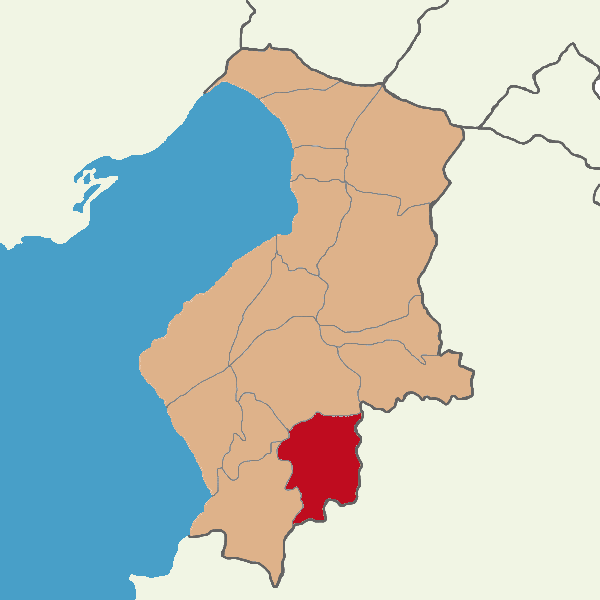
- Map showing Altınözü District in Hatay Province

- Location within Turkey
- Coordinates: 36°06′0″N 36°13′48″E
- Country: Turkey
- Province: Hatay

Government
  - Mayor: Rıfat Sarı (AKP)
- Area: 392 km^{2} (151 sq mi)
- Elevation: 400 m (1,300 ft)
- Population (2022): 60,344
  - Density: 154/km^{2} (399/sq mi)
- Time zone: UTC+3 (TRT)
- Postal code: 31750
- Area code: 0326
- Website: www.altinozu.bel.tr

Altınözü (Arabic: الْقُصَيْر, el-Kusayr) is a municipality and district of Hatay Province, Turkey. Its area is 392 km^{2}, and its population is 60,344 (2022). It is in the south-east of Hatay Province, on the border between Turkey and Syria. The mayor is Rıfat Sarı (AKP).

== History ==
The region which was known as al-Quṣayr, (Note: The name was a derivation from qasr, the Arabic word for palace.) was part of the Principality of Antioch during the Crusader era. In 1180, patriarch Aimery of Limoges fled to the region, after he had excommunicated Bohemond III in Antioch. The latter besieged the region, but nobleman Rainald II Masoir supported the patriarch, until King Baldwin IV sent a delegation to settle the dispute.

Altınözü was heavily damaged by powerful earthquakes in February 2023 and subsequent aftershocks.

== Geography ==
Altınözü stands on the fertile Kuseyr plateau, and several crops such as olives (the largest olive growing area is in this part of Turkey), tobacco, grains and other crops are grown here. The district gets its water from the Yarseli reservoir.

== Composition ==
There are 48 neighbourhoods in Altınözü District:

- Akamber
- Akdarı
- Alakent
- Altınkaya
- Atayurdu
- Avuttepe
- Babatorun
- Boynuyoğun
- Büyükburç
- Çetenli
- Dokuzdal
- Enek
- Erbaşı
- Fatikli
- Gözecik
- Günvuran
- Hacıpaşa
- Hanyolu
- Kamberli
- Kansu
- Karbeyaz
- Karsu
- Kazancık
- Keskincik
- Kılıçtutan
- Kıyıgören
- Kolcular
- Kozkalesi
- Kurtmezraası
- Mayadalı
- Oymaklı
- Sarıbük
- Sarılar
- Seferli
- Sivrikavak
- Sofular
- Tepehan
- Tokaçlı
- Tokdemir
- Toprakhisar
- Türkmenmezraası
- Yanıkpınar
- Yarseli
- Yenihisar
- Yenişehir
- Yolağzı
- Yunushanı
- Ziyaret

== Demographics ==
The district has a population of 60,344 (2022). There is also a refugee camp called the Altinozu Camp that houses 1,350 Syrian Sunnis who have fled the Syrian civil war. The population of the district is mostly Muslim with an Antiochian Greek Orthodox (also known as Rûm Orthodox) Christian community encompassing two churches in the capital of the district and the entirely Christian village of Tokaçlı.

== Sources ==
- Buck, Andrew D. (2017). The Principality of Antioch and Its Frontiers in the Twelfth Century. Boydell Press. ISBN 9781783271733.
- Hamilton, Bernard (2000). The Leper King and His Heirs: Baldwin IV and the Crusader Kingdom of Jerusalem. Cambridge University Press. ISBN 978-0-521-64187-6.
- Runciman, Steven (1989). A History of the Crusades, Volume II: The Kingdom of Jerusalem and the Frankish East, 1100–1187. Cambridge University Press. ISBN 0-521-06163-6.
