= Küçükdalyan =

- Neighbourhood
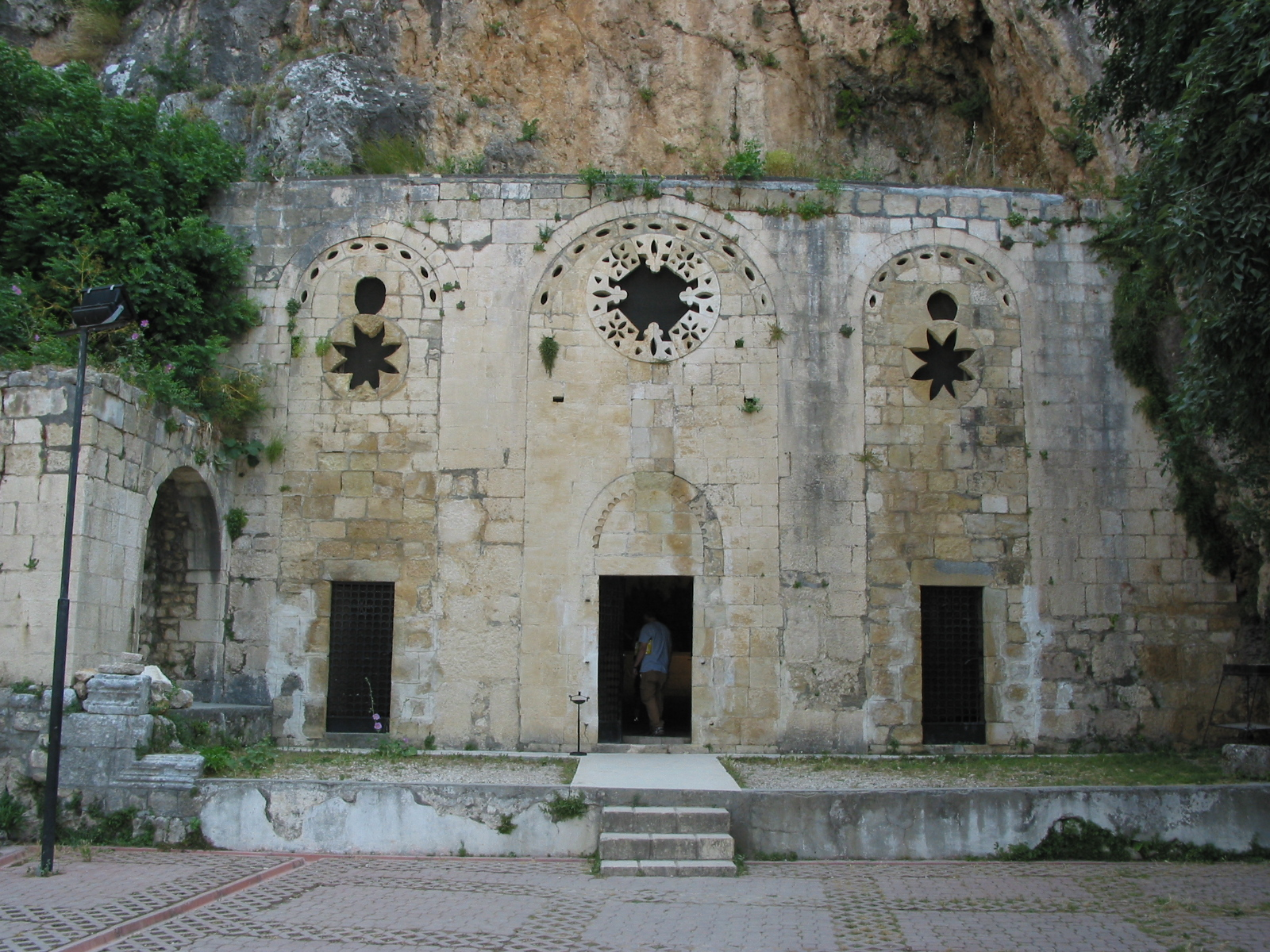
- St Pierre Church of Antakya

- Location within Turkey
- Coordinates: 36°13′N 36°10′E
- Country: Turkey
- Province: Hatay
- District: Antakya
- Elevation: 85 m (279 ft)
- Population (2022): 10,600
- Time zone: UTC+3 (TRT)
- Postal code: 31060
- Area code: 0326

Küçükdalyan is a neighbourhood of the municipality and district of Antakya, Hatay Province, Turkey. Its population is 10,600 (2022). Before the 2013 reorganisation, it was a town (belde).

Küçükdalyan is situated to the east of Asi River (Orontes of the antiquity) and it is almost merged to Antakya. A part of the town is founded in ancient Antiocheia (Antioch) and is officially declared SIT area (Archaeological site). The Church of St Peter is in the neighbourhood of Küçükdalyan. Küçükdalyan was declared as a seat of township in 1994. Major crops of the town are olive, vegetables and fruits.
