= Narlıca =

- Neighbourhood
- Location in Turkey
- Coordinates: 36°14′N 36°13′E
- Country: Turkey
- Province: Hatay
- District: Antakya
- Elevation: 190 m (620 ft)
- Population (2022): 18,445
- Time zone: UTC+3 (TRT)
- Postal code: 31060
- Area code: 0326

Narlıca (known as Narlija in Arabic) is a neighbourhood of the municipality and district of Antakya, Hatay Province, Turkey. Its population is 18,445 (2022). Before the 2013 reorganisation, it was a town (belde). Narlıca is 5 kilometres (3.1 mi) north east of the city center.
