= Kışlak =

Settlement in Hatay Province, Turkey

- Neighbourhood
- Location within Turkey
- Coordinates: 35°58′N 36°9′E
- Country: Turkey
- Province: Hatay
- District: Yayladağı
- Elevation: 627 m (2,057 ft)
- Population (2022): 898
- Time zone: UTC+3 (TRT)
- Area code: 0326

Kışlak is a neighbourhood of the municipality and district of Yayladağı, Hatay Province, Turkey. Its population is 898 (2022). Before the 2013 reorganisation, it was a town (belde).

Distance to Yayladağı is 18 kilometres (11 mi) and to Antakya (administrative center of Hatay Province) is 35 kilometres (22 mi).

== History ==
There are traces of human habitation dated upper Palaeolithic around Kışlak. Akkadian Empire, Yamhad Kingdom, Hittite Empire, Egyptian Kingdom, Achaemenid Empire, Ptolemaic dynasty of Egypt, Roman Empire, Byzantine Empire, Umayyad Caliphate, Seljuk Turks, Crusades, Egyptian Mamluks and Ottoman Turks ruled the area around Kışlak. The first documented settlement in Kışlak dates back to 300 years ago during Ottoman rule. Between 1918 and 1938 the town was under French Mandate. In 1939 together with the rest of Hatay Republic it merged to Turkey. In 1998 Kışlak was declared a seat of township.

== Economy ==
Cereal, tobacco and olive are the main agricultural products of Kışlak. There is also an olive oil press in the town. Nuts, figs and pomegranate are also produced.
