= Karaağaç, Hatay =

Karaağaç
- Neighbourhood
- Location in Turkey
- Coordinates: 36°34′N 36°08′E
- Country: Turkey
- Province: Hatay
- District: Arsuz
- Elevation: 9 m (30 ft)
- Population (2022): 33,718
- Time zone: UTC+3 (TRT)
- Postal code: 31290
- Area code: 0326

Karaağaç is a neighbourhood of the municipality and district of Arsuz, Hatay Province, Turkey. Its population is 33,718 (2022). Before the 2013 reorganisation, it was a town (belde). Also in 2013, it passed from the district of İskenderun to the new district of Arsuz. It is subdivided into four mahalle: Cumhuriyet, Konarlı, Övündük and Şarkonak.

Karaağaç is very close to İskenderun and it is almost at the coast of Mediterranean Sea. Its distance to Antakya (center of the province) is about 62 kilometres (39 mi). Karaağaç is a relatively new town. 200 years ago, five close villages were founded by the people from Belen, a district center about 15 kilometres (9.3 mi) at the north. After a considerable increase in population, in 1986 four of these villages voted to be united as a township. Now the former villages are the quarters of the town.
