= Bekbele =

- Neighbourhood
- Location in Turkey
- Coordinates: 36°37′N 36°14′E
- Country: Turkey
- Province: Hatay
- District: İskenderun
- Elevation: 130 m (430 ft)
- Population (2022): 8,148
- Time zone: UTC+3 (TRT)
- Postal code: 31280
- Area code: 0326

Bekbele is a neighbourhood of the municipality and district of İskenderun, Hatay Province, Turkey. Its population is 8,148 (2022). Before the 2013 reorganisation, it was a town (belde). It is situated mostly to the east of Çukurova Motorway and is almost merged to İskenderun. The distance to Antakya (the administrative center of the province) is about 80 kilometres (50 mi). The settlement was founded by a tribe named Abacılı from Dulkadir territory (present Kahramanmaraş Province) of the Ottoman Empire towards the end of the 18th century. According to mayor's page, Abacılı which refers to manufacturing coarse woolen cloth was a subtribe of Bayat, a Turkmen tribe.
