= Avsuyu =

- Neighbourhood
- Location in Turkey
- Coordinates: 36°12′N 36°19′E
- Country: Turkey
- Province: Hatay
- District: Antakya
- Elevation: 170 m (560 ft)
- Population (2022): 5,124
- Time zone: UTC+3 (TRT)
- Postal code: 31060
- Area code: 0326

Avsuyu is a neighbourhood of the municipality and district of Antakya, Hatay Province, Turkey. Its population is 5,124 (2022). Before the 2013 reorganisation, it was a town (belde). It is situated on the north coast of Yarseli Dam reservoir. It is about 29 kilometres (18 mi) north east of Antakya. Main crops of the town are olive, pepper, tobacco and cotton. There is an oil press in the town.
