= Yeşilköy, Hatay =

Yeşilköy
- Neighbourhood
- Location within Turkey
- Coordinates: 36°52′N 36°12′E
- Country: Turkey
- Province: Hatay
- District: Dörtyol
- Elevation: 50 m (160 ft)
- Population (2022): 10,436
- Time zone: UTC+3 (TRT)
- Postal code: 31600
- Area code: 0326

Yeşilköy is a neighbourhood of the municipality and district of Dörtyol, Hatay Province, Turkey. Its population is 10,436 (2022). Before the 2013 reorganisation, it was a town (belde). It is situated between Nur Mountains and the Mediterranean Sea coast. Turkish state highway D.817 is to the west, Çukurova Motorway is to the east and Dörtyol is to the south of the town. Yeşilköy is almost merged to Dörtyol. The distance to Antakya (center of the province) is 90 kilometres (56 mi). Yeşilköy was declared a seat of township in 1968. The main agricultural crops are citrus and vegetables. The town is in a flourishing industrial area. Services to summer houses around the town also constitute a part of town revenue.

Part of the village's territory includes the archaeological site of Issus, the ancient settlement that gave its name to several important battles. Most notably, the Battle of Issus was the decisive contest in Alexander the Great's invasion of the Persian Empire.
