= Bezge =

Bezge Yeditepe
- Neighbourhood
- Location in Turkey
- Coordinates: 35°58′N 36°01′E
- Country: Turkey
- Province: Hatay
- District: Yayladağı
- Elevation: 765 m (2,510 ft)
- Population (2022): 867
- Time zone: UTC+3 (TRT)
- Area code: 0326

Bezge (formerly: Yeditepe) is a neighbourhood of the municipality and district of Yayladağı, Hatay Province, Turkey. Its population is 867 (2022). Before the 2013 reorganisation, it was a town (belde). It is 10 kilometres (6 mi) northwest from Yayladağı.
