= Kumlu =

- District and municipality
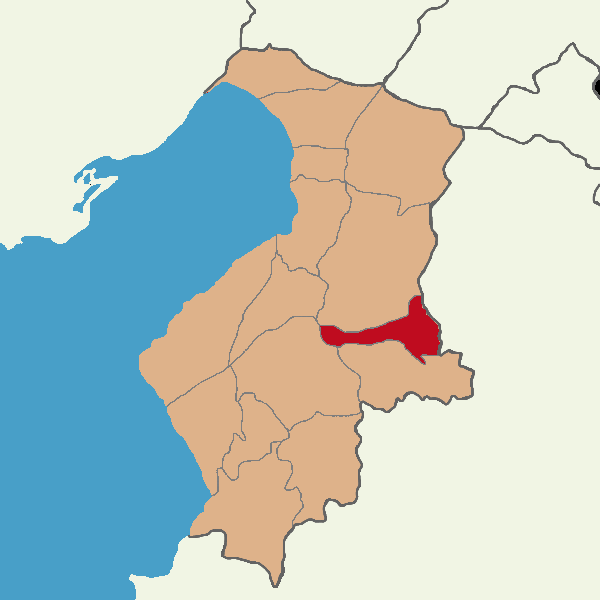
- Map showing Kumlu District in Hatay Province

- Location within Turkey
- Coordinates: 36°22′22″N 36°27′10″E
- Country: Turkey
- Province: Hatay

Government
  - Mayor: Ibrahim Paç (BBP)
- Area: 193 km^{2} (75 sq mi)
- Elevation: 89 m (292 ft)
- Population (2022): 13,333
  - Density: 69.1/km^{2} (179/sq mi)
- Time zone: UTC+3 (TRT)
- Postal code: 31520
- Area code: 0326
- Website: www.kumlu.bel.tr

Kumlu is a municipality and district of Hatay Province, Turkey. Its area is 193 km^{2}, and its population is 13,333 (2022). It lies in the Amik Valley plain, on the road between Antakya and Reyhanlı.

== Geography ==
To the west and north of Kumlu is Kırıkhan; to the east is Syria; and to the south is Reyhanlı. The general landscape of Kumlu is very flat. The Amik Plain includes tiny plateaus. Kumlu is situated at a height of 97 meters (318 feet). At the centre of Kumlu is a flat area in the Amik Plain.

== Composition ==
There are 16 neighbourhoods in Kumlu District:

- Akkerpiç
- Akkuyu
- Akpınar
- Aktaş
- Batıayrancı
- Cumhuriyet
- Doğuayrancı
- Fevziçakmak
- Gökçeoğlu
- Gülova
- Hamam
- Hatayhamamı
- Kaletepe
- Kelli
- Kırcaoğlu
- Muharrem

== Population ==
Historical population
Year	Pop.	±% p.a.
1990	15,541	—
1997	13,258	−2.24%
2007	13,210	−0.04%
2012	13,065	−0.22%
2017	13,228	+0.25%
2022	13,333	+0.16%
Source: 1990 census, 1997 census and TÜIK (2007-2022)

The province is mainly populated by Sunni Arabs
