= Aktepe, Hassa =

Settlement in Turkey

Aktepe
- Neighbourhood
- Location in Turkey
- Coordinates: 36°42′N 36°29′E
- Country: Turkey
- Province: Hatay
- District: Hassa
- Elevation: 282 m (925 ft)
- Population (2022): 8,736
- Time zone: UTC+3 (TRT)
- Area code: 0326

Aktepe is a neighbourhood of the municipality and district of Hassa, Hatay Province, Turkey. Its population is 8,736 (2022). Before the 2013 reorganisation, it was a town (belde).

== Geography ==
Aktepe is 12 kilometres (7.5 mi) south of the central town of Hassa and 67 kilometres (42 mi) north of Antakya, the capital of the province.

== History ==
Although there are ruins of ancients settlements around, the village of Aktepe was established in 1923. After a rapid increase in population, it was declared a township in 1972. The master plan of the town construction was completed in 1988.

== Economy ==
Cereals, cotton soybean and fruits are the main crops cultivated in the town. Aktepe is situated at the intersection of various villages roads, as well as the highway connecting Antakya to north. The transit trade of agricultural products is another economic activity. There are also three olive oil factories in the town.
