= Gözcüler =

Gözcüler Alakop
- Neighbourhood
- Location in Turkey
- Coordinates: 36°23′N 35°55′E
- Country: Turkey
- Province: Hatay
- District: Arsuz
- Elevation: 50 m (160 ft)
- Population (2022): 6,565
- Time zone: UTC+3 (TRT)
- Postal code: 31225
- Area code: 0326

Gözcüler (former Alakop, Turkish for "many Alawites") is a neighbourhood of the municipality and district of Arsuz, Hatay Province, Turkey. Its population is 6,565 (2022). Before the 2013 reorganisation, it was a town (belde) in the district of İskenderun, but it became administratively part of the new district of Arsuz.

It is situated to the south of İskenderun and to the east of Arsuz (Uluçınar). Although not a coastal town, the distance to Mediterranean Sea coast is only 5 kilometres (3.1 mi). The distance to İskenderun is 32 kilometres (20 mi) and to Antakya (province center) is 96 kilometres (60 mi).

After the First World War most of Hatay province was occupied by France and the settlement was named as Elvehep referring to a certain Abdülwahab Pasha who owned most of the territory around. After Turkey annexed Hatay in 1939, the settlement was renamed as Alakop and after 1960 as Gözcüler (literally “watchmen”). Gözcüler was declared a seat of township in 1988. Although most of town revenue is from agriculture, the touristic potential is promising.
