= Karakese =

- Neighbourhood
- Location in Turkey
- Coordinates: 36°49′N 36°15′E
- Country: Turkey
- Province: Hatay
- District: Dörtyol
- Elevation: 150 m (490 ft)
- Population (2022): 5,994
- Time zone: UTC+3 (TRT)
- Postal code: 31600
- Area code: 0326

Karakese is a neighbourhood of the municipality and district of Dörtyol, Hatay Province, Turkey. Its population is 5,994 (2022). Before the 2013 reorganisation, it was a town (belde).

== Geography ==
Karakese is situated to the east of Turkish motorway O.53. Distance to Dörtyol is 4 kilometres (2.5 mi), and to Antakya (the province center) is 97 kilometres (60 mi).

== History ==
The area around Karakese had always been inhabited all through the history. But the settlement was founded about 500 years ago by Turkmen people who were subjects of Akkoyunlu sultanate, but escaped to south after the Battle of Otlukbeli in 1473. The settlement is known as one of the first places where Turkish resistance to French occupation began after the First World War. (One quarter of Karakese is named İlkkurşun meaning "First bullet" referring to the first resistance on 11 December 1918.) In 1992 the settlement was declared a seat of township.

== Economy ==
Main economic activity of the town is citrus and fresh vegetable farming. People working in services and industry around Dörtyol also contribute to Town economy.
