= Yayladağı =

- District and municipality
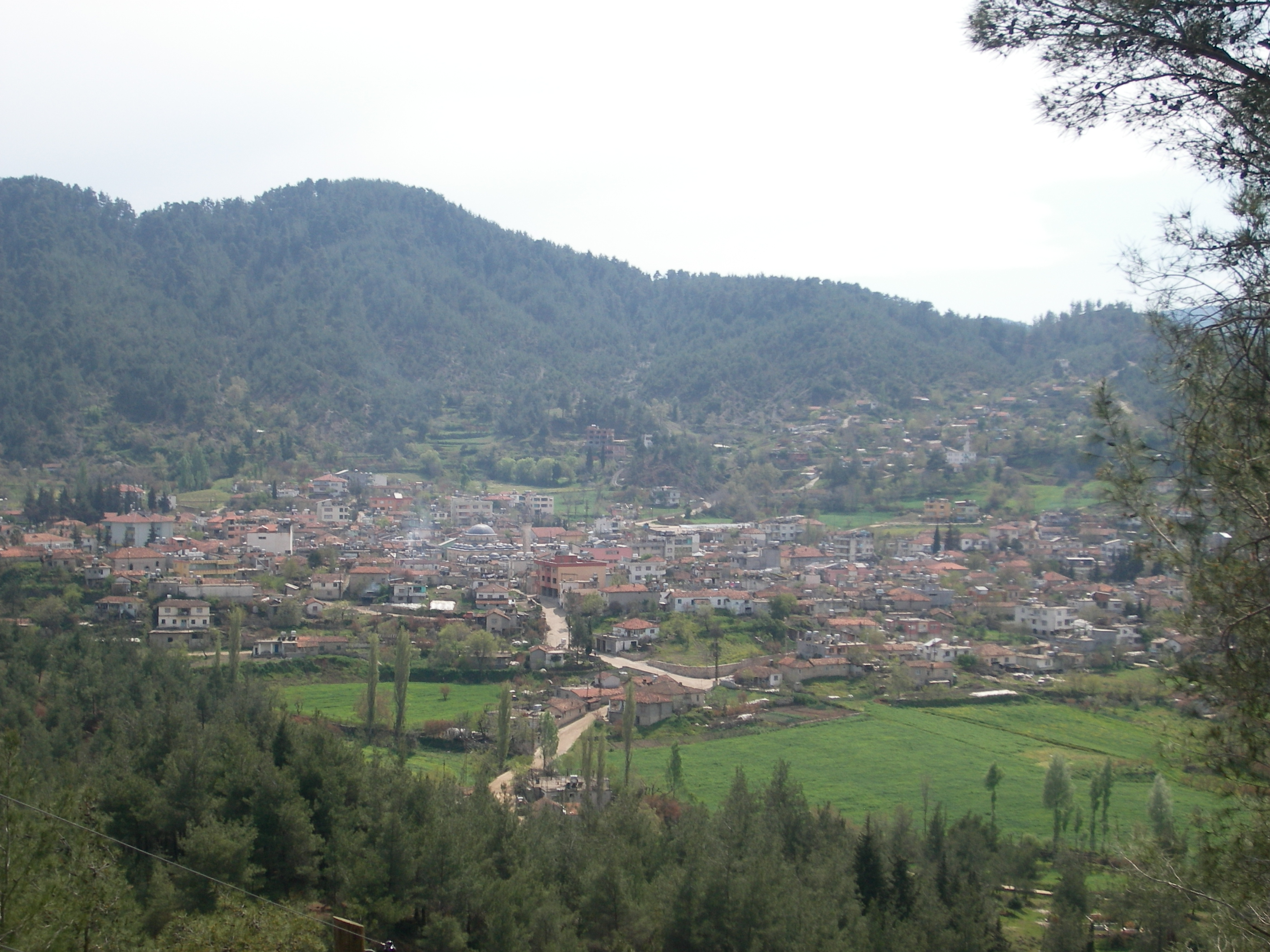

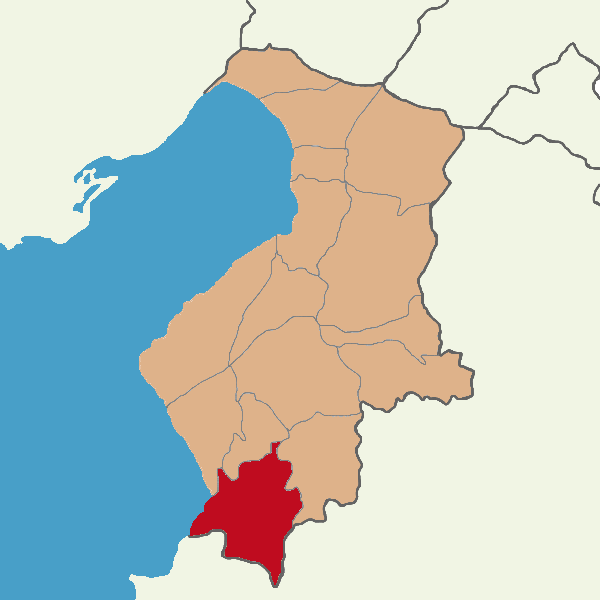
- Map showing Yayladağı District in Hatay Province

- Location within Turkey
- Coordinates: 35°54′09″N 36°03′38″E
- Country: Turkey
- Province: Hatay

Government
  - Mayor: Mehmet Yalçın (AKP)
- Area: 445 km^{2} (172 sq mi)
- Elevation: 450 m (1,480 ft)
- Population (2022): 36,803
  - Density: 82.7/km^{2} (214/sq mi)
- Time zone: UTC+3 (TRT)
- Postal code: 31550
- Area code: 0326
- Website: www.yayladagi.bel.tr

Yayladağı (pronounced [ˈjajɫaˈdaɯ]), formerly Ordu (Arabic: اوردو, romanized: ʾŪrdū; Western Armenian: Օրտու, romanized: Ōrdu), is a municipality and district of Hatay Province, Turkey. Its area is 445 km^{2}, and its population is 36,803 (2022). It is on the border with Syria, 51 km (32 mi) south of the city of Antakya.

Yayladağı was heavily damaged by powerful earthquakes in February 2023 and subsequent aftershocks.

== Demographics ==
19th-century German traveler Martin Hartmann noted that the town was made up of 150 Muslim and 30 Greek households. He further listed 29 additional settlements in the Ottoman nahiyah of Urdu: 18 settlements were Sunni Muslim (totaling to 495 houses), 14 of which were Turkish (400 houses). 1 settlement was Alawite (20 houses). 2 settlements were Armenian, one being Kessab (200 houses) and the other a village (15 houses). Hartmann didn't include any information on the remaining 7 settlements.

After the Syrian Civil War broke out, nearly 2,000 Syrian Turkmen moved here from Turkmen Mountain.

== Geography ==
Today, Yayladağı itself is a small town, providing the district with a health centre, high schools and other basics.

This is a mountainous district with a typical Mediterranean climate of hot, dry summers and warm, wet winters, but being inland and high up, Yayladağı is cooler than most of Hatay, even seeing snow on the mountain peaks in winter. The main source of income is agriculture, 96 km^{2} (37 sq mi) of the land (small valleys and plateau in the mountains) is cultivated with olives, tobacco, vegetables, grains and other crops, the remainder is forest and mountain. The mountainsides are covered with pine, sandalwood and rough oak, or else shrubs including bay, thyme and oleander. Animals, especially goats, are grazed on the hillsides.

Yayladağı has a border crossing into Syria, and the village of Topraktutan, Turkey's southernmost point. The state road D.825 (European route E91) connects the border checkpoint with Antakya.

== Composition ==
There are 47 neighbourhoods in Yayladağı District:

- Arslanyazı
- Aşağıpulluyazı
- Aydınbahçe
- Ayışığı
- Bezge
- Bozlu
- Çabala
- Çakıköy
- Çaksına
- Çamaltı
- Çandır
- Çatbaşı
- Çayır
- Denizgören
- Dusduru
- Eğerci
- Görentaş
- Gözlüce
- Gürışık
- Güveççi
- Güzelyurt
- Hisarcık
- Karacurun
- Karaköse
- Kışlak
- Kızılçat
- Kösrelik
- Kulaç
- Kurtuluş
- Leylekli
- Olgunlar
- Şakşak
- Sebenoba
- Şenköy
- Sungur
- Sürütme
- Turfanda
- Tutlubahçe
- Üçırmak
- Uluyol
- Yalaz
- Yayıkdamlar
- Yeniceköy
- Yeşiltepe
- Yoncakaya
- Yukarıokçular
- Yukarıpulluyazı
