= Akbez =

- Neighbourhood
- Location in Turkey
- Coordinates: 36°51′N 36°31′E
- Country: Turkey
- Province: Hatay
- District: Hassa
- Elevation: 614 m (2,014 ft)
- Population (2022): 10,228
- Time zone: UTC+3 (TRT)
- Postal code: 31700
- Area code: 0326

Akbez is a neighbourhood of the municipality and district of Hassa, Hatay Province, Turkey. Its population is 10,228 (2022). Before the 2013 reorganisation, it was a town (belde).

== Geography ==
Akbez is situated at the extreme north of the province where the road from Kilis Province intersects the main highway running from north to south. It is 7 kilometres (4.3 mi) from Hassa.

== History ==
Akbez township was established in 1972 by merging the two villages of Salmanuşağı and Nuhuşağı. During the early years of the Turkish Republic, these villages were in the Province of Cebeli Bereket. After this province was abolished in 1933, the villages were made a part of Gaziantep Province. But after the Hatay Republic was merged into Turkey in 1939, the villages as well as the rest of Hassa were made a part of Hatay Province.

== Demographics ==
During German traveler Martin Hartmann's visit, the Ottoman nahiyah of Ekbez had 8 villages with 6 being Turkish (132 houses), 1 being Turkish majority and Armenian minority (30 houses), and 1 being Armenian and Turkish plurality (50 houses).

== Economy ==
The main agricultural products are grapes, cotton, soybean and olive. There are two olive oil press facilities in the town.
