= Dörtyol =

- District and municipality
- Logo

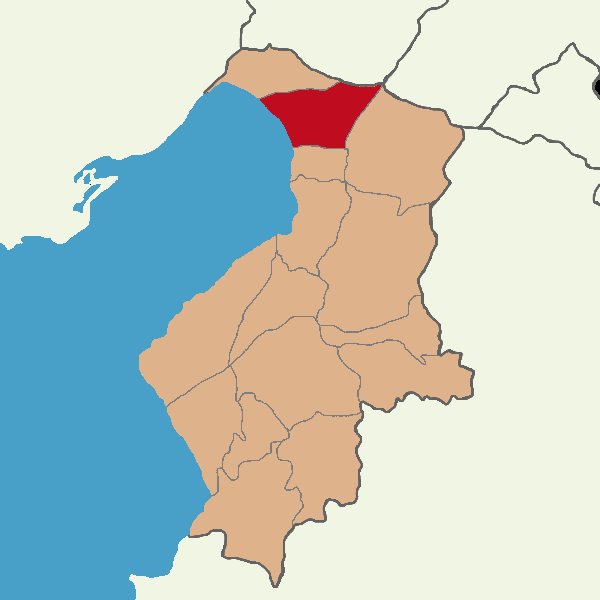
- Map showing Dörtyol District in Hatay Province

- Location within Turkey
- Coordinates: 36°50′34″N 36°13′28″E
- Country: Turkey
- Province: Hatay

Government
  - Mayor: Dr. Bahadır Amaç (CHP)
- Area: 342 km^{2} (132 sq mi)
- Elevation: 57 m (187 ft)
- Population (2022): 128,941
  - Density: 377/km^{2} (976/sq mi)
- Time zone: UTC+3 (TRT)
- Postal code: 31600
- Area code: 0326
- Website: www.dortyol.bel.tr

Dörtyol, historically Chork Marzban (Western Armenian: Չորք Մարզպան, romanized: Č'ork' Marzban, lit. 'four reaches'), is a municipality and district of Hatay Province, Turkey. Its area is 342 km^{2}, and its population is 128,941 (2022). It is a port city and oil terminus located 26 km north of the city of İskenderun, near the easternmost point of the Mediterranean at the head of the Gulf of İskenderun.

== Geography ==
The name Dörtyol means "crossroads" (literally "four roads" or "reaches") in Turkish, as it did in the former Armenian name; indeed, the town, sits on a crossing of highways, especially the O-53 from Anatolia south into Hatay and on to Syria. The road is channelled along the narrow coastal strip with the Nur Mountains (the ancient Amanos) behind.

Dörtyol is at the edge of the Çukurova Plain and being near the coast, it is humid, and the countryside is fairly green and fertile. Therefore, alongside oil handling, the economic activities of the district include forestry, cotton, and the cultivation of citrus fruits, especially a local variety of tangerines.

=== Climate ===
Dörtyol has a hot-summer Mediterranean climate (Köppen: Csa), with very hot, humid, and somewhat dry summers, and mild, wet winters.

Climate data for Dörtyol (1991–2020)
Month	Jan	Feb	Mar	Apr	May	Jun	Jul	Aug	Sep	Oct	Nov	Dec	Year
Mean daily maximum °C (°F)	15.5 (59.9)	16.7 (62.1)	19.5 (67.1)	23.1 (73.6)	26.8 (80.2)	29.6 (85.3)	31.7 (89.1)	32.6 (90.7)	31.3 (88.3)	28.2 (82.8)	22.2 (72.0)	17.2 (63.0)	24.6 (76.3)
Daily mean °C (°F)	10.3 (50.5)	11.4 (52.5)	14.4 (57.9)	17.8 (64.0)	21.7 (71.1)	25.1 (77.2)	27.7 (81.9)	28.5 (83.3)	26.3 (79.3)	22.3 (72.1)	16.1 (61.0)	11.8 (53.2)	19.5 (67.1)
Mean daily minimum °C (°F)	6.1 (43.0)	6.9 (44.4)	9.6 (49.3)	12.9 (55.2)	16.8 (62.2)	20.6 (69.1)	23.7 (74.7)	24.6 (76.3)	21.6 (70.9)	17.2 (63.0)	11.3 (52.3)	7.6 (45.7)	14.9 (58.8)
Average precipitation mm (inches)	105.15 (4.14)	106.97 (4.21)	104.74 (4.12)	87.89 (3.46)	59.19 (2.33)	53.35 (2.10)	29.21 (1.15)	36.23 (1.43)	75.25 (2.96)	90.26 (3.55)	85.87 (3.38)	113.01 (4.45)	947.12 (37.29)
Average precipitation days (≥ 1.0 mm)	8.7	9.0	8.8	7.6	5.4	3.7	3.2	3.7	5.3	5.9	6.3	8.5	76.1
Average relative humidity (%)	60.9	58.6	58.8	60.8	61.2	62.2	64.6	62.6	57.3	54.3	55.0	61.4	59.8
Source: NOAA

== History ==
This crossroads has seen the passage of numerous armies and some of the biggest military campaigns in history, including the Battle of Issus between Alexander the Great and Darius in 333 BC.

Approximately 8,000 Armenians lived in Dörtyol in 1908 and 12,300 on the eve of World War I. Armenians also knew the settlement as Chork Marzban(k) or Chork Marzvan(k). In 1895 the Armenians of Dörtyol resisted the Hamidian massacres. In 1909, during the Adana massacre, the Armenians of Dörtyol resisted the massacres again, but many of them were killed. From 1919 to 1921, the Armenians again resisted the Armenian genocide, but were almost completely exterminated. After the end of World War I the French and the Turks agreed on the Syrian-Turkish border following the Franco-Turkish War, thus Dörtyol fell on the Turkish side, and the surviving Armenians fled to Alexandretta, Aleppo, and Amman.

Dörtyol is remembered in Turkey as the scene of the first fighting in the Turkish War of Independence. The fighting with the French occupying forces was ignited in Karakese, which is located on the edge of the mountainous village of Nur. In 1918, Dörtyol was occupied by French troops. Turks in the area retreated to the hills and began their resistance under the leadership of Kara Hasan Pasha. Thus, Dörtyol ultimately never became part of the Republic of Hatay, but instead functioned as a Turkish district added to Hatay when the province was brought into the Turkish Republic in 1939.

Dörtyol was heavily damaged by powerful earthquakes in February 2023 and subsequent aftershocks.

During the 2026 Iran war, Dörtyol was the site where a NATO missile defense system intercepted an Iranian ballistic missile on March 4, causing debris and fragments to fall across the district without causing injuries. The missile is believed to have been aimed at Incirlik Air Base, a hub for U.S. air forces. The close call sparked debate whether this would trigger Article 5 of NATO, U.S. Defense Secretary Pete Hegseth noted that there was "no sense" that the specific engagement would trigger Article 5.

== Composition ==
There are 15 neighbourhoods in Dörtyol District:

- Altınçağ
- Çatköy
- Çaylı
- Kapılı
- Karakese
- Kışlalar
- Konaklı
- Kuzuculu
- Numune Evler
- Ocaklı
- Özerli
- Sanayi
- Yeniyurt
- Yeşil
- Yeşilköy

== Demographics ==
=== History ===
According to travellers Carl Humann and Otto Puchstein, during the 19th century, the town of Chok Merzimen was exclusively inhabited by Armenians with 300 homes.

== Popular culture ==
The town is mentioned in The Forty Days of Musa Dagh.
