= Harbiye, Defne =

Suburb of Antakya, Turkey

Harbiye
- Neighbourhood
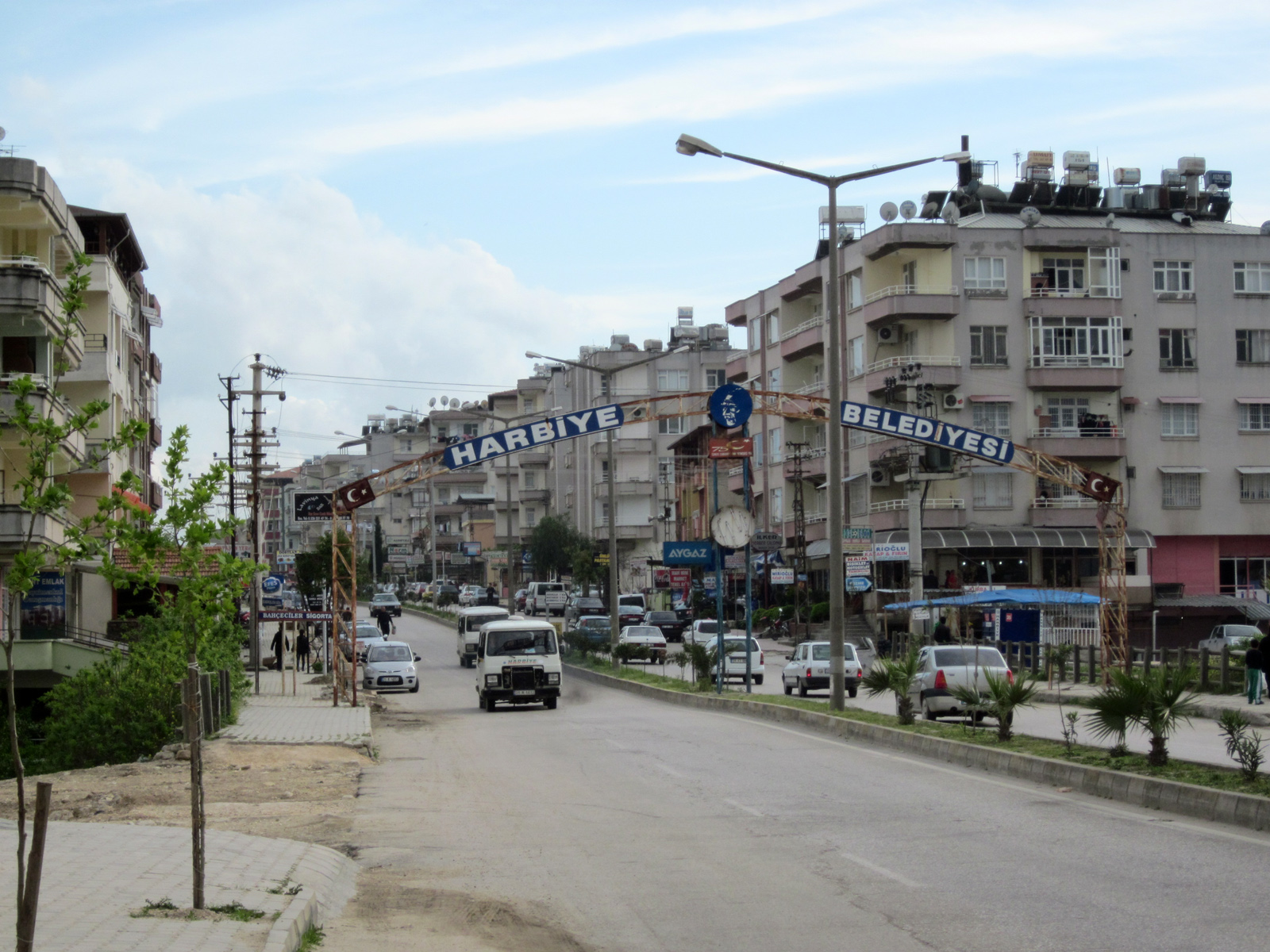

- Location within Turkey
- Coordinates: 36°08′42″N 36°08′28″E
- Country: Turkey
- Province: Hatay
- District: Defne
- Elevation: 240 m (790 ft)
- Population (2022): 27,057
- Time zone: UTC+3 (TRT)
- Area code: 0326

Harbiye (Ancient Greek: Δάφνη, romanized: Dáphnē; in Arabic دفنه or Harbiyat, حربيات) is a neighbourhood of the municipality and district of Defne, Hatay Province, Turkey. Its population is 27,057 (2022). Before the 2013 reorganisation, it was a town (belde). Also in 2013, it passed from the former central district of Hatay to the new district of Defne. Harbiye is predominantly populated by Alawites.

== Geography ==
Midtown Harbiye is about 7 kilometres (4 mi) south of Antakya, the administrative center of Hatay Province. It is situated in the valley of Asi (formerly known as Orontes) with an average altitude of 240 metres (790 ft).

== History ==
Daphne (Δάφνη in Greek) was a resort port-town during Seleucid Empire, famous for waterfalls, daphne laurels, and residence buildings. However, it was also famous for earthquakes; many ancients buildings were demolished during big earthquakes. Under the Roman Empire, aqueducts were built to connect the local springs to the city of Antioch and there were several villas in Daphne.

Following the First Jewish–Roman War, the Roman Vespasian seized land which had previously held a synagogue, and, using funds taken from local Jewish people, built a theatre in its place. Vespasian announced this by placing a commemorative plaque at the location, which Israeli historican Hayim Hillel Ben-Sasson characterized as "an insult to injury".

For many centuries, many monastic communities from different ethnicities settled in the region around Antioch as for instance in Daphne. The Kastana monastery, dedicated to the Theotokos, was close to the Kastalia springs in Daphne. Ephrem Mtsire, a famous 11th century Georgian monk, theologian and translator of patristic literature, was hegumen of this monastery.

== Economy ==
Harbiye's main economic activity is domestic tourism: hotels, restaurants, souvenir shops etc. The town is proud of the Daphne mythology. There is also a minor silk industry. Many Harbiye residents commute to work in Antakya.
