= Hassa, Hatay =

Hassa
- District and municipality
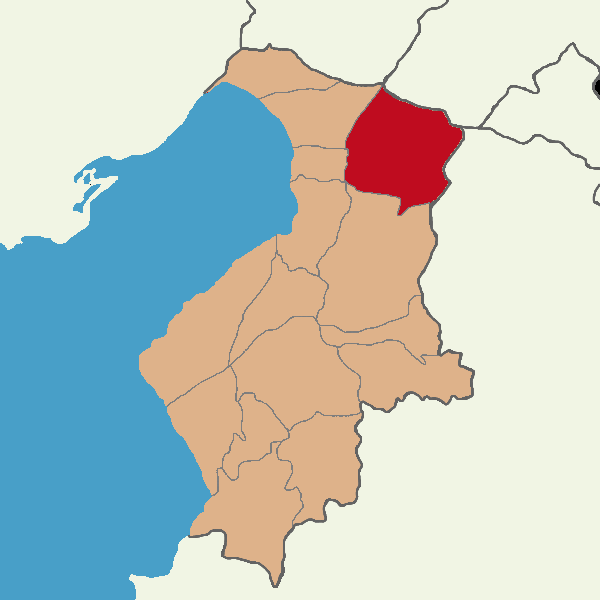
- Map showing Hassa District in Hatay Province

- Location in Turkey
- Coordinates: 36°47′58″N 36°31′04″E
- Country: Turkey
- Province: Hatay

Government
  - Mayor: Selahattin Çolak (AKP)
- Area: 520 km^{2} (200 sq mi)
- Elevation: 430 m (1,410 ft)
- Population (2022): 56,675
  - Density: 110/km^{2} (280/sq mi)
- Time zone: UTC+3 (TRT)
- Postal code: 31700
- Area code: 0326
- Website: www.hassa.bel.tr

Hassa is a municipality and district of Hatay Province, Turkey. Its area is 520 km^{2}, and its population is 56,675 (2022). It is on the eastern side of the Nur (Amanos) Mountains, looking towards the city of Gaziantep. It is on the Antakya-Malatya road. In the late 19th and early 20th century, Hassa was part of the Adana Vilayet of the Ottoman Empire. Its inhabitants were predominantly Yoruk Turkmens. Hassa was a district in Cebel-i Bereket Province from 1923 to 1933 and then a part of Gaziantep Province until 1939.

Hassa is an olive-growing district. The olive trees were first brought there by Ottoman governor Derviş Paşa in the late 19th century. Hassa was heavily damaged by powerful earthquakes in February 2023 and subsequent aftershocks. The same year it recorded the hottest temperature so far in Turkey as of 2023 at 50 °C (122 °F)

== Composition ==
There are 39 neighbourhoods in Hassa District:

- 15 Kasım
- Akbez
- Akkülek
- Aktepe
- Ardıçlı
- Arpalıuşağı
- Aşağıkarafakılı
- Bademli
- Bintaş
- Buhara
- Çay
- Çınarbaşı
- Dedemli
- Demrek
- Dervişpaşa
- Eğribucak
- Gazeluşağı
- Girne
- Gülkent
- Gülpınar
- Güvenç
- Hacılar
- Haydarlar
- Katranlık
- Koruhüyük
- Küreci
- Mazmanlı
- Sapanözü
- Söğüt
- Sugediği
- Tepebaşı
- Tiyek
- Yeni
- Yeniyapan
- Yoluklar
- Yukarıbucak
- Yukarıkarafakılı
- Yuvalı
- Zeytinoba
