= Hatay Büyükşehir Belediyesi (men's volleyball) =

Hatay Büyükşehir Belediye Gençlik ve Spor Kulübü
- Leagues: Turkish Men's Volleyball League
- Founded: 2011
- Arena: Antakya Sport Hall (capacity: 2,500)
- Location: Antakya/Hatay, Turkey
- Team colors: Blue and White
- President: (Turkey) Lütfü Savaş
- Website: hataybbspor.com

Hatay Büyükşehir Belediye Men Volleyball is the men volleyball section of Hatay Büyükşehir Belediyespor, a major sports club in Hatay, Turkey.

== Previous names ==
- Antakya Belediyesi (2011–2014)
- Hatay Büyükşehir Belediyespor (2014–present)

== League performances ==
Season	League	Pos	Pld	W	L	SW	SL	P
2010–11	Turkish Men's Regional Volleyball League – Group S	2	6	4	2	14	10	12
2011–12	Turkish Men's Third Volleyball League – Group C	5	16	10	6	35	23	29
2012–13	Turkish Men's Second Volleyball League – Group B	7	20	9	11	34	42	24
2013–14	Turkish Men's Second Volleyball League – Group B	7	22	12	10	42	35	36
2014–15	Turkish Men's Second Volleyball League – Group B	6	22	13	9	50	37	39
2015–16	Turkish Men's Second Volleyball League – Group B	3	24	20	4	63	23	57
	Turkish Men's Second Volleyball League – Semifinals 1. Group	3	3	1	2	3	6	3
2016–17	Turkish Men's First Volleyball League – Group B	4	26	21	5	66	23	64
	Turkish Men's First Volleyball League – Semifinals 2. Group	2	3	1	2	5	6	4
	Turkish Men's First Volleyball League – Final	4	3	0	3	1	9	0
