= Hatay Büyükşehir Belediyesi (deaf football) =

Hatay Büyükşehir Belediye Gençlik ve Spor Kulübü
- Nickname: Hatay BŞB İESK
- Leagues: Turkish Deaf Football Super League
- Arena: Nazım Koka Stadium
- Location: Antakya/Hatay, Turkey
- Team colors: Blue and White
- President: (Turkey) Lütfü Savaş
- 2014–15 position: 4th
- Website: hataybbspor.com

Hatay BŞB İESK is the deaf football section of Hatay Büyükşehir Belediyespor, a major sports club in Hatay, Turkey. The team competes in Turkish Deaf Football Super League.

== Previous names ==
- Antakya İESK (2012–2014)
- Hatay BŞB İESK (2014–present)

== League participations ==
- Turkish Deaf Football Super League: 2014–2016
- Turkish Deaf Football First League: 2012–2014, 2016–present

== Achievements ==
- Turkish Deaf Football First League
  - Third (1): 2013–2014

== League performances ==
Season	League	Pos	Pld	W	D	L	PF	PA	Pts
2012–13	Turkish Deaf Football First League – 4th Group	2	14	8	2	4	34	18	26
	Turkish Deaf Football First League – Playoffs Group A	4	3	0	1	2	0	4	1
2013–14	Turkish Deaf Football First League – 4th Group	2	17	12	2	3	51	22	38
	Turkish Deaf Football First League – Playoffs Group B	2	3	2	0	1	5	6	6
	Turkish Deaf Football First League – Final Group	3	2	1	0	1	3	9	3
2014–15	Turkish Deaf Football Super League	4	22	10	5	7	53	41	35
2015–16	Turkish Deaf Football Super League	6	22	10	1	11	49	48	31
2016–17	Turkish Deaf Football First League – 3rd Group	2	14	11	2	1	38	16	35

Promotion
Relegation
