= Ṣidqī Ismail =

Syrian writer and playwright

Ṣidqi Ismaʿil
- صدقي إسماعيل
- Born: 1924; Antakya
- Died: 26 September 1972 (aged 47–48); Damascus
- Education: Damascus University
- Occupations: Novelist, writer and playwright
- Known for: Writing novels and shortstories. Translating.
- Notable work: God and Poverty or "Allahu Wa Al-Faqr"
- Movement: Member of The Story and Fiction Association

Ṣidqi Bin ʿAli Ismaʿil (صدقي بن علي إسماعيل, 1924 – 26 September 1972) was a Syrian scholar, writer, novelist, and playwright. His work promoted the cause of Arab Nationalism, and Arab history and culture.

== Personal life ==
Ṣidqi Ismaʿil was born and educated in Antakya, son ofʿAli Ismaʿil. He was one of four brothers, all of whom were scholars and artists. His family was originally Arab, from Sanjak of Alexandretta. They immigrated from Sanjak after it was alienated from Syria in 1938. The family had a notable influence on the literary and artistic revival that took place in Syria after independence.

== Education ==
Ṣidqi Ismaʿil finished his elementary school education at Al-ʿAffan School in Antakya and moved to Antakya Secondary School in 1936. After the Turks alienated Sanjak of Alexandretta in 1938, Ṣidqi and his brother Adham, and a large number of other Arabs, were forced to cross the border illegally into Syria.

Ṣidqi completed his secondary school education in schools in Hama, Aleppo and Damascus. He obtained his secondary school degree in 1943, and his Dar Al-Muʿalimeen or "House of Scholars" degree in 1948. He enrolled in the Syrian University in Damascus, obtained a bachelor's degree in philosophy and a Diploma in Education 1952, and taught in Damascus and Aleppo. He married in 1957.

== Career ==
Ṣidqi Ismaʿil worked in teaching, moving between primary and secondary schools and the houses of teachers in Aleppo and Damascus until 1967, when he was appointed Secretary of The Supreme Council for Arts, Humanities, and Social Sciences in Damascus. He managed the Arab Writers Union from 1971, and was responsible for the magazine published by the Union, Al-Mawqif Al-Adabi Magazine. He participated in a number of international seminars, conferences, and Arabic Literary Festivals, and visited European countries.

In 1968, he was appointed Secretary to The Supreme Council for Arts, Humanities and Social Sciences. He co-founded the Arab Writers Union and managed it until 1971. He was also the chief literary editor of Al-Mawqif Magazine and a member of the Story and Fiction Association.

Ṣidqi Ismaʿil was a respected artist and a talented writer who stayed true to his beliefs. He started writing when he was in primary school, where he enjoyed reading and studying. During his summer holidays, he designed and edit small magazines using a pen and gave them to his friends. His editing improved as his interest in journalism grew, and after moving from Sanjak to Syria, he founded Al-Majalla Al-Ṭullabiya ("Student Magazine"). He founded Al-Majalla Al-Maghribiya ("The Moroccan Magazine") during the 1950s in celebration of the resistance of Western Arabia; and Majallat Al-Kalb ("The Dog Magazine"), a damascene poetry magazine that he wrote by hand for 20 years and distributed to friends and family.

== Arab Nationalism ==
Arab Nationalism was the first Arab cause that Ṣidqi Ismaʿil became interested in, after attending lectures given by Zaki Al-Arsozi in the Arabism Club in Antakya, and he was obsessed with it throughout his life . He became part of the battle for the Arabism of Sanjak of Alexandretta, and he encouraged his peers to participate in the national movement led by Al-Arsozi. He was shot by soldiers in a protest in 1973 and was in hospital for two months.

The Battle of Sanjak ended with the alienation of Sanjak from its native land, and Ṣidqi Ismaʿil departed from his motherland to Syria, where he continued fighting and resisting for his principles and for his native land and people. The Arabism he believed in became a part of his existence. With his pen, he addressed all the things that were standing in the way of the progression of the Arab World, and he wrote about the battles that the Arab World was fighting in the East and the West: from Sanjak to the Evacuation of the French Mandates to Palestine; the West Sahara revolutions, especially the Algerian revolution, the Suez Crisis, the Unity and Separation, and the 1963 Syrian coup d'état.

He was not interested in the act of writing: he saw writing as a tool to be used to address and fight political battles. He felt that the only everlasting aspect of a nation was its culture; and that culture, not politics, was what united its people. He believed that the Arab Ba'ath Movement would lead to Pan-Arabism, of which he was an active supporter, having been a member of the Founding Congress of the Ba'ath Party in April 1947. He continued as a member of the party for 15 years, and his loyalties remained with the party for his entire life. He edited the Al-Ba'ath weekly newspaper until 1958, before moving to writing in the daily Al-Jamaheer Newspaper. He died at the peak of his literary and intellectual career.

== Intellectual influence ==
Ṣidqi Ismaʿil wrote articles, stories, novels, plays, and poetry. His bibliography was published in six volumes by the Ministry of Culture and National Guidance in Syria between 1977 and 1983. Unpublished manuscripts found after his death were greater in volume than his published work. Most of his writings represented the Arab situation and its national and humanitarian aspects. His literary writings were influenced by the philosophy he studied, for he believed that philosophy was a part of existence, whereas literature was existence itself. He believed that literature, its proceedings and its notable texts, were what formed nations, especially Arab nations.

Ṣidqi Ismaʿil believed that history was not simply a chronicling of events that, once occurred, would not occur again: instead, it was the past existing in and influencing the present life of the nation. This presence consisted of nationalism inherited from Pre-Abrahamic religions, the Islamic breakthroughs, and grief for the past,

He wrote about the Arab reality from his experiences, and stayed true to the conclusions he came to. His written thoughts included "Al-Yanabeeʿ" or "The Fountains" (1954), an article published in the Beirut Journal of Arts, in which he discussed the Arab definition of freedom. "Ancient Arabs were wise in that they were free. They practised their freedom without thinking or talking about it, unlike people today. They believed that freedom was an act and an experience similar to a flowing fountain ... or an eagle soaring in the heavens".

In his book "Mohammad ʿAli Al-Qabisi: Founder of The Tunisian Movement" or "Mohammad ʿAli Al-Qabisi: Mu'asis Al-Ḥaraka Al-Tunisiya" (1955), he studied the starting point of Syndicalism in Tunisia, noting the importance of this movement succeeding, for he believed that it was the core of future of Arab societies. His novel "Al-ʿAṣa". or "The Cane", described successive generations in Syria from the days of the Ottomans to the French Mandates to Syrian Independence from France. The same ideas progressed in his philosophical study "Arabs and Misery" or "Al-ʿArab Wa Tajrobat Al-Ma'asa" (1963), and in his play "The Third Ember" or "Suqooṭ Al-Jamra Al-Thalitha" (1964); also in his short story collection "God and Poverty" or "Allahu Wa Al-Faqr" (1970), and in his manuscript "Al-Mutannabi's Experience" or "Tajrobat Al-Mutannabi", which was published after his death.

== Publications ==
- Humane Incidents or "Mawaqif Insaniya" – Rambo – Van Gogh – Damascus – Alif Baa' Publications – 1978.
- Mohammad ʿAli Al-Qabisi: Founder of The Tunisian Movement or "Mohammad ʿAli Al-Qabisi: Mu'asis Al-Ḥaraka Al-Tunisiya" – Damascus 1955.
- Arabs and Misery or "Al-ʿArab Wa Tajrobat Al-Ma'asa" – Dar Al-Taliʿa: Beirut – 1963.
- The Cane or "Al-ʿAṣa" – Novel – Beirut – Dar Al-Taliʿa – 1964.
- God and Poverty or "Allahu Wa Al-Faqr" – Arab Writers Union – Damascus 1970.
- The Days of Solomon: ʿAmmar Searching for His Father or "Ayyam Solomon: ʿAmmar Yabḥath ʿAan Abeeh" – The Shoes or "Al-Aḥthiya" – The Third Ember or "Suqooṭ Al-Jamra Al-Thalitha" – Love of Al-Maraqash Al-Akbar or "Ḥob Al-Maraqash Al-Akbar" – The Accident or "Al-Ḥaditha" – Plays – Damascus – Alif Baa' Publications – 1981.
- The Complete Works: Six volumes – National Command of The Arab Socialist Ba'ath Party – Damascus 1977.
- The Storm or "Al-Iʿṣar" and other stories – Arabized Pushkin or "Pushkin Taʿrib" – Cairo – Dar Al-Ruwad – 1960.
- Opinions and Ideas on The Path to Pan-Arabism or "Araa' Wa 'Afkar ʿAla Ṭariq Al-Wiḥda Al-ʿArabiya" – Damascus – Arab Writers Union – 1971.
- The Spirit of Forests or "Ruḥ Al-Ghabat" – Anton Chekhov – Revision and introductions – Al-Sharq Library – Aleppo – 1960.
- National Education Textbook – co-authored with Shafiq Al-Nuḥas and Majed Al-Thahabi – Damascus – Ministry of Education – 1959.
- Arab Society or "Al-Mujtamaʿ Al-ʿArabi" – The Population – Health – Education – Co-authored with Antoine Raḥma – Damascus – Ministry of Education – 1975.
- As'ad al-Warak TV series, based on his novel (God and Poverty) or (Allahu Wa Al-Faqr) which was aired in 1975 and reproduced in 2010.
