= Hatay Büyükşehir Belediyesi (women's football) =

Hatay Büyükşehir Belediyesi Gençlik Spor
- Nickname: Hatay BŞB Women
- Ground: Nazım Koka Stadium
- Chairman: Lütfü Savaş
- League: Turkish Women's Football Third League
- Website: http://hataybbspor.com/

Hatay Büyükşehir Belediyesi Women's (Turkish: Hatay Büyükşehir Belediyesi Gençlik Spor) is the women's football section of Hatay Büyükşehir Belediyespor, a major sports club in Hatay, Turkey. The team competes in Turkish Women's Football Third League.

== Statistics ==
| Season | League | Pos | Pld | W | D | L | GF | GA | GD | Pts |
|---|---|---|---|---|---|---|---|---|---|---|
| 2016–17 | Women's Third League – Gr. 7 | 10 | 24 | 6 | 5 | 13 | 40 | 72 | -32 | 23 |
| 2017–18 | Women's Third League – Gr. 10 | 4 | 10 | 4 | 1 | 5 | 13 | 28 | -15 | 13 |
| 2018–19 | Women's Third League – Gr. 10 | 1 | 8 | 6 | 0 | 2 | 41 | 11 | +30 | 12^{^} |
| 2019–20 | Women's Third League – Gr. 7 | 5 | 11 | 5 | 0 | 6 | 30 | 33 | -3 | 15 |
Green marks a season followed by promotion, red a season followed by relegation.

Notes:
^{^} Six penalty points were deducted by the Turkish Football Federation
