= Antakya =

Metropolitan municipality in Turkey

- Municipality and District
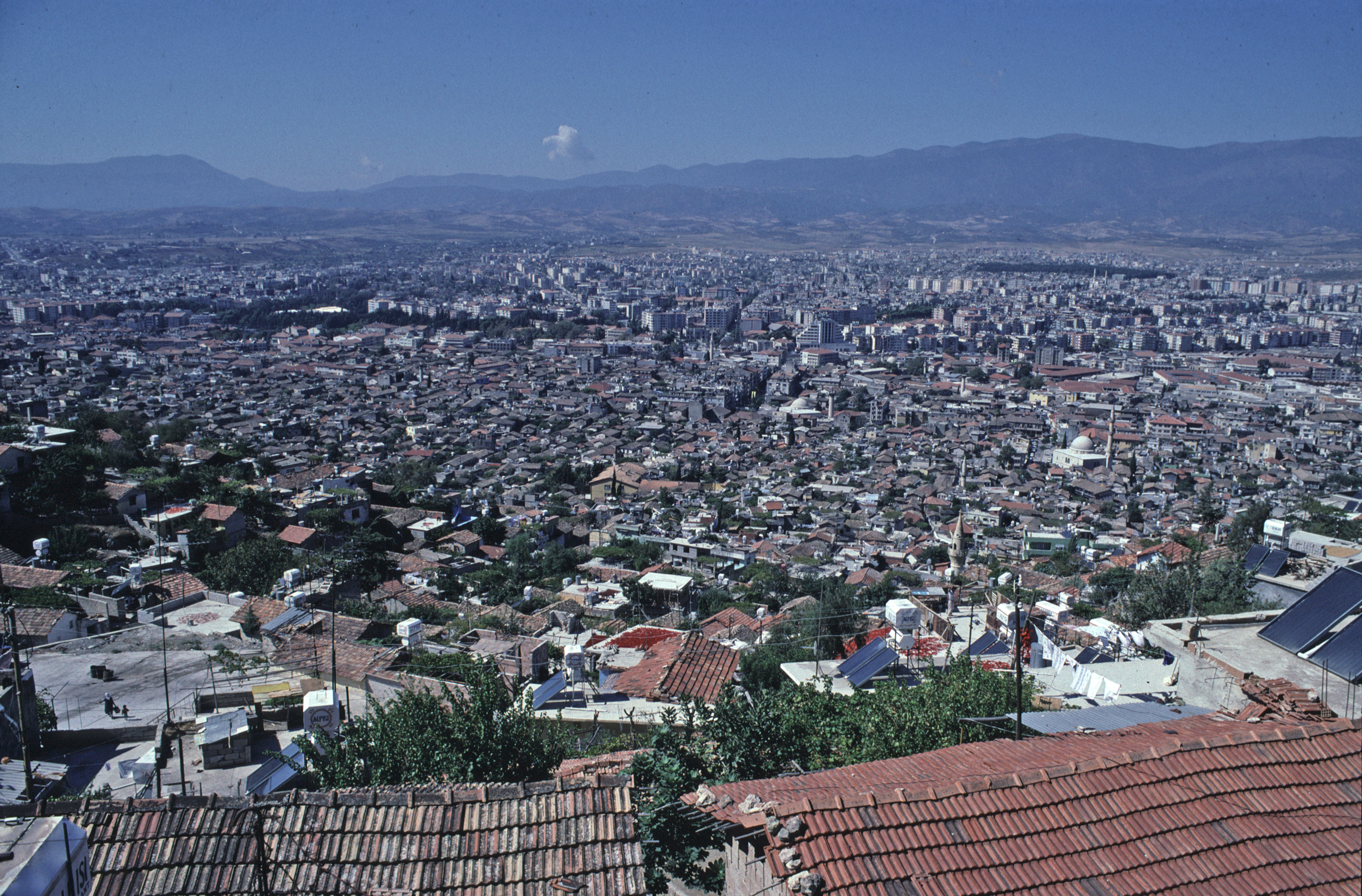
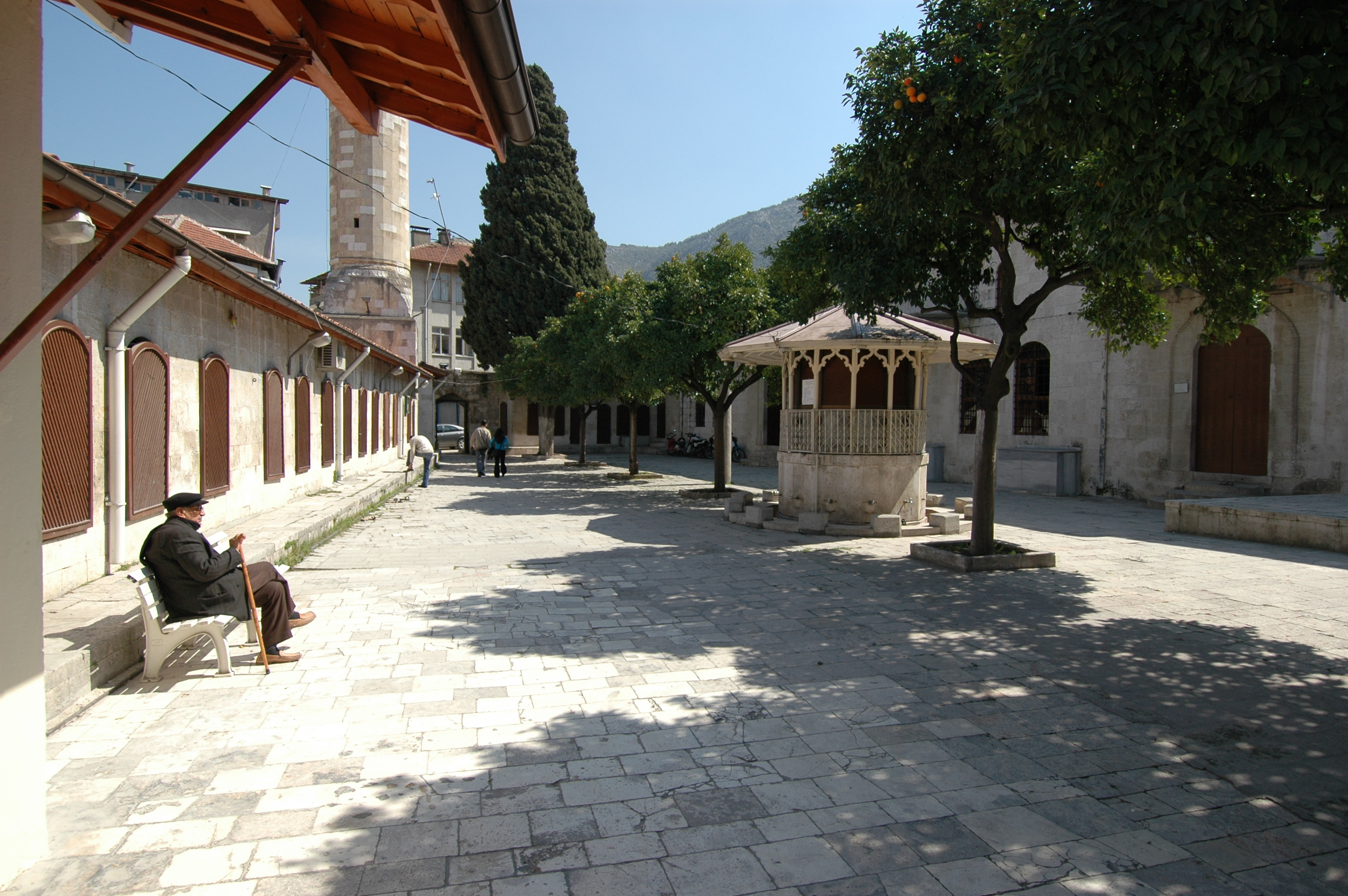
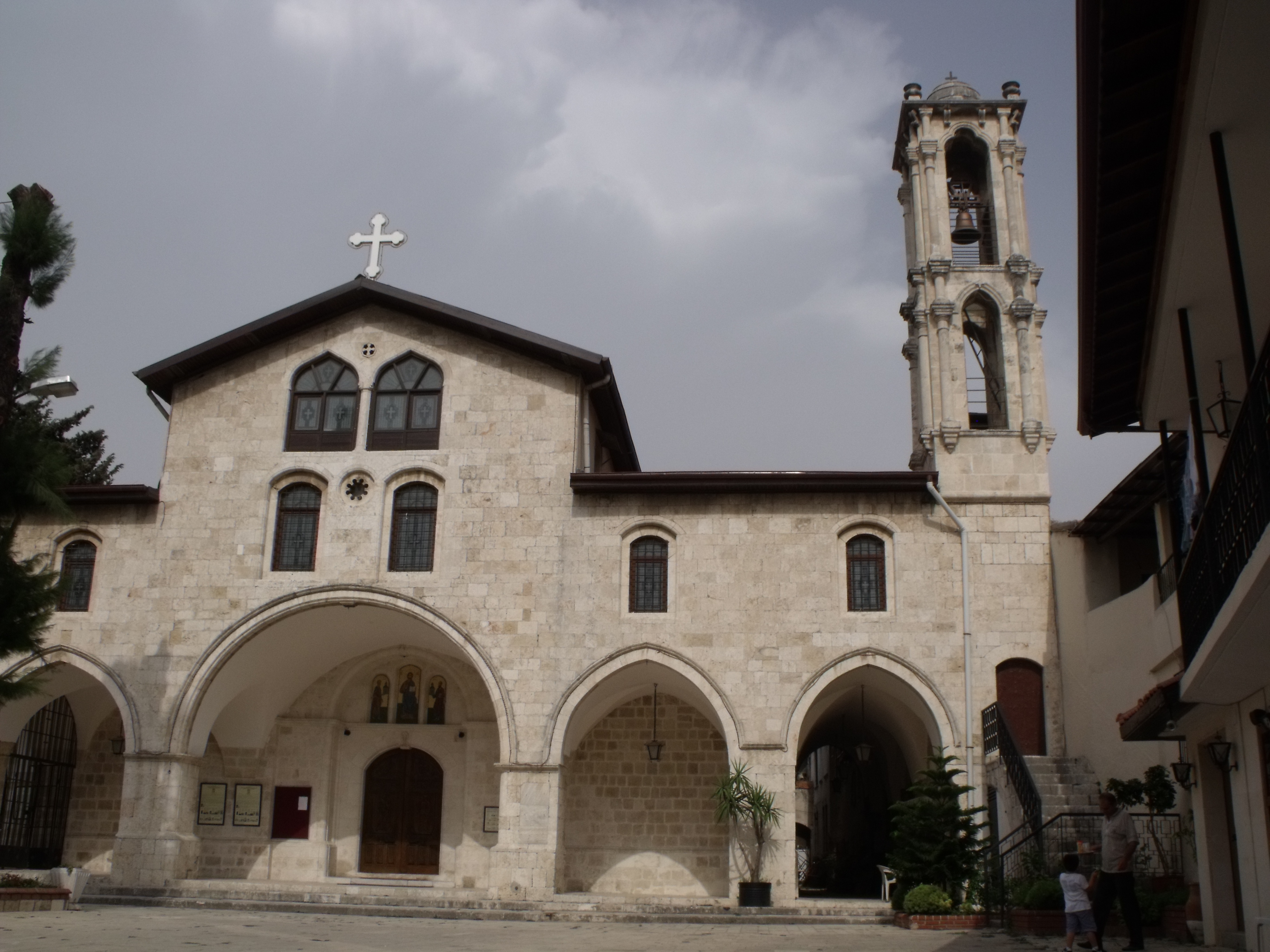
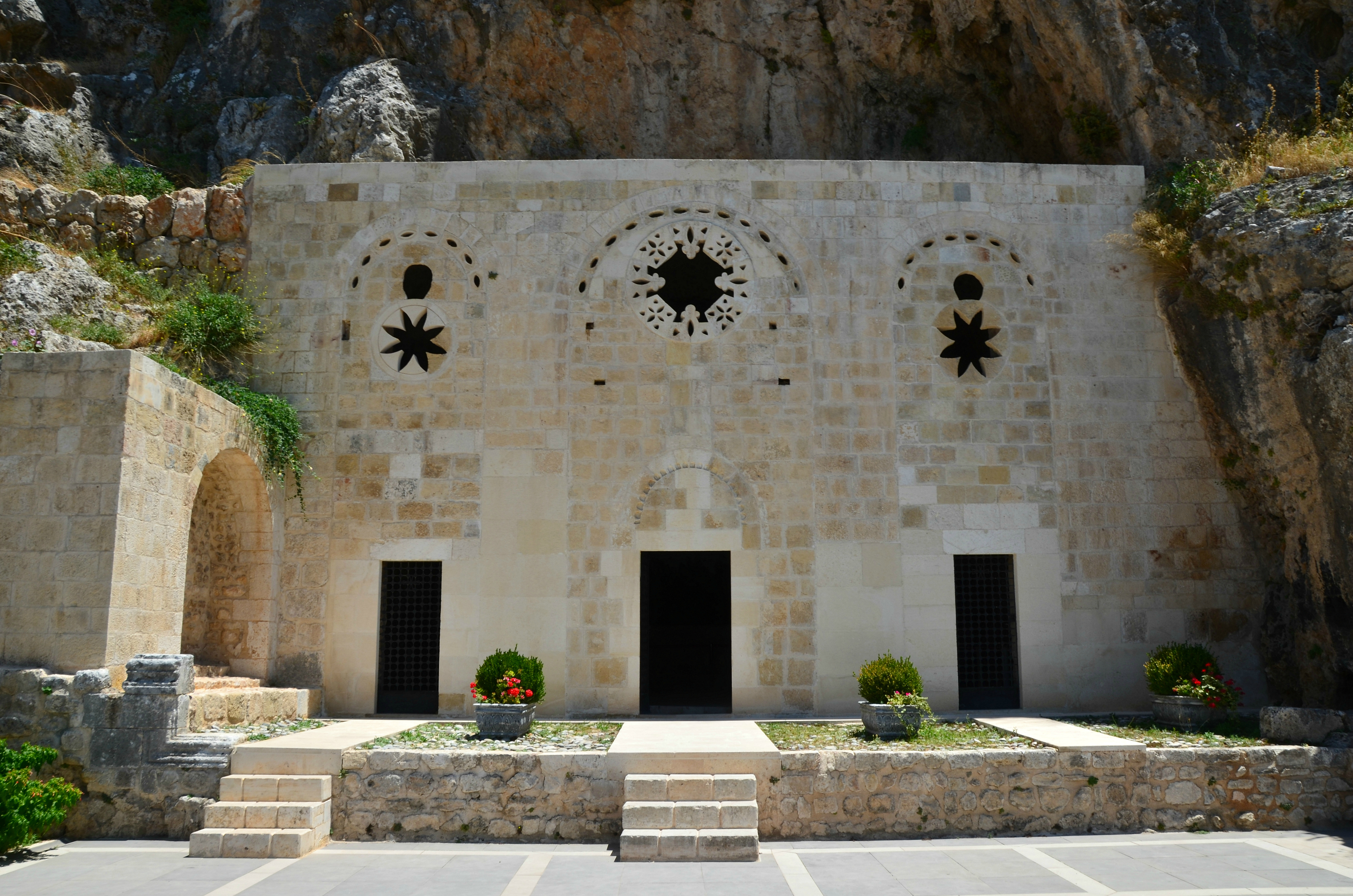
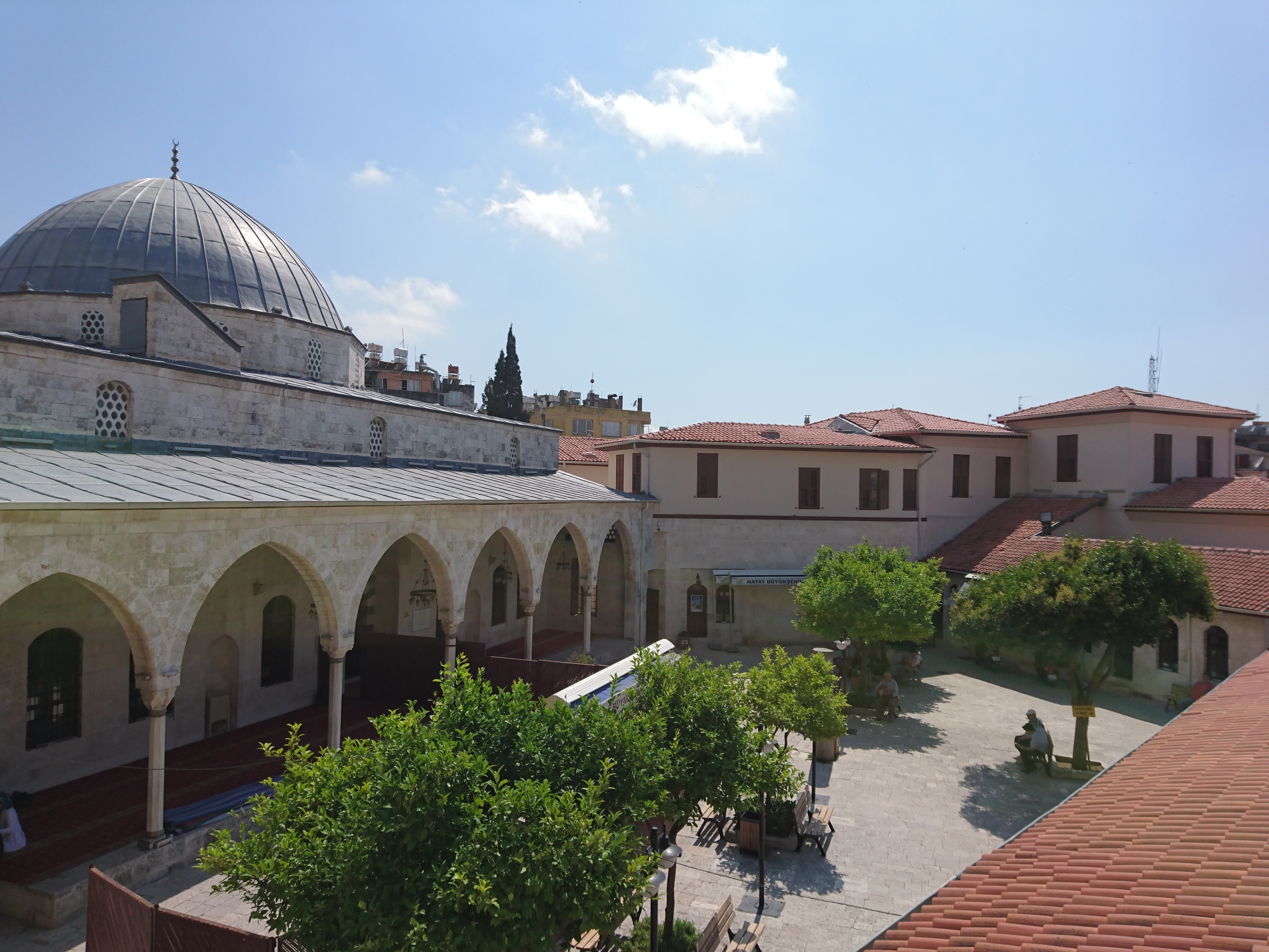
- Clockwise from top: View overlooking Antakya, Saint Paul Church, Habib-i Neccar Mosque, Church of Saint Peter, Antakya Ulu Mosque

- Emblem of Antakya Metropolitan Municipality

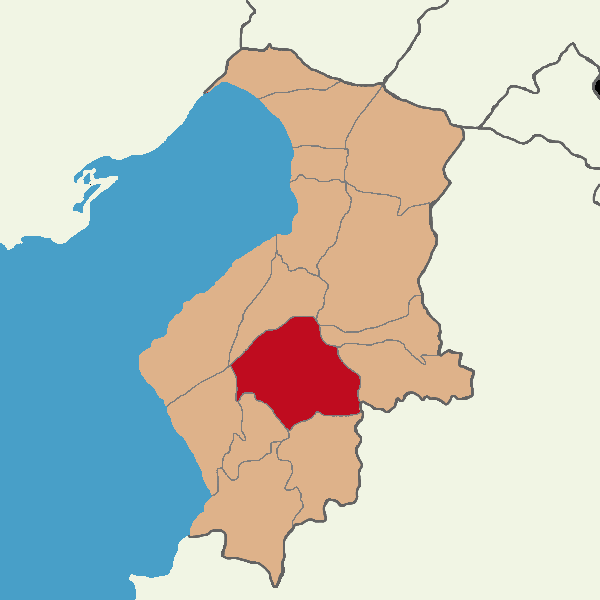
- Map showing Antakya District in Hatay Province

- Location within Turkey
- Coordinates: 36°12′09″N 36°09′38″E
- Country: Turkey
- Region: Mediterranean
- Province: Hatay

Government
  - Mayor: İbrahim Naci Yapar (AKP)

Area
  - Total: 703 km^{2} (271 sq mi)
- Elevation: 67 m (220 ft)

Population (2022)
  - Total: 399,045
- Area code: 0326
- Website: www.antakya.bel.tr

Antakya (Turkish pronunciation: [anˈtakja]), (Note: Local Turkish: Anteke; Arabic: أنطاكية, romanized: ʾAnṭākiya) historically known as Antioch, (Note: Ancient Greek: Ἀντιόχεια, romanized: Antiókheia; Armenian: Անտիոք, romanized: Andiok; Latin: Antiochia) is a municipality and the capital district of Hatay Province, Turkey, with an area of 703 km^{2} (271 sq mi) and a population of around 400,000 people as of 2022. It is in the Hatay Province, which is the southernmost region of Turkey. The city is located in a well-watered and fertile valley on the Orontes River, about 20 kilometres (12 mi) from the Levantine Sea.

Today's city stands partly on the site of the ancient Antiochia (also known as "Antioch on the Orontes"), which was founded in the fourth century BC by the Seleucid Empire. Antioch later became one of the Roman Empire's largest cities and was made the capital of the provinces of Syria and Coele-Syria. It was also an influential early center of Christianity; the New Testament asserts that the name "Christian" first emerged in Antioch. The city gained much ecclesiastical importance during the times of the Byzantine Empire. Captured by Umar ibn al-Khattab in the seventh century AD, the medieval Antakiyah was conquered or re-conquered several times: by the Byzantines in 969, the Seljuks in 1084, the Crusaders in 1098, the Mamluks in 1268, and eventually the Ottomans in 1517, who would integrate it to the Aleppo Eyalet then to the Aleppo Vilayet. The city joined the Hatay State under the French Mandate before joining the Turkish Republic.

On 6 February 2023, the city was heavily damaged by two powerful earthquakes with their epicenter in Kahramanmaraş. Some of the historical sites, including the Church of St Paul, were destroyed. The earthquakes destroyed several neighborhoods in the city and left thousands homeless. The death toll in Hatay Province, which includes Antakya, was estimated at over 20,000.

== History ==
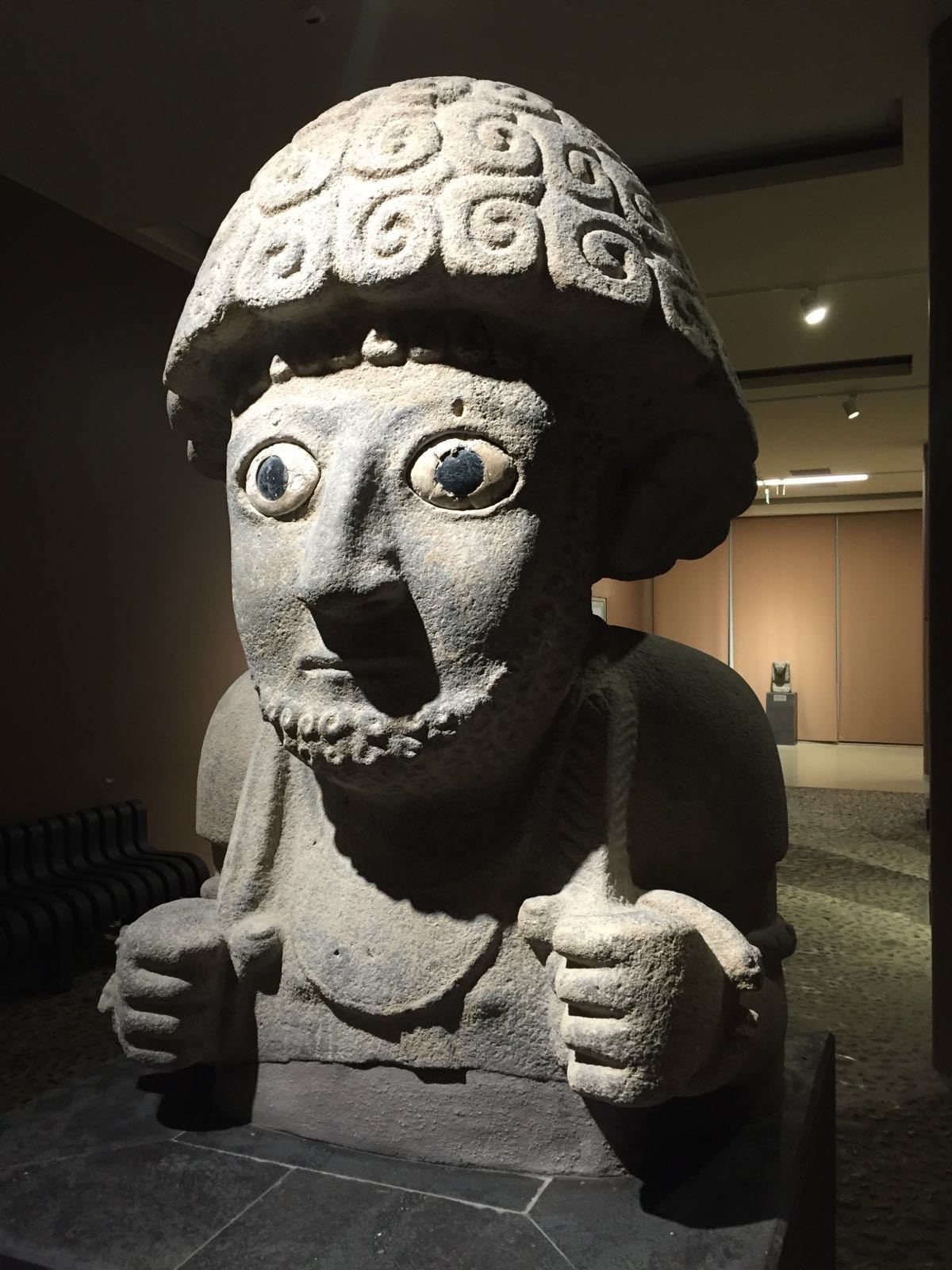
King Šuppiluliuma I in Hatay Archaeology Museum

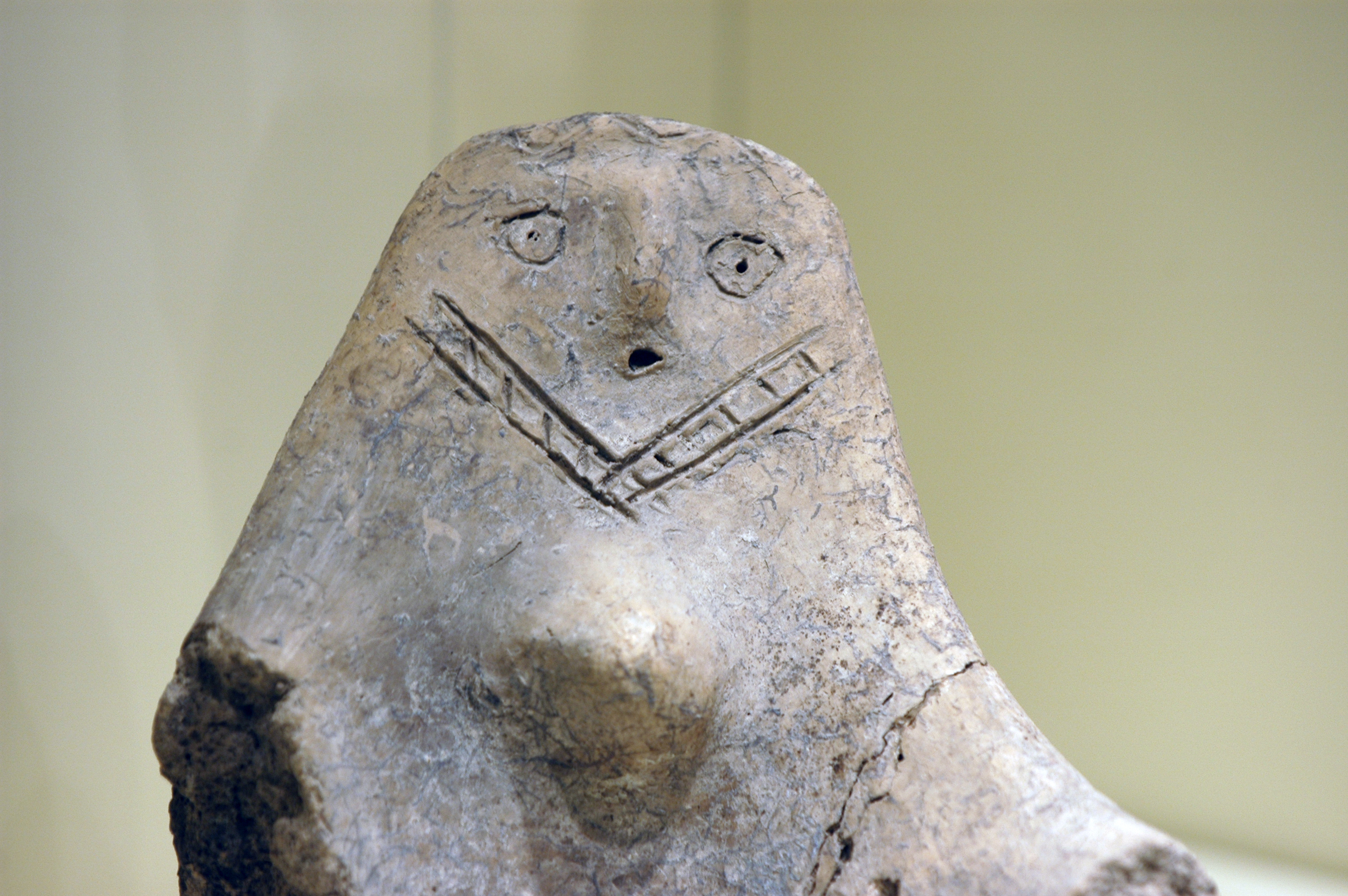
An artifact from the middle and late Bronze Age, 2000–1200 BC in Hatay Archaeology Museum

=== Antiquity ===
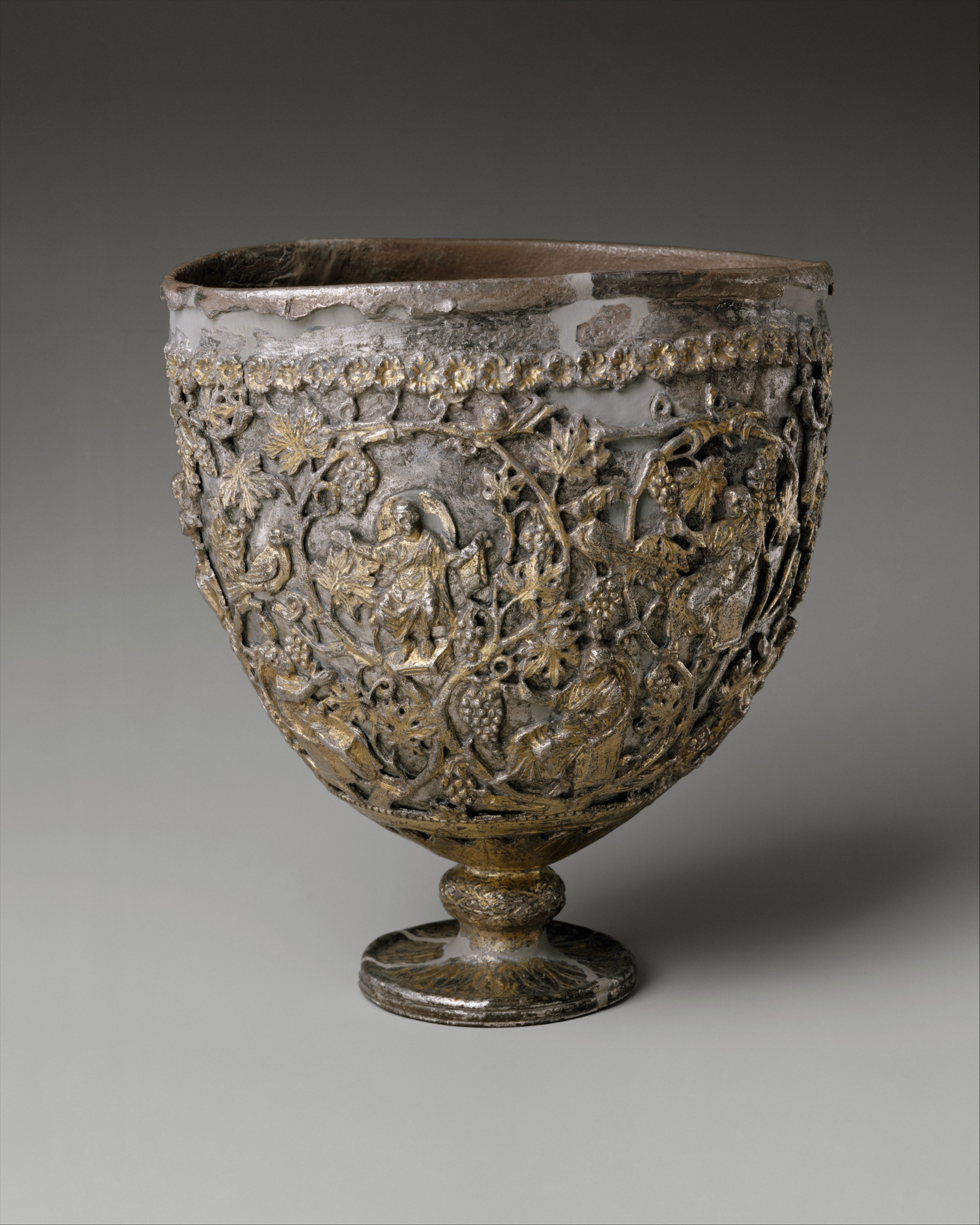
The Antioch chalice, first half of sixth century, Metropolitan Museum of Art

Humans have occupied the area of Antioch since the Chalcolithic period (6th millennium BC), as revealed by archaeological excavations of Alalakh, among others.

The Macedonian King Alexander the Great, after defeating the Achaemenid Empire in the Battle of Issus in 333 BC, followed the Orontes south into Syria and occupied the area. The city of Antioch was founded in 300 BC, after the death of Alexander, by the Seleucid emperor Seleucus I Nicator. It played an important role as one of the largest cities in the Seleucid, Roman, and Byzantine empires. The city swapped hands between the Romans and the Sasanian Empire in the 3rd century. It was the battleground for the siege of Antioch (253) when Shapur I defeated the Roman army and the later Battle of Antioch (613) where the Persians were successful at capturing the city for the last time. It was a key city during the early history of Christianity, in particular that of the Syriac Orthodox Church, the Antiochian Orthodox Church and the Maronite Church, as well as during the spread of Islam and the Crusades.

=== Biblical era ===
Acts 11:26: "So it was that for an entire year they met with the church and taught a great many people, and it was in Antioch that the disciples were first called 'Christians.'"

=== Rashidun period ===
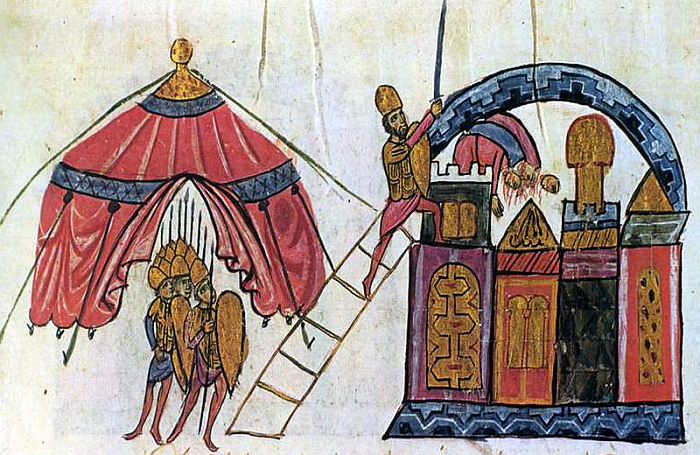
Recapture of Antioch in 969

In 637, during the reign of the Byzantine emperor Heraclius, Antioch was conquered by the Rashidun Caliphate during the Battle of the Iron Bridge. The city became known in Arabic as أنطاكية (ʾAnṭākiya). Since the Umayyad Caliphate was unable to penetrate the Anatolian plateau, Antioch found itself on the frontline of the conflicts between two hostile empires during the next 350 years, so that the city went into a precipitous decline. After the demise of Umayyad rule, Antioch became part of the Abbasid empire (except for a brief rule of the Tulunids), Ikhshidids and Hamdanids.

In 969, the city was reconquered for the Byzantine Emperor Nikephoros II Phokas by Michael Bourtzes and the stratopedarches Peter. It soon became the seat of a dux, who commanded the forces of the local themes and was the most important officer on the Empire's eastern border, held by such men as Nikephoros Ouranos. In 1078, Philaretos Brachamios, an Armenian hero, seized power. He held the city until the Seljuk Turks captured it from him in 1084. The Sultanate of Rum held it only fourteen years before the Crusaders arrived.

=== Crusader era ===
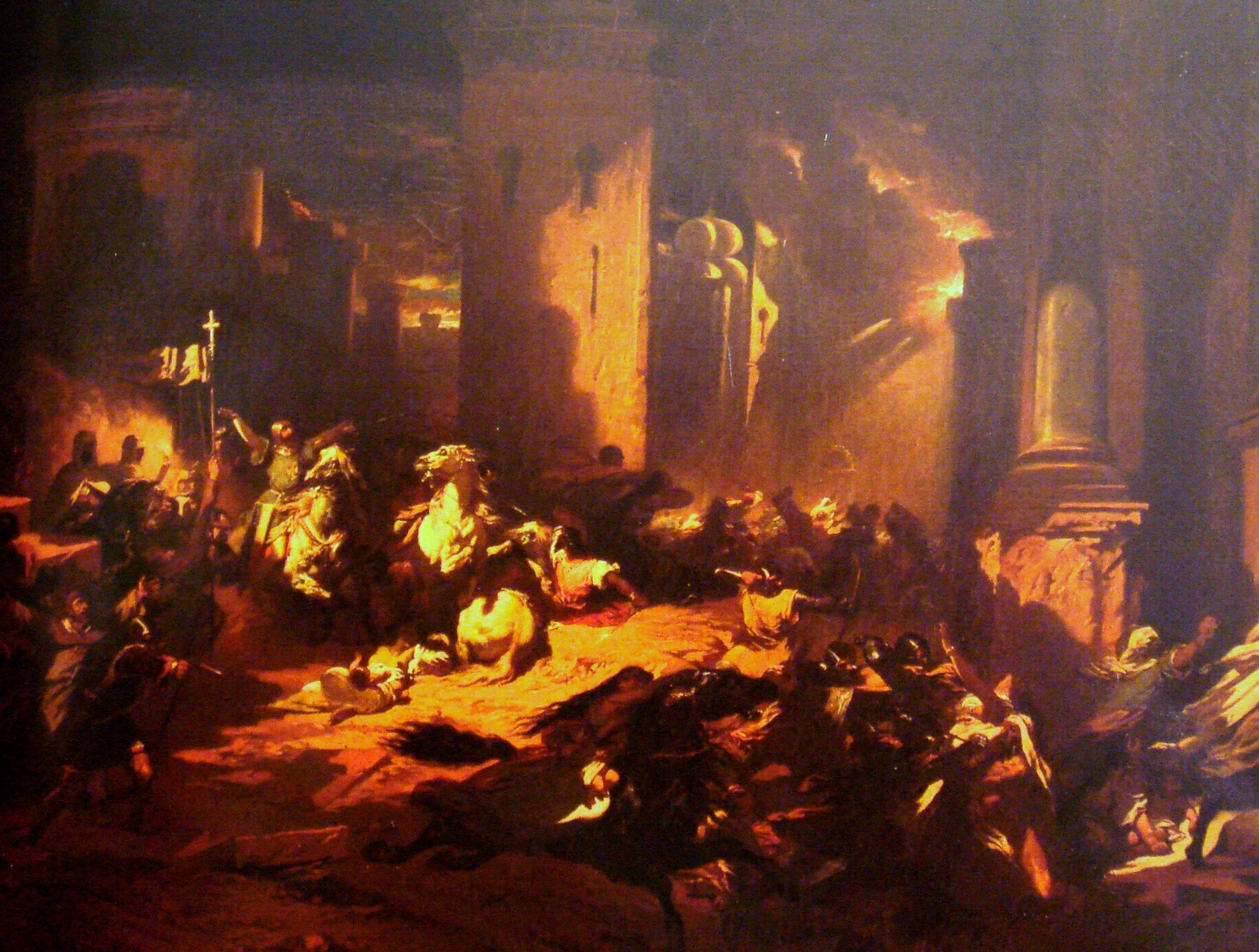
Capture of Antioch by Louis Gallait

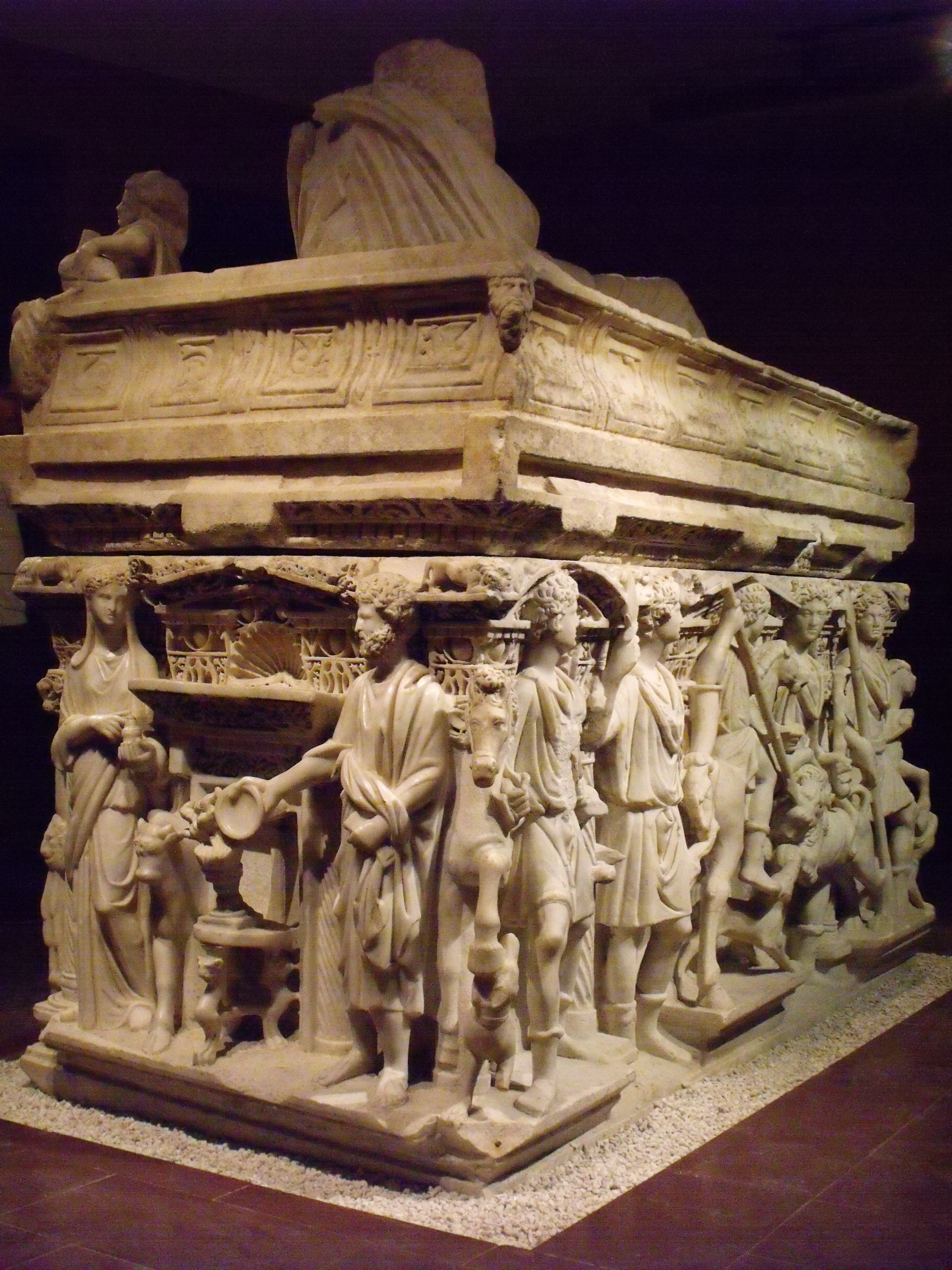
Roman sarcophagi in Hatay Archaeology Museum

The Crusaders' Siege of Antioch between October 1097 and June 1098 during the First Crusade resulted in its fall. The Crusaders caused significant damage, including a massacre of its population, both Christian and Muslim. Following the defeat of Seljuk forces arriving to break the siege only four days after its capture by the crusaders, Bohemond I became its overlord. It remained the capital of the Latin Principality of Antioch for nearly two centuries.

In 1268, it fell to the Mamluk sultan Baybars after another siege. Baybars proceeded to massacre the Christian population. The massacre of men, women, and children at Antioch "was the single greatest massacre of the entire crusading era." Priests had their throats slit inside their churches, and women were sold into slavery.

In addition to suffering the ravages of war, the city lost its commercial importance because trade routes to East Asia moved north following the Mongol invasions of the Levant.

Antioch never recovered as a major city, and much of its former role fell to the port of Alexandretta. The diary of the English naval chaplain Henry Teonge records an account of both cities in 1675.

=== Ottoman city ===
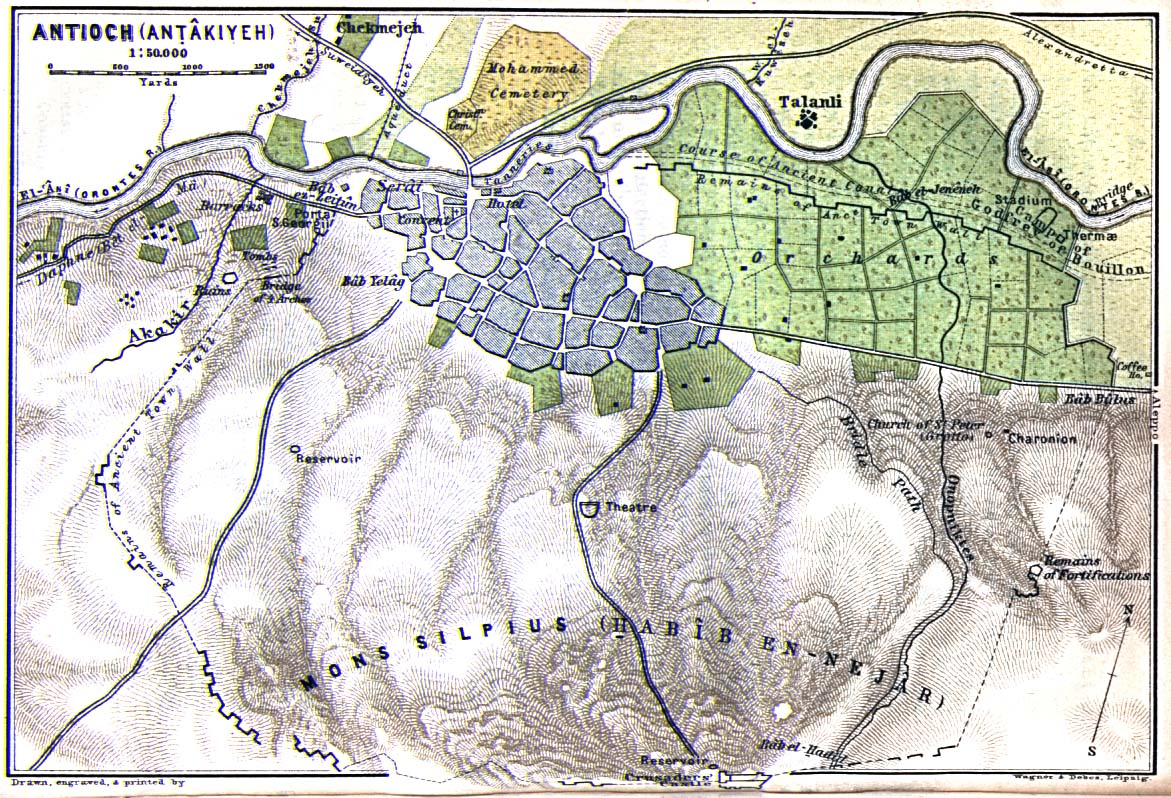
Densely built Antakya in 1912: the traditional Muslim city shows no trace of its Hellenistic planning. To the east, orchards (green) fill the plain.

The city was initially the centre of Antakya sanjak, which was part of the Damascus Eyalet. It was later the center of the sanjak of Antakya in Aleppo Eyalet. It was finally the kaza of the Aleppo Sanjak, part of the Aleppo vilayet.

In 1822 (and again in 1872), Antakya was hit by an earthquake and damaged. When Egyptian general Ibrahim Pasha established his headquarters in the city in 1835, it had only some 5,000 inhabitants. Supporters hoped the city might develop thanks to the Euphrates Valley Railway, which was supposed to link it to the port of is-Swēda (Levantine Arabic: السويدية, now Samandağ), but this plan never came to fruition. This scheme is the subject of Letitia Elizabeth Landon's poem Antioch. (1836) in which she reflects of the superiority of trade and commerce over war and conflict. The city suffered repeated outbreaks of cholera due to inadequate infrastructure for sanitation. Later the city developed and rapidly resumed much of its old importance when a railway was built along the lower Orontes valley.

=== French Mandate and Turkish annexation ===
Antioch was part of the Sanjak of Alexandretta during the Mandate for Syria and the Lebanon, until it was made Hatay State in 1938 after Turkish pressure. An Arab nationalist newspaper in the city run by Zaki al-Arsuzi was shut down by the Turks. On 30 May 1938, an Arab was killed during a riot by a Turkish crowd. On 7 July 1938, the Turkish army entered Antioch. The annexation of the Hatay State by Turkey in 1939, creating Hatay Province, caused an exodus of Christians and Alawites from Antioch east to the French Mandate.

The district of Antakya was created in 2013 from part of the former central district of Hatay.

== Demographics ==
=== Language ===
A British traveller visiting Antakya in 1798 reported that generally, Turkish was spoken, while, by contrast, the prevalent language in Aleppo at the time was Arabic. Most Alawites and Armenians spoke Turkish as a second language.

=== Religion ===
In 1935, Turkish and Arab Muslims made more than 80% of the population.

Census of 1935
Religion	Population (Percentage)
Sunni Islam	19,720 (58%)
Alawism	8,670 (25.5%)
Christianity	4,930 (14.5%)
Others	680 (2%)
Total	34,000 (100%)

Antakya was home to one of the most ancient Jewish communities for over 2200 years.

== Recent history ==
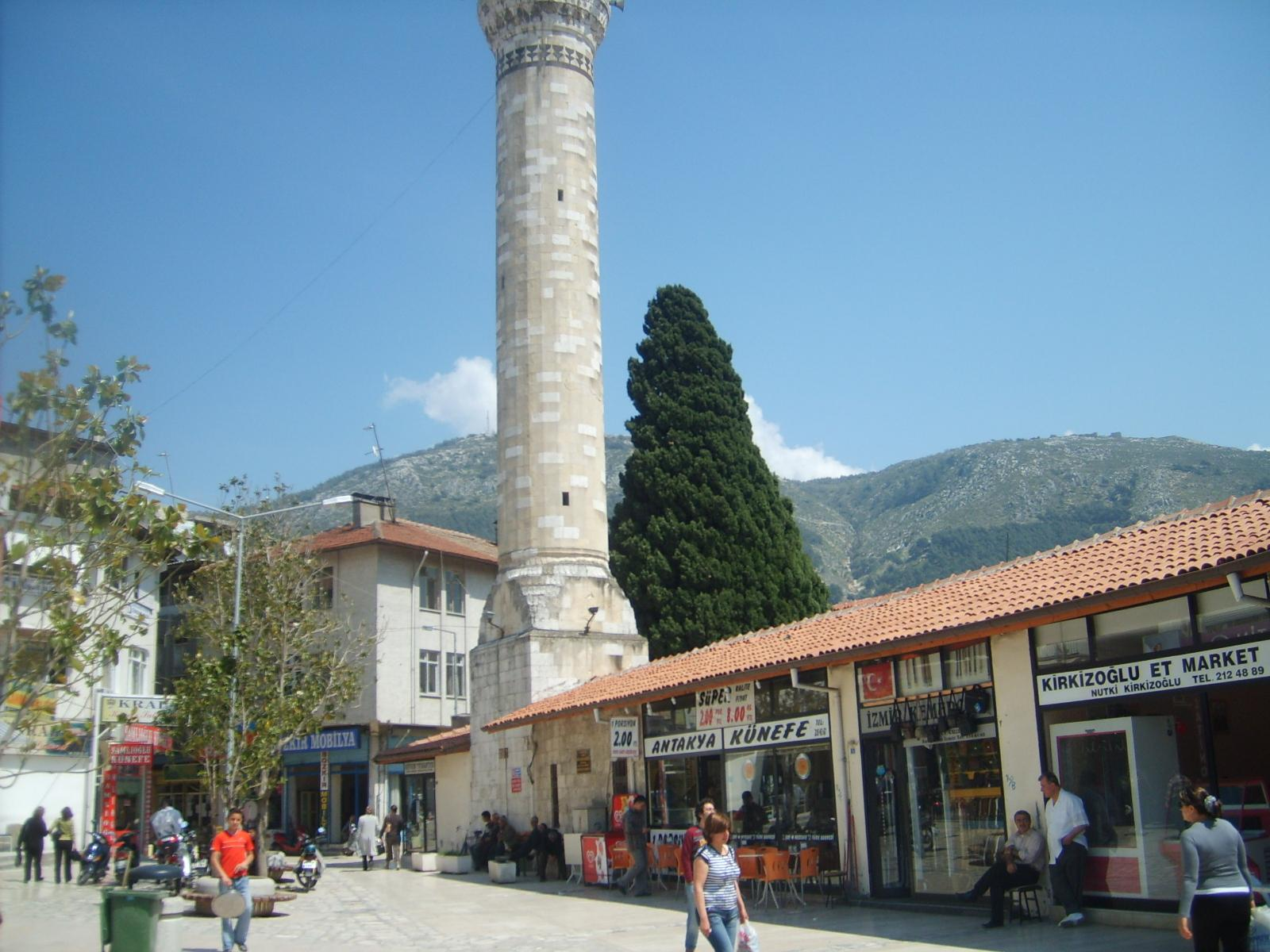
The marketplace in central Antakya

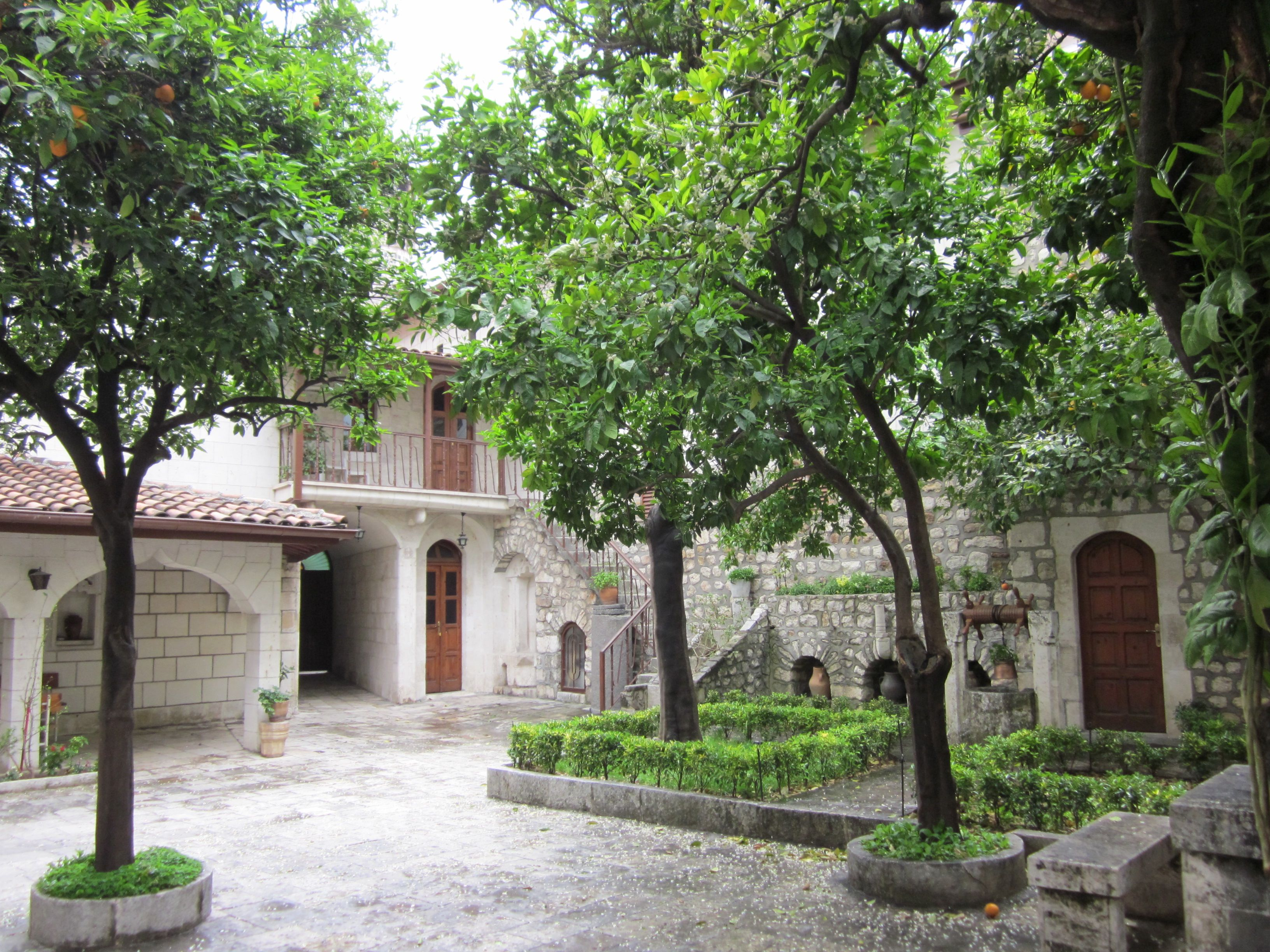
Courtyard of the Church of Apostles Peter and Paul in Antakya

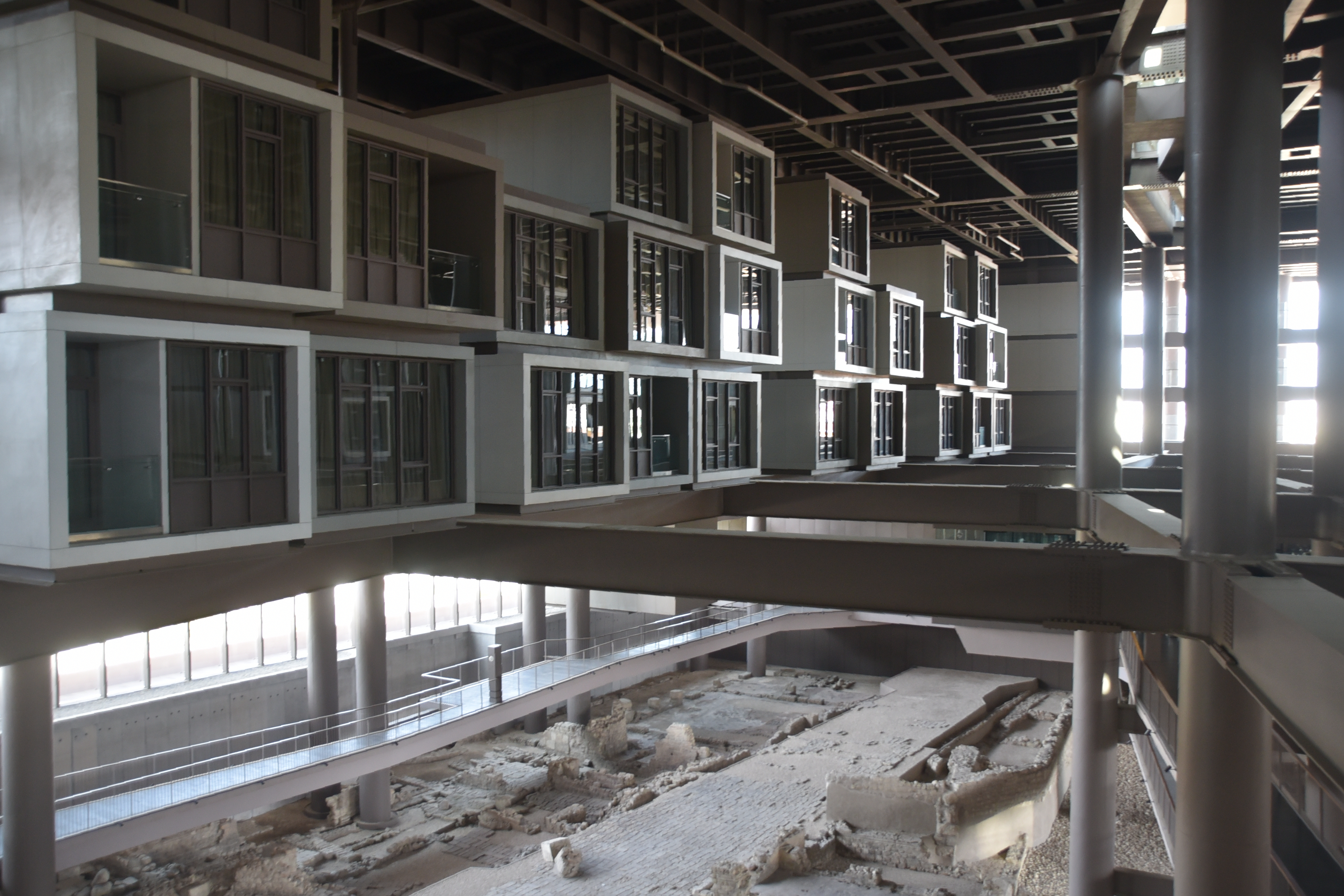
The Museum Hotel Antakya opened in 2020. A 9,000 square-foot Roman mosaic is displayed inside the hotel.

Mount Habib-i Neccar and the city walls which climb the hillsides symbolise Antakya, making the city a formidable fortress built on a series of hills running north-east to south-west. Antakya was originally centred on the east bank of the river. Since the 19th century, the city has expanded with new neighbourhoods built on the plains across the river to the south-west, and four bridges connect the old and new cities. Many of the buildings of the last two decades are styled as concrete blocks, and Antakya has lost much of its classic beauty. The narrow streets of the old city can become clogged with traffic.

Antakya is a provincial capital of considerable importance as the centre of a large district. The draining of Lake Amik and development of land have caused the region's economy to grow in wealth and productivity. The town is a lively shopping and business centre with many restaurants, cinemas and other amenities. This district is centred on a large park opposite the governor's building and the central avenue Kurtuluş Caddesı. The tea gardens, cafes and restaurants in the neighbourhood of Harbiye are popular destinations, particularly for the variety of meze in the restaurants. The Orontes River can be malodorous when water is low in summer. Rather than formal nightlife, in the summer heat, people will stay outside until late at the night to walk with their families and friends, and munch on snacks.

Its location near the Syrian border makes Antakya more cosmopolitan than many cities in Turkey. It did not attract the mass immigration of people from eastern Anatolia in the 1980s and 1990s that radically swelled the populations of Mediterranean cities such as Adana and Mersin. Both Turkish and Arabic are still widely spoken in Antakya, although written Arabic is rarely used. A mixed community of faiths and denominations co-exist peacefully here. While almost all the inhabitants are Sunni Muslim, a substantial proportion adhere to the Alevi and Alawite traditions of Islam, in "Harbiye" there is a place to honour the saint Hızır. Numerous tombs of saints, of both Sunni and Alawite, are located throughout the city. Several small Christian communities are active in the city, with the largest church being St. Peter and St. Paul on Hürriyet Avenue. With its long history of spiritual and religious movements, Antakya is a place of pilgrimage for Christians. The Jewish community of Antakya had shrunk to 14 members in 2014. In 2023, the last Jew in the city announced that he was leaving the city after a devastating earthquake.

It has a reputation in Turkey as a place for spells, fortune telling, miracles and spirits. Local crafts include a soap scented with the oil of bay tree.

=== 2023 earthquakes ===
Satellite image of Antakya before and after the earthquake

On 6 February 2023, Antakya suffered heavy damage as a result of a major earthquake. Many parts of the city were totally destroyed. As of 7 February, the BBC reported that at least 1,200 buildings in the city center and the districts of Kırıkhan and İskenderun were razed. Officials said "almost all" houses in the Cebrail District had collapsed. Many historical sites, including churches and mosques, were destroyed, St. Paul's Church being one of them. The historic Antakya Synagogue and Hatay State Assembly Building were also destroyed.

In the aftermath, Turkish president Recep Tayyip Erdoğan pledged an immediate reconstruction of the affected areas if elected for second term. During a visit to the city in September 2023, The New York Times reported that heavily damaged buildings were still being demolished and no large-scale reconstruction works were observed. Many damaged buildings remained standing but abandoned while survivors continue to live in tents. Hatay's mayor, Lütfü Savaş, said only half of the estimated 38,000 buildings registered to be dismantled had been fulfilled. In Gülderen, there were ongoing works to build 2,300 apartment units in 122 blocks.

== Geography ==
Antakya is located on the banks of the Orontes River (Turkish: Asi Nehri), approximately 22 km (14 mi) inland from the Mediterranean coast. The city is in a valley surrounded by mountains, the Nur Mountains (ancient Amanos) to the northwest and Mount Keldağ (Jebel Akra) to the south, with the 440 m high Mount Habib-i Neccar (the ancient Mount Silpius) forming its eastern limits. The mountains are a source of a green marble. Antakya is at the northern edge of the Dead Sea Rift and vulnerable to earthquakes.

The plain of Amik to the north-east of the city is fertile soil watered by the Orontes, the Karasu and the Afrin rivers; the lake in the plain was drained in 1980 by a French company. At the same time channels were built to widen the Orontes and let it pass neatly through the city centre. The Orontes is joined in Antakya by the Hacı Kürüş stream to the north-east of the city near the church of St Peter, and the Hamşen which runs down from Habib-i Neccar to the south-west, under Memekli Bridge near the army barracks. Flora includes the bay trees and myrtle.

=== Composition ===
There are 95 neighbourhoods in Antakya District:

- Açıkdere
- Akasya
- Akçaova
- Akcurun
- Akevler
- Akhisar
- Aksaray
- Alaattin
- Alahan
- Alazı
- Altınçay
- Anayazı
- Apaydın
- Arpahan
- Aşağıoba
- Avsuyu
- Aydınlıkevler
- Bağrıyanık
- Barbaros
- Biniciler
- Bitiren
- Boşin
- Bozhüyük
- Büyükdalyan
- Cebrail
- Cumhuriyet
- Demirköprü
- Derince
- Dikmece
- Doğanköy
- Dutdibi
- Ekinci
- Emek
- Esenlik
- Esentepe
- Fevziçakmak
- Gazi
- Gazipaşa
- General Şükrü Kanatlı
- Gökçegöz
- Gülderen
- Güllübahçe
- Günyazı
- Güzelburç
- Habib-i Neccar
- Hacı Ömer Alpagot
- Haraparası
- Hasanlı
- Havuzlar
- İplik Pazarı
- Kantara
- Karaali
- Karaalibölüğü
- Kardeşler
- Karlısu
- Kisecik
- Kışla Saray
- Kocaabdi
- Küçükdalyan
- Kuruyer
- Kuyulu
- Kuzeytepe
- Madenboyu
- Mansurlu
- Maraşboğazı
- Maşuklu
- Melekli
- Meydan
- Narlıca
- Odabaşı
- Oğlakören
- Orhanlı
- Ovakent
- Paşaköy
- Saçaklı
- Saraycık
- Saraykent
- Şehitler
- Serinyol
- Şeyhali
- Şirince
- Sofular
- Suvatlı
- Tahtaköprü
- Tanışma
- Üçgedik
- Ulucami
- Ürgenpaşa
- Üzümdalı
- Uzunaliç
- Yaylacık
- Yenicami
- Yeşilova
- Zenginler
- Zülüflühan

=== Climate ===
Antakya's climate is classified as hot-summer Mediterranean (Köppen: Csa) or dry-summer humid subtropical (Trewartha: Cf or wet Cs). The city experiences hot, dry summers, and mild, wet winters; though its higher altitude allows for lower temperatures than the coast.

Highest recorded temperature:45.2 °C (113.4 °F) on 13 August 2023
Lowest recorded temperature:−11.8 °C (10.8 °F) on 14 January 1950

Climate data for Antakya (1991–2020, extremes 1940–2023)
Month	Jan	Feb	Mar	Apr	May	Jun	Jul	Aug	Sep	Oct	Nov	Dec	Year
Record high °C (°F)	20.5 (68.9)	26.6 (79.9)	30.5 (86.9)	37.5 (99.5)	42.5 (108.5)	43.2 (109.8)	44.6 (112.3)	45.2 (113.4)	43.5 (110.3)	39.2 (102.6)	32.5 (90.5)	25.1 (77.2)	45.2 (113.4)
Mean daily maximum °C (°F)	12.5 (54.5)	14.9 (58.8)	19.0 (66.2)	23.0 (73.4)	27.0 (80.6)	29.7 (85.5)	31.6 (88.9)	32.5 (90.5)	31.4 (88.5)	28.2 (82.8)	20.3 (68.5)	13.9 (57.0)	23.7 (74.7)
Daily mean °C (°F)	8.2 (46.8)	9.9 (49.8)	13.6 (56.5)	17.4 (63.3)	21.6 (70.9)	25.1 (77.2)	27.6 (81.7)	28.3 (82.9)	26.1 (79.0)	21.5 (70.7)	14.3 (57.7)	9.5 (49.1)	18.6 (65.5)
Mean daily minimum °C (°F)	5.0 (41.0)	5.9 (42.6)	9.1 (48.4)	12.6 (54.7)	16.9 (62.4)	21.3 (70.3)	24.4 (75.9)	25.2 (77.4)	21.7 (71.1)	16.2 (61.2)	9.8 (49.6)	6.2 (43.2)	14.5 (58.1)
Record low °C (°F)	−11.8 (10.8)	−6.8 (19.8)	−4.2 (24.4)	1.5 (34.7)	7.7 (45.9)	11.6 (52.9)	15.9 (60.6)	15.4 (59.7)	7.9 (46.2)	2.3 (36.1)	−3.0 (26.6)	−6.6 (20.1)	−11.8 (10.8)
Average precipitation mm (inches)	198.4 (7.81)	165.2 (6.50)	142.9 (5.63)	101.9 (4.01)	80.9 (3.19)	30.9 (1.22)	16.0 (0.63)	17.5 (0.69)	41.6 (1.64)	76.6 (3.02)	99.6 (3.92)	182.0 (7.17)	1,154.2 (45.44)
Average precipitation days	15.11	13.21	13.17	8.98	5.54	2.15	0.6	0.64	3.35	7.2	8.93	13.5	92.4
Average relative humidity (%)	74.0	69.9	67.4	67.1	66.7	67.3	69.7	69.9	66.0	64.0	66.5	74.8	68.6
Mean monthly sunshine hours	98.7	125.0	181.4	215.6	281.8	324.9	340.7	313.1	269.8	214.5	148.2	96.3	2,610.1
Mean daily sunshine hours	3.4	4.6	6.0	7.3	9.1	10.7	11.1	10.3	9.2	7.0	5.0	3.3	7.3
Source 1: Turkish State Meteorological Service
Source 2: NOAA (humidity, sun 1991-2020)

== Education ==
Mustafa Kemal University, abbreviated as MKU, has several faculties including Engineering and Medicine, while having a campus called Tayfur Sökmen located in Serinyol district 15 km (9.3 mi), north of Antakya (centrum). Established in 1992, currently more than 32,000 students enrolled at the university.

Besides the campus in Serinyol, MKU has its faculties spread out in all main districts of the province including Altınözü, Antakya, Belen, Dörtyol, Erzin, Hassa, İskenderun, Kırıkhan, Reyhanlı, Samandağ and Yayladağı.

== Main sights ==
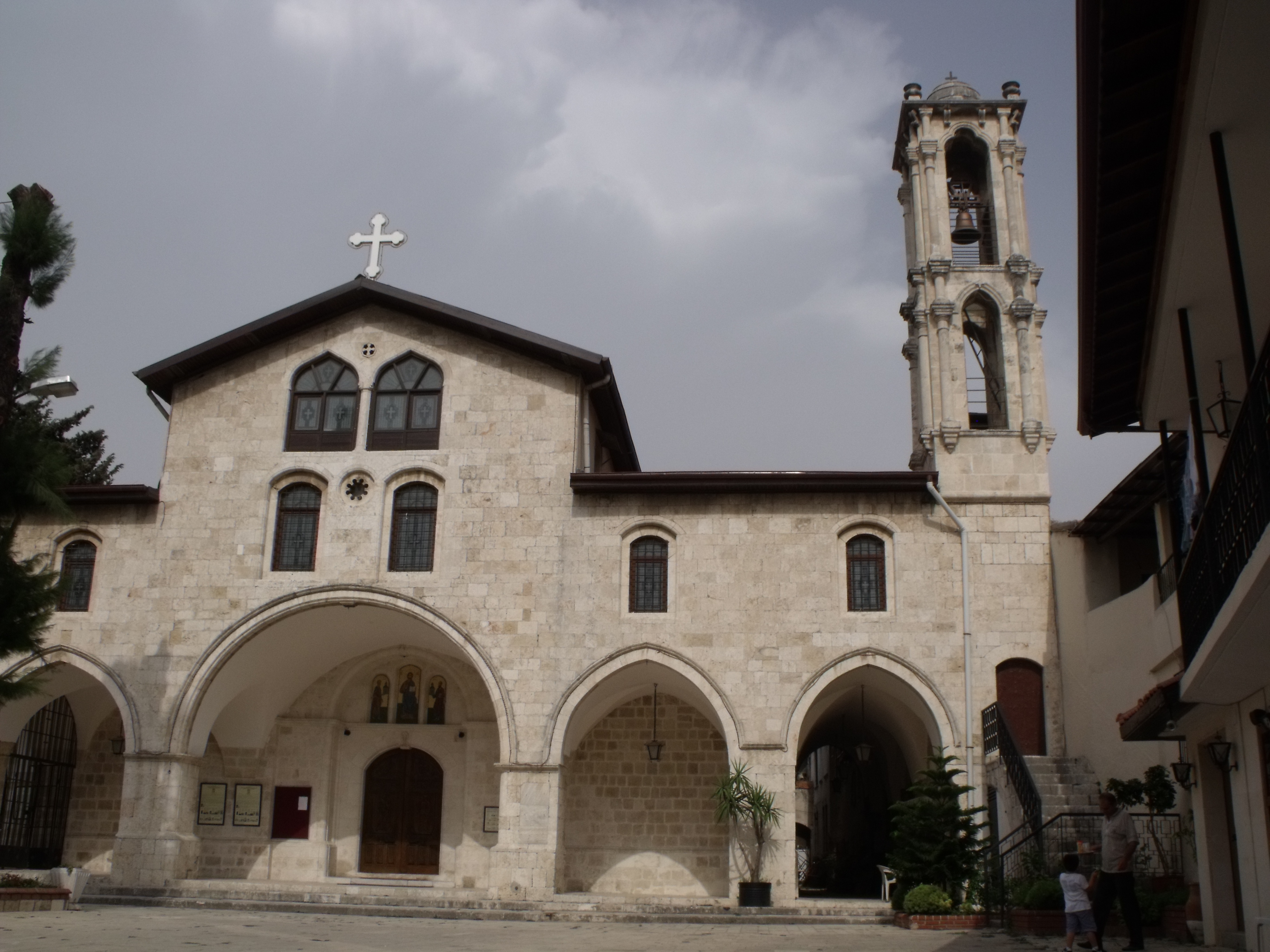
St. Paul Orthodox Church

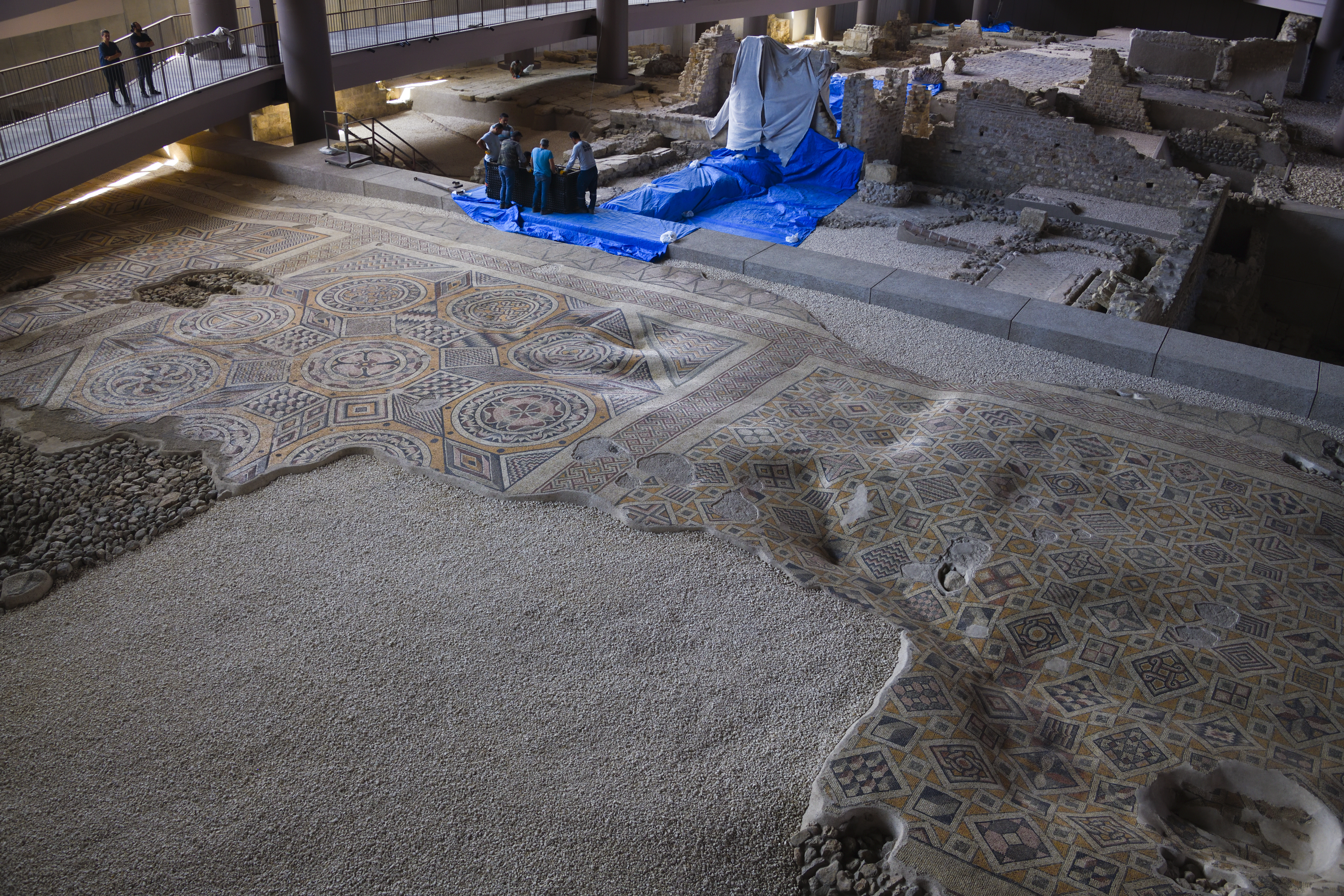
Museum Hotel Antakya

The long and varied history has created many architectural sites of interest. There is much for visitors to see in Antakya, although many buildings have been lost in the rapid growth and redevelopment of the city in recent decades:

- Hatay Archaeology Museum has the second largest collection of Roman mosaics in the world;
- The rock-carved Church of St Peter, with its network of refuges and tunnels carved out of the rock, a site of Christian pilgrimage. There are also tombs cut into the rock face at various places along the Orontes valley;
- Old market district: A collection of traditional shops exactly in the city centre, marked by the sign Uzun Çarşı Caddesi;
- The seedy Gündüz cinema in the city centre, once used as the parliament building of the Republic of Hatay;
- The waterfalls at the Harbiye / Daphne promenade;
- The Ottoman Habib'i Neccar Mosque, the oldest mosque in Antakya and one of the oldest in Anatolia;
- The labyrinth of narrow streets and old Antakya houses, indicative of its being the oldest part of town;
- Vespasianus Titus Tunnel-Samandagı. It is approximately 35 km (22 mi) far from the centre;
- Beşikli Cave and Graves (the antique city of Seleukeia Pierria);
- St. Simon Monastery;
- Bagras (Bakras) Castle, which was built in antiquity and restored many times in later centuries (particularly during the Crusades, when it was a stronghold of the Knights Templar); it served as a watchtower on the 27 km (17 mi) mountain road from İskenderun (Alexandretta) to Antakya (Antioch);
- The panoramic view of the city from the heights of Mount Habib-i Neccar;
- St. Paul Orthodox Church.

With its rich architectural heritage, Antakya is a member of the Norwich-based European Association of Historic Towns and Regions. The Roman bridge (Asi Bridge, thought to date from the era of Diocletian) was destroyed in 1972 during the widening and channelling of the Orontes.

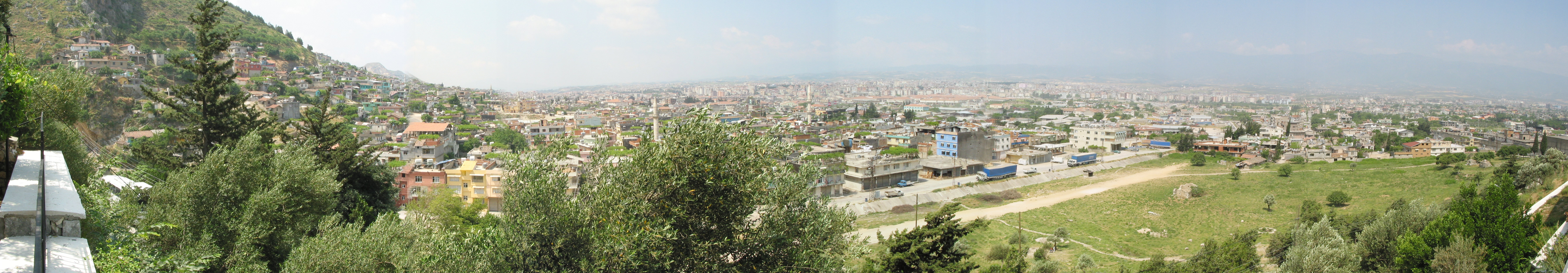
A panoramic view of Antakya from the Church of Saint Peter
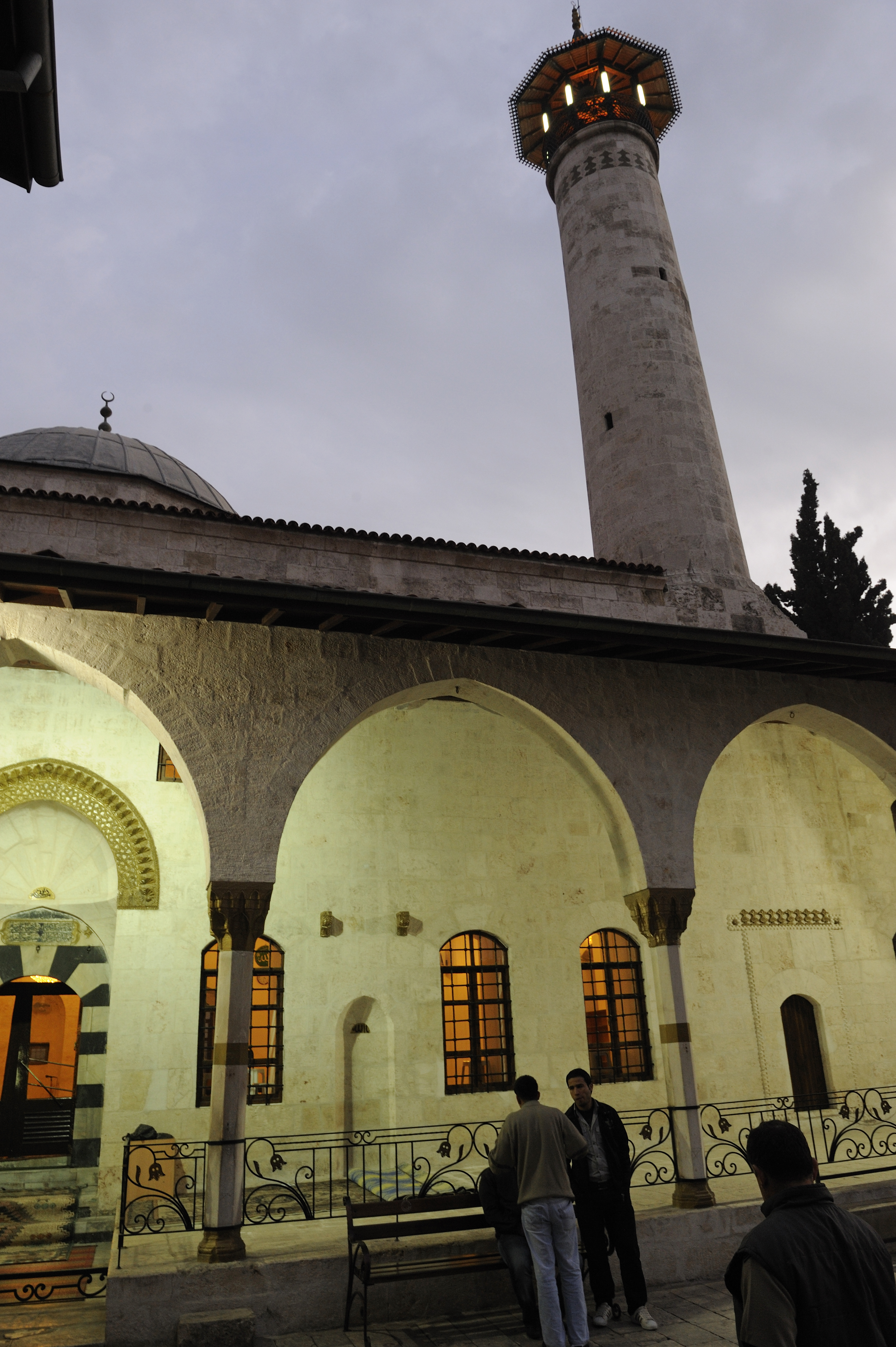
Antakya Yeni Camii Exterior

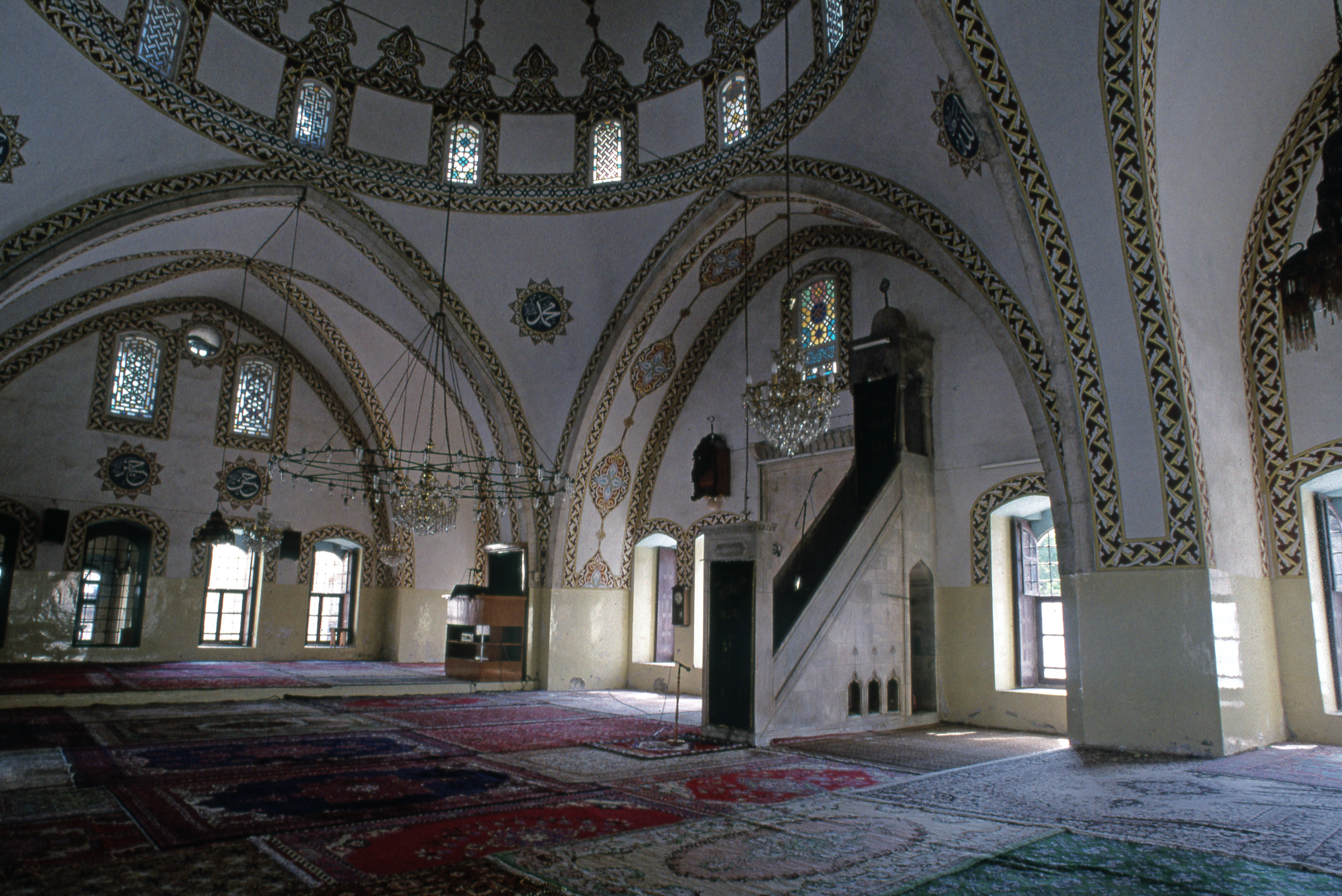
Antakya Habib-i Neccar Camii Interior

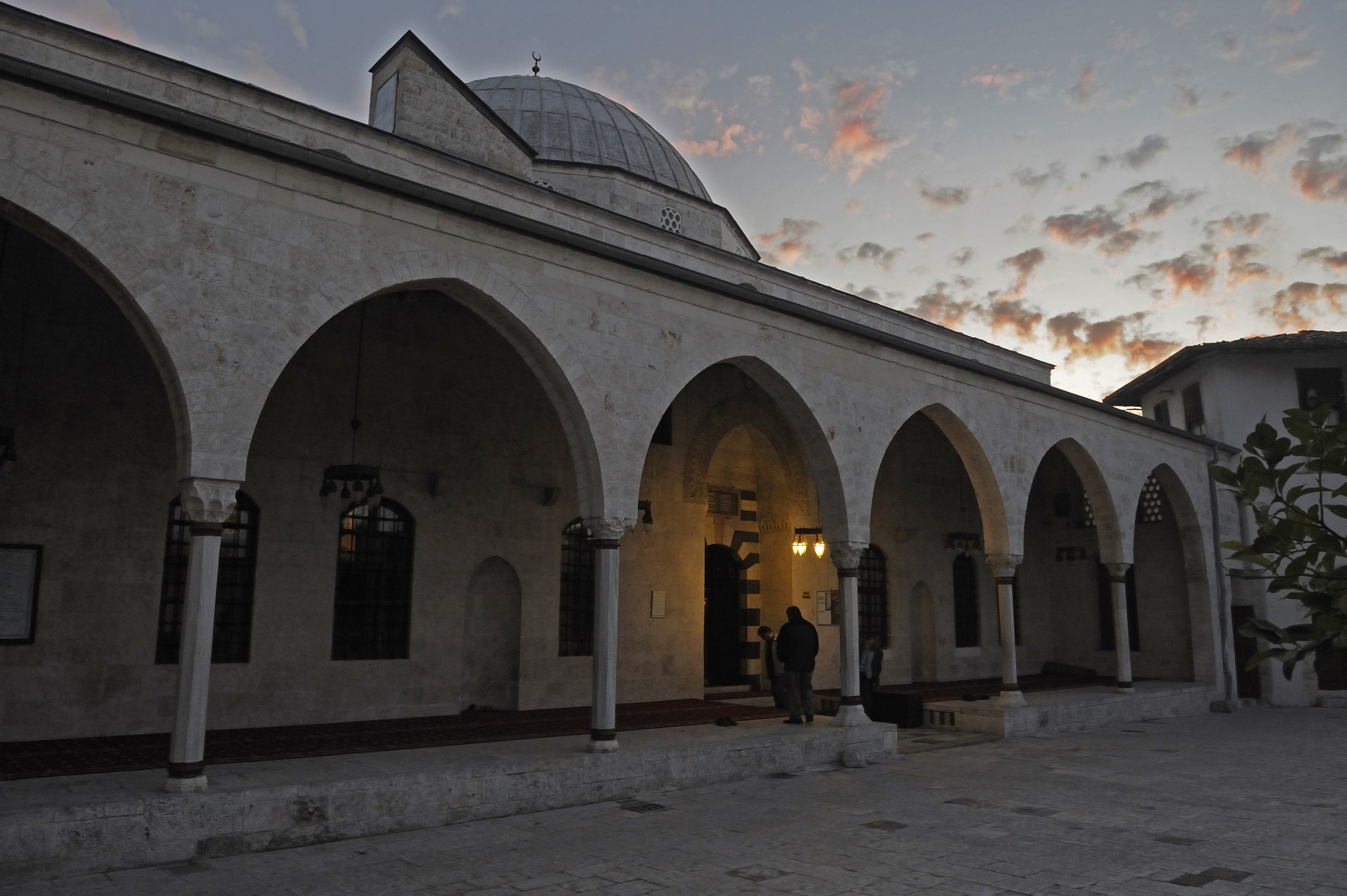
Antakya Habib-i Neccar Camii Exterior

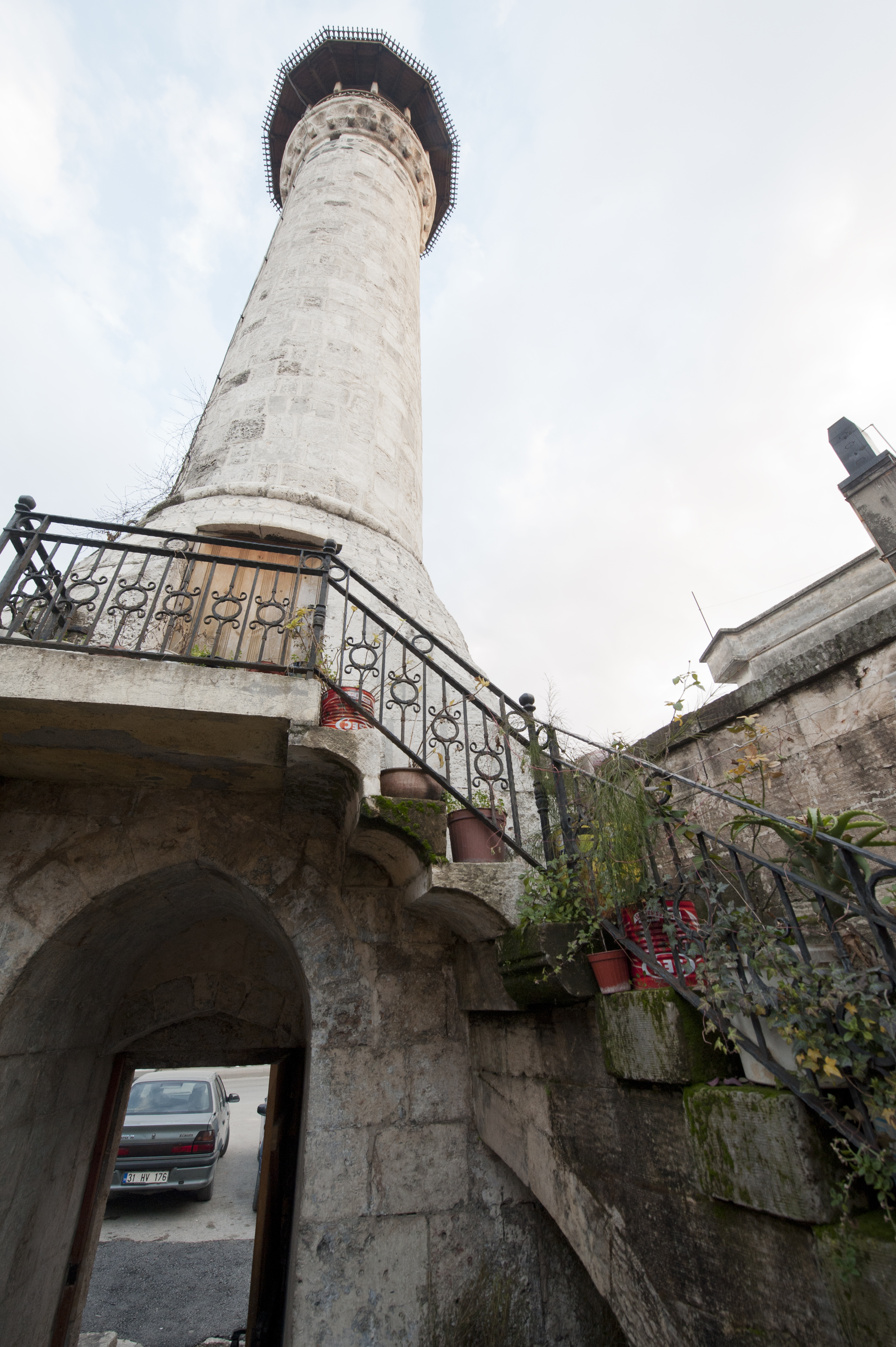
Antakya Sarimiye Mosque Minaret

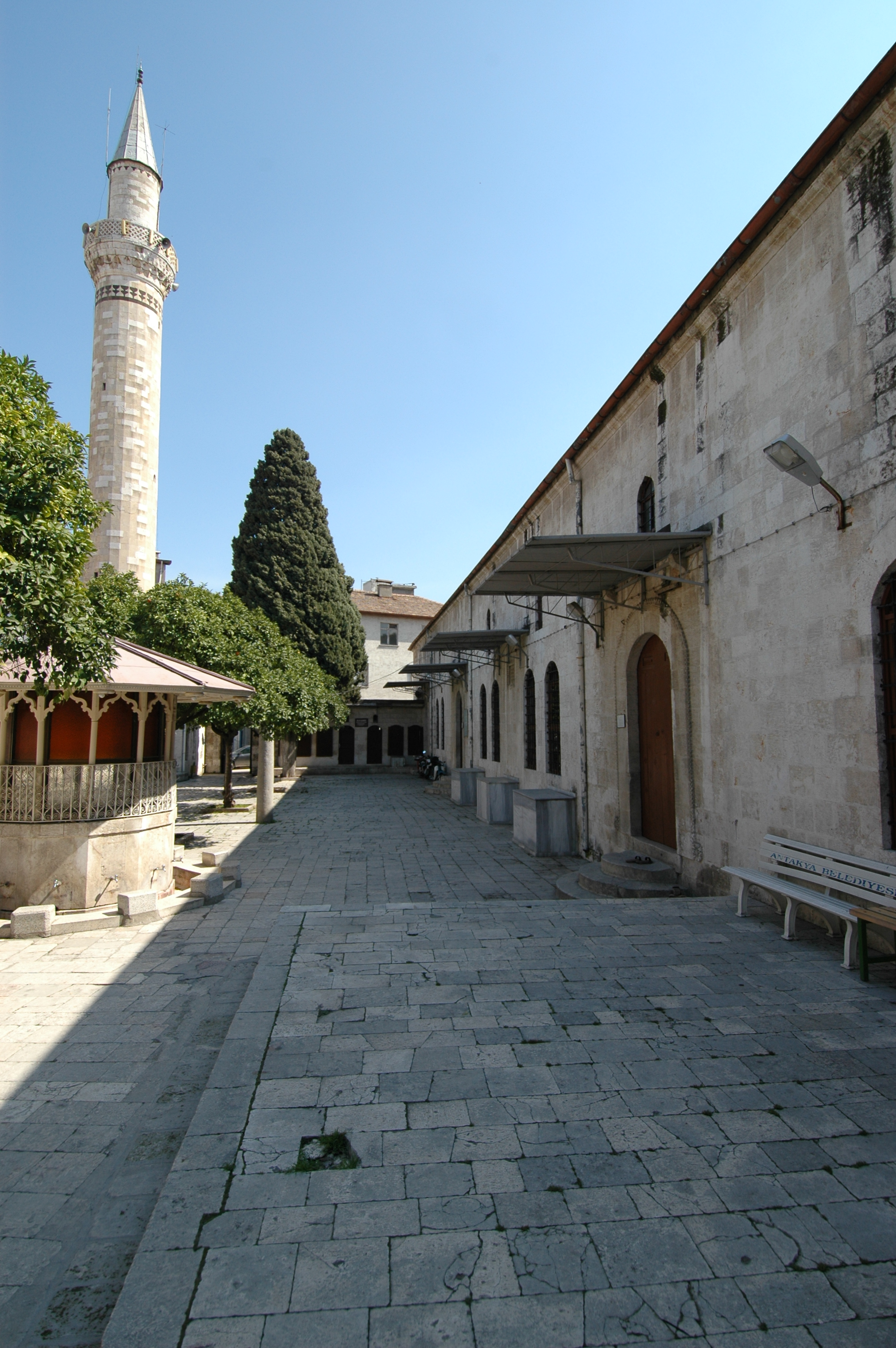
Antakya Ulu Cami Entrance to courtyard

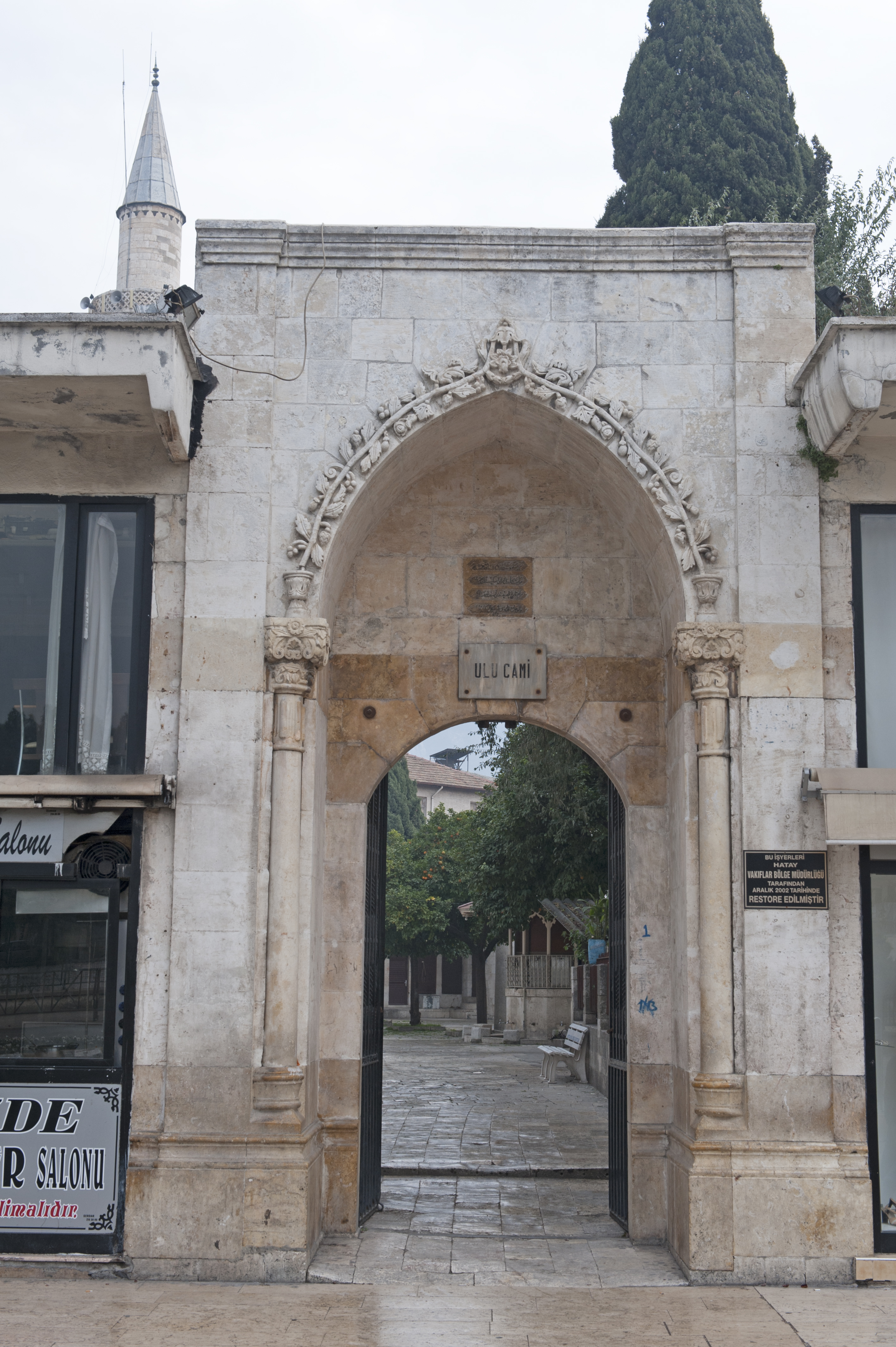
Antakya Ulu Cami

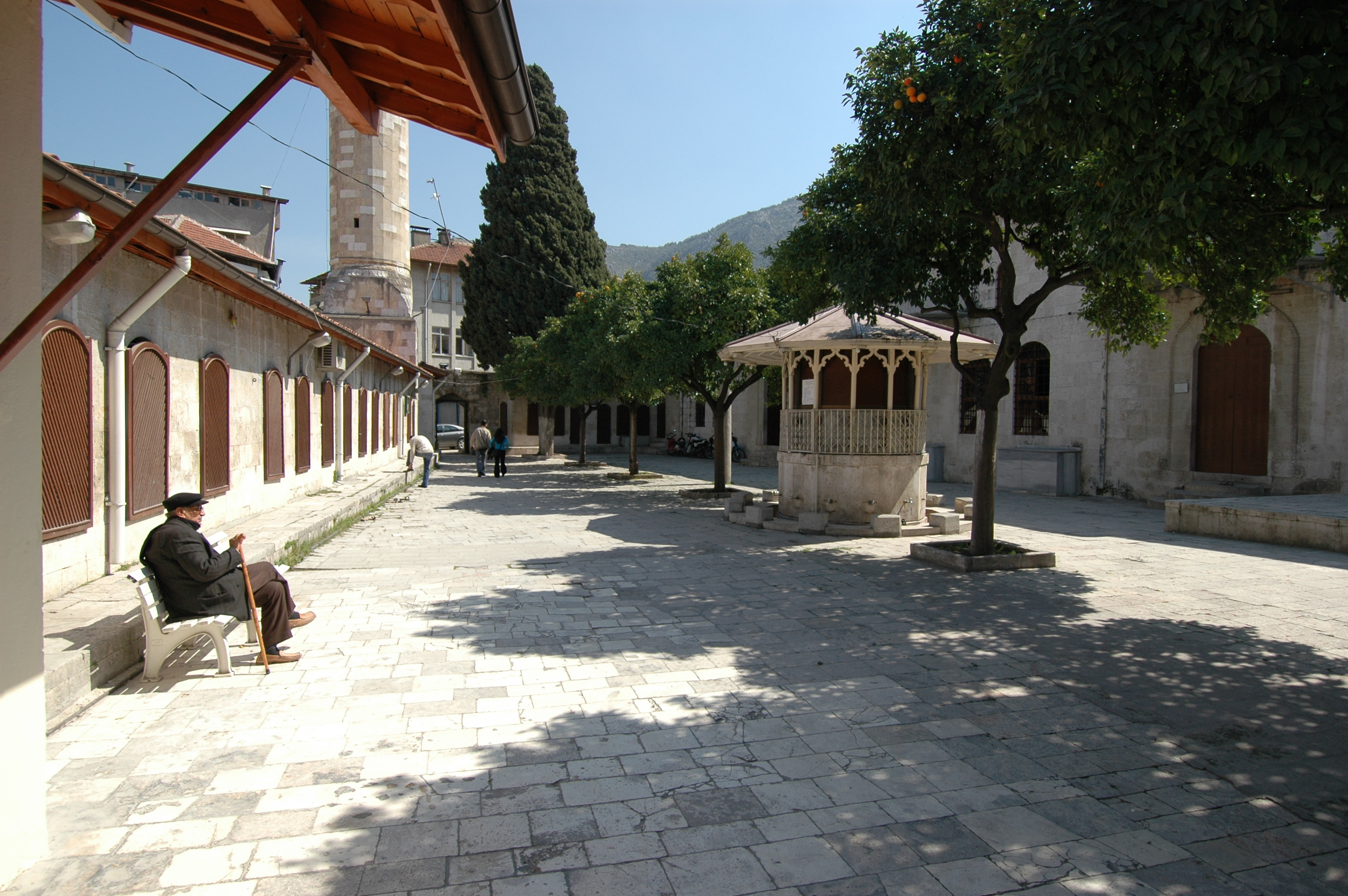
Antakya Ulu Cami

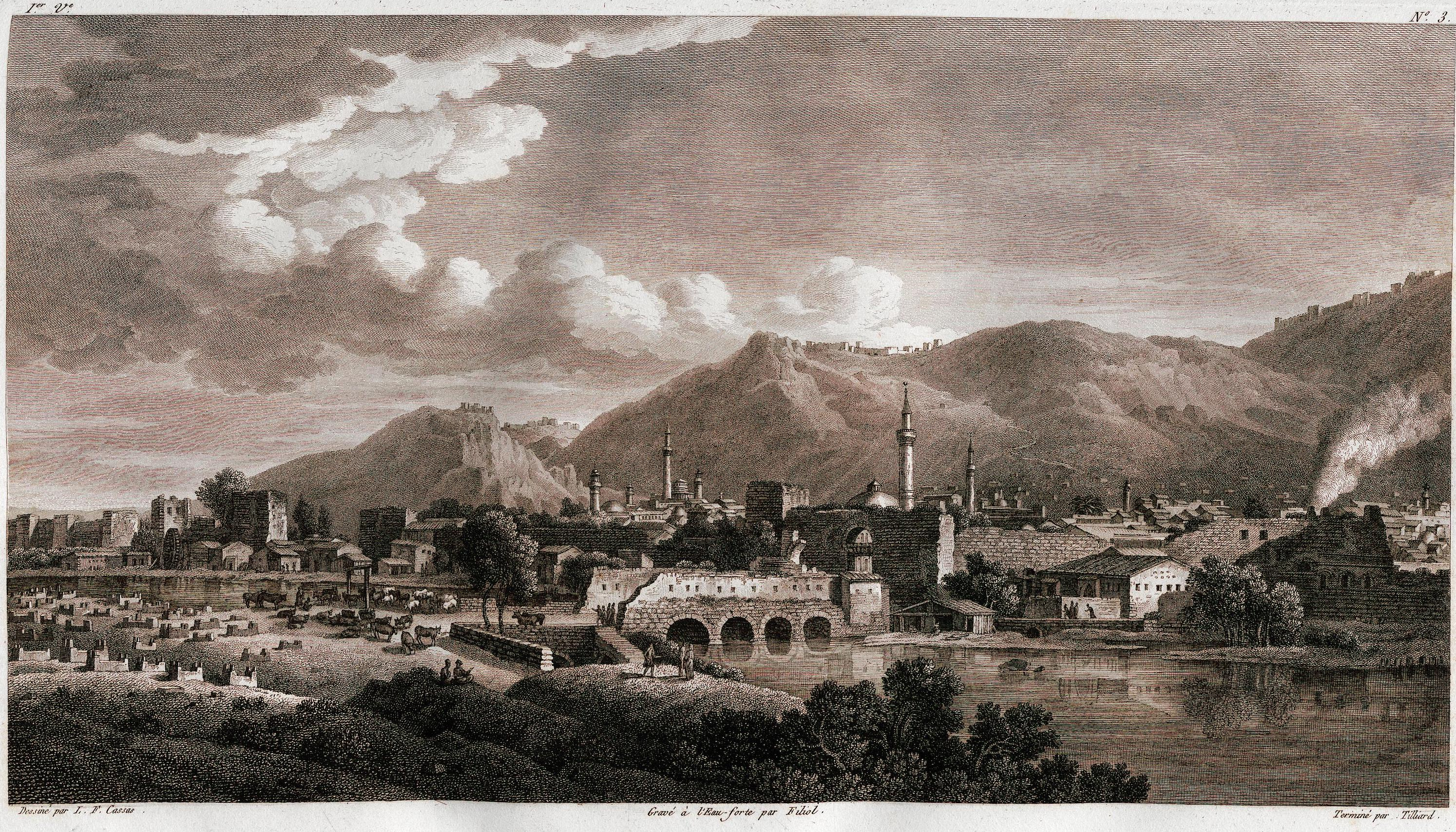
View of the river in the 1780s, by Louis-François Cassas

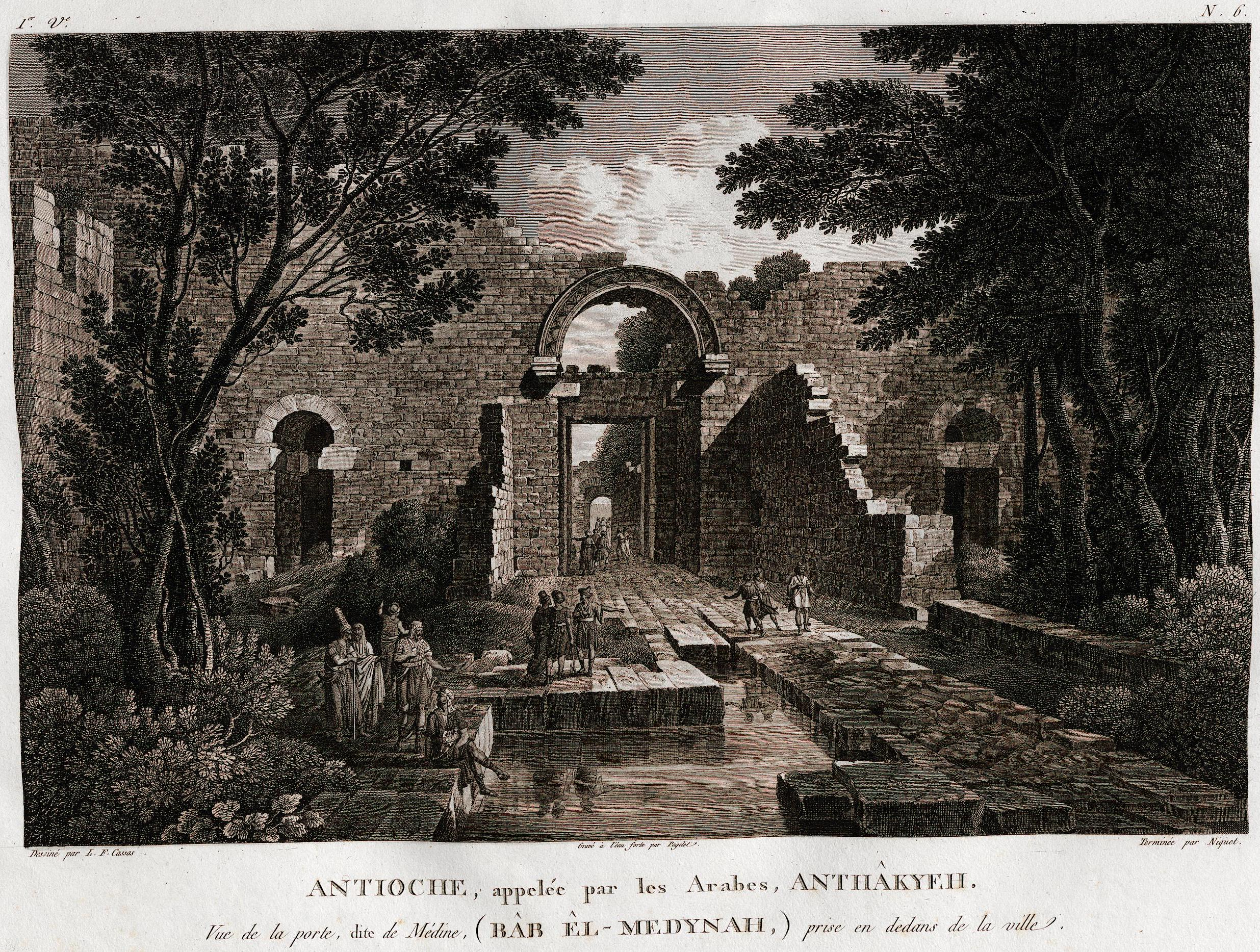
Medina gate in the 1780s, by Louis-François Cassas

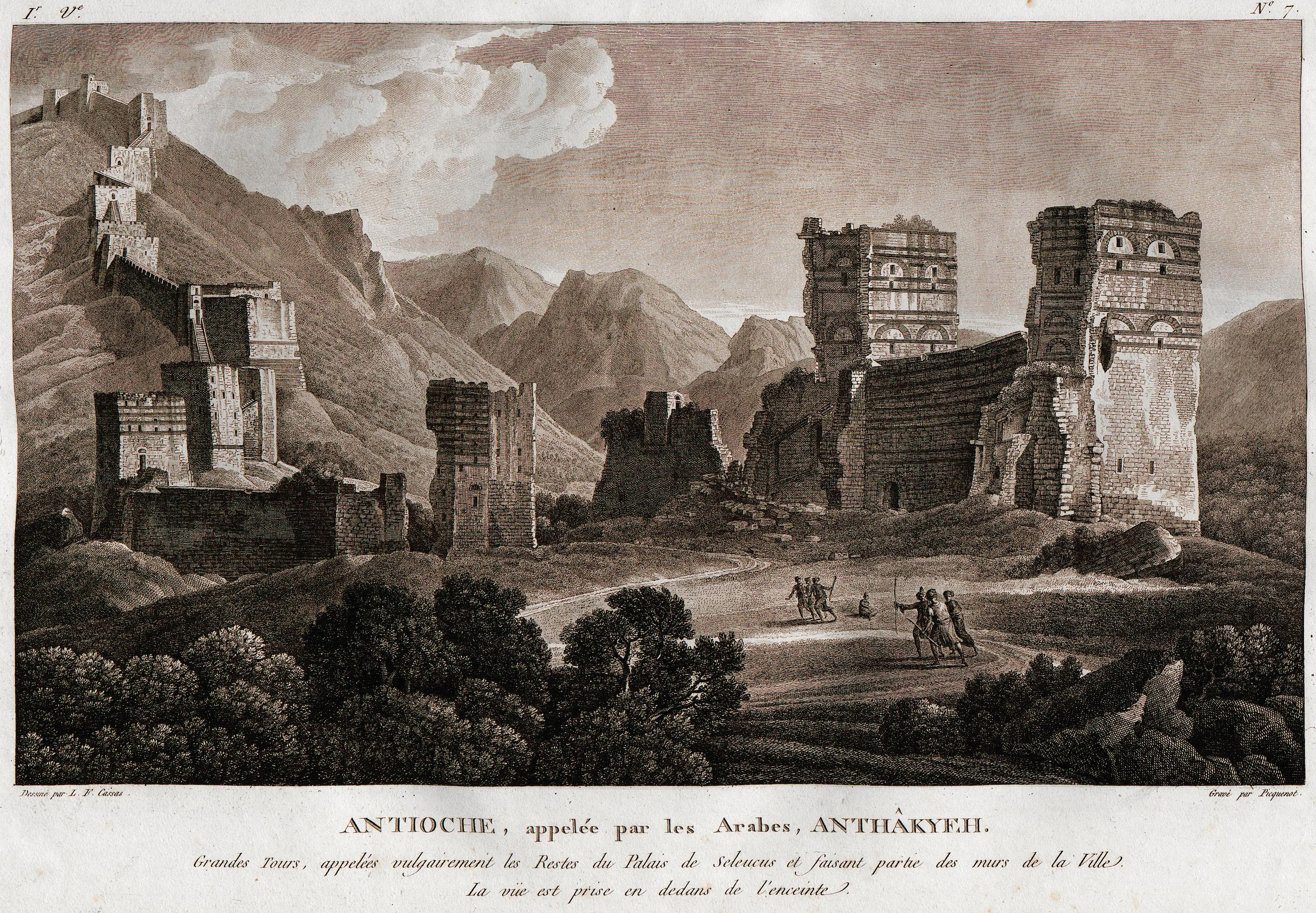
Ruins of the Seleucus palace in the 1780s, by Louis-François Cassas

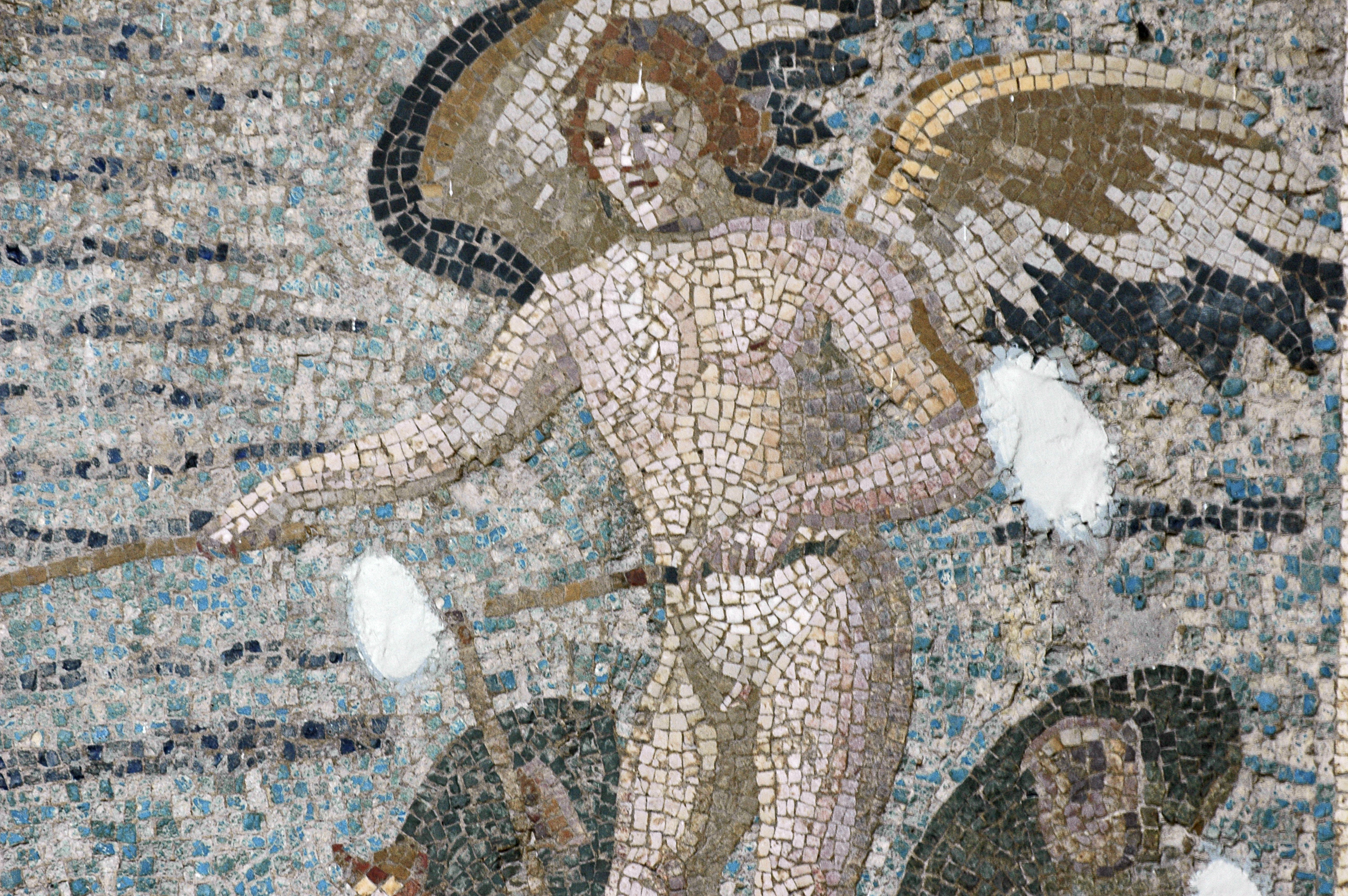
Mosaics of Eros are standing on the wings of two Psyches and whipping them on in Hatay Archaeology Museum

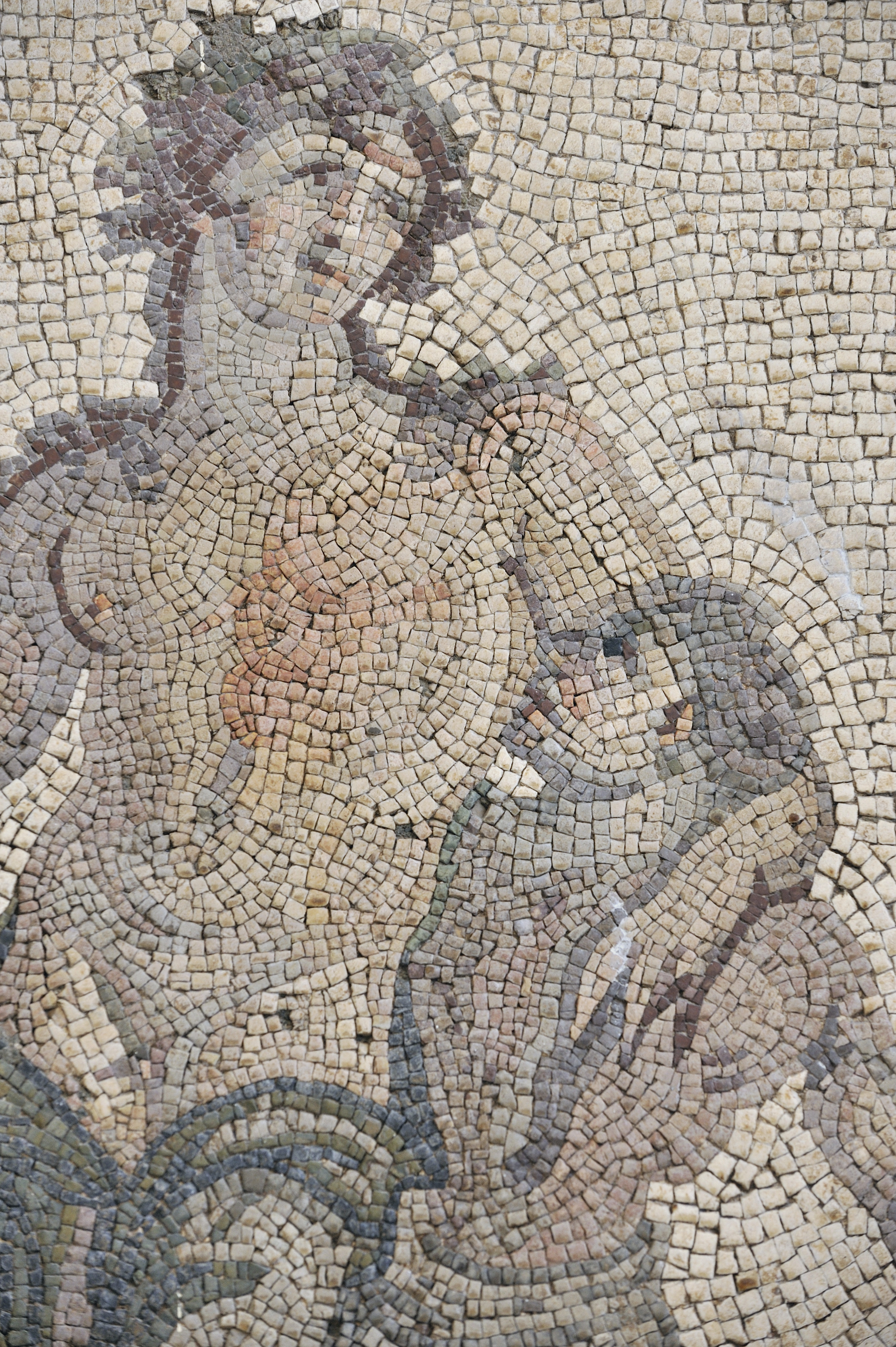
Dionysus mosaic in Hatay Archaeology Museum

== Transport ==
The city is served from Hatay Airport.

== Sports ==
Antakya has one male professional football club, Hatayspor, which play in the TFF 2. Lig. There is also a female professional team called Hatay Büyükşehir Belediyesi. Hatay Büyükşehir Belediyespor, a women's basketball team, is also present, and plays in the Turkish Women's Basketball League.

== Cuisine ==
The cuisine of Antakya is renowned. Its cuisine is considered Levantine rather than Turkish. The cuisine offers plenty of meals, where beef and lamb are mainly used. Popular dishes include the typical Turkish kebab, served with spices and onions in flat unleavened bread, with yoghurt as ali nazik kebab, oruk, kaytaz böreği and katıklı ekmek. Hot, spicy food is a feature of this part of Turkey, along with Turkish coffee and local specialties.

Here are some savoury foods:

- İçli köfte and other oruk varieties: varieties of the Arabic kibbeh, deep-fried balls of bulgur wheat stuffed with minced meat; or baked in ovens in cylinder-cone shape. Saç oruğu is made of the same ingredients, however in circular shape;
- Kaytaz böreği: It is patty that is made of wheat, beef, tomato and onion;
- Katıklı ekmek: Ingredients in Katıklı Ekmek usually consist of wheat, traditional pepper (paste), spices such as sesame and theme, çökelek or cheese. It looks like an ancestor of pizza. Not a lot of restaurants serve it; however, it can be found in old-market that is located in the centre and Harbiye;
- Pomegranate syrup, used as a salad dressing, called debes ramman, a traditional Levantine Arabic dressing;
- Semirsek, a thin bread with hot pepper, minced meat or spinach filling;
- Spicy chicken, a specialty of Harbiye;
- Za'atar (Zahter) a traditional Levantine Arabic paste of spiced thyme, oregano, and sesame seeds, mixed with olive oil, spread on flat (called pide or in English pita) bread;
- Fresh chick peas, munched as a snack;
- Hirise, boiled and pounded wheat meal;
- Aşur, meat mixed with crushed wheat, chickpea, cumin, onion, pepper and walnut.

Meze

- Hummus – the chick-pea dip;
- Pureed fava beans;
- Patlıcan salatası: Patlıcan salatası or babaganoush, made of baked and sliced aubergines that mixed with pepper and tomato. It is usually served with pomegranate syrup;
- Taratur: Known also as Tarator, made of walnuts, "tahin", yoghurt and garlic;
- Süzme yoğurt: A type of yoghurt that its water content is removed with traditional methods;
- Ezme biber: It is made of pepper and walnuts;
- Surke – dried curds served in spicy olive oil;
- Çökelek – the spicy sun-dried cheese;
- Eels from the Orontes, spiced and fried in olive oil.

Sweets/desserts

- Künefe – a hot cheese, kadaif-based sweet. Antakya is Turkey's künefe capital; the pastry shops in the centre compete to claim being kings Turkish: kral of the pastry;
- Müşebbek – rings of deep fried pastry;
- Peynirli irmik helvası – Peynirli İrmik Helvası is a dessert that is made of semolina, sugar and traditional cheese that is the same as used in künefe. It is served warm, especially in restaurants in the region Harbiye, rather than künefe shops that are located in the centre.

== Twin towns ==
Antakya is twinned with:

- Aalen, Germany (since 1995).

== Notable people ==
- Alexandros (1st century BC) Greek sculptor
- George of Antioch
- Ignatius of Antioch, Patriarch of Antioch
- John Chrysostom (349–407) Patriarch of Constantinople
- Ṣidqī ismail (1924–1972), writer
- Saint Luke, first century AD, Christian evangelist and author of the Gospel of St. Luke and Acts of the Apostles
- Yağısıyan, Seljukid governor of the city up to its capture by the Crusaders
- Selâhattin Ülkümen – Righteous among the nations
- Tayfur Sökmen – The president of the Republic of Hatay during its existence between the years 1938 and 1939.
- Gökhan Zan (born 1981) former professional footballer
