= Hatay Büyükşehir Belediye Gençlik ve Spor Kulübü =

Basketball team in Antakya/Hatay, Turkey

- Founded: 2014
- History: Antakya Belediyesi (2010–2012); Homend Antakya Belediye (2012–2014); Hatay Büyükşehir Belediye (2014–present)
- Location: Antakya/Hatay, Turkey
- Team colors: Blue and White
- President: (Turkey) Lütfü Savaş
- Website: hataybbspor.com

Hatay Büyükşehir Belediye Gençlik ve Spor Kulübü, known as Hatay Büyükşehir Belediyespor, is a Turkish sports club, based in Hatay, Turkey.

Hatay Büyükşehir Belediyespor is a multi-sports club and competes in Football, Basketball, Volleyball, Chess, Water polo, Swimming, Archery, Athletics, Tennis, Wrestling, Muay Thai, Karate and Kickboxing.

== Previous names ==
- Antakya Belediyesi (2010–2014)
- Hatay Büyükşehir Belediyespor (2014–present)

== Departments ==
=== Football ===
==== Women's Football ====
Hatay Büyükşehir Belediyesi women's football team competes in the third-level of Turkish Women's Football League.

==== Deaf Football ====
Hatay Büyükşehir Belediyesi deaf football team competes in the first-level of Turkish Deaf Football League.

Achievements

- Turkish Deaf Football First League
  - Third (1): 2013–2014

=== Basketball ===
==== Women's Basketball ====
Hatay Büyükşehir Belediyesi women's basketball team competes in the first-level of Turkish Women's Basketball League.

Achievements

- Turkish Women's Basketball League
  - Runners-up (1): 2015–16
- Turkish President Cup:
  - Champions (1): 2016

=== Volleyball ===
==== Men's Volleyball ====
Hatay Büyükşehir Belediyesi men's volleyball team competes in the second-level of Turkish Men's Volleyball League.

=== Chess ===
Hatay Büyükşehir Belediyesi chess team competes in the first-level of Türkiye İş Bankası Chess League.

Achievements

- Türkiye İş Bankası Chess League:
  - Champions (1): 2016
  - Runners-up (1): 2014
  - Third place (1): 2017
