= Gabriel Bagradian =

Literary novel protagonist

Gabriel Bagradian is the protagonist of the 1933 novel The Forty Days of Musa Dagh by Franz Werfel and the 1982 film adaptation, where he was portrayed by Kabir Bedi. Gabriel, along with the rest of the Bagradian family, is a wholly fictional character; no piece of historical evidence ever proved their existence. Oliver Kohns, author of "The Aesthetics of Human Rights in Franz Werfel's The Forty Days of Musa Dagh," stated that therefore the Bagradians were "The most significant deviation from the historical record" in the work.

== Fictional biography ==
Gabriel is an ethnic Armenian and veteran of the Balkan Wars who lived in France for many years, married a French woman, and had a son with her. The events of the novel occur during a visit to his hometown Yoghonoluk, then in the Ottoman Empire. Initially he feels a lack of connection to his hometown, but he takes a leadership role and helps the village find safety on Musa Dagh and then escape on a French warship from the Armenian genocide. Lionel Steiman, author of Franz Werfel: The Faith of an Exile: From Prague to Beverly Hills, states "It does not take much to turn Gabriel Bagradian from a detached, unconcerned European into a committed Armenian activist."

Gabriel remains on the mountain after ensuring the safety of the others, including his wife, and is killed by Ottoman soldiers. The 1982 film version does not portray his death.

== Analysis ==
Ritchie Robinson stated that Gabriel was meant to make Western European audiences sympathetic for the Armenians as Gabriel was raised in French culture, and therefore readers could identify with him.

Steiman wrote that Gabriel's "spiritual odyssey" was the "primary focus" of the work even though Werfel had extensively researched the Musa Dagh rescue; Steiman stated that as Gabriel's death and the rescue are both due to fate, despite Gabriel being credited skill-wise for it, the scenario reflects "Werfel's failure to integrate the two" aspects. Kohns also stated that Gabriel was the "main focus" of the work and that there were comparisons to Moses.

Kohns stated that the author may have implied that the Armenians could have only survived the Musa Dagh incident because they had "a "Westernized" leader" which would "not do justice" to the real life events, although he also noted how Gabriel becomes increasingly in touch with his heritage and experiences "his increasing "re-nationalization"" into being an Armenian.

Neal Ascherson of the London Review of Books stated "although it’s wrong to say that" Werfel and his wife Alma were the same people as the fictional Bagdradians, "the travails of an assimilated intellectual torn between his loyalty to an ancestral people threatened with destruction and his bond to a wife from a quite different culture are unmistakeably Werfel interrogating himself." Donna H. Keizer, author of Jewish-German Identity in the Orientalist Literature of Else Lasker-Schüler, Friedrich Wolf, and Franz Werfel, also wrote that through Gabriel, Werfel "seemed to be working out his own, individual issues of identity". Yair Auron, author of "The Forty Days of Musa Dagh: Its Impact on Jewish Youth in Palestine and Europe," pointed to how Werfel felt that his link with his Jewish identity had been severed and how Gabriel had the same predicament as he had lived so long in France.

J. P. Stern, author of The Dear Purchase: A Theme in German Modernism, stated that the character's death was a "mystical redemption" rather than a "realistic narrative" and that since the text does not make clear how the character's death, which Gabriel knowingly decides on, is a benefit, "On any mundane view[...]his sacrifice is pointless, but it fits the destructive ideology of the age."
