= Mehmet Ugur =

Turkish-British professor

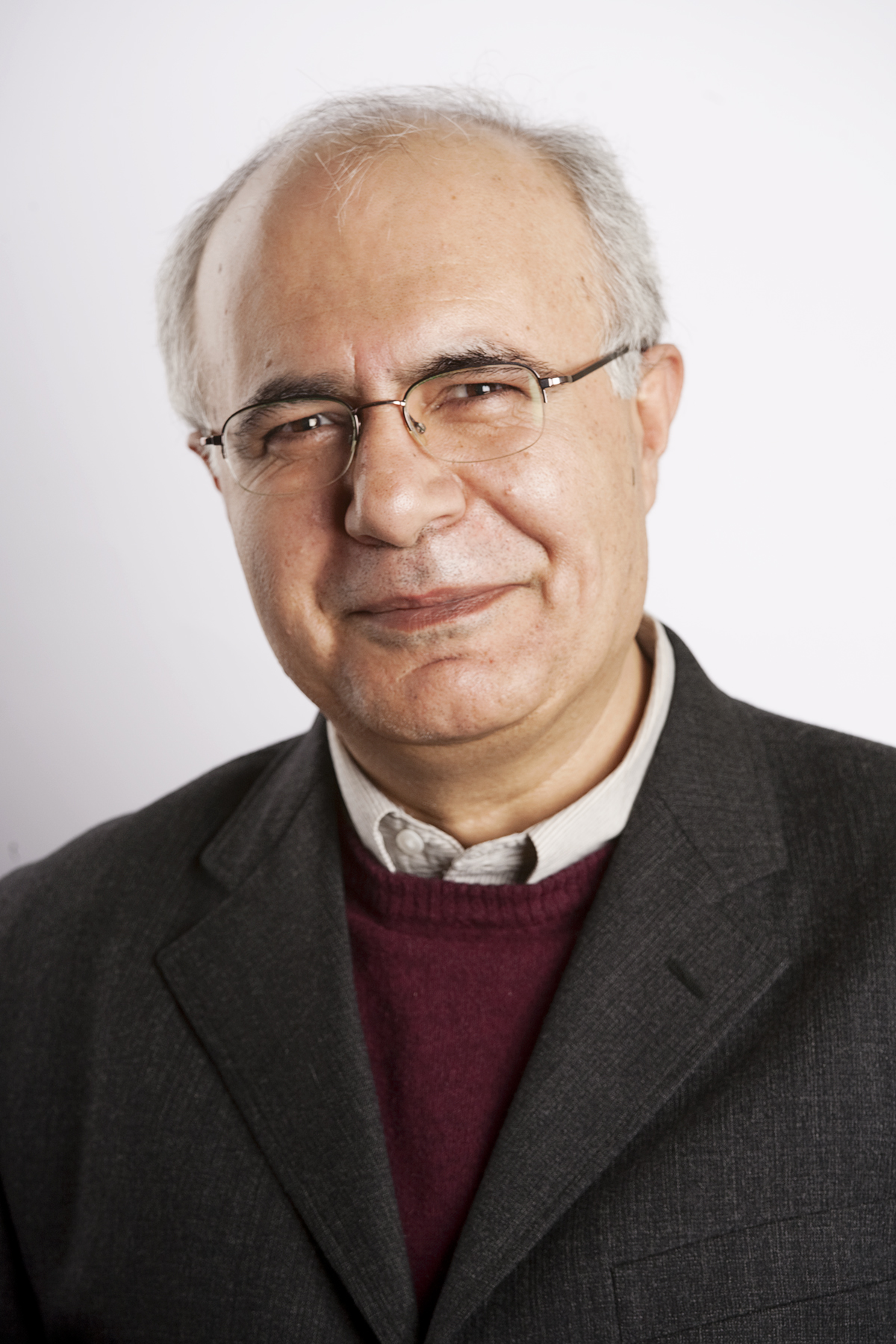
- Mehmet Ugur in 2011
- Born: 3 April 1954 (age 72); Samandag, Turkey
- Citizenship: Turkish - British
- Education: Middle East Technical University, BSc London School of Economics and Political Science, MSc London School of Economics and Political Science, PhD
- Occupation: Professor
- Website: gre.ac.uk/about-us/faculty

Mehmet Ugur (born 3 April 1954) is a Turkish-British professor of economics and institutions at the University of Greenwich in London. He is the deputy director of the Institute of Political Economy, Governance, Finance and Accountability (PEGFA) at the School of Accounting, Finance, and Economics.

== Biography ==
=== Early life and education ===
Mehmet Ugur was born on 3 April 1954 in Samandag, Turkey. He finished his BSc in Economics and Statistics at the Middle East Technical University (METU) in 1978, yet his studies were interrupted by a military coup. After being imprisoned in Turkey for over four years, he sought asylum in the UK in 1985. He completed his MSc in Economic History at the London School of Economics (LSE) in 1988 and his PhD in 1995 on European integration.

== Career ==
Ugur started his career as a lecturer of Economics in 1990 at the University of Greenwich. He was promoted to Reader in Political Economy in 2003 and became a Professor of Economics and Institutions in 2013. In addition, Ugur has played a role in the Greenwich University administration and leadership in economics.

He has been involved in several research projects funded by the European Commission, the Department for International Development (DFID), and the Economic and Social Research Council (ESRC). From 2010 to 2015, Ugur was the joint organizer for the Cochrane and Campbell Collaborations Economics Methods Group (CCEMG).

As of 2024, Ugur is serving as a professor of economics and institutions at the University of Greenwich. He is also the deputy director of the Institute of Political Economy, Governance, Finance, and Accountability (PEGFA) at the School of Accounting, Finance, and Economics. In addition, Ugur is a member of different educational organizations and research networks.

== Research Works ==
Ugur's research covers several fields, including policy reforms, corruption, innovation, and market dynamics. He examined how citizenship rules in the European Union (EU) have created challenges in unifying immigration policies by increasing national and non-national divisions.

In a 1999 study on the EU-Turkey Association Agreement, Ugur related the delay in Turkey's accession to the European Union to the lack of credibility in Turkey's commitment to democratic reforms and the weaknesses of the EU in inducing sustainable policy reforms in candidate countries. By 2013, his research showed that EU membership requirements, which had previously encouraged democratic reforms in Central and Eastern Europe, became less effective after countries joined, as the threat of exclusion from the club lacked credibility.

In 2014, Ugur conducted a meta-analysis on the effects of corruption on economic growth. His findings indicated that corruption significantly harms long-term income growth, emphasizing the importance of addressing corruption to achieve sustainable development.

In 2016, his research on R&D investments revealed that their productivity benefits were smaller and more inconsistent than previously thought due to issues with data quality and lack of account for market structure. In the same year, another study by Ugur showed that the positive effect of R&D investments on firm survival is smaller among firms closest to the innovation front.

In a 2022 study, Ugur reviewed the role of intellectual property rights (IPRs) in innovation and economic growth. He found little evidence that stronger IPRs improve outcomes, challenging the common belief that they foster innovation, technology diffusion, and economic growth.

Ugur also scrutinized government subsidies for R&D in a 2023 study. He found that these subsidies were less effective for larger, older, or more established firms, particularly during economic downturns, raising questions about their universal effectiveness.

In 2024, Ugur argued that market power, rather than innovation, was the primary driver behind the global decline in labor share, especially when innovation focused on marketing or organizational strategies. Another study that year highlighted how market power harmed both labor share and employment at the same time.

== Selected publications ==
Ugur has authored/co-authored two monographs, five edited books, 48 peer-reviewed journal articles, and 29 book chapters. Some of them are listed below:

- Freedom of movement vs. exclusion: A re-interpretation of the 'insider' - 'outsider' divide in the European Union immigration policy (1995).
- Explaining protectionism and liberalization in European Union trade policy: The case of textiles and clothing (1998).
- Corporate Governance in Turkey: An Overview and Some Policy Recommendations (2003).
- Open-ended membership prospect and commitment credibility: Explaining the deadlock in EU-Turkey accession negotiations (2010)
- Evidence on The Economic Growth Impacts of Corruption in Low-Income Countries and Beyond: A Systematic Review (2011).
- Corruption's Direct Effects on Per‐Capita Income Growth: A Meta‐Analysis (2014).
- A Firm-Level Dataset for Analyzing Entry, Exit, Employment, And R&D Expenditures in the UK: 1997–2012, (2016).
- What do we Know about R & D Spillovers and Productivity? Meta-Analysis Evidence on Heterogeneity and Statistical Power (2019).
- Leverage, Competition and Financial Distress Hazard: Implications for Capital Structure in the Presence of Agency Costs (2021).
- Innovation, market power and the labor share: evidence from OECD industries (2024).
- Effects of Innovation and Markups on Employment and Labor Share in OECD Industries (2024).
