= Vespasianus Titus Tunnel =

Ancient water tunnel situated in Turkey

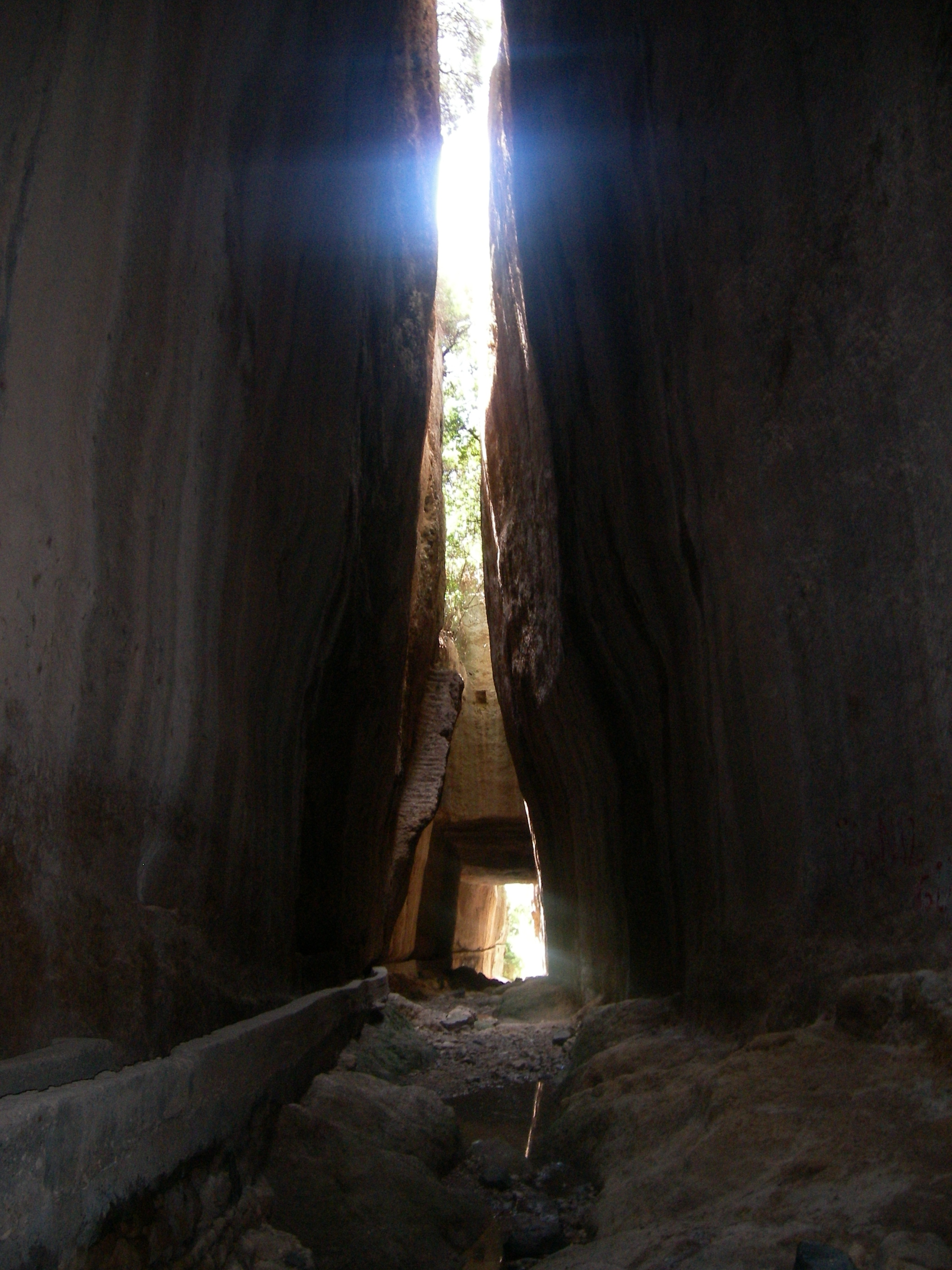

- Location within Turkey
- 36°07′14″N 35°55′19″E
- Type: Tunnel
- Cultures: Roman
- Location: Samandağ, Hatay Province, Turkey
- Region: Mediterranean

Site notes
- Owner: Public
- Public access: Yes

The Vespasianus Titus Tunnel is an ancient water tunnel built for the city of Seleucia Pieria, the port of Antioch (modern Antakya), in the 1st and 2nd centuries AD.

It is located at the foot of the Nur Mountains, near the modern village of Çevlik, 7 km (4.3 mi) northwest of central Samandağ (the medieval port of Saint Symeon) and 35 km (22 mi) southwest of Antakya.

The tunnel is part of a water diversion system consisting of a dam, a short approach channel, the first tunnel section, a short intermediary channel, the second tunnel section and a long discharge channel.

The construction of the tunnel was ordered by the Roman emperor Vespasian (reigned 69–79 AD) to divert the floodwaters running down the mountain and threatening the harbor. It was built by digging the rocks using manpower only. The construction began under Vespasian and continued under his son Titus (r. 79–81 AD) and his successors. It was completed in the 2nd century under Antoninus Pius (r. 138–161). An inscription carved in rock at the entrance of the first tunnel section shows the names of Vespasianus and Titus, and another one at the discharge tunnel the name of Antoninus.

== World Heritage Site status ==
The tunnel was added to the tentative list in the cultural category of UNESCO World Heritage Site on 15 April 2014.
