= The Forty Days of Musa Dagh =

1933 novel by Franz Werfel

- Author: Franz Werfel
- Original title: Die vierzig Tage des Musa Dagh
- Translator: Geoffrey Dunlop and James Reidel
- Language: German
- Genre: Historical, War novel
- Publisher: Fischer Verlag (German), David R. Godine (English trans.)
- Publication date: 1933, (1934, 2012 English tr.)
- Publication place: Berlin, Germany
- Media type: Print
- Pages: 936 pp. (English tr.)
- ISBN: 978-1-56792-407-7 (2012 U.S. edition)

The Forty Days of Musa Dagh (German: Die vierzig Tage des Musa Dagh) is a 1933 novel by Austrian-Bohemian writer Franz Werfel based on events that took place in 1915, during the second year of the First World War and at the beginning of the Armenian genocide.

The novel focuses on a small community of Armenians living near Musa Dagh, a mountain in Vilayet of Aleppo in the Ottoman Empire that defended themselves there. The mountain is now in Hatay Province, part of southern Turkey, on the Mediterranean coast. Events in Constantinople (Istanbul) and provincial capitals, where the Committee of Union and Progress Young Turk government orchestrated the deportations, concentration camps and massacres of the empire's Armenian citizens are also part of the book. This policy, as well as those who bore responsibility for it, has been controversial and contested since 1915. Because of this or perhaps in spite of it, the facts and scope of the Armenian Genocide were little known until Werfel's novel, which entailed voluminous research and is generally accepted as based on historical events.

The novel was published in German in November 1933. It achieved great international success and has been credited with awakening the world to the evidence of the persecution and genocide inflicted on the Armenian nation during the First World War. The Forty Days of Musa Dagh also foreshadows the Holocaust of the Second World War due in part to the rise of Adolf Hitler and Nazi Germany, which paralleled the novel's creation. In 2012, David R. Godine, Publisher, issued a revised and expanded English translation of The Forty Days of Musa Dagh that incorporates virtually all of the material left out of Geoffrey Dunlop's 1934 translation. Due to Turkish government efforts to prevent development of a film version, only one film adaptation from 1982 has been produced.

== Synopsis ==
=== Context ===
Franz Werfel had served as a corporal and telephone operator in the Austro-Hungarian Army artillery during the First World War on the Russian front and later as a propaganda writer for the Military Press Bureau (with Rainer Maria Rilke and others) in Vienna. The horrors he witnessed during the war, as well as the banality of the civil and military bureaucracies, served him well during the course of writing the book. His reason for writing the novel came as a result of a trip through Egypt, Palestine, Syria, and Lebanon from January through March 1930 and is given in a prefatory note in the novel:

This book was conceived in March of the year 1929 [sic], during the course of a stay in Damascus. The miserable sight of maimed and famished-looking refugee children, working in a carpet factory, gave me the final impulse to snatch the incomprehensible destiny of the Armenian people from the Hell of all that had taken place. The writing of the book followed between July 1932 and March 1933. Meanwhile, in November, on a lecture tour through German cities, the author selected Chapter 5 of Book One for public readings. It was read in its present form, based on the historic records of a conversation between Enver Pasha and Pastor Johannes Lepsius.

Werfel does not mention here that he rewrote much of the novel in May 1933, responding to events in Nazi Germany and kept revising it up until it was published. Later, speaking to reporters, Werfel elaborated: "The struggle of 5,000 people on Musa Dagh had so fascinated me that I wished to aid the Armenian people by writing about it and bringing it to the world."

=== Book One: Coming Events ===
Werfel's narrative style is omniscient as well as having a "polyfocus", in which he moves the perspective from character to character and to the third person perspective. For that reason, the connection between the author's consciousness and that of his characters can almost read seamlessly. This is evident as the novel opens in the spring of 1915, during the second year of the First World War.

Gabriel Bagradian, a wealthy Armenian from Paris, has returned to his native village of Yoghonoluk, one of seven villages in Aleppo Vilayet, now Hatay Province, Turkey. (Bagradian's character was inspired by the figure of Moses Der Kalousdian, whose Armenian first name was the same as that of the mountain.) His view is dominated by a familiar and looming presence in this paradisiac landscape—Musa Dagh—which means Mount Moses in Turkish (Musa Ler is the Armenian for Mount Moses). He thinks about his return to settle the affairs of his dead older brother and entertains pleasant reveries of his childhood, as well as more serious matters. Bagradian feels both proud and estranged from his Armenian roots, and throughout the novel Werfel develops this theme of estrangement, which is denoted with the book's first sentence, the question: ″How did I get here?″ Bagradian also considers his French wife Juliette and their son Stephan, and how they will adjust to their new environment, given the state of war that now exists and prevents their return.

Other important characters are introduced in Book One: Juliette, Stephan and the many Armenian characters—chief, among them the Gregorian head priest, Ter Haigasun; the local physician, Dr. Altouni; the apothecary–polymath Krikor and the Greek American journalist, Gonzague Maris—all characters drawn from Armenian survivors of the events of 1915, as well as from Werfel's family, friends, acquaintances and himself. Indeed, he personally informs several characters ranging from the assimilated outsider-hero (Bagradian) to self-parody (the schoolteacher Oskanian).

Bagradian considers himself a loyal citizen of the Ottoman Empire, even a patriot, eschewing the more radical Armenian parties, such as the socialist Hunchaks. He had served as an artillery officer in the First Balkan War of 1912, had been involved in the progressive wing of Turkish politics and had been a vocal Armenian supporter of the CUP and the Young Turk Revolution of 1908. Being a reserve officer, Bagradian becomes suspicious when he is not called up; learning that Turkish authorities have seized the internal passports of Armenian citizens further fuels his suspicions. So he goes to the district capital of Antioch (now Antakya), to inquire about his military status. In a local hamam (bathhouse), he overhears a group of Turks, among them the district governor, the Kaimikam, discussing the central government's plan to do something about its "Armenian problem". Bagradian was alarmed by what he heard. The danger, given the history of atrocities committed on Armenians, and their rise as the empire's chief professional and mercantile class, had alarmed Turkish nationalists. The dangers that this poses to his family are corroborated by an old friend of the Bagradian family, Agha Rifaat Bereket, a pious dervish (Sufi Muslim ascetic) who sees the Young Turks as apostates.

Back in Yoghonoluk, Bagradian begins to socialize with the Armenian community. His grandfather had a paternal relationship with the Armenian villages that dot the land around Musa Dagh, a role that Gabriel Bagradian assumes, not intending to be a real leader but rather to help his French wife adapt to what could be a long exile in the Turkish Levant.

Despite the rumors of arrests and deportations, trickling in from Constantinople (Istanbul) and other Ottoman cities, many of Musa Dagh's Armenians remain unconcerned about the outside world. It is not until four refugees arrive in Yoghonoluk in late April, that the full nature of what the Ottoman government is doing becomes clear, for the refugees bring news of the brutal suppression of an Armenian uprising, in the city of Zeitun and the mass deportation that followed. In a long passage, Werfel tells the story of Zeitun and introduces three more important characters of the book, the Protestant pastor Aram Tomasian, his pregnant wife Hovsannah, his sister Iskuhi, a quasi-feral orphan girl named Sato, and a houseboy named Kevork. Kevork, as a child, had suffered brain damage at the hands of the Turks. Iskuhi is the victim of a more recent atrocity: Her left arm is paralyzed from fending off a rape attempt. Despite her deformity, the Armenian girl's beauty and eyes attract Bagradian.

The story the refugees tell causes Bagradian and the Armenians who live around Musa Dagh to consider seriously resisting the Ottomans. Bagradian steps forward to assess the strengths and weaknesses of the villages and looks to the natural defenses of Musa Dagh and its environs. Ter Haigasun becomes his ally, in convincing the Armenian villagers of the peril.

Book One introduces a German Protestant missionary Johannes Lepsius, a real person, and Enver Pasha, the Ottoman War Minister, who with Talaat Pasha and Djemal Pasha (the Three Pashas), constitute the triumvirate that ruled the Ottoman Empire. The chapter, titled ″Interlude of the Gods,″ reveals the Turkish point of view vis-à-vis the Armenians and the West. Werfel intended his depiction, almost entirely drawn verbatim from Lepsius's published account, to be sympathetic and damning, especially when Enver consults with Talaat on the progress of the deportations.

"My reports of Zeitun differ from those of Your Excellency.″ Lepsius planted this blow in hesitant syllables. ″My accounts make no mention of any revolt of the population there but of provocative oppression lasting over a period of months by the district and sanjak officials. They speak of some trifling disorder, which could easily have been checked by strengthening the town police, whereas any fair-minded person can easily perceive a deliberate intention in military reinforcements of more than a thousand strong.″

″You've been given false information.″ Enver was still quietly well behaved. ″May I inquire who your informants were, Herr Lepsius?″

″I can name a few of them, but I may as well say that no Armenian sources are included. On the other hand I have the specific memoranda of various German consuls, reports from missionaries, the eyewitnesses of the worst atrocities. And finally I've been given a most consistent account of the whole business by the American ambassador, Mr. Morgenthau.″

″Mr. Morgenthau″ said Enver brightly, ″is a Jew. And Jews are always fanatically on the side of minorities.″

— from The Forty Days of Musa Dagh, pp. 139–140

The remainder of Book One describes which Armenians decide on resistance and which on cooperating with the deportation order. Bagradian camps out with his family and friends on Musa Dagh, to ensure that it is the right place to make a stand. Those who decide to resist, dig up a cache of rifles left over from the revolution of 1908, when they were allies of the Young Turks and subsequently bury their church bells, so that these do not fall into Turkish hands. Eventually, the Ottoman military police, the dreaded saptiehs, arrive led by the red-haired müdir. They instruct the Armenians to prepare for deportations—and then leave after beating Ter Haigasun and Bagradian. Instead of complying, the 6,000 Armenians march with everything they can carry, their animals and their weapons to a plateau on Musa Dagh. Bagradian hangs behind and observes the wailing women and the other graveyard folk—who represent the old ways and sympathetic magic of pagan Armenia—sacrifice a goat. Its meaning is propitious as well as cautionary. The chapter ends with Bagradian helping Krikor carry the last volumes of his magnificent if eclectic library to the Damlayik, the plateau the Armenians have chosen as their refuge.

=== Book Two: The Struggle of the Weak ===
Book Two opens during the high summer of 1915, with the establishment of the Armenian encampment and defenses, the Town Enclosure, Three Tent Square, South Bastion, Dish Terrace and other sites on Musa Dagh that became familiar place names during the course of the novel. A division of labor is established, as to who will fight, who will care for livestock, who will make guns and munitions and so on. A communal society is established, despite the objections of the propertied class. The objective is to hold out long enough to attract the ships of the British and French navies, patrolling the eastern Mediterranean in support of the Allied invasion of Gallipoli.

Characters who will figure in the defense of the mountain also come into more relief, such as the loner and Ottoman Army deserter Sarkis Kilikian (who suffered the loss of his entire family during the pogrom-like Hamidian massacres) and the former drillmaster, Chaush Nurhan. Indeed, Musa Dagh is presented as a microcosm of late nineteenth and early twentieth-century Armenian life, as well as being a test not only of Bagradian's leadership but a test of his marriage and fatherhood.

The Ottoman soldiers and saptiehs seriously underestimate the Armenians and their first engagement results in a Turkish rout. The victory forces the Turks to assemble a larger force; it enhances Bagradian's reputation, reconnects him to his people and isolates him from Juliette and Stephan.

Stephan reconnects with his Armenian roots but the difficulty he experiences because of his Westernized childhood, makes the novel a coming-of-age story, as well as a classic tale of love and war on the scale of Leo Tolstoy's War and Peace. He wants to be an authentic Armenian, like his rival Haik and other boys. To prove himself to them Stephan organizes a raid on a fruit orchard, to replenish the Armenians' stores and to prove himself to Iskuhi, for he is as much bewitched by her as his father. He leaves Musa Dagh to fetch back Iskuhi's bible, left behind in his father's deserted house. (A long passage left out of the first English translation.)

Juliette apprehends the growing estrangement of her husband and son, seeking purpose and solace in nursing the Armenian wounded and in her friendship with Gonzague Maris, which develops into a passionate affair. As the Turks resume their attacks, he tries to convince Juliette to abandon her family and the mountain. The battles include a heroic stand led by Kilikian, as well as Stephan's sniping attack on a Turkish gun emplacement. He and the other boys seize two field guns, a feat that forces the Turks to withdraw.

Book Two features a traditional funeral for the Armenian dead, including the ceremonies of the wailing women, who assist in the birth of Aram Tomasian's son, a difficult delivery that is seen as ominous while conditions in the camp start to deteriorate, for the Armenian victories can only buy time. Jemal Pasha is introduced in Book Two and is portrayed as a resentful member of the triumvirate, pathologically jealous of Enver. The relationship between Bagradian and Iskuhi also comes into focus, as it is conducted openly but only consummated on a spiritual plane. Their love is interrupted by a reinforced Ottoman attack, which is repelled. Bagradian orders a massive forest fire, to surround the Armenian encampment with a no-man's land of fire, smoke, and open terrain. Book Two ends with Sato exposing Juliette and Gonzague making love, Juliette coming down with typhus and Gonzague's escape. Stephan leaves the camp with Haik, on a mission to contact the American envoy in Antioch.

=== Book Three: Disaster, Rescue, The End ===
The scene changes to Constantinople and Johannes Lepsius's meeting with members of a dervish order called the ″Thieves of the Heart.″ It was important to Werfel to show that the Young Turks and the Three Pashas did not represent Turkish society. It was also important to show that Enver was right on certain points on the Western powers, which had exploited Turkey and treated it throughout the nineteenth century as a virtual colony. Most of the first chapter of Book Three is written as a dramatic dialogue, during which Lepsius witnesses the Sufi whirling devotions and learns first-hand about the deep resentment against the West—especially Western "progress" as instituted by the Young Turks—and the atrocities in concentration camps set up in the Mesopotamian desert for deported Armenians. He also encounters Bagradian's friend, Agha Rifaat Bereket. The latter agrees to bring supplies to Musa Dagh, purchased with funds collected by Lepsius in Germany. The episode ends with Lepsius witnessing Enver and Talaat being driven past in a limousine. When the car suffers two loud tire punctures, Lepsius at first thinks they have been assassinated (which foreshadows the real deaths of Talaat and Djemal by Armenian assassins).

The chapter that follows resumes with Stephan and Haik. They encounter the inshaat taburi, notorious forced labor details composed of Armenian draftees into the Ottoman Army and travel through a swamp, where Stephan and Haik form a real friendship. It is cut short, when Stephan falls ill; he is cared for by a Turkmen farmer, another of the righteous Muslims that Werfel represents in The Forty Days of Musa Dagh. Too sick to continue on the mission to Antioch, Stephan is returned to Yoghonoluk, which has been resettled by Muslim refugees, from war zones of the Ottoman Empire. Stephan is discovered to be Bagradian's son and a spy and is brutally murdered.

Stephan′s death causes Bagradian to withdraw for a time, during which Turkish soldiers capture the last of the Armenian livestock. This disaster opens rifts in Musa Dagh′s society and resolve. Other setbacks follow; with the arrival of a seasoned Ottoman general from the Gallipoli front, as well as reinforcements from the regular army. The Ottomans begin to tighten the noose around Musa Dagh. Bagradian recovers from his grief, to form guerrilla bands to disrupt the Ottoman advance and buy more time. No ships have been sighted and attempts to contact the Allies or to seek the diplomatic intercession of the United States, still a neutral power, or Turkey's ally, Imperial Germany, come to naught.

Bagradian derives strength and comfort from Iskuhi, who has volunteered to care for Juliette. Iskuhi sees the end coming and the likelihood that their love entails dying together, not a life. When the Agha′s mission arrives, he finds the Armenians starving. He can do little though, since the red-haired müdir has confiscated most of the supplies that were intended for the Armenians as a humanitarian gesture, approved by Turkey's highest religious authority. The camp, filled with smoke from the forest fires, inspires a vision in him that anticipates the Holocaust and the death camps of the Second World War.

The Armenian camp and resistance faces its greatest challenge from within, when criminal elements among the Ottoman Army deserters—whom Bagradian allowed to help in Musa Dagh's offense—go on a rampage. As Ter Haigasun prepares to celebrate a mass to ask for God's help, the deserters set the altar on fire and the resulting conflagration destroys much of the Town Enclosure, before the uprising is suppressed by Bagradian's men.

The Ottomans see the fire and prepare for the final assault. Oskanian leads a suicide cult, for those who do not want to die in enemy hands, given the Turks′ reputation for violent reprisals. The little teacher refuses to jump off a cliff, after fending off the last of his followers. Soon after, he discovers the large Red Cross distress flag, the Armenians flew to attract Allied ships and sights the French cruiser Guichen in the fog. It had diverted course after its watch spotted the burning of the Armenian camp on Musa Dagh. As Oskanian waves the flag, the warship begins shelling the coast. Soon more ships come. The Turks withdraw and the Armenians are rescued.

Bagradian remains behind after ensuring that the people he led, Juliette and Iskuhi are safely aboard the French and British ships. His reasons are complex and can be traced throughout the novel to the realization that he cannot leave and go into exile again in an internment camp in Port Said, Egypt. He now imagines that Iskuhi follows him back up Musa Dagh from the sea. On the way, he experiences a divine presence and confronts the cross on his son's grave. He is followed by a skirmishing party of Turkish troops. They approach in a crescent—which alludes to the battle formations of the Ottoman armies of the past—and kill him.

== Background ==
Werfel had previous military experience in Galicia and used his knowledge when writing battle scenes.

== Characters ==
=== Fictional ===
- Gabriel Bagradian - An Armenian from the local village who was raised in France.
- Juliette Bagradian - Gabriel's French wife. She experiences an illness but survives and is taken on the ship to Port Said.
- Stephan Bagradian - Gabriel's young son who defends the village and is killed by Turkish soldiers.
- Sarkis Kilikian - Born in Dörtyol, travelled through the Caucasus, nicknamed "The Russian".
- Ter Haigasun - Orthodox priest who convinces the villagers to resist the deportation orders.
- Gonsague Maris - A Greek adventurer with an American passport who seduces Juliette.
- Agha Rifaat Bereket - Turkish friend of the Bagradian family who is a religious mystic and warns Gabriel of the impending danger.
- Aram Tomasian - Protestant priest from Zeitun.
- Hovsanna Tomasian - Aram's wife.
- Iskuhi Tomasian - Aram's younger sister who feels attracted to Gabriel.
- Samuel Awakian - Stephan's teacher.
- Altouni - Doctor.
- Krikor - Apothecary.
- Sato - Gipsy woman.
- Hrand Oskanian - School teacher in conflict with Ter Haigasun
- Ali Risa - Turkish military officer.
- Brisson - French sea captain.

=== Historical ===
- Dr. Johannes Lepsius - German protestant missionary who attempts to intervene with Ottoman officials to stop the deportations.
- Enver Pasha - military officer.
- Talaat Pasha - military officer.
- Djemal Pasha - military officer.
- Abdul Hamid II - sultan.

== Release ==
=== Initial reception and censorship ===
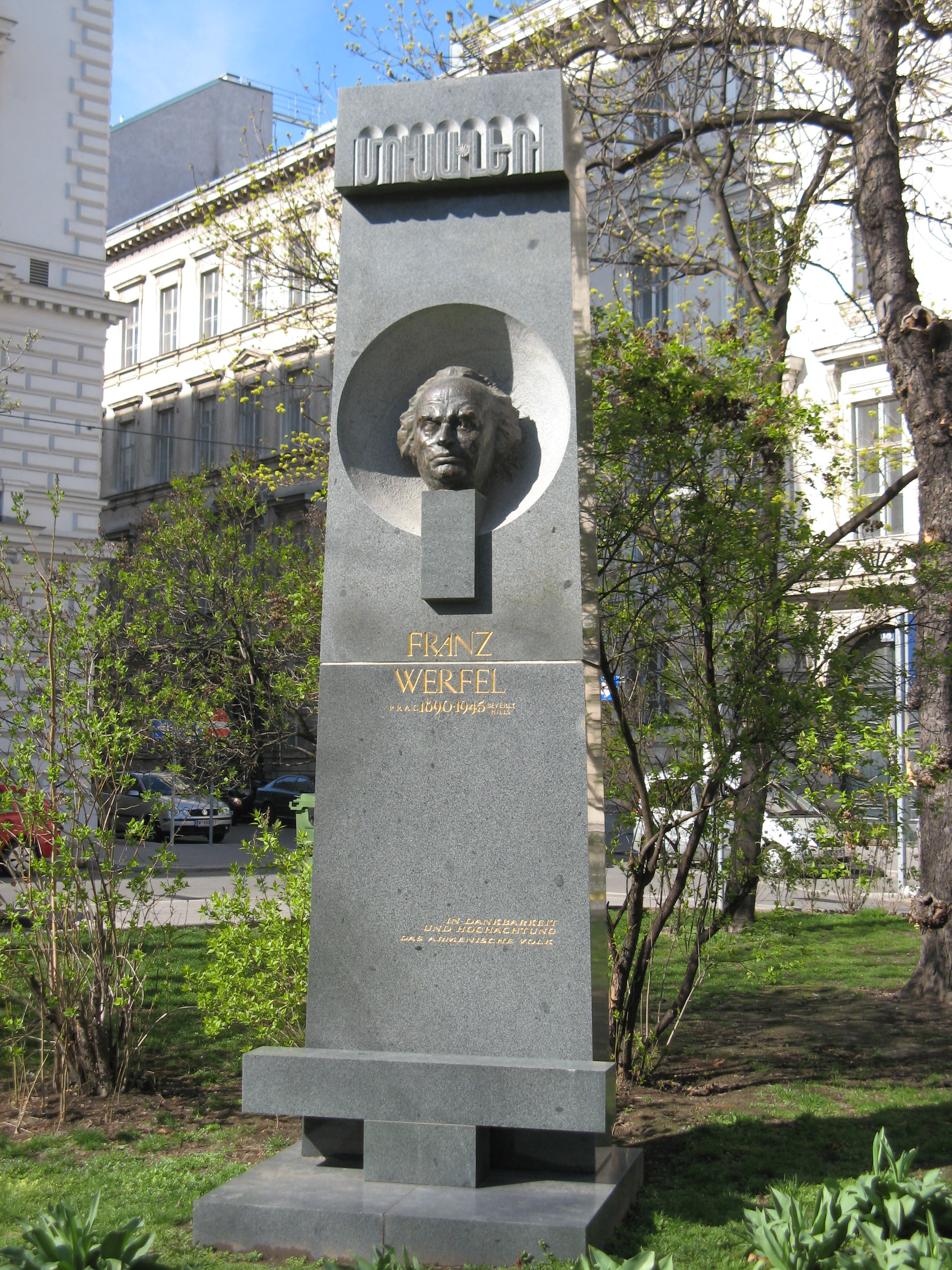
Memorial to Franz Werfel by Ohan Petrosian in Schiller Park in Vienna. The granite pillar carries the inscription: "In gratitude and respect. The Armenian people."

The Forty Days of Musa Dagh received much critical praise from Austrian and Swiss reviewers when the book, over 900 pages long, was published in two volumes in November 1933. For several years the novel could be read in Nazi Germany despite book burnings that included Werfel's previous titles and the increasing number of proscribed Jewish authors and their books. In February 1934, with strong pressure by the Turkish government in Ankara, The Forty Days of Musa Dagh was banned in the Third Reich. Das Schwarze Korps, the official newspaper of the SS, painted Werfel as an agent who created the "alleged Turkish horrors perpetrated against the Armenians" and also denounced "America's Armenian Jews for promoting in the U.S.A. the sale of Werfel's book." Through a decree issued by Prime Minister İsmet İnönü in January 1935, the book was banned in Turkey. It was translated into Turkish and published in Turkey only in 1997, by Belge Publishing House under the name Musa Dağ'da Kırk Gün.

Werfel was devastated by the loss of his German readership, but the novel was soon published in an English translation in November 1934, which sold 34,000 copies in the first two weeks. This translation by Geoffrey Dunlop omitted scenes of violence and rape that Dunlop believed would cause anxiety in readers in the United States and the United Kingdom and descriptions of the culture and society of the Armenians. According to Neal Ascherson, Werfel was only interested in collecting the royalties paid from the translations and that otherwise he did not care what happened to the English version, and that the public at the time did not draw attention to the abridgement.

Louis Kronenberger, the editor of the New York Times Book Review described The Forty Days of Musa Dagh as "A story which must rouse the emotions of all human beings ... Werfel has made it a noble novel. Unlike most other important novels, Musa Dagh is richest in story, a story of men accepting the fate of heroes ... It gives us the lasting sense of participation in a stirring episode of history. Magnificent." Kronenberger also recognized the novel's filmic qualities: "If Hollywood does not mar and mishandle it, it should make a magnificent movie."

Few realized that the English translation had been abridged to fit one volume and that controversial passages had been omitted, to streamline the narrative and make the book less offensive to readers. Other translations, among the 34 produced were also redacted. The book was never censored in a way that placated the Turkish government, which felt Werfel misrepresented what had happened in 1915. The Forty Days of Musa Dagh posed a small public relations disaster for the modern, secular Republic of Turkey of its president, Mustafa Kemal Atatürk, who sought to distance Turkey from the old Ottoman past and the Young Turks who lost most of the empire during First World War. A film version posed an even greater threat.

=== Importance to Armenians, Jews, and other victims of genocide ===
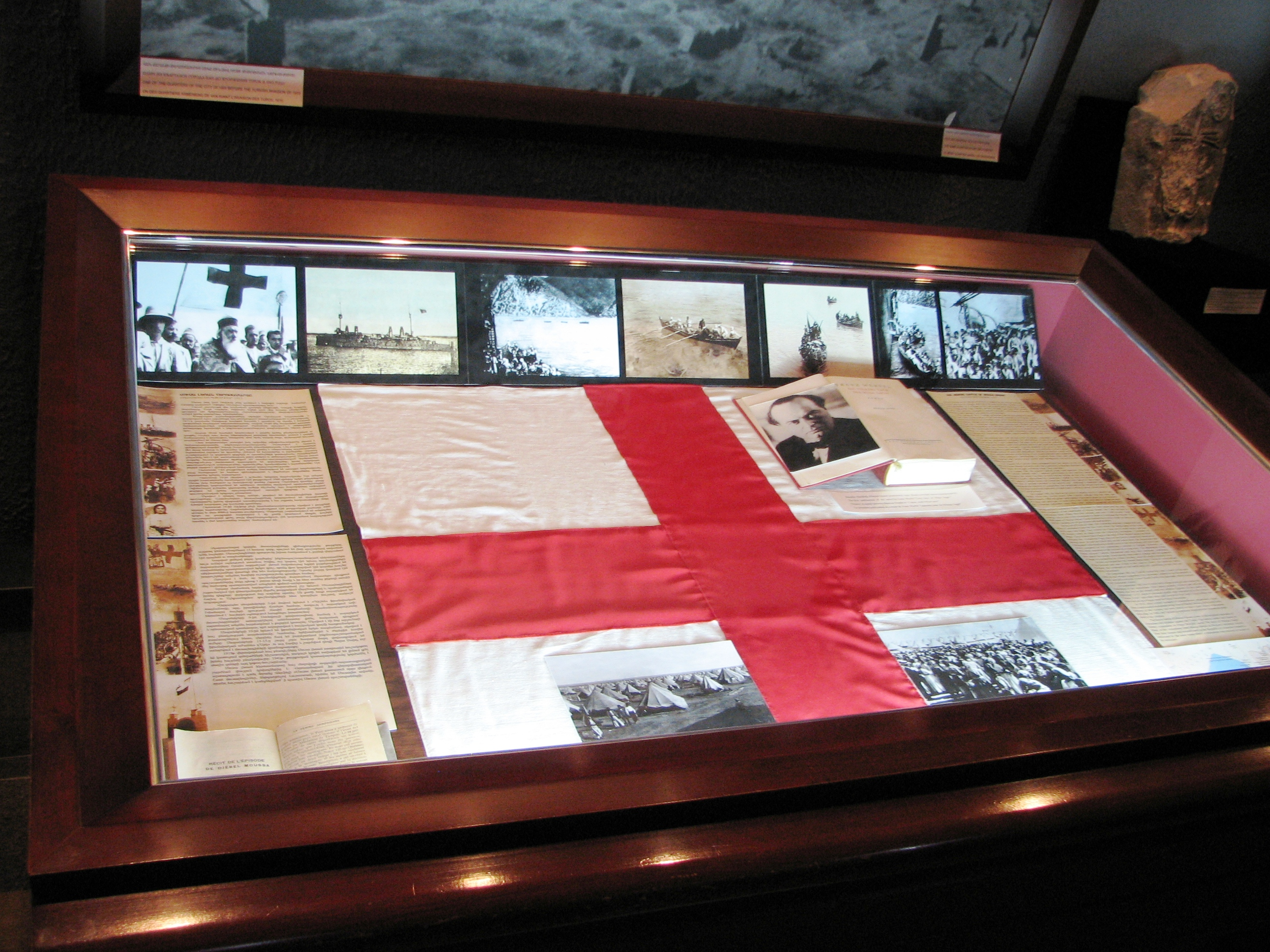
An exhibit dedicated to the siege and the novel at the Armenian Genocide Museum in Yerevan, Armenia.

Werfel's novel made him famous among Armenians, according to his biographer, Peter Stephan Jungk. Citing Father Bezdikian, an Armenian priest living in Venice, Italy whose grandfather served and fought during the siege: "Franz Werfel is the national hero of the Armenian people. His great book is a kind of consolation to us—no, not a consolation, there is no such thing—but it is of eminent importance to us that this book exists. It guarantees that it can never be forgotten, never, what happened to our people." Ascherson stated: "For Armenians, it remains unique and precious: for all its minor inaccuracies, it's the one work whose urgency and passion keeps the truth of their genocide before the eyes of a world that would prefer to forget about it."

Many Armenians in the Diaspora read the abridged English edition for years, which lacked many of the scenes of Armenian life. With these scenes restored in the revised and expanded edition of 2012, the novel's meaning to Armenians is all the more poignant, as Vartan Gregorian writes in the preface: "The Forty Days of Musa Dagh was meant as a memorial set against a new historical phenomenon that had been described as the murder of a nation, the extermination of a race, and the assassination of Armenia ... ". The novel, in its expanded form, has even more relevance as a document of genocide. "[I]t is truly remarkable," continues Gregorian, "to consider how closely The Forty Days of Musa Dagh foreshadows the cataclysm that would befall the Jews of Germany and Eastern Europe at the hands of the Nazis." As historian and scholar Yair Auron writes, "The reader of this extraordinary novel will find it difficult to believe that the book was written before the Holocaust."

Not all Armenians could express their support for the book; some were forced to protest against its publication and any attempt to turn it into a movie, notably the surviving Armenian community of Istanbul denounced Werfel's book and burned it in a public ritual, similar to contemporary Nazi book burning ceremonies in Germany and elsewhere. A group of Armenians gathered around in the courtyard of Istanbul's Pangalti Armenian Church and set fire to copies of the book. As a final symbolic humiliation imposed upon them, they were made to not only renounce the author but also reject the book's content, effectively denouncing themselves and denying their own history. The Jewish community of Istanbul similarly denounced Werfel in 1934. According to Ascherson, the Armenian and Jewish communities in Istanbul were coerced into criticizing the novel.

Jews worldwide welcomed The Forty Days of Musa Dagh and readily saw the parallels Werfel (himself Jewish) had drawn between them and the Armenians, especially the resentment and persecution both societies endured in the nineteenth century, when each benefited and suffered from governmental liberalization policies and the economic success that such policies engendered along with the Industrial Revolution. The old Armenian saying in the novel—"To be an Armenian is an impossibility"—resonated with Jews living in Europe and Palestine.

The novel's importance grew during the Second World War. Musa Dagh has often been compared to resistance in Jewish ghettos. Marcel Reich-Ranicki wrote that it was the most-read book in the Warsaw ghetto. The Białystok Ghetto population found itself in a similar situation as Musa Dagh, in February 1943, when Mordecai Tannenbaum, an inmate of the Vilna Ghetto, was sent with others to organize resistance there. The record of one of the meetings organizing the revolt, suggests that the novel was used as a guide for resistance: "Only one thing remains for us: to organize collective resistance in the ghetto, at any cost; to consider the ghetto our 'Musa Dagh', to write a proud chapter of Jewish Białystok and our movement into history" noted Tannenbaum. Copies of the novel were said to have been "passed from hand to hand" among the ghetto defenders who likened their situation to that of the Armenians. According to extensive statistical records kept by Herman Kruk at the Vilna Ghetto library, the book was the most popular among ghetto readership, as is recounted in memoirs by survivors who worked at the library.

Many Jews in the Palestinian Mandate contemplated retreating to Mount Carmel and organizing a defense line, due to prospects of a Nazi invasion of the region. Known alternatively as the "Northern Program", "The Carmel Plan", "The Massada Plan", and the "Musa Dagh Plan", it was envisioned as a bastion against Nazi incursions, to hold out for at least three to four months. Meri Batz, one of the leaders of the Jewish militias who had also read the novel, stated that the community wished to "turn Carmel into the Musa Dagh of Palestinian Jewry ... We put our faith in the power of the Jewish 'Musa Dagh' and were determined to hold out for at least three to four months."

=== Revised translation ===
James Reidel revised the Dunlop translation by including all of the material previously removed, and this new edition was published in the United States and the United Kingdom, with UK publishing occurring in 2018. Penguin Books did not include the introduction in the UK edition, something Ascherson criticized.

== Historical notes ==
The Armenian resistance on Musa Dagh lasted, contrary to the book's title, for 53 days. The change of the days by Werfel "called up biblical associations: the flood lasted forty days and nights; Moses spent forty days and nights on Mount Sinai; Israel's time in the wilderness was forty years."

Werfel's account of the French navy's role in the evacuation of Musa Dagh in September 1915 is based on official French diplomatic and naval archives that he secured through contacts at the French embassy in Vienna. Those ships that took part are accurately named, and included the French protected cruiser Guichen under Commander Jean-Joseph Brisson and the armored cruiser Jeanne D'Arc under the command of Vice-Admiral Louis Dartige du Fournet, who received a posthumous medal from the French government in October 2010 for his role in transporting the 4,000 people left on the Damlayik to Port Said, Egypt.

Werfel's Bagradian was inspired by the town's defense leader, Moses Der Kalousdian. Unlike Bagradian, he survived the siege and moved to Beirut, Lebanon several years after the war and lived there for the next 70 years, becoming a doctor and serving in Lebanon's government for several decades as a quiet and shy member of Parliament. Derkalousdian died at the age of 99 in 1986.

== Film adaptation ==
=== Objections and obstructions of initial attempts ===
Before The Forty Days of Musa Dagh was published in English, Irving Thalberg of Metro-Goldwyn-Mayer (MGM) secured the film rights from Werfel's publisher, Paul Zsolnay Verlag and had the novel translated for the studio scriptwriters. Despite reservations on the part of legal counsel, who felt such a film would offend the Turkish government, MGM started pre-production work in 1934 and tentatively cast a rising young star named Clark Gable to play Gabriel Bagradian. When reports surfaced in the Hollywood press about the film late in 1934, Turkey's ambassador to the United States, Mehmed Münir Ertegün, was ordered by his government to prevent it from being made. As the successor state of the Ottoman Empire, Turkey was intent on suppressing any mention of the Armenian Genocide.

Ertegün turned to the U.S. State Department and told it that he "earnestly hoped that [the movie studio] would desist from presenting any such picture, which would give a distorted version of the alleged massacres." The State Department tried to assure Ertegün that the film would not include any material that would offend Turkey but Ertegün remained adamant. The State Department attempted to mollify the Turkish government by presenting it with the final script, although this did not satisfy it either. The scriptwriters offered several watered-down versions but the Turkish government refused to budge.

MGM's production chief was astonished by this level of interference by a foreign power, declaring, ″To hell with the Turks, I'm going to make the picture anyway.″ The fact that MGM planned to move forward with the production further enraged Turkey. Speaking to an MGM official, Ertegün threatened that ″If the movie is made, Turkey will launch a worldwide campaign against it. It rekindles the Armenian Question. The Armenian Question is settled.″ Ertegün′s threats were soon being echoed across the Turkish press. In a September 3, 1935 editorial, colored with anti-Semitic overtones, the Istanbul Turkish-language daily Haber opined:

We will have to take our own steps in case the Jewish people fail to bring the Jewish company (MGM) to reason . . . The Forty Days of Musa Dagh presents the Turco-Armenian struggle during the World War in a light hostile to the Turks. Its author is a Jew. This means that MGM, which is also a Jewish firm, utilizes for one of its films a work by one of its companions . . . Declare a boycott against pictures by MGM . . . Jewish firms which maintain commercial relations with our country will also suffer if they fail to stop this hostile propaganda.

In the face of this pressure, Louis B. Mayer of MGM, conceded to Turkish demands and the film was scrapped. Michael Bobelian, a lawyer and a journalist, observes that the ″Musa Dagh incident is critical in understanding the evolution of Turkey's campaign of denying the crimes committed by the Young Turks ... The standoff with MGM revealed that Turkey would pressure foreign governments to go along with its policy of denial.″

In the early 1960s, an English publisher, Gordon Landsborough, attempted to produce a film version of the book and wrote a film treatment for it. When he discovered that MGM still held the film rights he attempted to buy them but was unsuccessful as MGM announced their interest in filming it, using a script by Carl Foreman. Landsborough wrote in 1965 of rumours of political pressure holding up that new MGM production. Another movie version was mentioned in the 1967 sales film Lionpower from MGM, as being slated for production in 1968–1969 but nothing came of this version either.

=== 1982 film ===
In the 1970s MGM sold its rights to The Forty Days of Musa Dagh and after several abortive attempts, the novel was finally turned into a movie in 1982, directed by Sarky Mouradian with screenplay by Alex Hakobian. It was a low-budget, low-profile production that seriously abridged the original.

=== Subsequent attempts and adaptations ===
In 2006, Sylvester Stallone expressed his desire to direct a film about Musa Dagh, according to Professor Savaş Eğilmez of Atatürk University. An e-mail campaign sponsored by the Armenian-genocide denying Foundation for the Struggle Against Baseless Allegations of Genocide (ASİMED), pressured Stallone into not proceeding with the film. In early 2009, reports surfaced that Mel Gibson was also considering directing a documentary and appearing in the adaptation of Werfel's novel but was dissuaded after receiving 3,000 e-mails from a Turkish pressure group.

In 2016, a feature film, The Promise, starring Christian Bale, appeared, which bears some resemblance to Werfel′s novel and draws from the same source material.

== See also ==
- Vakıflı
- Armenian genocide
- Anti-Armenianism
- Denial of the Armenian Genocide
- Zeitun rebellion (1895-96)
- Zeitun Resistance (1915)
