= Vakıflı, Samandağ =

Vakıflı Վաքըֆ Vak'ëf, Vakıfköy
- Neighbourhood
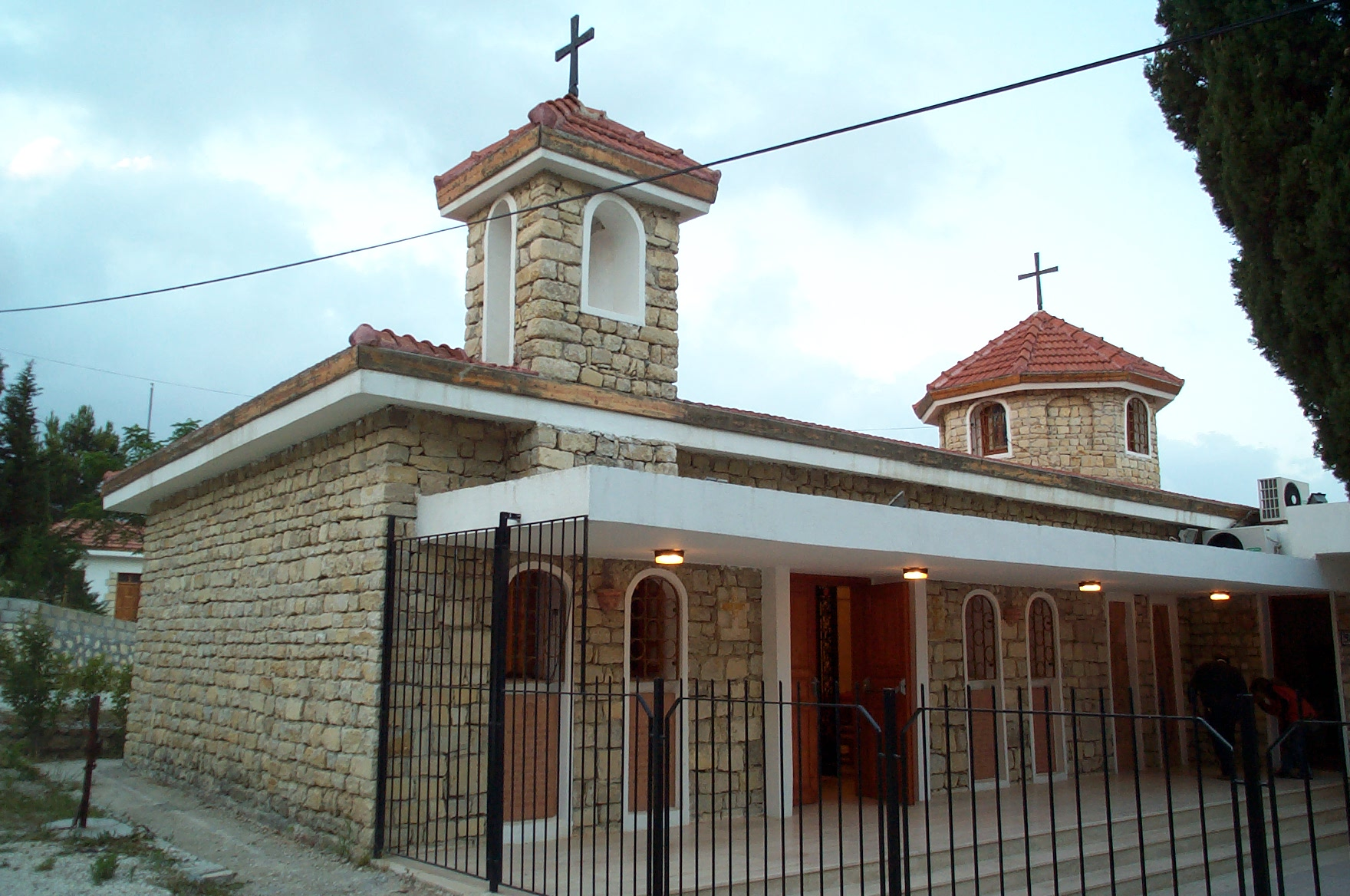
- Village Church

- Location within Turkey
- Coordinates: 36°06′53″N 35°58′31″E
- Country: Turkey
- Province: Hatay
- District: Samandağ
- Population (2022): 103
- Time zone: UTC+3 (TRT)

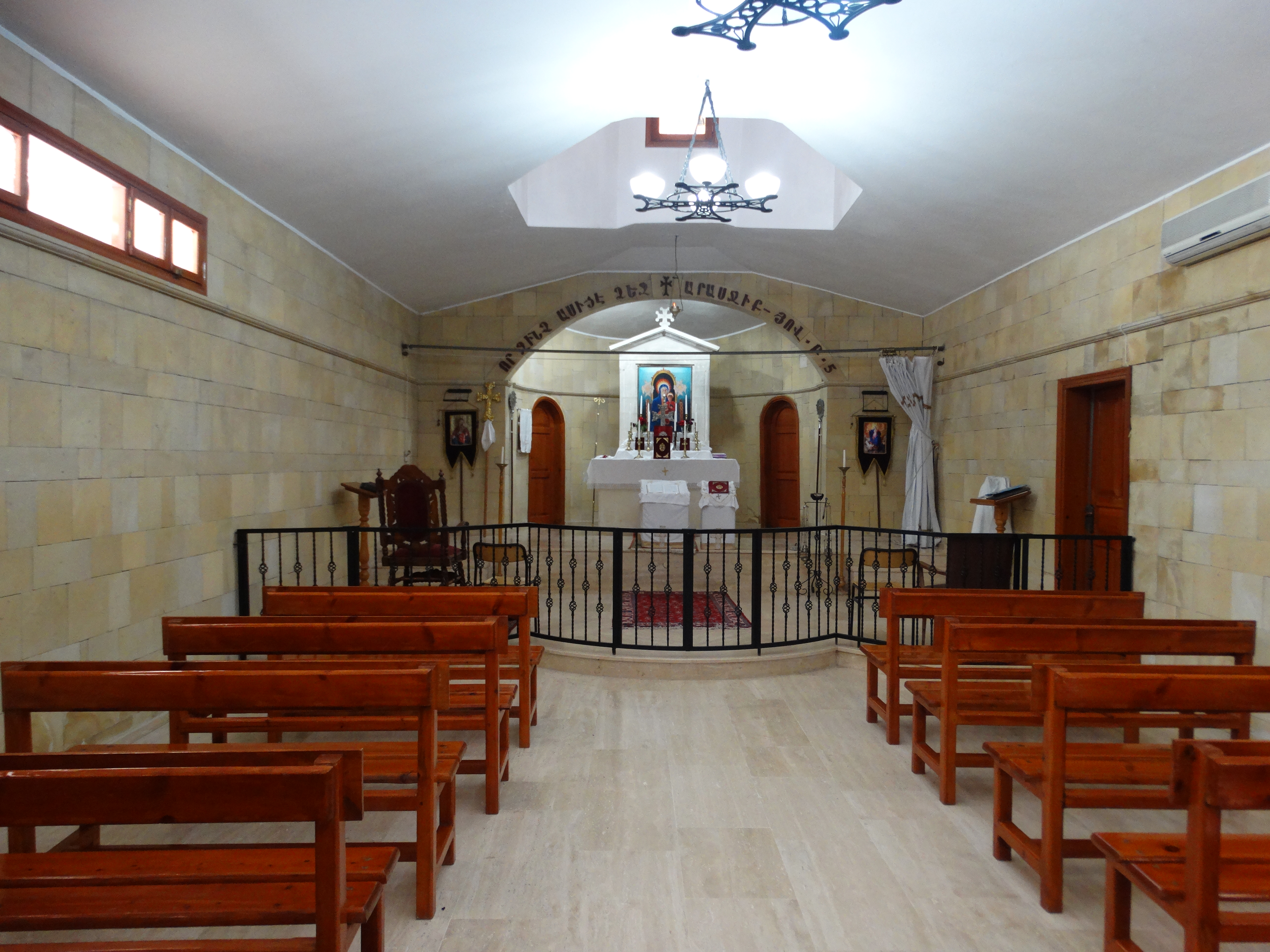
Internal view of the church

Vakıflı (Armenian: Վաքըֆ, romanized: Vak'ëf, pronounced [ˈvakʰəf], official name: Vakıfköy) is a neighbourhood of the municipality and district of Samandağ, Hatay Province, Turkey. Its population is 103 (2022). It is the only remaining Armenian village in Turkey. Located on the slopes of Musa Dagh in the Samandağ district of Hatay Province, the village overlooks the Mediterranean Sea and is within eyesight of the Syrian border. It is home to a community of about 130 Turkish-Armenians. The local Western Armenian dialect is highly divergent and cannot be fully understood by other Western Armenians.

== History ==
The residents of Vakıflı are the descendants of those Armenians who resisted the Armenian genocide of 1915 on Musa Dagh. For 53 days they repelled attacks by Turkish troops until French sailors sighted a banner that the Armenians had tied to a tree on the mountain emblazoned with the words "Christians in Distress: Rescue".^{[weak citation]}After being transported to Port Said by the French, the inhabitants of seven Armenian villages returned to their homes while Hatay was under French occupation starting from 1918. Following an agreement between France and Turkey and a controversial referendum, the district reverted to Turkey on 29 June 1939, a move still not recognized by Syria. After this move the populations of the other six Armenian villages emigrated out of Hatay settling in Lebanon's Beqaa Valley, especially Anjar, while the residents of Vakıflı chose to stay.

Vakıflı suffered from a lack of jobs until the mid-2000s, prompting the younger generation to move to Istanbul. An estimated 500 former residents of Vakıflı live in Istanbul, and the village population increases to around 300 during the summer as they visit. However, with the help of the district governor (kaymakam) and the TEMA Foundation, which identified ten villages and developed specific projects for each village to stop urban migration, Vakıflı was selected for development of organic farming and eco-tourism, and the village obtained the only EU organic farming certification in the region. In 2004, Vakıflı Village Cooperative exported organic oranges worth one million Euros, giving hope of economic viability to the village and prompting some villagers to move back from Istanbul.

Between 1994 and 1997, the village church was reconstructed and expanded with assistance from the Turkish government. In 2005, Vakıflı restored its old school building, turning it into a bed-and-breakfast, with two more old houses being converted to bed-and-breakfasts. With the help of the local government and the Association for Development of Vakıflı, an Istanbul-based organization, a project for ecotourism is being implemented that aims to restore the traditional stone houses of the village.

Vakıflı hosted 20 Syrian refugees of Armenian origin from Kesab during the Syrian civil war.

In February 2023, Vakıflı was heavily affected by the 2023 Hatay earthquake, with thirty of the village's 40 stone houses and the village church heavily damaged. However, no one died in the earthquake.

== Education ==
As of 2015 there is no school in the community. Children go to schools in other communities.

== See also ==
- Armenian-Turkish relations
- Armenians in Turkey
- The Forty Days of Musa Dagh
- Republic of Hatay
- Kesab
- List of Armenian ethnic enclaves
