= Emrah Karaçay =

Mayor of Samandağ since 2024

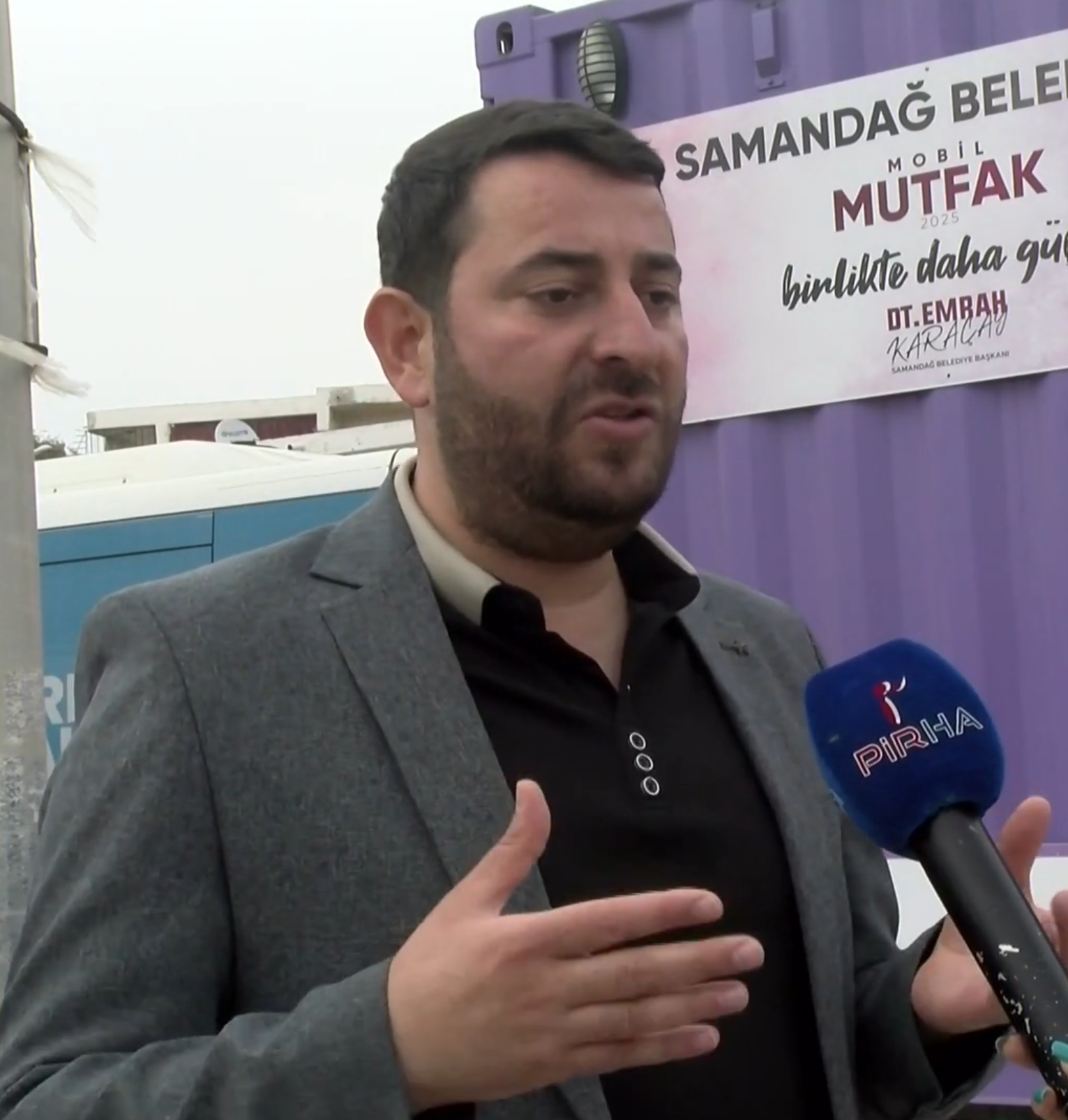
- Karaçay in 2025

Mayor of Samandağ
- Incumbent
- Assumed office 2024
- Preceded by: Refik Eryılmaz

Personal details
- Born: 1987 (age 38–39) Samandağ, Hatay Province, Turkey
- Party: Workers' Party of Turkey (TİP)
- Children: 3
- Education: Ondokuz Mayıs University
- Profession: Dentist
- Known for: Mayor of Samandağ

Emrah Karaçay (born 1987, Samandağ) is a Turkish dentist and politician, and the mayor of Samandağ since the 2024 Turkish local elections.

== Biography ==
Karaçay was born in 1987 in an Arab Alawite family in Samandağ, Hatay. There, he completed his primary, secondary, and high school education. He graduated from the Faculty of Dentistry at Samsun Ondokuz Mayıs University and later opened his own private practice in Samandağ, where he works as a dentist.

Karaçay is married and has three children.

== Career ==
Since 2019, he has been a member of the Workers' Party of Turkey (TİP). In the 2024 local elections, Emrah Karaçay was elected as the mayor of Samandağ and was the only candidate from the Workers' Party of Turkey to win a seat in this election. In this local election, the Communist Party of Turkey did not nominate its own candidate in the district and supported Karaçay instead.

In 2024, Emrah Karaçay initiated cleaning efforts in the Milleyha Wetland Area in the district. He announced that a camera system and observation towers would be established to protect the region's ecological balance. Additionally, municipal police teams intensified inspections against illegal hunting and unlicensed dumping of construction waste. Karaçay collaborated with birdwatchers and volunteers to work on the preservation of the area. In the same year, Karaçay made efforts to establish a natural gas infrastructure in the district.

== Views ==
Karaçay, who identifies himself as an Alawite, especially emphasizes his sensitivity regarding the rights and safety of this ethnic group in Syria following the regime change in the country. In an interview given in 2025, Karaçay stated that the new Syrian government is moving towards an Islamic Sharia regime. He finds the government's "moderate Islam" rhetoric unconvincing, and he highlights that figures like HTS leader al-Shara, despite claiming moderation, actually have much more radical roots.
