= Musa Dagh =

Part of the Armenian genocide

Coordinates: 36°15′30″N 35°54′13″E

Musa Dagh defense
- Part of the Armenian genocide
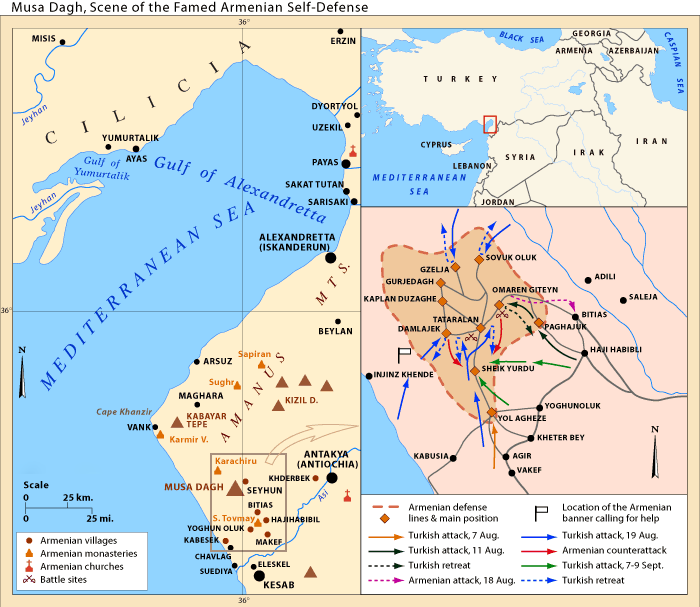
- Map of the Musa Dagh Armenian Self-Defense.
Date	July 21 – September 12, 1915 (1 month, 3 weeks and 1 day)
Location	Ottoman Empire
Result	Armenian victory Successful Armenian resistance Eventual rescue of Armenians by the French Navy

Belligerents
Ottoman Empire	Armenians

Commanders and leaders
Captain Rifaat Bey	Reverend Dikran Antreassian; Yesayi Yakhubian; Yesayi Aprahamian; Nerses Kazandjian; Movses Der-Kalustian

Strength
19,000 (4,000 regular troops and 15,000 fighters)	600 fighters 4,000 Armenian civilians

Casualties and losses
Unknown	18 fighters killed 12 injured

Musa Dagh (Turkish: Musa Dağı; Armenian: Մուսա լեռ, romanized: Musa leṛ; Arabic: جبل موسى, romanized: Jebel Musa; meaning "Moses Mountain") is a mountain in the Hatay Province of Turkey. In 1915, it was the location of a successful Armenian resistance to the Armenian genocide, an event that inspired Franz Werfel to write the novel The Forty Days of Musa Dagh.

== History ==
The deportation orders of the Armenian population of modern-day Turkey, issued by the Ottoman government, in July 1915 reached the six Armenian villages of the Musa Dagh region: Kabusie, (Note: Western Armenian: Քապուսիե, romanized: Kʿabusie; Turkish: Kapısuyu) Yoghunolukh, (Note: Western Armenian: Եօղունօլուխ, romanized: Yōghunōlukh; Turkish: Yoğunoluk) Bitias, (Note: Western Armenian: Պիթիաս, romanized: Bitʿias; Turkish: Batıayaz), Vakef, (Note: Western Armenian: Վաքըֆ, romanized: Vakʿěf; Turkish: Vakıflı) Khederbeg, (Note: Western Armenian: Խտըրպեկ, romanized: Khděrbeg; Turkish: Hıdırbey) and Haji-Habibli. (Note: Western Armenian: Հաճի-Հապիպլի, romanized: Haji-Habibli; Turkish: Hacı Habibli; present-day Eriklikuyu) As Ottoman Turkish forces converged upon the town, the populace, aware of the impending danger, refused deportation and fell back upon Musa mountain, thwarting assaults for fifty-three days, from July to September 1915. One of the leaders of the revolt was Movses Der Kalusdian, whose Armenian first name was the same as that of the mountain. French warships of the 3rd Squadron in the Mediterranean under command of Vice Admiral Louis Dartige du Fournet, sighted the survivors just as ammunition and food provisions were running out. Five French ships, beginning with the protected cruiser Guichen, under the command of Captain Jean-Joseph Brisson, evacuated 3,004 women and children and over 1,000 men from Musa Dagh to safety in Port Said. The other French ships were the seaplane carrier Foudre, the protected cruiser D'Estrées, and the armored cruisers Amiral Charner and Dupleix.

Starting in 1918, when the Sanjak of Alexandretta came under French control, the population of the six Armenian villages returned to their homes. In 1932, a monument was erected at the top of the mountain to commemorate the event.

The mountain was in Aleppo Vilayet, Ottoman Empire, until after World War I, when the French took possession and put it in Sanjak of Alexandretta, Mandate of Syria.

On 29 June 1939, following an agreement between France and Turkey, the province was given to Turkey. Afterwards Armenians from six of the villages emigrated from Hatay Province, while some residents of Vakıflı village chose to stay. Vakıflı is the only remaining ethnic Armenian village in Turkey, with a population of 140 Turkish-Armenians. Most who left Hatay in 1939 emigrated to Lebanon where they resettled in the town of Anjar. Today, the town of Anjar is divided into six districts, each commemorating one of the villages of Musa Dagh.

As the French squads came to the rescue of the survivors, the chief priest is quoted as having said, "The evil only happened... to enable God to show us His goodness." This event was depicted in The Promise, a 2016 American epic historical drama film directed by Terry George and starring Oscar Isaac, Charlotte Le Bon and Christian Bale, set in the final years of the Ottoman Empire.

== The Forty Days of Musa Dagh ==
These historical events later inspired Franz Werfel to write his novel The Forty Days of Musa Dagh (1933), a fictionalized account based on his detailed research of historical sources. Werfel told reporters: "The struggle of 5,000 people on Musa Dagh had so fascinated me that I wished to aid the Armenian people by writing about it and bringing it to the world". A movie of the same name was released in 1982. Six years after the novel was published, when Nazi Germany started conquering Europe, the copies of “The Forty Days of Musa Dagh” spread widely among young adults, some of whom found themselves in circumstances similar to those faced by Armenians. The book was popular in Warsaw ghetto and Vilna ghetto and when the Jewish resisters decided to fight back in the Bialystok ghetto, they spoke of the ghetto’s “Musa Dagh” moment at the planning meeting.

== Gallery ==
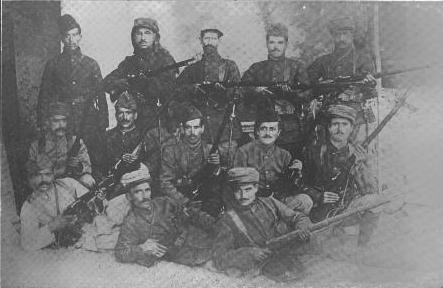
Armenian combatants in Musa Dagh

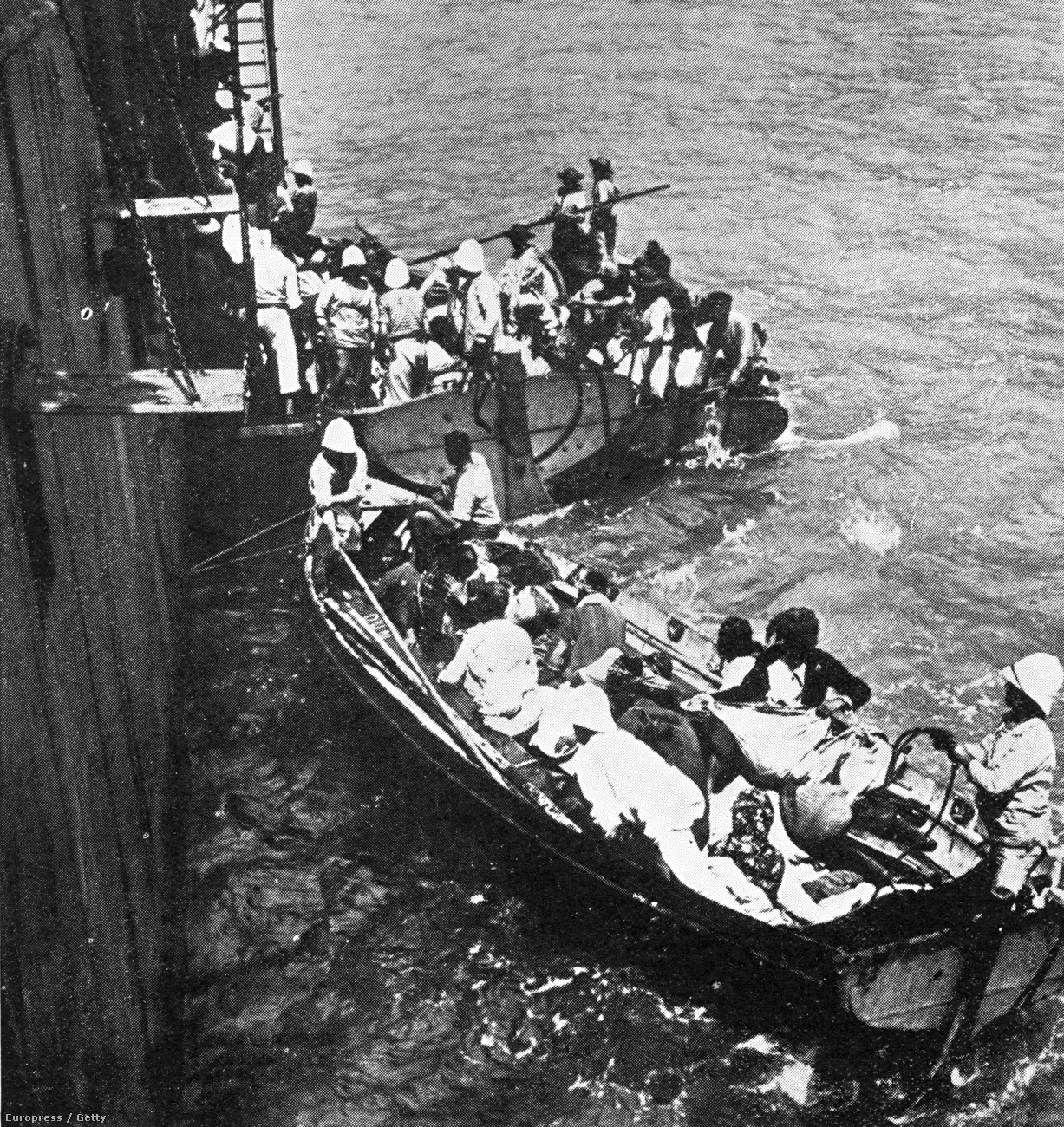
A French warship embarks Armenian refugees from Musa Dagh in September 1915.

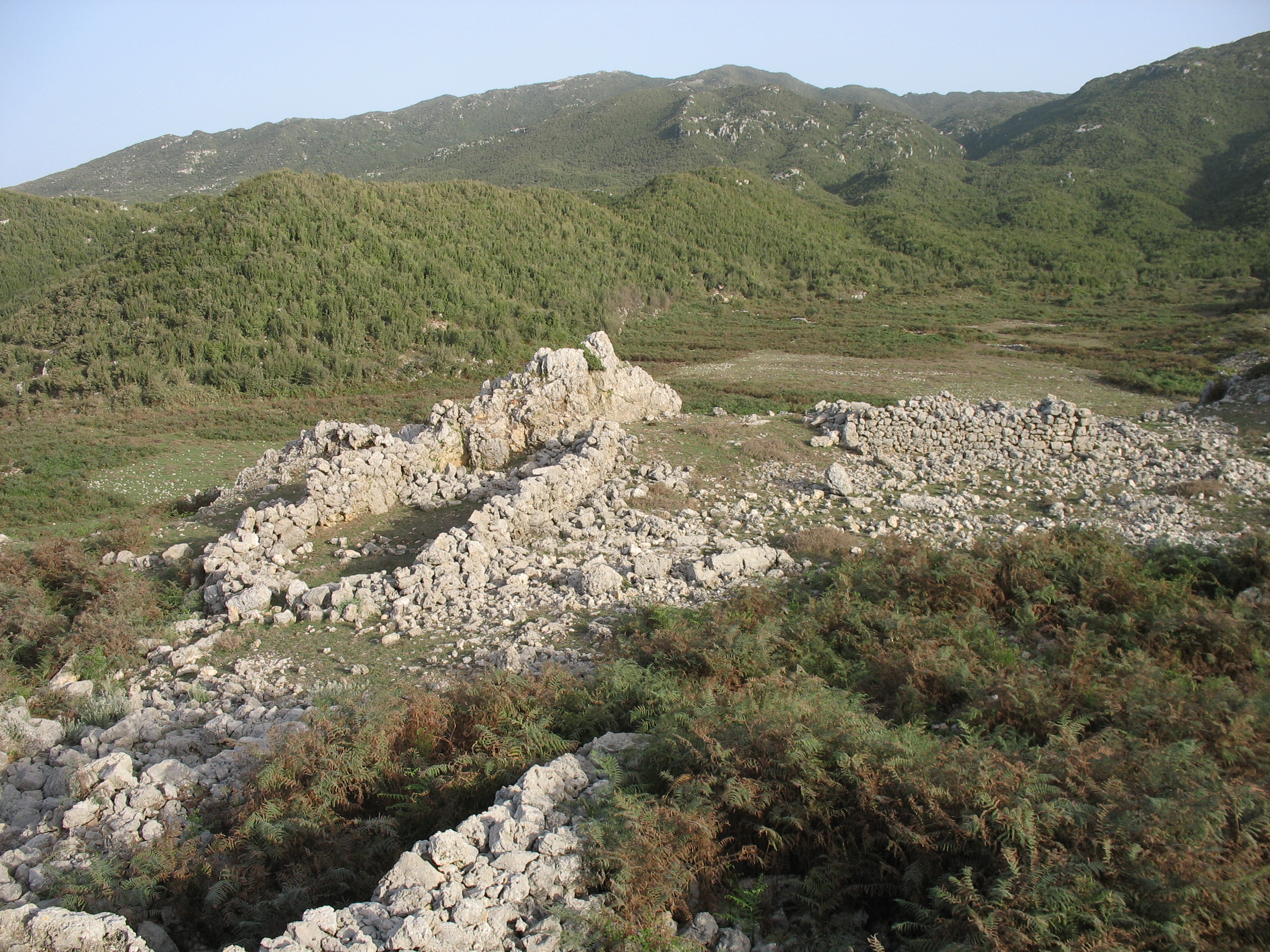
Location of the Armenian camp during the resistance.

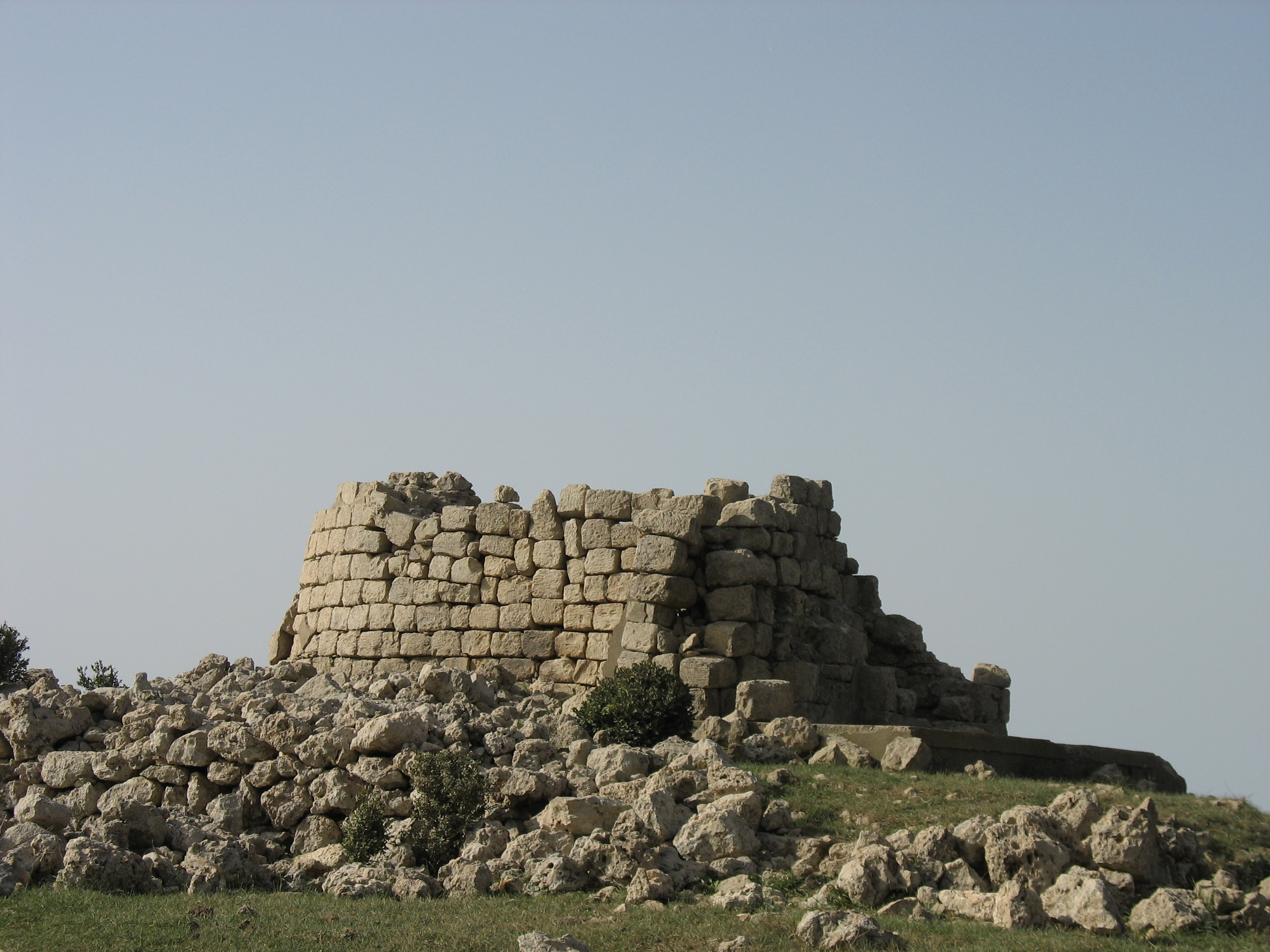
The remains of the monument near the top of Musa Dagh in memory of the French warships that rescued the Armenian people on 12 September 1915. Picture taken on 12 September 2015, the 100th anniversary of the rescue.

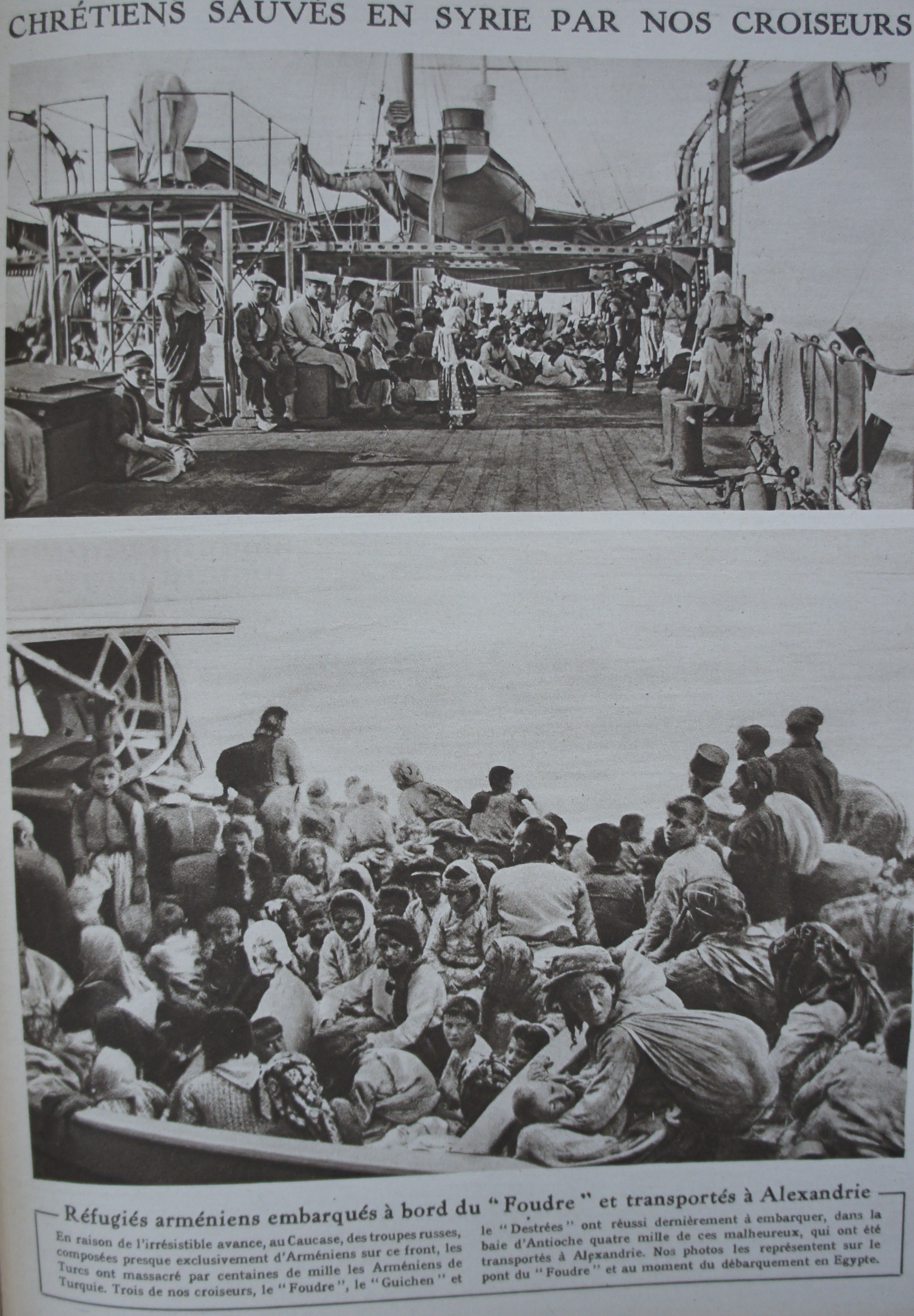
French magazine Le Miroir, 24 October 1915

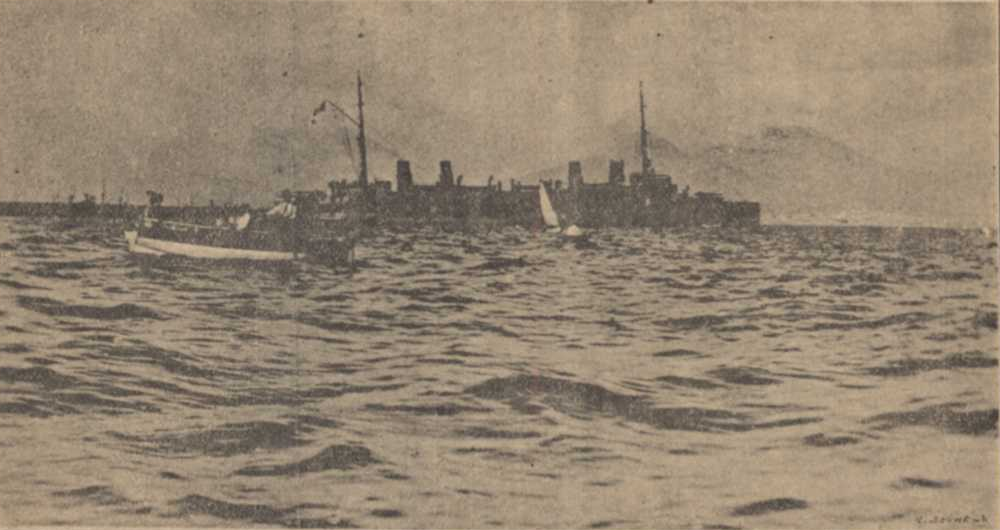
The French warship Guichen, pictured above, participated along with several cruisers in the rescue of some 4,000 Armenians who had taken shelter on Musa Dagh.

== See also ==
- Armenia–France relations
- The Forty Days of Musa Dagh
- Vakıflı
- The Promise, a 2016 film climaxing around the events of 1915 on Musa Dagh
- Kessab
