= Seldiren =

- Neighbourhood
- Location in Turkey
- Coordinates: 36°14′N 35°59′E
- Country: Turkey
- Province: Hatay
- District: Samandağ
- Elevation: 455 m (1,493 ft)
- Population (2022): 511
- Time zone: UTC+3 (TRT)
- Postal code: 31800
- Area code: 0326

Seldiren is a neighbourhood of the municipality and district of Samandağ, Hatay Province, Turkey. Its population is 511 (2022). It is in the forests of Nur (Amanus) Mountains. Distance to Samandağ is about 20 kilometres (12 mi). The village was founded in the early 1800s by people from north of Hatay Province. The main economic activity is agriculture and forestry.
