= The Forty Days of Musa Dagh (film) =

1982 American film

- Directed by: Sarky Mouradian
- Written by: Alex Hakobian
- Produced by: John Kurkjian
- Starring: Kabir Bedi; Ronnie Carol; Paul King; Guy Stockwell; Peter Haskell; Michael Constantine; David Mauro; David Opatoshu; Gilbert Greene; John Hoyt
- Cinematography: Gregory Sandor
- Edited by: Tony de Zarraga
- Music by: Jaime Mendoza-Nava
- Distributed by: Examco Inc.
- Release date: 1982
- Country: United States
- Language: English
- Budget: $1 million

The Forty Days of Musa Dagh is a 1982 American film produced by John Kurkjian, written by Alex Hakobian, and directed by Sarky Mouradian. It is an adaptation of the novel The Forty Days of Musa Dagh, about the resistance to the Armenian genocide at Musa Dagh, at the time in Aleppo Vilayet, Ottoman Empire and now in Hatay Province, Turkey.

Edward Minasian wrote in "The Forty Years of Musa Dagh" that the movie is "a modest memorial to the heroes of Musa Dagh and to the innocent victims of man’s inhumanity to man."

== Cast ==
- Kabir Bedi as Gabriel Bagradian
  - James Reidel of The New York Review of Books wrote that Bedi's "acting skills could not make up for" deficiencies in the script and the other actors.
- Ronnie Carol as Juliette Bagradian
  - Carol was an Eileen Ford model.
- Paul King as Steven Bagradian
- Guy Stockwell as Simon Tomassian
- Peter Haskell as Maris Durand
- Michael Constantine as Talaat Pasha
- David Mauro as Enver Pasha
- David Opatoshu as Henry Morgenthau, Sr.
- Gilbert Greene as Johannes Lepsius
- John Hoyt as General Waggenheim

== Development and production ==
There were attempts beginning in the 1930s to produce a film adaptation of the novel but the Turkish government used diplomatic and financial pressure to convince MGM to not make the film. Turkish Ambassador to the U.S. Münir Ertegün was afraid that the production of the film would seriously damage Turkey-United States relations.

MGM sold the rights to the film to Kurkjian. Kurkjian, a real estate developer, did not have a lot of experience with filming when he received the rights. Kurkjian initially hoped a studio would make an offer for the filming rights, but chose to begin production himself in 1982 because his rights would contractually expire six weeks later. Kurkjian asked Hakobian to incorporate the best elements of various Musa Dagh scripts into this production. Reidel wrote that the resulting script "bore only a thin resemblance to the novel."

Minasian wrote that the film produced by Kurkjian differed from the envisioned large budget film that MGM had originally planned to make; the actors were "unknown". The budget of the film was $1 million even though the producers hoped for $8–10 million; therefore they removed multiple scenes, and Minasian stated that the final product was "greatly reduced in scope". In addition labor costs used up much of the budget; Reidel described the costs as "union-scale".

Filming locations included Malibu, California, and hill areas around Los Angeles.

== Release, reception and legacy ==
The bulk of screenings were for ethnic Armenian audiences, and commercial theaters did not air it.

David Welky, author of "Global Hollywood Versus National Pride: The Battle to Film The Forty Days of Musa Dagh," wrote that not very many film critics watched the film, and the few that did "savaged" it. Welky stated that Forty Days of Musa Dagh was "a slapped-together farce that lacked cohesiveness" and that it "never had a chance of meeting the grand expectations MGM once had for [the concept]." According to a review by Variety, The Forty Days of Musa Dagh was "a dreary little film that does no justice to its weighty subject." Reidel wrote that "the end result was not a real film, not even a B-picture."

George S. Harris, author of "Cementing Turkish-American Relations: The Ambassadorship of (Mehmet) Münir Ertegün (1934-1944)", stated that the lack of exposure of the film meant that Turkey-United States relations would remain unharmed.
