= Samandağ =

Samandağ السويدية / as-Sūwaydīyah (Levantine Arabic)
- District and municipality
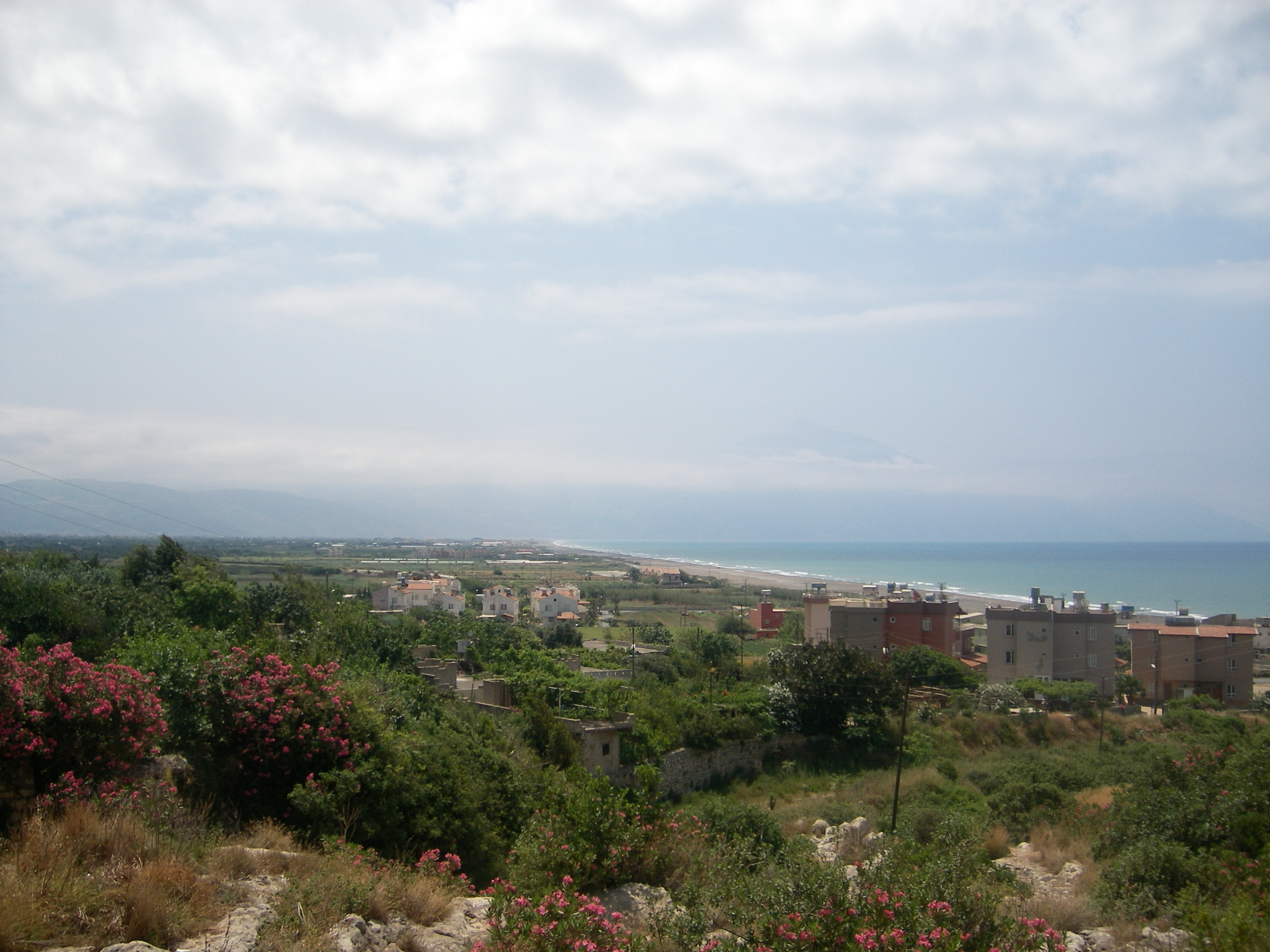

- Logo

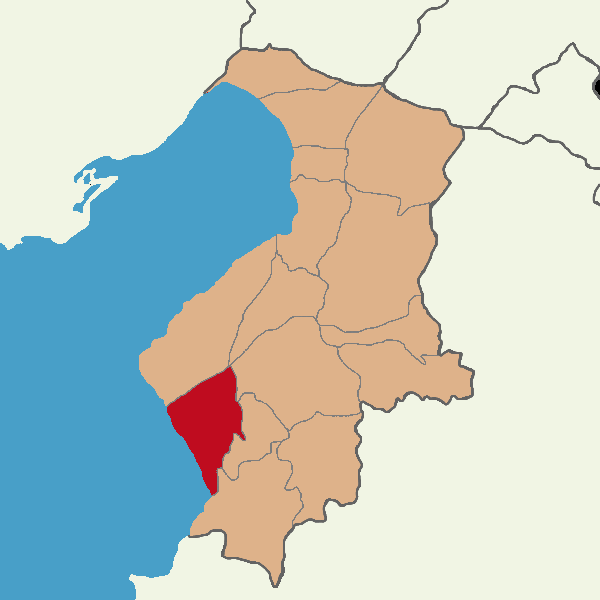
- Map showing Samandağ District in Hatay Province

- Location within Turkey
- Coordinates: 36°05′06″N 35°58′50″E
- Country: Turkey
- Province: Hatay

Government
  - Mayor: Emrah Karaçay (TİP)
- Area: 384 km^{2} (148 sq mi)
- Elevation: 72 m (236 ft)
- Population (2022): 165,494
  - Density: 431/km^{2} (1,120/sq mi)
- Time zone: UTC+3 (TRT)
- Postal code: 31800
- Area code: 0326
- Website: www.samandag.bel.tr

Samandağ, formerly known as Süveydiye (Arabic: السويدية, romanized: al-Sūwaydiyya), is a resort town and municipality and district of Hatay Province, Turkey. Its area is 384 km^{2}, and its population is 123,447 (2022). It lies at the mouth of the Asi River on the Mediterranean coast, near Turkey's border with Syria, 25 km (16 mi) from the city of Antakya. In February 2023, the town was heavily damaged by powerful earthquakes.

== Etymology ==
Samandağ was formerly known as Suweydiye - Arabic for “the black one", in reference to the local roe deer. The Armenian name of the town "Svetia" (Սվեդիա) was derived from the Arabic one.

It was also nicknamed Yukarı Alevışık (Turkish: "Hill of the Alevis/Alawites) and Levşiye (likely the corrupted Arabic form of the ancient name of Seleucia).

It was forcibly renamed Samandağ (Seman-Dağ, Turkish for the Arabic Jabal Sem'an: St. Simeon Mountain) in 1948, part of a systematic campaign to erase local Arab and Armenian heritage through Turkification.

== History ==
Samandağ lies near the site of the ancient Seleucia Pieria, founded in 300 BC after the Persian Empire was ousted from the region by Seleucus Nicator, a general of Alexander the Great, in the Seleucid era that followed Alexander's demise. Seleucia Pieria quickly became a major Mediterranean port of the Hellenistic and Roman eras, the port of Antioch. However, it was subject to silting and an earthquake in 526 finally completed its demise as a port.

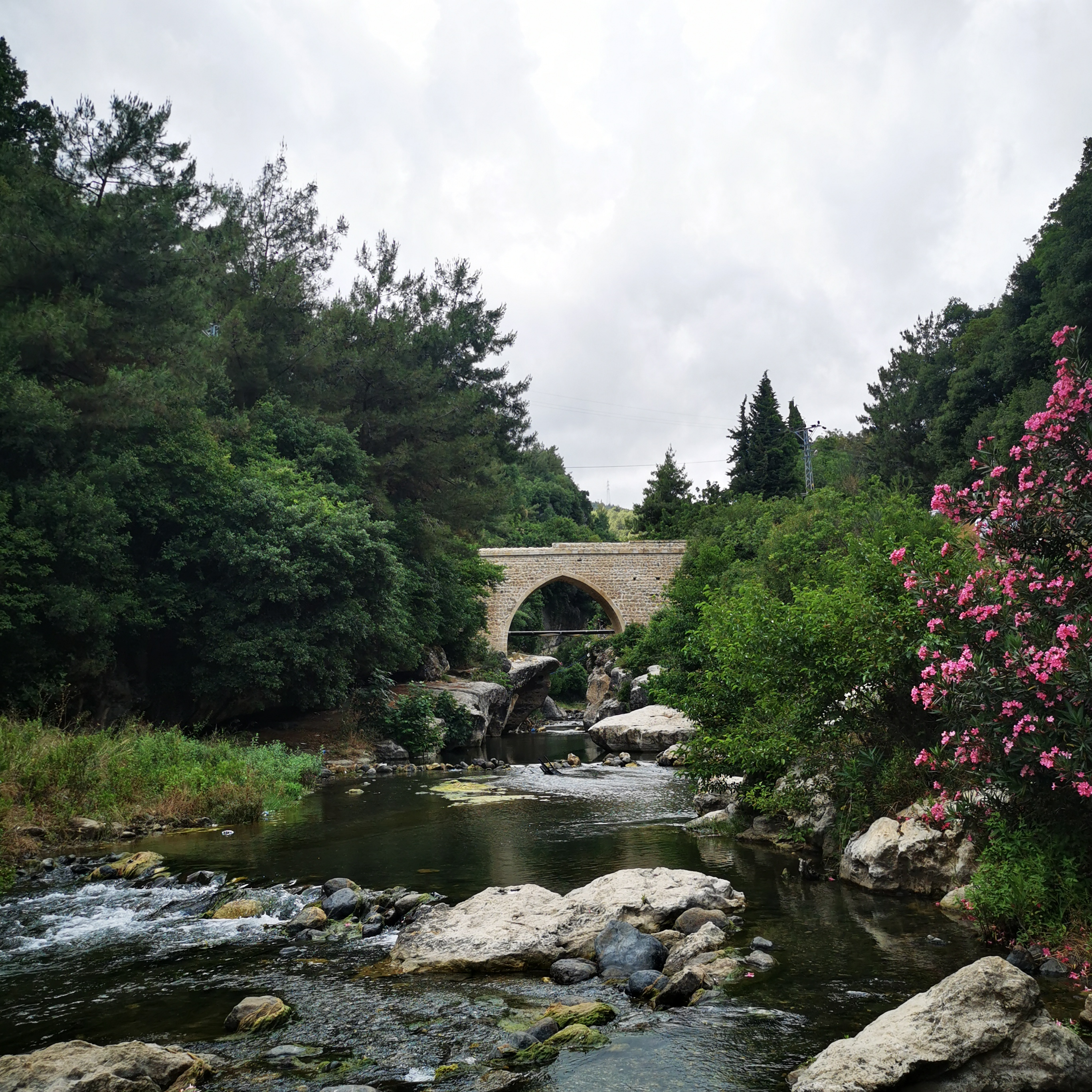
the Batıayaz Bridge in Defne

During the 6th century, Saint Simeon Stylites the Younger lived on Saman Dağı, a nearby mountain that is also known in Christian sources as the "Wondrous Mountain" or the "Admirable Mountain."

Samandağ, then called St Symeon, became the port of Antioch. The area was conquered by the Rashidun Caliphate in 637 after the Battle of the Iron Bridge and later it came under the control of the Umayyad and Abbasid Arab dynasties. It was then reconquered by the Byzantines under Nikephoros II Phokas but later conquered by the Seljuk Turks under general Afşin Bey after the Battle of Manzikert which resulted in a disastrous defeat for the Byzantines. It played an important role in the capture of the city by the Crusaders in 1098, to be known as Soudin. The area was known as Svediye.

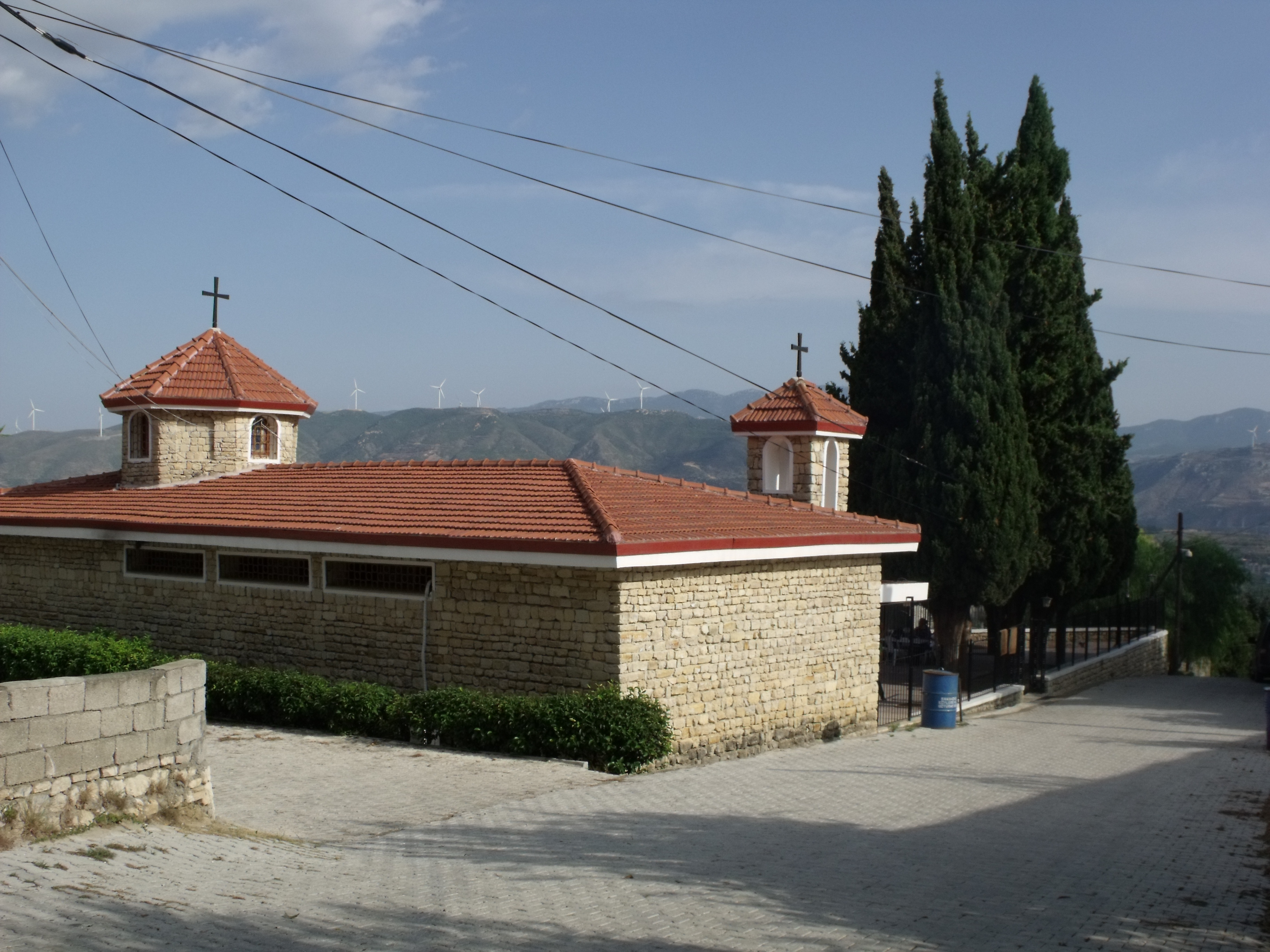
An Armenian church in Vakıflı, Samandağ

There were originally six Armenian villages; Bityas, Kabousiye, Haji Habibly, Kheder Beg, Yoghoun Olouk and Vakif. After the French government agreed to cede Hatay Province to Turkey in 1939, all Armenian villagers (with the exception of some from Vakif) emigrated to Anjar, Lebanon. Vakıflı, the village's modern name, is the only remaining Armenian village in Turkey, with 103 inhabitants (2022).

== Geography ==
Samandağ itself is a small town, about 22 km (14 mi) from the city of Antakya. The local economy depends on fishing and agriculture, especially citrus fruits, and Samandağ has the air of a country market town, with young men buzzing through the streets on mopeds. Around the midtown of Çevlik (derived from Seleucia), there is a long sandy coastline popular with daytrippers from Antakya, although the sea can be stormy. This is an important nesting area of the endangered sea turtle Caretta caretta.

=== Climate ===
Samandağ has a hot-summer Mediterranean climate (Köppen: Csa). Summers are hot and dry, with high humidity and very warm nights. Winters are mild and rainy.

Climate data for Samandağ (1991–2020)
Month	Jan	Feb	Mar	Apr	May	Jun	Jul	Aug	Sep	Oct	Nov	Dec	Year
Mean daily maximum °C (°F)	13.9 (57.0)	15.8 (60.4)	19.0 (66.2)	22.1 (71.8)	25.3 (77.5)	27.9 (82.2)	30.1 (86.2)	31.0 (87.8)	30.1 (86.2)	27.5 (81.5)	21.0 (69.8)	15.3 (59.5)	23.3 (73.9)
Daily mean °C (°F)	10.1 (50.2)	11.5 (52.7)	14.8 (58.6)	17.9 (64.2)	21.5 (70.7)	24.9 (76.8)	27.5 (81.5)	28.4 (83.1)	26.7 (80.1)	22.7 (72.9)	16.3 (61.3)	11.5 (52.7)	19.5 (67.1)
Mean daily minimum °C (°F)	7.0 (44.6)	7.8 (46.0)	10.7 (51.3)	14.0 (57.2)	17.9 (64.2)	22.3 (72.1)	25.5 (77.9)	26.5 (79.7)	23.7 (74.7)	18.4 (65.1)	12.4 (54.3)	8.5 (47.3)	16.3 (61.3)
Average precipitation mm (inches)	141.06 (5.55)	124.18 (4.89)	95.86 (3.77)	61.76 (2.43)	49.4 (1.94)	23.0 (0.91)	6.85 (0.27)	9.37 (0.37)	65.26 (2.57)	80.05 (3.15)	99.13 (3.90)	166.31 (6.55)	922.23 (36.31)
Average precipitation days (≥ 1.0 mm)	10.8	9.8	8.6	6.0	4.0	2.3	1.6	1.6	4.2	5.4	5.7	10.0	70.0
Average relative humidity (%)	70.5	68.8	69.9	72.7	75.4	77.8	78.9	77.7	72.4	65.8	62.1	69.5	71.8
Source: NOAA

== Composition ==
There are 42 neighbourhoods in Samandağ District:

- Ataköy
- Atatürk
- Avcılar
- Batıayaz
- Büyükoba
- Çamlıyayla
- Çanakoluk
- Cemalgürsel
- Ceylandere
- Çiğdede
- Çöğürlü
- Çubuklu
- Cumhuriyet
- Değirmenbaşı
- Deniz
- Eriklikuyu
- Fidanlı
- Gözene
- Hıdırbey
- Huzurlu
- Kapısuyu
- Karaçay
- Koyunoğlu
- Kurtderesi
- Kuşalanı
- Mağaracık
- Meydan
- Mızraklı
- Seldiren
- Şükrü Kanatlı
- Sutaşı
- Tekebaşı
- Tomruksuyu
- Uzunbağ
- Vakıflı
- Yaylıca
- Yeni
- Yeniköy
- Yeşilada
- Yeşilköy
- Yeşilyazı
- Yoğunoluk

== Local politics ==
Politically Samandağ is traditionally left-leaning. In the 2009 local elections, Freedom and Solidarity Party (ÖDP) candidate Mithat Nehir was elected mayor of the ilçe with 34.20% of the votes (the CHP candidate got 31.77%, the AKP one 14.07%) he was then the sole victorious ÖDP candidate in the entire republic. In September 2013, he joined the CHP under which banner he successfully contested the next 2014 local elections. In the local elections in March 2019 Refik Eryılmaz was elected Mayor for the Republican People's Party (CHP). The current District Governor is Murat Kütük.

== Places of interest ==
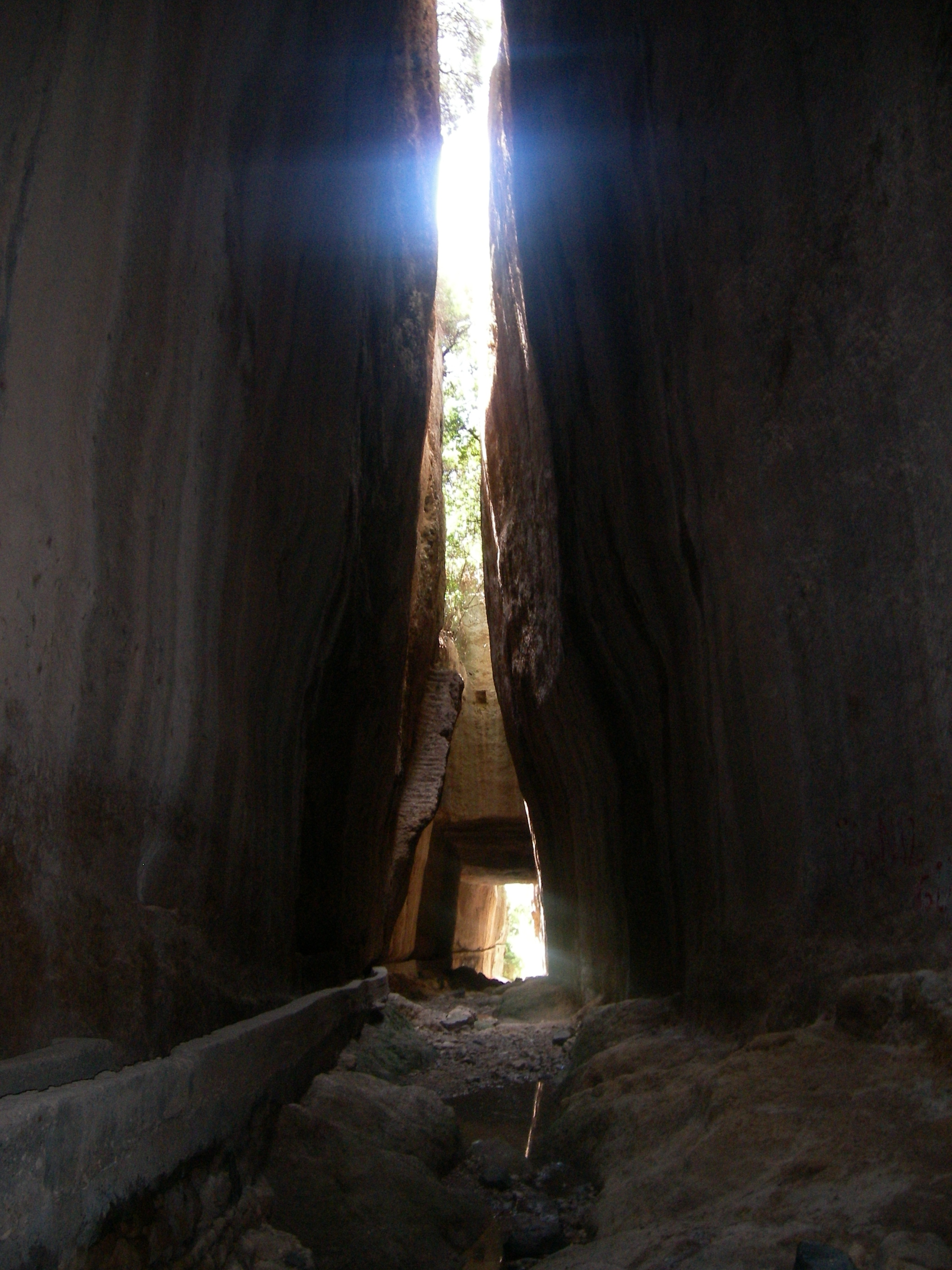
Inside view of the Vespasian Tunnel

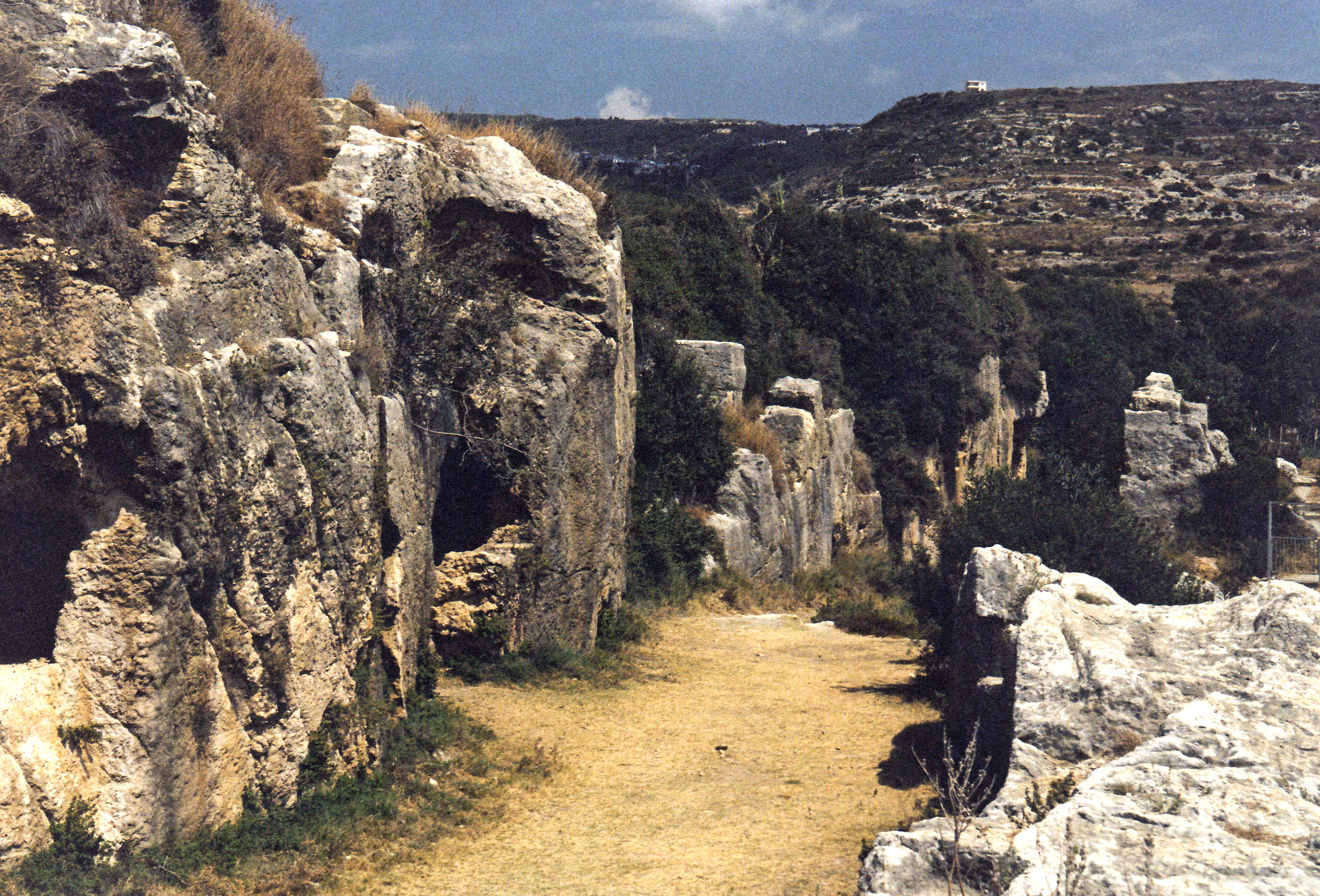
Exit of the Vespasian Tunnel

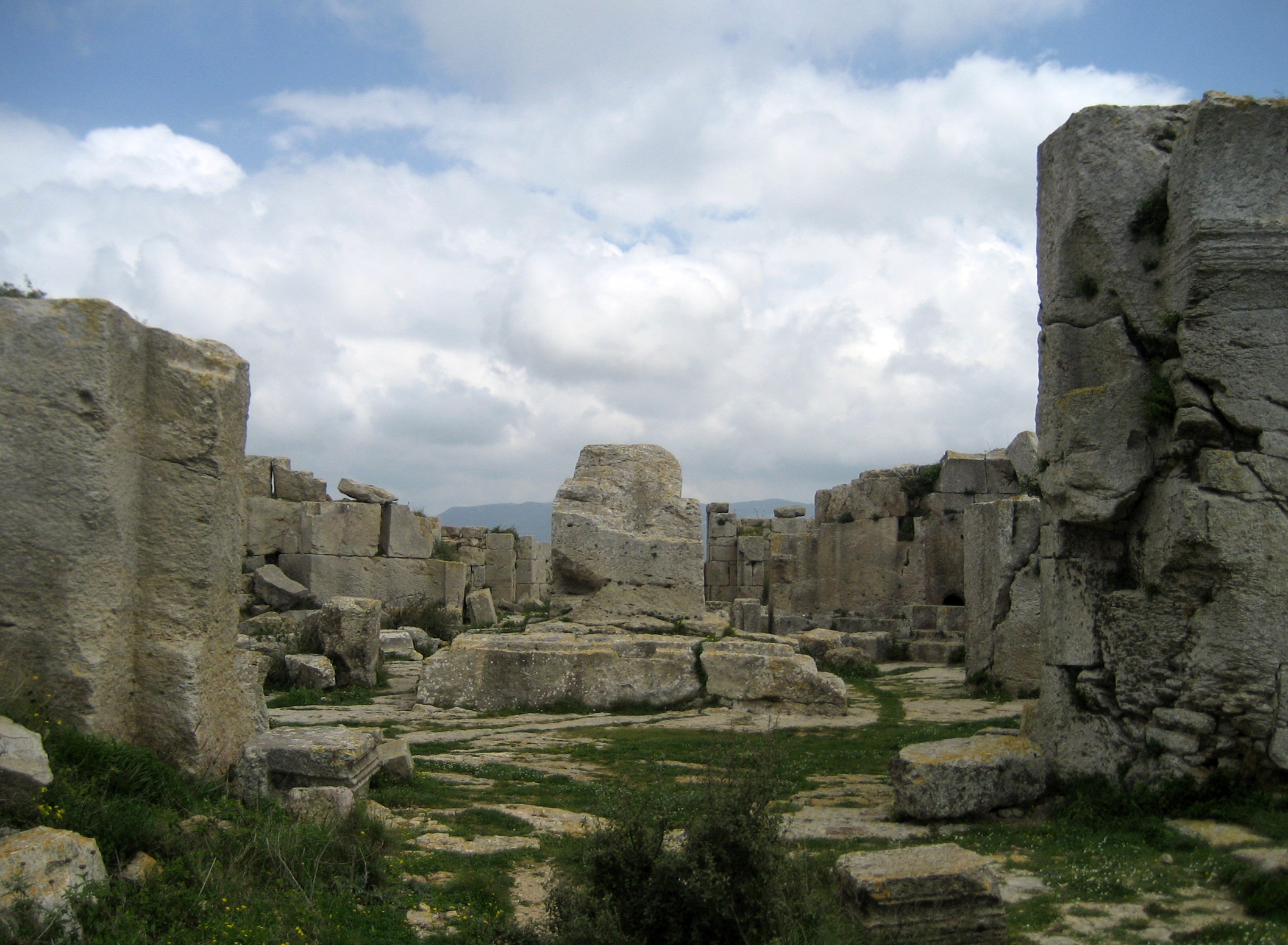
Monastery of St Simeon Stylites the Younger

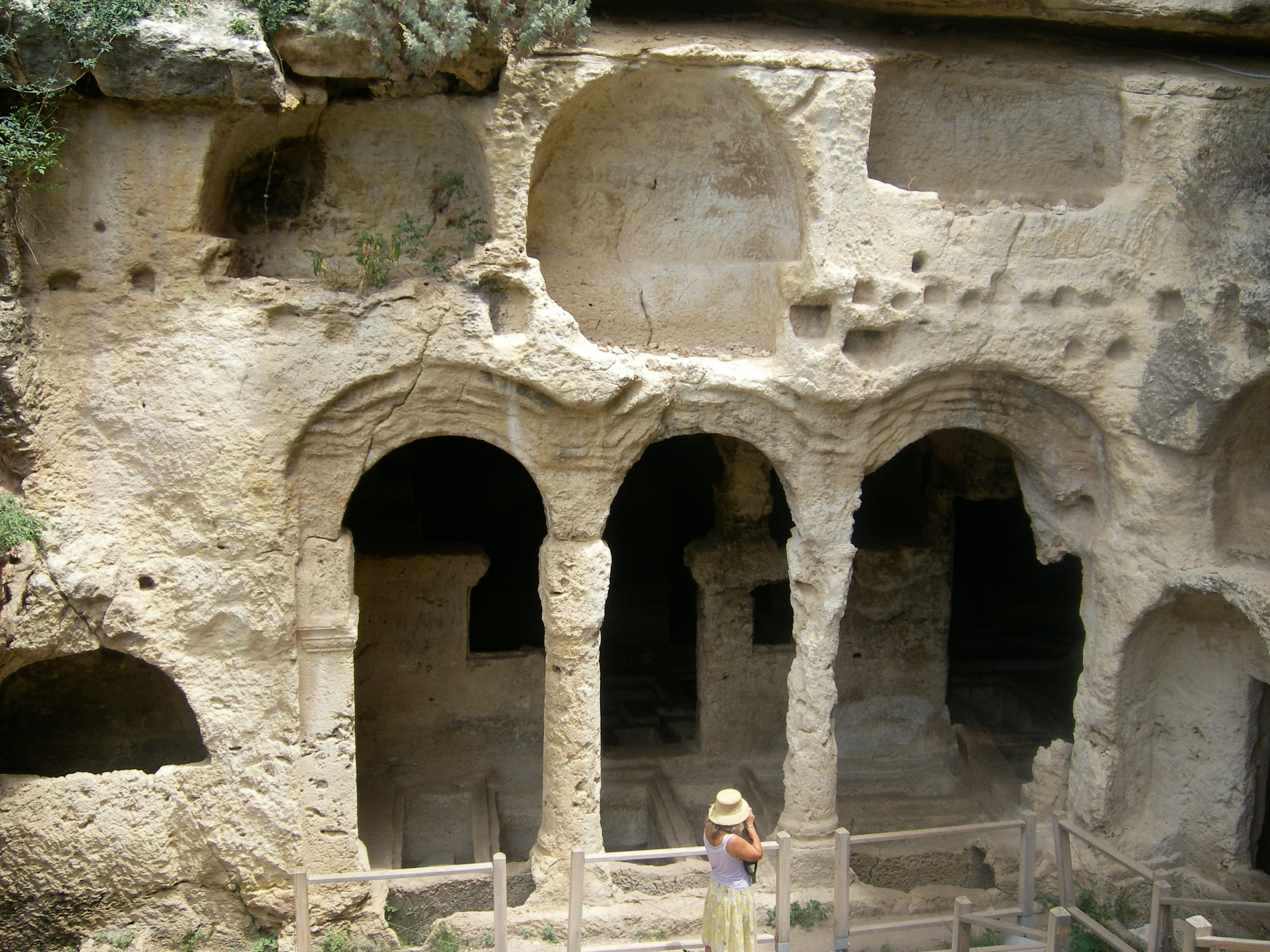
Samandağ Beşikli Cradle Cave

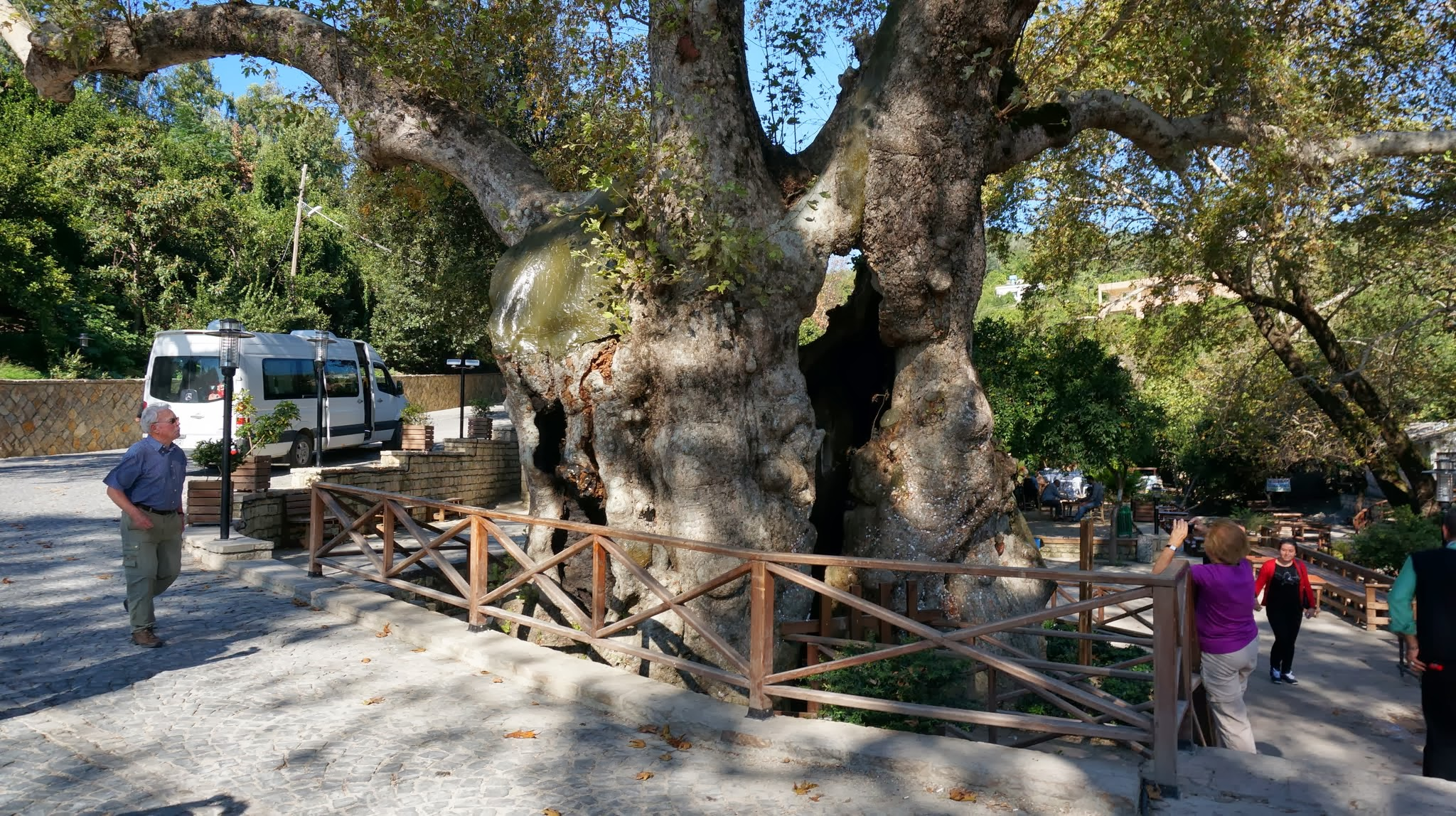
The Hıdırbey Musa Ağacı (Moses Tree)
- The Vespasianus Titus Tunnel, in the village of Kapısuyu , built as a water channel in the 2nd century.
- The Shrine of Khidr.
- Vakıflı, the only remaining Armenian village in Turkey.
- Monastery of Simeon Stylites the Younger

== See also ==
- Latakia
- Seleucia Pieria
