= Alex Hakobian =

American filmmaker and educator

- Born: Germany
- Education: UCLA School of Theater, Film and Television
- Occupations: Teacher, Filmmaker

Alex Hakobian was an American educator and filmmaker. He taught video production in Los Angeles, California. The short films he produced with his students cumulatively won over 300 local, state, national, and international awards over the course of his career, including multiple CINE Golden Eagles and Student Emmys.

== Biography ==
Hakobian was born in Germany and immigrated to the United States to Fresno, California. He attended Roosevelt High School in Fresno where he played for the Roosevelt Rough Riders football team and starred in the school's 1964 theater production of The Curious Savage under the direction of Alice Merrill. He enrolled at Fresno City College, continuing his passion for acting through community theater and college productions.

Hakobian began his career in the television industry at KJEO-TV, an ABC network affiliate, where he appeared in commercials for Anderson Ford, a local car dealership. His film debut came in 1970 with the MGM production Tick…Tick…Tick..., directed by Ralph Nelson. Following his graduation from UCLA School of Theater, Film and Television in 1972, Hakobian began collaborating with producer Ivan Tors. Hakobian continued to contribute to the industry as a gaffer for low-budget films and as a screenwriter for projects such as The Forty Days of Musa Dagh in 1982.

Hakobian began his teaching career in 1986 at Belvedere Middle School in East Los Angeles, where he taught film classes. In 1993, Hakobian joined the Grant High School Communications Technology Magnet in Valley Glen, Los Angeles as a full-time film teacher. During his time at Grant, the school's annual Film Night showcased the best student projects. Hakobian collaborated with the Academy of Television Arts and Sciences to develop a framework for teaching through the arts. Hakobian's dedication earned him a Bravo Award nomination, presented by the Los Angeles Music Center in 2006, for excellence in arts education.

== Video production program ==
The video production program that Hakobian developed at Grant was a rigorous and thoughtfully structured curriculum designed to nurture creativity and technical expertise while instilling a strong ethical foundation in filmmaking. Hakobian emphasized that storytelling was the heart of the process, requiring students to develop narratives with strong, positive themes before delving into the technical aspects of filmmaking. “First comes the story,” he explained, guiding each student to craft their own ideas and refine them collectively in a deliberate, collaborative process.

The program itself was comprehensive, spanning three levels—beginning, intermediate, and advanced—and included five separate classes that allowed students to progress over their four years of high school. Beginning students focused on the technical foundations of filmmaking, including camera work, editing, and other essentials. As they advanced, students moved into story development, scriptwriting, and eventually production processes that mirrored professional filmmaking, albeit on a smaller scale. Hakobian's students were not only taught the mechanics of film production, but also the responsibility of being ethical storytellers, ensuring that their projects aimed to make a difference. This structured yet creative environment gave students a professional framework while fostering a sense of purpose and accountability in their work.

== Teaching philosophy ==
Hakobian emphasized that filmmaking, like all art, should contribute meaningfully to society, even when exploring challenging or dark subjects. Hakobian encouraged students to create films with depth and meaning that could inspire, teach, or provoke thought. Hakobian would not allow his students to create films that glorified negativity, evil, or immorality. His teaching was deeply influenced by his collaboration with Ivan Tors. He often credited Tors’ work, specifically Sea Hunt, alongside his mother's guidance, as formative in shaping his own values.

The value of persistence was among the core ideas Hakobian wished to impart upon his students. "I want to teach completion; that if you don't complete something, you can't have success in anything," he explained. A sign in his classroom read, "If you don't have a goal, you won't reach it." His students’ work earned numerous awards and instilled in them a deep sense of accomplishment. At the 2009 Video in the Classroom Awards, he told students, “Winners finish what they start, and all of you here today have finished what you started. Your hard work and creativity have made you winners.”

Hakobian also believed the arts were as vital to education as core subjects like math and science. He noted that many great scientists cultivated artistic talents, such as playing musical instruments. This holistic view underscored his philosophy that true education goes beyond rote academics to cultivate the emotional depth and critical thinking skills that come from artistic exploration.
