= Kapısuyu =

- Neighbourhood
- Location in Turkey
- Coordinates: 36°08′N 35°56′E
- Country: Turkey
- Province: Hatay
- District: Samandağ
- Elevation: 250 m (820 ft)
- Population (2022): 1,959
- Time zone: UTC+3 (TRT)
- Postal code: 31800
- Area code: 0326

Kapısuyu (Armenian: Քաբուսիե, romanized: Kʻabusie) is a neighbourhood of the municipality and district of Samandağ, Hatay Province, Turkey. Its population is 1,959 (2022). It is near the Mediterranean coastline and in the western slopes of the Nur (Amanus) Mountains. Distance to Samandağ is about 10 kilometres (6.2 mi). The village was an important settlement in the ancient ages. Around 300 BC Seleucia founded the port city of Seleucia Pieria. But the settlement lost its importance after the great earthquake in 528. The village's most important building is its Mosque. The name of the village means "Water gate" or "gate of water".
