= Catholic Patriarchate of Alexandria =

The term Catholic Patriarchate of Alexandria may refer to:

- Latin Patriarchate of Alexandria, a Roman Catholic titular see
- Coptic Catholic Patriarchate of Alexandria, an Eastern Catholic see
- Melkite Greek Catholic Patriarchate of Alexandria, an Eastern Catholic jurisdiction

== See also ==
- Patriarch of Alexandria
- Patriarchate of Alexandria (disambiguation)
- Greek Orthodox Church of Alexandria
- Coptic Orthodox Church
- Latin Patriarch (disambiguation)
- Patriarchate of Antioch (disambiguation)
- Patriarchate of Jerusalem (disambiguation)
- Latin Patriarchate of Constantinople
