= Greek Patriarchate =

Greek Patriarchate may refer to:

- Greek Orthodox Patriarchate of Alexandria, an Eastern Orthodox Patriarchate of Alexandria
- Greek Orthodox Patriarchate of Antioch, an Eastern Orthodox Patriarchate of Antioch
- Greek Orthodox Patriarchate of Constantinople, an Eastern Orthodox Patriarchate of Constantinople
- Greek Orthodox Patriarchate of Jerusalem, an Eastern Orthodox Patriarchate of Jerusalem

== See also ==
- Patriarchate
- Patriarchate of Alexandria (disambiguation)
- Patriarchate of Antioch (disambiguation)
- Patriarchate of Constantinople (disambiguation)
- Patriarchate of Jerusalem (disambiguation)
