= Orthodox Patriarch of Antioch =

Orthodox Patriarch of Antioch may refer to:

- Greek Orthodox Patriarch of Antioch, primate of the Greek Orthodox Patriarchate of Antioch
- Syriac Orthodox Patriarch of Antioch, primate of the Syriac Orthodox Patriarchate of Antioch

== See also ==
- Patriarch of Antioch
- Greek Orthodox Patriarchate of Antioch
- Syriac Orthodox Patriarchate of Antioch
- Catholic Patriarch of Antioch (disambiguation)
- Syriac Patriarch of Antioch (disambiguation)
