= Helenus (disambiguation) =

Helenus, Elenus, or Helenos (Ἕλενος) is a Greek name carried by various people:

- Helenus (mythology), several people in Greek mythology
  - Helenus, a Trojan soldier and prophet mentioned in the Iliad
- Helenus of Alexandria (painter), an ancient Greek painter
- Helenus of Alexandria (Cilicia), a bishop of Alexandria Scabiosa in Cilicia
- Helenus of Heliopolis, a bishop of Heliopolis in Egypt
- Helenus of Tarsus, 3rd century, a bishop of Tarsus in Cilicia
- Helenus Milmo, an Irish lawyer in Britain and High Court judge.
- Helenus of Cyrene, Ptolemaic governor of Cyrene
- Helenus Scott, a Scottish physician
- Helenus (son of Pyrrhus), a prince of Epirus
- HelenOS, an operating system based on a multiserver microkernel design
