= Diocese of Alexandretta =

Catholic titular see

The Diocese of Alexandretta is a titular Christian bishopric centred on the town of Alexandretta in Turkey. It is also known as Alexandrinus or Cambysopolis. The bishopric of Alexandria Minor was a suffragan of Anazarbus, the capital and so also the ecclesiastical metropolis of the Roman province of Cilicia Secunda.

No longer a residential diocese, Alexandria Minor is today listed by the Catholic Church as a titular see.

== List of known bishops ==
- Saint Helenus, 3rd century.
- Aristio, martyr saint
- Theodore, martyr
- Hesychius, who took part in the First Council of Nicaea in 325 and in the Synod of Antioch (341)
- Philomusus participated in the First Council of Constantinople in 381.
- Baranes is mentioned in connection with the Synod of Antioch (445).
- Julianus fl 451
- Basilius was at the Synod of Constantinople (459).
- Paulus, deposed by Justinian fl 518.

== Titular bishops ==
- Łukasz Krzysztof Wielewiejski (11 Sep 1726 – 1743)
- Franz Dominikus von Almesloe (28 Jan 1743 – 1 Mar 1760)
- Józef Michał Ignacy Franciszek Olędzki (24 Jan 1763–1803)
- Thomas Walsh (28 Jan 1825 – 18 Feb 1849)
- Ildefonse-René Dordillon, SS.CC. (7 Dec 1855 – 11 Jan 1888)
- Wilhelmus Antonius Ferdinand Wulfingh, C.SS.R. (30 Jul 1889 – 5 Apr 1906)
- Joseph Butt (16 Jan 1911 – 23 Apr)
- Mathurin-Pie Le Ruyet, O.F.M. Cap. † (16 Jul 1938 Appointed – 9 Jun 1961 Died)
- Daniel Tavares Baeta Neves (1 Jun 1962 – 4 Jun 1964)
- Elias (Youssef) of Aleppo and Alexandretta (1971–2000)
- Paul (Yazigi) of Aleppo and Alexandretta (Greek-Orthodox, 2000- current) Currently taken by ISIS fighters.
