= Łukasz Krzysztof Wielewiejski =

Most Reverend Łukasz Krzysztof Wielewiejski
- Titular Bishop of Cambysopolis (İskenderun)
- Church: Catholic Church
- In office: 1726–1743
- Successor: Franz Dominikus von Almesloe

Orders
- Consecration: 29 September 1726 by Pope Benedict XIII

Personal details
- Born: 16 October 1660 Gradoliz
- Died: 28 January 1743 (age 82)

Łukasz Krzysztof Wielewiejski (16 October 1660 – 28 January 1743) was a Roman Catholic prelate who served as Titular Bishop of Cambysopolis (1726–1743).

== Biography ==
Łukasz Krzysztof Wielewiejski was born in Gradoliz on 16 October 1660. On 11 September 1726, he was appointed during the papacy of Pope Benedict XIII as Titular Bishop of Cambysopolis. On 29 September 1726, he was consecrated bishop by Pope Benedict XIII with Francesco Antonio Finy, Titular Archbishop of Damascus, and Nicolas-Xavier Santamarie, Titular Bishop of Cyrene, serving as co-consecrators. He served as Titular Bishop of Cambysopolis until his death on 28 January 1743.

While bishop, he was the principal co-consecrator of Baltazar Wilksycki, Titular Bishop of Eucarpia and Auxiliary Bishop of Poznań (1728).

== See also ==
- Diocese of Alexandretta

Catholic Church titles
Preceded by	Titular Bishop of Cambysopolis; 1726–1743	Succeeded by Franz Dominikus von Almesloe
