= Paulus (bishop of Alexandretta) =

Paulus (Bishop of Alexandretta, fl. 518) was a 6th-century Bishop of Alexandria Minor or Alexandretta in modern Turkey.

Paulus was a Monophysite, so a christologic heretic from the Catholic and orthodox point of view. Paulus, was deposed by the Byzantine Emperor Justinian around 518AD. along with many other bishops of the area.
