= Syriac Patriarch of Antioch =

Syriac Patriarch of Antioch may refer to:

- The head of Syriac Orthodox Church
  - For individual patriarchs, see: List of Syriac Orthodox Patriarchs of Antioch
- The head of Syriac Catholic Church
  - For individual patriarchs, see: Syriac Catholic Patriarchs of Antioch

== See also ==
- Patriarch of Antioch
- Patriarchate of Antioch (disambiguation)
- List of Greek Orthodox Patriarchs of Antioch
- Catholic Patriarch of Antioch (disambiguation)
