= Catholic Patriarch of Antioch =

Catholic Patriarch or Patriarchate of Antioch may refer to:

- Latin Patriarchate of Antioch, a Roman Catholic titular see
- Maronite Catholic Patriarchate of Antioch
  - For its Patriarchs, see List of Maronite Patriarchs of Antioch
- Melkite Catholic Patriarchate of Antioch
  - For its Patriarchs, see List of Melkite Catholic Patriarchs of Antioch
- Syriac Catholic Patriarchate of Antioch, a.k.a. the Syriac Catholic Church
  - For its Patriarchs, see Syriac Catholic Patriarchs of Antioch

== See also ==
- Patriarch of Antioch
- Patriarchate of Antioch (disambiguation)
  - Greek Orthodox Church of Antioch, List of Greek Orthodox Patriarchs of Antioch
  - Syriac Orthodox Church, List of Syriac Orthodox Patriarchs of Antioch
- Latin Patriarch (disambiguation)
- Patriarchate of Jerusalem (disambiguation)
- Latin Patriarchate of Constantinople
