= Cathedral of the Annunciation, İskenderun =

Coordinates: 36°35′28″N 36°10′05″E

Cathedral of the Annunciation
- İskenderun Katolik Kilisesi
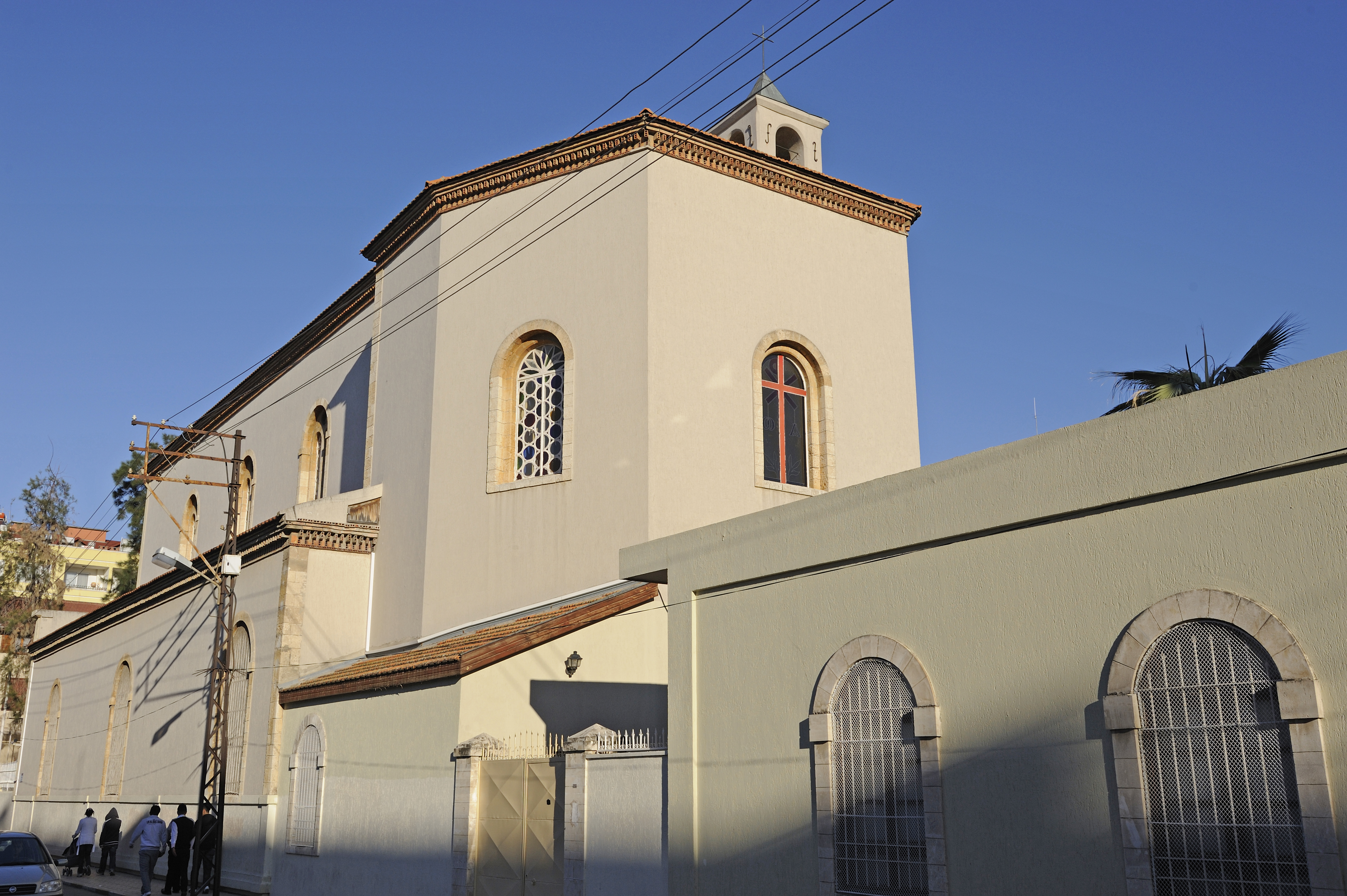
- Cathedral of the Annunciation
- Location: İskenderun
- Country: Turkey
- Denomination: Catholic

History
- Dedication: 1871

Architecture
- Years built: 1858-1871

The Cathedral of the Annunciation, also known as the Alexandrian Catholic Church (in Turkish: İskenderun Katolik Kilisesi) is a religious building belonging to the Catholic Church and functioning as the cathedral of the Apostolic Vicariate of Anatolia in İskenderun in the Eurasian country of Turkey. It is located in Yenişehir Mah. Mithat.

It was built between 1858 and 1871 by the Order of the Carmelites. After a fire in 1887 it was rebuilt between the years 1888–1901. Currently the ministry in the cathedral is in charge of the Order of Conventual Franciscans (since 2003).

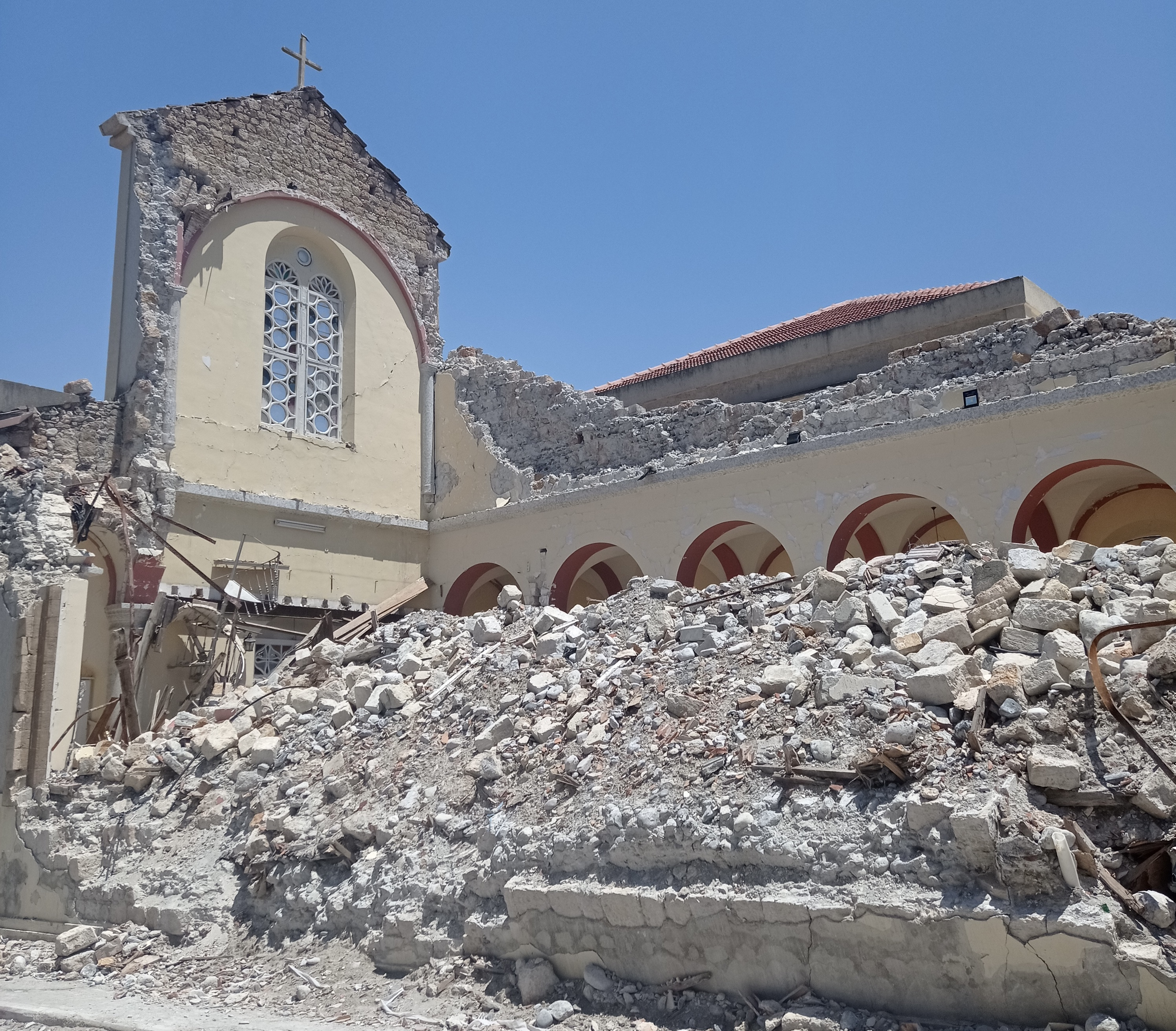
Church after earthquake.

The cathedral was badly damaged when its roof and part of its walls collapsed in the 2023 Turkey–Syria earthquake.

== See also ==
- Levantines (Latin Christians)
