= Firmilian =

3rd AD century Bishop of Caesarea Mazaca

Saint Firmilian

Bishop of Caesarea Mazaca
- Died: ca. 269 AD; Tarsus (modern-day Tarsus, Mersin, Turkey)
- Venerated in: Eastern Orthodox Church
- Feast: 28 October

Firmilian (Greek: Φιρμιλιανός, Latin: Firmilianus, died c. 269 AD), Bishop of Caesarea Mazaca from c. 232, was a disciple of Origen. He had a contemporary reputation comparable to that of Dionysius of Alexandria or Cyprian, bishop of Carthage. He took an active part in the mid-3rd century controversies over rebaptising heretics and readmitting lapsed Christians after the persecutions of Decius and was excommunicated by Pope Stephen I for his position. A single letter of Firmilian to Cyprian survives among Cyprian's correspondence. Jerome omits Firmilian from De viris illustribus. "To his contemporaries his forty years of influential episcopate, his friendship with Origen and Dionysius, the appeal to him of Cyprian, and his censure of Stephanus might well make him seem the most conspicuous figure of his time" (Wace).

== Life ==
Gregory of Nyssa tells that Gregory Thaumaturgus, when still a pagan, having completed his secular studies, "fell in with Firmilian, a Cappadocian of noble family, similar to himself in character and talent, as he showed in his subsequent life when he adorned the Church of Caesarea." The two young men came to Alexandria to study with Origen by whom Gregory, at least, was baptised. Firmilian was more probably brought up as a Christian.

Later, when bishop of Cæsarea in Cappadocia, according to Eusebius, Firmilian invited Origen to his own country for the benefit of the Churches, around (232-5) when Origen was staying in Cæsarea of Palestine, on account of his bishop's displeasure at his having been ordained priest in that city.

Firmilian was an opponent of the stringent policies of antipope Novatian, for Dionysius writes that he had been invited to a synod at Antioch in 252 by the bishops of Cilicia, Cappadocia, and Palestine to repudiate Novatianism.

Dionysius counts Firmilian as one of "the more eminent bishops" in a letter to Pope Stephen I (Eusebius, VII, v, 1), where his expression "Firmilian and all Cappadocia" implies that Caesarea was already a metropolitan see. This explains how Firmilian could invite Origen to Cappadocia, "for the benefit of the Churches".

== Firmilian's letter to Cyprian ==
A controversy arose as to whether it was necessary or not to re-baptize those Christians who had been initially baptized by heretics. Tertullian held that it was necessary since such a baptism was null.

It was the practice in the East to rebaptize those baptized by heretics. When the baptismal controversy arose, Cyprian wished to gain support from the Eastern churches against Pope Stephen for his own decision to rebaptize all heretics who returned to the Church. At the end of the summer of 256, he sent the deacon Rogatian to Firmilian with a letter, together with the documents on the subject—letters of the pope, of his own, and of his council at Carthage in the spring, and the treatise De Ecclesia Catholica Unitate.

In a letter to Pope Sixtus II (257–58), Dionysius mentions that in the controversy over rebaptism of the lapsed, Pope Stephen had refused communication with Helenus of Tarsus, Firmilian, and all Cilicia and Cappadocia, and the neighbouring lands (Eusebius, VII, v, 3–4), a subject touched on in the sole surviving letter of Firmilian, a response to Cyprian.

=== On baptism ===
Firmilian's reply was received at Carthage about the middle of November. It is a long letter, even more bitter and violent than the letter of Cyprian to Pompeius. It has come down to us in a translation made, no doubt, under Cyprian's direction, and apparently very literal, as it abounds in Greek expressions.

In the letter, Cyprian's arguments against Pope Stephen are reiterated and reinforced. Firmilian says: "We have received your writings as our own, and have committed them to memory by repeated reading" (c. iv). Firmilian's reasoning against the validity of heretical baptism is mainly that of Cyprian, that those who are outside the Church and have not the Holy Spirit cannot admit others to the Church or give what they do not possess: "Very many of us meeting together in Iconium very carefully examined the matter, and we decided that every baptism was altogether to be rejected which is arranged for without the Church."

=== Regarding Pope Stephen ===
The argument of Firmilian's letter is written with a bit more vehemence and acerbity than becomes a bishop, chiefly for the reason, as may be suspected, that Stephen had also written to Firmilianus, Helenus, and other bishops of those parts.

The dispute was similar to that which developed over Novatianism, that is, under what circumstances are those who left the faith to be re-admitted to communion. According to Alban Butler, the practice of the Church was to regard any baptism given in the evangelical words, that is, in the name of the three persons of the Holy Trinity, as valid and not dependent upon the moral character of the person administering it. While both faith and the state of grace are required in him who confers any sacrament, any culpable failure in this regard belongs to the minister not the recipient, and does not affect the sacrament's validity.

This was the practice even of the African Church till Agrippinus, bishop of Carthage, in the close of the second century, changed it, fifty years before St. Cyprian. Thus, Stephen based his argument on to tradition from St. Peter and St. Paul. Firmilian reassures Cyprian that although at Carthage the custom of rebaptizing may be new, in Cappadocia it has been the custom from the very beginning, and he can answer Stephen by opposing tradition to tradition, and that some time since, he had joined in a council at Iconium with the bishops of Galatia and Cilicia and other provinces, and had decided to rebaptize the Montanists.

The disagreement with Stephen was further complicated in that Stephen viewed it as touching on matters of faith, while Cyprian and Firmilian considered it a question of discipline appropriate to the jurisdiction of individual ordinaries. Stephen threatened to cut off the patrons of the novelty from the communion of the Church. But St. Dionysius of Alexandria interceded by letters, and procured a respite.

Firmilian enables us to gather much of the drift of Stephen's letter to Cyprian. The threat of excommunication only served to incense Firmilian who considered it "ridiculous" that Stephen demanded nothing but the use of the Trinitarian formula. He viewed Stephen's perceived leniency towards heretics as an insult to the Apostles.

Moreover, he disagreed that Rome preserved the Apostolic traditions unchanged, for it differed from Jerusalem as to the observances at Easter and he disputed Stephen's authority to excommunicate them. "I am justly indignant with Stephen's obvious and manifest silliness, that he so boasts of his position, and claims that he is the successor of St. Peter on whom were laid the foundations of the Church... You have cut yourself off—do not mistake—since he is the true schismatic who makes himself an apostate from the communion of ecclesiastical unity. For in thinking that all can be excommunicated by you, you have cut off yourself alone from the communion of all."

Dionysius, in a letter to the Roman priest Philemon, also mentions the Council of Iconium. It was presumably held in the last years of Alexander Severus, ca 231–35.

== Proceedings against Paul of Samosata ==
Firmilian presided at a council at Antioch which discussed deposing Paul of Samosata, in 266. He was persuaded that Paul would amend, however another council was necessary. He was on his way to this assembly when death overtook him, at Tarsus, in c. 269.

Though Firmilian was excommunicated by Stephen, it is certain that the following popes did not adhere to this severe policy. Firmilian is commemorated in the Greek martyrology (October 28) but is not venerated in the West. His great successor in Cappadocia, St Basil of Caesarea, mentions his view on heretical baptism without accepting it (Epistle clxxxviii), and says, when speaking of the expression "with the Holy Ghost" in the Doxology: "That our own Firmilian held this faith is testified by the lógoi which he has left" (De Spiritu Sancto, xxix, 74). There is no other mention of such writings, which were probably letters.

== See also ==
- Council of Iconium
