= Helenus of Alexandria (Cilicia) =

Helenus of Alexandria Scabiosa in Cilicia was bishop of Alexandria Scabiosa (modern İskenderun, Turkey) in the 2nd or 3rd century.

According to Le Quien, he baptized the martyr Eugenia of Rome under the reign of Commodus. He was canonized as a saint. But other sources claim it was Helenus of Heliopolis or Helenus of Tarsus.
