= Patriarchate of Alexandria (disambiguation) =

The Patriarchate of Alexandria is the office and jurisdiction of the bishop of Alexandria in Egypt, referred to since 531 as Patriarch of Alexandria. It originated from Mark the Evangelist and developed until the Council of Chalcedon in 451 when it split into parallel Chalcedonian and Miaphysite traditions, which then competed for the position for several decades before permanently parting ways in 536:

- List of patriarchs of Alexandria until 536
- Coptic Orthodox Church, or the Non-Chalcedonian Monophysite Coptic Orthodox Patriarchate of Alexandria
  - Pope of the Coptic Orthodox Church
  - List of Coptic Orthodox popes
- Greek Orthodox Patriarchate of Alexandria of the Chalcedonian Eastern Orthodox Church
  - List of Greek Orthodox patriarchs of Alexandria
- Coptic Catholic Patriarchate of Alexandria of the Coptic Catholic Church
- Melkite Catholic Patriarchate of Alexandria of the Melkite Greek Catholic Church

Patriarchate, Patriarch, Diocese, Archdiocese, Bishop or Archbishop of Alexandria may also refer to the following in relation to Alexandria in Egypt:

- Latin Patriarchate of Alexandria, titular see of the Catholic Church from the 13th century to 1964
- Episcopal/Anglican Province of Alexandria, est. 1920 as the Diocese of Egypt and the Sudan of the Anglican Communion

and in relation to other places named Alexandria:

- Diocese of Alexandria and Teleorman of the Romanian Orthodox Church
- Roman Catholic Diocese of Alexandria–Cornwall, Canada
- Roman Catholic Diocese of Alexandria in Louisiana, United States

== See also ==
- Diocese of Alexandretta
- Pentarchy
- Patriarchate of Antioch (disambiguation)
- Patriarchate of Constantinople (disambiguation)
- Patriarchate of Jerusalem (disambiguation)
- History of early Christianity
