= Patriarchate of Constantinople (disambiguation) =

Patriarchate of Constantinople generally refers to the Ecumenical Patriarchate of Constantinople, the seniormost authority in the Eastern Orthodox Church, led by the Ecumenical Patriarch of Constantinople. The diocese of Constantinople is alleged to have originated with Andrew the Apostle's visit in 38, and has been formally designated as Patriarchate since 531. Its seat is the city successively known as Byzantium, Constantinople, and now Istanbul, Turkey.

- List of ecumenical patriarchs of Constantinople

Bishop, Diocese, Archbishop, Archdiocese, Exarch, Exarchate, Patriarch, or Patriarchate of Constantinople may also refer to:

- Latin Patriarchate of Constantinople, est. 1204 in Constantinople, then titular from 1261 until suppression in 1964
- Armenian Patriarchate of Constantinople, autonomous see est. 1461 following Ottoman conquest of Constantinople
  - Armenian Patriarch of Constantinople
  - List of Armenian patriarchs of Constantinople
- Armenian Catholic Archeparchy of Istanbul, est. 1860 by the Armenian Catholic Church
- Greek Catholic Apostolic Exarchate of Istanbul, est. 1911 by the sui juris Greek Byzantine Catholic Church
- Autocephalous Turkish Orthodox Patriarchate, est. 1922 in Kayseri and relocated in 1924 to Istanbul
- Melkite Greek Catholic Patriarchal Exarchate of Istanbul, est. 1946 by the Damascus-based Melkite Greek Catholic Church

== See also ==
- Pentarchy
- Patriarchate of Alexandria (disambiguation)
- Patriarchate of Antioch (disambiguation)
- Patriarchate of Jerusalem (disambiguation)
- History of Early Christianity
