= Helenus of Tarsus =

3rd-century bishop of Tarsus

Helenus of Tarsus was a bishop of Tarsus and a metropolitan in the 3rd century.

He is known for being involved in the controversy surrounding rebaptism – according to Dionysius the Great of Alexandria, Helenus became involved in the dispute between Cyprian and Pope Stephen I in 256, siding with Cyprian. Stephen renounced communion with Helenus and others for insisting on rebaptising those previously baptised by heretics. Dionysius placed Helenus among the "most distinguished bishops of the East".

Helenus also attended synods held at Antioch in c. 253, 265 and 272, presiding over the last following the death of Firmilian. The synod of c. 253 was against the Novatian heresy. The third synod of 272 is referred to as the Synodus Heleni (Synod of Helenus) in the Synodicon Vetus.

Helenus died sometime after 268.
