= Latin Patriarch =

Latin Patriarch may refer to these Catholic sees and/or titles :

Catholic counter-claimants to the titles of the Pentarchy

- Latin Patriarch of Constantinople (suppressed)
- Latin Patriarch of Antioch (suppressed)
- Latin Patriarch of Alexandria (suppressed)
- Latin Patriarch of Jerusalem
- Latin Patriarch of Ethiopia (suppressed)

Other Patriarch(ate)s of the Latin Church

- Patriarch of Venice
- Patriarch of Lisbon
- Patriarch of the East Indies (vested in Goa)
- Patriarch of Aquileia (extinct)
- Patriarch of Grado (merged with the office of the Bishop of Castello to become the Patriarch of Venice)
- Patriarch of the West Indies (extinct)

Patriarch of Rome and all the West and Patriarch of the West are two rarely mentioned titles of the Pope. Catholicism also recognizes the patriarchs of the East, but they would never be called "Latin."
