= İskenderun =

City in Hatay, Turkey

İskenderun Alexandretta
- District and municipality
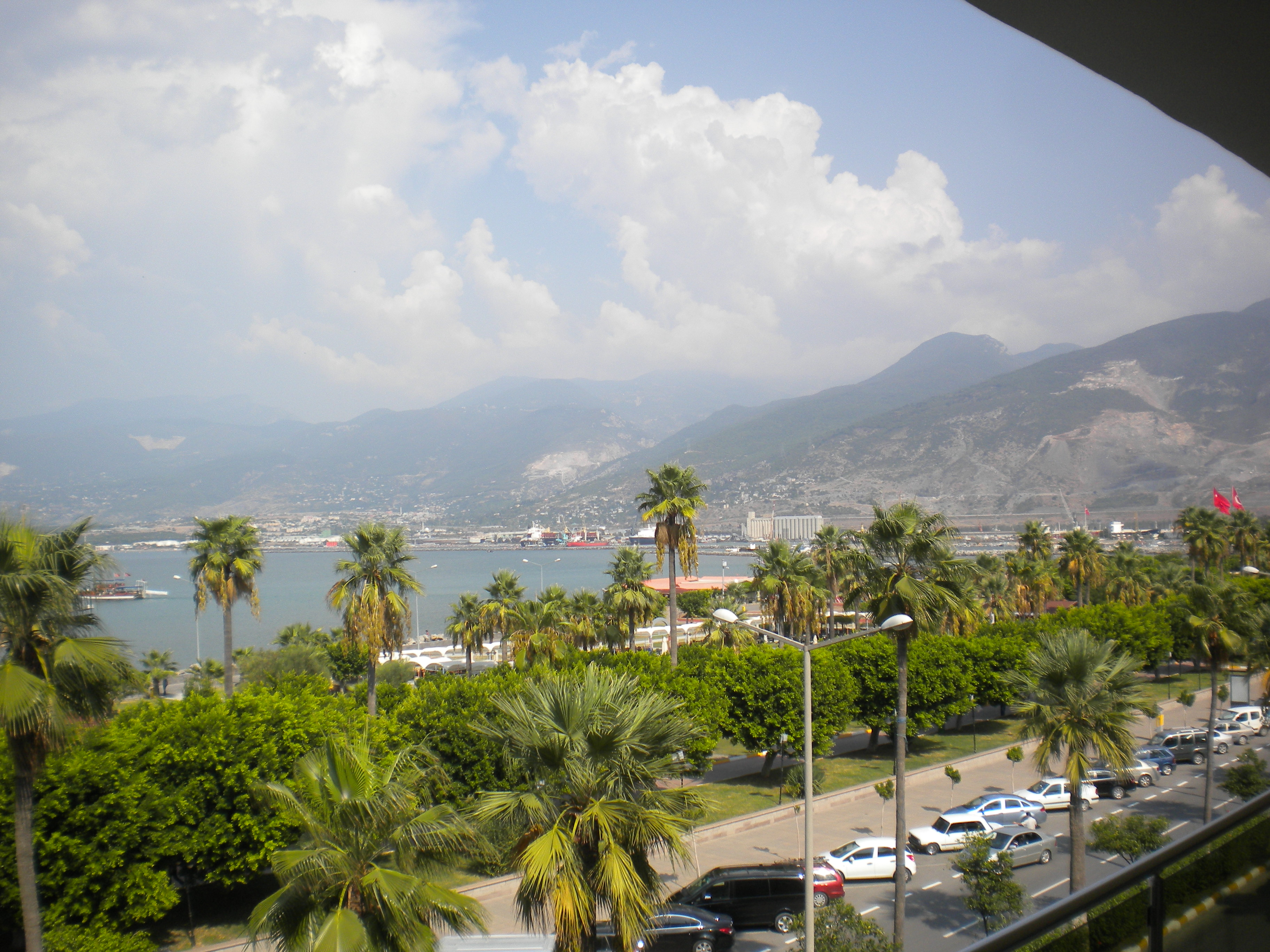

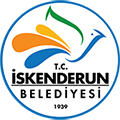
- Logo

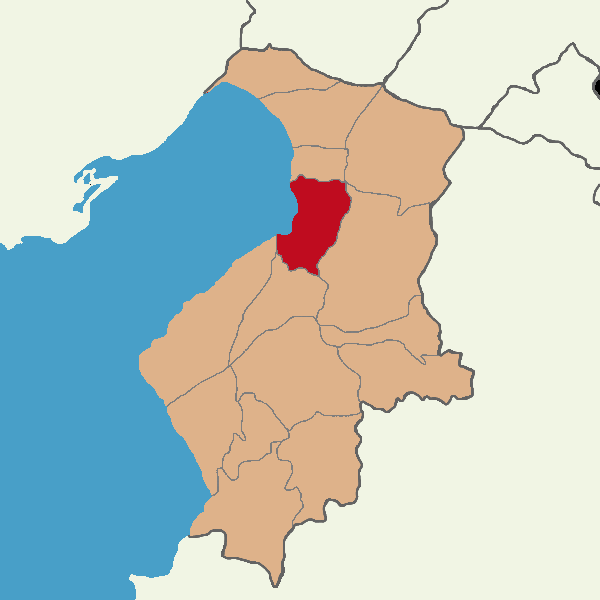
- Map showing İskenderun District in Hatay Province

- Location within Turkey
- Coordinates: 36°34′54″N 36°09′54″E
- Country: Turkey
- Province: Hatay

Government
  - Mayor: Mehmet Dönmez (AKP)
- Area: 247 km^{2} (95 sq mi)
- Population (2022): 251,682
  - Density: 1,020/km^{2} (2,640/sq mi)
- Time zone: UTC+3 (TRT)
- Area code: 0326
- Website: www.iskenderun.bel.tr

İskenderun (Arabic: إسكندرونة), historically known as Alexandretta (Greek: Αλεξανδρέττα, lit. 'little Alexandria') and Scanderoon, is a municipality and district of Hatay Province, Turkey. Its area is 247 km^{2}, and its population is 251,682 (2022). It is on the Mediterranean coast. Located on an alluvial plain, the city was heavily damaged by powerful earthquakes in February 2023 and subsequent aftershocks, floods and fires.

The city's history dates back to the Hellenistic period. Legend says it was founded by Alexander the Great in 333 BC, but it was more likely founded by one of his successors. It subsequently fell under Seleucid rule before being conquered by the Romans. After defeating the Byzantines in the 8th century, the Abbasid Caliphate gained control of the city. During the First Crusade, it came under the control of the Principality of Antioch before being captured by the Mamluk Sultanate.

By the 15th century, the Ottomans had conquered the city, maintaining control over it until the partition of the Ottoman Empire after the Allied victory in World War I. It subsequently became a sanjak in the French mandate of Syria until 1938, when France granted the region independence. The city became part of the Hatay State which in turn united with Turkey in 1939.

== Name ==
The city was founded as Alexandria (Ἀλεξάνδρεια) to commemorate Alexander the Great's victory over the Persian Darius III at Issus (Cilicia) in (333 BC). Starting in the Middle Ages, Western pilgrims used the diminutive Romance form Alexandretta.

== History ==
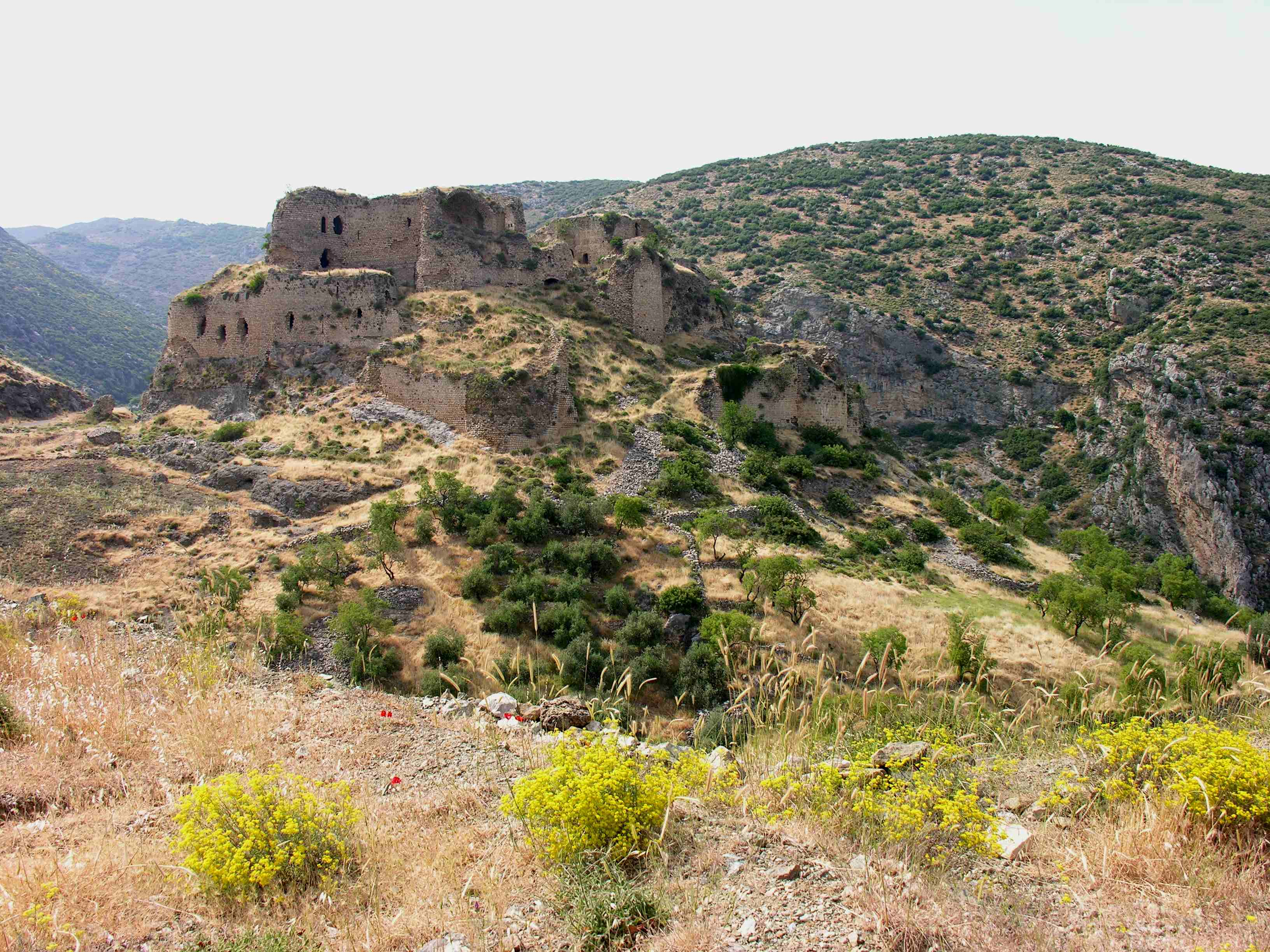
Ruins of Bagras Castle on the Nur (Amanos) Mountains near İskenderun

=== Antiquity ===
İskenderun preserves the name, but probably not the exact site, of Alexandria ad Issum. According to legend, the settlement was founded by Alexander the Great in 333 BC to supersede Myriandus as the key to the Syrian Gates, about 37 km (23 miles) south of the scene of his victory at the Battle of Issus against the Persian King Darius III. Alexander camped in the highlands of İskenderun, around Esentepe, and then ordered the city to be established and named Alexandria. However, this story is only recorded by unreliable sources such as Pseudo-Scymnus; considering the documentary emphasis on Alexandria in Egypt as his first foundation, it is considered very unlikely that Alexander founded Alexandria ad Issum, although it almost certainly existed.

The importance of the place comes from its relation to the aforesaid Syrian Gates, the easiest approach to the open ground of Hatay Province and Aleppo. Because of its hilly, rough surroundings, the city also went by the name of Alexandria Scabiosa ('Alexandria the Mountainous').

=== Ecclesiastical history ===
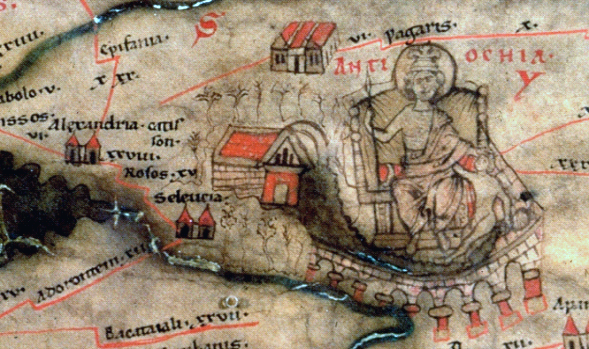
The Peutinger Map showing İskenderun and Seleucia in the 4th century.

The bishopric of Alexandria Minor was a suffragan of Anazarbus, the capital and so also the ecclesiastical metropolis of the Roman province of Cilicia Secunda. Greek menologia speak of Saint Helenus, and the martyr saints Aristio and Theodore as early bishops of the See. But the first documented one is Hesychius, who took part in the First Council of Nicaea in 325 and in a synod at Antioch in 341. Philomusus participated in the First Council of Constantinople in 381. Baranes is mentioned in connection with a synod at Antioch in 445. At the Council of Chalcedon in 451, Julianus was represented by his metropolitan, Cyrus of Anazarbus. Basilius was at the synod in Constantinople in 459 that condemned simoniacs. In 518, Paulus was deposed by the Byzantine Emperor Justinian for supporting the Jacobite Severus of Antioch.

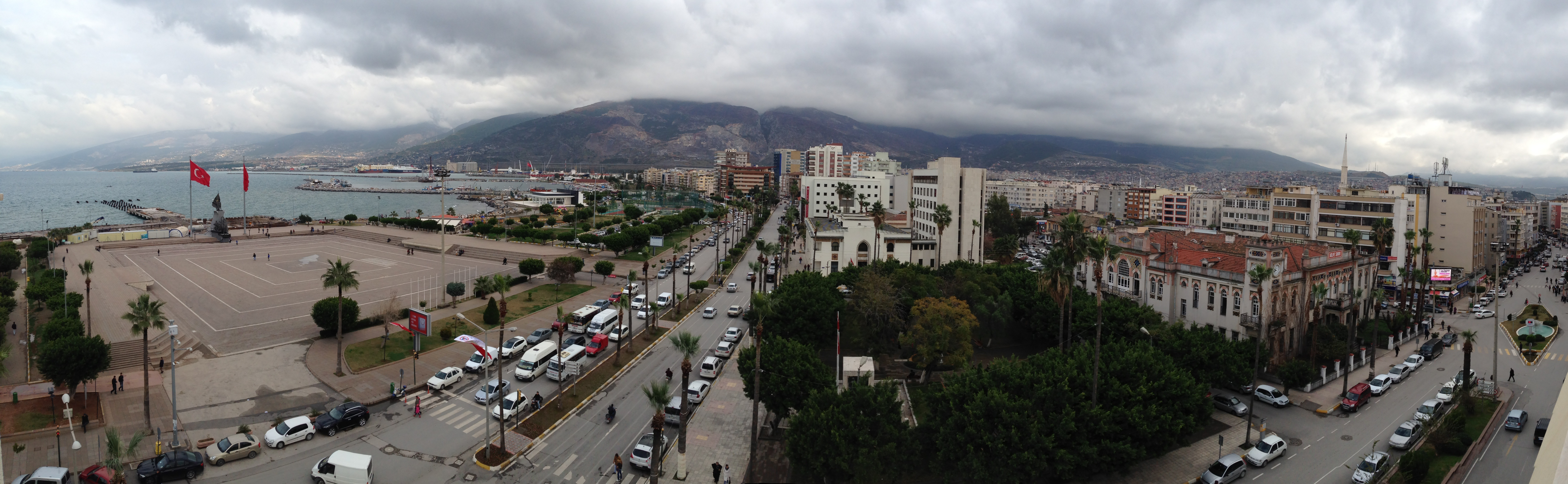
The district center and Gulf of İskenderun

No longer a residential diocese, Alexandria Minor is today listed by the Catholic Church as a titular see. In that list it was long named Cambysopolis, but the Annuario Pontificio now gives the correct ancient name.

=== Ottoman era ===
There was fighting here under the Ottoman Empire: in 1606 the army of General Kuyucu Murat Pasha suppressed the Jelali revolts. The Ottomans continued to fortify the city, and the remains of the early 17th-century Ottoman castle walls can still be seen where the Güzün stream crosses the Varyant road. The city was well described in 1675 by the English naval chaplain Henry Teonge in his diary. The next army to cross the Belen Pass and attack Anatolia through here were the Egyptians of Muhammad Ali in 1832.

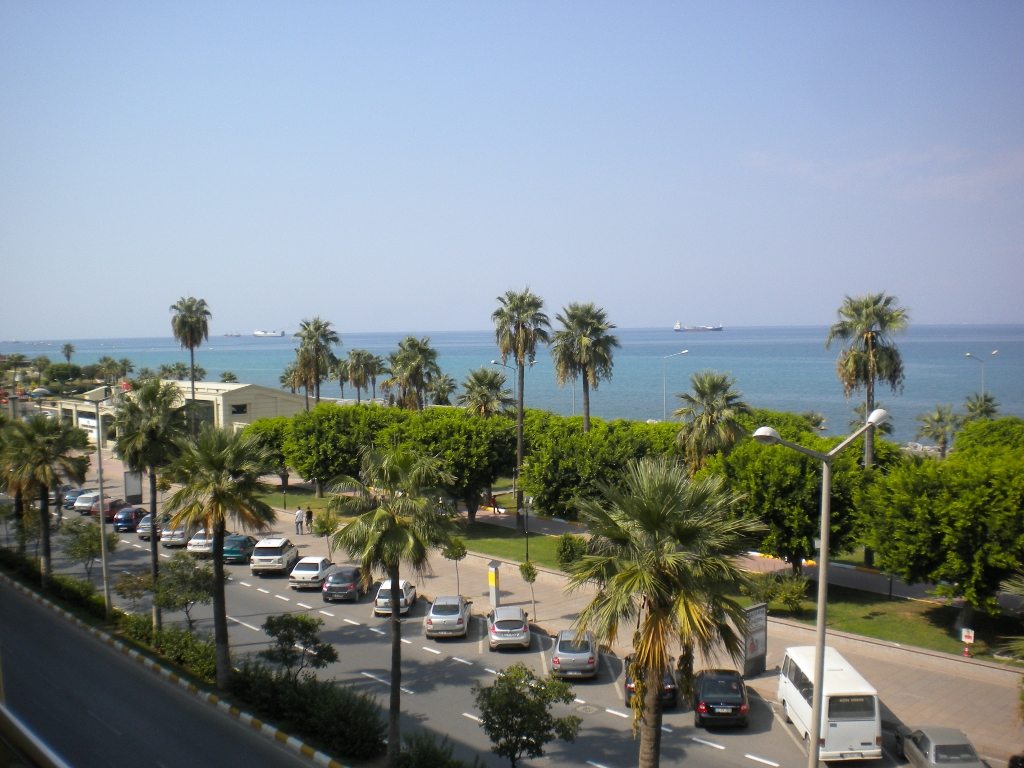
View of the Mediterranean Sea from the promenade of İskenderun

However, in the later Ottoman period the city developed as the main port on the Mediterranean for the overland trade from Baghdad and India, which had great importance until the establishment of the Egyptian overland route. Alexandretta served as a base, first for Genoese and Venetian merchants, then Western and Northern European merchants. The British Levant Company maintained an agency and factory here for 200 years, until 1825, in spite of high mortality among its employees because of regional disease, some due to lack of sanitation systems. During the 19th century the port grew, and the road to Aleppo was improved. Sanitation was also improved, and the railway was built in 1912.

At the outset of World War I, when Britain was contemplating the partition of the Ottoman Empire, Lord Kitchener considered the conquest of Alexandretta to be essential in providing Britain with a port and railhead from which to access Iraq. He proposed a new railway be built to the east from Alexandretta, which would greatly reduce the time for reaching India from the UK. The De Bunsen Committee (8 April – 30 June 1915), a British inter-departmental group which was set up to discuss the issue in greater detail, preferred Haifa for this purpose.

Ultimately the British decided not to attack the Ottoman Empire via Alexandretta. On 8 February 1915 the French foreign minister, Théophile Delcassé, protested to Britain's Foreign Secretary, Sir Edward Grey about such an attack, citing a commitment that Britain made in 1912 that it had no designs on Syria. The German field marshal, Hindenburg, later said that

Perhaps not the whole course of the war, but certainly the fate of our Ottoman Ally, could have been settled out of hand, if England had secured a decision in that region, or even seriously attempted it. Possession of the country south of the Tauras [mountains] would have been lost to Turkey at a blow if the English had succeeded in landing at Alexandretta.

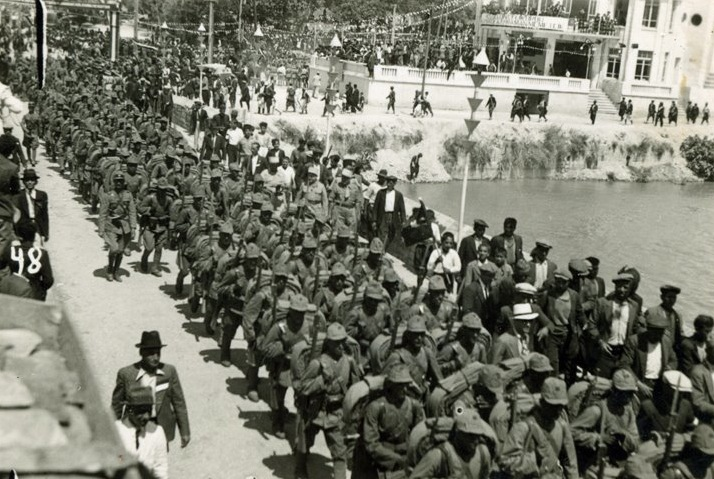
Turkish forces under Colonel Şükrü Kanatlı entered İskenderun on 5 July 1938

Armenians, who have maintained a cultural and economic presence in Iskenderun for centuries, most notably due to trade, were wiped out in the Hamidian Massacres, Adana Massacres, and the Armenian genocide, after centuries of discrimination.

=== Republic of Hatay ===
Following the collapse of the Ottoman Empire at the end of the First World War, most of Hatay, including İskenderun, was occupied by French troops.

In July 1920, the San Remo conference did not assign the Alexandretta sanjak to Turkey. Between 1921 and 1937, the city was part of the autonomous Sanjak of Alexandretta within French-controlled Syria, under the League of Nations French Mandate of Syria and the Lebanon.

The Republic of Hatay was founded in 1938 and, in 1939, it joined the Republic of Turkey after a referendum. The referendum was – and still is – regarded as illegitimate, as the Turkish government moved supporters into the city and the Turkish Army "expelled most of the province's Alawite Arabs, Greek and Armenian majority" to decide the referendum result.

In the 2010s Syria still claimed against Turkey its sovereignty on the Alexandretta region.

=== Modern era ===
At the 2013 reorganisation, İskenderun district lost a large part of its territory to the new district Arsuz.

In February 2023, the city was heavily damaged by powerful earthquakes and subsequent floods and fires. On 8 February 2023, the fire at the Port of Iskenderun was extinguished but broke out again the next day.

== Geography ==
İskenderun is located on the eastern Mediterranean coast on the Gulf of İskenderun, at the foot of the Nur Mountains (Amanos Mountains).

=== Composition ===
There are 45 neighbourhoods in İskenderun District:

- Akarca
- Akçay
- Aşkarbeyli
- Azganlık
- Barbaros
- Barıştepe
- Bekbele
- Bitişik
- Buluttepe
- Büyükdere
- Çay
- Cebike
- Çınarlı
- Cırtıman
- Cumhuriyet
- Denizciler
- Dumlupınar
- Esentepe
- Fatihsultan
- Gültepe
- Gürsel
- Güzelçay
- Hürriyet
- İsmet İnönü
- Kaledibi
- Karayılan
- Kavaklıoluk
- Kocatepe
- Kurtuluş
- Meydan
- Modernevler
- Muradiye
- Mustafa Kemal
- Numune
- Orhangazi
- Pınarbaşı
- Pirireis
- Sakarya
- Sarıseki
- Savaş
- Suçıkağı
- Süleymaniye
- Yenişehir
- Yıldırımtepe
- Yunusemre

=== Climate ===
İskenderun has a Mediterranean climate with hot, dry summers, and mild, moderately rainy winters (Köppen: Csa, Trewartha: Cs). At certain times of the year the town is swept by a strong wind called 'Yarıkkaya'. The countryside contains large areas of fruit groves. It is an important producer of oranges, tangerines and lemons, and even tropical fruits such as mangoes.

Climate data for İskenderun (1991-2020 normals, extremes 1975-2010)
Month	Jan	Feb	Mar	Apr	May	Jun	Jul	Aug	Sep	Oct	Nov	Dec	Year
Record high °C (°F)	25.0 (77.0)	26.4 (79.5)	33.9 (93.0)	39.0 (102.2)	40.0 (104.0)	37.6 (99.7)	37.2 (99.0)	38.8 (101.8)	40.0 (104.0)	37.4 (99.3)	31.2 (88.2)	26.5 (79.7)	40.0 (104.0)
Mean daily maximum °C (°F)	15.7 (60.3)	16.7 (62.1)	19.5 (67.1)	22.8 (73.0)	26.2 (79.2)	29.2 (84.6)	31.5 (88.7)	32.3 (90.1)	31.1 (88.0)	28.0 (82.4)	22.3 (72.1)	17.4 (63.3)	24.4 (75.9)
Daily mean °C (°F)	12.1 (53.8)	12.9 (55.2)	15.5 (59.9)	18.6 (65.5)	22.3 (72.1)	25.8 (78.4)	28.4 (83.1)	29.2 (84.6)	27.3 (81.1)	23.7 (74.7)	18.1 (64.6)	13.8 (56.8)	20.7 (69.3)
Mean daily minimum °C (°F)	9.1 (48.4)	9.6 (49.3)	12.0 (53.6)	15.2 (59.4)	19.1 (66.4)	22.9 (73.2)	25.9 (78.6)	26.6 (79.9)	24.1 (75.4)	20.1 (68.2)	14.6 (58.3)	10.8 (51.4)	17.5 (63.5)
Record low °C (°F)	−0.8 (30.6)	−0.3 (31.5)	0.4 (32.7)	5.1 (41.2)	11.2 (52.2)	14.8 (58.6)	18.6 (65.5)	18.6 (65.5)	15.4 (59.7)	2.5 (36.5)	2.4 (36.3)	0.8 (33.4)	−0.8 (30.6)
Average precipitation mm (inches)	97.4 (3.83)	95.6 (3.76)	84.6 (3.33)	64.7 (2.55)	54.3 (2.14)	30.9 (1.22)	12.8 (0.50)	24.6 (0.97)	51.3 (2.02)	67.4 (2.65)	80.4 (3.17)	97.2 (3.83)	761.2 (29.97)
Average precipitation days (≥ 1 mm)	9.1	8.6	8.4	7.0	4.9	2.6	2.1	2.2	4.9	6.0	6.1	8.5	70.4
Average relative humidity (%)	59.1	59.5	62.2	65.7	67.8	69.0	70.5	69.9	64.4	58.9	54.0	57.6	63.2
Mean monthly sunshine hours	127.8	145.5	192.6	213.2	271.8	294.6	287.4	270.5	252.3	223.7	167.2	125.7	2,572.3
Source 1: NOAA
Source 2: Devlet Meteoroloji İşleri Genel Müdürlüğü (extremes)

Iskenderun mean sea temperature
Jan	Feb	Mar	Apr	May	Jun	Jul	Aug	Sep	Oct	Nov	Dec
17.6 °C (63.7 °F)	16.4 °C (61.5 °F)	16.6 °C (61.9 °F)	17.6 °C (63.7 °F)	20.9 °C (69.6 °F)	24.8 °C (76.6 °F)	27.5 °C (81.5 °F)	28.5 °C (83.3 °F)	27.8 °C (82.0 °F)	25.4 °C (77.7 °F)	21.5 °C (70.7 °F)	18.9 °C (66.0 °F)

== Demographics ==
19th-century traveler Martin Hartmann put the population of Iskenderun at roughly 500 households with no entry on ethnicity. Out of the 29 other settlements he listed in the Ottoman nahiyah of Iskenderun, 19 were Turkish (366 houses), 2 were Alawite (100 houses), 2 were Turkish-Alawite mixed (28 houses), and no information was listed for the remaining 6. He did not list any Sunni Arab households.

== Main sights ==
- The Cathedral of the Annunciation is the seat of the Roman Catholic Apostolic Vicariate of Anatolia.
- Bakras (Bagras) Castle, which was built in antiquity and restored many times in later centuries (particularly during the Crusades, when it was a stronghold of the Knights Templar), served as a watchtower on the 27 km (17 mi) mountain road from İskenderun to Antakya (Antioch).
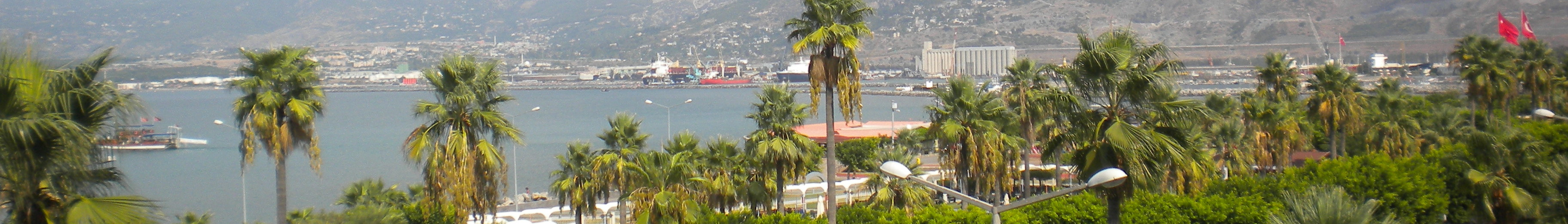
Panoramic view of the Gulf of İskenderun from İskenderun's district center

== Gallery ==
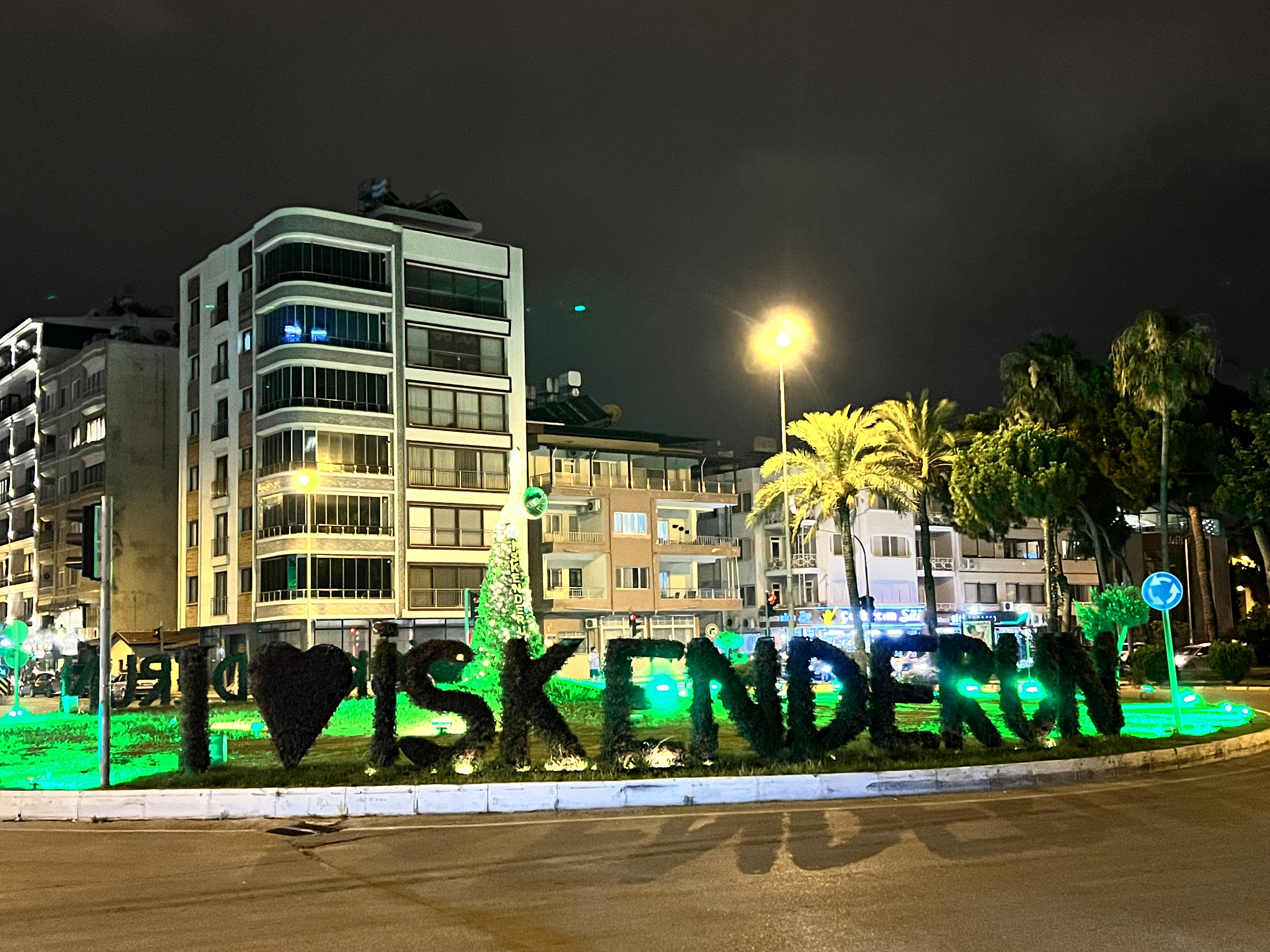
"I ♥ İskenderun" sign in the city centre

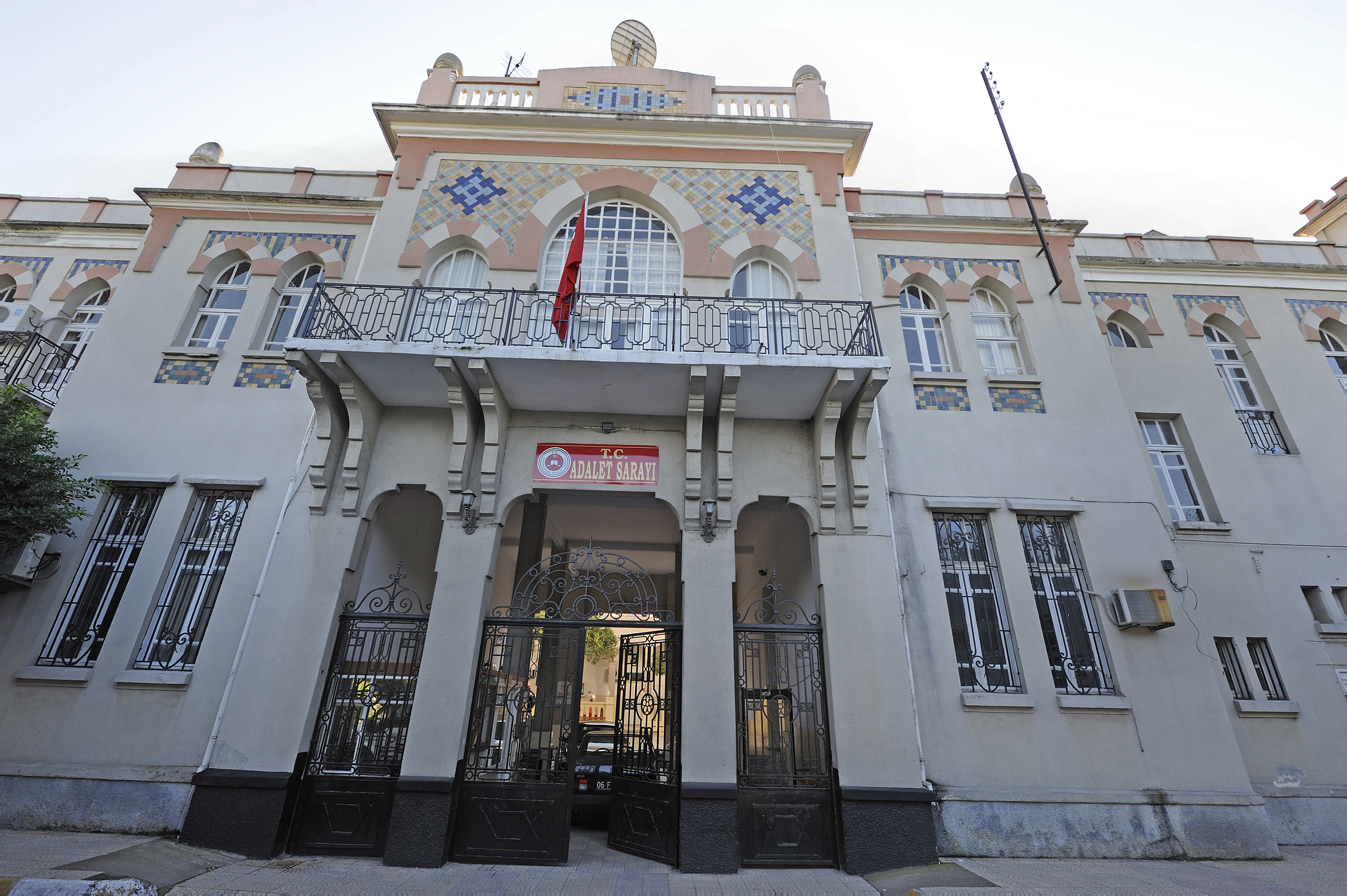
Iskenderun Courthouse

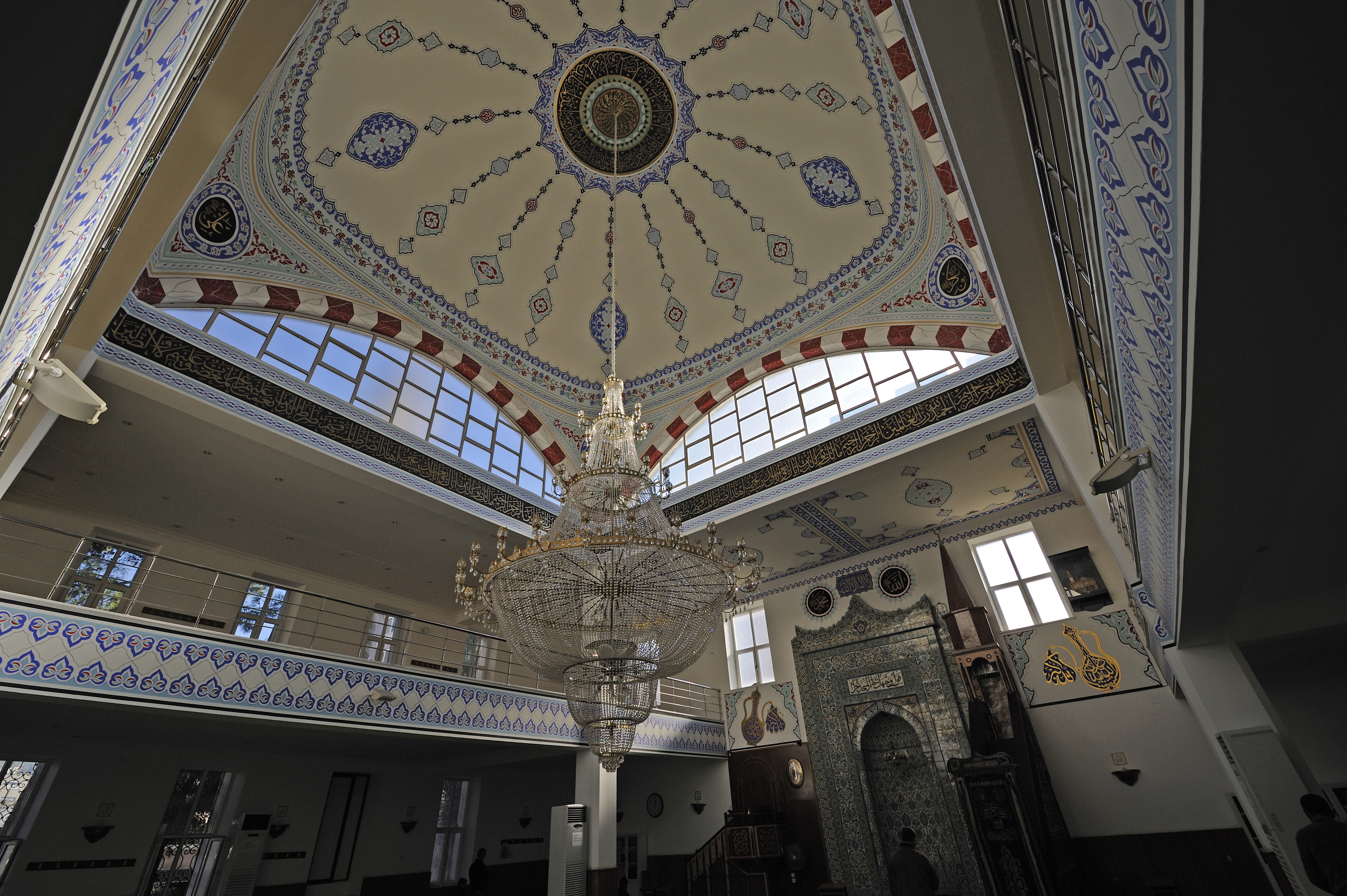
Interior of Ulu Mosque in İskenderun

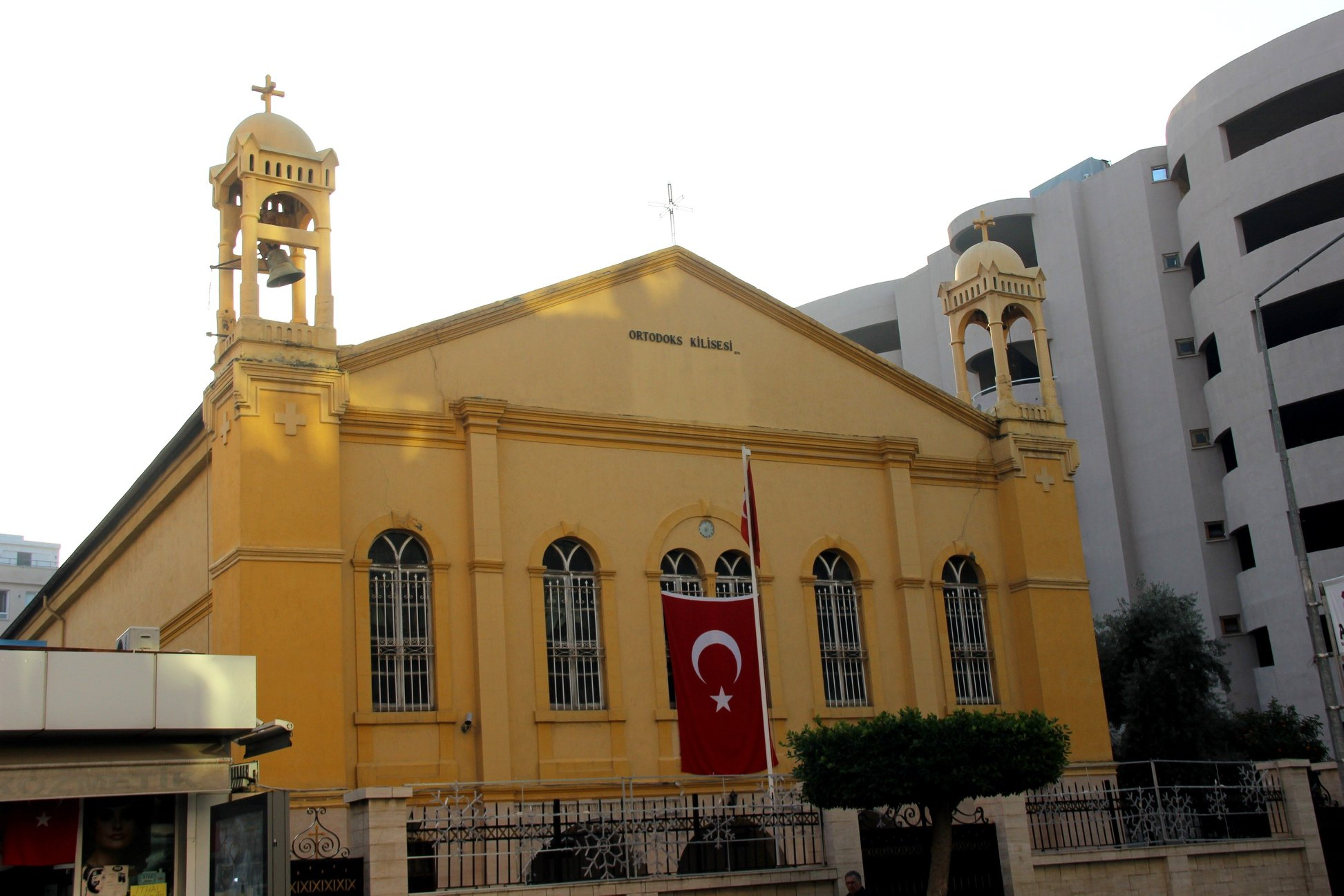
İskenderun Orthodox Church

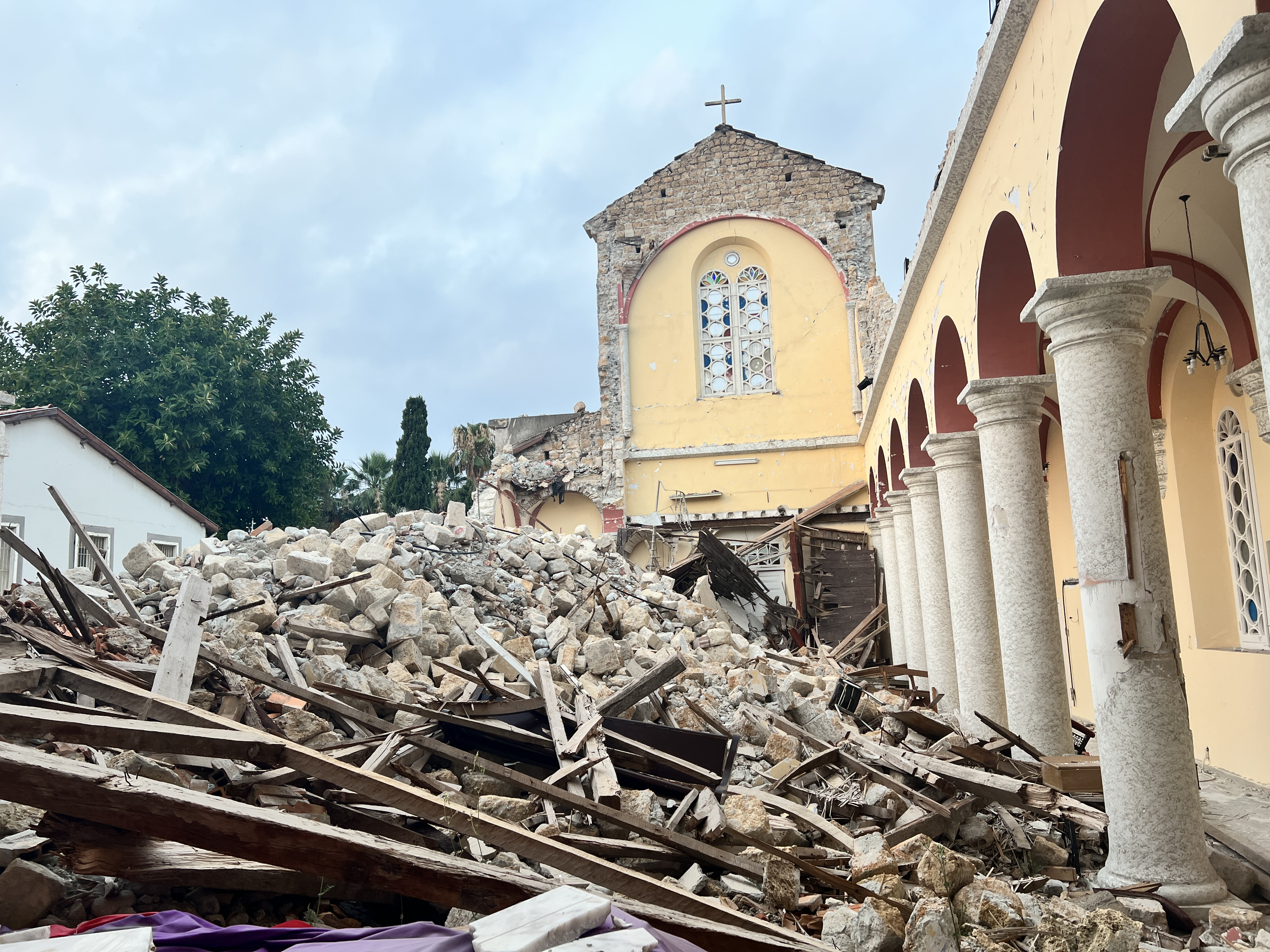
The ruins of the Catholic Cathedral of the Annunciation

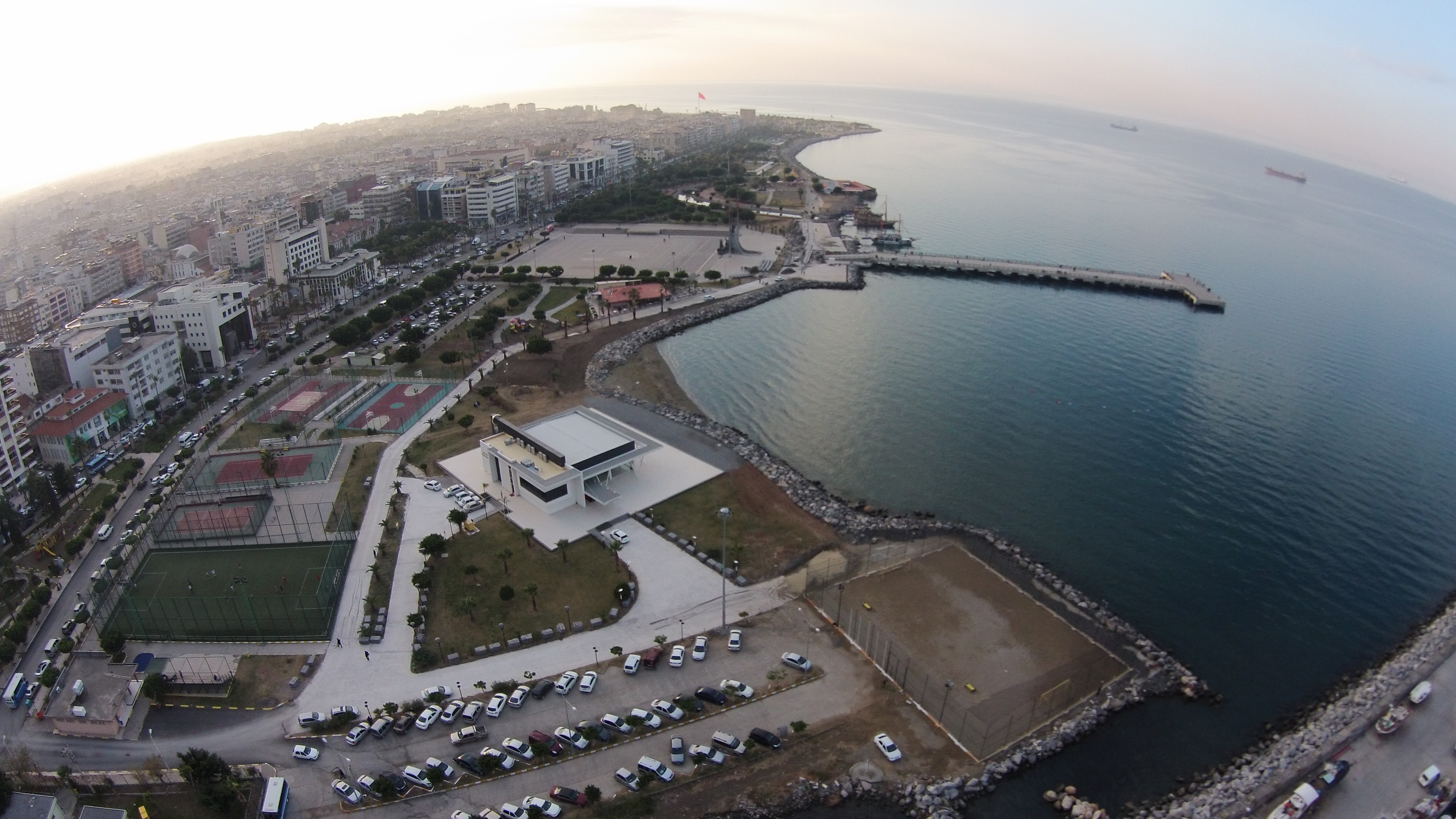
İskenderun port

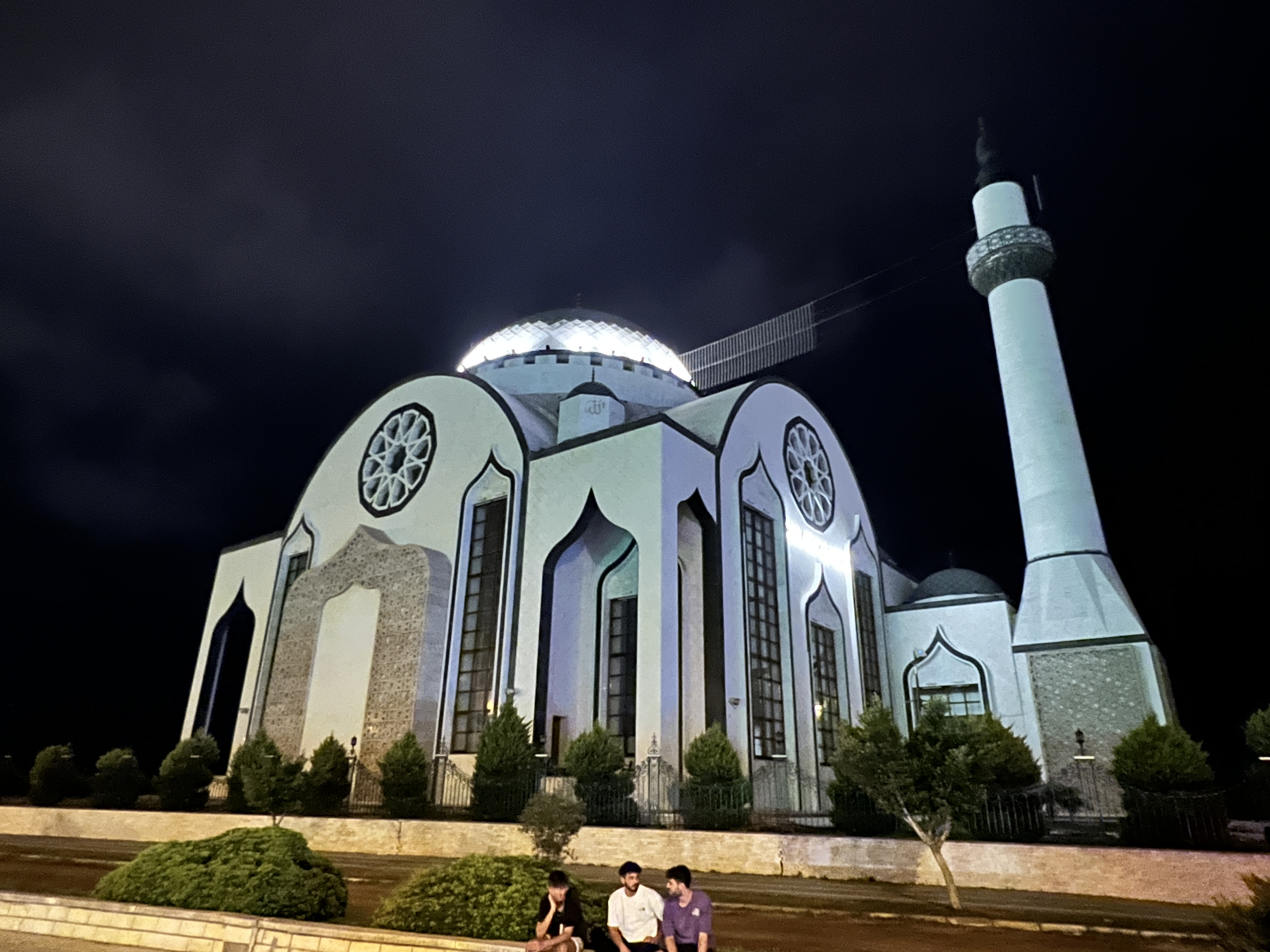
Nihal Atakaş Mosque

== Culture ==
=== Cuisine ===
Distinctive İskenderun dishes include Künefe, a hot dessert with cheese. The main dishes include the Turkish staples such as döner and other kebabs served in the flat dürüm bread, lahmacun and also Antakya influenced cuisine including kibbeh, and sour pomegranate syrup used as a salad dressing. İskenderun in particular offers good quality fish and prawns.

=== Media ===
İskenderun is served by the Güney Gazetesi newspaper.

== Sports ==
The city has two association football clubs. One of them is Körfez İskenderunspor. The more successful İskenderunspor folded in 2006, although a phoenix club İskenderunspor 1967 was then founded in 2009.

The city's basketball team is called İskenderun Belediyesi Spor Kulübü.

== In popular culture ==
İskenderun is featured in the film Indiana Jones and the Last Crusade as an important starting point for the Grail map. The State of Hatay is depicted as being ruled by a Sultan, although it was technically a transitional republic.

== Notable natives ==
- Helenus of Alexandria (Cilicia), local bishop in the 2nd or 3rd century
- Sarkis Soghanalian (1929–2011), aka Merchant of Death, a Syrian-Lebanese-Armenian private arms dealer
- Yalçın Küçük (1938–2026), a Turkish socialist writer, economist, historian and media pundit
- Erol Erdinç (born 1945), a Turkish conductor of classical music, composer, pianist and educator
- Cem Erman (1947–2011), a Turkish film actor
- Yasin Özdenak (born 1948), a Turkish football goalkeeper
- Nilüfer Çınar Çorlulu (born 1962), a Turkish Woman Chess International Master
- Uğur Şahin (born 1965), a German oncologist and immunologist
- Jehan Barbur (born 1980), a Turkish singer-songwriter
- Selçuk İnan (born 1985), a football coach and former player with 488 club caps and 61 for Turkey

== See also ==
- Çukurova
- Hatay Province
- Names of Asian cities in different languages
- Indiana Jones and the Last Crusade
- List of cities founded by Alexander the Great
