= Patriarchate of Jerusalem =

Patriarchate, Bishopric, Diocese/Archdiocese, Exarchate, or Territory of Jerusalem may refer to:

== Bishopric (pre-451) ==
- Early bishops of Jerusalem until the Council of Chalcedon in 451

== Patriarchates ==
- Greek Orthodox Patriarchate of Jerusalem (Eastern Orthodox Church)
- Latin Patriarchate of Jerusalem (Latin Catholic Church)
- Armenian Patriarchate of Jerusalem (Armenian Apostolic Church)

== Others ==
- Anglican Diocese of Jerusalem (Anglican Communion)
- Armenian Catholic Patriarchal Exarchate of Jerusalem and Amman (Armenian Catholic Church)
- Chaldean Catholic Territory of Jerusalem (Chaldean Catholic Church)
- Coptic Orthodox Archdiocese of Jerusalem (Coptic Orthodox Church)
- Maronite Catholic Patriarchal Exarchate of Jerusalem and Palestine (Maronite Catholic Church)
- Melkite Greek Catholic Patriarchal Dependent Territory of Jerusalem (Melkite Greek Catholic Church)
- Syriac Catholic Patriarchal Exarchate of Jerusalem (Syriac Catholic Church)
- (Syriac Orthodox) Patriarchal Vicariate of Jerusalem and Jordan (Syriac Orthodox Church)

== See also ==
- Dioceses of the Church of the East to 1318, including Jerusalem
- Early Christianity
- Greek Orthodox Patriarch of Jerusalem
- Jerusalem in Christianity
- List of Armenian patriarchs of Jerusalem
- Pentarchy, system by which the Christian Church was governed by the heads of the five major episcopal sees of the Roman Empire including Jerusalem
  - Patriarchate of Alexandria (disambiguation)
  - Patriarchate of Antioch
  - Patriarchate of Constantinople (disambiguation)
  - See of Rome led by the pope as the bishop of Rome
