= Reactions to the 2023 Turkey–Syria earthquakes =

Following the 2023 Turkey–Syria earthquakes, various business, government and social factors came into play, including criticism of the response by the governments of both nations, censorship of certain social media, and widespread arrests for the liability of collapsed buildings. In response to the earthquakes, national mourning was declared in Turkey and in other countries, and most foreign leaders offered condolences and support for both Turkey and Syria.

== Reactions in Turkey ==
=== Government criticism ===
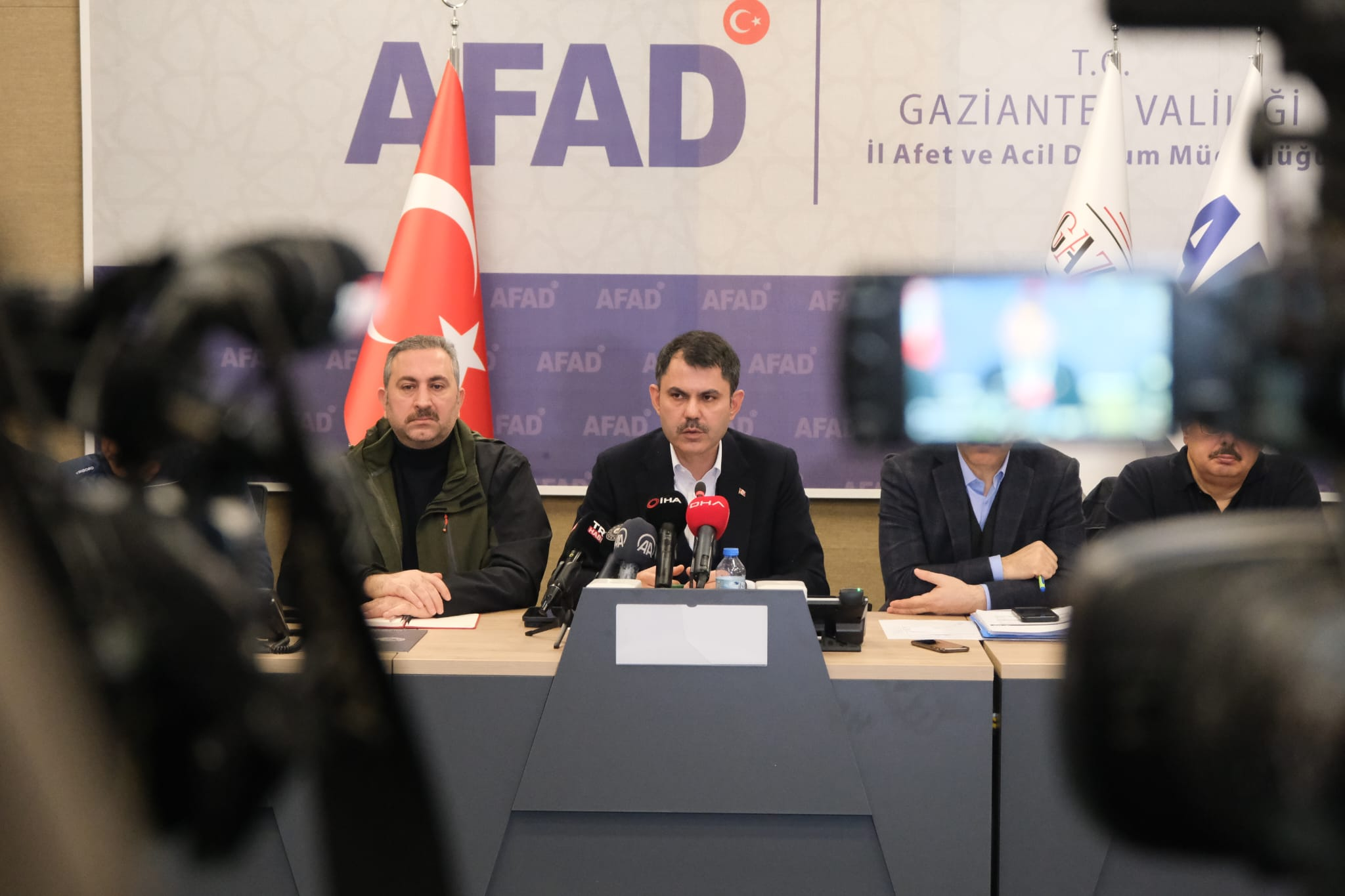
Murat Kurum, Minister of Environment, Urbanization and Climate Change at an AFAD press conference

The Turkish government was criticized on social media for allegedly trying to cover up the fact that there were not two, but three mainshocks above M_{w} 7. However, professor Hasan Sözbilir, Director of Dokuz Eylül University (DEU) Earthquake Research and Application Center, told Anadolu Agency that there were only 2 mainshocks reaching above M_{w} 7 between 6 and 17 February 2023, but of the smaller quakes, there was one that reached M_{w} 6.7. Additional allegations were made when the death toll in Turkey was at 41,000, could in fact be up to five times higher. The Justice and Development Party (AKP) government was accused of manipulating the death toll of the earthquakes to mask the scale of the disaster amid growing criticism due to what many say was a delayed and ineffective response to the tragedy.

The collapse of many newly constructed buildings caused public anger and doubts about the Turkish construction and contracting industry following seismic codes. After the 1999 İzmit earthquake, new building codes were enacted to make buildings more resilient to earthquakes. The quality of the concrete is often a factor in collapse, especially in older buildings, but the engineering and design of newer high rise buildings, and improper placement of support columns and beams, may contribute to collapse. The building codes, last updated in 2018, required quality standards in engineering design, construction and material. There were complaints that the building codes were poorly enforced.

After the earthquake, president Recep Tayyip Erdoğan had claimed "98 percent of the destroyed buildings were built in before 1999" and described it "as the indicator of an improvement in the quality of building codes and enforcement". Erdoğan's claim was criticized by civil engineer and earthquake engineering academic Haluk Sucuoğlu, stating that field observations and more than half of the buildings in earthquake-affected areas being built after 2000 making Erdoğan's claims unlikely, though accepting that concrete data on the destroyed buildings do not exist yet. The comparison of historical satellite images with those taken after the earthquake, especially of those showing the destruction in the newly built area of western Kahramanmaraş, were used to dispute Erdoğan's claim.

In Adıyaman, the minister of transport and infrastructure, Adil Karaismailoğlu, and governor, Mahmut Çuhadar, were met with protests by locals. The state car of the governor was also kicked by protesters. Turkish engineers previously warned that cities could become 'graveyards' with building amnesty. Critics of Erdoğan said contractors of housing projects were allowed to skip vital safety mandates which put residents at risk. Videos from several years earlier showed Erdoğan applauding housing projects which collapsed in the earthquake. During a campaign stop in anticipation of the March 2019 local elections, he listed, among his government's top attainment, new housing in Kahramanmaraş. Erdoğan said "We solved the problem of 144,156 citizens of Maras with zoning amnesty," In another video, he said "We have solved the problems of 205,000 citizens of Hatay with zoning peace."

Before the 2018 general election, 3.1 million buildings were granted amnesty certificates, according to Istanbul Metropolitan Municipality Secretary General Assistant and city planner, Bugra Gokce. In the ten affected provinces, 294,165 certificates were granted; 59,247 in Adana; 10,629 in Adıyaman; 14,719 in Diyarbakır; 40,224 in Gaziantep; 56,464 in Hatay; 39,58 in Kahramanmaraş; 4,897 in Kilis; 22,299 in Malatya; 21,107 in Osmaniye; and 25,521 in Şanlıurfa. After a destructive earthquake struck İzmir in 2020, Asia Times said the Turkish government generated US$2 billion in profit since the latest zoning amnesty law was approved in May 2018. During that earthquake, there were 811,000 certificates linked to illegal construction in İzmir.

The leader of the opposition in Parliament, Kemal Kılıçdaroğlu of the Republican People's Party (CHP), pinned responsibility for the scale of the disaster on Erdoğan. He demanded from the CHP mayors not to back down from providing bread and blankets to people in need and reject bureaucratic blocking as they did during the COVID-19 lockdown. It has also been reported that some donations from relief organizations arriving at the Adana airport were relabeled as assistance by the Disaster and Emergency Management Presidency (AFAD) or also the governing AKP. Questions also arose as to how an "earthquake tax" (officially "special communications tax") levied by the Turkish government in the wake of the 1999 earthquake, estimated to have reached 88bn lira ($4.6bn; £3.8bn) and meant to have been spent on disaster prevention and the development of emergency services, were spent, given how the government has never given a public explanation.

Some Kurdish and Alevi residents alleged discrimination and neglect in the government's recovery efforts. The pro-Kurdish Peoples' Democratic Party (HDP) accused Turkish authorities of preventing equal distribution of aid and favoring areas inhabited majorly by people loyal to the governing AKP.

==== Disaster management ====
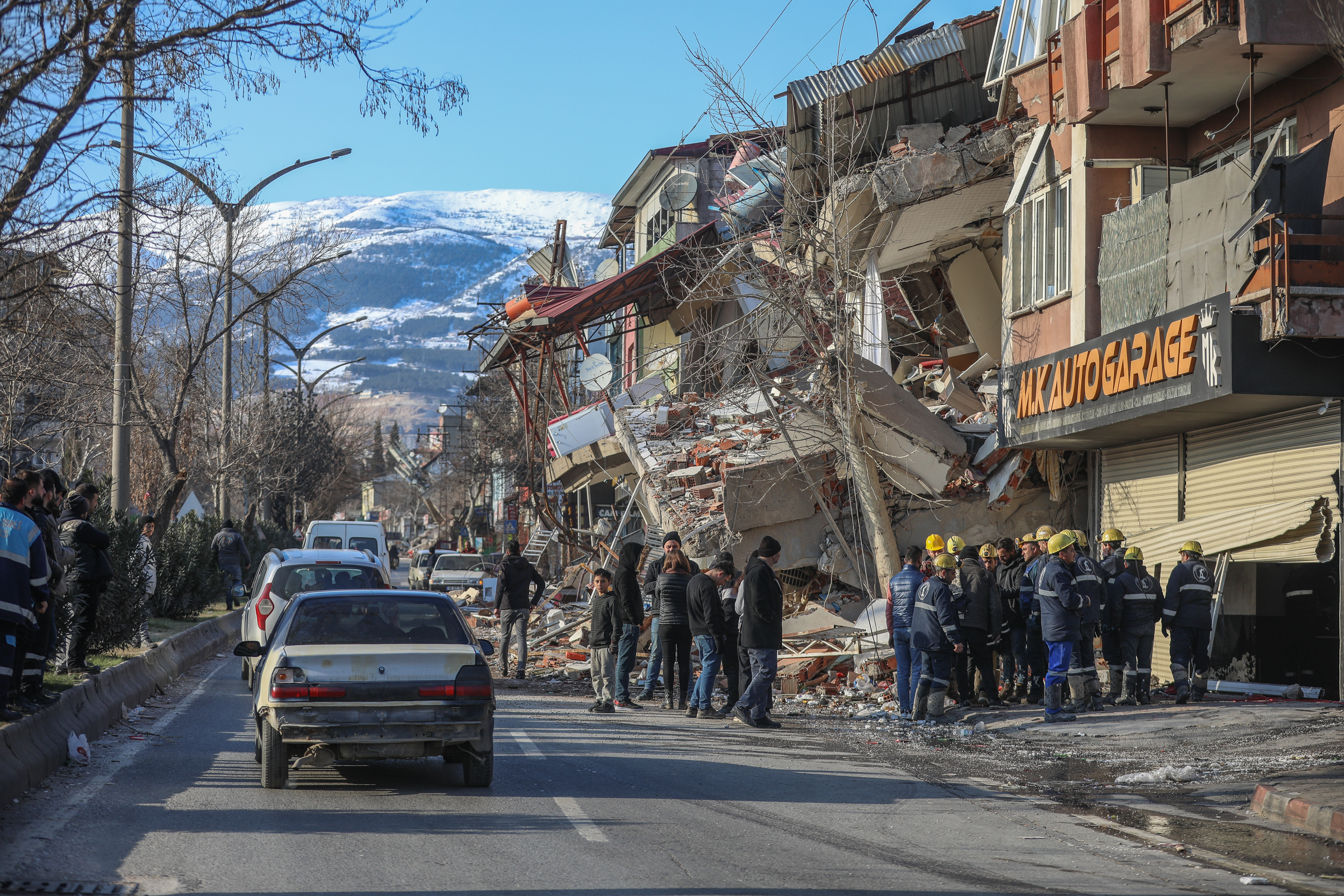
Kahramanmaraş after the earthquake

AFAD, the state organ for the disaster relief, was criticized on the grounds of slowness during the first days of the earthquake. There were reports of unsuccessful attempts by people to contact AFAD. Emergency management academic Kubilay Kaptan stated that the delayed reaction of AFAD was mainly caused by the increasing centralization of Turkish emergency response agencies under the current government. According to Kaptan, numerous relief agencies were merged into AFAD in the past years and since the implementation of the referendum, AFAD became part of the Ministry of Interior, losing its autonomy and self-governance. Kaptan added that the Ministry of Interior, responsible for making decisions, hindered the fast response since the organization required approval for its actions, contrasting more independent agencies like FEMA in the United States. AFAD was also criticized on the claims of inappropriate board of management, since some members of the board had no disaster management background. İsmail Palakoğlu, the general manager of disaster response subdivision of AFAD and a theologian who previously worked at the Directorate of Religious Affairs, was criticized by several politicians and media outlets.

Another criticism was the late deployment of military resources. They were not mobilized for two days after the earthquake, and even then in what many considered in very modest amounts. There were many instances where aid was forced to go through local governors, who were not elected but appointed by the government. In some instances, aid was held by the ruling party with the explanation that it would be managed by AFAD. There were reports of aid trucks stopped and not let through unless ruling party placards and signs were placed on them, including stickers of the president placed on individual aid packages. On 16 February the district governor of Pazarcik accompanied by the gendarmerie seized aid stored in a distribution center established jointly by the HDP and the Hasankoca Neighborhood Assistance and Solidarity Association in presence of the head of the Diyarbakır Chamber of Industry arguing they could not distribute aid independently.

On 9 February 2023, the governing alliance between the MHP and the AKP approved a state of emergency in 10 provinces affected by the earthquakes. The opposition voted no to the measure, claiming that it was unnecessary since the provinces were already declared as "disaster areas".

A week after the earthquakes in Samandağ, a coastal town in Hatay Province, residents dug through the rubble to look for victims because of the slow and limited government response. "We have nothing left and the government barely helped us," one resident said, adding that assistance only came 48 hours after the earthquake.

=== Media censorship ===
NetBlocks announced that ICTA limited access to Twitter from Turkey, with Turkish government officials claiming disinformation. According to Reuters, citing an anonymous government official, the block was necessary "because in some accounts there were untrue claims, slander, insults and posts with fraudulent purposes," The block caused public anger as Twitter assisted in sharing information on arriving aid and the whereabouts of survivors still trapped in rubble. The Peoples' Democratic Party said Twitter helped in organizing aid to the affected and the block would "only cause more death." Ali Babacan, leader of the Turkey's opposition group, Democracy and Progress Party, also criticized the block.

The Committee to Protect Journalists (CPJ) issued a statement critical of fines and penalties issued to Halk TV, Tele1, and Fox over their coverage of the earthquake by the Radio and Television Supreme Council. In addition to the fines, both Halk TV and TELE1 were required to suspend airing of the shows that had criticized the government for five days. The CPJ's statement said that Turkey officials should revoke both the fine and penalties along with refraining from silencing the media for its earthquake coverage.

=== Criminal investigation ===
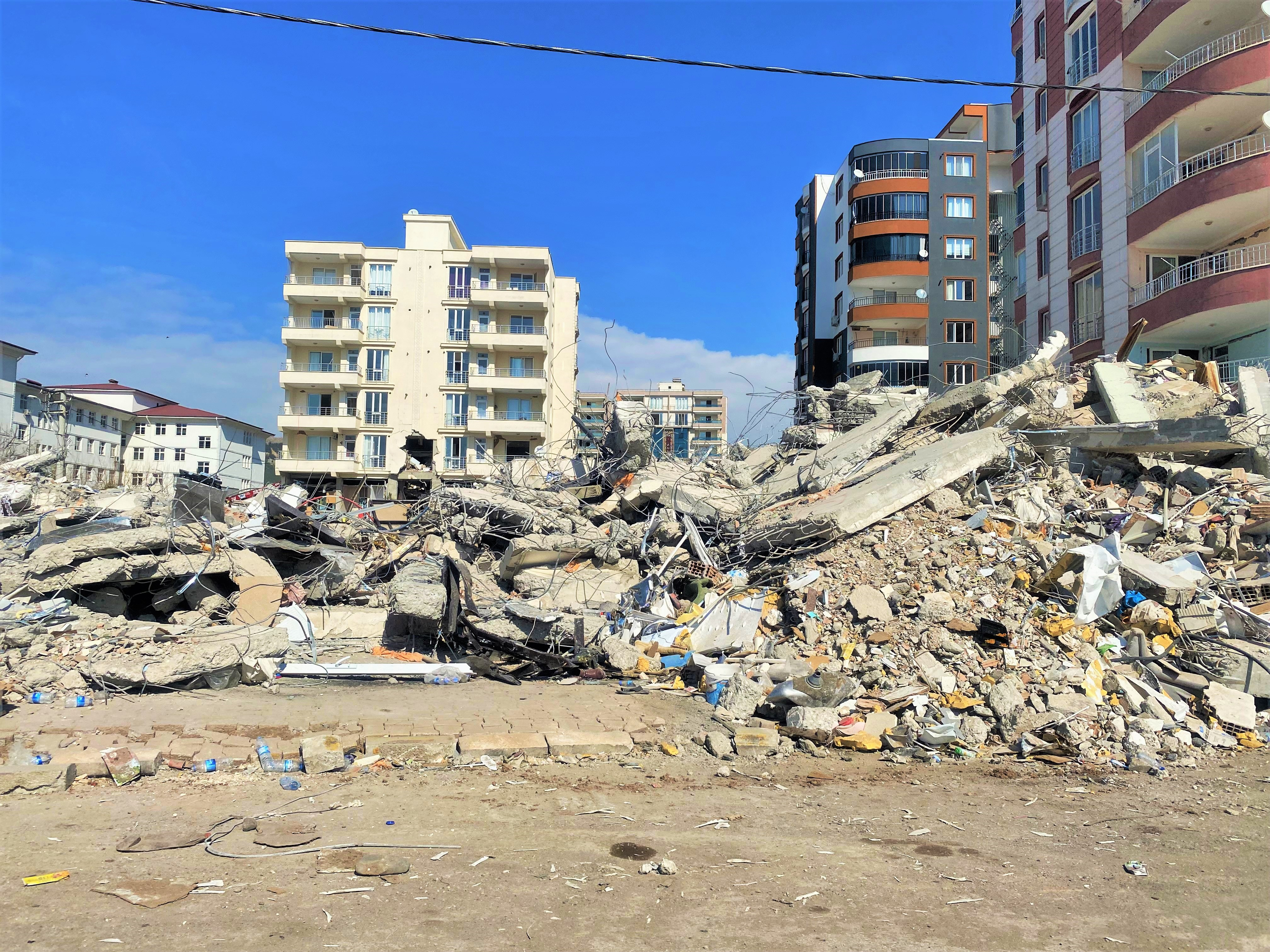
Ruins in Adıyaman

On 7 February, Turkish police said they detained four people over "provocative posts aiming to create fear and panic" on social media following the earthquake. It added that a wider investigation into social media accounts was ongoing, but offered no information on the content of the posts. The number of detentions increased to a dozen on 8 February. Following reports of property being ransacked by looters, authorities arrested 98 people for robbery or defrauding victims. Syrians have faced increased discrimination in the country, with some Turks blaming them for the looting. Amnesty International and Human Rights Watch alleged that Turkish security forces tortured and ill-treated individuals arrested on suspicion of looting. In a report from both organizations, one person died while being held by authorities. The report said allegations of torture came from 10 provinces, with most of them coming from Antakya alone.

On 9 February, minister of justice, Bekir Bozdağ, said a judicial investigation into the collapse of buildings was opened. The probe attempts to hold accountable those who constructed the buildings or bore any responsibility for their collapse in the 10 hardest-hit provinces. Bozdağ said: "Those who have negligence, faults and those responsible for the destructions after the earthquake will be identified and held accountable before the judiciary". Nearly 150 local prosecutors were authorized to establish units to investigate contractors, surveyors and other experts linked to the collapsed buildings.

On 11 February, the justice ministry announced the plan to establish the "Earthquake Crimes Investigation" bureaus. The bureaus aim to hold contractors and other responsible for construction, gathering evidence, recommendation experts; including architects geologists and engineers; and inspecting building permits and occupation permits. Vice President Fuat Oktay said 131 individuals linked to the collapse of buildings were identified.

By 25 February 612 people were investigated for their involvement in building collapses; 184 were arrested and awaiting trial. Those in jail included contractors and building owners and managers. On 12 February, the Adana Chief Public Prosecutor's Office issued arrest warrants for 62 people; Thirty one arrests were made on 14 February. In Malatya, city prosecutors issued arrest warrants for 31 people.

The Committee to Protect Journalists (CPJ) published an article on 14 February covering journalists being detained and harassed for their reporting on the earthquake in Turkey. Some of those detained were being investigated for "spreading misinformation" or for ""provoking the people into animosity and hatred" in connection with their reporting.

The owner of Rönesans Rezidans which collapsed in Hatay Province was arrested in Istanbul while attempting to leave Turkey for Montenegro. In Gaziantep Province, two people were arrested after being suspected of cutting-down columns to make extra space in a building that collapsed. Bekir Bozdağ said 163 people were being investigated for their alleged involvement. Eight people were arrested and awaiting trial while 48 were held in police detention; another seven were prohibited from leaving Turkey. Officials detained two people at Istanbul Airport attempting to flee to Georgia. Among those arrested were a man and his wife who constructed several buildings in Adiyaman which collapsed. A contractor involved in developing the Bahar Apartments in Gaziantep was detained in Istanbul after his inspections were deemed negligent. The owner of a construction company which built several buildings in Adana was apprehended in Northern Cyprus.

The majority of buildings that collapsed in Turkey were constructed before 2000, but some were constructed afterward. Following the 1999 earthquake, building construction followed new regulations and had improved materials. Sukru Ersoy, a geology professor at Yıldız Technical University, said "corruption is high in the construction sector in Turkey. And therefore, there were abuses". However, corruption was not always present in local authorities; in Erzin, which has a strict policy against the construction of buildings that violated safety codes in addition to having endured other earthquakes with less damage, became a popular location for survivors elsewhere to take refuge as no collapsed buildings were reported.

On 3 January 2024, the first trials opened in Turkey relating to the earthquake, with a court in Adiyaman trying 11 individuals accused of "conscious negligence" while overseeing the construction of the collapsed Isias Hotel. The families of those killed in the Isias Hotel collapsed testified against its owner and 10 contractors. Attorneys representing victims' families said contractors tried may be handled a less severe sentence as evidence and collapsed rubble were cleared in the aftermath.

In mid-April 2024, trials began for eight defendants; four from the construction contractor and four from a private inspector involved with the Rönesans Rezidans. All the defendants pleaded not guilty. The luxury apartment collapsed, killing at least 269 and leaving 46 missing, believed to have also died. Four of the accused were held in detention while another was reportedly on the run. At the Hatay Third High Criminal Court, they were charged with "causing the death and injury of more than one person with conscious negligence." The eight individuals face up to 22 years in jail if convicted. The director for Human Rights Watch in Turkey voiced concerns that many public officials have not gone for trial, while only individuals from private sector have. Public servants also have a role in the construction of inadequate buildings such as issuing permits and consenting to building plans. No public servant has gone to trial as of 19 April 2024.

=== Commemorations ===
On the first anniversary of the earthquake on 6 February 2024, the Turkish government organized a series of programs to mark the disaster, with schools closed in the affected regions. In Antakya, a moment of silence was held at 04:17, the time when the earthquake struck, and carnations were scattered into the Orontes River. A silent march was held in Adiyaman while President Erdoğan visited Kahramanmaraş. Protests were also held in Antakya criticizing health minister Fahrettin Koca and mayor Lütfü Savaş, with demonstrators chanting "Can anyone hear me?", a reminder of cries for rescue following the earthquake and "We won't forget, we won't forgive." In Malatya Province, the governor banned events that were not officially sanctioned until 9 February.

== National mourning ==
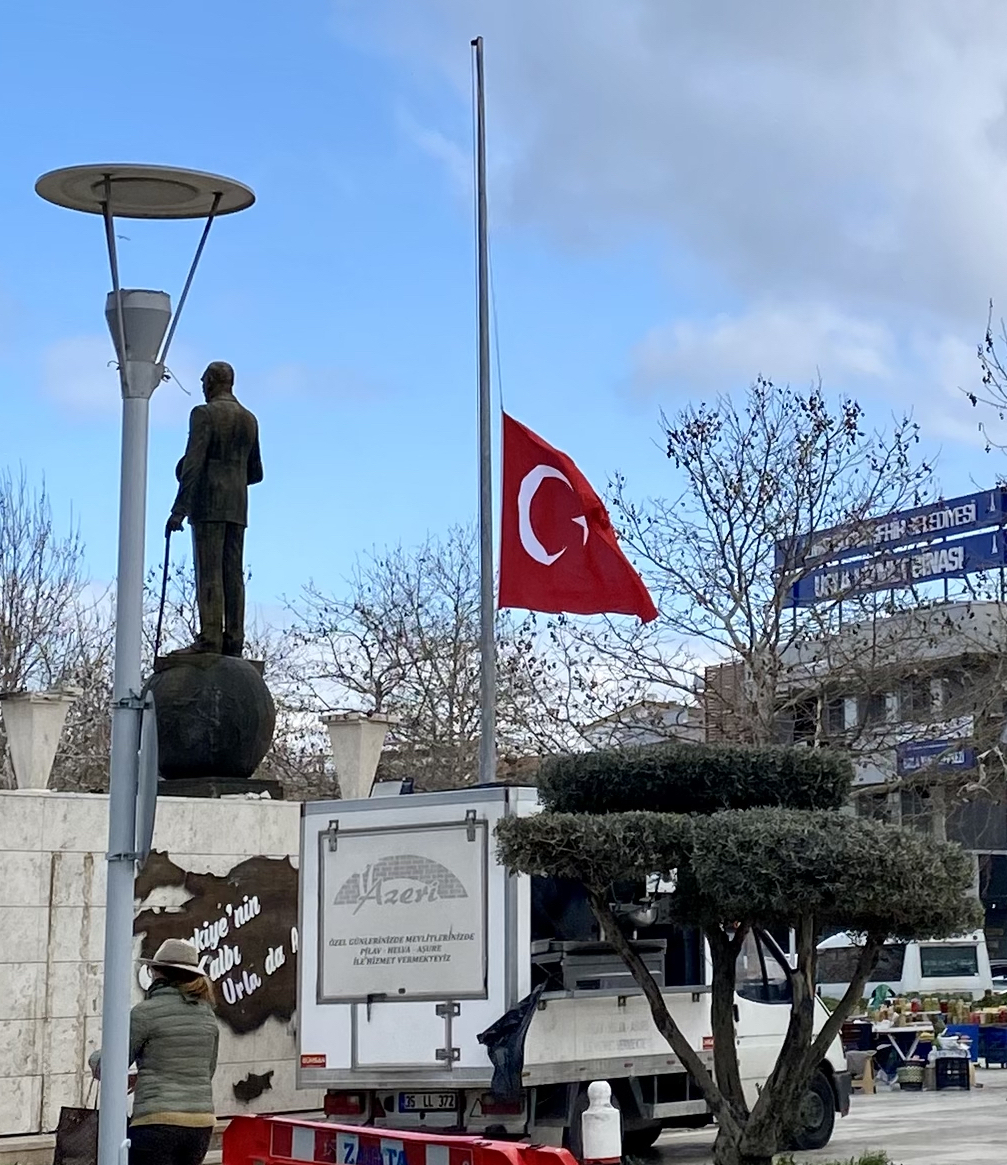
Turkish flag lowered to half-mast during the national mourning period

President Recep Tayyip Erdoğan declared seven days of national mourning in Turkey. The same period of mourning was observed in Northern Cyprus, (Note: Northern Cyprus is a de facto state that comprises the northeastern portion of the island of Cyprus. Recognised only by Turkey, Northern Cyprus is considered by the international community to be part of the Republic of Cyprus. See also Cyprus problem.) and one day was also declared in Albania, Bangladesh and Kosovo. On 13 February, all overseas diplomatic missions of North Macedonia lowered their flags to half-mast.

== Condolences ==
Condolences to Turkey and Syria were expressed by most countries that provided aid, as well as Bolivia, the Democratic Republic of the Congo, the Dominican Republic, Ghana, Grenada, Malawi, Monaco, Morocco, North Korea, Nicaragua, Peru, the Sahrawi Arab Democratic Republic, South Africa and Tonga.

President of the European Council Charles Michel and President of the European Commission Ursula von der Leyen expressed their solidarity with the Turkish and Syrian people and wished a speedy recovery to the injured. The African Union Commission, ASEAN and Organization of Turkic States, the latter of which Turkey is a founding member, also extended condolences.

== See also ==
- Humanitarian response to the 2023 Turkey–Syria earthquake
- Construction amnesty
- Seismic code
