= Floating raft system =

Seismic stabilized building foundation

Floating raft is a land-based building foundation that protects it against settlement and liquefaction of soft soil from seismic activity. It was a necessary innovation in the development of tall buildings in the wet soil of Chicago in the 19th century, when it was developed by John Wellborn Root who came up with the idea of interlacing the concrete slab with steel beams. The earliest precursor to the modern version may be the concrete rafts developed for the building of Millbank Prison in 1815 by Robert Smirke.

For a floating raft foundation – or simply "floating foundation" – the foundation has a volume such that, if that volume filled with soil, it would be equal in weight to the total weight of the structure.

When the soil is so soft that not even friction piles will support the building load, these types of foundation are the final option and makes the building behave like a boat: obeying Archimedes' principle, buoyed up by the weight of the earth displaced in creating the foundation.

== Buildings with a floating raft system ==
- Jin Mao Tower (1999) in Shanghai, China
- Rönesans Rezidans (2012) in Antakya, Turkey

== See also ==
- Buoyancy
- Building construction
