= Rönesans Rezidans =

- Rönesans Rezidans
- The front gate of the building.

- The building in its collapsed state.
- Interactive map of the Rönesans Rezidans area

General information
- Type: Residential
- Location: İnönü Blv., Antakya, Ekinci, İnönü Bulvarı No:57, Antakya/Hatay, Turkey, Antakya, Turkey
- Coordinates: 36.230288°N 36.150046°E
- Construction started: 2011
- Completed: 2012
- Destroyed: 6 February 2023

Technical details
- Floor count: 11

Other information
- Number of stores: 2
- Parking: Covered

Location in Antakya.
Location on İnönü Blv.

Rönesans Rezidans (Renaissance Residence) was a residential building in Ekinci, Antakya. It was the first luxury apartment in Hatay Province. On 6 February 2023, it was destroyed as a result of the 2023 Turkey–Syria earthquake.

The building was constructed between 2011 and 2012 as Hatay Province's first luxury apartment complex, and was the home of many well-off residents of Antakya. It was created by Antis Yapı, a company that has been around for several decades. During its collapse following the first earthquake, it is believed to have trapped or killed at least over 800 people. It has been noted that the structure of the building was strong and that it did not collapse but rather was pushed over by the earthquake as Dr. Ahmet Ercan puts it. The amplitude of the shockwave of the first earthquake centered in Gaziantep had dramatically increased by the time it was in Hatay Province causing much more intense and violent movement throughout Hatay than its origin in Gaziantep.

Architect/Engineer Yoshinori Moriwaki said that the building lacked friction piles which could have prevented the collapse. The building however did have a floating raft system. Geophysics Professor Ahmet Ercan said that the foundation of the building likely was not as deep as it should have been to prevent its collapse, saying that it appears to be about 3 metres when it should probably have been about 10.

Permits for the building were granted in 2012 by the Ekinciler Belde Municipality. According to Lütfü Savaş everything in the construction was likely done properly and in accordance with regulations.

== Design and construction ==
The building is Hatay's first residenz (Turkish: Rezidans) building. It was constructed to accommodate those working in Hatay's growing importance as a border trade city, being next to the Syrian border. It was home to around 700 residents. Other estimates put the number of residents at 1000. Its building is 12 floors high and contains 249 dwellings, 2 shops; and consists of 4 blocks. The footprint is a space of 10,500 square metres (113,000 ft^{2}).

The plans range from 44 to 174 metres (144 to 571 ft) squared. There building had amenities such as a half Olympic-sized pool, Jacuzzi, gym, sports facilities, children's playground, covered parking, secretary and reception services, walking and biking paths, wake-up service, store, 24/7 security services, and artificial waterfalls. Mehmet Yaşar Coşkun, who was chairman of the Board of Antis Yapı at the time of the development, said that this project will "create an area where all kinds of social activities can take place". The need for parking which is solved inside allows the area around the building to be free for activities to take place.

The construction process started in 2011 by Antis Yapı. The first step of the foundation was laid in a ceremony attended by Hatay MP Sadullah Ergin, Hatay governor H. Celalettin Lekesiz, mayor Lütfü Savaş, chief constable Ragıp Kılıç and mayor of Ekinci municipality Seyfettin Yeral. It was planned to be delivered during April 2013. It was completed in 2012. Antis Yapı was founded by the architect Mehmet Yaşar Coşkun and engineer Hüseyin Yalçın Coşkun.

The licence for the building was granted by the Ekinciler Belde Municipality in 2012 according to Lütfü Savaş.

It was constructed onto a floating raft foundation. It was thought to be "earthquake-proof".

== Collapse ==
The building fell over during the first major shock of the 2023 Turkey–Syria earthquake, which severely affected Hatay. In the aftermath of the collapse, it was thought that 800 people were trapped under the building. Officials recorded 269 deaths while 46 unaccounted individuals were presumed dead.

The building has become a focus of public anger, several older buildings that were nearby were still standing as of 17 February, while Rönesans Rezidans had fallen over. Dr. Ahmet Ercan, a professor of geophysics, explained on Turkish television news that the problem wasn't a lack of quality in the concrete, but rather that the foundation was not deep enough, and the shockwaves of the first earthquake arrived into Antakya with a much more amplified magnitude than they were nearer to the epicenter. According to Ercan, neither the municipality, the contractor, nor the building inspection board are at fault per se, and so he encouraged a proper analysis of the situation that takes into consideration the resonance of the ground under the building in relation to the waves of the earthquake. This investigation should be done by experts in geophysics and they should neither put the blame on anyone prematurely nor forgive them prematurely. However, the rubble of the building was already cleared out by 24 February, and despite this, it is still unknown how many people died because of the collapse.

Lütfü Savaş, mayor of Hatay Province, said that the building was a project conducted under normal conditions and was very likely constructed properly up to the earthquake standards. He backed up his confidence with the fact that the architect was an idealist and former president of the Chamber of Architects. He said that of course everyone will be questioned as it would be a disservice not and that they will look for what was missing leading to the building's collapse.

Ercan said that by the time the shockwave of the earthquake reached Antakya, it had increased instead of reducing in magnitude, so much so that it was equal but opposite to gravity. This caused buildings, even if they had strong and stable structures to experience a force that threw them up into the air from the base up and then pushed them sideways, of which Rönesans Rezidans is an example. The building is knocked over but it has not collapsed. All the columns and beams appear still strongly attached to each other showing no signs of breakage.

A rule of thumb is that for every 5 floors above ground, there should be 1 floor with curtain concrete below ground. It appears that the foundation floor is about 3 metres (9.8 ft), whereas according to this rule of thumb, it should have been about 10 metres (33 ft) deep.

In an interview, Yoshinori Moriwaki, a Japanese architect, and engineer compared Rönesans Rezidans to the surrounding buildings that had not collapsed; he said that the length of the building played a part. However, he suggested that the builders should have made use of a friction piles system, which would have increased the price of the whole project by about 10%. The stakes would go all the way down to where the ground is more stable. He noted however that despite it having fallen over there was not much damage to the structure itself, and that it was fine but also noted that no matter how strong the building is a poor foundation can lead to collapse. However, according to some sources the building was constructed on a floating raft system which is a solution used when the ground under a building is too soft even for friction piles.

He compared the relationship between the architects and engineers in Turkey vs Japan. He said that in Turkey the architect is very powerful, for example, the boss is an architect, and the engineer(s) work(s) for them. In Japan however, he says that since the 1995 Kobe earthquake and the 2011 Sendai-Miyagi earthquake, and the Fukushima disaster that followed, Japan changed the system to give more power to the engineers.

Some residents reported concerns about the buildings state already existed before the earthquake that toppled it. One resident, Zekiye Barutçu Yiğitbaşı, claimed that by 2022, the foundation had shifted and cracks began to appear in the corridor, and that her complaints to the landlord were met with ridicule.

== Residents ==
The roughly 250 residential units of the building were home to 700–1,000 people. They were generally the more wealthy residents of Antakya.

Many members of the Hatayspor team are said to have been living in the building. Team manager Volkan Demirel also had lived in the building and has said that two of his neighbors died. Player Christian Atsu and technical director Taner Savut were among the members of Hatayspor be under the wreckage, a thermal imaging camera determined signs of life in the wreckage and it was reported that Atsu had been rescued but that Savut is still missing, however it was later reported that Atsu was also still missing. Atsu is believed to have been on the 9th floor when the building collapsed, his body was found by 18 February confirming that he had died. Taner Savut was also later identified and confirmed dead in a hospital in Adana. Handball player Cemal Kütahya along with his wife and kids, and educator Hülya Aydın have also been reported missing in the wreckage. Kutahya and one of his sons have since been reported dead. Ambassador Devrim Öztürk's body could not be located in the aftermath.

The building is also said to have been the home of many doctors. Doctor Şebnem Turan Adıgüzel who was rescued from the rubble said that some of her colleagues had died.

== Rescue efforts ==
A Hungarian rescue team removed 12 survivors from the wreckage. Hungarian Firefighter Lieutenant Colonel Dániel Mukics personally rescued a resident named Selma from the wreckage at the 47th hour. He was part of a 55-person team. A team of 75 Turkish coal miners removed 40 survivors from the wreckage in the 7 consecutive days that they were at the scene. A team from China has also been working building. The Erzurum Search and Rescue Team (ERAKUT) who belong to the Erzurum Metropolitan Municipality Fire Brigade Department also arrived at the scene and were involved in the rescuing of a 9-year-old boy.

== Arrests ==
The contractor of the building, Mehmet Yaşar Coşkun, was arrested at the airport in Istanbul. He was on his way to Montenegro where he said he was working on some other projects. He said his trip had nothing to do with the earthquake and that he was not fleeing. He was sent to Metris Prison. The locations of the project manager İbrahim Dahiroğlu and the site manager Bayram Mansuroğlu are unknown. Coşkuns lawyer stated that "the public is looking for a criminal, a culprit. My client was picked as this culprit". Coşkun said that the building was solid and had all the necessary licenses.
