= Mahmut Çuhadar =

Turkish bureaucrat

Governor of Adıyaman
- In office 9 June 2020 – 10 March 2023
- Preceded by: Aykut Pekmez

Personal details
- Born: 1967 (age 58–59) Bafra, Samsun
- Children: 2
- Education: Ankara University

Mahmut Çuhadar (born 1967) is a Turkish bureaucrat. He served as governor of Adıyaman from 2020 to 2023. He has a wife and two children.

== Early life and education ==
Çuhadar was born in 1967 in Bafra, Samsun He completed all of his education in Bafra. He graduated from Ankara University in 1988.

== Career ==
Çuhadar was appointed governor of Adıyaman on June 9, 2020.

== Criticism ==
During the 2023 Turkey–Syria earthquake, Çuhadar faced protests from local residents over the lack of aid provided to the affected areas. He received more criticism after he was filmed laughing in front of the grieving people who lost their relatives in Adıyaman. The next day, he was protested again alongside the Minister of Transport and Infrastructure Adil Karaismailoğlu. Former AKP deputy Mehmet Metiner defended Çuhadar by saying: "Should he have cried instead of laughing?" He resigned soon after on March 10, 2023. However, he cited health issues instead of the incident as explanation for his resignation.
