= Cemal Kütahya =

Turkish handball player (1990–2023)

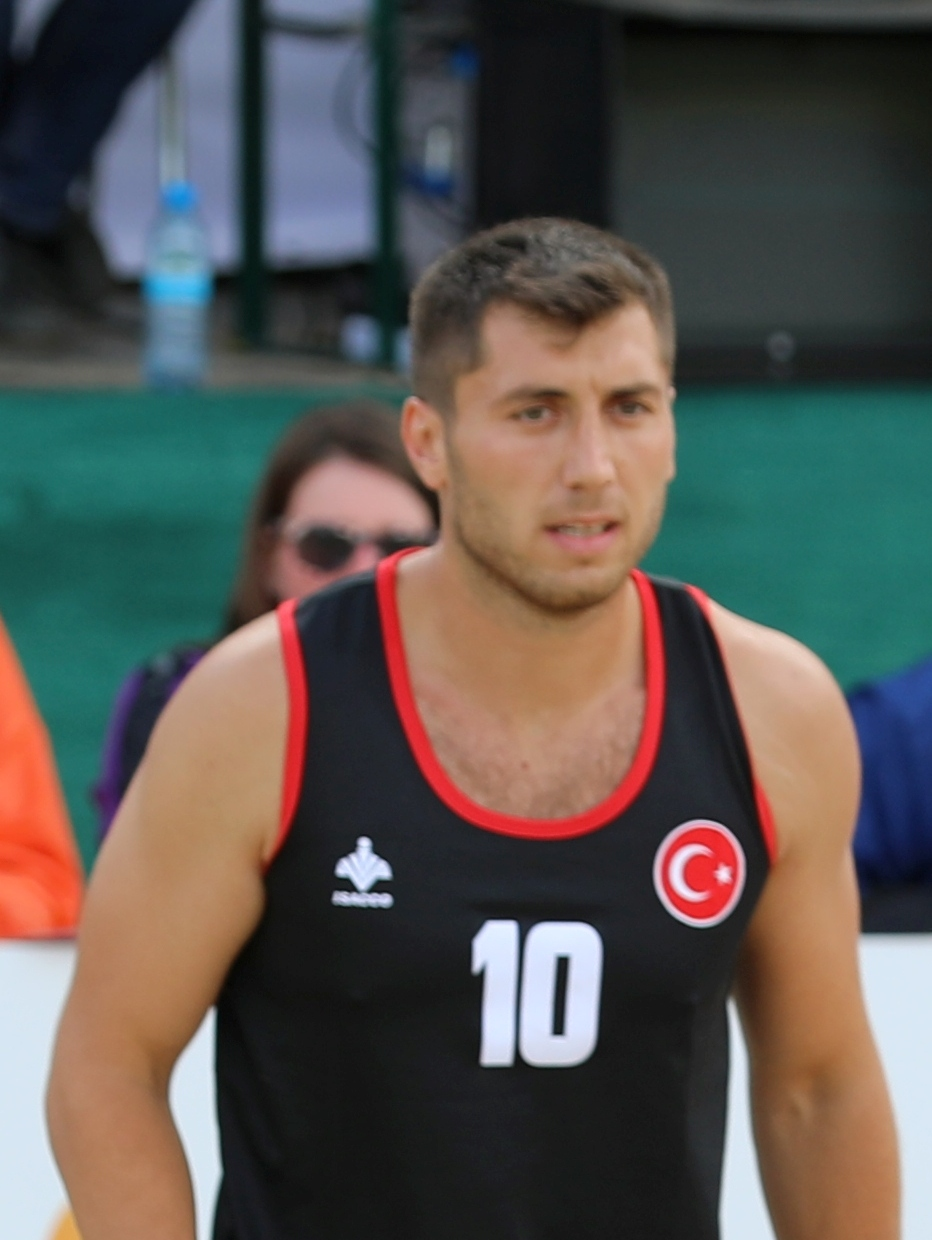
- Kütahya in 2019

Sport
- Sport: Handball
Medal record
Men's handball
Representing Turkey
Islamic Solidarity Games
Silver medal – second place	2021 Konya

Cemal Kütahya (6 December 1990 – 6 February 2023) was a Turkish handball player. He was captain of the Turkey national team.

== Death ==
Kütahya died alongside his five-year-old son, his pregnant wife and his mother-in-law in Antakya when the complex he lived in, Rönesans Rezidans, collapsed in the 2023 Turkey–Syria earthquake. He was 32.
