= Adıyaman Province =

Province of Turkey

Coordinates: 37°48′02″N 38°18′19″E

- Province
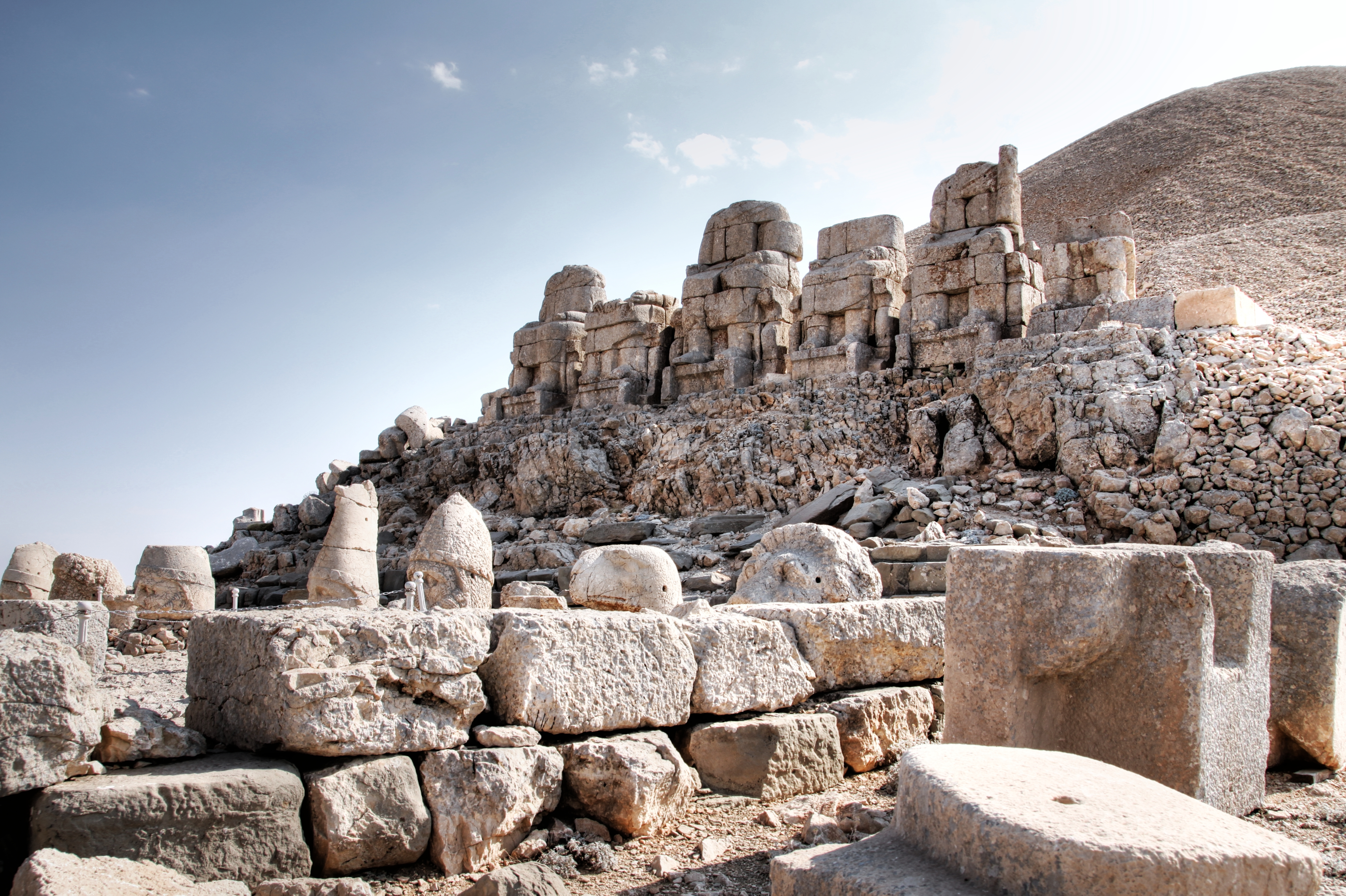
- Mount Nemrut

- Location of the province within Turkey
- Country: Turkey
- Seat: Adıyaman

Government
  - Governor: Abdullah Küçük
- Area: 7,337 km^{2} (2,833 sq mi)
- Population (2022): 635,169
  - Density: 86.57/km^{2} (224.2/sq mi)
- Time zone: UTC+3 (TRT)
- Area code: 0416
- Website: www.adiyaman.gov.tr

Adıyaman Province (Note: Turkish: Adıyaman ili, Kurdish: Parêzgeha Semsûr) is a province in the Southeastern Anatolia Region of Turkey. The capital is Adıyaman. Its area is 7,337 km^{2}, and its population is 635,169 (2022). The province is considered part of Turkish Kurdistan and has a Kurdish majority.

Adıyaman Province was part of the Malatya Province until 1954, when it was made into a province as a reward for voting for the winning Democratic Party in the 1954 general election.

== History ==
=== Early Armenian rule ===
Armenian existence in Adıyaman dates back to the 4th century, where they were known as 'fire worshippers'. Armenians lived in the area when Muslim Arabs captured the area in 639. The Arabs considered the city as part of Armenia and experienced immigration from Byzantine Armenia due to Byzantine oppression in 713. The city came under Seljuk rule after the Battle of Manzikert in 1071 and the local Armenians established principalities in the area. One of these principalities was founded by Philaretos Brachamios who tried to protect the land between the Seljuk and the Byzantine. After his death, the region came under control of various chieftains such as Kogh Vasil and Constantine of Gargar. The region around Gargar and the Mor Bar Sauma Monastery became a particular base of power for local chiefs of Syrian and Armenian origin.

The Armenians had good relations with the European Crusader states, but the Crusader County of Edessa would advance against the Armenians in Adıyaman. Political leaders in Adıyaman were also victims of assassinations by Edessa. The wife of Kogh Vasil founded an army to protect the area from Edessa as well, but Edessa ultimately captured the area. Close relations between the Armenians and the Crusader states, however, continued until Nur ad-Din captured the area in 1150. The area came under the rule of Timurtash of the Artuqids for his support for Nur ad-Din and later the Seljuks from the beginning of the 13th century. The locals failed at removing the rulership of Kilij Arslan II during the late 12th century. In the subsequent period, the area was fought over between the Mamluk Sultanate and the Armenian Kingdom of Cilicia, changing hands between the two until it finally came under permanent Mamluk control.

=== Ottoman rule ===
Ottoman Sultan Selim I captured the area during the Ottoman–Mamluk War in 1516–1517. In the first defter of the area in 1519, it was mentioned that the Kurdish Reşwan tribe populated the area. Documents from 1524 and 1536 also contain records of the Reşwan tribe living in the area. The tribe was engaged in agriculture after having had a nomadic lifestyle.

Evliya Çelebi visited the city in the 17th century and described the agricultural life.

At the beginning of the 19th century, most Armenians lived near the castle of Adıyaman city and mostly made their living through shop keeping and trading. In the villages, they were involved in agriculture and animal husbandry. The local Armenians welcomed American missionaries approaching them during the 19th century at first, but prevented them from converted them later on. Some of the Gregorian Armenians did however convert to Protestantism and the missionaries ultimately divided the local Armenian community. Ainsworth visited the town of Adıyaman in the 1842 and mentioned that the town contained 800 Muslim households and 300 Armenian households and that it had several mosques but no churches. After his visit to the town, he visited the Kurdish village of Kerkunah in the outskirts and afterwards Kâhta, where he mentioned that a Kurdish rebellion was taking place. Most of the rural areas spoke Kurdish in 1882, while Turkish was prevalent in Adıyaman town.

Armenian nationalism increased among the Armenians by the end of the century and most of the Armenian population fell victim to the Armenian genocide in 1915. There are, however, still some Armenians around Kâhta.

The area was part of Mamuret-ul-Aziz Vilayet as Behisni, Hasanmansur and Kahta districts. These three districts had a total population of 99,439 in 1914 of which 93.4% was Muslim and 6.6% Christian.

=== Republican era ===
The names of 224 villages in Adiyaman Province was Turkified as part of the campaign to remove any mention of Kurdishness in the country. In 1932, the whole region was chiefly populated by Kurds. The province had a population of 208,755 in 1955 of which 99.8% adhered to Islam and 0.2% to Christianity. In 1960, the province had a population of 233,717 of which 99.7% was Muslim and 0.3% Christian. In 1965, the population increased to 267,277 of which 99.8% was Muslim and 0.2% Christian. The Turkish authorities put the province under State of emergency (OHAL) in the early 1990s as part of the Kurdish–Turkish conflict.

In 2023, 7.8 and 7.5 magnitude earthquakes in Kahramanmaraş also affected Adıyaman.

== Geography ==
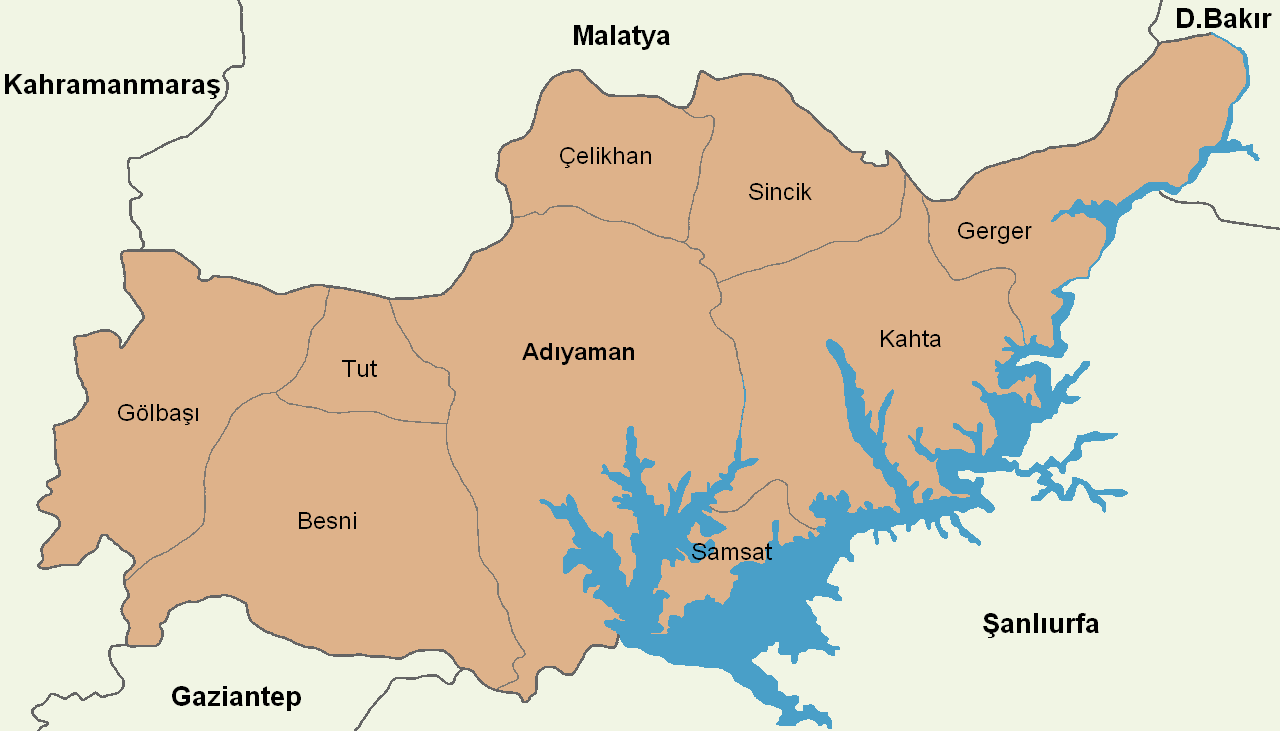

The province consists of the districts Adıyaman (center district), Besni, Çelikhan, Gerger, Gölbaşı, Kâhta, Samsat, Sincik and Tut.

== Demographics ==
Population
Year	Pop.	±% p.a.
1914	99,439	—
1923	77,819	−2.69%
1935	126,460	+4.13%
1950	181,670	+2.44%
1960	233,717	+2.55%
1970	303,511	+2.65%
1980	367,595	+1.93%
1990	513,131	+3.39%
2000	623,811	+1.97%
2010	590,935	−0.54%
2020	632,459	+0.68%
2022	635,169	+0.21%
Source: Population censuses (1914-2000) and TÜIK (2010-2022)

Out of the 339 villages in the province, 296 are populated by Kurds while the remaining 43 are populated by Turks. In terms of religious affiliation, 293 of the villages have an Hanafi population, 80 villages with an Alevi population and two villages are reported to having a Shafi'i population.

The majority of the population is Hanafi Kurdish, with a significant Kurdish Alevi population. One estimate from 2014 places the Alevi population at 11%. The province is generally more pious than other Kurdish areas in Turkey and has been a hotspot for radicalization and Islamism in recent years (see Dokumacılar). Historian Şahidin Şimşek argued that Hanafi adherents in the province had been manipulated by the state to believe that Kurdish nationalism equated to Alevism. Another theory points at the poverty in the province.

The Kurdish tribes in the province include the Alikan, Atman, Balyan, Belikan tribe, Bêzikan, Birîmşa, Bîstikan, Canbegan, Celikan, Dêrsimî, Dirêjan, Gewozî, Hevêdan, Heyderan, Hûriyan, Izol, Kawan, Kerdizan, Kîkan, Kirvar, Mirdesan, Molikan, Mukriyan, Pîrvan, Reşwan, Şavak, Sinemilli, Sînanka, Şêxbizin and the Teşikan tribe.

The Alevis of the western districts of Besni, Gölbaşı and Tut are Turkmen and Kurdish.
