= Lütfü Savaş =

Turkish politician

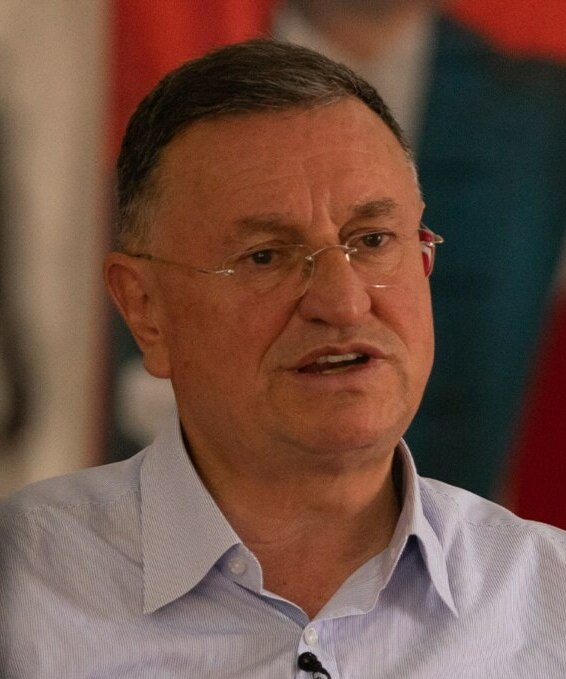
- Savaş in 2020

Mayor of Hatay
- In office 30 March 2014 – 6 April 2024
- Preceded by: New position
- Succeeded by: Mehmet Öntürk

Mayor of Antakya
- In office 29 March 2009 – 30 March 2014
- Preceded by: Mehmet Yeloğlu
- Succeeded by: İsmail Kimyeci

Personal details
- Born: 23 March 1965 (age 60) Dağdüzü, Yayladağı, Hatay, Turkey
- Party: Justice and Development Party (2009-2014); Republican People's Party (2014-2024)
- Spouse: Naziye Savaş
- Children: 2
- Education: Anadolu University
- Occupation: politician, doctor
- Website: www.lutfusavas.com.tr

Lütfü Savaş (born 23 March 1965, Yayladağı) is a Turkish politician, doctor and former mayor of Hatay Province of Turkey.

== Early life and education ==
Savaş was born in the Dağdüzü village in the Yayladağı district of the province of Hatay. He is of Turkmen origin and has Syrian Turkmen relatives in Syria. He grew up in Antakya's Havuzlar neighborhood. In 1990, he graduated from the Medical School of Anadolu University in Eskişehir.

== Career ==
He took part in the establishment of Mustafa Kemal University's Medical School. He became an associate professor in 2007. Between 2006 and 2008, he was the advisor of the rector of Mustafa Kemal University.
