= 2023–24 in Turkish football =

2023–24 Turkish football season

Football in Turkey
- Season: 2023–24

Men's football
- Süper Lig: Galatasaray
- First League: Eyüpspor
- Turkish Cup: Beşiktaş
- Turkish Super Cup: Galatasaray

Women's football
- Women's Super League: Galatasaray

The 2023–24 season was the 119th season of competitive football in Turkey.

== Pre-season ==
League	Promoted to league	Relegated from league
Süper Lig	Samsunspor; Çaykur Rizespor; Pendikspor	Giresunspor; Ümraniyespor
1. Lig	Çorum; Kocaelispor; Şanlıurfaspor	Altınordu; Denizlispor
2. Lig	68 Aksaray Belediyespor; Iğdır; Yeni Mersin İdmanyurdu; Belediye Derincespor; Karaman; Beyoğlu Yeni Çarşı	
3. Lig	Mardin 1969; Kahramanmaraş İstiklalspor; Sebat Gençlikspor; Tokat Belediye Plevnespor; Karabük İdman Yurdu; Talasgücü Belediyespor; Adana 1954; Anadolu Üniversitesi; Bornova; Aliağa; Küçükçekmece Sinopspor; Sultanbeyli Belediyespor; Silivrispor; İnegöl Kafkas Gençlikspor; Silifke Belediyespor	

== Men's ==
=== League tables ===
==== Süper Lig ====
Pos	Team	Pld	W	D	L	GF	GA	GD	Pts	Qualification or relegation
1	Galatasaray (C)	38	33	3	2	92	26	+66	102	Qualification for the Champions League play-off round
2	Fenerbahçe	38	31	6	1	99	31	+68	99	Qualification for the Champions League second qualifying round
3	Trabzonspor	38	21	4	13	69	50	+19	67	Qualification for the Europa League second qualifying round
4	Başakşehir	38	18	7	13	57	43	+14	61	Qualification for the Conference League second qualifying round
5	Kasımpaşa	38	16	8	14	62	65	−3	56 (Note: Kasımpaşa are ahead of Beşiktaş on head-to-head points: Kasımpaşa 2–1 Beşiktaş, Beşiktaş 1–3 Kasımpaşa.)	
6	Beşiktaş	38	16	8	14	52	47	+5	56	Qualification for the Europa League play-off round (Note: The 2023–24 Turkish Cup winners (Beşiktaş) qualify for the Europa League play-off round.)
7	Sivasspor	38	14	12	12	47	54	−7	54	
8	Alanyaspor	38	12	16	10	53	50	+3	52	
9	Rizespor	38	14	8	16	48	58	−10	50	
10	Antalyaspor	38	12	13	13	44	49	−5	49	
11	Gaziantep	38	12	8	18	50	57	−7	44 (Note: Gaziantep are ahead of Adana Demirspor on head-to-head points: Gaziantep 2–2 Adana Demirspor, Adana Demirspor 1–6 Gaziantep.)	
12	Adana Demirspor	38	10	14	14	54	61	−7	44	
13	Samsunspor	38	11	10	17	42	52	−10	43	
14	Kayserispor (Note: 3 points deducted)	38	11	12	15	44	57	−13	42	
15	Hatayspor	38	9	14	15	45	52	−7	41 (Note: Hatayspor are ahead of Konyaspor on overall goal difference.)	
16	Konyaspor	38	9	14	15	40	53	−13	41	
17	Ankaragücü (R)	38	8	16	14	46	52	−6	40 (Note: Ankaragücü are ahead of Fatih Karagümrük on head-to-head points: Fatih Karagümrük 1–1 Ankaragücü, Ankaragücü 2–0 Fatih Karagümrük.)	Relegation to TFF First League
18	Fatih Karagümrük (R)	38	10	10	18	49	52	−3	40	Relegation to TFF First League
19	Pendikspor (R)	38	9	10	19	42	73	−31	37	Relegation to TFF First League
20	İstanbulspor (Note: 3 points deducted) (R)	38	4	7	27	27	80	−53	16	Relegation to TFF First League

Source: Süper Lig
Rules for classification: 1) Points; 2) Head-to-head points; 3) Head-to-head goal difference; 4) Head-to-head goals scored; 5) Goal difference; 6) Goals scored; 7) Play-off.
(C) Champions; (R) Relegated

==== 1. Lig ====
Pos	Team	Pld	W	D	L	GF	GA	GD	Pts	Qualification or relegation
1	Eyüpspor (P)	34	24	3	7	77	31	+46	75	Promotion to the Süper Lig
2	Göztepe (P)	34	21	7	6	60	20	+40	70	Promotion to the Süper Lig
3	Sakaryaspor	34	17	9	8	50	35	+15	60	Qualification for the Süper Lig Playoff Final
4	Bodrum (O, P)	34	15	12	7	43	22	+21	57	Qualification for the Süper Lig Playoff Quarter Finals
5	Çorum	34	16	8	10	55	36	+19	56	Qualification for the Süper Lig Playoff Quarter Finals
6	Kocaelispor	34	16	7	11	48	41	+7	55	Qualification for the Süper Lig Playoff Quarter Finals
7	Boluspor	34	15	8	11	33	35	−2	53	Qualification for the Süper Lig Playoff Quarter Finals
8	Gençlerbirliği	34	13	12	9	39	33	+6	51	
9	Bandırmaspor	34	13	11	10	49	32	+17	50	
10	Erzurumspor (Note: Erzurumspor have been deducted 3 points.)	34	12	11	11	30	34	−4	44	
11	Ümraniyespor	34	12	7	15	40	47	−7	43	
12	Manisa	34	9	13	12	40	40	0	40 (Note: Ranked on goal difference: Manisa (0), Ankara Keçiörengücü (–9).)	
13	Keçiörengücü	34	10	10	14	34	43	−9	40	
14	Adanaspor	34	11	6	17	28	45	−17	39	
15	Şanlıurfaspor	34	9	11	14	32	37	−5	38 (Note: Ranked on goal difference: Şanlıurfaspor (–5), Tuzlaspor (–12).)	
16	Tuzlaspor (R)	34	9	11	14	35	47	−12	38	Relegation to the TFF Second League
17	Altay (Note: Altay have been deducted 3 points by the Club Licensing Board for failing to meet the licensing requirements. Later, another 6 points have been deducted.) (R)	34	5	4	25	16	76	−60	10	Relegation to the TFF Second League
18	Giresunspor (Note: Giresunspor have been deducted 3 points.) (R)	34	2	4	28	16	71	−55	7	Relegation to the TFF Second League
19	Yeni Malatyaspor (Note: Yeni Malatyaspor withdrew from the league following the 2023 Turkey–Syria earthquake and will not be relegated at the end of the season.)	0	0	0	0	0	0	0	0	Withdrew

Updated to match(es) played on 11 May 2024. Source: TFF
Rules for classification: 1) Points; 2) Head-to-head points; 3) Head-to-head goal difference; 4) Head-to-head goals scored; 5) Goal difference; 6) Goals scored
(O) Play-off winners; (P) Promoted; (R) Relegated

==== 2. Lig ====
===== White Group =====
Pos	Team	Pld	W	D	L	GF	GA	GD	Pts	Qualification or relegation
1	Esenler Erokspor (C, P)	36	26	5	5	83	29	+54	83	Promotion to the TFF First League
2	Vanspor (Note: Vanspor deducted 3 points)	36	24	6	6	63	37	+26	75	Qualification for the TFF First League Playoff Group Final
3	Bucaspor 1928	36	21	10	5	54	25	+29	73	Qualification for the TFF First League Playoff Quarter Finals
4	1461 Trabzon	36	21	9	6	71	39	+32	72	Qualification for the TFF First League Playoff Quarter Finals
5	Ankaraspor	36	15	13	8	45	35	+10	58 (Note: Ranked on head-to-head points and head-to-head difference: Ankaraspor 4, Yeni Mersin Idmanyurdu 1.)	Qualification for the TFF First League Playoff Quarter Finals
6	Yeni Mersin İdmanyurdu	36	16	10	10	50	36	+14	58	Qualification for the TFF First League Playoff Quarter Finals
7	Beyoğlu Yeni Çarşı	36	15	7	14	47	38	+9	52	
8	Karacabey Belediyespor	36	13	12	11	43	37	+6	51	
9	Ankara Demirspor	36	15	5	16	43	46	−3	50	
10	Diyarbekirspor	36	12	9	15	39	41	−2	45	
11	Kırklarelispor	36	11	11	14	33	41	−8	44	
12	Altınordu	36	10	13	13	45	39	+6	43	
13	Afjet Afyonspor	36	10	12	14	25	38	−13	42	
14	Serik Belediyespor	36	10	10	16	29	45	−16	40	
15	Nazilli Belediyespor (Note: Nazilli Belediyespor deducted 3 points)	36	11	9	16	38	57	−19	39	
16	Zonguldak Kömürspor (Note: Zonguldak Kömürspor deducted 3 points) (R)	36	11	8	17	41	57	−16	38	Relegation to the TFF Third League
17	Kırşehir Futbol SK (R)	36	5	8	23	38	76	−38	23	Relegation to the TFF Third League
18	Bursaspor (Note: Bursaspor deducted 3 points) (R)	36	6	8	22	28	64	−36	23	Relegation to the TFF Third League
19	Adıyaman (R)	36	4	7	25	28	63	−35	19	Relegation to the TFF Third League

Updated to match(es) played on 4 May 2024. Source: TFF
Rules for classification: 1) Points; 2) Head-to-head points; 3) Head-to-head goal difference; 4) Head-to-head goals scored; 5) Goal difference; 6) Goals scored
(C) Champions; (P) Promoted; (R) Relegated

===== Red Group =====
Pos	Team	Pld	W	D	L	GF	GA	GD	Pts	Qualification or relegation
1	Amed (C, P)	36	24	9	3	73	26	+47	81	Promotion to the TFF First League
2	Kastamonuspor 1966	36	23	9	4	63	26	+37	78	Qualification for the TFF First League Playoff Group Final
3	Iğdır (O, P)	36	21	11	4	70	27	+43	74	Qualification for the TFF First League Playoff Quarter Finals
4	24 Erzincanspor	36	19	9	8	56	33	+23	66	Qualification for the TFF First League Playoff Quarter Finals
5	Menemen	36	19	8	9	67	41	+26	65	Qualification for the TFF First League Playoff Quarter Finals
6	İskenderunspor	36	18	6	12	62	47	+15	60	Qualification for the TFF First League Playoff Quarter Finals
7	Isparta 32 SK	36	17	3	16	39	52	−13	54	
8	Somaspor	36	14	8	14	42	42	0	50	
9	İnegölspor	36	13	10	13	46	47	−1	49	
10	Fethiyespor	36	10	14	12	46	46	0	44	
11	Karaman FK	36	11	9	16	40	61	−21	42 (Note: Ranked on head-to-head points: Karaman FK 7, 68 Aksaray Belediyespor 5, Arnavutköy Belediyespor 4.)	
12	68 Aksaray Belediyespor	36	10	12	14	29	30	−1	42	
13	Arnavutköy Belediyespor	36	10	12	14	44	46	−2	42	
14	Sarıyer	36	10	11	15	46	46	0	41	
15	Belediye Derincespor	36	10	10	16	38	43	−5	40 (Note: Ranked on head-to-head points and head-to-head goal difference: Belediye Derincespor 3 (+1), Etimesgut Belediyespor 3 (-1).)	
16	Etimesgut Belediyespor (R)	36	11	7	18	25	38	−13	40	Relegation to the TFF Third League
17	Düzcespor (R)	36	9	10	17	42	63	−21	37	Relegation to the TFF Third League
18	Denizlispor (R)	36	8	8	20	37	57	−20	32	Relegation to the TFF Third League
19	Uşakspor (1984) (R)	36	1	2	33	14	108	−94	5	Relegation to the TFF Third League

Updated to match(es) played on 4 May 2024. Source: TFF
Rules for classification: 1) Points; 2) Head-to-head points; 3) Head-to-head goal difference; 4) Head-to-head goals scored; 5) Goal difference; 6) Goals scored
(C) Champions; (O) Play-off winners; (P) Promoted; (R) Relegated

== Women's ==
=== Women's Super League ===
Pos	Team	Pld	W	D	L	GF	GA	GD	Pts	Qualification or relegation
1	Galatasaray	30	23	2	5	71	29	+42	71	Qualification for the Champions League first round
2	Ankara BB FOMGET	30	22	3	5	78	21	+57	69	
3	Fenerbahçe	30	21	3	6	82	27	+55	66	
4	Beşiktaş	30	19	2	9	71	29	+42	59	
5	Beylerbeyi	30	17	6	7	68	25	+43	57	
6	ALG	30	17	4	9	51	36	+15	55	
7	Fatih Karagümrük	30	15	7	8	60	33	+27	52	
8	Hakkarigücü	30	13	4	13	51	58	−7	43	
9	Kdz. Ereğli Bld.	30	11	6	13	40	40	0	39	
10	Amed	30	9	8	13	42	54	−12	35	
11	Trabzonspor	30	9	6	15	34	44	−10	33	
12	Fatih Vatan	30	9	3	18	42	58	−16	30	
13	Gaziantep Asyaspor	30	7	5	18	52	75	−23	26	
14	Ataşehir Bld.	30	5	7	18	30	76	−46	22	Relegation to the Turkish Women's Football First League
15	1207 Antalyaspor	30	4	8	18	22	76	−54	20	Relegation to the Turkish Women's Football First League
16	Adana İdmanyurdu	30	1	2	27	11	124	−113	5	Relegation to the Turkish Women's Football First League

Source: TFF.org

== Cup competitions ==
=== Turkish Cup ===
23 May 2024
20:45 TRT (UTC+3)

Beşiktaş	3–2	Trabzonspor
Ghezzal 45+3' (pen.); Uçan 54'; Al-Musrati 90+4'	Report	Onuachu 13'; Pépé 89'

Atatürk Olympic Stadium, Istanbul
Referee: Ali Şansalan

=== Turkish Super Cup ===
7 April 2024
21:30 TRT (UTC+3)

Galatasaray	3–0	Fenerbahçe
Icardi 1'	Report

Şanlıurfa 11 Nisan Stadium, Şanlıurfa
Referee: Volkan Bayarslan

Win was awarded to Galatasaray as Fenerbahçe walked off the pitch in the 2nd minute, and sanctioned with a forfeit by TFF.

== National team ==
=== Friendlies ===
12 September 2023 Friendly	Japan	4–2	Turkey	Genk, Belgium
14:20 CEST (UTC+02:00)	A. Ito 15'; Nakamura 28', 36'; J. Ito 78'	Report	Kabak 44'; Yıldırım 61'	Stadium: Cegeka Arena; Attendance: 7,202; Referee: Allard Lindhout (Netherlands)

18 November 2023 Friendly	Germany	2–3	Turkey	Berlin, Germany
20:45 CET (UTC+01:00)	Havertz 5'; Füllkrug 48'	Report	Kadıoğlu 38'; Yıldız 45+2'; Sarı 70' (pen.)	Stadium: Olympiastadion; Attendance: 72,592; Referee: Bartosz Frankowski (Poland)

22 March 2024 Friendly	Hungary	1–0	Turkey	Budapest, Hungary
20:45 CET (UTC+01:00)	Szoboszlai 48' (pen.)	Report		Stadium: Puskas Arena; Attendance: 54,444; Referee: Bartosz Frankowski (Poland)

26 March 2024 Friendly	Austria	6–1	Turkey	Vienna, Austria
20:45 CET (UTC+01:00)	X. Schlager 2'; Gregoritsch 44', 48', 59' (pen.); Baumgartner 78' (pen.); Entrup 90+5'	Report	Çalhanoğlu 25' (pen.)	Stadium: Ernst Happel Stadium; Attendance: 38,500; Referee: Daniele Chiffi (Italy)

4 June 2024 Friendly	Italy	0–0	Turkey	Bologna, Italy
20:45 CEST (UTC+02:00)		Report		Stadium: Stadio Renato Dall'Ara; Attendance: 25,012; Referee: Sebastian Gishamer (Austria)

10 June 2024 Friendly	Poland	2–1	Turkey	Warsaw, Poland
20:30 CEST (UTC+02:00)	Świderski 12'; Zalewski 90'	Report	Yılmaz 77'	Stadium: Kazimierz Górski National Stadium; Attendance: 48,677; Referee: Balázs Berke (Hungary)

=== UEFA Euro 2024 qualification ===
Pos	Team	Pld	W	D	L	GF	GA	GD	Pts	Qualification	(Turkey)	(Croatia)	(Wales)	(Armenia)	(Latvia)
1	Turkey	8	5	2	1	14	7	+7	17	Qualify for final tournament	—	0–2	2–0	1–1	4–0
2	Croatia	8	5	1	2	13	4	+9	16	Qualify for final tournament	0–1	—	1–1	1–0	5–0
3	Wales	8	3	3	2	10	10	0	12	Advance to play-offs via Nations League	1–1	2–1	—	2–4	1–0
4	Armenia	8	2	2	4	9	11	−2	8		1–2	0–1	1–1	—	2–1
5	Latvia	8	1	0	7	5	19	−14	3		2–3	0–2	0–2	2–0	—

Source: UEFA
Rules for classification: Qualification tiebreakers

8 September 2023 UEFA Euro 2024 qualifying	Turkey	1–1	Armenia	Eskişehir, Turkey
21:45 TRT (UTC+03:00)	Yıldırım 88'	Report	Dashyan 49'	Stadium: New Eskişehir Stadium; Attendance: 31,740; Referee: Daniele Orsato (Italy)

12 October 2023 UEFA Euro 2024 qualifying	Croatia	0–1	Turkey	Osijek, Croatia
20:45 CEST (UTC+02:00)		Report	Yılmaz 30'	Stadium: Opus Arena; Attendance: 12,812; Referee: Anthony Taylor (England)

15 October 2023 UEFA Euro 2024 qualifying	Turkey	4–0	Latvia	Konya, Turkey
21:45 TRT (UTC+03:00)	Akgün 58'; Tosun 83', 90+2'; Aktürkoğlu 87'	Report		Stadium: Konya Metropolitan Municipality Stadium; Attendance: 35,925; Referee: Enea Jorgji (Albania)

21 November 2023 UEFA Euro 2024 qualifying	Wales	1–1	Turkey	Cardiff, Wales
19:45 GMT (UTC+00:00)	N. Williams 7'	Report	Yazıcı 70' (pen.)	Stadium: Cardiff City Stadium; Attendance: 32,291; Referee: Matej Jug (Slovenia)

=== UEFA Euro 2024 ===
==== Group B ====
Pos	Team	Pld	W	D	L	GF	GA	GD	Pts	Qualification	POR	TUR	GEO	CZE
1	Portugal	3	2	0	1	5	3	+2	6 (Note: Head-to-head result: Turkey 0–3 Portugal.)	Advance to knockout stage	—			
2	Turkey	3	2	0	1	5	5	0	6	Advance to knockout stage		—		
3	Georgia	3	1	1	1	4	4	0	4	Advance to knockout stage			—	
4	Czech Republic	3	0	1	2	3	5	−2	1					—

Source: UEFA
Rules for classification: Group stage tiebreakers
Notes:

18 June 2024 Group F	Turkey	3–1	Georgia	Dortmund, Germany
18:00 CEST (UTC+02:00)	Müldür 25'; Güler 65'; Aktürkoğlu 90+7'	Report	Mikautadze 32'	Stadium: Westfalenstadion; Attendance: 59,127; Referee: Facundo Tello (Argentina)

22 June 2024 Group F	Turkey	0–3	Portugal	Dortmund, Germany
18:00 CEST (UTC+02:00)		Report	B. Silva 21'; Akaydin 28' (o.g.); Fernandes 56'	Stadium: Westfalenstadion; Attendance: 61,047; Referee: Felix Zwayer (Germany)

26 June 2024 Group F	Czech Republic	1–2	Turkey	Hamburg, Germany
21:00 CEST (UTC+02:00)	Souček 66'	Report	Çalhanoğlu 51'; Tosun 90+4'	Stadium: Volksparkstadion; Attendance: 47,683; Referee: István Kovács (Romania)

===== Knockout stage =====
2 July 2024 Round of 16	Austria	1–2	Turkey	Leipzig, Germany
21:00	Gregoritsch 66'	Report	Demiral 1', 59'	Stadium: Red Bull Arena; Attendance: 38,305; Referee: Artur Soares Dias (Portugal)

6 July 2024 Quarter-finals	Netherlands	2–1	Turkey	Berlin, Germany
21:00 CEST	De Vrij 70'; Müldür 76' (o.g.)	Report	Akaydin 35'	Stadium: Olympiastadion; Attendance: 70,091; Referee: Clément Turpin (France)

=== 2024–25 UEFA Nations League ===
Pos	Team	Pld	W	D	L	GF	GA	GD	Pts	Promotion, qualification or relegation	(Wales)	(Turkey)	(Iceland)	(Montenegro)
1	Wales (P)	6	3	3	0	9	4	+5	12	Promotion to League A	—	0–0	4–1	1–0
2	Turkey (O, P)	6	3	2	1	9	6	+3	11	Qualification for promotion play-offs	0–0	—	3–1	1–0
3	Iceland (R)	6	2	1	3	10	13	−3	7	Qualification for relegation play-offs	2–2	2–4	—	2–0
4	Montenegro (R)	6	1	0	5	4	9	−5	3	Relegation to League C	1–2	3–1	0–2	—

Source: UEFA
Rules for classification: Tiebreakers
(O) Play-off winners; (P) Promoted; (R) Relegated

6 September 2024 2024–25 UEFA Nations League B	Wales	0–0	Turkey	Cardiff, Wales
18:45 UTC+0		Report		Stadium: Cardiff City Stadium; Attendance: 28,625; Referee: Rohit Saggi (Norway)

9 September 2024 2024–25 UEFA Nations League B	Turkey	3–1	Iceland	İzmir, Turkey
21:45 UTC+3	Aktürkoğlu 2', 52', 88'	Report	Pálsson 37'	Stadium: Gürsel Aksel Stadium; Attendance: 16,167; Referee: Enea Jorgji (Albania)

11 October 2024 2024–25 UEFA Nations League B	Turkey	1–0	Montenegro	Samsun, Turkey
21:45 UTC+3	Kahveci 69'	Report		Stadium: Samsun 19 Mayıs Stadium; Attendance: 28,829; Referee: Daniele Chiffi (Italy)

14 October 2024 2024–25 UEFA Nations League B	Iceland	2–4	Turkey	Reykjavík, Iceland
18:45 UTC+0	Óskarsson 3'; A. Guðjohnsen 83'	Report	Kahveci 62'; Çalhanoğlu 67' (pen.); Güler 88'; Aktürkoğlu 90+5'	Stadium: Laugardalsvöllur; Attendance: 5,260; Referee: Damian Sylwestrzak (Poland)

16 November 2024 2024–25 UEFA Nations League B	Turkey	0–0	Wales	Kayseri, Turkey
20:00 UTC+3		Report		Stadium: Kadir Has Stadium; Attendance: 28,812; Referee: Juan Martínez Munuera (Spain)

19 November 2024 2024–25 UEFA Nations League B	Montenegro	3–1	Turkey	Podgorica, Montenegro
20:45 UTC+1	Krstović 29', 45', 73'	Report	Yıldız 37'	Stadium: Podgorica City Stadium; Attendance: 2,579; Referee: Urs Schnyder (Switzerland)

== Turkish clubs in Europe ==
=== UEFA Champions League ===
==== Second qualifying round ====
Team 1	Agg.	Team 2	1st leg	2nd leg
Žalgiris (Lithuania)	2–3	(Turkey) Galatasaray	2–2	0–1

==== Third qualifying round ====
Team 1	Agg.	Team 2	1st leg	2nd leg
Olimpija Ljubljana (Slovenia)	0–4	(Turkey) Galatasaray	0–3	0–1

==== Play-off round ====
Team 1	Agg.	Team 2	1st leg	2nd leg
Molde (Norway)	3–5	(Turkey) Galatasaray	2–3	1–2

==== Group stage ====
===== Group A =====
Pos	Team	Pld	W	D	L	GF	GA	GD	Pts	Qualification	BAY	CPH	GAL	MUN
1	(Germany) Bayern Munich	6	5	1	0	12	6	+6	16	Advance to knockout phase	—	0–0	2–1	4–3
2	(Denmark) Copenhagen	6	2	2	2	8	8	0	8	Advance to knockout phase	1–2	—	1–0	4–3
3	(Turkey) Galatasaray	6	1	2	3	10	13	−3	5	Transfer to Europa League	1–3	2–2	—	3–3
4	(England) Manchester United	6	1	1	4	12	15	−3	4		0–1	1–0	2–3	—

Source: UEFA

=== UEFA Europa League ===
==== Knockout stage ====
===== Knockout round play-offs =====
Team 1	Agg.	Team 2	1st leg	2nd leg
Galatasaray (Turkey)	4–6	(Czech Republic) Sparta Prague	3–2	1–4

=== UEFA Europa Conference League ===
==== Second qualifying round ====
Team 1	Agg.	Team 2	1st leg	2nd leg
Fenerbahçe (Turkey)	9–0	(Moldova) Zimbru Chișinău	5–0	4–0
Beşiktaş (Turkey)	5–1	(Albania) Tirana	3–1	2–0
CFR Cluj (Romania)	2–3	(Turkey) Adana Demirspor	1–1	1–2

==== Third qualifying round ====
Team 1	Agg.	Team 2	1st leg	2nd leg
Neftçi (Azerbaijan)	2–5	(Turkey) Beşiktaş	1–3	1–2
Adana Demirspor (Turkey)	7–4	(Croatia) Osijek	5–1	2–3
Fenerbahçe (Turkey)	6–1	(Slovenia) Maribor	3–1	3–0

==== Play-off round ====
Team 1	Agg.	Team 2	1st leg	2nd leg
Genk (Belgium)	2–2 (5–4 p)	(Turkey) Adana Demirspor	2–1	0–1 (a.e.t.)
Fenerbahçe (Turkey)	6–1	(Netherlands) Twente	5–1	1–0
Dynamo Kyiv (Ukraine)	2–4	(Turkey) Beşiktaş	2–3	0–1

==== Group stage ====
===== Group D =====
Pos	Team	Pld	W	D	L	GF	GA	GD	Pts	Qualification	BRU	BOD	BEŞ	LUG
1	(Belgium) Club Brugge	6	5	1	0	15	3	+12	16	Advance to round of 16	—	3–1	1–1	2–0
2	(Norway) Bodø/Glimt	6	3	1	2	11	8	+3	10	Advance to knockout round play-offs	0–1	—	3–1	5–2
3	(Turkey) Beşiktaş	6	1	1	4	7	14	−7	4 (Note: Ranked on head-to-head goal difference: Beşiktaş +1, Lugano –1.)		0–5	1–2	—	2–3
4	(Switzerland) Lugano	6	1	1	4	6	14	−8	4		1–3	0–0	0–2	—

Source: UEFA

===== Group H =====
Pos	Team	Pld	W	D	L	GF	GA	GD	Pts	Qualification	FEN	LUD	NOR	TRN
1	(Turkey) Fenerbahçe	6	4	0	2	13	11	+2	12 (Note: Tied on head-to-head results. Overall goal difference used as a tiebreaker.)	Advance to round of 16	—	3–1	3–1	4–0
2	(Bulgaria) Ludogorets Razgrad	6	4	0	2	11	11	0	12	Advance to knockout round play-offs	2–0	—	1–0	4–0
3	(Denmark) Nordsjælland	6	3	1	2	17	7	+10	10		6–1	7–1	—	1–1
4	(Slovakia) Spartak Trnava	6	0	1	5	3	15	−12	1		1–2	1–2	0–2	—

Source: UEFA

==== Knockout stage ====
===== Round of 16 =====
Team 1	Agg.	Team 2	1st leg	2nd leg
Union Saint-Gilloise (Belgium)	1–3	(Turkey) Fenerbahçe	0–3	0–1

===== Quarter-finals =====
Team 1	Agg.	Team 2	1st leg	2nd leg
Olympiacos (Greece)	3-3 (3-2 p)	(Turkey) Fenerbahçe	3–2	0–1 (a.e.t.)
