= 2022–23 in Turkish football =

Football in Turkey
- Season: 2022–23

Men's football
- Süper Lig: Galatasaray
- First League: Samsunspor
- Turkish Cup: Fenerbahçe
- Turkish Super Cup: Trabzonspor

Women's football
- Women's Super League: Ankara BB Fomget

The 2022–23 season was the 118th season of competitive football in Turkey.

== Pre-season ==
League	Promoted to league
Süper Lig	Ankaragücü; Ümraniyespor; İstanbulspor
1.Lig	Bodrumspor; Pendikspor; Sakaryaspor
2.Lig	Arnavutköy Belediyespor; Batman Petrolspor; Düzcespor; Esenler Erokspor; Fethiyespor; İskenderun FK
3.Lig	Muş 1984 Muşspor; Eynesil Belediyespor; Arguvan Belediyespor; Kepez Belediyespor; Amasyaspor 1968; Sapanca Gençlikspor; Bulvarspor; Ayvalıkgücü Belediyespor; Efeler 09

== Men's ==
=== League tables ===
==== Süper Lig ====
Pos	Team	Pld	W	D	L	GF	GA	GD	Pts	Qualification or relegation
1	Galatasaray (C)	36	28	4	4	83	27	+56	88	Qualification for the Champions League second qualifying round
2	Fenerbahçe	36	25	5	6	87	42	+45	80	Qualification for the Europa Conference League second qualifying round
3	Beşiktaş	36	23	9	4	78	36	+42	78	Qualification for the Europa Conference League second qualifying round
4	Adana Demirspor	36	20	9	7	76	45	+31	69	Qualification for the Europa Conference League second qualifying round
5	İstanbul Başakşehir	36	18	8	10	54	37	+17	62	
6	Trabzonspor	36	17	6	13	64	54	+10	57	
7	Fatih Karagümrük	36	13	12	11	75	63	+12	51	
8	Konyaspor	36	12	15	9	49	41	+8	51	
9	Kayserispor	36	15	5	16	55	61	−6	47 (Note: Reduction of 3 points by decision of the Turkish Federation.)	
10	Kasımpaşa	36	12	7	17	45	61	−16	43	
11	Ankaragücü	36	12	6	18	43	53	−10	42	
12	İstanbulspor	36	12	5	19	47	63	−16	41 (Note: Head-to-head points: İstanbulspor 11, Antalyaspor 10, Sivasspor 8, Alanyaspor 4.)	
13	Antalyaspor	36	11	8	17	46	55	−9	41	
14	Sivasspor	36	11	8	17	46	54	−8	41	
15	Alanyaspor	36	11	8	17	54	70	−16	41	
16	Giresunspor (R)	36	10	10	16	42	60	−18	40	Relegation to TFF First League
17	Ümraniyespor (R)	36	7	9	20	47	64	−17	30	Relegation to TFF First League
18	Gaziantep (Note: On 12 February 2023, Gaziantep and Hatayspor withdrew from the league following the 2023 Turkey–Syria earthquake and were not relegated at the end of the season.)	36	6	7	23	31	72	−41	25	Withdrawn
19	Hatayspor	36	6	5	25	19	83	−64	23	Withdrawn

Source: Süper Lig
Rules for classification: 1) Points; 2) Head-to-head points; 3) Head-to-head goal difference; 4) Head-to-head goals scored; 5) Goal difference; 6) Goals scored; 7) Play-off.
(C) Champions; (R) Relegated

==== 1.Lig ====
Pos	Team	Pld	W	D	L	GF	GA	GD	Pts	Qualification or relegation
1	Samsunspor (C, P)	36	23	9	4	70	26	+44	78	Promotion to the Süper Lig
2	Çaykur Rizespor (P)	36	18	14	4	64	35	+29	68	Promotion to the Süper Lig
3	Pendikspor (O, P)	36	19	10	7	65	36	+29	67	Qualification for the Süper Lig Playoff Final
4	Bodrumspor	36	18	8	10	55	34	+21	62 (Note: Head-to-head points: Bodrumspor 5–0 Sakaryaspor, Sakaryaspor 2–1 Bodrumspor; Eyüpspor 2–1 Sakaryaspor, Sakaryaspor 2–0 Eyüpspor; Bodrumspor 3–0 Eyüpspor, Eyüpspor 1–0 Bodrumspor)	Qualification for the Süper Lig Playoff Quarter Finals
5	Sakaryaspor	36	20	2	14	59	47	+12	62	Qualification for the Süper Lig Playoff Quarter Finals
6	Eyüpspor	36	18	8	10	40	30	+10	62	Qualification for the Süper Lig Playoff Quarter Finals
7	Göztepe (Note: Göztepe vs. Altay was suspended following an attack on a goalkeeper in the 22nd minute. On 9 December 2022, TFF stated that both sides would be considered defeated 3−0. Also, Altay have been deducted 3 points by the Club Licensing Board for failing to meet the licensing requirements.)	36	17	9	10	45	31	+14	60	Qualification for the Süper Lig Playoff Quarter Finals
8	Manisa	36	15	11	10	53	47	+6	56 (Note: Head-to-head points: Manisa 0–0 Ankara Keçiörengücü, Ankara Keçiörengücü 0–3 Manisa)	
9	Ankara Keçiörengücü	36	16	8	12	59	47	+12	56	
10	Bandırmaspor	36	15	10	11	55	58	−3	55	
11	Boluspor	36	14	10	12	44	46	−2	52	
12	Altay (Note: Göztepe v. Altay was suspended following an attack on a goalkeeper in the 22nd minute. On 9 December 2022, TFF stated that both sides would be considered defeated 3−0.)	36	11	10	15	45	48	−3	40	
13	Erzurumspor (Note: Erzurumspor have been deducted 3 points by the Club Licensing Board for failing to meet the licensing requirements.)	36	11	9	16	43	48	−5	39	
14	Tuzlaspor	36	11	5	20	42	52	−10	38 (Note: Head-to-head points: Gençlerbirliği 1–2 Tuzlaspor, Tuzlaspor 1–0 Gençlerbirliği)	
15	Gençlerbirliği	36	10	8	18	46	55	−9	38	
16	Altınordu (R)	36	9	8	19	41	57	−16	35	Relegation to the TFF Second League
17	Adanaspor (Note: Adanaspor withdrew from the league following the 2023 Turkey–Syria earthquake and were not relegated at the end of the season.)	36	6	7	23	32	76	−44	25	Withdrew
18	Denizlispor (Note: Denizlispor have been deducted 3 points by the Club Licensing Board for failing to meet the licensing requirements.) (R)	36	7	5	24	35	67	−32	23	Relegation to the TFF Second League
19	Yeni Malatyaspor (Note: Yeni Malatyaspor have been deducted 3 points by the Club Licensing Board for failing to meet the licensing requirements. Yeni Malatyaspor withdrew from the league following the 2023 Turkey–Syria earthquake and were not relegated at the end of the season.)	36	4	7	25	22	81	−59	16	Withdrew

Source: TFF
Rules for classification: 1) Points; 2) Head-to-head points; 3) Head-to-head goal difference; 4) Head-to-head goals scored; 5) Goal difference; 6) Goals scored
(C) Champions; (O) Play-off winners; (P) Promoted; (R) Relegated

==== 2.Lig ====
===== White Group =====
Pos	Team	Pld	W	D	L	GF	GA	GD	Pts	Qualification or relegation
1	Çorum (C, P)	36	24	7	5	65	24	+41	79	Promotion to the TFF First League
2	Şanlıurfaspor (O, P)	36	22	9	5	75	25	+50	75	Qualification for the TFF First League Playoff Group Final
3	Esenler Erokspor	36	18	8	10	77	35	+42	62	Qualification for the TFF First League Playoff Quarter Finals
4	Amed	36	17	9	10	63	36	+27	60	Qualification for the TFF First League Playoff Quarter Finals
5	24 Erzincanspor	36	16	10	10	50	34	+16	58 (Note: Head to head points: 24 Erzincanspor 4 points, Ankaraspor 1 point)	Qualification for the TFF First League Playoff Quarter Finals
6	Ankaraspor	36	16	10	10	58	42	+16	58	Qualification for the TFF First League Playoff Quarter Finals
7	Somaspor (Note: Somaspor have been deducted 3 points by the Club Licensing Board for failing to meet the licensing requirements.)	36	17	9	10	54	35	+19	57	
8	Düzcespor	36	14	10	12	55	46	+9	52	
9	Menemen	36	15	9	12	57	44	+13	51	
10	Afjet Afyonspor	36	12	11	13	48	47	+1	47 (Note: Head to head points: Afyonspor 3 points, +1 goal difference, İnegölspor 3 points, -1 goal difference)	
11	İnegölspor	36	14	5	17	40	53	−13	47	
12	Isparta 32	36	12	10	14	43	42	+1	46 (Note: Head to head points: Isparta 32 10 points, +5 goal difference, Arnavutköy Belediyespor 10 points, +1 goal difference, Bursaspor 8 points, Nazilli Belediyespor 5 points)	
13	Arnavutköy Belediyespor	36	12	10	14	41	42	−1	46	
14	Bursaspor	36	12	10	14	51	57	−6	46	
15	Nazilli Belediyespor	36	12	10	14	48	48	0	46	
16	Batman Petrolspor (R)	36	12	9	15	40	44	−4	45	Relegation to the TFF Third League
17	Tarsus İdman Yurdu (R)	36	3	12	21	26	125	−99	21	Relegation to the TFF Third League
18	Bayburt Özel İdarespor (R)	36	5	7	24	25	68	−43	19	Relegation to the TFF Third League
19	Sivas Belediyespor (R)	36	2	9	25	27	96	−69	15	Relegation to the TFF Third League

Source: TFF
Rules for classification: 1) Points; 2) Head-to-head points; 3) Head-to-head goal difference; 4) Head-to-head goals scored; 5) Goal difference; 6) Goals scored
(C) Champions; (O) Play-off winners; (P) Promoted; (R) Relegated

===== Red Group =====
Pos	Team	Pld	W	D	L	GF	GA	GD	Pts	Qualification or relegation
1	Kocaelispor (C, P)	38	25	9	4	73	28	+45	84	Promotion to the TFF First League
2	Bucaspor 1928	38	24	9	5	63	22	+41	81	Qualification for the TFF First League Playoff Group Final
3	İskenderunspor	38	23	8	7	65	31	+34	77	Qualification for the TFF First League Playoff Quarter Finals
4	1461 Trabzon	38	22	8	8	62	27	+35	74 (Note: Head to head points: 1461 Trabzon 2 points, 0 goal difference; Vanspor 2 points, 0 goal difference)	Qualification for the TFF First League Playoff Quarter Finals
5	Vanspor	38	21	11	6	58	27	+31	74	Qualification for the TFF First League Playoff Quarter Finals
6	Ankara Demirspor	38	20	11	7	65	32	+33	71	Qualification for the TFF First League Playoff Quarter Finals
7	Karacabey Belediyespor	38	19	11	8	55	31	+24	68	
8	Fethiyespor	38	16	7	15	59	51	+8	55	
9	Zonguldak Kömürspor	38	15	8	15	45	50	−5	53	
10	Serik Belediyespor (Note: Balıkesir have been deducted 3 points by the Club Licensing Board for failing to meet the licensing requirements.)	38	14	11	13	54	43	+11	50	
11	Kırşehir	38	12	12	14	49	54	−5	48	
12	Kırklarelispor	38	10	16	12	38	35	+3	46	
13	Etimesgut Belediyespor	38	11	12	15	43	51	−8	45	
14	Kastamonuspor 1966	38	11	10	17	41	47	−6	43	
15	Sarıyer	38	10	12	16	46	57	−11	42	
16	Uşakspor	38	8	9	21	37	64	−27	33	
17	Balıkesirspor (R)	38	6	10	22	32	76	−44	25	Relegation to the TFF Third League
18	Adıyaman (Note: Adıyaman and Diyarbekirspor withdrew from the league following the 2023 Turkey–Syria earthquake and were not relegated at the end of the season.)	37	5	8	24	22	70	−48	23 (Note: Head to head points: Adıyaman 3 points, +1 goal difference; Pazarspor 3 puan, -1 goal difference)	Withdrawn
19	Pazarspor (R)	38	4	11	23	29	79	−50	23	Relegation to the TFF Third League
20	Diyarbekirspor	37	2	9	26	18	79	−61	15	Withdrawn

Source: TFF
Rules for classification: 1) Points; 2) Head-to-head points; 3) Head-to-head goal difference; 4) Head-to-head goals scored; 5) Goal difference; 6) Goals scored
(C) Champions; (P) Promoted; (R) Relegated

== Women's ==
=== Women's Super League ===
==== Group A ====
Pos	Team	Pld	W	D	L	GF	GA	GD	Pts	Qualification or relegation	ALG	FKA	FVA	BJK	KDZ	HAT	HAK	DUD	ALT
1	ALG	16	13	2	1	49	12	+37	41	Quarterfinals	—	2–1	3–0	2–1	2–0	3–3	0–0	3–0	3–0
2	Fatih Karagümrük	16	10	3	3	40	10	+30	33	First round	2–3	—	2–1	1–1	2–0	3–0	6–0	2–1	9–0
3	Fatih Vatan	16	7	4	5	22	18	+4	25	First round	1–2	0–4	—	1–0	0–0	2–1	1–1	4–1	3–0
4	Beşiktaş	16	6	6	4	33	18	+15	24	First round	1–3	0–1	4–2	—	3–0	3–1	2–2	4–0	3–0
5	Kdz. Ereğli Bld.	16	7	3	6	20	18	+2	24	First round	0–4	1–1	0–1	1–1	—	4–1	0–1	1–0	3–0
6	Hatayspor (Note: Hatayspor withdrew from the league, following the 2023 Turkey–Syria earthquake, and were not relegated at the end of the season.)	16	7	3	6	24	24	0	24	First round	3–2	1–0	0–0	1–1	0–3	—	1–0	2–0	3–1
7	Hakkarigücü	16	5	7	4	18	18	0	22	First round	0–3	0–0	0–0	2–2	1–2	1–0	—	3–0	3–0
8	Dudullu (Note: Dudullu had 3 points deducted.) (R)	16	2	2	12	10	36	−26	5	Play-out	0–4	0–3	0–3	1–1	0–1	1–4	1–1	—	3–0
9	Altay (Note: Altay had 3 points deducted. Withdrawn from league due to financial issues after season of first half.)	16	0	0	16	2	64	−62	−3	Withdrawn	0–10	0–3	0–3	0–6	1–4	0–3	0–3	0–2	—

Source: TFF.org
(R) Relegated

==== Group B ====
Pos	Team	Pld	W	D	L	GF	GA	GD	Pts	Qualification or relegation	GAL	FOM	FEN	AMD	ANT	ATA	KON	TRA	ADA	KIR
1	Galatasaray	18	17	0	1	84	9	+75	51	Quarterfinals	—	4–0	2–0	4–2	5–0	5–0	5–0	1–0	3–0	13–1
2	Ankara BB FOMGET (C)	18	16	1	1	65	11	+54	49	First round	1–0	—	1–0	1–0	4–1	7–2	2–1	3–1	3–0	15–1
3	Fenerbahçe	18	11	3	4	66	10	+56	36	First round	2–3	1–1	—	4–0	5–0	7–0	8–0	1–0	1–0	18–0
4	Amed	18	8	4	6	31	22	+9	28	First round	0–3	0–1	1–0	—	0–1	3–3	1–1	2–1	3–0	3–0
5	1207 Antalyaspor	18	7	4	7	32	25	+7	25	First round	0–2	0–2	1–1	0–0	—	0–0	1–1	1–2	3–0	13–0
6	Ataşehir Bld.	18	6	3	9	35	51	−16	21	First round	0–9	0–2	0–6	1–2	0–3	—	1–0	2–0	2–2	5–2
7	Konak Bld.	18	6	2	10	32	39	−7	20	First round	1–3	0–7	0–3	0–1	2–0	3–1	—	3–2	4–0	12–0
8	Trabzonspor (O)	18	5	2	11	27	29	−2	17	Play-out	2–6	0–2	0–0	1–1	0–3	0–2	3–1	—	1–0	11–0
9	Adana İdmanyurdu (Note: Adana İdmanyurdu withdrew from the league, following the 2023 Turkey–Syria earthquake, and were not relegated at the end of the season.)	18	4	1	13	20	37	−17	13		0–3	0–2	0–4	0–3	0–1	0–3	1–0	1–0	—	2–1
10	Kireçburnu (Note: Kireçburnu had 3 points deducted.) (R)	18	0	0	18	8	167	−159	−3	Play-out	0–13	0–11	1–5	1–9	1–4	0–13	0–3	0–3	0–14	—

Source: TFF.org
(C) Champions; (O) Play-out winner; (R) Relegated

==== Knockout stage ====
===== Play-out =====
Pos	Team	Pld	W	D	L	GF	GA	GD	Pts	Qualification or relegation	TRA	DUD	KIR
1	Trabzonspor (O)	4	3	0	1	10	1	+9	9	Super League	—	4–0	3–0
2	Dudullu (R)	4	3	0	1	7	4	+3	9	Relegation	1–0	—	3–0
3	Kireçburnu (R)	4	0	0	4	0	12	−12	0	Relegation	0–3	0–3	—

Source: TFF.org
(O) Play-out winner; (R) Relegated

===== Play-off =====
First round
A4	Beşiktaş	4	3	7
B5	1207 Antalyaspor	0	0	0
B2	Ankara BB FOMGET	1	5	6
A7	Hakkarigücü	2	0	2
A3	Fatih Vatan	6	5	11
B6	Ataşehir Bld.	0	0	0
B4	Amed (a.e.t.)	1	1	2
A5	Kdz. Ereğli Bld.	1	0	1
A2	Fatih Karagümrük	4	5	9
B7	Konak Bld.	0	0	0
B3	Fenerbahçe	3	3	6
A6	Hatayspor	0	0	0

Quarterfinals
A1	ALG	1	3	4
A4	Beşiktaş	1	0	1
B2	Ankara BB FOMGET	0	4	4
A3	Fatih Vatan	0	0	0
B1	Galatasaray	5	3	8
B4	Amed	1	0	1
A2	Fatih Karagümrük	0	1	1
B3	Fenerbahçe	1	1	2

Semifinals
A1	ALG	1	1	2
B2	Ankara BB FOMGET	3	0	3
B1	Galatasaray	0	2	2
B3	Fenerbahçe	2	2	4

Final
B2	Ankara BB FOMGET (a.e.t.)	4
B3	Fenerbahçe	2

== Cup competitions ==
=== Turkish Cup ===
==== Final ====
11 June 2023
20:45 TRT

Fenerbahçe	2–0	İstanbul Başakşehir
Batshuayi 1', 29'	Report

Gürsel Aksel Stadium, İzmir
Attendance: 12,182
Referee: Atilla Karaoğlan

=== Turkish Super Cup ===
30 July 2022
20:45 TRT

Trabzonspor	4–0	Sivasspor
Cornelius 37', 51'; Stryger Larsen 64'; Bakasetas 76' (pen.)	Report

Atatürk Olympic Stadium, Istanbul
Attendance: 46,732
Referee: Mete Kalkavan

== National team ==
=== Friendlies ===
16 November 2022 Friendly	Turkey	2–1	Scotland	Diyarbakır, Turkey
20:00 TRT (UTC+03:00)	Kabak 40'; Ünder 49'	Report	McGinn 62'	Stadium: Diyarbakır Stadium; Attendance: 30,788; Referee: Visar Kastrati (Kosovo)

19 November 2022 Friendly	Turkey	2–1	Czech Republic	Gaziantep, Turkey
20:00 TRT (UTC+03:00)	Ünal 31'; Çalhanoğlu 70'	Report	Černý 56'	Stadium: Gaziantep Stadium; Attendance: 29,017; Referee: Willie Collum (Scotland)

=== 2023–23 UEFA Nations League ===
Pos	Team	Pld	W	D	L	GF	GA	GD	Pts	Promotion or qualification	(Turkey)	(Luxembourg)	(Faroe Islands)	(Lithuania)
1	Turkey (P)	6	4	1	1	18	5	+13	13	Promotion to League B	—	3–3	4–0	2–0
2	Luxembourg	6	3	2	1	9	7	+2	11		0–2	—	2–2	1–0
3	Faroe Islands	6	2	2	2	7	10	−3	8		2–1	0–1	—	2–1
4	Lithuania (O)	6	0	1	5	2	14	−12	1	Qualification for relegation play-outs	0–6	0–2	1–1	—

Source: UEFA
Rules for classification: Tiebreakers
(O) Play-off winners; (P) Promoted

4 June 2022 2022–23 UEFA Nations League	Turkey	4–0	Faroe Islands	Istanbul, Turkey
21:45 TRT (UTC+03:00)	Ünder 37'; Dervişoğlu 47'; Dursun 82'; Demiral 85'	Report		Stadium: Başakşehir Fatih Terim Stadium; Attendance: 9,515; Referee: Trustin Farrugia Cann (Malta)

7 June 2022 2022–23 UEFA Nations League	Lithuania	0–6	Turkey	Vilnius, Lithuania
21:45 EEST (UTC+03:00)		Report	Sinik 2', 14'; Dursun 56' (pen.), 81'; Akgün 89'; Dervişoğlu 90+1'	Stadium: LFF Stadium; Attendance: 2,843; Referee: Novak Simović (Serbia)

11 June 2022 2022–23 UEFA Nations League	Luxembourg	0–2	Turkey	Luxembourg City, Luxembourg
20:45 CEST (UTC+02:00)		Report	Çalhanoğlu 37' (pen.); Dursun 76'	Stadium: Stade de Luxembourg; Attendance: 9,374; Referee: António Nobre (Portugal)

14 June 2022 2022–23 UEFA Nations League	Turkey	2–0	Lithuania	İzmir, Turkey
21:45 TRT (UTC+03:00)	Ayhan 37'; Çalhanoğlu 54' (pen.)	Report		Stadium: Gürsel Aksel Stadium; Attendance: 14,694; Referee: Stéphanie Frappart (France)

22 September 2022 2022–23 UEFA Nations League	Turkey	3–3	Luxembourg	Istanbul, Turkey
21:45 TRT (UTC+03:00)	Ünder 16' (pen.); Chanot 39' (o.g.); Yüksek 87'	Report	Da Graça 8'; Sinani 37'; Rodrigues 69'	Stadium: Başakşehir Fatih Terim Stadium; Attendance: 12,708; Referee: Tobias Stieler (Germany)

25 September 2022 2022–23 UEFA Nations League	Faroe Islands	2–1	Turkey	Tórshavn, Faroe Islands
19:45 WEST (UTC+01:00)	Davidsen 51'; Edmundsson 59'	Report	Gürler 89'	Stadium: Tórsvøllur; Attendance: 2,056; Referee: Serhiy Boyko (Ukraine)

=== UEFA Euro 2024 qualification ===
Pos	Team	Pld	W	D	L	GF	GA	GD	Pts	Qualification	(Turkey)	(Croatia)	(Wales)	(Armenia)	(Latvia)
1	Turkey	8	5	2	1	14	7	+7	17	Qualify for final tournament	—	0–2	2–0	1–1	4–0
2	Croatia	8	5	1	2	13	4	+9	16	Qualify for final tournament	0–1	—	1–1	1–0	5–0
3	Wales	8	3	3	2	10	10	0	12	Advance to play-offs via Nations League	1–1	2–1	—	2–4	1–0
4	Armenia	8	2	2	4	9	11	−2	8		1–2	0–1	1–1	—	2–1
5	Latvia	8	1	0	7	5	19	−14	3		2–3	0–2	0–2	2–0	—

Source: UEFA
Rules for classification: Qualification tiebreakers

25 March 2023 UEFA Euro 2024 qualifying	Armenia	1–2	Turkey	Yerevan, Armenia
21:00 AMT (UTC+04:00)	Kabak 10' (o.g.)	Report	Kökcü 35'; Aktürkoğlu 64'	Stadium: Vazgen Sargsyan Republican Stadium; Attendance: 14,125; Referee: José María Sánchez Martínez (Spain)

28 March 2023 UEFA Euro 2024 qualifying	Turkey	0–2	Croatia	Bursa, Turkey
21:45 TRT (UTC+03:00)		Report	Kovačić 20', 45+4'	Stadium: Bursa Metropolitan Municipality Stadium; Attendance: 37,750; Referee: Andreas Ekberg (Sweden)

16 June 2023 UEFA Euro 2024 qualifying	Latvia	2–3	Turkey	Riga, Latvia
21:45 EEST (UTC+03:00)	Emsis 51'; Tobers 90+4'	Report	Bardakcı 23'; Ünder 61'; Kahveci 90+5'	Stadium: Skonto Stadium; Attendance: 6,287; Referee: Tamás Bognár (Hungary)

19 June 2023 UEFA Euro 2024 qualifying	Turkey	2–0	Wales	Samsun, Turkey
21:45 TRT (UTC+03:00)	Nayir 72'; Güler 80'	Report		Stadium: Samsun Stadium; Referee: Fabio Maresca (Italy)

== Turkish clubs in Europe ==
=== UEFA Champions League ===
==== Second qualifying round ====
Team 1	Agg.	Team 2	1st leg	2nd leg
Dynamo Kyiv (Ukraine)	2–1	(Turkey) Fenerbahçe	0–0	2–1 (a.e.t.)

==== Play-off round ====
Team 1	Agg.	Team 2	1st leg	2nd leg
Copenhagen (Denmark)	2–1	(Turkey) Trabzonspor	2–1	0–0

=== UEFA Europa League ===
==== Play-off round ====
Team 1	Agg.	Team 2	1st leg	2nd leg
Austria Wien	1–6	(Turkey) Fenerbahçe	0–2	1–4
Malmö FF (Sweden)	5–1	(Turkey) Sivasspor	3–1	2–0

==== Group stage ====
===== Group B =====
Pos	Team	Pld	W	D	L	GF	GA	GD	Pts	Qualification	FEN	REN	AEK	DKV
1	(Turkey) Fenerbahçe	6	4	2	0	13	7	+6	14	Advance to round of 16	—	3–3	2–0	2–1
2	(France) Rennes	6	3	3	0	11	8	+3	12	Advance to knockout round play-offs	2–2	—	1–1	2–1
3	(Cyprus) AEK Larnaca	6	1	2	3	7	10	−3	5	Transfer to Europa Conference League	1–2	1–2	—	3–3
4	(Ukraine) Dynamo Kyiv	6	0	1	5	5	11	−6	1		0–2	0–1	0–1	—

Source: UEFA
Rules for classification: Group stage tiebreakers

===== Group H =====
Pos	Team	Pld	W	D	L	GF	GA	GD	Pts	Qualification	FER	MON	TRA	ZVE
1	(Hungary) Ferencváros	6	3	1	2	8	9	−1	10 (Note: Head to head points: Ferencváros 4, Monaco 1.)	Advance to round of 16	—	1–1	3–2	2–1
2	(France) Monaco	6	3	1	2	9	8	+1	10	Advance to knockout round play-offs	0–1	—	3–1	4–1
3	(Turkey) Trabzonspor	6	3	0	3	11	9	+2	9	Transfer to Europa Conference League	1–0	4–0	—	2–1
4	(Serbia) Red Star Belgrade	6	2	0	4	9	11	−2	6		4–1	0–1	2–1	—

Source: UEFA
Rules for classification: Group stage tiebreakers

==== Knockout stage ====
===== Round of 16 =====
Team 1	Agg.	Team 2	1st leg	2nd leg
Sevilla (Spain)	2–1	(Turkey) Fenerbahçe	2–0	0–1

=== UEFA Europa Conference League ===
==== Second qualifying round ====
Team 1	Agg.	Team 2	1st leg	2nd leg
İstanbul Başakşehir (Turkey)	2–1	(Israel) Maccabi Netanya	1–1	1–0
BATE Borisov (Belarus)	0–5	(Turkey) Konyaspor	0–3	0–2

==== Third qualifying round ====
Team 1	Agg.	Team 2	1st leg	2nd leg
Breiðablik (Iceland)	1–6	(Turkey) İstanbul Başakşehir	1–3	0–3
Vaduz (Liechtenstein)	5–3	(Turkey) Konyaspor	1–1	4–2

==== Play-off round ====
Team 1	Agg.	Team 2	1st leg	2nd leg
İstanbul Başakşehir (Turkey)	4–2	(Belgium) Antwerp	1–1	3–1

==== Group stage ====
===== Group A =====
Pos	Team	Pld	W	D	L	GF	GA	GD	Pts	Qualification	IBS	FIO	HEA	RFS
1	(Turkey) İstanbul Başakşehir	6	4	1	1	14	3	+11	13 (Note: Tied on head-to-head points. Head-to-head goal difference: İstanbul Başakşehir +2, Fiorentina −2.)	Advance to round of 16	—	3–0	3–1	3–0
2	(Italy) Fiorentina	6	4	1	1	14	6	+8	13	Advance to knockout round play-offs	2–1	—	5–1	1–1
3	(Scotland) Heart of Midlothian	6	2	0	4	6	16	−10	6		0–4	0–3	—	2–1
4	(Latvia) RFS	6	0	2	4	2	11	−9	2		0–0	0–3	0–2	—

Source: UEFA

===== Group G =====
Pos	Team	Pld	W	D	L	GF	GA	GD	Pts	Qualification	SIV	CLJ	SLP	BLK
1	(Turkey) Sivasspor	6	3	2	1	11	7	+4	11	Advance to round of 16	—	3–0	1–1	3–4
2	(Romania) CFR Cluj	6	3	1	2	5	5	0	10	Advance to knockout round play-offs	0–1	—	2–0	1–0
3	(Czech Republic) Slavia Prague	6	2	2	2	6	7	−1	8		1–1	0–1	—	3–2
4	(Kosovo) Ballkani	6	1	1	4	8	11	−3	4		1–2	1–1	0–1	—

Source: UEFA

==== Knockout stage ====
===== Knockout round play-offs =====
Team 1	Agg.	Team 2	1st leg	2nd leg
Trabzonspor (Turkey)	1–2	(Switzerland) Basel	1–0	0–2

===== Round of 16 =====
Team 1	Agg.	Team 2	1st leg	2nd leg
Fiorentina (Italy)	5–1	(Turkey) Sivasspor	1–0	4–1
Gent (Belgium)	5–2	(Turkey) İstanbul Başakşehir	1–1	4–1
