= 2023–24 TFF 2. Lig =

23rd season of TFF Second League

TFF Second League
- Season: 2023–24
- Dates: 26 August 2023 – 4 May 2024
- Promoted: Esenler Erokspor; Amed; Iğdır
- Relegated: Adıyaman; Uşakspor; Bursaspor; Kırşehir; Denizlispor; Düzcespor; Zonguldak Kömürspor; Etimesgut Belediyespor
- Matches: 144
- Goals: 296 (2.06 per match)
- Biggest home win: Esenler Erokspor 4–0 Kırklarelispor (3 September 2023); Karaman 4–0 Uşakspor (8 October 2023)
- Biggest away win: Düzcespor 0–6 24 Erzincanspor (14 October 2023)
- Highest scoring: İnegölspor 5–2 Menemen (27 August 2023)
- Longest winning run: Vanspor; Esenler Erokspor (6 matches)
- Longest unbeaten run: Amed; Bucaspor 1928; Kastamonuspor 1966; Yeni Mersin İdmanyurdu (7 matches)
- Longest winless run: Kırklarelispor (4 matches)
- Longest losing run: Kırklarelispor; Kırşehir (8 matches)

The 2023–24 TFF Second League was the 23rd season of the third-level football league of Turkey since the league was established in 2001.

== Teams ==
- Çorum, Kocaelispor and Şanlıurfaspor promoted to 2023–24 TFF First League.
- Altınordu and Denizlispor relegated from 2022–23 TFF First League.
- 68 Aksaray Belediyespor, Iğdır, Yeni Mersin İdmanyurdu, Belediye Derincespor, Karaman and Beyoğlu Yeni Çarşı promoted from 2022–23 TFF Third League.
- Balıkesirspor, Batman Petrolspor, Bayburt Özel İdarespor, Pazarspor, Sivas Belediyespor and Tarsus İdman Yurdu relegated to 2023–24 TFF Third League.

== White Group ==
=== Teams and locations ===
Locations of teams in 2023–24 TFF Second League – White Group

| Team | Home city | Stadium | Capacity |
|---|---|---|---|
| 1461 Trabzon | Trabzon | Yavuz Selim Stadium | 1,820 |
| Adıyaman | Adıyaman | Adıyaman Atatürk Stadium | 8,596 |
| Afjet Afyonspor | Afyonkarahisar | Zafer Stadium | 14,558 |
| Altınordu | İzmir (Alsancak) | Bornova Aziz Kocaoğlu Stadium | 9,138 |
| Ankara Demirspor | Ankara | TCDD Ankara Demirspor Stadium | 1,520 |
| Ankaraspor | Ankara | Etimesgut Atatürk Stadium | 2,640 |
| Beyoğlu Yeni Çarşı | Istanbul (Beyoğlu) | Bayrampaşa Çetin Emeç Stadium | 2,370 |
| Bucaspor 1928 | İzmir (Buca) | Buca Stadium | 8,810 |
| Bursaspor | Bursa | Sütaş Timsah Park | 43,361 |
| Diyarbekirspor | Diyarbakır | Diyarbakır Stadium | 33,000 |
| Esenler Erokspor | Istanbul (Esenler) | Esenler Stadium | 5,296 |
| Karacabey Belediyespor | Bursa (Karacabey) | M. Fehmi Gerçeker Stadium | 2,772 |
| Kırklarelispor | Kırklareli | Kırklareli Atatürk Stadium | 3,750 |
| Kırşehir Futbol SK | Kırşehir | Kırşehir Ahi Stadium | 7,500 |
| Nazilli Belediyespor | Aydın (Nazilli) | Nazilli İlçe Stadium | 4,500 |
| Serik Belediyespor | Antalya (Serik) | İsmail Oğan Stadium | 2,250 |
| Vanspor | Van | Van Atatürk Stadium | 5,885 |
| Yeni Mersin İdmanyurdu | Mersin | Mersin Stadium | 25,497 |
| Zonguldak Kömürspor | Zonguldak | Karaelmas Kemal Köksal Stadium | 13,795 |

=== League table ===
| Pos | Team | Pld | W | D | L | GF | GA | GD | Pts | Qualification or relegation |
|---|---|---|---|---|---|---|---|---|---|---|
| 1 | Esenler Erokspor (C, P) | 36 | 26 | 5 | 5 | 83 | 29 | +54 | 83 | Promotion to the TFF First League |
| 2 | Vanspor (Note: Vanspor deducted 3 points) | 36 | 24 | 6 | 6 | 63 | 37 | +26 | 75 | Qualification for the TFF First League Playoff Group Final |
| 3 | Bucaspor 1928 | 36 | 21 | 10 | 5 | 54 | 25 | +29 | 73 | Qualification for the TFF First League Playoff Quarter Finals |
| 4 | 1461 Trabzon | 36 | 21 | 9 | 6 | 71 | 39 | +32 | 72 | Qualification for the TFF First League Playoff Quarter Finals |
| 5 | Ankaraspor | 36 | 15 | 13 | 8 | 45 | 35 | +10 | 58 (Note: Ranked on head-to-head points and head-to-head difference: Ankaraspor 4, Yeni Mersin Idmanyurdu 1.) | Qualification for the TFF First League Playoff Quarter Finals |
| 6 | Yeni Mersin İdmanyurdu | 36 | 16 | 10 | 10 | 50 | 36 | +14 | 58 | Qualification for the TFF First League Playoff Quarter Finals |
| 7 | Beyoğlu Yeni Çarşı | 36 | 15 | 7 | 14 | 47 | 38 | +9 | 52 | |
| 8 | Karacabey Belediyespor | 36 | 13 | 12 | 11 | 43 | 37 | +6 | 51 | |
| 9 | Ankara Demirspor | 36 | 15 | 5 | 16 | 43 | 46 | −3 | 50 | |
| 10 | Diyarbekirspor | 36 | 12 | 9 | 15 | 39 | 41 | −2 | 45 | |
| 11 | Kırklarelispor | 36 | 11 | 11 | 14 | 33 | 41 | −8 | 44 | |
| 12 | Altınordu | 36 | 10 | 13 | 13 | 45 | 39 | +6 | 43 | |
| 13 | Afjet Afyonspor | 36 | 10 | 12 | 14 | 25 | 38 | −13 | 42 | |
| 14 | Serik Belediyespor | 36 | 10 | 10 | 16 | 29 | 45 | −16 | 40 | |
| 15 | Nazilli Belediyespor (Note: Nazilli Belediyespor deducted 3 points) | 36 | 11 | 9 | 16 | 38 | 57 | −19 | 39 | |
| 16 | Zonguldak Kömürspor (Note: Zonguldak Kömürspor deducted 3 points) (R) | 36 | 11 | 8 | 17 | 41 | 57 | −16 | 38 | Relegation to the TFF Third League |
| 17 | Kırşehir Futbol SK (R) | 36 | 5 | 8 | 23 | 38 | 76 | −38 | 23 | Relegation to the TFF Third League |
| 18 | Bursaspor (Note: Bursaspor deducted 3 points) (R) | 36 | 6 | 8 | 22 | 28 | 64 | −36 | 23 | Relegation to the TFF Third League |
| 19 | Adıyaman (R) | 36 | 4 | 7 | 25 | 28 | 63 | −35 | 19 | Relegation to the TFF Third League |

Updated to match(es) played on 4 May 2024. Source: TFF
Rules for classification: 1) Points; 2) Head-to-head points; 3) Head-to-head goal difference; 4) Head-to-head goals scored; 5) Goal difference; 6) Goals scored
(C) Champions; (P) Promoted; (R) Relegated

=== Results ===
| Home \ Away | 61T | ADI | AFY | ATO | AND | ANK | BYÇ | B28 | BUR | DİY | ERO | KRC | KRK | KIR | NBS | SER | VAN | YMİ | ZKÖ |
|---|---|---|---|---|---|---|---|---|---|---|---|---|---|---|---|---|---|---|---|
| 1461 Trabzon | — | | 3–0 | | | | | | | | | 1–0 | | | 0–2 | | 4–0 | | 2–0 |
| Adıyaman | | — | | 1–1 | 0–3 | 0–2 | | 2–2 | | | | | | | | | | 0–0 | |
| Afjet Afyonspor | | | — | | | | | | | | 0–1 | 1–0 | | 1–1 | | | 0–1 | | 1–1 |
| Altınordu | | | | — | 1–2 | | | 0–0 | | | | | 4–0 | | 2–3 | 0–0 | | | |
| Ankara Demirspor | | | | | — | | 2–1 | 0–1 | | | | 2–1 | | | 1–2 | 1–0 | | | |
| Ankaraspor | 2–2 | | | | 3–0 | — | | 1–1 | | | | | 0–0 | | | 2–0 | | | |
| Beyoğlu Yeni Çarşı | | 1–0 | | 2–1 | | 0–1 | — | | 1–1 | | | | | 1–0 | | | | | |
| Bucaspor 1928 | | | | | | | 2–0 | — | 3–0 | | | 1–0 | | | 3–1 | | 0–1 | | |
| Bursaspor | | 1–0 | | 1–1 | 0–2 | 2–0 | | | — | | | | | | | | | 1–1 | |
| Diyarbekirspor | 0–1 | | 0–0 | | | | | | | — | | | 2–0 | | | 1–0 | | 0–2 | |
| Esenler Erokspor | 1–0 | | | | | 1–2 | | | | 3–0 | — | | 4–0 | | | | | 3–2 | |
| Karacabey Belediyespor | | 0–1 | | | | | | | 2–0 | | 0–2 | — | | 3–0 | | | | | 1–0 |
| Kırklarelispor | 0–0 | | 1–2 | | | | 2–1 | | | | | 0–0 | — | | 1–0 | | 1–2 | | |
| Kırşehir | | | | 1–0 | 1–4 | 0–1 | | | | 1–1 | 1–3 | | | — | | | | 1–3 | |
| Nazilli Belediyespor | | 3–0 | | | | | 1–0 | | 1–0 | | | | | 3–0 | — | | | | 0–3 |
| Serik Belediyespor | | | 1–0 | | | | 2–0 | | 1–2 | | | 0–0 | | | 1–1 | — | 0–2 | | |
| Vanspor | | 2–1 | | | | | | | | 2–1 | 1–0 | | | 2–0 | | | — | | 1–0 |
| Yeni Mersin İdmanyurdu | 0–3 | | 1–0 | | | | | 1–1 | | | | | 3–1 | | | 1–0 | | — | |
| Zonguldak Kömürspor | | | | 1–3 | | 1–2 | | | | 0–0 | 0–1 | | | | | | | 1–1 | — |

Updated to match(es) played on 22 October 2023. Source: TFF
Legend: Blue = home team win; Yellow = draw; Red = away team win.

== Red Group ==
=== Teams and locations ===
Locations of teams in 2023–24 TFF Second League – Red Group

| Team | Home city | Stadium | Capacity |
|---|---|---|---|
| 24 Erzincanspor | Erzincan | Erzincan 13 Şubat City Stadium | 12,981 |
| 68 Aksaray Belediyespor | Aksaray | Dağılgan Stadium | 5,000 |
| Amed | Diyarbakır | Diyarbakır Stadium | 33,000 |
| Arnavutköy Belediyespor | Istanbul (Arnavutköy) | Bolluca Stadium | 1,000 |
| Belediye Derincespor | Kocaeli (Derince) | Belediye Derincespor Stadium | 1,500 |
| Denizlispor | Denizli | Denizli Atatürk Stadium | 18,745 |
| Düzcespor | Düzce | 18 Temmuz Stadium | 5,000 |
| Etimesgut Belediyespor | Ankara (Etimesgut) | Etimesgut Atatürk Stadium | 2,640 |
| Fethiyespor | Muğla (Fethiye) | Fethiye İlçe Stadium | 6,963 |
| Iğdır | Iğdır | Iğdır City Stadium | 2,700 |
| Isparta 32 SK | Isparta | Isparta Atatürk Stadium | 4,345 |
| İnegölspor | Bursa (İnegöl) | İnegöl İlçe Stadium | 3,950 |
| İskenderunspor | Hatay (İskenderun) | İskenderun 5 Temmuz Stadium | 8,217 |
| Karaman FK | Karaman | Kemal Kaynaş Stadium | 3,024 |
| Kastamonuspor 1966 | Kastamonu | Kastamonu Gazi Stadium | 4,033 |
| Menemen | İzmir (Menemen) | Menemen İlçe Stadium | 4,420 |
| Sarıyer | Istanbul (Sarıyer) | Yusuf Ziya Öniş Stadium | 4,100 |
| Somaspor | Manisa (Soma) | Soma Atatürk Stadium | 3,500 |
| Uşakspor (1984) | Uşak | Uşak 1 Eylül Stadium | 3,500 |

=== League table ===
| Pos | Team | Pld | W | D | L | GF | GA | GD | Pts | Qualification or relegation |
|---|---|---|---|---|---|---|---|---|---|---|
| 1 | Amed (C, P) | 36 | 24 | 9 | 3 | 73 | 26 | +47 | 81 | Promotion to the TFF First League |
| 2 | Kastamonuspor 1966 | 36 | 23 | 9 | 4 | 63 | 26 | +37 | 78 | Qualification for the TFF First League Playoff Group Final |
| 3 | Iğdır (O, P) | 36 | 21 | 11 | 4 | 70 | 27 | +43 | 74 | Qualification for the TFF First League Playoff Quarter Finals |
| 4 | 24 Erzincanspor | 36 | 19 | 9 | 8 | 56 | 33 | +23 | 66 | Qualification for the TFF First League Playoff Quarter Finals |
| 5 | Menemen | 36 | 19 | 8 | 9 | 67 | 41 | +26 | 65 | Qualification for the TFF First League Playoff Quarter Finals |
| 6 | İskenderunspor | 36 | 18 | 6 | 12 | 62 | 47 | +15 | 60 | Qualification for the TFF First League Playoff Quarter Finals |
| 7 | Isparta 32 SK | 36 | 17 | 3 | 16 | 39 | 52 | −13 | 54 | |
| 8 | Somaspor | 36 | 14 | 8 | 14 | 42 | 42 | 0 | 50 | |
| 9 | İnegölspor | 36 | 13 | 10 | 13 | 46 | 47 | −1 | 49 | |
| 10 | Fethiyespor | 36 | 10 | 14 | 12 | 46 | 46 | 0 | 44 | |
| 11 | Karaman FK | 36 | 11 | 9 | 16 | 40 | 61 | −21 | 42 (Note: Ranked on head-to-head points: Karaman FK 7, 68 Aksaray Belediyespor 5, Arnavutköy Belediyespor 4.) | |
| 12 | 68 Aksaray Belediyespor | 36 | 10 | 12 | 14 | 29 | 30 | −1 | 42 | |
| 13 | Arnavutköy Belediyespor | 36 | 10 | 12 | 14 | 44 | 46 | −2 | 42 | |
| 14 | Sarıyer | 36 | 10 | 11 | 15 | 46 | 46 | 0 | 41 | |
| 15 | Belediye Derincespor | 36 | 10 | 10 | 16 | 38 | 43 | −5 | 40 (Note: Ranked on head-to-head points and head-to-head goal difference: Belediye Derincespor 3 (+1), Etimesgut Belediyespor 3 (-1).) | |
| 16 | Etimesgut Belediyespor (R) | 36 | 11 | 7 | 18 | 25 | 38 | −13 | 40 | Relegation to the TFF Third League |
| 17 | Düzcespor (R) | 36 | 9 | 10 | 17 | 42 | 63 | −21 | 37 | Relegation to the TFF Third League |
| 18 | Denizlispor (R) | 36 | 8 | 8 | 20 | 37 | 57 | −20 | 32 | Relegation to the TFF Third League |
| 19 | Uşakspor (1984) (R) | 36 | 1 | 2 | 33 | 14 | 108 | −94 | 5 | Relegation to the TFF Third League |

Updated to match(es) played on 4 May 2024. Source: TFF
Rules for classification: 1) Points; 2) Head-to-head points; 3) Head-to-head goal difference; 4) Head-to-head goals scored; 5) Goal difference; 6) Goals scored
(C) Champions; (O) Play-off winners; (P) Promoted; (R) Relegated

=== Results ===
| Home \ Away | 24E | 68A | AME | ARN | BDE | DEN | DÜZ | ETB | FET | IĞD | I32 | İNE | İSK | KAR | KST | MEN | SAR | SOM | UŞA |
|---|---|---|---|---|---|---|---|---|---|---|---|---|---|---|---|---|---|---|---|
| 24 Erzincanspor | — | | | | | | | | | 2–0 | | 1–0 | | | | 0–2 | 2–2 | | |
| 68 Aksaray Belediyespor | | — | 1–2 | | | | | 3–0 | | | 1–2 | | | | | | | | 0–0 |
| Amed | | | — | | 2–1 | 2–0 | 2–0 | | | | | | 1–0 | | | | | | |
| Arnavutköy Belediyespor | | 0–0 | | — | | | | | | 0–1 | | | | | | 1–1 | 3–1 | | 1–0 |
| Belediye Derincespor | | 0–0 | | | — | | | | | | | | | 0–0 | | | 1–0 | | 0–1 |
| Denizlispor | 1–1 | | | 3–2 | | — | | | | | | 2–0 | | 1–1 | | | | | |
| Düzcespor | 0–6 | | | 2–1 | 2–1 | | — | | | | | | | 1–1 | | | | | |
| Etimesgut Belediyespor | | | | | | 0–2 | 1–0 | — | | | | | 0–2 | | 1–2 | | | 0–2 | |
| Fethiyespor | | | | | | 3–1 | | | — | | | | | | 0–1 | | | 1–1 | |
| Iğdır | | | | | | | | 0–0 | 1–1 | — | | | | | 0–0 | 2–1 | | | |
| Isparta 32 | | | | | | 2–1 | 3–1 | | | | — | | 2–1 | | | | | 1–2 | |
| İnegölspor | | | | | | | | | 0–0 | 0–2 | | — | | | | 5–2 | 2–1 | | |
| İskenderunspor | | 0–1 | | 1–0 | 0–0 | | | | | | | | — | 2–0 | | | | | |
| Karaman | | 0–0 | 1–2 | | | | | | | | | | | — | | 0–1 | 2–3 | | 4–0 |
| Kastamonuspor 1966 | 2–0 | | | | | 2–0 | | | | | | 2–0 | | | — | | | 1–0 | |
| Menemen | | | | | | | | 0–2 | 2–1 | | 0–1 | | | | 1–1 | — | | | |
| Sarıyer | | | 1–1 | | | | | 2–1 | 2–2 | | 1–0 | | | | | | — | | |
| Somaspor | 1–1 | | | 1–0 | | | | | | 0–2 | | 3–3 | | | | | | — | |
| Uşakspor | | | 0–4 | | | | 1–2 | | | | 0–2 | | 0–2 | | | | | | — |

Updated to match(es) played on 18 October 2023. Source: TFF
Legend: Blue = home team win; Yellow = draw; Red = away team win.

== Promotion Playoffs ==
=== Bracket ===
First round
W3 | Bucaspor 1928 | 0
W6 | Yeni Mersin İdmanyurdu | 1
White Group
W4 | 1461 Trabzon | 4
W5 | Ankaraspor | 1
R3 | Iğdır | 1
R6 | İskenderunspor | 0
Red Group
R4 | 24 Erzincanspor | 3
R5 | Menemen | 2

Second round
W6 | Yeni Mersin İdmanyurdu | 0 | 1 | 1
W4 | 1461 Trabzon | 0 | 2 | 2
R3 | Iğdır | 3 | 3 | 6
R4 | 24 Erzincanspor | 0 | 1 | 1

Third round
W2 | Vanspor | 0 | 1 | 1
W4 | 1461 Trabzon | 2 | 1 | 3
R2 | Kastamonuspor 1966 | 1 | 1 | 2
R3 | Iğdır | 2 | 3 | 5

Final
W4 | 1461 Trabzon | 1
R3 | Iğdır | 3

==== First round ====
9 May 2024
19:00 EEST

| Bucaspor 1928 | 0–1 | Yeni Mersin İdmanyurdu |
|---|---|---|
| | Report | Evren 86' |

Yeni Buca Stadı, İzmir
Referee: G. Hasova
9 May 2024
15:30 EEST

| 1461 Trabzon | 4–1 | Ankaraspor |
|---|---|---|
| Depe 30', 88'; Velioğlu 76'; Tekdal 83' | Report | Sezgin 26' |

Yavuz Selim Stadium, Ortahisar
Referee: Adnan Deniz Kayatepe
9 May 2024
15:30 EEST

| Iğdır | 1–0 | İskenderunspor |
|---|---|---|
| Sönmez 88' | Report |

Iğdır Şehir Stadium, Iğdır
Referee: O. Uğurlu
9 May 2024
19:00 EEST

| 24 Erzincanspor | 3–2 | Menemenspor |
|---|---|---|
| Kaya 70'; İçer 88'; Yılmaz 116' | Report | Akdeniz 19'; Rüzgar 85' |

Stadion 13 Şubat Şehir Stadyumu, Erzincan
Referee: A. Şen

==== Second round ====
13 May 2024
19:00 EEST

| Yeni Mersin İdman Yurdu | 0–0 | 1461 Trabzon FK |
|---|---|---|
| | Report |

Mersin Stadyumu, Mersin
Referee: O. Ergün
13 May 2024
19:00 EEST

| 24 Erzincanspor | 0–3 | Iğdır FK |
|---|---|---|
| | Report | Cavlan 64'; Soy 81'; Akçay 86' |

13 Şubat Şehir Stadyumu, Erzincan
Referee: A. Yılmaz
17 May 2024
14:30 EEST

| Iğdır FK | 3–1 | 24 Erzincanspor |
|---|---|---|
| Yavuz 4'; Soy 29'; Alıç 67' | Report | Altınöz 31' |

Iğdır Şehir Stadium, Iğdır
Referee: F. Tokail
