= 2022–23 TFF 2. Lig =

22nd season of TFF Second League

TFF Second League
- Season: 2022–23
- Dates: 27 August 2022 – 15 June 2023
- Champions: White Group: Çorum; Red Group: Kocaelispor
- Promoted: Çorum; Kocaelispor; Şanlıurfaspor
- Relegated: Balıkesirspor; Batman Petrolspor; Bayburt Özel İdarespor; Pazarspor; Sivas Belediyespor; Tarsus İdman Yurdu
- Matches: 721
- Goals: 1,897 (2.63 per match)
- Biggest home win: Şanlıurfaspor 11-0 Tarsus İdman Yurdu (5 March 2023)
- Highest scoring: Şanlıurfaspor 11-0 Tarsus İdman Yurdu (5 March 2023)
- Longest winning run: Çorum (10 matches)
- Longest unbeaten run: Çorum (21 matches)
- Longest winless run: Tarsus İdman Yurdu (26 matches)
- Longest losing run: Adıyaman (15 matches)

The 2022–23 TFF Second League was the 22nd season of the third-level football league of Turkey since the league was established in 2001.

== Teams ==
- Bodrumspor, Pendikspor and Sakaryaspor promoted to 2022–23 TFF First League.
- Balıkesirspor, Bursaspor, Kocaelispor and Menemenspor relegated from 2021–22 TFF First League.
- Arnavutköy Belediyespor, Batman Petrolspor, Düzcespor, Esenler Erokspor, Fethiyespor and İskenderunspor promoted from 2021–22 TFF Third League.
- 1922 Konyaspor, Akhisar Belediyespor, Ergene Velimeşe, Eskişehirspor, Kahramanmaraşspor, Niğde Anadolu and Turgutluspor relegated to 2022–23 TFF Third League.

== White Group ==
=== Teams and locations ===
Locations of teams in 2022–23 TFF Second League – White Group

Team	Home city	Stadium	Capacity
24 Erzincanspor	Erzincan	Erzincan 13 Şubat City Stadium	12,981
Afjet Afyonspor	Afyonkarahisar	Zafer Stadium	14,558
Amed	Diyarbakır	Diyarbakır Stadium	33,000
Ankaraspor	Ankara	Etimesgut Atatürk Stadium	2,640
Arnavutköy Belediyespor	Istanbul (Arnavutköy)	Bolluca Stadium	1,000
Batman Petrolspor	Batman	Batman Stadium	15,000
Bayburt Özel İdarespor	Bayburt	Bayburt Stadium	5,000
Bursaspor	Bursa	Bitçi Timsah Park	43,361
Çorum	Çorum	Çorum City Stadium	15,000
Düzcespor	Düzce	18 Temmuz Stadium	5,000
Esenler Erokspor	Istanbul (Esenler)	Esenler Stadium	5,296
Isparta 32 SK	Isparta	Isparta Atatürk Stadium	4,345
İnegölspor	Bursa (İnegöl)	İnegöl İlçe Stadium	3,950
Menemen	İzmir (Menemen)	Menemen İlçe Stadium	4,420
Nazilli Belediyespor	Aydın (Nazilli)	Nazilli İlçe Stadium	4,500
Sivas Belediyespor	Sivas	Muhsin Yazıcıoğlu Stadium	3,200
Somaspor	Manisa (Soma)	Soma Atatürk Stadium	3,500
Şanlıurfaspor	Şanlıurfa	Şanlıurfa 11 Nisan Stadium	28,965
Tarsus İdman Yurdu	Mersin (Tarsus)	Tarsus City Stadium	4,189

=== League table ===
Pos	Team	Pld	W	D	L	GF	GA	GD	Pts	Qualification or relegation
1	Çorum (C, P)	36	24	7	5	65	24	+41	79	Promotion to the TFF First League
2	Şanlıurfaspor (O, P)	36	22	9	5	75	25	+50	75	Qualification for the TFF First League Playoff Group Final
3	Esenler Erokspor	36	18	8	10	77	35	+42	62	Qualification for the TFF First League Playoff Quarter Finals
4	Amed	36	17	9	10	63	36	+27	60	Qualification for the TFF First League Playoff Quarter Finals
5	24 Erzincanspor	36	16	10	10	50	34	+16	58 (Note: Head to head points: 24 Erzincanspor 4 points, Ankaraspor 1 point)	Qualification for the TFF First League Playoff Quarter Finals
6	Ankaraspor	36	16	10	10	58	42	+16	58	Qualification for the TFF First League Playoff Quarter Finals
7	Somaspor (Note: Somaspor have been deducted 3 points by the Club Licensing Board for failing to meet the licensing requirements.)	36	17	9	10	54	35	+19	57	
8	Düzcespor	36	14	10	12	55	46	+9	52	
9	Menemen	36	15	9	12	57	44	+13	51	
10	Afjet Afyonspor	36	12	11	13	48	47	+1	47 (Note: Head to head points: Afyonspor 3 points, +1 goal difference, İnegölspor 3 points, -1 goal difference)	
11	İnegölspor	36	14	5	17	40	53	−13	47	
12	Isparta 32	36	12	10	14	43	42	+1	46 (Note: Head to head points: Isparta 32 10 points, +5 goal difference, Arnavutköy Belediyespor 10 points, +1 goal difference, Bursaspor 8 points, Nazilli Belediyespor 5 points)	
13	Arnavutköy Belediyespor	36	12	10	14	41	42	−1	46	
14	Bursaspor	36	12	10	14	51	57	−6	46	
15	Nazilli Belediyespor	36	12	10	14	48	48	0	46	
16	Batman Petrolspor (R)	36	12	9	15	40	44	−4	45	Relegation to the TFF Third League
17	Tarsus İdman Yurdu (R)	36	3	12	21	26	125	−99	21	Relegation to the TFF Third League
18	Bayburt Özel İdarespor (R)	36	5	7	24	25	68	−43	19	Relegation to the TFF Third League
19	Sivas Belediyespor (R)	36	2	9	25	27	96	−69	15	Relegation to the TFF Third League

Source: TFF
Rules for classification: 1) Points; 2) Head-to-head points; 3) Head-to-head goal difference; 4) Head-to-head goals scored; 5) Goal difference; 6) Goals scored
(C) Champions; (O) Play-off winners; (P) Promoted; (R) Relegated

=== Results ===
Home \ Away	24E	AFY	AME	ANK	ARN	BPS	BYB	BUR	ÇFK	DÜZ	ERO	I32	İNE	MEN	NBS	SBS	SOM	ŞAN	TİY
24 Erzincanspor	—	3–1	1–0	0–0	1–1	2–0	1–0	2–0	0–1	0–1	1–1	3–2	2–1	2–1	2–0	1–1	1–1	1–2	1–1
Afjet Afyonspor	0–0	—	1–1	2–3	2–1	1–1	1–0	1–0	2–1	0–1	0–3	1–0	0–1	2–0	1–1	4–0	0–2	2–3	5–1
Amed	1–2	0–2	—	0–0	2–1	2–0	2–0	2–0	0–2	4–0	1–0	4–0	0–2	2–1	3–0	3–0	0–0	1–0	8–0
Ankaraspor	1–2	2–2	4–2	—	0–0	2–1	3–1	1–1	0–1	0–2	2–4	1–2	4–0	3–1	0–0	0–0	0–3	2–0	9–0
Arnavutköy Belediyespor	0–0	0–0	1–0	2–1	—	0–0	0–0	3–0	2–3	2–1	1–0	1–0	1–1	1–2	1–2	2–1	0–2	0–6	0–1
Batman Petrolspor	0–2	1–0	0–1	2–4	1–0	—	2–0	1–2	0–1	3–2	1–1	1–2	1–0	2–2	3–0	3–0	1–2	0–3	0–0
Bayburt Özel İdarespor	0–1	2–2	1–4	0–2	1–1	1–1	—	2–0	0–2	1–1	0–7	0–1	1–0	1–2	1–3	2–1	0–3	0–1	1–1
Bursaspor	2–1	1–1	2–1	0–1	4–1	1–0	3–1	—	0–3	0–0	0–3	1–2	2–1	1–1	1–0	6–0	3–5	0–2	2–2
Çorum	1–0	2–2	0–2	1–3	2–0	4–1	3–0	2–1	—	1–0	1–0	2–1	2–0	2–1	4–2	3–0	2–0	0–0	9–0
Düzcespor	0–2	2–0	2–2	3–1	0–1	1–2	3–0	3–3	3–1	—	1–2	1–0	0–2	0–0	1–2	5–2	3–3	0–0	4–0
Esenler Erokspor	1–1	5–1	1–2	3–0	1–0	2–2	2–0	2–2	2–0	0–3	—	1–0	5–0	4–0	3–2	6–1	0–0	1–1	2–0
Isparta 32	1–0	0–0	1–1	1–1	1–2	1–2	1–0	2–2	0–0	3–2	0–0	—	0–0	0–0	4–0	6–0	2–1	0–3	6–1
İnegölspor	1–1	1–3	0–2	1–1	2–1	1–0	3–0	0–2	0–3	0–1	2–1	2–0	—	2–0	2–1	4–1	1–0	1–2	4–0
Menemen	2–0	2–1	4–3	3–0	0–1	1–1	3–0	0–1	1–1	2–2	1–0	4–0	2–1	—	0–0	0–0	3–2	1–2	2–1
Nazilli Belediyespor	4–1	1–1	3–3	0–1	1–1	1–1	2–0	1–1	0–2	0–2	3–2	0–2	2–0	2–0	—	4–0	2–0	2–0	5–0
Sivas Belediyespor	2–7	0–2	2–2	1–3	1–3	0–1	1–2	0–2	0–2	0–0	2–3	0–0	0–2	0–9	1–1	—	1–2	1–3	1–0
Somaspor	2–1	3–2	1–1	0–1	1–0	0–1	1–1	3–1	0–0	2–3	2–1	2–0	3–1	1–0	2–0	1–1	—	0–1	0–1
Şanlıurfaspor	2–1	1–2	1–0	0–0	1–1	2–0	3–0	4–1	0–0	4–1	2–1	2–1	8–0	3–4	1–0	0–0	0–0	—	11–0
Tarsus İdman Yurdu	0–4	2–1	1–1	1–2	1–9	0–4	1–6	3–3	1–1	1–1	0–7	1–1	1–1	0–2	1–1	2–6	0–4	1–1	—

Source: TFF
Legend: Blue = home team win; Yellow = draw; Red = away team win.

== Red Group ==
=== Teams and locations ===
Locations of teams in 2022–23 TFF Second League – Red Group

Team	Home city	Stadium	Capacity
1461 Trabzon	Trabzon	Yavuz Selim Stadium	1,820
Adıyaman	Adıyaman	Adıyaman Atatürk Stadium	8,596
Ankara Demirspor	Ankara	TCDD Ankara Demirspor Stadium	1,520
Balıkesirspor	Balıkesir	Balıkesir Atatürk Stadium	13,372
Bucaspor 1928	İzmir (Buca)	Buca Stadium	8,810
Diyarbekirspor	Diyarbakır	Diyarbakır Stadium	33,000
Etimesgut Belediyespor	Ankara (Etimesgut)	Etimesgut Atatürk Stadium	2,640
Fethiyespor	Muğla (Fethiye)	Fethiye İlçe Stadium	6,963
İskenderunspor	Hatay (İskenderun)		
Karacabey Belediyespor	Bursa (Karacabey)	M. Fehmi Gerçeker Stadium	2,772
Kastamonuspor 1966	Kastamonu	Kastamonu Gazi Stadium	4,033
Kırklarelispor	Kırklareli	Kırklareli Atatürk Stadium	3,750
Kırşehir	Kırşehir	Kırşehir Ahi Stadium	7,500
Pazarspor	Rize (Pazar)	Pazar İlçe Stadium	2,442
Sarıyer	Istanbul (Sarıyer)	Yusuf Ziya Öniş Stadium	4,100
Serik Belediyespor	Antalya (Serik)	İsmail Oğan Stadium	2,250
Uşakspor	Uşak	Uşak 1 Eylül Stadium	3,500
Vanspor	Van	Van Atatürk Stadium	5,885
Zonguldak Kömürspor	Zonguldak	Karaelmas Kemal Köksal Stadium	13,795

=== League table ===
Pos	Team	Pld	W	D	L	GF	GA	GD	Pts	Qualification or relegation
1	Kocaelispor (C, P)	38	25	9	4	73	28	+45	84	Promotion to the TFF First League
2	Bucaspor 1928	38	24	9	5	63	22	+41	81	Qualification for the TFF First League Playoff Group Final
3	İskenderunspor	38	23	8	7	65	31	+34	77	Qualification for the TFF First League Playoff Quarter Finals
4	1461 Trabzon	38	22	8	8	62	27	+35	74 (Note: Head to head points: 1461 Trabzon 2 points, 0 goal difference; Vanspor 2 points, 0 goal difference)	Qualification for the TFF First League Playoff Quarter Finals
5	Vanspor	38	21	11	6	58	27	+31	74	Qualification for the TFF First League Playoff Quarter Finals
6	Ankara Demirspor	38	20	11	7	65	32	+33	71	Qualification for the TFF First League Playoff Quarter Finals
7	Karacabey Belediyespor	38	19	11	8	55	31	+24	68	
8	Fethiyespor	38	16	7	15	59	51	+8	55	
9	Zonguldak Kömürspor	38	15	8	15	45	50	−5	53	
10	Serik Belediyespor (Note: Balıkesir have been deducted 3 points by the Club Licensing Board for failing to meet the licensing requirements.)	38	14	11	13	54	43	+11	50	
11	Kırşehir	38	12	12	14	49	54	−5	48	
12	Kırklarelispor	38	10	16	12	38	35	+3	46	
13	Etimesgut Belediyespor	38	11	12	15	43	51	−8	45	
14	Kastamonuspor 1966	38	11	10	17	41	47	−6	43	
15	Sarıyer	38	10	12	16	46	57	−11	42	
16	Uşakspor	38	8	9	21	37	64	−27	33	
17	Balıkesirspor (R)	38	6	10	22	32	76	−44	25	Relegation to the TFF Third League
18	Adıyaman (Note: Adıyaman and Diyarbekirspor withdrew from the league following the 2023 Turkey–Syria earthquake and were not relegated at the end of the season.)	37	5	8	24	22	70	−48	23 (Note: Head to head points: Adıyaman 3 points, +1 goal difference; Pazarspor 3 puan, -1 goal difference)	Withdrawn
19	Pazarspor (R)	38	4	11	23	29	79	−50	23	Relegation to the TFF Third League
20	Diyarbekirspor	37	2	9	26	18	79	−61	15	Withdrawn

Source: TFF
Rules for classification: 1) Points; 2) Head-to-head points; 3) Head-to-head goal difference; 4) Head-to-head goals scored; 5) Goal difference; 6) Goals scored
(C) Champions; (P) Promoted; (R) Relegated

=== Results ===
Home \ Away	61T	ADI	AND	BAL	B28	DİY	ETB	FET	İSK	KRC	KST	KRK	KBL	KOC	PAZ	SAR	SER	UŞA	VAN	ZKÖ
1461 Trabzon	—	2–1	2–1	2–1	0–2	3–0	3–0	2–0	0–1	0–0	1–1	2–0	5–1	3–0	8–0	1–2	1–0	1–0	0–0	0–0
Adıyaman	0–1	—	2–1	0–3	0–3	3–0	0–0	0–3	0–3	0–3	0–3	0–1	1–1	0–3	4–0	0–0	0–3	1–0	1–1	1–0
Ankara Demirspor	0–0	3–0	—	3–1	2–0	3–0	1–0	2–1	1–1	3–1	0–1	2–2	0–0	1–0	2–0	1–0	2–1	1–1	2–2	4–0
Balıkesirspor	1–2	1–1	0–2	—	0–3	4–2	0–3	2–0	2–2	0–2	1–1	1–1	1–0	1–6	0–2	1–1	1–4	0–1	0–3	3–3
Bucaspor 1928	2–1	5–1	1–0	2–0	—	4–0	2–1	3–1	3–2	0–0	2–0	0–1	0–0	1–0	2–0	3–1	0–0	3–0	0–1	2–0
Diyarbekirspor	1–2	Can.	1–1	1–0	0–3	—	2–2	0–0	0–0	0–3	0–3	0–3	0–0	0–3	2–2	1–1	0–3	1–0	0–3	0–1
Etimesgut Belediyespor	1–2	3–0	0–4	1–1	1–0	3–0	—	2–3	1–2	2–1	1–1	1–1	1–1	0–3	2–0	1–1	2–0	1–1	0–1	3–0
Fethiyespor	1–0	1–1	0–2	7–1	2–0	3–1	1–0	—	0–0	2–0	1–0	1–0	3–2	0–1	1–0	1–1	2–0	0–2	1–0	1–2
İskenderunspor	1–0	1–0	1–0	1–0	1–2	3–0	3–0	2–1	—	0–1	4–2	2–1	4–1	1–1	0–0	4–1	1–1	5–1	1–0	1–0
Karacabey Belediyespor	1–0	2–1	2–2	1–1	0–0	1–0	0–1	2–1	1–1	—	4–2	2–0	5–0	2–2	4–2	2–0	1–1	1–0	2–0	1–2
Kastamonuspor 1966	2–4	2–2	1–1	1–0	0–0	2–1	1–0	0–0	0–2	1–2	—	0–0	3–2	0–1	2–0	4–1	1–2	0–1	0–1	3–1
Kırklarelispor	1–2	0–0	1–1	0–0	0–0	2–1	3–1	3–4	0–2	1–1	3–0	—	0–1	0–0	4–0	0–0	1–0	2–2	1–1	1–0
Kırşehir	2–1	3–0	1–0	0–0	2–2	3–0	2–4	5–3	1–3	1–1	2–0	1–1	—	0–1	2–2	1–1	1–1	3–0	1–0	0–2
Kocaelispor	1–1	2–0	2–4	3–0	1–1	1–0	4–0	4–3	1–0	1–0	2–1	2–1	3–0	—	1–1	2–1	0–0	3–0	4–2	3–0
Pazarspor	1–1	3–0	0–2	0–1	0–1	1–1	1–1	1–7	1–3	0–2	0–1	0–0	0–4	1–3	—	3–2	0–2	2–2	0–2	1–1
Sarıyer	0–3	3–0	0–2	2–4	1–2	3–0	0–1	1–1	2–1	2–0	2–1	1–2	1–0	3–3	1–3	—	1–1	3–1	2–3	1–0
Serik Belediyespor	1–2	3–2	1–1	1–0	1–5	4–1	3–0	1–1	1–2	0–1	1–0	1–1	3–0	0–1	3–0	1–2	—	3–1	2–4	1–1
Uşakspor	0–1	3–0	2–4	2–0	1–2	2–1	1–1	2–0	1–3	0–3	1–1	1–0	1–3	0–3	1–1	1–1	0–1	—	1–2	2–3
Vanspor	1–1	1–0	1–0	8–0	0–1	1–1	1–1	2–0	2–0	2–0	0–0	1–0	1–0	0–0	1–0	1–1	2–2	3–1	—	3–1
Zonguldak Kömürspor	0–2	3–0	3–4	2–0	1–1	3–0	1–1	4–2	2–1	0–0	1–0	1–0	0–2	0–2	3–1	1–0	2–1	1–1	0–1	—

Source: TFF
Legend: Blue = home team win; Yellow = draw; Red = away team win.

== Promotion Playoffs ==
=== Bracket ===
First round
W3	Esenler Erokspor	4
W6	Ankaraspor	2
White Group
W4	Amed	0
W5	24 Erzincanspor	1
R3	İskenderunspor (4–2 p)	2
R6	Ankara Demirspor	2
Red Group
R4	1461 Trabzon (5–4 p)	1
R5	Vanspor	1

Second round
W3	Esenler Erokspor	1	2	3
W5	24 Erzincanspor (4-3 p)	2	1	3
R3	İskenderunspor	3	0	3
R4	1461 Trabzon	1	1	2

Third round
W2	Şanlıurfaspor	3	2	5
W5	24 Erzincanspor	2	0	2
R2	Bucaspor 1928	3	1	4
R3	İskenderunspor	1	0	1

Final
W2	Şanlıurfaspor	3
R2	Bucaspor 1928	0
