= 2025–26 TFF 2. Lig =

TFF Second League
- Season: 2025–26
- Dates: 23 August 2025 – 10 May 2026
- Teams: 37
- Champions: Red Group: Batman Petrolspor; White Group: Bursaspor
- Promoted: Batman Petrolspor; Bursaspor; Mardin 1969; Muğlaspor
- Relegated: Adanaspor; Beykoz Anadoluspor; Bucaspor 1928; Karaman; Kepezspor; Yeni Malatyaspor; Yeni Mersin İdmanyurdu
- Matches: 647
- Goals: 1,930 (2.98 per match)

The 2025–26 TFF Second League was the 25th season of the third-tier football league system in Turkey since its reorganization in 2001. Organized by the Turkish Football Federation (TFF), the season began on 30 August 2025 and concluded with the play-off finals on 10 May 2026.

The league continues to operate under the sponsorship name Nesine 2. Lig following a naming rights agreement established in 2024. For this campaign, the league consists of 37 clubs divided into two groups: the White Group (Beyaz Grup) with 19 teams and the Red Group (Kırmızı Grup) with 18 teams.

The winners of each group earn automatic promotion to the TFF First League, while teams finishing second through sixth in each group qualify for a promotion play-off series. Following the TFF's restructuring initiative to reduce the number of professional teams across the leagues, three teams from each group will be relegated to the TFF Third League at the end of the regular season.

== Teams ==
=== Changes from 2024–25 ===
==== To TFF Second League ====
Promoted from 2024–25 TFF Third League/

- Bursaspor, Amasyaspor FK, Aliağa FK, and Mardin 1969 (Group winners).
- Kahramanmaraş İstiklalspor and Muşspor (Play-off winners).

Relegated from 2024–25 TFF First League

- Sakaryaspor, Adanaspor, Şanlıurfaspor, and Yeni Malatyaspor (Bottom four finishers).

==== From TFF Second League ====
Promoted to 2025–26 TFF First League

- Sarıyer, Serik Belediyespor, and Vanspor (Group winners and play-off winner).

Relegated to 2025–26 TFF Third League

- Afyonspor, Nazilli Belediyespor, Düzcespor, Derince Belediyespor, Uşakspor, and Diyarbekirspor (Bottom three of each group).

== White Group ==
=== Team information ===
Locations of 2025–26 2. Lig White Group teams on the map of Turkey

=== Table ===
Pos	Team	Pld	W	D	L	GF	GA	GD	Pts	Qualification or relegation
1	Batman Petrolspor	36	25	8	3	86	33	+53	83	Promotion to TFF 1. Lig
2	Muğlaspor (P)	36	21	9	6	51	19	+32	72	Qualification for promotion play-offs
3	Elazığspor	36	21	6	9	82	37	+45	69	Qualification for promotion play-offs
4	Adana 01	36	19	10	7	55	35	+20	67	Qualification for promotion play-offs
5	Şanlıurfaspor	36	19	8	9	63	43	+20	65	Qualification for promotion play-offs
6	MKE Ankaragücü	36	18	9	9	52	41	+11	63	
7	İnegölspor	36	16	12	8	67	44	+23	60	
8	İskenderunspor	36	16	8	12	50	44	+6	56	
9	Beyoğlu Yeni Çarşı	36	13	15	8	45	35	+10	54	
10	Ankaraspor	36	13	13	10	64	54	+10	52	
11	24 Erzincanspor	36	15	6	15	55	49	+6	51	
12	Kastamonuspor	36	11	9	16	44	56	−12	42	
13	Karacabey Belediyespor	36	11	8	17	46	55	−9	41	
14	Altınordu	36	8	11	17	33	59	−26	35	
15	Erbaaspor	36	10	7	19	40	61	−21	34 (Note: Erbaaspor were deducted 3 points.)	
16	Beykoz Anadoluspor	36	8	6	22	37	66	−29	30	Relegation to TFF 3. Lig
17	Kepezspor	36	5	8	23	33	78	−45	23	Relegation to TFF 3. Lig
18	Karaman	36	4	9	23	30	86	−56	21	Relegation to TFF 3. Lig
19	Bucaspor 1928	36	4	8	24	38	76	−38	17 (Note: Bucaspor 1928 were deducted 3 points.)	Relegation to TFF 3. Lig

Source: TFF
Rules for classification: 1) Points; 2) Head-to-head points; 3) Head-to-head goal difference; 4) Head-to-head goals scored; 5) Goal difference; 6) Goals scored; 7) Play-off.
(P) Promoted

=== Results ===
Home \ Away	24E	A01	ATO	ANK	BPS	BEA	BYÇ	B28	ELA	ERB	İNE	İSK	KRC	KAR	KST	KEP	AGÜ	MUĞ	ŞAN
24 Erzincanspor		3–0	2–0	2–4	0–4	4–0	2–2	2–2	1–1	3–2	0–1	0–1	3–0	2–1	2–0	2–1	0–2	0–0	3–1
Adana 01	1–0		0–0	3–2	1–1	1–0	0–0	2–1	4–0	3–0	4–1	2–0	2–1	0–0	1–1	2–0	1–0	2–1	0–1
Altınordu	0–1	0–3		1–0	0–4	0–4	0–2	2–0	1–2	1–1	2–2	1–1	0–1	5–1	1–0	2–2	1–1	0–1	0–2
Ankaraspor	1–1	4–0	1–1		2–3	1–1	0–2	3–2	2–3	3–1	1–1	2–1	0–0	5–4	2–2	1–1	2–1	2–2	2–1
Batman Petrolspor	4–0	3–1	1–1	4–4		0–1	4–1	1–0	2–0	3–0	2–1	2–0	4–1	0–2	2–1	6–0	2–1	1–0	2–1
Beykoz Anadoluspor	1–4	1–3	2–1	0–2	0–1		5–1	1–1	0–7	0–1	0–2	1–2	2–2	2–0	2–0	0–1	1–3	1–2	0–4
Beyoğlu Yeni Çarşı	2–0	0–0	1–1	1–1	0–0	1–0		3–0	0–0	3–1	2–3	0–0	0–0	1–1	0–1	1–0	1–2	1–1	2–1
Bucaspor 1928	0–4	2–1	1–2	2–4	3–3	0–1	1–1		1–5	1–1	3–3	0–1	1–4	5–0	0–1	0–1	0–1	0–5	0–2
Elazığspor	2–0	4–4	2–0	1–2	1–2	3–1	1–1	0–1		3–0	4–2	1–3	1–2	2–0	1–2	3–1	5–0	1–0	1–0
Erbaaspor	1–3	0–2	0–1	1–0	1–3	2–1	0–2	4–3	0–4		0–5	2–0	2–0	2–0	2–3	0–0	1–1	0–1	0–0
İnegölspor	4–0	0–0	3–1	2–2	1–1	3–1	1–1	4–0	2–2	1–2		1–0	2–1	6–1	2–2	3–0	1–2	0–2	1–2
İskenderunspor	2–1	2–3	4–0	1–0	2–2	2–0	1–1	1–1	0–1	1–0	1–1		0–2	3–1	2–0	2–1	4–2	2–1	1–3
Karacabey Belediyespor	1–0	1–1	2–1	3–3	2–4	3–1	0–3	0–1	0–3	1–2	0–1	4–3		1–0	4–0	1–1	0–2	0–1	1–2
Karaman	0–5	1–3	2–0	1–1	0–6	3–2	1–2	3–3	0–5	2–1	0–2	1–3	1–1		1–2	0–4	0–0	0–4	1–3
Kastamonuspor	1–0	1–0	7–1	0–1	1–2	1–1	0–2	2–0	0–0	1–1	1–3	0–2	2–1	2–2		1–1	0–2	0–3	2–4
Kepezspor	1–3	1–3	2–4	0–2	1–4	2–3	0–1	1–0	0–6	1–6	0–0	1–1	2–1	0–0	1–4		2–3	1–2	2–3
MKE Ankaragücü	1–1	0–0	1–1	2–1	1–1	1–1	3–2	1–0	1–4	1–0	1–2	4–1	2–0	1–0	1–0	2–0		0–1	4–1
Muğlaspor	2–0	2–0	0–1	1–0	2–0	0–0	1–0	2–1	2–1	2–1	3–0	0–0	0–3	0–0	1–1	4–0	2–0		0–0
Şanlıurfaspor	3–1	1–2	0–0	2–1	0–2	2–0	3–2	4–2	0–2	2–2	0–0	2–0	2–2	2–0	5–2	2–1	2–2	0–0	

Source: TFF
Legend: Blue = home team win; Yellow = draw; Red = away team win.

=== Positions by round ===
Notes:The table will be adjusted retrospectively after the postponed match(es) have been played.

Team ╲ Round	1	2	3	4	5	6	7	8	9	10	11	12	13	14	15	16	17	18	19	20	21	22	23	24	25	26	27	28	29	30	31	32	33	34	35	36	37	38
Batman Petrolspor	2	2	1	1	1	1	1	1	1	1	1	3	1	1	3	3	3	1	1	1	1	1	1	1	1	2	1	1	1	1	1	1	1	1	1	1	1	1
Muğlaspor	16	13	12	7	5	4	3	3	3	4	4	4	4	4	2	1	2	3	2	3	3	3	3	2	2	1	2	2	2	2	2	2	2	2	2	2	2	2
Elazığspor	5	12	6	8	6	8	6	4	4	5	6	9	8	9	8	8	5	8	8	9	9	8	8	8	8	8	8	8	8	8	6	5	4	4	4	4	4	3
Adana 01	4	4	4	6	10	7	5	8	8	8	10	7	10	8	9	9	7	6	7	7	7	7	6	7	6	7	6	7	7	6	5	3	3	3	3	3	3	4
Şanlıurfaspor	1	1	2	2	2	2	2	2	2	2	2	1	3	2	1	2	1	2	3	2	2	2	2	3	3	3	3	3	3	3	3	4	5	5	6	5	5	5
MKE Ankaragücü	13	15	18	18	15	14	15	13	13	12	9	11	12	12	11	10	10	9	9	8	8	10	10	10	10	9	9	9	9	9	9	8	8	6	5	6	6	6
İnegölspor	17	6	3	5	4	6	8	6	6	6	8	6	5	5	5	6	8	7	6	6	5	4	4	4	5	5	5	4	4	5	7	7	6	7	8	7	7	7
İskenderunspor	15	3	7	12	7	10	7	7	7	7	5	5	6	6	6	5	6	5	5	5	6	6	7	6	7	6	7	6	5	4	4	6	7	8	7	8	8	8
Beyoğlu Yeni Çarşı	14	10	10	13	13	15	11	11	10	11	13	13	13	13	13	13	12	12	11	11	11	11	11	11	12	12	12	12	12	12	12	12	10	10	10	9	11	9
Ankaraspor	3	5	8	3	3	3	4	5	5	3	3	2	2	3	4	4	4	4	4	4	4	5	5	5	4	4	4	5	6	7	8	9	9	9	9	10	9	10
24 Erzincanspor	8	8	5	9	12	9	10	9	12	13	12	12	9	10	10	11	11	11	12	12	12	12	12	12	11	11	11	11	11	11	11	10	11	11	11	11	10	11
Kastamonuspor	18	19	11	4	9	5	9	10	9	9	11	8	7	7	7	7	9	10	10	10	10	9	9	9	9	10	10	10	10	10	10	11	12	12	12	12	12	12
Karacabey Belediyespor	11	14	16	11	8	11	13	16	16	14	14	15	15	15	15	16	16	14	13	13	13	14	13	13	13	13	13	13	13	13	14	13	14	13	13	13	13	13
Altınordu	9	18	19	17	17	16	17	17	17	17	18	18	19	19	19	19	17	17	17	17	18	18	18	18	18	18	18	18	18	17	17	17	15	15	15	15	15	14
Erbaaspor	10	17	15	10	11	13	14	12	11	10	7	10	11	11	12	12	13	13	14	14	15	13	14	14	14	15	15	14	14	14	13	14	13	14	14	14	14	15
Beykoz Anadoluspor	19	7	9	14	14	12	12	15	15	16	17	17	17	16	16	14	14	15	15	15	14	15	15	15	15	14	14	15	15	15	15	15	16	16	16	16	16	16
Kepezspor	12	11	13	16	18	18	16	14	14	15	15	16	16	17	17	17	18	18	18	18	16	16	17	17	16	16	16	16	16	16	16	16	17	17	17	17	17	17
Karaman	7	9	14	15	16	17	18	18	18	18	16	14	14	14	14	15	15	16	16	16	17	17	16	16	17	17	17	17	17	18	18	18	18	18	18	18	18	18
Bucaspor 1928	6	16	17	19	19	19	19	19	19	19	19	19	18	18	18	18	19	19	19	19	19	19	19	19	19	19	19	19	19	19	19	19	19	19	19	19	19	19

2026–27 1. Lig	Play-off	2026–27 3. Lig

Source: TFF

=== Results by round ===
Team ╲ Round	1	2	3	4	5	6	7	8	9	10	11	12	13	14	15	16	17	18	19	20	21	22	23	24	25	26	27	28	29	30	31	32	33	34	35	36	37	38
24 Erzincanspor	AD	HD	AW	HL	AL	HW	AL	HW	AL	HL	AW	HD	AW	HL	AW	HL	B	AL	HD	HL	AL	HW	AL	WF	AW	HW	AL	HD	AD	HW	AW	HW	AL	HW	AL	B	HW	AL
Adana 01	AD	HW	AD	HD	AL	HW	AW	HL	AL	HW	AL	HW	AL	HW	AD	HW	AW	HW	B	HW	AD	HD	AW	HD	AD	HD	AW	HD	AL	HW	AW	HW	AW	HW	AW	HW	AL	B
Altınordu	HD	AL	HL	AD	HL	AD	HL	B	AD	HL	AL	HL	AL	HL	AD	HL	AW	HD	AL	AW	HD	AL	HL	AL	HD	AD	B	HL	AL	HW	AD	HW	AW	HW	AL	HW	AW	HD
Ankaraspor	AW	HD	B	AW	HW	AW	HD	AL	HW	AW	HW	AW	HW	AD	HD	AD	HD	AD	HW	HD	AL	B	HD	AW	HD	AD	HW	AL	HD	AL	HL	AL	HL	AL	HL	AD	HW	AL
Batman Petrolspor	HW	AW	HW	AW	HW	AW	HW	AD	HD	B	AW	HL	AW	HW	AL	HD	AW	HW	AW	AD	HW	AD	HW	AD	HW	AD	HW	AW	B	HW	AW	HW	AW	HW	AW	HL	AD	HW
Beykoz Anadoluspor	AL	HW	AD	HL	B	AW	HL	AL	HL	AL	HL	AL	HL	AD	HW	AW	HL	AL	HW	HL	AD	HL	AD	B	HD	AW	HL	AL	HL	AL	HL	AL	HL	AL	HW	AW	HD	AL
Beyoğlu Yeni Çarşı	HD	AD	HD	AD	HL	B	AW	HD	AW	HD	AL	HL	AL	HD	AL	HW	AW	HL	AW	AD	HW	AD	HD	AL	B	HD	AL	HD	AW	HW	AW	HD	AW	HW	AD	HW	AD	HW
Bucaspor 1928	AD	HL	AL	HL	AL	HL	B	AL	HD	AL	HL	AD	HW	AW	HL	AL	HL	AL	HL	HW	AL	HL	AL	HL	AD	B	HL	AL	HD	AD	HL	AL	HL	AL	HD	AL	HD	AW
Elazığspor	HD	B	AW	HD	AW	HL	AW	HW	AW	HL	AL	HL	AW	HL	AW	HW	AW	HL	AD	AL	B	HW	AD	HW	AL	HL	AW	HW	AD	HW	AW	HW	AW	HW	AD	HW	AW	HW
Erbaaspor	AD	HL	AW	HW	AD	HL	AL	HW	AW	HW	AW	HL	B	AL	HL	AL	HL	AL	HL	HL	AL	HW	AL	HD	AD	HL	AL	HW	AD	HD	AW	B	HW	AL	HL	AL	HD	AL
İnegölspor	AL	HW	AW	HL	AW	HL	AD	HW	AD	HW	B	AW	HW	AW	HD	AL	HL	AW	HW	HD	AW	HW	AD	HD	AL	HD	AW	HW	AD	B	HL	AD	HW	AL	HD	AW	HD	AD
İskenderunspor	AD	HW	AL	HL	AW	HL	AW	HW	AL	HW	AW	HW	AL	HW	B	AW	HL	AW	HW	HD	AD	HD	AL	HW	AL	HW	AD	HW	AW	HD	AD	HD	AL	B	HW	AL	HL	AL
Karacabey Belediyespor	HD	AL	HL	AW	HW	AL	HL	AL	HL	AW	HL	B	AD	HL	AL	HL	AD	HW	AW	AL	HL	AL	HW	DF	HD	AW	HL	AD	HW	AL	B	HW	AD	HW	AW	HD	AD	HL
Karaman	HD	AD	HL	AL	HL	AL	HL	AL	HD	AD	HW	AW	HD	B	AL	HL	AD	HD	AL	AL	HL	AL	HW	AL	HL	AD	HL	AL	HL	AL	HL	AL	B	HL	AD	HL	AL	HW
Kastamonuspor	HL	AL	HW	AW	HL	AW	HL	AL	HW	AW	HL	AW	HW	AL	HW	AW	HL	B	AD	AD	HD	AW	HD	AD	HD	AL	HW	AD	HD	AL	HL	AL	HL	AL	HD	AL	B	HL
Kepezspor	AD	HD	AL	HL	AL	HL	AW	HW	B	AL	HL	AL	HL	AL	HL	AL	HL	AD	HL	HW	AW	HL	AD	HL	AD	HL	AW	B	HD	AD	HD	AL	HL	AL	HL	AL	HL	AL
MKE Ankaragücü	HD	AL	HL	B	AW	HD	AL	HW	AD	HW	AW	HL	AL	HD	AW	HW	AW	HW	AL	AW	HD	AL	B	HW	AD	HD	AW	HW	AD	HW	AL	HW	AW	HW	AW	HL	AD	HW
Muğlaspor	B	AD	HD	AW	HW	AW	HW	AL	HW	AL	HW	AW	HW	AW	HW	AW	HD	AD	HD	B	HW	AW	HW	AW	HW	AW	HD	AD	HW	AL	HW	AD	HL	AL	HL	AW	HD	AW
Şanlıurfaspor	HW	AW	HW	AW	HD	AW	HW	AW	HL	AL	HW	AW	HL	AW	HW	B	AW	HD	AL	AW	HW	AW	HD	AD	HW	AL	HL	AL	HD	AL	HD	AL	HD	AW	B	HW	AD	HW

Home win	Away win	Win by forfeit	Home draw	Away draw	Home loss	Away loss	Defeat by forfeit	Bye

Source: TFF

== Red Group ==
=== Team informations ===
Locations of 2025–26 2. Lig Red Group teams on the map of Turkey

=== Table ===
Pos	Team	Pld	W	D	L	GF	GA	GD	Pts	Qualification or relegation
1	Bursaspor	34	25	5	4	87	19	+68	80	Promotion to TFF 1. Lig
2	Mardin 1969 (P)	34	22	5	7	67	25	+42	71	Qualification for promotion play-offs
3	Muşspor	34	21	7	6	82	35	+47	70	Qualification for promotion play-offs
4	Aliağa	34	21	6	7	81	32	+49	69	Qualification for promotion play-offs
5	Kahramanmaraş İstiklalspor	34	21	4	9	82	33	+49	67	Qualification for promotion play-offs
6	Isparta 32	34	18	9	7	70	36	+34	63	
7	Güzide Gebzespor	34	16	10	8	56	31	+25	58	
8	Menemen	34	15	6	13	57	51	+6	51	
9	Ankara Demirspor	34	14	7	13	47	47	0	49	
10	68 Aksaray Belediyespor	34	11	14	9	52	38	+14	47	
11	1461 Trabzon	34	13	8	13	54	51	+3	47	
12	Arnavutköy Belediyespor	34	13	7	14	40	36	+4	46	
13	Fethiyespor	34	11	11	12	52	41	+11	44	
14	Kırklarelispor	34	9	9	16	44	49	−5	36	
15	Somaspor	34	8	6	20	41	68	−27	30	
16	Yeni Mersin İdmanyurdu	33	4	3	26	22	97	−75	12 (Note: They had 3 points deducted and were relegated.)	Relegation to TFF 3. Lig
17	Adanaspor	34	3	1	30	17	159	−142	1 (Note: Adanaspor were 9 points deducted.)	Relegation to TFF 3. Lig
18	Yeni Malatyaspor	33	0	2	31	8	111	−103	−43 (Note: They had 45 points deducted and were relegated.)	Relegation to TFF 3. Lig

Source: TFF
Rules for classification: 1) Points; 2) Head-to-head points; 3) Head-to-head goal difference; 4) Head-to-head goals scored; 5) Goal difference; 6) Goals scored; 7) Play-off.
(P) Promoted

=== Results ===
Home \ Away	61T	68A	ADA	ALİ	AND	ARN	BUR	FET	GGE	I32	KİS	KRK	MAR	MEN	MUŞ	SOM	YMS	YMİ
1461 Trabzon		0–0	2–0	0–3	3–4	0–1	2–1	2–2	1–1	1–3	2–0	2–1	0–1	4–5	1–1	1–0	3–0*	2–2
68 Aksaray Belediyespor	1–1		5–1	1–1	2–2	0–1	1–2	0–2	3–0	2–2	3–1	0–0	0–3	2–1	1–0	1–3	3–0*	2–0
Adanaspor	0–3	0–4		1–8	0–3	0–1	0–6	0–6	0–6	0–6	1–7	0–8	2–5	0–5	2–8	0–0	3–0*	0–3
Aliağa	1–0	1–1	7–1		2–0	3–0	0–5	3–0	1–0	1–5	2–1	3–0	2–0	5–0	4–0	3–3	8–1	3–0
Ankara Demirspor	1–0	2–2	5–0	1–2		3–0	0–1	1–0	2–2	1–3	0–3	4–0	0–4	2–0	1–3	1–0	1–1	0–0
Arnavutköy Belediyespor	2–3	1–1	5–0	1–0	0–1		0–1	2–0	0–2	2–0	0–3	0–0	1–0	1–2	2–3	0–0	3–0*	3–0*
Bursaspor	1–0	6–0	6–0	0–0	4–0	3–1		3–0	2–0	0–1	2–1	4–0	2–0	3–0	2–2	5–1	3–0*	3–0
Fethiyespor	4–1	1–1	7–0	1–3	0–1	0–0	1–1		0–0	1–1	2–4	1–1	0–0	0–1	1–1	1–1	6–1	2–0
Güzide Gebzespor	2–2	1–0	7–0	1–0	2–0	1–0	4–1	1–2		1–1	1–0	1–0	1–2	1–1	1–1	0–1	3–0*	3–0*
Isparta 32	1–2	0–0	7–0	1–1	4–0	0–1	1–1	2–1	2–2		0–0	5–1	1–0	1–0	1–0	2–1	3–0*	3–0*
Kahramanmaraş İstiklalspor	4–1	2–1	6–0	2–0	2–0	1–1	0–0	4–0	1–0	2–1		3–2	0–1	3–0	2–0	6–0	2–0	5–0
Kırklarelispor	1–2	0–2	4–0	1–2	2–0	1–1	2–1	1–2	0–0	1–2	3–2		1–1	0–0	1–4	3–0	3–0*	1–1
Mardin 1969	2–1	1–0	5–0	1–0	2–2	1–0	1–2	0–0	2–2	4–0	2–1	3–0		2–1	0–3	3–0	3–0*	3–0*
Menemen	2–2	1–1	3–0	2–1	0–1	0–3	1–3	2–1	1–2	3–1	1–1	0–0	1–3		4–1	2–1	3–0*	3–0*
Muşspor	4–0	1–1	6–0	2–2	1–1	2–1	0–1	2–0	3–1	3–1	5–1	1–0	1–0	4–1		4–0	3–1	5–0
Somaspor	0–3	0–0	5–0	0–3	2–1	1–3	0–3	1–2	1–2	1–1	2–3	2–0	0–4	1–4	1–2		3–0*	3–0*
Yeni Malatyaspor	0–4	0–3*	0–3*	0–3*	0–3*	0–0	0–8	0–3*	1–4	0–3*	0–3*	0–3*	1–2	0–3*	0–3*	1–7		C
Yeni Mersin İdmanyurdu	0–3*	1–8	0–3*	0–3*	0–3*	4–3	0–1	0–3*	0–1	3–5	0–6	0–3*	0–6	1–4	0–3*	4–0	3–1	

Source: TFF
Legend: Blue = home team win; Yellow = draw; Red = away team win.

^{*} Walkover

=== Positions by round ===
Notes:The table will be adjusted retrospectively after the postponed match(es) have been played.

Team ╲ Round	1	2	3	4	5	6	7	8	9	10	11	12	13	14	15	16	17	18	19	20	21	22	23	24	25	26	27	28	29	30	31	32	33	34
Bursaspor	1	1	2	1	1	2	3	3	2	2	2	3	2	2	2	1	1	1	2	2	2	1	2	2	1	1	1	1	1	1	1	1	1	1
Mardin 1969	15	12	9	7	6	5	2	2	1	1	1	1	1	1	1	2	2	3	3	3	4	4	4	3	3	3	4	4	3	2	3	3	2	2
Muşspor	7	11	12	8	5	9	10	11	10	9	9	10	8	8	8	6	5	4	4	4	3	3	3	4	5	5	5	5	5	5	5	4	4	3
Aliağa	4	10	5	10	9	7	7	4	4	3	3	2	3	3	3	4	4	7	6	6	5	5	5	5	4	4	3	2	2	3	2	2	3	4
Kahramanmaraş İstiklalspor	12	8	13	9	7	6	6	5	6	5	6	5	4	4	4	3	3	2	1	1	1	2	1	1	2	2	2	3	4	4	4	5	5	5
Isparta 32	2	2	1	3	3	4	5	6	5	7	5	6	7	5	7	5	7	5	7	7	6	6	7	7	7	7	7	7	7	7	6	6	6	6
Güzide Gebzespor	5	3	3	2	2	1	1	1	3	4	4	4	5	6	5	8	6	8	8	8	8	8	6	6	6	6	6	6	6	6	7	7	7	7
Menemen	3	9	4	4	4	3	4	7	8	8	7	8	9	9	9	7	8	6	5	5	7	7	8	8	8	9	10	9	9	9	9	9	8	8
Ankara Demirspor	6	7	8	6	10	10	8	9	7	6	8	7	6	7	6	9	10	9	10	10	11	11	10	10	10	8	8	8	8	8	8	8	9	9
68 Aksaray Belediyespor	9	6	7	5	8	8	9	8	9	10	10	9	10	10	10	11	11	11	11	11	10	9	9	9	9	10	9	10	10	10	11	11	11	10
1461 Trabzon	8	15	10	12	11	12	14	12	13	12	13	13	11	11	11	10	9	10	9	9	9	10	11	11	11	11	11	11	11	11	10	10	10	11
Arnavutköy Belediyespor	10	5	6	11	13	14	13	14	14	13	11	11	12	12	12	12	12	12	13	12	12	12	13	13	13	13	13	13	13	13	12	13	13	12
Fethiyespor	14	14	14	13	12	11	12	10	11	11	12	12	14	14	14	14	14	14	14	14	14	13	12	12	12	12	12	12	12	12	13	12	12	13
Kırklarelispor	11	4	11	14	14	13	11	13	12	14	14	14	13	13	13	13	13	13	12	13	13	14	14	14	14	14	14	14	14	14	14	14	14	14
Somaspor	13	13	15	15	15	15	15	15	15	15	16	16	16	16	16	16	16	16	15	15	15	15	15	15	15	15	15	15	15	15	15	15	15	15
Yeni Mersin İdmanyurdu	16	16	16	16	16	16	16	16	16	16	15	15	15	15	15	15	15	15	16	16	16	16	16	16	16	16	16	16	16	16	16	16	16	16
Adanaspor	17	17	17	17	17	17	17	17	17	17	17	17	17	17	17	17	17	17	17	17	17	17	17	17	17	17	17	17	17	17	17	17	17	17
Yeni Malatyaspor	18	18	18	18	18	18	18	18	18	18	18	18	18	18	18	18	18	18	18	18	18	18	18	18	18	18	18	18	18	18	18	18	18	18

2026–27 1. Lig	Play-off	2026–27 3. Lig

Source: TFF

=== Results by round ===
Team ╲ Round	1	2	3	4	5	6	7	8	9	10	11	12	13	14	15	16	17	18	19	20	21	22	23	24	25	26	27	28	29	30	31	32	33	34
1461 Trabzon	HD	AL	HW	AD	HD	AL	HL	AW	HL	AW	AL	HD	AW	HW	AW	HW	AD	AD	HW	AL	HD	AL	HL	AL	HW	AL	WF	HD	WF	HL	AW	HL	AW	HL
68 Aksaray Belediyespor	AD	HW	AD	HW	AD	HD	AD	HW	HL	AL	HW	AD	HL	AD	HL	AD	WF	HD	AW	HL	AW	HD	AW	HW	AD	AL	HW	AL	HL	AL	HD	AD	HD	WF
Adanaspor	HL	AL	HL	AL	HL	AL	HL	AL	HL	AL	HD	AL	WF	AL	HL	AL	HL	AL	HL	AL	HL	AL	HL	AL	HL	AL	HL	AL	HL	WF	HL	WF	HL	AL
Aliağa	HW	AL	HW	AL	HW	AW	AD	HW	AW	HW	AL	HW	AD	HW	AL	HD	AD	AL	HW	AW	HW	AW	HD	HW	WF	HW	WF	HW	AW	HL	AW	HW	AD	HL
Ankara Demirspor	HW	AD	AD	HW	AL	HD	AW	HD	AW	HW	AL	HW	AW	HD	AL	HL	AL	AW	HL	HL	AL	HL	WF	HW	WF	HW	AW	HL	AL	HW	AD	HL	AL	HD
Arnavutköy Belediyespor	HD	AW	HD	AL	HL	AL	HW	AL	HL	AW	HW	AD	HL	AL	HL	HW	AW	AD	HL	AW	HL	AD	HL	AD	HW	AL	HD	AL	WF	AW	WF	AL	AW	HW
Bursaspor	AW	HW	AW	HW	AW	HL	AL	HW	AW	HD	HW	AL	HW	AW	HW	AW	HD	WF	AL	HW	AW	HW	AD	HW	AW	HW	AW	AD	HW	AD	HW	AW	HW	AW
Fethiyespor	AL	HD	AL	HW	AD	HW	AL	HW	AL	HD	AL	HD	AL	HL	HD	AL	HD	HL	AW	HL	WF	HW	WF	HD	AW	HD	AW	HL	AW	HD	AL	AW	HD	AD
Güzide Gebzespor	AW	HW	AW	HD	AW	HW	AW	HD	AD	HD	AL	HW	AL	HD	AD	AD	HW	HL	AL	WF	AD	WF	AW	HW	AD	HW	AW	HW	AL	HW	AL	HL	HL	AD
Isparta 32	AW	HW	HW	AL	HD	AW	HD	AD	HW	AL	HW	AD	HD	WF	HL	AW	HL	HW	AL	AW	HW	AD	HD	AL	HD	AD	HW	AW	HW	AW	WF	AW	WF	AL
Kahramanmaraş İstiklalspor	AL	HW	AL	HW	AW	HW	AD	HW	AD	HW	AL	HW	HW	AW	HL	AW	HW	HW	WF	HW	AW	HD	AW	HW	AL	HW	AL	HD	AL	AL	HW	AL	HW	AW
Kırklarelispor	AD	HW	AL	HL	HD	AD	HW	AL	HD	AD	HD	AL	HW	AL	WF	AL	HD	HD	AW	HL	AL	AD	HL	AL	HW	AL	HL	AL	HW	AL	HL	WF	HL	WF
Mardin 1969	AL	HD	AW	HW	AW	HW	AW	HW	AW	HW	AD	HW	AW	HL	AW	HD	AD	HL	AW	HW	AL	WF	AW	WF	AL	HW	AL	HW	AW	HW	AL	HW	AW	HD
Menemen	AW	HL	AW	HW	AD	HW	HD	AL	HD	AD	HW	AL	HL	AW	HW	WF	HD	WF	AW	HW	AL	HD	AL	AL	HL	AL	HL	AW	HL	AL	HW	AL	WF	AW
Muşspor	HW	AL	HD	AW	HW	AL	HD	AL	HW	AD	HW	AL	HW	AD	AW	HW	AW	AW	HW	AW	HW	AW	HW	AL	HD	WF	HL	AD	HW	WF	HW	HW	AD	HW
Somaspor	HL	AD	HL	AL	AL	HL	AW	HL	AL	HL	AD	HD	AL	HL	AW	HL	AL	AW	HL	AL	HW	HL	AD	WF	AL	WF	AD	HW	AL	HW	AL	HD	AL	HL
Yeni Malatyaspor	HL	AL	HL	AL	HL	AD	HL	AL	AL	HL	AL	HD	DF	DF	DF	DF	DF	DF	DF	DF	DF	DF	DF	DF	DF	DF	DF		DF	DF	DF	DF	DF	DF
Yeni Mersin İdmanyurdu	HL	AL	HL	AL	HL	AL	HL	AD	HW	AL	HW	AD	AL	HW	AW	HL	AD	DF	HL	AL	HL	DF	DF	DF	DF	DF	DF		DF	DF	DF	DF	DF	DF

Home win	Away win	Win by forfeit	Home draw	Away draw	Home loss	Away loss	Defeat by forfeit	Bye

Source: TFF

== Promotion Playoffs ==
=== Bracket ===
Semifinals
W5	Şanlıurfaspor	0	1	1
W2	Muğlaspor	1	1	2
White Group
W4	Adana 01	2	1	3
W3	Elazığspor	4	2	6
R5	Kahramanmaraş İstiklalspor	0	0	0 (5)
R2	Mardin 1969 (p)	0	0	0 (6)
Red Group
R4	Aliağa	1	0	1 (5)
R3	Muşspor (p)	1	0	1 (6)

Finals
W2	Muğlaspor (p)	0 (8)
W3	Elazığspor	0 (7)
R2	Mardin 1969	2
R3	Muşspor	1
