= 68 Yeni Aksarayspor =

Turkish football club

- Full name: 68 Yeni Aksarayspor
- Founded: 1997
- Dissolved: 2016; 10 years ago
- Ground: Dağılgan Stadium, Aksaray
- Capacity: 500
- Chairman: Volkan Kantaş
- Manager: İsa Doğan
- League: TFF 2. Lig
- 2025–26: TFF 2. Lig, Red, 10th of 18
Home colours	Away colours

68 Yeni Aksarayspor with club code 011738 was a football club located in Aksaray, Turkey. The team lost its Turkish Regional Amateur League play-out game 3-5 on penalties after a 0-0 draw against 68 Aksaray Belediyespor.

== Stadium ==
The home ground was the Dağılgan Stadium which has a capacity for 500 spectators.

== League participations ==
- TFF 3. Lig: 2013-2015
- Turkish Regional Amateur League: 2010-2013, 2015-2016
- Aksaray Amateur First Division: 1997-2010
