= Beyoğlu Yeni Çarşı S.F. =

Beyoğlu Yeni Çarşıspor
- Full name: Beyoğlu Yeni Çarşı Spor Kulübü
- Founded: 1954
- Ground: Maltepe Hasan Polat Stadium, Istanbul
- Capacity: 5,000
- Chairman: Ahmet Karadeniz
- League: TFF 2. Lig
- 2025–26: TFF 2. Lig, White, 9th of 19
Home colours	Away colours

Beyoğlu Yeni Çarşı FK is a Turkish professional football club located in the Beyoğlu district of Istanbul. They currently play in the TFF Third League.

== History ==
Halide Edip Adıvar Spor Kulübü, which appeared in local tournaments in the 1990s, became the Istanbul's Şişli with the purchase of the Kasımpaşa Harb-İş Dikimevi team in 2004. It was officially established in the Halide Edip Adıvar neighbourhood. The name of the club was determined as "Halide Edip Adıvar Spor Kulübü" and the colors as "red-white". Kenan Demirtaş was the first club president. Having competed in the 2nd Amateur in its first year, HEASK was entitled to play in the 1st Amateur Division in its 2nd year.

After the management change and restructuring in the 2009–2010 season, HEASK completed its group as the champion and qualified to play in the Super Amateur Leagues.

In the 2012–2013 season, he finished the regular season in the 1st place in the Istanbul Super Amateur League and the Play-Off group in the 3rd place and was promoted to the Regional Amateur League.

In the 2013–2014 season, the team that took the first 2 places will be entitled to play 2 play-off matches in order to be promoted to the 3rd League Regional Amateur League 11th Group, after Edirnespor Youth Club. Matching with Sorgun Belediyespor first in the play-off matches, HEASK eliminated their opponent 3–2 on penalties in the match with regular time and extra time ending 1-1, In the match, which was matched with Arnavutköy Belediyespor and the regular time ended 2-2 and the overtime ended 3-3, they eliminated their opponent 5–3 on penalties 3. League.

In the 2014–15 season, it finished its group in the 16th place in the 3rd League and relegated to the BAL from the 3rd League.

The club, which started to compete in the Regional Amateur League again in the 2015–2016 season, became the champion in the BAL 8th Group and lost its first play-off match against Afjet Afyonspor, but lost 2–0 in its second play-off against Sarayönü Belediyespor. After winning the off game 2–0, they were promoted to the 3rd League again.

[[2018-19 League 3#3. In the season that started with Halide Edip Adıvar Cemil Yücel in Group|2018-19 3rd League 3rd group]], after the 11th week, she competed in the league under the management of Erman Güracar. In 34 games, they had 11 wins, 13 draws and 10 losses. He finished 9th in his group by collecting 46 points.

Before the 2021–2022 season, the club changed its name to Beyoğlu Yeni Çarşı Football Club and changed its colors to blue and white.

== Achievements ==
- Turkish Regional Amateur League

'Championship (2):' 2013–14, 2015–16

- Amateur League

'Istanbul SAL Championship (1):' 2012-13

'Istanbul 1st Amateur Championship (1):' 2011-12

'Istanbul 2nd Amateur Championship (1):' 2004-05

== League challenges ==
- TFF Third League: 7 season

2014–2015, 2016-

- Turkish Regional Amateur League: 2 seasons

2013–2014, 2015-2016

- Amateur League: 16 seasons

1997-2013

== Performance in past seasons ==
League Level	League	Season		Exposure.	Match	G	B	M	NETWORK	YG	P	Cup	Top Scorer	Technical Director
7	Istanbul: 1. Amateur	2009-10		1.	18	14	2	2	50	12	44	-	?	?
6	Istanbul SAL	2010-11	NS	1.	20	14	4	2	40	10	46	-	?	?
6	Istanbul SAL	2010-11	PO	8.	15	6	5	4	25	18	23	-	?	?
6	Istanbul SAL	2011-12	NS	1.	24	21	2	1	60	12	65	-	?	?
6	Istanbul SAL	2011-12	PO	9.	14	6	2	6	20	13	20	-	?	?
6	Istanbul SAL	2012-13	NS	1.	24	19	4	1	69	19	61	-	?	?
6	Istanbul SAL	2012-13	PO	3.	11	6	2	3	19	10	20	-	?	?
5	BAL	2013-14	NS	2.	26	18	6	2	51	14	60	-	Tayfun Çakal (9)	Metin Akçiçek / Muttalip Şimşek
5	BAL	2013-14	PO	Ş	2	0	2	0	4	4	2	-	Tayfun Çakal (9)	Metin Akçiçek / Muttalip Şimşek
4	3. Lig	2014-15		16.	34	9	5	20	32	54	32	1. Tur	Tayfun Çakal (6)	Zeki Ersoy
5	BAL	2015-16	NS	1.	26	17	7	2	43	13	58	-	Hüseyin Akbaş (7)	Adnan Toros
5	BAL	2015-16	PO	Ş	2	1	0	1	2	2	3	-	Hüseyin Akbaş (7)	Adnan Toros
4	3. Lig	2016-17		7.	34	15	8	11	46	39	53	2. Tur	Taner Gürsoy (12)	Hakan Çobanoğlu / Sacit Serkan Erok / Mehmet Yorulmazlar
4	3. Lig	2017-18		7.	34	13	12	9	45	33	51	2. Tur	Aytek Aşıkoğlu (11)	Kamil Erdem / Metin Yıldız / Kenan Öztürk
4	3. Lig	2018-19		9.	34	11	13	10	40	40	46	2. Tur	Emre Turan (11)	Cemil Yücel / Özay Başpınar / Erman Güraçar
4	3. Lig	2019-20		11.	28	8	11	9	22	30	35	2. Tur	Fevzi Can Bozkuş (8)	Algun Erdem / Erman Güraçar
4	3. Lig	2020-21		6.	32	12	13	7	41	36	49	1. Tur	Said Can Açıkalın (10)	Hakan Çobanoğlu
4	3. Lig	2021-22												
