= Kırklarelispor =

Turkish sports club

- Full name: Kırklarelispor Kulübü
- Nickname: Kırklar
- Founded: 1968
- Ground: Kırklareli Atatürk Stadium, Kırklareli
- Capacity: 3,750
- Chairman: Volkan Can
- Manager: Bilgin Erdem
- League: TFF 2. Lig
- 2025–26: TFF 2. Lig, Red, 14th of 18
- Website: http://www.kırklarelispor.com
Home colours	Away colours	Third colours

Kırklarelispor is a Turkish sports club founded in 1968 is currently playing in the TFF Second League. The club's colours are green and white. They play their home matches at the Kırklareli Atatürk Stadium.

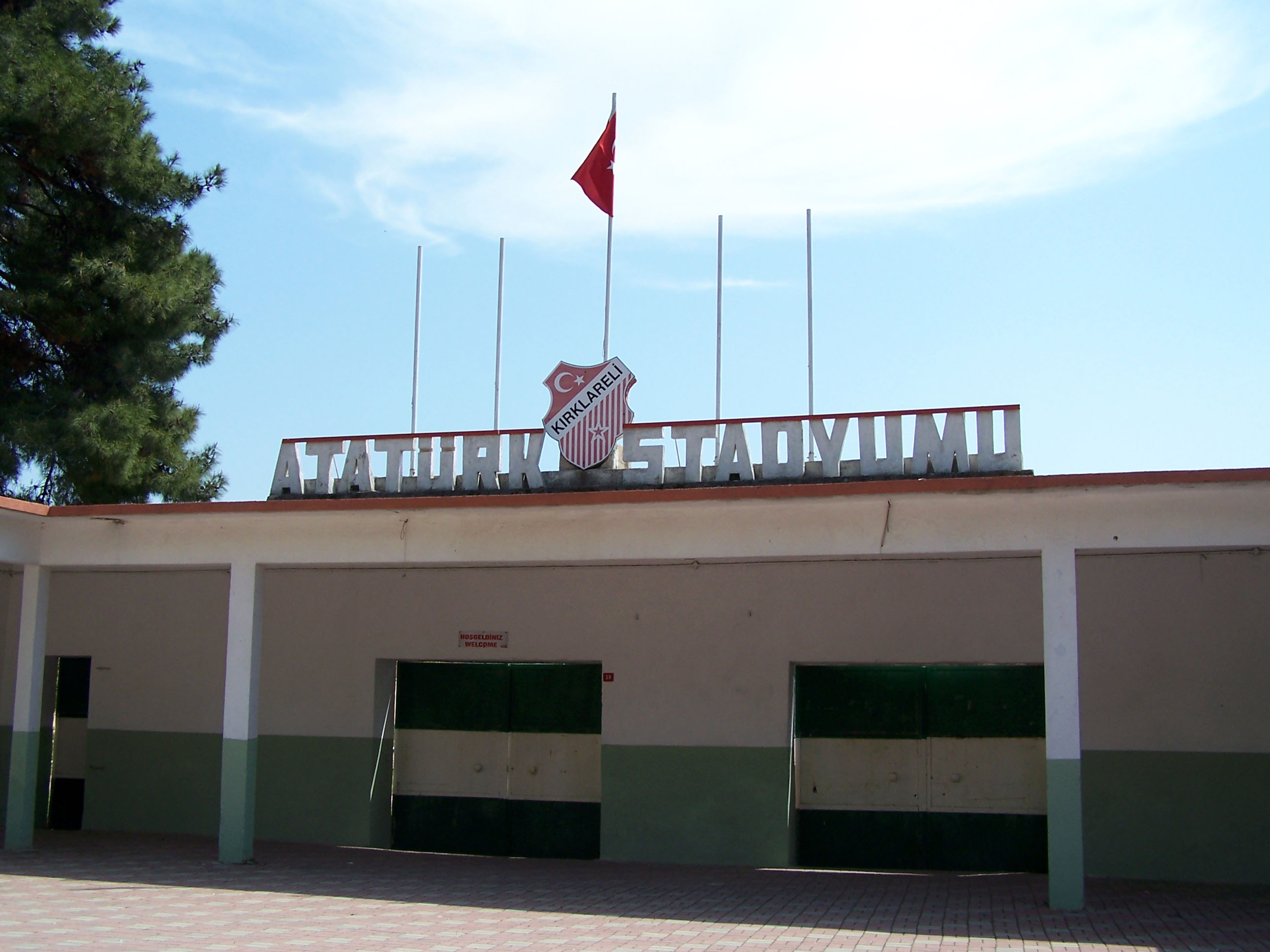
Atatürk Stadium

== Current squad ==
As of 7 December 2025

Note: Flags indicate national team as defined under FIFA eligibility rules; some limited exceptions apply. Players may hold more than one non-FIFA nationality.

No.	Pos.	Nation	Player
1	GK	TUR	Mehmet Cinpir
3	DF	TUR	Poyraz Gelen (on loan from Beşiktaş)
4	DF	TUR	Yağız Dilek (on loan from İstanbul Başakşehir)
5	DF	TUR	Miraç Acer (on loan from Amed)
7	MF	BEL	Massis Gülük
8	MF	TUR	Semih Üstün
9	FW	TUR	Cemil Devrim
10	DF	TUR	Ayberk Kaygısız
11	FW	TUR	Muhammet Akpınar
12	DF	TUR	Oğuzhan Çapar
14	MF	TUR	Ömer Faruk Yücel
16	FW	TUR	Furkan Güneş
17	MF	TUR	Ahmet Emre Uzun
19	MF	TUR	Şükür Toğrak
20	MF	AZE	Serhat Tasdemir
21	MF	TUR	Yiğit Can Korkmaz

No.	Pos.	Nation	Player
22	MF	TUR	Altuğ Taş
23	GK	TUR	Anıl Demir
24	DF	TUR	Rüzgar Derici
25	DF	TUR	Erkam Kömür (on loan from Göztepe)
28	FW	TUR	Emre Mücahit Şahin
30	DF	TUR	Erdoğan Kaya
35	FW	TUR	Rüzgar Dugalı
39	FW	TUR	Emre Balkı
41	MF	TUR	Eslem Öztürk
42	FW	TUR	Mehmet Ali Büyüksayar (on loan from Konyaspor)
47	MF	TUR	Hozan Harman
61	MF	GER	Ertugrul Tuysuz
66	FW	TUR	Metehan Mertöz
77	FW	TUR	Melih Okutan
80	MF	TUR	Bilal Ayaz İnel
88	DF	TUR	Berkay Sizer

=== Out on loan ===
Note: Flags indicate national team as defined under FIFA eligibility rules; some limited exceptions apply. Players may hold more than one non-FIFA nationality.

No.	Pos.	Nation	Player
—	FW	TUR	Berke Can Özsoy (at Edirnespor until 30 June 2026)
