= Kastamonuspor 1966 =

Turkish football club

- Full name: Kastamonuspor 1966 Spor Kulübü
- Founded: 1942 (as Tosya Belediyespor); 2014 (as Kastamonuspor 1966)
- Ground: Kastamonu Gazi Stadium
- Capacity: 4,033
- President: Baki Cengiz Aygün
- Manager: Ergin Keleş
- League: TFF 2. Lig
- 2025–26: TFF 2. Lig, White, 12th of 19
Home colours	Away colours	Third colours

Kastamonuspor 1966, known as GMG Kastamonuspor due to sponsorship reasons, is a Turkish sports club located in Kastamonu. The football team currently plays in the TFF Second League.

== Current squad ==
As of 1 October 2026

Note: Flags indicate national team as defined under FIFA eligibility rules; some limited exceptions apply. Players may hold more than one non-FIFA nationality.

No.	Pos.	Nation	Player
1	GK	TUR	Deniz Çörtlen
4	DF	TUR	İsmail Hasan Bakkal
7	FW	TUR	Doruk Paflak
8	MF	TUR	Oğuz Duman
9	FW	TUR	Ahmethan Köse
10	FW	TUR	Ahmet Yazar
14	MF	TUR	Arda Rahan
15	MF	TUR	Yasin Hızar
17	MF	TUR	Necati Bilgiç
18	MF	TUR	Samet Tarık Güler
20	DF	TUR	Emir Açıkgöz
24	MF	TUR	Kerim Temizkan
27	FW	TUR	Serdar Avkaroğlu
29	MF	TUR	Ümeyir Musa Yıldırım

No.	Pos.	Nation	Player
31	GK	TUR	Kerem Çavdar
32	DF	TUR	Gökmen Özince
37	DF	TUR	Erdem Reis
47	DF	TUR	Arda Dutar
55	MF	TUR	Deniz Güngör
58	DF	TUR	Ögeday Hadi Uyanık
66	MF	TUR	Yasin Başaytaç
77	FW	TUR	Mert Çalışkan
88	MF	TUR	Niyazi Kılıç
91	DF	TUR	Enes Demirci
94	FW	TUR	Ali Çardak
99	FW	TUR	Rıdvan Tekkeşin
-	GK	TUR	Halil Kerem Kabakulak
-	MF	GER	Burak Asik

=== Out on loan ===
Note: Flags indicate national team as defined under FIFA eligibility rules; some limited exceptions apply. Players may hold more than one non-FIFA nationality.

No. / Pos. / Nation / Player	No. / Pos. / Nation / Player
