= İnegölspor =

Turkish sports club

- Full name: İnegölspor
- Founded: 1954
- Ground: İnegöl İlçe Stadium, Bursa
- Capacity: 4,000
- Chairman: Kani Ademoğlu
- Manager: Cüneyt Biçer
- League: TFF 2. Lig
- 2025–26: TFF 2. Lig, White, 7th of 19
- Website: http://inegolspor.org.tr/
Home colours	Away colours

İnegölspor is a Turkish sports club located in İnegöl, Bursa Province. The football team currently plays in the TFF Second League. The club also played in the old Second League between 1985–1993 and 1996–1997.

== Current squad ==
As of 5 December 2025

Note: Flags indicate national team as defined under FIFA eligibility rules; some limited exceptions apply. Players may hold more than one non-FIFA nationality.

No.	Pos.	Nation	Player
1	GK	TUR	Bekir Sevgi
3	DF	TUR	Muratcan Tutal
4	DF	TUR	Ahmet Özkaya
5	DF	TUR	İbrahim Sürgülü
6	MF	TUR	Mustafa Mete Tetik
7	FW	TUR	Taner Gümüş
8	MF	TUR	Kerem Dönertaş
9	FW	GER	Yasin Ozan
10	MF	TUR	Özcan Aydın
15	MF	AUT	Efekan Karayazi
16	DF	TUR	Mete Sevinç
17	FW	TUR	Taha Recep Cebeci
18	MF	TUR	Hüseyin Afkan

No.	Pos.	Nation	Player
20	DF	GER	Orhan Aktaş
22	DF	TUR	Ruhan Arda Aksoy
23	DF	TUR	Behzat Taha Dede
25	MF	TUR	Emre Keleşoğlu
30	GK	TUR	Emre Şeker
34	MF	TUR	Yusuf Tursun
40	GK	TUR	Yusuf Alper Demirtaş
58	FW	TUR	Ozan Can Dursun
66	DF	TUR	Yücel Candemir
77	DF	TUR	Enes Yılmaz
99	FW	TUR	Hasan Alp Altınoluk
—	GK	TUR	Fatih Gülmez

=== Out on loan ===
Note: Flags indicate national team as defined under FIFA eligibility rules; some limited exceptions apply. Players may hold more than one non-FIFA nationality.

No.	Pos.	Nation	Player
—	FW	TUR	Bilal Gündoğdu (at Diyarbekirspor until 30 June 2026)
