= Somaspor =

Turkish football club

- Full name: Soma Spor Kulübü
- Founded: 1985; 41 years ago
- Ground: Soma Atatürk Stadium
- Capacity: 3,500
- Chairman: Mustafa Aydın
- Coach: Burhanettin Basatemür
- League: TFF 2. Lig
- 2025–26: TFF 2. Lig, Red, 15th of 18
- Website: http://www.somaspor.org.tr/
Home colours	Away colours

Soma Spor Kulübü, colloquially known as Somaspor, is a Turkish professional football club located in Manisa. The club competes at TFF Second League as of 2021–22 season.

== Team records ==
=== League affiliation ===
- TFF Second League: 2021–
- TFF Third League: 2019–2021
- Turkish Regional Amateur League: 2013–2019
- Super Amateur Leagues: 2005–2013

== Honours ==
- TFF Third League
  - Winner: 2020–21
- Turkish Regional Amateur League
  - Winners: 2018–19
- Super Amateur Leagues
  - Manisa Süper Amateur League winners: 2007–08, 2012–13

== Current squad ==
As of 8 December 2025

Note: Flags indicate national team as defined under FIFA eligibility rules; some limited exceptions apply. Players may hold more than one non-FIFA nationality.

No.	Pos.	Nation	Player
1	GK	TUR	Eran Şenol
3	DF	TUR	Bilal Selamet
5	MF	TUR	Ferit Bay Gündüz
7	DF	TUR	Berk Çetin
8	MF	TUR	Enes Yetkin
9	FW	SWE	Ömür Pektas
10	MF	TUR	Emir Şenocak
11	FW	TUR	Enes Keskin
13	FW	TUR	Mert Polat Keklik
17	DF	TUR	Serkan Yola
20	MF	TUR	Mehmet Gündüz
23	FW	TUR	Mustafa Taner Tamer
24	FW	TUR	Erdem Özcan

No.	Pos.	Nation	Player
25	GK	TUR	Batuhan Ataç
27	MF	TUR	Mustafa Doğru
33	DF	TUR	Eniscan Atik
41	MF	TUR	Berke Kayar
45	MF	TUR	İbrahim Semih Apaydın
54	DF	TUR	Bahadır Yağız
66	DF	TUR	Arda Kutluer
97	DF	GER	Dervis Erkan
99	GK	TUR	Yusuf Taha Emir
-	GK	TUR	Yiğithan Kır
-	DF	TUR	Yağız Aydın
-	FW	TUR	Zeki Saki
