= 2015–16 TFF Third League =

TFF Third League
- Season: 2015–16
- Champions: Erzurum BŞB; Etimesgut Bld. Kastamonuspor
- Promoted: Erzurum BŞB; Etimesgut Bld. Kastamonuspor; Zonguldak Kömürspor; Ofspor; Niğde Belediyespor
- Relegated: Arsinspor; Gölbaşıspor; Turgutluspor; Kahramanmaraş BB; Zara Belediyespor; Ayvalıkgücü Bld. Gaziosmanpaşa; Körfez İskenderunspor; TKİ Tavşanlı Linyitspor; Çine Madranspor; Sandıklıspor

The 2015–16 Third League (known as the Spor Toto 3. Lig for sponsorship reasons) is the 15th season of the league since its establishment in 2001 as the fourth level division; and the 45th season of the third league in Turkish football since its establishment in 1967–68.

== Group 1 ==
=== Teams ===
Locations of teams in 2015–16 TFF Third League

=== League table ===
Pos	Team	Pld	W	D	L	GF	GA	GD	Pts	Qualification or relegation
1	Erzurum B.B. (P)	35	21	8	6	64	32	+32	71	Promotion to 2. Lig
2	Kızılcabölükspor	35	19	8	8	49	34	+15	65	Qualification for Promotion Playoffs
3	Tirespor 1922	35	17	9	9	50	38	+12	60	Qualification for Promotion Playoffs
4	Zonguldakspor (P)	35	17	6	12	52	42	+10	57	Qualification for Promotion Playoffs
5	Birlik Nakliyat Düzyurtspor	35	14	15	6	43	34	+9	57	Qualification for Promotion Playoffs
6	Erzin Belediyespor	35	15	10	10	52	37	+15	55	
7	Yeşil Bursa	35	14	11	10	44	32	+12	53	
8	Tekirdağspor	35	12	8	15	41	44	−3	44	
9	Kırıkhanspor	35	12	8	15	32	40	−8	44	
10	Maltepe	35	9	16	10	35	31	+4	43	
11	Altay	35	9	15	11	42	45	−3	42	
12	Bursa Nilüfer S.A.Ş.	35	10	12	13	34	46	−12	42	
13	Düzcespor	35	8	17	10	38	47	−9	41	
14	Silivrispor	35	12	4	19	33	41	−8	40	
15	Kozan Belediyespor	35	10	9	16	41	52	−11	39	
16	Arsinspor (R)	35	10	9	16	35	47	−12	39	Relegation to Turkish Regional Amateur League
17	Gölbaşıspor A.Ş. (R)	35	9	8	18	33	49	−16	35	Relegation to Turkish Regional Amateur League
18	Turgutluspor (R)	35	9	8	18	30	48	−18	35	Relegation to Turkish Regional Amateur League
19	Cizrespor	18	3	7	8	16	25	−9	16	Relegation to Turkish Regional Amateur League

Updated to match(es) played on 30 April 2016. Source: TFF
Rules for classification: 1) points; 2) goal difference; 3) number of goals scored.
(P) Promoted; (R) Relegated

=== Promotion Playoffs ===
==== Semifinals ====
Team 1	Agg.	Team 2	1st leg	2nd leg
Birlik Nakliyat Düzyurtspor	0–1	Kızılcabölükspor	0–0	0–1
Zonguldak Kömürspor	4–1	Tirespor 1922	2–1	2–0

==== Finals ====
Team 1	Score	Team 2
Kızılcabölükspor	1–2	Zonguldak Kömürspor

== Group 2 ==
=== Teams ===
Locations of teams in 2015–16 TFF Third League

=== League table ===
Pos	Team	Pld	W	D	L	GF	GA	GD	Pts	Qualification or relegation
1	Etimesgut Belediyespor (P)	36	20	10	6	51	26	+25	70	Promotion to 2. Lig
2	Diyarbekirspor	36	17	10	9	40	26	+14	61	Qualification for Promotion Playoffs
3	Bodrumspor	36	17	9	10	48	23	+25	60	Qualification for Promotion Playoffs
4	Ofspor A.Ş. (P)	36	16	10	10	43	28	+15	58	Qualification for Promotion Playoffs
5	Ankara Adliyespor	36	15	12	9	43	34	+9	57	Qualification for Promotion Playoffs
6	Orhangazispor	36	14	12	10	40	32	+8	54	
7	Kemer Tekirovaspor	36	15	8	13	60	45	+15	53	
8	Sancaktepe Belediyespor	36	15	6	15	43	46	−3	51	
9	Denizli Belediyespor	36	14	8	14	42	39	+3	50	
10	Derincespor	36	13	10	13	35	42	−7	49	
11	Sultanbeyli Belediyespor	36	13	10	13	33	31	+2	49	
12	Sakaryaspor	36	11	15	10	36	42	−6	48	
13	Yomraspor	36	13	8	15	39	48	−9	47	
14	Payas Belediyespor 1975	36	11	13	12	38	39	−1	46	
15	Manisa BB	36	12	10	14	37	40	−3	46	
16	Kahramanmaraş BB (R)	36	10	12	14	33	37	−4	42	Relegation to Turkish Regional Amateur League
17	Zara Belediyespor (R)	36	9	6	21	26	49	−23	33	Relegation to Turkish Regional Amateur League
18	Ayvalıkgücü Belediyespor (R)	36	7	12	17	40	64	−24	33	Relegation to Turkish Regional Amateur League
19	Gaziosmanpaşa S.K. (R)	36	6	7	23	30	66	−36	25	Relegation to Turkish Regional Amateur League

Updated to match(es) played on 30 April 2016. Source: TFF
Rules for classification: 1) points; 2) goal difference; 3) number of goals scored.
(P) Promoted; (R) Relegated

=== Promotion Playoffs ===
==== Semifinals ====
Team 1	Agg.	Team 2	1st leg	2nd leg
Adliyespor	0–6	Diyarbekirspor	0–3	0–3
Ofspor	2–2 (a)	Bodrum Belediyesi Bodrumspor	1–0	1–2

==== Finals ====
Team 1	Score	Team 2
Diyarbekirspor	1–1 (4–5 pen.)	Ofspor

== Group 3 ==
=== Teams ===
Locations of teams in 2015–16 TFF Third League

=== League table ===
Pos	Team	Pld	W	D	L	GF	GA	GD	Pts	Qualification or relegation
1	Kastamonuspor (P)	36	22	8	6	59	31	+28	74	Promotion to 2. Lig
2	Bayburt Grup Özel İdarespor	36	18	7	11	37	26	+11	61	Qualification for Promotion Playoffs
3	Niğde Belediyespor (P)	36	17	10	9	52	34	+18	61	Qualification for Promotion Playoffs
4	Çorum Belediyespor	36	18	5	13	47	36	+11	59	Qualification for Promotion Playoffs
5	Beylerbeyi S.K.	36	17	8	11	45	37	+8	59	Qualification for Promotion Playoffs
6	Gölcükspor	36	16	10	10	43	33	+10	58	
7	Darıca Gençlerbirliği	36	13	15	8	50	36	+14	54	
8	Erzincan Refahiyespor	36	11	21	4	42	30	+12	54	
9	Dersimspor	36	13	12	11	40	44	−4	51	
10	Çanakkale Dardanelspor	36	14	7	15	45	38	+7	49	
11	Çatalcaspor	36	10	17	9	37	33	+4	47	
12	Batman Petrolspor	36	13	8	15	37	42	−5	47	
13	Manavgatspor	36	11	11	14	50	52	−2	44	
14	Bergama Belediyespor	36	11	9	16	39	46	−7	42	
15	Van BB	36	10	12	14	33	46	−13	42	
16	Körfez İskenderunspor (R)	36	9	13	14	37	55	−18	40	Relegation to Turkish Regional Amateur League
17	TKİ Tavşanlı Linyitspor (R)	36	9	7	20	31	44	−13	34	Relegation to Turkish Regional Amateur League
18	Çine Madranspor (R)	36	7	10	19	27	48	−21	31	Relegation to Turkish Regional Amateur League
19	Sandıklıspor (R)	36	5	6	25	35	75	−40	21	Relegation to Turkish Regional Amateur League

Updated to match(es) played on 1 May 2016. Source: TFF
Rules for classification: 1) points; 2) goal difference; 3) number of goals scored.
(P) Promoted; (R) Relegated

=== Promotion Playoffs ===
==== Semifinals ====
Team 1	Agg.	Team 2	1st leg	2nd leg
Beylerbeyi	4–3	Bayburt Grup Özel İdarespor	3–0	1–3
Çorum Belediyespor	3–4	Niğde Belediyespor	1–1	2–3

==== Finals ====
Team 1	Score	Team 2
Beylerbeyi	0–0 (1–4 pen.)	Niğde Belediyespor

== See also ==
- 2015–16 Turkish Cup
- 2015–16 Süper Lig
- 2015–16 TFF First League
- 2015–16 TFF Second League
