= 2014–15 TFF Third League =

TFF Third League
- Season: 2014–15
- Champions: Tuzlaspor; Eyüpspor; Anadolu Üsküdar 1908
- Promoted: Tuzlaspor; Eyüpspor; Anadolu Üsküdar 1908; İstanbulspor; Sivas Dört Eylül Belediyespor; Ankara Demirspor
- Relegated: Tutap Şekerspor; Sebat Proje Trabzon Akçaabat; Bozüyükspor; Halide Edip Adıvar SK; 68 Yeni Aksarayspor; Çankırı Belediyespor; FBM Yaşamspor; Kayseri Şekerspor; İst. Güngören

The 2014–15 TFF Third League (also known as Spor-Toto Third League due to sponsorship reasons) is the 14th season of the league since its establishment in 2001 as the fourth level division; and the 44th season of the third league in Turkish football since its establishment in 1967–68 (before 2001 league was played as third level division).

== Group 1 ==
=== Teams ===
Locations of teams in 2014–15 TFF Third League

=== League table ===
Pos	Team	Pld	W	D	L	GF	GA	GD	Pts	Qualification or relegation
1	Tuzlaspor (C, P)	34	21	11	2	73	33	+40	74	Promotion to 2. Lig
2	Darıca Gençlerbirliği	34	19	11	4	50	23	+27	68	Qualification for Promotion Playoffs
3	Zonguldak Kömürspor	34	17	12	5	50	24	+26	63	Qualification for Promotion Playoffs
4	İstanbulspor A.Ş. (P)	34	17	10	7	53	23	+30	61	Qualification for Promotion Playoffs
5	Çorum Belediyespor	34	14	14	6	44	36	+8	56	Qualification for Promotion Playoffs
6	Bursa Nilüfer S.A.Ş.	34	12	18	4	45	26	+19	54	
7	Kızılcabölükspor	34	14	11	9	50	35	+15	53	
8	Tirespor 1922	33	15	6	12	53	39	+14	51	
9	Ankara Adliyespor	34	12	12	10	50	39	+11	48	
10	Niğde Belediyespor	34	12	11	11	44	40	+4	47	
11	Çatalcaspor	34	12	9	13	34	32	+2	45	
12	Batman Petrolspor	34	12	8	14	40	41	−1	44	
13	Manavgatspor	34	12	8	14	42	38	+4	44	
14	Kırıkhanspor	34	11	11	12	41	34	+7	44	
15	Gaziosmanpaşa S.K.	34	9	9	16	39	46	−7	36	
16	Tutap Şekerspor (R)	33	4	7	22	23	68	−45	19	Relegation to Turkish Regional Amateur League
17	Trabzon Akçaabat FK (R)	33	4	6	23	15	70	−55	15 (Note: 3 points deducted)	Relegation to Turkish Regional Amateur League
18	Bozüyükspor (R)	33	0	0	33	0	99	−99	0	Relegation to Turkish Regional Amateur League

Updated to match(es) played on 10 May 2015. Source: TFF
Rules for classification: 1) points; 2) goal difference; 3) number of goals scored.
(C) Champions; (P) Promoted; (R) Relegated

=== Promotion Playoffs ===
==== Semifinals ====
Team 1	Agg.	Team 2	1st leg	2nd leg
Çorum Belediyespor	2–0	Darıca GB	0–0	2–0
İstanbulspor	1–1 (a)	Zonguldak Kömürspor	0–0	1–1

===== First legs =====
14 May 2015	Çorum Belediyespor	0–0	Darıca GB	Dr. Turhan Kılıççıoğlu Stadium
16:30 CET+3		Report		Attendance: 0 Referee: Mesut Carık

14 May 2015	İstanbulspor	0–0	Zonguldak Kömürspor	Bahçelievler İl Özel İdare Stadium
16:30 CET+3		Report		Attendance: 3.000; Referee: Sinan Cem İyihuylu

===== Second legs =====
18 May 2015	Darıca GB	0–2	Çorum Belediyespor	Darıca Town Stadium
16:30 CET+3		Report	Ahmet 65'; Berat 90'	Attendance: 2.500; Referee: Ercan Hellaç

18 May 2015	Zonguldak Kömürspor	1–1	İstanbulspor	Karaelmas Kemal Köksal Stadium
16:30 CET+3	Emrah 4'	Report	Gökhan 38'	Attendance: 10.000; Referee: Mesut Carık

==== Finals ====
Team 1	Score	Team 2
İstanbulspor	3–1	Çorum Belediyespor

26 May 2015	İstanbulspor	3–1	Çorum Belediyespor	Eskişehir Atatürk Stadium
19:00 CET+3	Hurşit 31'; Efe 34'; Veysi 88'	Report	Muhammed 36'	Attendance: 1.000; Referee: Yunus Yıldırım

== Group 2 ==
=== Teams ===
Locations of teams in 2014–15 TFF Third League

=== League table ===
Pos	Team	Pld	W	D	L	GF	GA	GD	Pts	Qualification or relegation
1	Eyüpspor (C, P)	34	21	8	5	50	25	+25	71	Promotion to 2. Lig
2	Sivas Belediye Spor (P)	34	19	6	9	41	24	+17	63	Qualification for Promotion Playoffs
3	Yeni Diyarbakırspor	34	16	14	4	48	27	+21	62	Qualification for Promotion Playoffs
4	Denizli Belediyespor	34	19	3	12	46	34	+12	60	Qualification for Promotion Playoffs
5	Gölcükspor	34	15	11	8	48	37	+11	56	Qualification for Promotion Playoffs
6	Kemer Tekirovaspor	34	15	8	11	55	46	+9	53	
7	Maltepe	34	13	9	12	42	36	+6	48	
8	Derincespor	34	12	12	10	44	44	0	48	
9	Çanakkale Dardanelspor	34	10	17	7	35	28	+7	47	
10	Sancaktepe Belediyespor	34	11	12	11	44	40	+4	45	
11	Yeşil Bursa	34	11	11	12	42	32	+10	44	
12	Arsinspor	34	11	11	12	40	36	+4	44	
13	Payas Belediyespor 1975	34	11	10	13	40	41	−1	43	
14	Çine Madranspor	34	10	7	17	40	52	−12	37	
15	Erzincan Refahiyespor	34	9	9	16	36	52	−16	36	
16	Halide Edip Adıvar SK (R)	34	9	5	20	32	54	−22	32	Relegation to Turkish Regional Amateur League
17	68 Yeni Aksarayspor (R)	34	6	12	16	21	43	−22	30	Relegation to Turkish Regional Amateur League
18	Çankırıspor (R)	34	3	5	26	22	75	−53	14	Relegation to Turkish Regional Amateur League

Updated to match(es) played on 10 May 2015. Source: TFF
Rules for classification: 1) points; 2) goal difference; 3) number of goals scored.
(C) Champions; (P) Promoted; (R) Relegated

=== Promotion Playoffs ===
==== Semifinals ====
Team 1	Agg.	Team 2	1st leg	2nd leg
Gölcükspor	1–2	Sivas 4 Eylül Bld.	0–0	1–2
Denizli BB	3–0	Yeni Diyarbakırspor	0–0	3–0

===== First legs =====
14 May 2015	Gölcükspor	0–0	Sivas 4 Eylül Bld.	Gölcük Town Stadium
16:30 CET+3		Report		Attendance: 2.000; Referee: Mustafa Kürşad Filiz

14 May 2015	Denizli BB	0–0	Yeni Diyarbakırspor	Doğan Seyfi Atlı Stadium
16:30 CET+3		Report		Attendance: 200; Referee: Ercan Hellaç

===== Second legs =====
18 May 2015	Sivas 4 Eylül Bld.	2–1	Gölcükspor	Sivas Muhsin Yazıcıoğlu Stadium
16:30 CET+3	Murat 8'; Ozan 87'	Report	Cemal 79'	Attendance: 700; Referee: Halil Umut Meler

18 May 2015	Yeni Diyarbakırspor	0–3	Denizli BB	Diyarbakır Atatürk Stadium
16:30 CET+3		Report		Attendance: 8.000; Referee: Hüseyin Sabancı

==== Finals ====
Team 1	Score	Team 2
Sivas 4 Eylül Bld.	1–0	Denizli BB

28 May 2015	Sivas 4 Eylül Bld.	1–0	Denizli BB	Sakarya Atatürk Stadium
19:00 CET+3	Gökhan 29'	Report		Attendance: 4.000; Referee: Özgür Yankaya

== Group 3 ==
=== Teams ===
Locations of teams in 2014–15 TFF Third League

=== League table ===
Pos	Team	Pld	W	D	L	GF	GA	GD	Pts	Qualification or relegation
1	Anadolu Üsküdar 1908 (C, P)	34	18	9	7	55	32	+23	63	Promotion to 2. Lig
2	Ankara Demirspor (P)	34	17	9	8	48	29	+19	60	Qualification for Promotion Playoffs
3	Sakaryaspor	34	15	12	7	43	32	+11	57	Qualification for Promotion Playoffs
4	Erzurum B.B.	34	14	12	8	42	34	+8	54	Qualification for Promotion Playoffs
5	Silivrispor	34	15	8	11	46	42	+4	53	Qualification for Promotion Playoffs
6	Kahramanmaraş BB	34	13	12	9	41	28	+13	51	
7	Beylerbeyi S.K.	34	11	15	8	39	33	+6	48	
8	Sandıklıspor	34	11	11	12	40	39	+1	44	
9	Orhangazispor	34	11	10	13	26	37	−11	43	
10	Erzin Belediyespor	34	11	9	14	41	47	−6	42	
11	Van BB	34	11	9	14	32	47	−15	42	
12	Bayburt Grup Özel İdarespor	34	11	9	14	36	31	+5	42	
13	Etimesgut Belediyespor	34	10	12	12	43	41	+2	42	
14	Ayvalıkgücü Belediyespor	34	9	14	11	34	38	−4	41	
15	Bergama Belediyespor	34	9	14	11	34	39	−5	41	
16	FBM Yaşamspor (R)	34	10	10	14	41	44	−3	40	Relegation to Turkish Regional Amateur League
17	Kayseri Şekerspor (R)	34	10	9	15	36	41	−5	39	Relegation to Turkish Regional Amateur League
18	Güngörenspor (R)	34	4	8	22	25	68	−43	20	Relegation to Turkish Regional Amateur League

Updated to match(es) played on 10 May 2015. Source: TFF
Rules for classification: 1) points; 2) goal difference; 3) number of goals scored.
(C) Champions; (P) Promoted; (R) Relegated

=== Promotion Playoffs ===
==== Semifinals ====
Team 1	Agg.	Team 2	1st leg	2nd leg
Silivrispor	2–4	Ankara Demirspor	1–1	1–3
Erzurum BŞB	0–1	Sakaryaspor	0–0	0–1

===== First legs =====
14 May 2015	Silivrispor	1–1	Ankara Demirspor	Silivri Stadium
16:30 CET+3	Bülent 26'	Report	Doğancan 80'	Attendance: 2.500; Referee: Halil Umut Meler

14 May 2015	Erzurum BŞB	0–0	Sakaryaspor	Kazım Karabekir Stadium
16:30 CET+3		Report		Attendance: 10.000; Referee: Hüseyin Sabancı

===== Second legs =====
18 May 2015	Ankara Demirspor	3–1	Silivrispor	Cebeci İnönü Stadium
16:30 CET+3	Fatih 19'; Emre 79', 90'	Report	Şemsettin 89'	Attendance: 250; Referee: Sinan Cem İyihuylu

18 May 2015	Sakaryaspor	1–0 (a.e.t.)	Erzurum BŞB	Sakarya Atatürk Stadium
16:30 CET+3	Burak 106'	Report		Attendance: 12.000; Referee: Kutluhan Bilgiç

==== Finals ====
Team 1	Score	Team 2
Ankara Demirspor	2–0	Sakaryaspor

27 May 2015	Ankara Demirspor	2–0	Sakaryaspor	İzmir Atatürk Stadium
19:00 CET+3	Umut 62'; Emre 90'	Report		Attendance: 10.000; Referee: Fırat Aydınus

== See also ==
- 2014–15 Turkish Cup
- 2014–15 Süper Lig
- 2014–15 TFF First League
- 2014–15 TFF Second League
