= 2016–17 TFF Third League =

TFF Third League
- Season: 2016–17
- Champions: Sancaktepe FK; BB Bodrumspor; Afyonspor
- Promoted: Sancaktepe FK; BB Bodrumspor; Afyonspor; Altay S.K. Silivrispor; Sakaryaspor
- Relegated: Kartalspor; Beylerbeyi SK; Kütahyaspor; Manavgatspor; Dersimspor; Derincespor; Turk Metal; Maltepespor; Denizli BB; Orduspor

The 2016–17 Third League (known as the Spor Toto 3. Lig for sponsorship reasons) is the 16th season of the league since its establishment in 2001 as the fourth level division; and the 46th season of the third league in Turkish football since its establishment in 1967–68.

== Group 1 ==
=== League table ===
Pos	Team	Pld	W	D	L	GF	GA	GD	Pts	Qualification or relegation
1	Sancaktepe FK (P)	36	20	12	4	52	22	+30	72	Promotion to 2. Lig
2	Altay S.K. (P)	36	17	13	6	67	41	+26	64	Qualification for Promotion Playoffs
3	Ankara Demirspor	36	17	13	6	54	35	+19	64	Qualification for Promotion Playoffs
4	Kocaelispor	36	16	13	7	55	35	+20	61	Qualification for Promotion Playoffs
5	Çorumspor	36	16	10	10	46	29	+17	58	Qualification for Promotion Playoffs
6	Gölcükspor	36	15	11	10	48	41	+7	56	
7	Kızılcabölükspor	36	13	13	10	42	37	+5	52	
8	FK Vanspor	36	12	12	12	36	42	−6	48	
9	24 Erzincanspor	36	12	12	12	42	36	+6	48	
10	Bayburtspor	36	12	11	13	41	41	0	47	
11	Kozanspor	36	11	12	13	41	44	−3	45	
12	Erzinspor	36	12	9	15	43	53	−10	45	
13	Cizrespor	36	10	12	14	32	43	−11	42	
14	Karacabey Belediyespor	36	10	10	16	59	61	−2	40	
15	Tekirdağspor	36	9	12	15	32	47	−15	39	
16	Kartalspor (R)	36	11	6	19	33	47	−14	39	Relegation to Turkish Regional Amateur League
17	Beylerbeyi SK (R)	36	9	11	16	46	57	−11	38	Relegation to Turkish Regional Amateur League
18	Kütahyaspor (R)	36	8	11	17	38	63	−25	35	Relegation to Turkish Regional Amateur League
19	Manavgatspor (R)	36	4	13	19	27	60	−33	25	Relegation to Turkish Regional Amateur League

Updated to match(es) played on 14 May 2017. Source: TFF
Rules for classification: 1) points; 2) goal difference; 3) number of goals scored.
(P) Promoted; (R) Relegated

=== Promotion Playoffs ===
==== Semifinals ====
Team 1	Agg.	Team 2	1st leg	2nd leg
Çorumspor	2–4	Altay	2–0	0–4
Kocaelispor	2–0	Ankara Demirspor	0–0	2–0

==== Finals ====
Team 1	Score	Team 2
Kocaelispor	1–1 (4–5 p)	Altay

== Group 2 ==
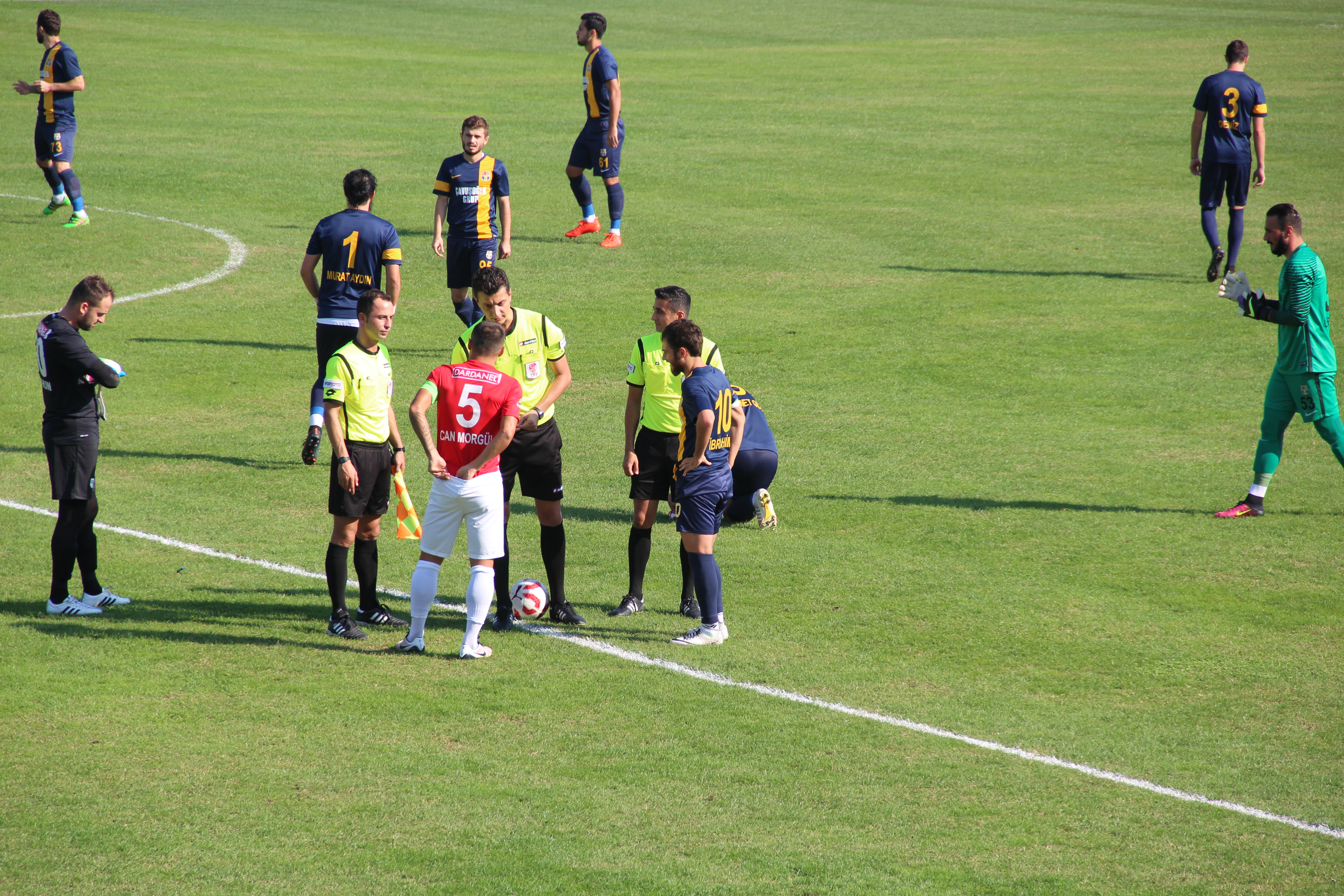
Derincespor - Dardanelspor on 2 October 2016

=== League table ===
Pos	Team	Pld	W	D	L	GF	GA	GD	Pts	Qualification or relegation
1	Bodrum Belediyesi Bodrumspor (C, P)	34	19	8	7	59	31	+28	65	Promotion to 2. Lig
2	Erbaaspor	34	16	12	6	48	29	+19	60	Qualification for Promotion Playoffs
3	Silivrispor (P)	34	16	10	8	34	25	+9	58	Qualification for Promotion Playoffs
4	Manisa BB	34	15	13	6	59	37	+22	58	Qualification for Promotion Playoffs
5	Çatalcaspor	34	15	10	9	42	33	+9	55	Qualification for Promotion Playoffs
6	Düzcespor	34	14	12	8	55	46	+9	54	
7	Halide Edip Adıvar	34	15	8	11	46	39	+7	53	
8	Kırıkhanspor	34	12	11	11	36	39	−3	47	
9	Kemerspor 2003	34	11	12	11	52	45	+7	45	
10	Yomraspor	34	10	14	10	28	29	−1	44	
11	Tire 1922	34	11	10	13	41	46	−5	43	
12	Batman Petrolspor	34	11	10	13	38	38	0	43	
13	Yeşil Bursa	34	11	8	15	40	35	+5	41	
14	Çanakkale Dardanelspor	34	11	8	15	42	54	−12	41	
15	Pazarspor	34	11	6	17	34	46	−12	39	
16	Dersimspor (R)	34	9	6	19	33	54	−21	33	Relegation to Turkish Regional Amateur League
17	Derincespor (R)	34	5	11	18	31	59	−28	26	Relegation to Turkish Regional Amateur League
18	Türk Metal Kırıkkalespor (R)	34	4	11	19	28	61	−33	23	Relegation to Turkish Regional Amateur League

Updated to match(es) played on 14 May 2017. Source: TFF
Rules for classification: 1) points; 2) goal difference; 3) number of goals scored.
(C) Champions; (P) Promoted; (R) Relegated

=== Promotion Playoffs ===
==== Semifinals ====
Team 1	Agg.	Team 2	1st leg	2nd leg
Çatalcaspor	1–2	Erbaaspor	1–0	0–2
Manisa BB	0–3	Silivrispor	0–2	0–1

==== Finals ====
Team 1	Score	Team 2
Erbaaspor	0–1	Silivrispor

== Group 3 ==
=== League table ===
Pos	Team	Pld	W	D	L	GF	GA	GD	Pts	Qualification or relegation
1	Afjet Afyonspor (C, P)	34	22	8	4	62	25	+37	74	Promotion to 2. Lig
2	Sakaryaspor (P)	34	20	8	6	66	27	+39	68	Qualification for Promotion Playoffs
3	Darıca Gençlerbirliği	34	21	5	8	60	28	+32	68	Qualification for Promotion Playoffs
4	Diyarbekirspor	34	18	6	10	54	43	+11	60	Qualification for Promotion Playoffs
5	Bayrampaşa	34	15	11	8	52	38	+14	56	Qualification for Promotion Playoffs
6	Elaziz Belediyespor	34	14	12	8	51	37	+14	54	
7	Düzyurtspor	34	14	8	12	42	34	+8	50	
8	Tarsus İdman Yurdu	34	13	9	12	57	53	+4	48	
9	Ankara Adliyespor	34	12	6	16	38	49	−11	42	
10	Muğlaspor	34	11	9	14	41	54	−13	42	
11	Orhangazispor	34	12	5	17	40	43	−3	41	
12	Sultanbeyli Belediyespor	34	10	10	14	38	49	−11	40	
13	Bergama Belediyespor	34	10	9	15	31	44	−13	39	
14	12 Bingölspor	34	9	12	13	31	42	−11	39	
15	Payasspor	34	7	14	13	26	40	−14	35	
16	Maltepespor (R)	34	8	8	18	23	49	−26	32	Relegation to Turkish Regional Amateur League
17	Denizli BB (R)	34	4	10	20	26	54	−28	22	Relegation to Turkish Regional Amateur League
18	Orduspor (R)	34	7	8	19	36	65	−29	20	Relegation to Turkish Regional Amateur League

Updated to match(es) played on 14 May 2017. Source: TFF
Rules for classification: 1) points; 2) goal difference; 3) number of goals scored.
(C) Champions; (P) Promoted; (R) Relegated

=== Promotion Playoffs ===
==== Semifinals ====
Team 1	Agg.	Team 2	1st leg	2nd leg
Bayrampaşa	0–5	Sakaryaspor	0–1	0–4
Diyarbekirspor	2–2	Darıca Gençlerbirliği	0–1	2–1

==== Finals ====
Team 1	Score	Team 2
Sakaryaspor	2–1 (a.e.t.)	Diyarbekirspor

== See also ==
- 2016–17 Turkish Cup
- 2016–17 Süper Lig
- 2016–17 TFF First League
- 2016–17 TFF Second League
