= 2017–18 in Turkish football =

Football in Turkey
- Season: 2017–18

Men's football
- Süper Lig: Galatasaray
- First League: Çaykur Rizespor
- Turkish Cup: Akhisar Belediyespor
- Turkish Super Cup: Konyaspor

The 2017–18 season was the 113th season of competitive football in Turkey.

== Pre-season ==
League	Promoted to league	Relegated from league
Süper Lig	Sivasspor; Yeni Malatyaspor; Göztepe	Çaykur Rizespor; Gaziantepspor; Adanaspor
1.Lig	İstanbulspor; Ankaragücü; Erzurum BB	Şanlıurfaspor; Bandırmaspor; Mersin İdman Yurdu
2.Lig	Sancaktepe Belediyespor; Altay; BB Bodrumspor; Silivrispor; Afjet Afyonspor; Sakaryaspor	Anadolu Üsküdar 1908; Tepecikspor; Ofspor; Aydınspor; 1461 Trabzon; Kayseri Erciyesspor
3.Lig	Şanlıurfa Karaköprü Belediyespor; Arsinspor; Güzelorduspor; Osmaniyespor; Yeni Altındağ Belediyespor; Utaş Uşakspor; Turgutluspor; Erokspor; Ergene Velimeşespor	Kartalspor; Beylerbeyi SK; Kütahyaspor; Manavgatspor; Dersimspor; Derincespor; Türk Metal Kırıkkalespor; Maltepespor; Denizli Belediyespor; Orduspor

== League tables ==
=== Süper Lig ===
Pos	Team	Pld	W	D	L	GF	GA	GD	Pts	Qualification or relegation
1	Galatasaray (C)	34	24	3	7	75	33	+42	75	Qualification for the Champions League group stage
2	Fenerbahçe	34	21	9	4	78	36	+42	72 (Note: Fenerbahçe ahead of Başakşehir on head-to-head goal difference: Fenerbahçe 2–3 Başakşehir, Başakşehir 0–2 Fenerbahçe.)	Qualification for the Champions League third qualifying round
3	İstanbul Başakşehir	34	22	6	6	62	34	+28	72	Qualification for the Europa League third qualifying round
4	Beşiktaş	34	21	8	5	69	30	+39	71	Qualification for the Europa League second qualifying round
5	Trabzonspor	34	15	10	9	63	51	+12	55	
6	Göztepe	34	13	10	11	49	50	−1	49 (Note: Göztepe ahead of Sivasspor on head-to-head points: Göztepe 6 pts, Sivasspor 0 pts.)	
7	Sivasspor	34	14	7	13	45	53	−8	49	
8	Kasımpaşa	34	13	7	14	57	58	−1	46	
9	Kayserispor	34	12	8	14	44	55	−11	44	
10	Yeni Malatyaspor	34	11	10	13	38	45	−7	43	
11	Akhisarspor	34	11	9	14	44	53	−9	42	Qualification for the Europa League group stage (Note: Akhisarspor qualified for the Europa League group stage by winning the 2017–18 Turkish Cup.)
12	Alanyaspor	34	11	7	16	55	59	−4	40	
13	Bursaspor	34	11	6	17	43	48	−5	39	
14	Antalyaspor	34	10	8	16	40	59	−19	38	
15	Konyaspor	34	9	9	16	38	42	−4	36	
16	Osmanlıspor (R)	34	8	9	17	49	60	−11	33 (Note: Osmanlıspor ahead of Gençlerbirliği on head-to-head points: Osmanlıspor 6 pts, Gençlerbirliği 0 pts.)	Relegation to TFF First League
17	Gençlerbirliği (R)	34	8	9	17	37	54	−17	33	Relegation to TFF First League
18	Kardemir Karabükspor (R)	34	3	3	28	20	86	−66	12	Relegation to TFF First League

Source: Süper Lig, Soccerway
Rules for classification: 1) Points; 2) Head-to-head points; 3) Head-to-head goal difference; 4) Head-to-head goals scored; 5) Goal difference; 6) Goals scored; 7) Play-off.
(C) Champions; (R) Relegated

=== 1.Lig ===
Pos	Team	Pld	W	D	L	GF	GA	GD	Pts	Qualification or relegation
1	Rizespor (C, P)	34	20	9	5	68	38	+30	69	Promotion to the Süper Lig
2	Ankaragücü (P)	34	18	9	7	55	34	+21	63	Promotion to the Süper Lig
3	Boluspor	34	18	6	10	53	30	+23	60	Qualification for the Süper Lig Playoffs
4	Ümraniyespor	34	17	8	9	49	35	+14	59	Qualification for the Süper Lig Playoffs
5	Erzurum BB (O, P)	34	14	11	9	56	44	+12	53 (Note: Head-to-head points: Erzurum BB 8 pts, Gazişehir Gaziantep 7 pts, Altınordu 1 pt)	Qualification for the Süper Lig Playoffs
6	Gazişehir Gaziantep	34	15	8	11	57	38	+19	53	Qualification for the Süper Lig Playoffs
7	Altınordu	34	15	8	11	55	45	+10	53	
8	Balıkesirspor	34	16	7	11	56	46	+10	52 (Note: Balıkesirspor have been deducted 3 points.)	
9	İstanbulspor	34	14	8	12	45	39	+6	50	
10	Elazığspor	34	13	9	12	53	44	+9	48	
11	Giresunspor	34	13	8	13	50	44	+6	47	
12	Adanaspor	34	12	7	15	41	56	−15	43	
13	Adana Demirspor	34	11	8	15	44	47	−3	41 (Note: Adana Demirspor is ahead of Eskişehirspor on head-to-head points: Eskişehirspor 2-2 Adana Demirspor, Adana Demirspor 3-1 Eskişehirspor)	
14	Eskişehirspor (Note: Eskişehirspor have been deducted 3 points.)	34	12	8	14	63	56	+7	41	
15	Denizlispor	34	10	8	16	43	47	−4	38	
16	Samsunspor (R)	34	7	15	12	32	46	−14	36	Relegation to the TFF Second League
17	Manisaspor (R)	34	7	3	24	31	80	−49	15 (Note: Manisaspor have been deducted 9 points.)	Relegation to the TFF Second League
18	Gaziantepspor (R)	34	2	4	28	18	100	−82	1 (Note: Gaziantepspor have been deducted 9 points.)	Relegation to the TFF Second League

Source: TFF First League
Rules for classification: 1) Points; 2) Head-to-head points; 3) Head-to-head goal difference; 4) Head-to-head goals scored; 5) Goal difference; 6) Goals scored
(C) Champions; (O) Play-off winners; (P) Promoted; (R) Relegated

== Turkish Cup ==
- Teams seeded for the group stages: Konyaspor (defending champions), Beşiktaş (1st in the Süper Lig), İstanbul Başakşehir (2nd), and Fenerbahçe (3rd).
- Teams seeded for the play-off round: Galatasaray (4th in the Süper Lig), Antalyaspor (5th), Trabzonspor (6th), Akhisar Belediyespor (7th), Gençlerbirliği (8th), Kasımpaşa S.K. (10th), Kardemir Karabükspor (11th), Alanyaspor (12th), Osmanlıspor (13th), Bursaspor (14th), Kayserispor (15th), Sivasspor (1.Lig champions), Yeni Malatyaspor (1.Lig runners-up), and Göztepe (promoted from the 1.Lig)
- Teams seeded for the second round: Çaykur Rizespor (16th in the Süper Lig), Gaziantepspor (17th), Adanaspor (18th), Eskişehirspor (3rd in the 1.Lig), Boluspor (4th), Giresunspor (6th), Altınordu (7th), Ümraniyespor (8th), Balıkesirspor (9th), Elazığspor (10th), Denizlispor (11th), Manisaspor (12th), Gaziantep B.B. (13th), Adana Demirspor (14th), Samsunspor (15th), Şanlıurfaspor (16th in the 1.Lig), Bandırmaspor (17th), Mersin İdman Yurdu (18th),

=== Final ===
10 May 2018
20:30 TRT

Akhisarspor	3–2	Fenerbahçe
Lopes 32'; Sissoko 70'; Barbosa 81'	Report	Fernandão 56'; Souza 86'

Diyarbakır Stadium, Diyarbakır
Referee: Cüneyt Çakır

== National team ==
=== Friendlies ===
9 November 2017 Friendly	Romania	2–0	Turkey	Cluj-Napoca, Romania
21:30 UTC+3	Grozav 42', 69'			Stadium: CFR Cluj Stadium; Attendance: 16,000; Referee: Tiago Martins (Portugal)

13 November 2017 Friendly	Turkey	2–3	Albania	Antalya, Turkey
20:30 UTC+3	Ünder 47'; Akbaba 60'		Sadiku 24', 39'; Grezda 55'	Stadium: Antalya Stadium; Attendance: 8,900; Referee: Georgi Kabakov (Bulgaria)

23 March 2018 Friendly	Turkey	1–0	Republic of Ireland	Antalya, Turkey
20:30 UTC+3	Topal 52'			Stadium: Antalya Stadium; Attendance: 32,000; Referee: Slavko Vinčić (Slovenia)

27 March 2018 Friendly	Montenegro	2–2	Turkey	Podgorica, Montenegro
19:10 UTC+2	Ivanić 45'; Mugoša 87'		Ünder 11'; Yokuşlu 23'	Stadium: Podgorica City Stadium; Attendance: 6,000; Referee: Milorad Mažić (Serbia)

28 May 2018 Friendly	Turkey	2–1	Iran	Istanbul, Turkey
21:15 UTC+3	Tosun 6', 50'		Dejagah 90+2' (pen.)	Stadium: Başakşehir Fatih Terim Stadium; Attendance: 7,500; Referee: Valentin Kovalenko (Uzbekistan)

1 June 2018 Friendly	Tunisia	2–2	Turkey	Geneva, Switzerland
20:15 UTC+2	Badri 56'; Sassi 79'		Tosun 54' (pen.); Söyüncü 90'	Stadium: Stade de Genève; Attendance: 12,000; Referee: Fedayi San (Switzerland)

5 June 2018 Friendly	Russia	1–1	Turkey	Moscow, Russia
19:00 UTC+3	Samedov 35'		Mallı 59'	Stadium: VEB Arena; Attendance: 27,423; Referee: Ovidiu Hațegan (Romania)

=== 2018 FIFA World Cup qualification ===
Pos	Team	Pld	W	D	L	GF	GA	GD	Pts	Qualification	Iceland	Croatia	Ukraine	Turkey	Finland	Kosovo
1	Iceland	10	7	1	2	16	7	+9	22	Qualification to 2018 FIFA World Cup	—	1–0	2–0	2–0	3–2	2–0
2	Croatia	10	6	2	2	15	4	+11	20	Advance to second round	2–0	—	1–0	1–1	1–1	1–0
3	Ukraine	10	5	2	3	13	9	+4	17		1–1	0–2	—	2–0	1–0	3–0
4	Turkey	10	4	3	3	14	13	+1	15		0–3	1–0	2–2	—	2–0	2–0
5	Finland	10	2	3	5	9	13	−4	9		1–0	0–1	1–2	2–2	—	1–1
6	Kosovo	10	0	1	9	3	24	−21	1		1–2	0–6	0–2	1–4	0–1	—

Source: FIFA
Rules for classification: Qualification tiebreakers

2 September 2017 2018 FIFA World Cup Q	Ukraine	2–0	Turkey	Kharkiv, Ukraine
21:45 UTC+3	Yarmolenko 18', 42'	Report (FIFA); Report (UEFA)		Stadium: Metalist Stadium; Attendance: 36,796; Referee: David Fernández Borbalán (Spain)

5 September 2017 2018 FIFA World Cup Q	Turkey	1–0	Croatia	Eskişehir, Turkey
21:45 UTC+3	Tosun 75'	Report (FIFA); Report (UEFA)		Stadium: Eskişehir Stadium; Attendance: 28,600; Referee: Viktor Kassai (Hungary)

6 October 2017 2018 FIFA World Cup Q	Turkey	0–3	Iceland	Eskişehir, Turkey
21:45 UTC+3		Report (FIFA); Report (UEFA)	Guðmundsson 32'; B.Bjarnason 39'; Árnason 49'	Stadium: Eskişehir Stadium; Attendance: 30,390; Referee: Szymon Marciniak (Poland)

9 October 2017 2018 FIFA World Cup Q	Finland	2–2	Turkey	Turku, Finland
21:45 UTC+3	Arajuuri 76'; Pohjanpalo 88'	Report (FIFA); Report (UEFA)	Tosun 57', 83'	Stadium: Veritas Stadion; Attendance: 6,612; Referee: Benoît Bastien (France)

== Turkish clubs in Europe ==
=== UEFA Champions League ===
==== Third qualifying round ====
Team 1	Agg.	Team 2	1st leg	2nd leg
Club Brugge (Belgium)	3–5	(Turkey) İstanbul Başakşehir	3–3	0–2

==== Play-off round ====
Team 1	Agg.	Team 2	1st leg	2nd leg
İstanbul Başakşehir (Turkey)	3–4	(Spain) Sevilla	1–2	2–2

==== Group stage ====
===== Group G =====
Pos	Team	Pld	W	D	L	GF	GA	GD	Pts	Qualification	BES	POR	RBL	MON
1	(Turkey) Beşiktaş	6	4	2	0	11	5	+6	14	Advance to knockout phase	—	1–1	2–0	1–1
2	(Portugal) Porto	6	3	1	2	15	10	+5	10	Advance to knockout phase	1–3	—	3–1	5–2
3	(Germany) RB Leipzig	6	2	1	3	10	11	−1	7	Transfer to Europa League	1–2	3–2	—	1–1
4	(France) Monaco	6	0	2	4	6	16	−10	2		1–2	0–3	1–4	—

Source: UEFA
Rules for classification: Group stage tiebreakers

===== Round of 16 =====
Team 1	Agg.	Team 2	1st leg	2nd leg
Bayern Munich (Germany)	8–1	(Turkey) Beşiktaş	5–0	3–1

=== UEFA Europa League ===
==== Second qualifying round ====
Team 1	Agg.	Team 2	1st leg	2nd leg
Östersund (Sweden)	3–1	(Turkey) Galatasaray	2–0	1–1

==== Third qualifying round ====
Team 1	Agg.	Team 2	1st leg	2nd leg
Sturm Graz (Austria)	2–3	(Turkey) Fenerbahçe	1–2	1–1

==== Play-off round ====
Team 1	Agg.	Team 2	1st leg	2nd leg
Vardar (North Macedonia)	4–1	(Turkey) Fenerbahçe	2–0	2–1

==== Group stage ====
===== Group C =====
Pos	Team	Pld	W	D	L	GF	GA	GD	Pts	Qualification	BRA	LUD	IBS	HOF
1	(Portugal) Braga	6	3	1	2	9	8	+1	10	Advance to knockout phase	—	0–2	2–1	3–1
2	(Bulgaria) Ludogorets Razgrad	6	2	3	1	7	5	+2	9	Advance to knockout phase	1–1	—	1–2	2–1
3	(Turkey) İstanbul Başakşehir	6	2	2	2	7	8	−1	8		2–1	0–0	—	1–1
4	(Germany) TSG Hoffenheim	6	1	2	3	8	10	−2	5		1–2	1–1	3–1	—

Source: UEFA

===== Group I =====
Pos	Team	Pld	W	D	L	GF	GA	GD	Pts	Qualification	SAL	MAR	KON	VSC
1	(Austria) Red Bull Salzburg	6	3	3	0	7	1	+6	12	Advance to knockout phase	—	1–0	0–0	3–0
2	(France) Marseille	6	2	2	2	4	4	0	8	Advance to knockout phase	0–0	—	1–0	2–1
3	(Turkey) Konyaspor	6	1	3	2	4	6	−2	6		0–2	1–1	—	2–1
4	(Portugal) Vitória de Guimarães	6	1	2	3	5	9	−4	5		1–1	1–0	1–1	—

Source: UEFA
