= 2014–15 TFF 2. Lig =

Second League
- Season: 2014–2015
- Champions: White Group; Yeni Malatyaspor; Red Group; Göztepe
- Promoted: Yeni Malatyaspor; Göztepe; 1461 Trabzon
- Relegated: Turgutluspor; Körfez İskenderunspor; Ofspor; TKİ Tavşanlı Linyitspor; Gölbaşıspor; Birlik Nakliyat Düzyurtspor; Altay

The 2014–15 Second League (known as the Spor Toto 2. Lig for sponsorship reasons) is the third level in the Turkish football.

== Teams ==
- Fethiyespor, 1461 Trabzon, TKİ Tavşanlı Linyitspor, and Kahramanmaraşspor A.Ş. relegated from PTT First League.
- Giresunspor, Altınordu A.Ş., and Alanyaspor promoted to 2014–15 TFF First League.
- Birlik Nakliyat Düzyurtspor, Fatih Karagümrükspor A.Ş., Hacettepe Spor, Keçiörengücü, Gölbaşıspor A.Ş., and Menemen Belediye Spor promoted from TFF Third League.
- Çanakkale Dardanelspor, Gaziosmanpaşa, Çankırı Belediyespor, Eyüpspor, İstanbul Güngörenspor, and Bozüyükspor relegated to 2014–15 TFF Third League

=== Locations ===
Locations of teams in 2014–15 TFF Second League
Istanbul TFF Second League football clubs

== White Group ==
=== League table ===
Pos	Team	Pld	W	D	L	GF	GA	GD	Pts	Qualification or relegation
1	Yeni Malatyaspor (C, P)	36	19	9	8	54	30	+24	66	Promotion to TFF First League
2	Pendikspor	36	18	8	10	58	44	+14	62	Qualification for Promotion Playoffs
3	Ümraniyespor	36	15	14	7	47	30	+17	59	Qualification for Promotion Playoffs
4	1461 Trabzon (P)	36	16	11	9	51	33	+18	59	Qualification for Promotion Playoffs
5	Menemen Belediye Spor	36	14	15	7	44	35	+9	57	Qualification for Promotion Playoffs
6	Fatih Karagümrük	36	14	15	7	41	34	+7	57	
7	Aydınspor 1923	36	15	9	12	44	42	+2	54	
8	Kartalspor (Note: 6 points deducted)	36	16	12	8	46	34	+12	54	
9	Konya Anadolu Selçukspor	36	11	12	13	43	42	+1	45	
10	Bayrampaşaspor	36	10	15	11	31	43	−12	45	
11	Tokatspor	36	10	15	11	40	47	−7	45	
12	Hacettepe Spor	36	11	11	14	36	36	0	44	
13	Keçiörengücü	36	10	13	13	45	42	+3	43	
14	Fethiyespor	36	10	13	13	28	39	−11	43	
15	Tarsus İ.Y.	36	9	15	12	41	47	−6	42	
16	Körfez İskenderunspor (R)	36	9	12	15	35	47	−12	39	Relegation to TFF Third League
17	Turgutluspor (R)	36	9	12	15	34	38	−4	39	Relegation to TFF Third League
18	Ofspor A.Ş. (R)	36	9	11	16	38	48	−10	38	Relegation to TFF Third League
19	TKİ Tavşanlı Linyitspor (R)	36	3	6	27	28	73	−45	15	Relegation to TFF Third League

Source: TFF Second League page
Rules for classification: 1) points; 2) goal difference; 3) number of goals scored.
(C) Champions; (P) Promoted; (R) Relegated

=== Results ===
Home \ Away	TRA	AYD	BYR	CKG	FTH	HAC	KRT	KEG	ANS	İDÇ	MBS	OFS	PDK	TİY	TVL	TOK	TRG	ÜMR	YML
1461 Trabzon		1–1	1–1	0–2	4–0	1–0	3–1	1–0	1–1	2–1	3–1	3–2	1–0	3–1	5–1	2–0	1–2	0–0	0–2
Aydınspor 1923	0–3		2–3	0–1	1–0	2–1	4–2	0–2	1–1	4–1	1–1	2–0	2–0	0–0	4–0	0–0	1–0	2–1	1–0
Bayrampaşaspor	1–1	0–1		1–0	3–2	0–1	1–3	1–0	1–1	1–1	2–1	3–2	2–1	1–0	0–2	0–0	0–0	0–0	2–2
Fatih Karagümrük	1–4	2–1	1–1		0–0	2–1	1–1	2–2	1–0	0–0	0–1	0–1	3–2	2–0	4–2	2–1	1–1	1–0	0–1
Fethiyespor	1–1	1–0	1–0	2–1		1–1	0–2	0–0	2–0	2–1	0–0	1–1	2–2	0–0	2–1	1–1	0–1	1–1	1–2
Hacettepe Spor	0–0	0–0	0–0	0–0	2–0		0–1	2–2	0–1	0–1	0–0	0–0	3–0	3–3	1–0	0–1	3–1	1–4	0–2
Kartalspor	1–0	2–2	3–0	0–0	0–1	2–1		1–1	1–0	2–1	2–0	0–0	1–0	2–3	1–0	1–1	1–1	0–0	1–0
Keçiörengücü	0–1	5–1	1–0	1–2	2–0	1–1	1–1		1–3	3–0	1–2	1–0	3–3	0–1	3–1	1–1	4–1	1–2	2–1
Konya Anadolu Selçukspor	1–0	1–2	0–0	0–0	1–2	1–3	1–2	3–0		2–2	0–0	3–1	2–1	0–1	0–1	2–2	1–0	0–0	2–2
Körfez İskenderunspor	0–0	1–0	2–1	0–1	0–0	1–2	3–0	0–0	0–1		0–0	2–5	0–1	2–3	1–0	1–2	1–0	1–2	1–2
Menemen Belediye Spor	1–1	3–0	1–1	1–2	2–1	2–1	2–2	1–0	1–1	0–0		1–1	1–0	2–0	4–2	0–0	2–2	2–1	1–0
Ofspor A.Ş.	2–0	3–1	1–1	1–1	0–1	0–2	1–3	2–2	2–0	0–2	0–0		0–1	1–0	3–0	0–0	0–0	3–1	0–1
Pendikspor	1–1	1–2	2–1	1–2	3–1	1–0	2–1	1–0	3–0	1–1	3–2	2–2		0–0	2–1	5–1	1–0	1–1	2–2
Tarsus İ.Y.	2–4	0–0	0–0	4–2	3–1	1–0	0–0	1–2	1–6	1–1	1–1	5–1	1–2		2–2	1–1	1–1	0–1	1–1
TKİ Tavşanlı Linyitspor	0–1	1–3	0–1	1–1	0–0	2–3	1–2	0–0	2–4	2–2	0–2	1–2	1–3	0–1		0–0	1–0	1–4	1–2
Tokatspor	2–1	2–0	0–0	1–1	2–0	1–1	1–4	3–1	1–2	0–2	1–2	2–0	1–3	1–1	2–1		0–1	3–1	1–3
Turgutluspor	0–0	0–1	6–0	1–1	0–1	0–2	1–0	1–0	1–1	2–3	0–1	2–0	1–2	1–1	2–0	1–2		0–0	3–2
Ümraniyespor	1–0	2–2	1–2	1–1	0–0	0–1	1–0	1–1	2–1	0–0	3–1	2–0	2–1	2–1	4–0	4–1	0–0		2–1
Yeni Malatyaspor	3–1	1–0	3–0	0–0	1–0	2–0	0–0	1–1	2–0	5–0	0–2	2–1	0–1	1–0	2–0	2–2	3–1	0–0	

Source: tff.org (in Turkish)
Legend: Blue = home team win; Yellow = draw; Red = away team win.

==== Top goalscorers ====
As of 11 May 2015.

Rank	Player	Club	Goals
1	(Turkey) Yıldıray Koçal	Keçiörengücü	18
2	(Turkey) Aydın Çetin	Yeni Malatyaspor	16
2	(Turkey) Halil İbrahim Sönmez	Konya Anadolu Selçukspor	16
4	(Turkey) İlhan Şahin	Pendikspor	15
5	(Turkey) Emre Okur	Fethiyespor	13
5	(Turkey) Haluk Türkeri	Menemen Belediye Spor	13
5	(Turkey) Yaser Hacımustafaoğlu	1461 Trabzon	13
8	(Turkey) Atabey Çiçek	Hacettepe Spor	12
8	(Turkey) Mehmet Albayrak	Kartalspor	12
8	(Turkey) Yaser Yıldız	Pendikspor	12

== Red Group ==
=== League table ===
Pos	Team	Pld	W	D	L	GF	GA	GD	Pts	Qualification or relegation
1	Göztepe A.Ş. (C, P)	34	19	12	3	57	30	+27	69	Promotion to TFF First League
2	Bandırmaspor	34	18	10	6	52	32	+20	64	Qualification for Promotion Playoffs
3	Hatayspor	34	17	9	8	46	32	+14	60	Qualification for Promotion Playoffs
4	İnegölspor	34	16	10	8	46	28	+18	58	Qualification for Promotion Playoffs
5	Sarıyer	34	14	13	7	54	41	+13	55	Qualification for Promotion Playoffs
6	Nazilli Belediyespor	34	13	11	10	45	40	+5	50	
7	Kocaeli Birlik Spor	34	11	12	11	36	35	+1	45	
8	Amed	34	11	11	12	46	41	+5	44	
9	MKE Ankaragücü	34	11	11	12	41	39	+2	44	
10	Kırklarelispor	34	8	15	11	37	42	−5	39	
11	Pazarspor	34	9	12	13	34	42	−8	39	
12	Gümüşhanespor	34	7	17	10	26	35	−9	38	
13	Bugsaşspor	34	9	11	14	27	34	−7	38	
14	Kahramanmaraşspor A.Ş.	34	10	8	16	33	45	−12	38	
15	Tepecikspor A.Ş.	34	8	12	14	49	55	−6	36	
16	Gölbaşıspor A.Ş. (R)	34	8	11	15	33	47	−14	35	Relegation to TFF Third League
17	Birlik Nakliyat Düzyurtspor (R)	34	7	13	14	28	47	−19	34	Relegation to TFF Third League
18	Altay (R)	34	5	12	17	25	51	−26	27	Relegation to TFF Third League

Source: TFF Second League page
Rules for classification: 1) points; 2) goal difference; 3) number of goals scored.
(C) Champions; (P) Promoted; (R) Relegated

=== Results ===
Home \ Away	ALT	BAN	BND	BUG	ASK	GÖL	GÖZ	GMH	HTY	ING	KMS	KRL	KRF	MKE	NBS	PAZ	SAR	TPC
Altay		0–4	3–1	2–1	0–0	1–2	2–2	3–0	1–1	3–5	1–1	0–0	0–2	1–1	1–0	0–0	0–3	0–1
Bandırmaspor	3–0		1–1	1–0	2–2	3–1	0–0	3–1	0–1	1–0	1–0	2–2	1–0	2–0	0–0	2–1	1–3	1–1
Birlik Nakliyat Düzyurtspor	1–0	0–2		1–0	1–1	0–0	0–2	0–0	1–1	0–3	0–0	0–2	1–1	5–2	1–3	0–1	2–0	1–1
Bugsaşspor	3–0	0–1	1–1		1–1	0–2	0–0	1–1	1–2	0–0	0–0	0–2	2–0	1–1	0–0	2–0	2–1	1–0
Amed	1–0	4–1	0–1	0–0		3–0	2–0	1–1	2–0	2–4	2–1	3–1	2–1	3–2	2–2	4–0	0–0	1–0
Gölbaşıspor A.Ş.	2–1	3–2	4–0	0–0	1–1		0–2	1–0	2–0	0–2	0–3	0–0	0–1	2–3	1–2	0–1	2–2	1–3
Göztepe A.Ş.	3–0	1–4	3–0	2–0	2–0	2–1		1–0	1–0	1–1	1–0	3–1	2–1	2–1	2–0	0–2	0–0	0–0
Gümüşhanespor	0–0	1–1	0–1	1–0	1–0	1–1	0–0		3–1	1–1	0–0	1–0	0–0	1–0	1–1	1–1	1–3	3–0
Hatayspor	3–1	3–3	2–1	4–0	2–0	0–0	1–1	3–0		0–1	1–1	1–0	1–0	2–1	2–0	2–2	1–2	1–0
İnegölspor	1–1	0–1	2–1	0–1	1–1	3–1	3–3	1–0	2–3		0–0	1–0	0–1	1–0	1–2	3–1	2–0	3–1
Kahramanmaraşspor A.Ş.	2–0	1–0	2–1	1–1	2–1	1–1	0–3	0–1	0–3	0–1		1–0	2–1	1–2	0–1	5–2	1–3	3–1
Kırklarelispor	1–1	1–2	0–0	1–0	3–2	1–1	2–2	1–1	3–0	1–0	0–1		3–0	1–0	1–1	0–0	0–3	2–2
Kocaeli Birlik Spor	0–1	0–1	0–1	2–0	2–1	0–0	1–1	1–1	1–1	0–0	2–1	2–2		1–1	2–0	1–0	1–1	2–2
MKE Ankaragücü	2–0	1–1	3–0	1–0	1–1	0–1	1–1	0–0	0–0	0–0	1–0	3–0	1–2		3–1	3–0	2–0	2–2
Nazilli Belediyespor	0–0	0–0	4–2	1–3	2–1	2–1	3–4	3–0	0–1	1–0	3–1	3–0	2–3	4–1		0–3	1–1	0–0
Pazarspor	0–0	0–1	1–1	4–2	2–0	3–1	0–2	1–1	0–1	1–2	3–1	0–0	1–1	1–0	1–2		0–0	1–1
Sarıyer	3–2	3–2	2–2	1–2	2–1	0–0	2–4	2–2	1–0	0–0	4–1	2–2	1–0	1–1	0–0	2–0		2–1
Tepecikspor A.Ş.	2–0	1–2	0–0	0–2	2–1	4–1	2–4	3–1	1–2	0–2	4–0	4–4	2–4	1–2	1–1	1–1	5–4	

Source: tff.org (in Turkish)
Legend: Blue = home team win; Yellow = draw; Red = away team win.

==== Top goalscorers ====
As of 11 May 2015.

Rank	Player	Club	Goals
1	(Turkey) Murat Uluç	Hatayspor	20
2	(Turkey) Adem Çalık	Tepecikspor A.Ş.	15
3	(Turkey) Eser Yayla	Sarıyer	13
3	(Turkey) Gökhan Erdöl	Birlik Nakliyat Düzyurtspor	13
3	(Turkey) Onur Garip	Kırklarelispor	13
3	(Turkey) Sinan Kurumuş	Tepecikspor A.Ş.	13
3	(Turkey) Timur Kosovalı	Göztepe A.Ş.	13
8	(Turkey) Eren Açıkgöz	Nazilli Belediyespor	12
8	(Turkey) Muharrem Ozan Cengiz	Bandırmaspor	12
8	(Turkey) Şehmus Özer	Diyarbakır BB	12

== Promotion playoffs ==
=== Quarterfinals ===
Team 1	Agg.	Team 2	1st leg	2nd leg
Menemen Belediyespor	1–2	Pendikspor	0–0	1–2
1461 Trabzon	2–1	Ümraniyespor	2–0	0–1
Sarıyer	2–3	Bandırmaspor	0–0	2–3
İnegölspor	1–0	Hatayspor	1–0	0–0

==== First legs ====
7 May 2015	Menemen Belediyespor	0–0	Pendikspor	Menemen Town Stadium
16:30 CET+3		Report		Attendance: 2.000; Referee: Abdullah Yılmaz

7 May 2015	1461 Trabzon	2–0	Ümraniyespor	Ahmet Suat Özyazıcı Stadium
16:30 CET+3	Yaser 5'; Emrullah 90+3' (pen.)	Report		Attendance: 5.000; Referee: Hüseyin Sabancı

7 May 2015	Sarıyer	0–0	Bandırmaspor	Yusuf Ziya Öniş Stadium
16:30 CET+3		Report		Attendance: 4.500; Referee: Murat Türker

7 May 2015	İnegölspor	1–0	Hatayspor	İnegöl Town Stadium
16:30 CET+3	Yasin 37'	Report		Attendance: 4.000; Referee: Murat Özcan

==== Second legs ====
11 May 2015	Pendikspor	2–1	Menemen Belediyespor	Pendik Stadium
16:30 CET+3	İlhan 11'; İlyas 76'	Report	Efe 20'	Attendance: 2.300; Referee: Sarper Barış Saka

11 May 2015	Ümraniyespor	1–0	1461 Trabzon	Ümraniye Town Stadium
16:30 CET+3	Tahir 9'	Report		Attendance: 446; Referee: Murat Türker

11 May 2015	Bandırmaspor	3–2	Sarıyer	Bandırma 17 Eylül Stadium
16:30 CET+3	Hacı Mustafa 45'; Furkan 54'; Talha 77' (pen.)	Report	Eser 53' (pen.); Yaşar 58'	Attendance: 5.400; Referee: Hüseyin Sabancı

11 May 2015	Hatayspor	0–0	İnegölspor	Hatay Atatürk Stadium
16:30 CET+3		Report		Attendance: 6.000; Referee: Abdullah Yılmaz

=== Semifinals ===
Team 1	Agg.	Team 2	1st leg	2nd leg
1461 Trabzon	5–4	Pendikspor	2–1	3–3
İnegölspor	1–0	Bandırmaspor	1–0	0–0

==== First legs ====
15 May 2015	1461 Trabzon	2–1	Pendikspor	Ahmet Suat Özyazıcı Stadium
16:30 CET+3	Mustafa 14'; Batuhan 68'	Report	Uğur 79'	Attendance: 1.500; Referee: Kutluhan Bilgiç

15 May 2015	İnegölspor	1–0	Bandırmaspor	İnegöl Town Stadium
16:30 CET+3	Ersel 45'	Report		Attendance: 4.900; Referee: Bülent Birincioğlu

==== Second legs ====
19 May 2015	Pendikspor	3–3	1461 Trabzon	Pendik Stadium
16:30 CET+3	İlhan 45'; Hakan 52'; Uğur 64'	Report	Mustafa 2', 32'; Hamza 21'	Attendance: 2.400; Referee: Mustafa Öğretmenoğlu

19 May 2015	Bandırmaspor	0–0	İnegölspor	Bandırma 17 Eylül Stadium
16:30 CET+3		Report		Attendance: 10.000; Referee: Abdulkadir Bitigen

=== Finals ===
Team 1	Score	Team 2
1461 Trabzon	2–2 (4–2 p)	İnegölspor

25 May 2015	1461 Trabzon	2–2 (a.e.t.) (2–2 agg.) (4–2 p)	İnegölspor	Alanya Oba Stadium
19:00 CET+3	Hamza 50', 69'	Report	Okan 56'; Mahmut 79'	Attendance: 2.000; Referee: Bülent Yıldırım
	Penalties
	Emrullah (penalty scored); Batuhan (penalty scored); Ali Han (penalty scored); Okan (penalty scored)		Kemal (penalty scored); Ersel (penalty missed); Mahmut (penalty scored); Raif (penalty missed)

== See also ==
- 2014–15 Turkish Cup
- 2014–15 Süper Lig
- 2014–15 TFF First League
- 2014–15 TFF Third League
