= 2013–14 TFF 2. Lig =

Second League
- Season: 2013-2014
- Champions: White Group League; Giresunspor; Red Group League; Altınordu
- Promoted: Giresunspor; Altınordu; Alanyaspor
- Relegated: Çanakkale Dardanelspor; Gaziosmanpaşa; Çankırı Belediyespor; Eyüpspor; İstanbul Güngörenspor; Bozüyükspor
- Matches: White Group League; 306; Red Group League; 306; Promotion Playoffs; 13
- Top goalscorer: (Turkey) Gökhan Karadeniz; Altınordu

The 2013–14 Second League (known as the Spor Toto 2. Lig for sponsorship reasons) is the third level in the Turkish football. The season began on 8 September 2013 and will end on 11 May 2014. In end of the 2013-2014 season, 4 teams (2 teams in each group) relegate to TFF Third League and 6 teams promote from TFF Third League.

== Teams ==
Locations of teams in 2013–14 TFF Second League
EYP=Eyüpspor, SAR=Sarıyer, GOP=Gaziosmanpaşa, GUN=Güngörenspor, BAY=Bayrampaşaspor, PEN=Pendikspor, KAR=Kartalspor

== White Group League table ==
Pos	Team	Pld	W	D	L	GF	GA	GD	Pts	Qualification or relegation
1	Giresunspor (C, P)	34	20	7	7	55	33	+22	67	Promotion to TFF First League
2	Göztepe A.Ş.	34	18	12	4	51	27	+24	66	Qualification for Promotion Playoffs
3	Hatayspor	34	18	9	7	50	30	+20	63	Qualification for Promotion Playoffs
4	Yeni Malatyaspor	34	16	10	8	50	34	+16	58	Qualification for Promotion Playoffs
5	Kartalspor	34	16	10	8	49	33	+16	58	Qualification for Promotion Playoffs
6	Pendikspor	34	15	11	8	43	31	+12	56	
7	İnegölspor	34	15	9	10	46	33	+13	54	
8	Aydınspor 1923	34	11	13	10	43	38	+5	46	
9	Turgutluspor	34	10	13	11	43	43	0	43	
10	Gümüşhanespor	34	9	13	12	31	32	−1	40	
11	Kırklarelispor	34	9	11	14	34	51	−17	38	
12	Tokatspor	34	10	8	16	39	57	−18	38	
13	Konya Anadolu Selçukspor	34	8	12	14	31	39	−8	36	
14	Sarıyer	34	6	16	12	38	48	−10	34	
15	Tarsus İ.Y.	34	7	12	15	32	50	−18	33	
16	Çanakkale Dardanelspor (R)	34	6	14	14	29	40	−11	32	Relegation to TFF Third League
17	Gaziosmanpaşa (R)	34	5	13	16	33	52	−19	28	Relegation to TFF Third League
18	Çankırı Belediyespor (R)	34	4	13	17	17	43	−26	25	Relegation to TFF Third League

Source: TFF Second League page
Rules for classification: 1) points; 2) goal difference; 3) number of goals scored.
(C) Champions; (P) Promoted; (R) Relegated

=== Top goalscorers ===
As of 21 May 2014.

Rank	Player	Club	Goals
1	(Turkey) Raif Demir	İnegölspor	16
2	(Turkey) Ergün Çakır	Giresunspor	15
3	(Turkey) Arif Çoban	Pendikspor	14
3	(Turkey) Ersel Aslıyüksek	Kartalspor	14
5	(Turkey) Şaban Genişyürek	Göztepe	13
6	(Turkey) Eren Açıkgöz	Kırklarelispor	12
6	(Turkey) Samed Kartal	Giresunspor	12
8	(Turkey) Cihan Yilmaz	Göztepe	11
9	(Turkey) Cemre Atmaca	Sarıyer	9
9	(Turkey) Güney Atılgan	Hatayspor	9

== Red Group League table ==
Pos	Team	Pld	W	D	L	GF	GA	GD	Pts	Qualification or relegation
1	Altınordu A.Ş. (C, P)	34	25	6	3	77	23	+54	81	Promotion to TFF First League
2	Alanyaspor (P)	34	22	6	6	76	35	+41	72	Qualification for Promotion Playoffs
3	MKE Ankaragücü	34	22	5	7	77	30	+47	71	Qualification for Promotion Playoffs
4	Bandırmaspor	34	18	7	9	68	48	+20	61	Qualification for Promotion Playoffs
5	Amed	34	17	9	8	40	31	+9	60	Qualification for Promotion Playoffs
6	Tepecikspor A.Ş.	34	15	7	12	41	43	−2	52	
7	Nazilli Belediyespor	34	13	11	10	41	39	+2	50	
8	Bugsaşspor	34	13	8	13	50	43	+7	47	
9	Kocaeli Birlik Spor	34	13	5	16	55	56	−1	44	
10	Ofspor A.Ş.	34	11	10	13	45	54	−9	43	
11	Pazarspor	34	13	3	18	40	55	−15	42	
12	Altay	34	11	9	14	50	52	−2	42	
13	Bayrampaşaspor	34	11	8	15	37	56	−19	41	
14	Gölbaşıspor A.Ş.	34	11	4	19	43	53	−10	37	
15	Körfez İskenderun Spor	34	9	10	15	34	46	−12	37	
16	Eyüpspor (R)	34	9	9	16	36	61	−25	36	Relegation to TFF Third League
17	Güngörenspor (R)	34	7	6	21	27	54	−27	27	Relegation to TFF Third League
18	Bozüyükspor (R)	34	2	5	27	21	79	−58	11	Relegation to TFF Third League

Source: TFF Second League page
Rules for classification: 1) points; 2) goal difference; 3) number of goals scored.
(C) Champions; (P) Promoted; (R) Relegated

=== Top goalscorers ===
As of 21 May 2014.

Rank	Player	Club	Goals
1	(Turkey) Gökhan Karadeniz	Altınordu	27
2	(Turkey) Timur Kosovalı	Bandırmaspor	22
3	(Turkey) Mehmet Umut Nayir	Ankaragücü	19
4	(Turkey) Uğur Erdoğan	Körfez Belediyespor	18
5	(Turkey) Emre Akbaba	Alanyaspor	15
5	(Turkey) Levent Kale	Ankaragücü	15
7	(Turkey) Gökhan Kaba	Alanyaspor	14
8	(Turkey) Tayfur Bingöl	Bandırmaspor	13
9	(Turkey) Aydın Çetin	Alanyaspor	12
9	(Turkey) Hakkı İsmet Şimşek	Bandırmaspor	12

== Promotion playoffs ==
=== Quarterfinals ===
Team 1	Agg.	Team 2	1st leg	2nd leg
Kartalspor	0–3	Göztepe	0–1	0–2
Yeni Malatyaspor	2–4	Hatayspor	1–0	1–4
Diyarbakır B.B.	0–2	Alanyaspor	0–1	0–1
Bandırmaspor	1–2	Ankaragücü	1–0	0–2

==== First legs ====
16 May 2014	Kartalspor	0–1	Göztepe	Kartal Stadium, Istanbul
16:30 CET+3		(Report)	Tolga Cavdar 10'

16 May 2014	Yeni Malatyaspor	1–0	Hatayspor	Malatya İnönü Stadium, Malatya
16:30 CET+3	Muharrem Cengiz 75'	(Report)

16 May 2014	Diyarbakır B.B.	0–1	Alanyaspor	Seyrantepe, Diyarbakır
16:30 CET+3		(Report)	Timuçin Aşçıgil 62'

16 May 2014	Bandırmaspor	1–0	Ankaragücü	17 Eylül Stadium, Bandırma
16:30 CET+3	Onur Bilgen 90+3'	(Report)

==== Second legs ====
20 May 2014	Göztepe	2–0	Kartalspor	İzmir Atatürk Stadium
16:30 CET+3	Volkan Altın 75'; Furkan Alakmak 78'	(Report)

20 May 2014	Hatayspor	4–1	Yeni Malatyaspor	Hatay Atatürk, Hatay
16:30 CET+3	Halil Karataş 9', 73', 84'; Taylan Uzunoğlu 90+2'	(Report)	Hüseyin Kar 32'

20 May 2014	Alanyaspor	1–0	Diyarbakır B.B.	Alanya Milli Egemenlik, Alanya, Antalya
16:30 CET+3	Kerem Gulbahar 22'	(Report)

20 May 2014	Ankaragücü	2–0	Bandırmaspor	Ankara 19 Mayıs Stadium, Ankara
16:30 CET+3	Serhat Gülpınar 35'; Umut Nayir 74'	(Report)

=== Semifinals ===
Team 1	Agg.	Team 2	1st leg	2nd leg
Hatayspor	(a)3–3	Göztepe	2–0	1–3
Ankaragücü	2–4	Alanyaspor	0–1	2–3

==== First legs ====
23 May 2014	Hatayspor	2-0	Göztepe	Hatay Atatürk, Hatay
17:30 CET+3	Ömer Bozan 64'; Taylan Uzunoğlu 76'	(Report)

23 May 2014	Ankaragücü	0-1	Alanyaspor	Ankara 19 Mayıs Stadium, Ankara
17:30 CET+3		(Report)	Aydın Çetin 80'

==== Second legs ====
27 May 2014	Göztepe	3-1	Hatayspor	İzmir Atatürk Stadium
17:30 CET+3	Enes Kubat 70'; Şaban Genişyürek 83', 90'	(Report)	Taylan Uzunoğlu 26'

27 May 2014	Alanyaspor	3-2	Ankaragücü	Alanya Milli Egemenlik, Alanya, Antalya
17:30 CET+3	Aydın Çetin 27', 65', 71'	(Report)	Umut Nayir 22'; Kaan Kanak 29'

=== Final ===
31 May 2014
19:00 CET+3

Hatayspor	0-0 (a.e.t.)	Alanyaspor
	(Report)
Penalties
Halil Karataş (penalty scored); Emre Özkurt (penalty scored); Soner Ergençay (penalty scored)	3–4	(penalty scored) Emre Akbaba; (penalty scored) Şamil Unal; (penalty scored) Gökhan Kaba; (penalty scored) Aydın Çetin

Atatürk Olympic Stadium, Istanbul
