= 2016–17 TFF 2. Lig =

Second League
- Season: 2016-2017
- Champions: White Group; İstanbulspor; Red Group; MKE Ankaragücü
- Promoted: İstanbulspor; MKE Ankaragücü; Erzurum BB
- Relegated: Anadolu Üsküdar 1908; Tepecikspor; Ofspor; Aydınspor; 1461 Trabzon; Kayseri Erciyesspor

The 2016–17 Second League (known as the Spor Toto 2. Lig for sponsorship reasons) is the third level in the Turkish football.

== Teams ==
- 1461 Trabzon, Kayseri Erciyesspor and Karşıyaka relegated from 2015–16 TFF First League.
- Ümraniyespor, Manisaspor and Bandırmaspor promoted to 2016–17 TFF First League.
- Erzurum BB, Etimesgut Belediyespor, Kastamonuspor, Zonguldak Kömürspor, Ofspor and Niğde Belediyespor promoted from 2015–16 TFF Third League.
- Bayrampaşaspor, Pazarspor, Orduspor, Kartalspor, Ankara Demirspor and Tarsus İY relegated to 2016–17 TFF Third League.

== Locations ==
Locations of teams in 2016–17 TFF Second League
Istanbul TFF Second League football clubs

== White Group ==
=== League table ===
Pos	Team	Pld	W	D	L	GF	GA	GD	Pts	Qualification or relegation
1	İstanbulspor (P)	34	21	5	8	48	22	+26	68	Promotion to TFF First League
2	Amed	34	19	9	6	51	31	+20	66	Qualification to Promotion Playoffs
3	Erzurum BB (P)	34	17	10	7	56	33	+23	61	Qualification to Promotion Playoffs
4	Kocaeli Birlikspor	34	16	8	10	40	35	+5	56	Qualification to Promotion Playoffs
5	Sivas Belediyespor	34	14	11	9	44	35	+9	53	Qualification to Promotion Playoffs
6	Nazilli Belediyespor	34	13	10	11	41	44	−3	49 (Note: Nazilli Belediyespor ahead of Keçiörengücü on head-to-head points: Nazilli Belediyespor 2-1 Keçiörengücü, Keçiörengücü 0-0 Nazilli Belediyespor)	
7	Keçiörengücü	34	13	10	11	51	48	+3	49	
8	Zonguldak Kömürspor	34	12	11	11	48	42	+6	47	
9	Hacettepe	34	11	11	12	39	35	+4	44 (Note: Hacettepe ahead of Pendikspor on overall goal difference: Hacettepe 3-2 Pendikspor, Pendikspor 1-0 Hacettepe (Both teams are equal in head-to-head points))	
10	Pendikspor	34	12	8	14	43	47	−4	44	
11	Anadolu Selçukspor	34	12	6	16	31	40	−9	42 (Note: Anadolu Selçukspor ahead of Fatih Karagümrük on head-to-head points: Anadolu Selçukspor 3-2 Fatih Karagümrük, Fatih Karagümrük 0-1 Anadolu Selçukspor)	
12	Fatih Karagümrük	34	11	9	14	39	42	−3	42	
13	Bucaspor (Note: Bucaspor was deducted 3 points.)	34	12	7	15	43	55	−12	40 (Note: Bucaspor ahead of Kahramanmaraşspor on head-to-head points: Bucaspor 1-1 Kahramanmaraşspor, Kahramanmaraşspor 1-2 Bucaspor)	
14	Kahramanmaraşspor	34	9	13	12	37	43	−6	40	
15	Fethiyespor	34	9	11	14	35	44	−9	38	
16	Anadolu Üsküdar 1908 (R)	34	8	13	13	34	43	−9	37	Relegation to TFF Third League
17	Tepecikspor (R)	34	9	5	20	42	58	−16	32	Relegation to TFF Third League
18	Ofspor (R)	34	7	5	22	30	55	−25	26	Relegation to TFF Third League

Source: TFF Second League page (in Turkish)
(P) Promoted; (R) Relegated

== Red Group ==
=== League table ===
Pos	Team	Pld	W	D	L	GF	GA	GD	Pts	Qualification or relegation
1	MKE Ankaragücü (P)	34	22	6	6	58	28	+30	72	Promotion to TFF First League
2	Gümüşhanespor	34	20	5	9	53	29	+24	65	Qualification to Promotion Playoffs
3	Kastamonuspor	34	17	9	8	54	33	+21	60	Qualification to Promotion Playoffs
4	Hatayspor	34	16	11	7	39	25	+14	59	Qualification to Promotion Playoffs
5	Menemen Belediyespor	34	15	13	6	65	45	+20	58	Qualification to Promotion Playoffs
6	Karşıyaka	34	16	6	12	58	42	+16	54	
7	Sarıyer	34	14	9	11	50	41	+9	51 (Note: Sarıyer ahead of Etimesgut Belediyespor on head-to-head points: Sarıyer 1-0 Etimesgut Belediyespor, Etimesgut Belediyespor 1-2 Sarıyer)	
8	Etimesgut Belediyespor	34	15	6	13	41	32	+9	51	
9	Niğde Belediyespor	34	12	10	12	32	34	−2	46	
10	Eyüpspor	34	13	5	16	49	64	−15	44	
11	Tokatspor	34	10	12	12	34	37	−3	42	
12	İnegölspor	34	9	14	11	42	43	−1	41	
13	Tuzlaspor	34	10	9	15	36	42	−6	39	
14	Kırklarelispor	34	9	11	14	39	44	−5	38	
15	Bugsaşspor	34	7	16	11	33	37	−4	37 (Note: Bugsaşspor ahead of Aydınspor on overall goal difference: Bugsaşspor 0-1 Aydınspor, Aydınspor 0-1 Bugsaşspor (Both teams are equal in head-to-head points))	
16	Aydınspor (R)	34	9	10	15	38	48	−10	37	Relegation to TFF Third League
17	1461 Trabzon (R)	34	6	15	13	44	50	−6	33	Relegation to TFF Third League
18	Kayseri Erciyesspor (Note: Kayseri Erciyesspor was deducted 9 points.) (R)	34	1	3	30	21	112	−91	−3	Relegation to TFF Third League

Source: TFF Second League page (in Turkish)
(P) Promoted; (R) Relegated

== Promotion playoffs ==
=== Quarterfinals ===
Team 1	Agg.	Team 2	1st leg	2nd leg
Kocaeli Birlikspor	2–4	Erzurum BB	1–2	1–2
Sivas Belediyespor	1–1	Amed	1–1	0–0
Hatayspor	1–1 (2–3 p)	Kastamonuspor	0–1	1–0
Menemen Belediyespor	4–5	Gümüşhanespor	1–2	3–3

=== Semifinals ===
Team 1	Agg.	Team 2	1st leg	2nd leg
Erzurum BB	2–1	Amed	1–0	1–1
Kastamonuspor	3–4	Gümüşhanespor	2–2	1–2

=== Final ===
Team 1	Score	Team 2
Erzurum BB	1–0	Gümüşhanespor

== See also ==
- 2016–17 Turkish Cup
- 2016–17 Süper Lig
- 2016–17 TFF First League
- 2016–17 TFF Third League
