= Burak Uça =

Turkish-German footballer

Personal information
- Full name: Mehmet Burak Kağan Uça
- Date of birth: 8 December 1989 (age 36)
- Place of birth: Mönchengladbach, West Germany
- Height: 1.78 m (5 ft 10 in)
- Positions: Forward; winger

Youth career
- Rheydter SV
- –2008: 1. FC Mönchengladbach

Senior career*
Years	Team	Apps	(Gls)
2008–2009	1. FC Mönchengladbach		
2009–2010	Wuppertaler SV II		
2010	Wuppertaler SV	4	(0)
2010–2012	Göztepe	5	(1)
2011–2012	→ Altay (loan)	7	(0)
2013	1. FC Mönchengladbach		
2013–2015	Alanyaspor	43	(11)
2015–2017	İnegölspor	28	(2)
2017–2018	Silivrispor	6	(0)
2018	SV Straelen	7	(0)
2020–2022	1. FC Mönchengladbach		
- * Club domestic league appearances and goals

Mehmet Burak Kağan Uça (born 8 December 1989) is a Turkish-German footballer who plays as a forward or winger.
