= Reyhanlı Belediyespor =

- Full name: Reyhanlı Belediyespor
- Founded: 1923
- Ground: Reyhanlı Tayfur Sökmen Stadium, Reyhanlı / Hatay
- Chairman: Hüseyin Şahbaz
- Manager: Mehmet Öz
- League: Hatay Amateur Leagues
Home colours	Away colours

Reyhanlı Belediyespor is a football club located in Hatay, Turkey. The team competes in Turkish Regional Amateur League.

== League participations ==
- TFF Second League: 1986–1987,
- TFF Third League: 1984–1986, 1987–1992
- Turkish Regional Amateur League: 2013–2015
- Hatay Amateur Leagues: 1992–2013, 2015–present

== League performances ==
Season	League	Pos	Pld	W	D	L	PF	PA	Pts
1984–85	TFF Third League – 8th Group	4	18	7	7	4	19	17	21
1985–86	TFF Third League – 3rd Group	1	24	15	6	3	34	17	36
1986–87	TFF Second League – Group A	15	32	7	13	12	22	43	27
1987–88	TFF Third League – 3rd Group	8	32	11	10	11	29	35	43
1988–89	TFF Third League – 3rd Group	11	30	8	8	14	32	47	32
1989–90	TFF Third League – 3rd Group	9	32	10	9	13	43	48	39
1990–91	TFF Third League – 3rd Group	12	34	11	6	17	39	58	39
1991–92	TFF Third League – 3rd Group	19	36	7	6	23	35	80	27
2013–14	Turkish Regional Amateur League – 3rd Group	3	28	17	5	6	47	29	56
	Turkish Regional Amateur League Play-out	Winner	1	1	0	0	2	1	3
2014–15	Turkish Regional Amateur League – 4th Group	12	26	4	6	16	23	49	18
	Turkish Regional Amateur League Play-out	Loser	1	0	0	1	0	1	0
2016–17	Turkish Regional Amateur League Play-out	Loser	1	0	0	1	0	1	0

Promotion
Relegation

Source: TFF: Reyhanli Belediyespor
