= Belen Belediyespor =

- Full name: Belen Belediyespor
- Chairman: Metin Yücelen
- Manager: Bilal Özdemir
- League: Turkish Regional Amateur League

Belen Belediyespor is a football club located in Belen near Hatay, southern Turkey. The team competes in Turkish Regional Amateur League.

== League participations ==
- Turkish Regional Amateur League: 2015–present

== League performances ==
Season	League	Pos	Pld	W	D	L	PF	PA	Pts
2015–16	Turkish Regional Amateur League – 2nd Group	9	24	7	6	11	32	45	27
2016–17	Turkish Regional Amateur League – 5th Group	9	24	9	3	12	34	45	30
2017–18	Turkish Regional Amateur League								

Promotion
Relegation
