= Dörtyol Gençlerbirliği =

- Full name: Dörtyol Gençlerbirliği
- Founded: 1988
- Chairman: A.Rıza Günaydın
- League: Turkish Regional Amateur League
- 2014–15: 4th

Dörtyol Gençlerbirliği is a football club located in Dörtyol near Hatay, southern Turkey. The team competes in Turkish Regional Amateur League.

== League participations ==
- Turkish Regional Amateur League: 2014–present

== League performances ==
| Season | League | Pos | Pld | W | D | L | PF | PA | Pts |
|---|---|---|---|---|---|---|---|---|---|
| 2014–15 | Turkish Regional Amateur League – 4th Group | 4 | 26 | 11 | 9 | 6 | 28 | 23 | 42 |
| 2015–16 | Turkish Regional Amateur League | Withdrew | | | | | | | |

| Promotion |
| Relegation |

Source: TFF: Dörtyol Gençlerbirliği
