= Asaşspor 1972 =

- Full name: Asaşspor 1972
- Founded: 1976
- Chairman: Zekeriya Göçmen
- League: Hatay Amateur Leagues
- 2014–15: TBD

Asaşspor 1972 is a football club located in İskenderun near Hatay, southern Turkey. The team competes in Hatay Amateur Leagues.

== League participations ==
- Turkish Regional Amateur League: 2011–2012
- Hatay Amateur Leagues: 2012–present

== League performances ==
Season	League	Pos	Pld	W	D	L	PF	PA	Pts
2011–12	Turkish Regional Amateur League – 5th Group	6	22	7	8	7	21	27	29

Promotion
Relegation

Source: TFF: Asaşspor 1972
