= Arhavispor =

Turkish football club

- Full name: Arhavi Spor Kulübü
- Founded: 1955
- Ground: Arhavi İlçe Stadium, Arhavi, Turkey
- Capacity: 3,000
- Chairman: Hakkı Aytolan
- Manager: İsmail Demirci
- 2022-23: Turkish Regional Amateur League, Group 3, 14th
| Home colours | Away colours | Third colours |

Arhavispor is an amateur Turkish football club located in Artvin's Arhavi district. The club was formed in 1955 and plays its home matches at Arhavi Stadium. Its colours are black and yellow.

Arhavispor competed in the Turkish Regional Amateur League 3rd Group in the 2022–23 season. They were relegated from the Turkish Regional Amateur League in the 2022–23 season, finishing 14th with 0 point.
