= Tekirdağspor =

- Full name: Tekirdağ Spor Kulübü
- Nickname: Sari Siyah
- Founded: 1967
- Ground: Namık Kemal Stadyumu, Tekirdağ
- Capacity: 5,000
- Chairman: Gursal Erbap
- Manager: Kaya Tevfik Saygılı
- League: TFF Third League
- 2014–15: Turkish Regional Amateur League, 11th Group, 1st (Promoted)
- Website: http://www.tekirdagspor.org/tekirdagspor-kulubu-resmi-internet-sitesi
Home colours	Away colours

Tekirdağspor is a Turkish sports club based in Tekirdağ, mainly concentrated on football.

Tekirdağspor were crowned champions of Turkish Regional Amateur League Group 11 during the 2014–15 season.

They play in yellow and black kits.

== History ==
Founded in 1967, the club played in TFF First League (Then Second League) for 9 seasons.

== Stadium ==
Currently the team plays at the 5000 capacity Namık Kemal Stadyumu.

== League participations ==
- TFF First League: 1977–1986
- TFF Second League: 1967–1977, 1986–2001
- TFF Third League: 2001–2004, 2015–present
- Turkish Regional Amateur League: 2010–2011, 2012–2015
- Amatör Futbol Ligleri: 2004–2010, 2011–2012
