= Muratpaşa Belediyesi Spor Kulübü =

Muratpaşa Belediyespor
- Full name: Muratpaşa Belediyesi Spor Kulübü
- Founded: 1995
- Owner(s): Municipality of Muratpaşa, Antalya
- President: Özcan Yılmaz
- Website: http://www.muratpasabldspor.org/

Active branches of Muratpaşa Belediyespor
Football Men's	Football (Women's)	Basketball
Gymnastics	Handball (Women's)	Athletics

Wrestling

Muratpaşa Belediyespor (Turkish: Muratpaşa Belediyesi Spor Kulübü) is a multi-sports club established in 1995 in Antalya, Turkey by the municipality of Muratpaşa district (Turkish: Muratpaşa Belediyesi).

Muratpaşa Belediyespor's main activities are in basketball, gymnastics, handball, athletics, wrestling and football branches. The women's handball team plays in the Turkish Women's Handball Super League and became champion consecutively in the 2011–12, 2012–13 and 2013–14 seasons. The football side became champion in the 2011–12 season of Super Amateur League.
