= 1461 Trabzon F.K. =

Turkish sports club

1461 Trabzon
- Full name: 1461 Trabzon Futbol Kulübü Sportif Faaliyetler Ticaret A.Ş.
- Founded: 1986, as Düzyurtspor
- Ground: Yavuz Selim Stadium, Ortahisar
- Capacity: 1,820
- Chairman: Celil Hekimoğlu
- Manager: Muzaffer Bilazer
- League: TFF 2. Lig
- 2025–26: TFF 2. Lig, Red, 11th of 18
- Website: www.1461trabzonfk.com
Home colours	Away colours	Third colours

1461 Trabzon Futbol Kulübü, formerly Hekimoğlu Trabzon, is a Turkish sports club located in Trabzon, Turkey. The football team currently plays in the TFF Second League.

The club was previously known as Birlik Nakliyat Düzyurtspor and Baysal İnşaat Düzyurtspor.

== Stadium ==
Currently the team plays at the Yavuz Selim Stadium, which has a capacity of 1,820.

== Club names ==
- Düzyurtspor (1986–2018)
  - Birlik Nakliyat Düzyurtspor
  - Baysal İnşaat Düzyurtspor
- Hekimoğlu Trabzon (2018–2021)
- 1461 Trabzon F.K. (2021–)

== League participations ==
- TFF Second League: 2014–15, 2019–
- TFF Third League: 2013–14, 2015–19
- Turkish Regional Amateur League: 2011–13
- Turkish Amateur Football Leagues: 1986–2011
