= Diyarbekirspor =

Turkish football club

- Full name: Diyarbekirspor Kulübü Anonim Şirketi
- Founded: 1977; 49 years ago
- Ground: Diyarbakır Stadium; Diyarbakır, Turkey
- Capacity: 33,000
- Manager: Zafer Şahin
- League: TFF Second League
Home colours	Away colours

Diyarbekirspor is a Turkish professional football club located in the city of Diyarbakır. Their colours are red and green, and they play their home matches at Diyarbakır Stadium.

== History ==
The club which was formed as Tarım Doğanspor in 1977, then renamed to Beşyüzevlerspor in 1986, was active in the Diyarbakır Amateur League. In 2010, Bedirhan Akyol, club's chairman since 1986, reestablished the club as Yeni Diyarbakırspor to compete in the Turkish Regional Amateur League until 2013, when they managed to secure promotion to the TFF Third League. In 2015, the club adopted Diyarbekirspor as their new name.

After four play-offs finals, Diyarbekirspor finished top of the 2020–21 TFF Third League season, and were promoted to the TFF Second League. Following the 2023 Turkey–Syria earthquake, the club decided to withdraw from the rest of the 2022–23 season.

== Honours ==
- TFF Third League
  - Winners: 2020–21
  - Play-off final: 2013–14, 2015–16, 2016–17, 2017–18
  - Play-off semi-finals: 2014–15
- Turkish Regional Amateur League
  - Winners: 2012–13
  - Play-off final: 2011–12
- Diyarbakır 1st Amateur League
  - Winners: 2010–11
