= Sancaktepe FK =

Turkish football club

- Full name: Sancaktepe Futbol Kulubu
- Nickname: SFK
- Founded: 2008
- Ground: Sancaktepe Stadium, Sancaktepe
- Capacity: 2,581
- Chairman: Fatih Kol
- Manager: Atilla Cebi
- League: Turkish Regional Amateur League
- 2021–22: TFF 3. Lig, Group 1, 18th (relegated)
- Website: https://sancaktepefk.com.tr/
Home colours	Away colours

Sancaktepe Futbol Kulübü Anonim Şirketi is a Turkish football club located in Sancaktepe, Turkey.

== History ==
The club was founded in 2008 under the name Samandıraspor, and changed its name to Sancaktepe Gençlikspor the following season as they were promoted to the TFF Third League. In the 2016–17 season, under the name Sancaktepe Belediyespor, the club gained promotion into the TFF Second League. At the beginning of the 2019–20 season, the team once more changed its name to Sancaktepe FK as it left the municipality and moved to a joint-stock company structure.

== Colours and badge ==
The club's colours are red and white.

== Current squad ==
As of 12 December 2020

Note: Flags indicate national team as defined under FIFA eligibility rules; some limited exceptions apply. Players may hold more than one non-FIFA nationality.

No.	Pos.	Nation	Player
—	GK	TUR	Ahmed Furkan Özdemir
—	GK	TUR	Emre Satılmış
—	GK	TUR	Hüseyin Yılmaz
—	DF	TUR	Mehmet Abdullah Çoban
—	DF	TUR	Erdinç Pekgöz
—	DF	TUR	Semih Intepe
—	DF	TUR	Yaup Yiğit
—	DF	TUR	Alp Han Çetinkaya
—	DF	TUR	Mustafa Melih Parlak
—	MF	AZE	Kazım Birkan

No.	Pos.	Nation	Player
—	MF	TUR	Orkun Tırpancı
—	MF	TUR	Behlül Aydın
—	MF	TUR	Selim Kayacı
—	MF	TUR	Halil İbrahim Tuna
—	MF	TUR	Ahmet Abdullah Çakmak
—	MF	TUR	Feridun Kıroğlu
—	MF	TUR	Ulaş Şimşek
—	MF	TUR	Serkan Yücel

== Honours ==
- TFF Third League
  - Champions (1): 2016–17
