= Körfez SK =

Turkish sports club

- Full name: Körfez Spor Kulübü
- Nickname(s): Red Dragons
- Founded: 1995
- Ground: Alparslan Türkeş Stadium, Körfez, Kocaeli
- Capacity: 1,790
- Chairman: Erhan Yilmaz
- Manager: Murat Gündoğdu
- League: Turkish Regional Amateur League
- 2018–19: TFF Third League, Group 1, 17th (relegated)
- Website: http://www.kocaelibirlikspor.org/
Home colours	Away colours

Körfez SK, formerly Kocaeli Birlik Spor, is a Turkish sports club from Körfez, Kocaeli Province. After five years playing non-league football, the club gained a place back in the Third League for the 2007–08 season. That year they gained another promotion. From the 2008–09 season, the team has competed in the TFF Second League 1st group.

In 2010, the club was renamed from Körfez Belediyespor to Körfez SK.
