= Çine Madranspor =

Turkish football club

- Full name: Çine Madran Sor Kulübü
- Founded: 1926
- Ground: Yüksel Yalova Stadium, Çine/Aydın
- Capacity: 10.988
- Chairman: Ali Örter
- Manager: Gürkan Ferhatoğlu
- League: Regional Amateur League
- 2014–15: TBD

Çine Madranspor is a football club located in Aydın, Turkey. The team competes in the Regional Amateur League. The club was promoted to the TFF Third League after 2013–14 season.

== League participations ==
- TFF Second League: 1984–1987
- TFF Third League: 2014–present
- Turkish Regional Amateur League: 2010–2014

== Stadium ==
Currently the team plays at the 15,000 capacity Yüksel Yalova Stadium.

== Current squad ==
As of 17 May 2020.

Note: Flags indicate national team as defined under FIFA eligibility rules; some limited exceptions apply. Players may hold more than one non-FIFA nationality.

No.	Pos.	Nation	Player
—	GK	TUR	Halim Altas
—	GK	TUR	Emre Kizilboga
—	GK	TUR	Sefa Ufuk Celtik
—	FW	TUR	Refik Koray Kocademir
—	FW	TUR	Erhan Güzel
