= Bucaspor 1928 =

Turkish football club

- Full name: Bucaspor 1928 Anonim Şirketi
- Founded: 2011; 15 years ago
- Ground: Yeni Buca
- Capacity: 8,810
- Chairman: Cihan Aktaş
- Manager: Cüneyt Dumlupınar
- League: TFF 3. Lig
- 2025–26: TFF 2. Lig, White, 19th of 19 (relegated)
Home colours	Away colours

Bucaspor 1928 is a Turkish football club located in Buca, İzmir. The team competes in the TFF Second League, the third tier of Turkish football.

== History ==
Bucaspor 1928 was founded in 2011 as İzmir İl Özel İdarespor. Prior to the 2013–14 season it changed its name into Tire 1922 Spor. Cihan Aktaş acquired the shares of the club in 2019 and changed the club name in Buca Futbol Kulübü. However, this was not approved by the Turkish Football Association (TFF). Consequently, the name Ci Group Buca was chosen. In February 2020 the club became 1928 Bucaspor before getting its current name Bucaspor 1928 as of May 2021. The club also gained the right to use the logo of Bucaspor.

== League participations ==
- TFF Second League: 2021–
- TFF Third League: 2014–21
- Turkish Regional Amateur League (BAL): 2012–2014
- Turkish Amateur Football Leagues : 2011–2012

== Stadium ==
Yeni Buca with 8,810 seats is the homeground of the club. Before relocating to Buca in 2019, the club played in Tire, İzmir at the Tire Arena Stadium, and previously the Tire 4 Eylül Stadium.

== Current squad ==
As of 6 December 2025

Note: Flags indicate national team as defined under FIFA eligibility rules; some limited exceptions apply. Players may hold more than one non-FIFA nationality.

No.	Pos.	Nation	Player
1	GK	TUR	Berkin Özgür
5	DF	TUR	Muzaffer Buğra Hotur
6	MF	TUR	Ahmet Yusuf Geçgel
7	FW	TUR	Sercan Deniz
8	MF	TUR	Osman Işıklı
9	FW	TUR	Berke Örer
10	FW	TUR	Buğra Akçagün
14	MF	TUR	Yılmaz Özeren
15	DF	TUR	Hasancan Yıldız
17	DF	TUR	Umut Hepdemirgil
18	FW	TUR	Aybars Gök
22	DF	TUR	Arda Koca

No.	Pos.	Nation	Player
23	MF	TUR	Murat Komili
25	GK	TUR	Berk Cem Beyaztaş
35	DF	TUR	Doğan Çamlı
47	DF	TUR	Şerif Doğan
54	DF	TUR	Emir Bilgin
61	FW	TUR	Ali Emir Pervanlar
63	FW	TUR	Burak Bozkuyu
77	FW	TUR	Yağız Mete Daş
78	DF	TUR	Dorukhan Dülger
87	MF	TUR	Oğuz Taylan Caner
91	DF	TUR	Buğra Çiçek
