= Profesyonelliğe Geçiş Ligi =

- Organising body: Turkish Football Federation (TFF)
- Founded: 2010; 15 years ago
- Country: Turkey
- Confederation: UEFA
- Number of clubs: 153
- Level on pyramid: 5
- Promotion to: 3. Lig
- Relegation to: Super Amateur Leagues
- Website: Turkish Professional Transition League
- Current: 2026–27 Profesyonelliğe Geçiş Ligi

The Profesyonelliğe Geçiş Ligi (PGL, English: Professional Transition League), formerly known as Bölgesel Amatör Lig (BAL, English: Regional Amateur League) is the fifth tier of the Turkish football league system. The tier comprises a number (usually 10–13, varies by season) of groups across Turkey, each consisting of teams grouped according to the regions in which they are based. Every season, 12 teams are promoted to the TFF Third League while the bottom two teams of each group are relegated to the Super Amateur Leagues of their respective provinces.

== League status ==
Former logo

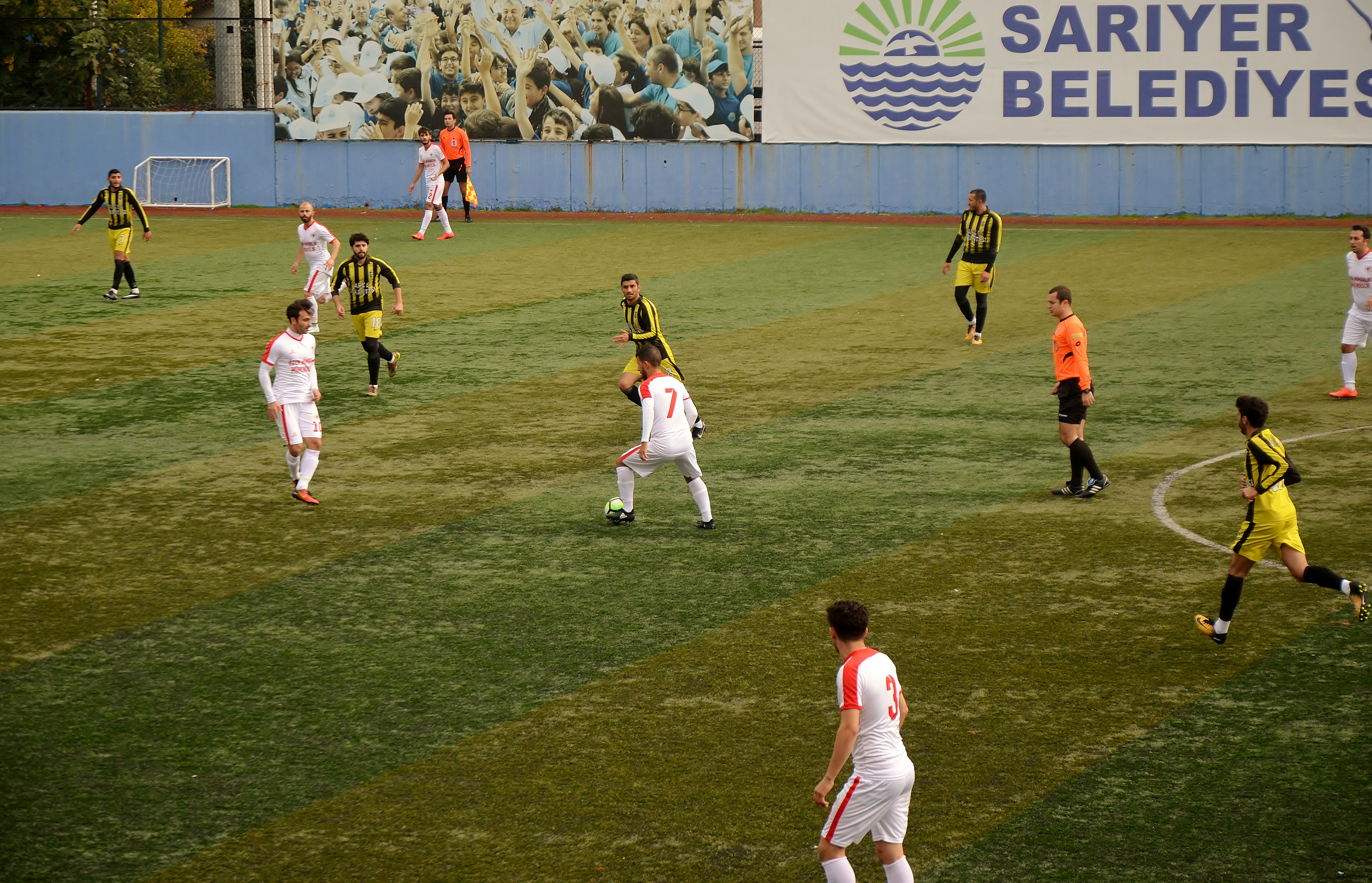
Professional Transition League (PGL) match between Özer Mimarlık Mühendislik Spor and Mahmut Şevketpaşa Spor in the 2017–18 season.

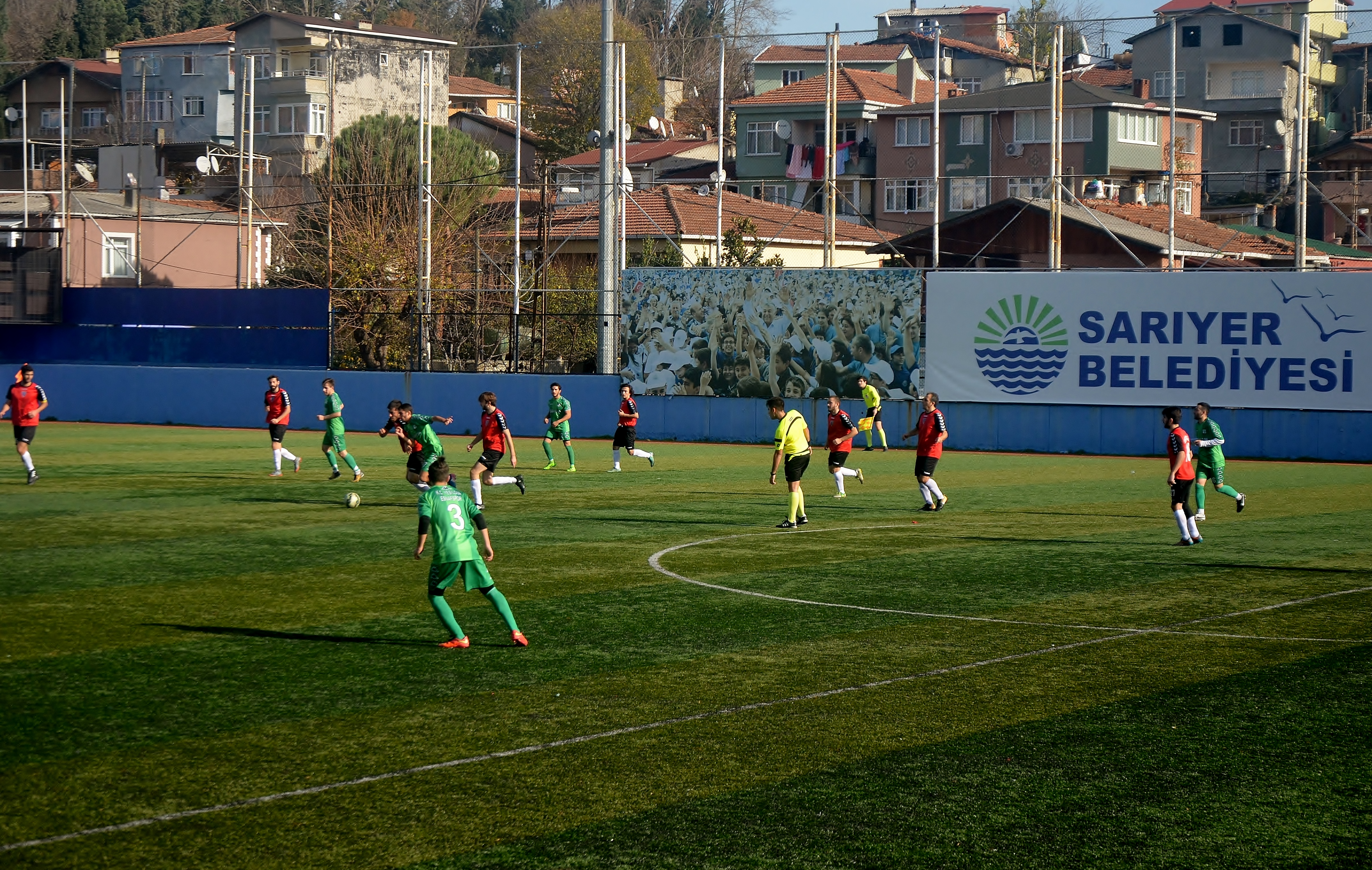
Professional Transition League (PGL) match between Boğaziçi Üniversitesi 1896 Spor and Küçükçekmece Yeşilova Spor in the 2017–18 season.

The league contains 153 teams which participate in 10 groups: 2 of these groups contain 14 teams, 4 of these groups contain 15 teams, 3 of these groups contain 16 teams and one group contains 17 teams. At the end of the season, 12 teams will be promoted to TFF Third League. 10 group winners get direct promotion. Teams ranked 2nd and 3rd of their groups will participate in a play-off between 16 teams. Only the winner of this play-off will be promoted. As for the last group, the Istanbul group will have a separate play-off between numbers 2, 3, 4 and 5. The winner of the group 10 play-off will also get promotion. The 18 teams which finish in the bottom two of their groups will be relegated to the Super Amateur Leagues, group 10 will have four teams relegated. A total of 22 teams will be relegated.

== Records ==
The Group VI match between Eskişehirspor and Manavgat Belediyespor on April 27, 2025, set the highest attendance record in the history of the Turkish Professional Transition League, with a total of 33,247 spectators. The second-highest attendance was recorded on February 8, 2015, during the match between Kocaelispor and Büyükçekmece Belediyespor, with 20,745 spectators.

== 2016–17 season ==
=== Groups ===
Key to colors
Kalan	Play-out kazananı	Play-out kaybetti	Süper Amertöre düştü

Group 1

Group 2

Group 3

Group 4

Group 5

Group 6

Group 7

Group 8

Group 9

Group 10

Group 11

Group 12

== 2015–16 season ==
The teams promoted to TFF Third League:

- 12 Bingölspor
- Elaziz Belediyespor
- Erbaaspor
- Türk Metal Kırıkkalespor
- Afjet Afyonspor
- Halide Edip Adıvarspor
- Kütahyaspor
- Muğlaspor
- Kocaelispor

=== Groups ===
Key to colors
Promoted	Play-out Winner	Play-out Loser	Relegated

Group 1
12 Bingölspor
Elbakspor
Kurtalanpor
Yüksekova Belediyespor
Tatvan Gençlerbirliği
1960 Silopispor
Ağrı Gençlerbirliği
Muş Demirspor
Diyarbakır Yolspor
Gerçüş Bağlarspor
Kızıltepe Fıratspor
Diyarbakır 1968 Spor

Group 2
Elaziz Belediyespor
Adıyaman 1954 Spor
Karaköprü Belediyespor
Malatya Yeşilyurtspor
Kilis Belediyespor
Suruç Gençlikspor
Şehitkamil Belediyespor
Elazığ Yolspor
Belen Belediyespor
44 Malatyaspor
İslahiyespor
Elbistan Belediyespor
Ovacık Belediye Ulaşspor

Group 3
Araklı Karaderespor
Iğdır Arasspor
Zağnosspor
Maçkaspor
Sarıkamış Belediyespor
Trabzon Kanuni FK
Arhavispor
Çayelispor
Serhat Ardahanspor
Ardeşenspor
Aşkale Belediyespor
Gümüşhane Telekomspor
Tercan 17 Şubatspor
Konursuspor

Group 4
Erbaaspor
Yeni Amasyaspor
Güzelordu Spor
Görelespor
Ladik Belediyespor
Osmancıkspor
Havza Belediyespor
Fatsa Belediyespor
Sinopspor
Kastamonu Özel İdare Köy Hizm.
1926 Bulancakspor
Termespor
Soğuksu Yenice Spor

Group 5
Sarayönü Belediyespor
Karaman Belediyespor
68 Yeni Aksarayspor
Mersin Büyükşehir Belediye MESKİ Spor
Akşehirspor
Ceyhanspor
Osmaniyespor Futbol Kulübü
Konya Ereğlispor
Aksaray 1989Spor
Anamur Belediyespor
Ceyhan Doğanspor
Erdemli Belediyespor
Seyhan Belediyespor

Group 6
Türk Metal Kırıkkalespor
Yozgatspor 1959 FK
Nevşehir Spor Gençlik
Yeni Altındağ Belediyespor
Kayseri Şekerspor
Kazan Belediyespor
Yeşil Kırşehirspor
Çankırı Belediye Gençlik Spor
Kayseri Yolspor
Hacılar Erciyes Gençlik ve Spor
Yıldızeli Birlikspor
Sivas Emniyetsporgücü
2005 Azatlıspor

Group 7
Afjet Afyonspor
Serik Belediyespor
Pursaklar Belediyespor
Eğirdirspor
Ankara DSİ Spor
Eskişehir Yunusemre Spor
Konyaaltı Belediyespor
İscehisarspor
Bucak Belediye Oğuzhanspor
Eskişehir Demirspor
Muratpaşa Belediyespor
Turanspor
Isparta Merkez Gençlikspor

Group 8
Halide Edip Adıvarspor
Bartınspor
Vefaspor
Paşabahçe
Kdz. Ereğli Belediyespor
Leventspor
Serdivanspor
Kocaalispor
Beyköy Belediyespor
Akçakocaspor
Dikilitaşspor
Kilimli Belediyespor
Yeniçağaspor
Karasuspor

Group 9
Kütahyaspor
Somaspor
Çiftay Yeşilova Gençlik Spor
Çiğli Belediyespor
Torbalıspor
Erdekspor
Gönen Belediyespor
Dumlupınar Üniversitesi Spor
Burhaniye Belediyespor
Kocaçeşme
Horozköy Gençlik İhtisasspor
Bilecik İl Özel İdaresi Spor
Kümaşspor

Group 10
Muğlaspor
Sökespor
Didim Belediyespor
Ödemişspor
Utaş Uşakspor
Kuşadasıspor
Denizli Sarayköyspor
Bornova 1881 Spor
Demirten Yeşilköyspor
Ortaca Belediyespor
Kale Belediyespor
İzmirspor
Uşak Belediyespor

Group 11
Sultangazispor
Çekmeköy Belediyesi Alemdağspor
Mudanyaspor
Beşyüzevlerspor
Elmasbahçelerspor
İFA Spor
Altınova Belediyespor
Büyükçekmece Belediyespor
Kestel Belediyespor
Yalovaspor
Karabiga Belediyesi Gençlik ve Spor
Çanakkalespor Futbol Kulübü
Gemlikspor

Group 12
Kocaelispor
Çengelköy Futbol Yatırımları AŞ
Tunaspor
Gebzespor
Ergene Velimeşespor
Körfez Belediyesi Hereke Yıldızspor
Edirnespor
Derince Belediye Demirspor
Çorluspor 1947
İstanbul Güngörenspor
Arnavutköy Belediyesi Gençlik ve Spor
Lüleburgazspor
Babaeskispor

== 2014–15 season ==
The teams promoted to TFF Third League:

- Cizre Spor
- Yomraspor
- Dersimspor
- Kozan Belediyespor
- Kastamonuspor 1966
- Zara Belediyespor
- Bodrum Belediye Bodrumspor
- Manisa Büyükşehir Belediyespor
- Sultanbeyli Belediyespor
- Düzcespor
- Tekirdağspor

=== Groups ===
Key to colors
Promoted	Play-out Winner	Play-out Loser	Relegated

Group 1
Cizre Spor
12 Bingölspor
Tatvan Gençlerbirliği Spor
Mardinspor
Başkalespor
Diyarbakır Yolspor
Yüksekova Belediyespor
Batman Gerçüş Bağlar Spor
Kurtalanspor
Diyarbakır 1968 Spor
Hasköy Yıldızspor
Patnos Gençlik Spor

Group 2
Yomraspor
Serhat Ardahanspor
Karaderespor
Görelespor
Beşikdüzüspor
Iğdır Aras Spor
Karsspor
Çayelispor
Ardeşenspor
Torulspor
Arhavispor
1926 Bulancakspor
13 Şubat Erzincan Gençlik Spor
Bayburt Belediyespor

Group 3
Dersimspor
Kilis Belediyespor
Şanlıurfa Karaköprü Belediyespor
44 Malatyaspor
Suruç Gençlik Spor
Elazığ Yolspor
Malatya Yeşilyurt Spor
Şehitkamil Belediyespor
Adıyamanspor
Elbistan Belediyespor
Pazarcıkspor
Sakıcı İnşaat Şenyurtspor
Adıyaman İl Özel İdaresi Spor

Group 4
Kozan Belediyespor
Mersin Büyükşehir Belediye MESKİ Spor
Ceyhanspor
Dörtyol Gençlerbirliği
Osmaniyespor Futbol Kulübü
Karaman Belediyespor
Toroslar Belediyespor
Akşehirspor
Sarayönü Belediyespor
Nevşehir Spor Gençlik
Akdeniz Belediyespor
Reyhanlı Belediyespor
Selçuklu Belediyespor
Adana Hadırlıgücü

Group 5
Kastamonuspor 1966
Yeni Amasyaspor
Güzelordu Spor
Termespor
Ladik Beldespor
Çarşambaspor
Bartınspor
Kaptan D.Ç. Soğuksu Yenice Spor
Sinopspor
Ulukavakspor
Fatsa Belediyespor
Ünyespor
Turhalspor
1930 Bafraspor

Group 6
Zara Belediyespor
Yeni Altındağ Belediyesi Spor
Yozgatspor Ticaret A.Ş.
MKE Kırıkkalespor
Sincan Belediyespor
Yeşil Kırşehir Spor
Kazan Belediyespor
Keçiören Bağlum Spor
Hacılar Erciyes Gençlik ve Spor
Aksaray Sanayi ve Gençlik Spor
Kayseri Yolspor
Sorgun Belediyespor
Cumhuriyet Üniversitesi Gençlik Spor Kulübü

Group 7
Bodrum Belediyesi Bodrumspor
Afjet Afyonspor
Muğlaspor
Uşak Sportif Gençlik Spor
Konyaaltı Belediyespor
Denizli Sarayköy Spor
İzmirspor
Eğirdirspor
Muratpaşa Belediyespor
Bucak Belediye Oğuzhanspor
Yeşilovaspor
Pamukkalespor
Isparta DSİ Spor
Selvioğluspor

Group 8
Manisa Büyükşehir Belediyespor
Atillaspor
Didim Belediyespor
Sındırgı Belediyespor
Somaspor
İzaks Gaziemir Spor
Erdekspor
Karabiga Belediyesi Gençlik ve Spor
İncirliova Belediyespor
Balıkesir Büyükşehir Belediyespor
Bozdoğan Belediyespor
Soma Sotesspor
Yeni Çanspor
Narlıdere Belediye Gençlik ve Spor

Group 9
Sultanbeyli Belediyespor
İfa Spor Kulübü
Leventspor
Gebzespor
Elmasbahçelerspor
Yenibosnaspor
Çayırovaspor
Altınova Belediyespor
Mudanyaspor
Kestel Belediyespor
Gebze Sultan Orhanspor
Modafen FK
Bozüyük Vitraspor
İnegöl Gençler Gücü Spor

Group 10
Düzcespor
Sultangazispor
Kütahyaspor
Çıksalınspor
Eskişehir Demirspor
Serdivanspor
Karasuspor
Dumlupınar Üniversitesi Spor
Dikilitaş Spor
Beyköy Belediyespor
Arifiye Kalaycı Spor
Eskişehir Sağlıkspor
Avcılar Belediye Gençlik ve Spor
Kıbrıscıkspor

Group 11
Tekirdağspor
Çengelköyspor
Arnavutköy Belediyesi Gençlik ve Spor
Kocaelispor
Büyükçekmece Belediyespor
Ergene Velimeşe Spor
Edirne Spor Gençlik
Karadeniz Ereğli Belediyespor
Kozlu Belediyespor
Babaeskispor
Erokspor
Çınarlıspor
Anafartalarspor

== 2013–14 season ==
The teams promoted to TFF Third League:

- Halide Edip Adıvarspor
- Erzin Belediyespor
- Çine Madranspor
- Tirespor 1922
- Çatalcaspor
- Niğde Belediyespor
- Bayburt Grup Özel İdarespor
- Etimesgut Belediyespor
- Zonguldak Kömürspor

=== Groups ===
Key to colors
Promoted	Play-out Winner	Play-out Loser	Relegated

Group 1
Bayburt Grup Özel İdare Gençlik Ve Spor
Yomraspor
Dersimspor
Beşikdüzüspor
Trabzon Faroz Gençlikspor
Çayelispor
Patnos Gençlikspor
Arhavispor
Kalkanderespor
Iğdır Gençlerbirliği
Karsspor
Yakutiyespor
Beşirlispor
Göle Belediyespor

Group 2
Mardinspor
Tatvan Gençlerbirliği
Cizre Basraspor
Diyarbakır Yolspor
Çapakçurspor
Erganispor
Yüksekova Belediyespor
Kurtalanspor
Batman Gerçüş Bağlarspor
Girmeli Belediyespor
Mus Ovasispor
Van İpekyoluspor
Diyarbakirspor

Group 3
Erzin Belediyespor
44 Malatyaspor
Reyhanlı Belediyespor
Şehitkamil Belediyespor
Karaköprü Belediyespor
Elazığ Yolspor
Elazığ İÖİ
Adıyaman İÖİ
Kilis Belediyespor
Malatya İÖİ
Şahinbey Belediyespor
Elbistan Belediyespor
Türkoğlu Belediyespor
Birecik Belediyespor
İskenderunspor 1967

Group 4
Zara Belediyespor
Sorgun Belediyespor
Çarşambaspor
İlkadım Belediyespor
Fatsa Belediyespor
Atakum Belediyespor
1926 Bulancakspor
Merzifonspor
Yıldızeli Birlikspor
Öz Espiye Belediyespor
Soyaspor Gençlik
Erzincanspor
Erbaa Güreş İhtisasspor
Kelkit Hürriyetspor

Group 5
Ceyhanspor
Niğde Belediyespor
Karaman Belediyespor
Kozan Belediyespor
MESKİ
Sarayönü Belediyespor
Kayseri Yolspor
Çatalhüyük Çumra Belediyespor
Toroslar Belediyespor
Osmaniyespor 2011
Talasgücü Belediyespor
Pozantıspor
Karapınar Belediyespor
Anamur Belediyespor

Group 6
Etimesgut Belediyespor
Sincan Belediyespor
Yeşil Kırşehirspor
Bartınspor
Keçiören Bağlumspor
Gölbaşı Belediyespor
Nevsehirspor Genclik
Tosya Belediyespor
Kirikkalespor
Aksaray Belediyespor
İskilip Belediyesi Gençlik Ve Spor
Çorumspor
Kastamonuspor
Safranboluspor

Group 7
Çine Madranspor
İzmirspor
Kumluca Belediyespor
Bodrum Belediyesi Bodrumspor
Çiğli Belediyespor
Didim Belediyespor
Muratpaşa Belediyespor
Muğlaspor
Yeni Bornovaspor
Denizli İÖİ
İncirliova Belediyespor
Sarayköyspor
Bucak Belediye Oğuzhanspor
Acıpayam Gençlikspor
Ispartaspor

Group 8
Tirespor 1922
Manisa Belediyespor
Somaspor
Kütahyaspor
Erdekspor
Gümüşorduspor
Salihli Belediyespor
Balıkesir Belediyespor
Usak Belediyespor
Foça Belediyespor
Edremit Belediyespor
Bozüyük Vitraspor
Kütahya Özel İdare Köy Hizmetlerispor
Kütahya Sera Şekerspor

Group 9
Arnavutköy Belediyesispor
Sultanbeyli Belediyespor
Eskişehir Demirspor
Kuştepespor
Yeniköyspor
Karasuspor
Serdivanspor
Beykoy Belediyespor
Adapazarıspor
Akçakocaspor
Eskişehir Sağlıkspor
Mudurnuspor
İscehisarspor
Emirdağspor

Group 10
Zonguldak Kömürspor
Çatalcaspor
Büyükçekmece Belediyespor
Sultangazispor
Kestel Belediyespor
Gebzespor
Körfez Belediyesi Hereke Yıldızspor
Çayırovaspor
İzmit Belediyespor
Kozlu Belediyespor
Kilimli Belediyespor
İnegöl Gençler Gücüspor
Kartepe Suadiyespor
Yenişehir Belediyespor

Group 11
Edirnespor Gençlik
İstanbul Halide Edip Adıvarspor
Yeni Bosnaspor
Tekirdağspor
Yeni Çanspor
Dikilitaşspor
Armutlu Belediyespor
Vefa S.K.
Bozcaadaspor
Babaeskispor
Keşanspor
Çerkezköyspor
Yalovaspor
Lüleburgazspor

== 2012–13 season ==
The teams promoted to TFF Third League:

- 1930 Bafraspor
- 68 Yeni Aksarayspor
- Ankara Adliyespor
- Ayvalıkgücü Belediyespor
- Balçova Belediyespor
- Çıksalınspor
- Düzyurtspor
- Kızılcabölükspor
- Payas Belediyespor 1975
- Tuzlaspor
- Yeni Diyarbakırspor

=== Groups ===
Group 1
Akçaabat Sebatspor
Araklıspor
Ardahanspor
Arhavispor
Bayburt Grup Özel İdare Gençlik ve Spor
Çayelispor
Düzyurtspor
Erzincanspor
Iğdır Üniversitesi Spor
Kalkanderespor
Karsspor
Kelkit Hürriyetspor
Patnos Gençlikspor
Sarıkamış Esnafspor
Yakutiyespor

Group 2
Batman Gerçüş Bağlar Spor
Bismil Belediyespor
Cizre Basra Spor
Dersimspor
Diyarbakır Kayapınar Belediyespor
Erganispor
Genç Murat Spor
Hakkari Zapspor
Kızıltepe Barış Spor
Kurtalanspor
Muş Ovasıspor
Tatvan Gençlerbirliği Spor
Van DSİ Spor
Yeni Diyarbakırspor

Group 3
1926 Bulancakspor
1930 Bafraspor
Atakum Belediyespor
Ayancıkspor
Çarşambaspor
Dikbıyık Belediyespor
Erbaa Güreş İhtisasspor
Fatsa Belediyespor
Öz Espiye Belediyespor
Sivas İl Özel İdaresi Spor
Soyaspor Gençlik
Trabzon İdmangücüspor
Yeni Amasyaspor
Yomraspor
Zara Belediyespor

Group 4
44 Malatyaspor
Adıyaman Belediyespor
Kahramanmaraş Beyoğluspor
Birecik Belediyespor
Elazığ İl Özel İdaresi Spor
Elbistan Belediyespor
Erzin Belediyespor
Kadirlispor
Kilis Belediyespor
Malatya İl Özel İdaresi Spor
Payas Belediyespor 1975
Siverek Belediyespor
Şahinbey Belediye Gençlik ve Spor
Şehit Kamil Belediyespor
Yurtbaşı Belediyespor

Group 5
68 Yeni Aksarayspor
Adana Gençlerbirliği
Akdeniz Belediyespor
Alpin Pozantı Gençlik ve Spor
Ceyhanspor
Çatalhöyük Çumra Belediyespor
Karaman Belediyespor
Kayseri Yolspor
Kocasinan Şimşekspor
Mersin Büyükşehir Belediye MESKİ Spor
Nevşehir Spor Gençlik
Niğde Belediyespor
Sarayönü Belediyespor
Selçuklu Belediyespor
Toroslar Belediyespor

Group 6
Akyurt Belediyespor
Ankara Adliyespor
Bartınspor
Eskipazar Belediyespor
Geredespor
İskilip Belediyesi Gençlik ve Spor
Kırıkkale Yahşihanspor
Kozlu Belediyespor
MKE Kırıkkalespor
Ostimspor
Sincan Belediyespor
Sorgun Belediyespor
Tosya Belediyespor
Zonguldak Kömürspor

Group 7
Bodrum Belediyesi Bodrumspor
Bucak Belediye Oğuzhanspor
Çiğli Belediyespor
Denizli Sarayköyspor
Gönenspor
Gümüşordu Spor
Isparta İl Özel İdare Spor
Kepez Belediyespor
Kızılcabölükspor
Konakspor
Kumluca Belediyespor
Manavgat Belediyespor
Muğlaspor
Muratpaşa Belediyespor
Yeşilova

Group 8
Afyonkarahisarspor
Balçova Belediyespor
Çine Madranspor
Didim Belediyespor
Emirdağspor
İscehisarspor
İzmirspor
Manisa Belediyespor
Manisa İl Özel İdaresi Spor
Salihli Belediyespor
Sökespor
Uşak İl Özel İdaresi Spor
Uşak Sportif Gençlik Spor
Tire 1922 Spor

Group 9
Altınova Belediyespor
Armutlu Belediyespor
Ayvalıkgücü Belediyespor
Balıkesir Belediyespor
Beykozspor 1908
Bigaspor
Bozcaadaspor
Bursa Merinosspor
Büyükçekmece Belediyespor
Gönen Belediyespor
Küçükçekmecespor
Kestel Belediyespor
Mudanyaspor
Vefaspor
Yenişehir Belediyespor

Group 10
Adapazarıspor
Akçakocaspor
AS Akyazıspor
Beyköy Belediyespor
Çatalcaspor
Çıksalınspor
Dikilitaşspor
Dumlupınar Üniversitesi Spor
Eskişehir Demirspor
Eskişehir Sağlıkspor
İstanbulspor
Kocaalispor
Kütahyaspor
Kütahya Sera Şekerspor

Group 11
Babaeskispor
Bağcılarspor
Çerkezköyspor
Edirne Spor Gençlik
İncirlispor
İzmit Çenesuyu Plajspor
Kartepe Suadiyespor
Kırklareli Sanayispor
Körfez Belediyesi Hereke Yıldızspor
Lüleburgazspor
Sultanbeyli Belediyespor
Sultangazispor
Tekirdağspor
Tuzlaspor

== 2011–12 season ==
The teams promoted to TFF Third League:

- Bergama Belediyespor
- Silivrispor
- Derince Belediyespor
- Fatih Karagümrük
- Isparta Emrespor
- Kahramanmaraş BBSK
- Kayseri Şekerspor
- Çorum Bld.
- Erzincan Refahiyespor

=== Groups ===
Group 1
3 Mart Beldespor
Ardeşenspor
Arhavispor
Bayazıtspor
Bayburt Belediyespor
Bingöl İl Özel İdaresispor
Göle Belediyespor
Kağızmanspor
Kalkanderespor
Kelkit Hürriyetspor
Refahiyespor

Group 2
Siirt Gençlerbirliğispor
Yeni Diyarbakırspor
Dersimspor
Muratspor
Gercüş Bağlarspor
Yeni Şırnakspor
Bağlar Belediyespor
Hakkari Zapspor
Kızıltepespor
72 Batmanspor
Van DSİspor
Bitlis Özgüzelderespor

Group 3
1930 Bafraspor
Bulancak Belediyespor
Dikbıyık Belediyespor
Trabzon Düzyurtspor
Erbaa Güreş İhtisasspor
Espiye Belediyespor
Fatsa Belediyespor
İlkadım Belediyespor
Trabzon İdmanocağı
Ünye Belediyespor
Yeni Amasyaspor
Yomraspor

Group 4
44 Malatyaspor
Adıyaman Belediyespor
Kadirlispor
Kahramanmaraş Belediyespor
Kilis Belediyespor
Malatyaspor
Orduzuspor
Siverek Belediyespor
Şanlıurfa İl Özel İdarespor
Şehitkamil Belediyespor

Group 5
70 Karaman Gençlikspor
Adana Gençlerbirliği
Adana Tekspor
Bozyazı Belediyespor
Ceyhanspor
Erdemli Belediyespor
Erzin Belediyespor
İskenderun Asaşspor
Kayseri Şekerspor
Niğde Belediyespor
Talasgücü Belediyespor
Toroslar Belediyespor

Group 6
68 Yeni Aksarayspor
Akyurt Belediyespor
Çorum Belediyespor
İl Özel İdaresispor
Kazan Belediyespor
Kırşehirspor
Nevşehir Gençlikspor
Sincan Belediyespor
Sorgun Belediyespor
Şirin Kırşehirspor
Türk Metal Gençlikspor
Zara Belediyespor

Group 7
Burdur Şekerspor
Beyşehir Belediyespor
Demre Belediyespor
Emirdağspor
Emrespor
Ispartaspor
Isparta İl Özel İdarespor
İhsaniye Belediyespor
Kumluca Belediyespor
Manavgat Belediyespor
Sarayönü Belediyespor
Selçuklu Belediyespor

Group 8
Altınova Belediyespor
Armutlu Belediyespor
Bursa Merinosspor
Eskişehir Demirspor
Gaybiefendispor
İznikspor
Kestel Belediyespor
Kütahyaspor
Sağlıkspor
Simav Gençyurduspor
Yalovaspor
Zaferspor

Group 9
Bergama Belediyespor
Bozdoğan Belediyespor
Çine Madranspor
Didim Belediyespor
İzmirspor
Kaklık Belediyespor
Konakspor
Muğlaspor
Torbalıspor
Turgutreis Belediyespor
Uşak Belediyespor
Uşak İl Özel İdaresispor

Group 10
Ayvalıkgücü Belediyespor
Balıkesir Belediyespor
Bozcaadaspor
Çiğli Belediyespor
Küçükköy Belediyespor
Karabiga İçdaşspor
Kulaspor
Manisa Belediyespor
Ödemiş Belediyespor
Salihli Belediyespor
Talasgücü Belediyespor
Yeni Bornovaspor

Group 11
Avcılar Belediyespor
Babaeskispor
Beykoz 1908
Büyükçekmecespor
Darıca Kale Bayramoğluspor
Derince Belediyespor
Edirnespor
Feriköy SK
İstanbulspor
Keşanspor
Kocaeli Kağıtspor
İzmit Çenesuyu Plajyoluspor

Group 12
Adapazarıspor
AS Akyazıspor
Beşyüzevlerspor
Çerkezköyspor
Çorlu Gençlerbirliğispor
Fatih Karagümrük
Garajlar Taçspor
Silivrispor
Sultanbeyli Belediyespor
Vitraspor
Yeniköyspor

Group 13
Bartınspor
Belediye Safranboluspor
Beyköy Belediyespor
Düzcespor
Geredespor
İstanbul Beylikdüzüspor
Kozluspor
Sultangazispor
Tunaspor
Tosya Belediyespor
Zeytinburnuspor
Zonguldak Kömürspor

== 2010–11 season ==
The teams promoted to TFF Third League:

- Erzurum BBSK
- Erganispor
- Beşikdüzüspor
- Çarşambaspor
- Elazığ Belediyespor
- Manavgat Evrensekispor
- Kilimli Belediyespor
- Aydınspor 1923
- Yeni Sandıklı Bld.
- Maltepespor
- Ümraniyespor
- Küçükçekmece SK

=== Groups ===
Group 1
Erzurum BBSK
Dersimspor
Karaçomakspor
Erzincanspor
Kağızmanspor
Bayazıtspor
Bayburt Belediyespor
Bingöl İl Özel İdare
Muş Şekerspor
Ardahan Belediye 23 Şubat

Group 2
Erganispor
Bitlis Özgüldere
Adıyaman Belediyespor
Siirt Gençlerbirliği
Diyarbakır İl Özel İdare Ay Spor
Yüksekova Cilospor
Başkalespor
Şırnak Şenobaspor
Kızıltepe Gençlerbirliği
Birecik Belediyespor

Group 3
Beşikdüzüspor
Yomraspor
Fatsa Belediyespor
Bulancak Belediye
Sürmenespor
Ünye Belediyespor
Kalkanderespor
Espiyespor
İyiderespor
Arhavispor
Çukurçayır Beldespor
Bulancakspor

Group 4
Çarşambaspor
1930 Bafraspor
Erbaaspor
Sivas İl Özel İdare
İlkadım Belediyespor
Çorum Belediyespor
Boyabat Çeltikspor
Sorgun Belediyespor
Amasya Üniversitesi
Tekkeköy Belediye
Çankırı İl Özel İdare

Group 5
Elazığ Belediyespor
K.Maraş Belediye
Kayseri Şekerspor
Adana Gençlerbirliği
Kayseri Yolspor
Elbistan Belediyespor
Erzin Belediyespor
G.Antep İl Özel İdare
Osmaniye Önderspor
Kilis Belediyespor
Malatya İl Özel İdare
Malatya Demirspor

Group 6
Manavgat Evrensekispor
Toroslar Belediyespor
68 Yeni Aksarayspor
Anamur Belediyespor
Akdeniz Belediyespor
Sarayönü Belediyespor
Niğde Belediyespor
Demre Belediyespor
Karaman Gençlerbirliği
Nevşehir Narspor
Çatalhüyük Çumra Bld
Konya Gençlerbirliği

Group 7
Kilimli Belediyespor
Eskişehir Demirspor
Sincan Belediyespor
Zonguldakspor
Bartınspor
Akyurt Belediyespor
Pursaklar Belediyespor
Ankara Adliyespor
Geredespor
Çelik-İş Ormanspor
Yahşihanspor
Kırşehir Fatihspor

Group 8
Aydınspor 1923
Çiğli Belediyespor
Denizli Konakspor
İzmirspor
Foça Belediyespor
Çine Madranspor
Muğlaspor
Turgutreis Belediyespor
Yeni Milasspor
Bereketlispor
Kuşadasıspor
Denizli Yeşilköyspor
Bucak Bld.Oğuzhanspor

Group 9
Yeni Sandıklı Bld.
Uşak Belediyespor
Kütahyaspor
Uşak İl Özel İdare
Ödemiş Belediyespor
Kulaspor
Salihli Belediyespor
Manisa Donatımspor
Emirdağspor
Gaybiefendispor
Kemalpaşa Bld.Ulucak
Savspor
Kütahya Şekerspor

Group 10
Maltepespor
Bursa Merinosspor
Kestel Belediyespor
Ayvalıkgücü Belediyespor
Fatih Karagümrük
Edremit Belediyespor
Bursa Zaferspor
Feriköy
İstanbul Kartal Bld.
Bursa Yenişehir Bld.
Osmanelispor
Bigaspor

Group 11
Ümraniyespor
Düzcespor
Adapazarı Spor
Beyköy Belediye
Hendek Gençlik
Serdivanspor
Kocaeli Bş.B.Kağıtspor
Derince Bld.
İzmit Çenesuyu Plajyolu
Sultanbeyli Bld.
Körfez Bld.Hereke Yıldız
Kaynaşlı Bld.
Küçükköy
Rami

Group 12
Küçükçekmece
Altınova Bld.
Keşanspor
Çerkezköyspor
Beylikdüzü
Yeniköy
Alibeyköy
Tekirdağspor
Çiftlikköy Belediye
Ayşekadın G.Birliği
Velimeşe Bld.
Kırklareli Sanayi

== See also ==
- Süper Lig
- TFF First League
- TFF Second League
- TFF Third League
- Amatör Futbol Ligleri
- Turkish Cup (since 1962–63)
