= Ayvalıkgücü Belediyespor =

Turkish football club

- Full name: Ayvalıkgücü Belediyespor
- Founded: 1966
- Ground: Hüsnü Uğural Stadium, Ayvalık / Balıkesir
- Capacity: 1,050
- Chairman: Mehmet Babayiğit
- Manager: Mehmet Yıkılmazdağ
- League: TFF Third League
- 2023–24: TFF Third League 3rd of 15, Group I

Ayvalıkgücü Belediyespor is a football club located in Balıkesir, Turkey. The team competes in the TFF Third League.

== League participations ==
- TFF Third League: 2013–present
- Turkish Regional Amateur League: 2010–2013

== Stadium ==
Currently the team plays at the 1,050 capacity Hüsnü Uğural Stadium.
