= Kızılcabölükspor =

Turkish football club

- Full name: Kızılcabölük Spor Kulübü
- Founded: 1982
- Ground: Kızılcabölük Semt Stadium, Denizli
- Capacity: 1,100
- Chairman: Osman Duran
- Manager: Ahmet Kafes
- League: Turkish Regional Amateur League
- 2021–22: TFF 3. Lig, Group 2, 16th (relegated)
- Website: http://www.kizilcabolukspor.org/
| Home colours | Away colours |

Kızılcabölükspor is a football club located in Denizli, Turkey. The club was promoted to the TFF Third League after 2012–13 season.

== League participations ==
- TFF Third League: 2013–2022
- Turkish Regional Amateur League: 2012–2013

== Stadium ==
Currently the team plays at Kızılcabölük Semt Stadium.
