= İzmir Çoruhlu FK =

Turkish football club

- Full name: Bergama Belediye Spor Kulübü
- Nickname: Pergamon
- Founded: 1970
- Ground: 14 Eylül Stadyumu; Bergama, İzmir
- Capacity: 2,000
- Chairman: Hasan Canoğlu
- Manager: Behram Üstün
- League: TFF 3. Lig
- 2021–22: TFF 3. Lig, Group 1, 10th
Home colours	Away colours

İzmir Çoruhlu FK is a football club located in Bergama, Turkey.

== Previous names ==
- Bergamaspor (1970–1998)
- Bergama Belediyespor (1998–2022)
- Bergama FK (2022–2024)
- İzmir Çoruhlu FK (2024-

== League participations ==
- TFF Second League: 1995–1996
- TFF Third League: 1984–1995, 1996–2003, 2012–present
- Turkish Regional Amateur League: 2011–2012

== Stadium ==
Currently the team plays at the 2,000-seat capacity 14 Eylül Stadyumu.
