= Beylerbeyi S.K. =

- Full name: Beylerbeyi Spor Kulübü
- Founded: 1911
- Ground: Beylerbeyi 75. Yıl, Istanbul
- Capacity: 5,500
- Chairman: Mustafa Yazıcı
- Manager: Orhan Serit
Home colours	Away colours

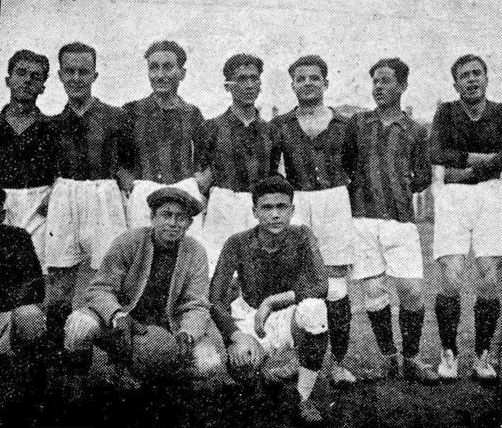
The Beylerbeyi football team, featured in the Monthly Magazine, March, 1927.

Beylerbeyi S.K. is a Turkish football club in Istanbul. The team plays at the 6,500 capacity Beylerbeyi 75. Yıl Stadium, sharing the ground with Anadolu Üsküdar. Beylerbeyi S.K. was the recruitment resource of Galatasaray Sports Club between 2003 and 2009.

== League participations ==
- TFF First League: 1963–69, 1981–83, 1996–98
- TFF Second League: 1969–72, 1984–96, 1998–2001, 2008–09
- TFF Third League: 2001–08, 2009–
- Turkish Regional Amateur League: 1972–81, 1983–84

== Current squad ==
Note: Flags indicate national team as defined under FIFA eligibility rules; some limited exceptions apply. Players may hold more than one non-FIFA nationality.

No.	Pos.	Nation	Player
53	GK	TUR	Mehmet Aşlamacı
48	DF	TUR	Onur Uğlu
33	DF	TUR	Mehmet Ballı
15	DF	TUR	Fatih Sercan Ekinci
24	DF	TUR	Kaan Dorak
44	DF	TUR	Umut Yavaş (C)
54	DF	TUR	Kubat Ceyhun Sarı
66	MF	TUR	Çetin Turan
88	MF	TUR	Çağdaş Topal

No.	Pos.	Nation	Player
18	MF	TUR	Gökhan Günaydın
22	MF	TUR	İsmail Erdoğan (C)
98	MF	TUR	Ömer Halis Güven
19	MF	TUR	Ünal Avcı
5	MF	TUR	Sertaç Ergen
23	MF	TUR	Eren Ahmet Balkan
80	MF	TUR	Sinan Çınar
9	FW	TUR	Çağrı Yasan
21	FW	TUR	Osman Mertoğlu (C)
70	FW	TUR	Hayri Mert Yomralıoğlu
27	FW	TUR	Erhan Göç
14	FW	TUR	Okan Demir

== See also ==
- List of Turkish Sports Clubs by Foundation Dates
