= Gümüşhanespor =

Turkish sports club

- Full name: Gümüşhane Spor Kulübü
- Founded: 1995
- Ground: Gümüşhane Yenişehir Stadium, Gümüşhane
- Capacity: 4,000
- Chairman: Vahit Olgun
- Manager: Bülent Demirkanlı
- League: TFF 3. Lig
- 2021–22: TFF 3. Lig, Group 3, 13th
- Website: http://www.gumushanespor.com.tr/
Home colours	Away colours	Third colours

Gümüşhanespor is a Turkish sports club based in Gümüşhane. The football team currently plays in the TFF Third League.
