= Payasspor =

- Full name: Payas Spor Kulübü
- Founded: 1975
- Ground: Payas İlçe Stadı, Payas
- Capacity: 3,000
- Chairman: Mehmet Ay
- Manager: Ferhat Timoçin
- 2018–19: TFF Third League, Group 3, 8th
Home colours	Away colours

Payasspor, formerly Payas Belediyespor 1975, is a football club located in Payas near Hatay, southern Turkey.

== League participations ==
- TFF Third League: 2013–present
- Turkish Regional Amateur League: 2011–2013

== League performances ==
Season	League	Pos	Pld	W	D	L	PF	PA	Pts
2011–12	Turkish Regional Amateur League – 5th Group	6	22	7	8	7	21	27	29
2012–13	Turkish Regional Amateur League – 4th Group	1	28	21	7	0	59	7	70
2013–14	TFF Third League – 1st Group	12	34	12	9	13	47	37	45
2014–15	TFF Third League – 2nd Group	13	34	11	10	13	40	41	43
2015–16	TFF Third League – 2nd Group	14	36	11	13	12	38	39	46
2016–17	TFF Third League	TBD	0	0	0	0	0	0	0

Promotion
Relegation

Source: TFF: Payas Belediyespor 1975

== Stadium ==
Currently the team plays at the 5000 capacity Payas Stadium

== Other departments ==
Payas Belediyespor 1975 has also a men's volleyball team competing in the second-level of Turkish Men's Volleyball League.
