= Çankaya F.K. =

Turkish football club

Çankaya
- Full name: Çankaya Futbol Kulübü
- Founded: 1993
- Ground: Ostim Stadium, Ankara
- Capacity: 4,271
- Chairman: Maruf Güneş
- Manager: İsmail Batur
- Website: http://www.cankayafk.com/
| Home colours | Away colours |

Çankaya Futbol Kulübü, formerly Ankara Adliyespor, is a football club located in Ankara, Turkey. The team currently competes in the TFF Third League.

The club was promoted to the TFF Third League after 2012–13 season.

== League participations ==
- TFF Third League: 2013–
- Amateur League: 1993–2013

== Stadium ==
Currently the team plays at the 4,200 capacity Ankara Ostim Stadyumu.
