= Niğde Anadolu FK =

Turkish football club

- Full name: Niğde Anadolu Futbol Kulübü
- Founded: 2018
- Ground: Niğde 5 Şubat Stadium, Niğde
- Capacity: 5,000
- Chairman: Ural Aküzüm
- Manager: Ceyhun Müderrisoğlu
- League: TFF 3. Lig
- 2021–22: TFF 2. Lig, Red, 19th (relegated)
Home colours	Away colours

Niğde Anadolu Futbol Kulübü is a Turkish professional football club located in Niğde. The team currently competes in TFF Third League. The club was previously named Niğde Belediyespor and served as the developmental team for Galatasaray SK

== League participations ==
- TFF Second League: 2016-present
- TFF Third League: 2014–2016
- Turkish Regional Amateur League: 2010–2014

== Stadium ==
The home ground of Niğde Anadolu FK is the Niğde 5 Şubat Stadium in Niğde, which has a capacity of 5,000.
