= Gaziosmanpaşaspor =

- Full name: Gaziosmanpaşa Spor Kulübü
- Founded: 1963
- Ground: Gaziosmanpaşa Stadium, Istanbul
- Capacity: 2,850
- Chairman: Mehmet Öztürk
- Manager: Hasan Saka
Home colours	Away colours

Gaziosmanpaşa S.K., or simply GOP, is a Turkish sports club from the Gaziosmanpaşa district of Istanbul.

== League participations ==
- TFF Second League: 1990–98, 1999–03, 2007–09, 2011–14
- TFF Third League: 1998–99, 2003–07, 2009–11, 2014-16
- Turkish Regional Amateur League: 1965–90, 2016-
