= Silivrispor =

Turkish sports club

- Full name: Silivrispor
- Nickname: kirmizi-mavi
- Founded: 1957
- Ground: Silivri Stadium, Silivri, Istanbul
- Capacity: 3,000
- President: Nuri Çolakoğlu
- Manager: Sertan Güriz
- League: TFF Third League
- 2019–20: TFF Third League, Group 1, 9th
Home colours	Away colours

Silivrispor is a Turkish sports club from Silivri, in the north-west of Turkey.

The clubs plays in red and blue kits, and have done so since their formation in 1957.

In 2013–2014 season, Silivrispor participate in TFF Third League.

== Stadium ==
Currently the team plays at the 3,000 capacity Silivri Stadium.

== League participations ==
- TFF First League: 1986–87
- TFF Second League: 2017–18
- TFF Third League: 1984–86, 1987–94, 2012–17, 2018–
- Turkish Regional Amateur League: 2011–12
- Turkish Amateur Football Leagues: 1957–84, 1994–2011
