= Manavgatspor =

Turkish football club

- Full name: Manavgatspor
- Founded: 2009
- Ground: Evrenseki Stadı, Manavgat / Antalya
- Capacity: 300
- Chairman: Mahmut Şeker
- League: Turkish Regional Amateur League
- 2017–18: TBD

Manavgatspor is a football club located in Antalya, Turkey. The team competes in the Turkish Regional Amateur League.

== Previous names ==
- Manavgat Evrensekispor (2009–2014)
- Manavgatspor (2014–2019)

== Stadium ==
Currently the team plays at Evrenseki Stadı.
