= Istanbul Maltepespor =

Turkish football club

Maltepespor
- Full name: Istanbul Maltepespor
- Founded: 1923
- Ground: Hasan Polat Stadium, Maltepe, Istanbul
- Capacity: 5,000
- Chairman: Ömer Lefzan
- Manager: Hasan Ali CESUR
- League: Turkish Regional Amateur League
- Website: https://maltepespor.org.tr/
Home colours	Away colours

İstanbul Maltepespor, often known as just Maltepespor, is a Turkish football club from the Istanbul district of Maltepe, Istanbul. They compete in the Turkish Regional Amateur League, the fifth level of the Turkish football league system.
