= Super Amateur Leagues =

- Organising body: Turkish Football Federation (TFF)
- Country: Turkey
- Confederation: UEFA
- Level on pyramid: 6
- Promotion to: Professional Transition League
- Relegation to: Amateur First Division
- Website: Turkish Amateur Football Leagues
- Current: 2025–26 Super Amateur Leagues

The Super Amateur Leagues (Turkish: Süper Amatör Ligleri) comprises a number of football leagues that make up the sixth tier of the Turkish football league system. Each province has its own league.

== See also ==
- Süper Lig
- TFF First League
- TFF Second League
- TFF Third League
- Turkish Regional Amateur League
- Turkish Cup (since 1962–63)
