= Sanjak of Alexandretta =

Polity on the Turkish-French Syrian border (1921–1938)

Coordinates: 36.4140°N 36.2526°E

Map showing the states of the French Occupation (Mandate) from 1921 to 1922

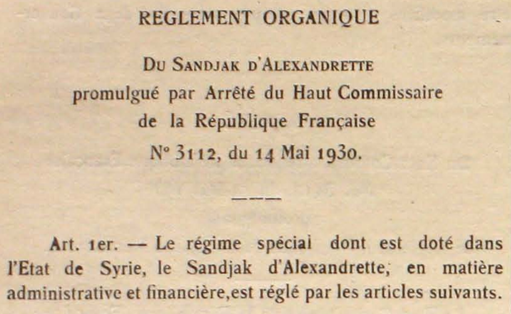
Reglement Organique of the Sandjak of Alexandretta, within the State of Syria, 14 May 1930

The Sanjak of Alexandretta (Arabic: لواء الإسكندرونة, romanized: Liwa' Al-Iskandarūna; Turkish: İskenderun Sancağı; French: Sandjak d'Alexandrette) was a sanjak of the Mandate of Syria composed of two qadaas of the former Aleppo Vilayet (Alexandretta and Antioch, now İskenderun and Antakya). It became autonomous under Article 7 of the 1921 Treaty of Ankara: "A special administrative regime shall be established for the district of Alexandretta. The Turkish inhabitants of this district shall enjoy facility for their cultural development. The Turkish language shall have official recognition".

In 1923, Alexandretta was attached to the State of Aleppo, and in 1925, it was attached to the combined State of Syria, with a sort of federal administrative status termed régime spécial.

The 1936 elections in the sanjak returned two MPs favoring the independence of Syria from France, and this prompted communal riots as well as passionate articles in the Turkish and Syrian press. The sanjak was given autonomy in November 1937 in an arrangement brokered by the League. Under its new statute, the sanjak became 'distinct but not separated' from the French Mandate of Syria on the diplomatic level, linked to both France and Turkey for defence matters.

== Population ==
The province had an ethnic plurality of Turks and Arabs, also including various minorities.

Population of Hatay State in 1936 according to the French census
Ethnic group	Inhabitants	%
Alawites	61,600	28%
Sunni Arabs	22,000	10%
Turks	85,800	39%
Armenians	24,200	11%
Melkites, Greeks and other Christians	17,600	8%
Circassians, Jews, Kurds	8,800	4%
Total	220,000	100%

Despite the plurality, Turks were overrepresented in the assembly of the province, constituting more than half of it. The minorities took their oaths in Turkish when they were appointed as a deputy.

== 1938 voter registration and elections ==
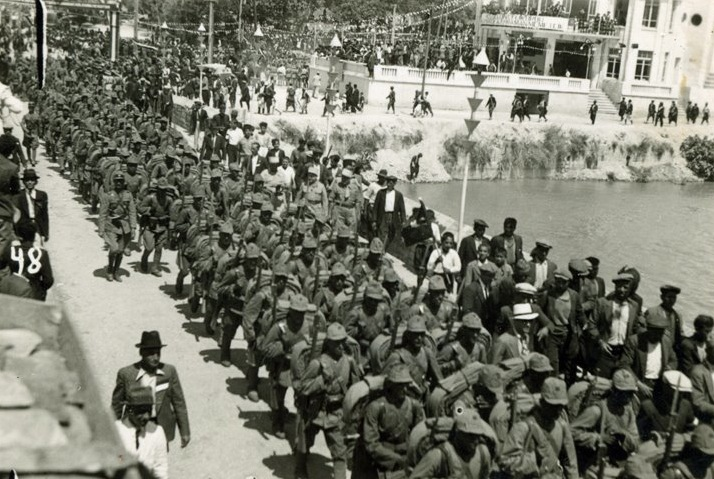
Turkish forces under Colonel Şükrü Kanatlı entering İskenderun on July 5, 1938.

The allocation of seats in the sanjak assembly was based on the 1938 census held by the French authorities under international supervision: out of 40 seats, 22 were given to the Turks, nine for Alawites, five for Armenians, two for Sunni Arabs, and two for Antiochian Greeks. Based on 29 May 1937 agreement and the 3 July 1938 signings France and Turkey will co-defence Hatay with 2500 troops for each. According to this agreement, the Turkish military has sent intervention forces from Payas, Dörtyol and Hassa. On July 5, Turkish forces entered İskenderun.

According to the official registration numbers by July 22, 1938, 57,008 voters in the Sanjak were registered, belonging to the following ethnic groups.

- Turks: 35,847
- Alawites (Arabs): 11,319
- Armenians: 5,504
- Greek Orthodox (Arabs and Greeks): 2,098
- Arabs (Sunni Muslim): 1,845
- Others: 359

40 seats of the sanjak assembly per qadaa were distributed as follows:

- Antakya: 14 Turks, 7 Alawites, 2 Armenians, 2 Sunni Arabs, 1 Greek Orthodox
- İskenderun: 3 Turks, 2 Alawites, 1 Armenian, 1 Greek Orthodox
- Kırıkhan: 5 Turks, 2 Armenians
- Total: 22 Turks, 9 Alawites, 5 Armenians, 2 Sunni Arabs, 2 Greek Orthodox

Despite the voter registration, no elections were held and an approved by Hatay assembly was commissioned by Turkish and French authorities. Tayfur Sökmen who was appointed by Atatürk to lead the transition arrived in Antakya from Dörtyol on August 25, 1938.

== Hatay State ==
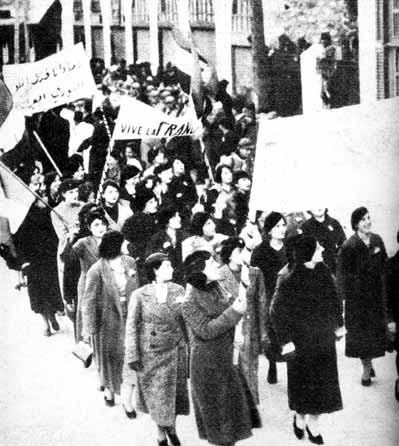
Protests in Damascus by women demonstrators against Turkey's annexation of the Sanjak of Alexandretta in 1939. One of the signs reads: "Our blood is sacrificed for the Syrian Arab Sanjak."

On September 2, 1938, the assembly proclaimed the Sanjak of Alexandretta as the Hatay State. The State lasted for one year under joint French and Turkish military supervision. The name Hatay itself was proposed by Atatürk and the government was under Turkish control. The president Tayfur Sökmen was a member of the Turkish parliament elected in 1935 (representing Antalya Province) and the prime minister Dr. Abdurrahman Melek, was also elected to the Turkish parliament (representing Gaziantep Province) in 1939 while still holding the prime-ministerial post. On 29 June 1939, following a referendum, the Hatay legislature voted to disestablish the Hatay State and join Turkey. The Hatay State became the Hatay Province of Turkey in 1939.
