= Payas Belediyespor 2011 (men's volleyball) =

Payas Belediyespor 1975
- Leagues: Turkish Men's Volleyball League
- Arena: Payas Sport Hall
- Location: Payas/Hatay, Turkey
- Team colors: Blue and White
- President: (Turkey) Mehmet Ay

Payas Belediyespor 2011 Men Volleyball is the men volleyball section of Payas Belediyespor, a major sports club in Hatay, Turkey.

== League Performances ==
| Season | League | Pos | Pld | W | L | SW | SL | P |
|---|---|---|---|---|---|---|---|---|
| 2011–12 | Turkish Men's Regional Volleyball League – Group R | 1 | 6 | 6 | 0 | 18 | 4 | 17 |
| 2012–13 | Turkish Men's Third Volleyball League – Group C | 1 | 9 | 8 | 1 | 26 | 4 | 25 |
| | Turkish Men's Third Volleyball League – Final 1. Group | 3 | 3 | 2 | 1 | 8 | 5 | 6 |
| 2013–14 | Turkish Men's Second Volleyball League – Group B | 5 | 22 | 15 | 7 | 52 | 28 | 45 |
| 2014–15 | Turkish Men's Second Volleyball League – Group B | 7 | 22 | 12 | 10 | 41 | 39 | 33 |
| 2015–16 | Turkish Men's Second Volleyball League – Group B | 4 | 24 | 19 | 5 | 62 | 26 | 55 |
| | Turkish Men's Second Volleyball League – Semifinals 2. Group | 3 | 3 | 1 | 2 | 4 | 6 | 3 |
| 2016–17 | Turkish Men's First Volleyball League – Group B | 10 | 26 | 9 | 17 | 38 | 58 | 29 |
| 2017–18 | | | | | | | | |
