= Hatay dispute =

Syrian-Turkish border dispute (1939–2024)

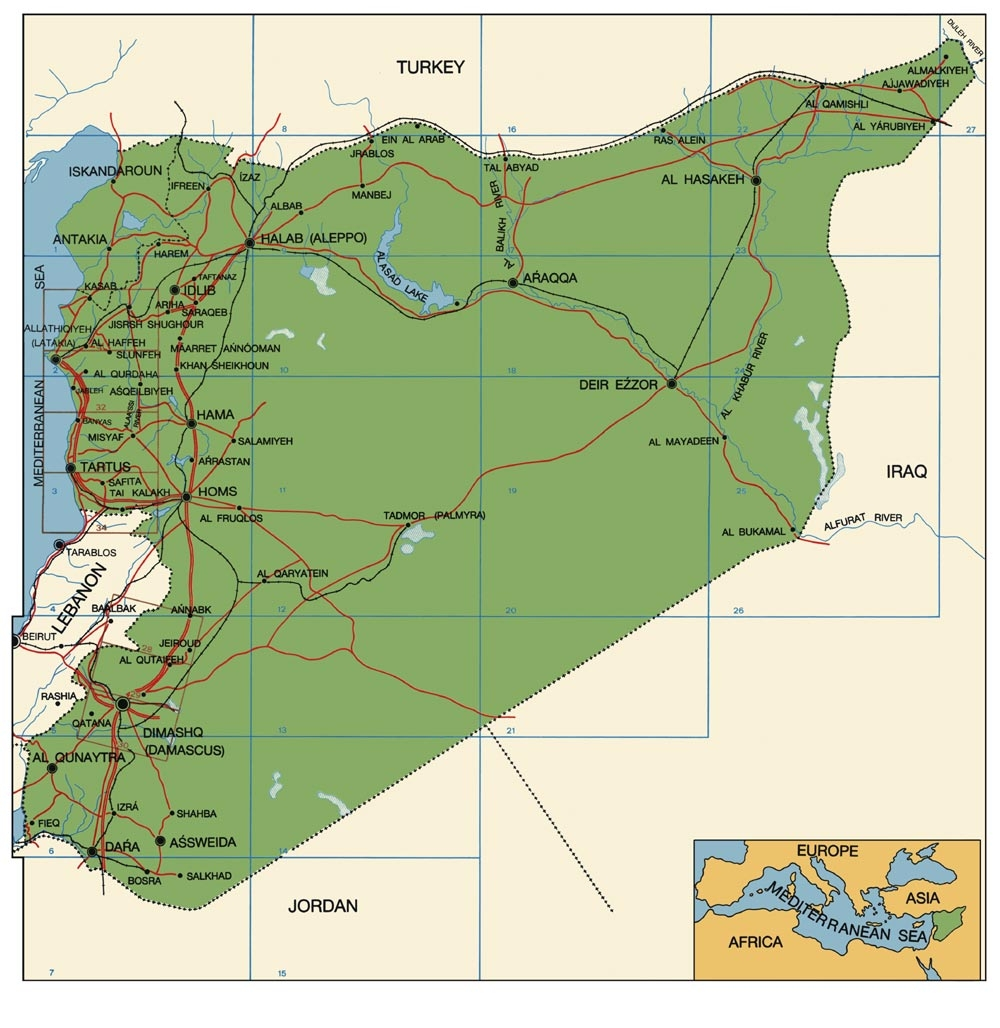
Map of Syria including Hatay

The Hatay dispute emerged when Turkey annexed Hatay Province from the newly independent Syria in 1939. The Hatay dispute remained a controversial problem between Syria and Turkey from time to time between 1939 and 2024. (Note: Implied by the logos of the Syrian Ministry of Information, and the General Security Service. The General Federation of Trade Unions also a new logo with a map excluding the Hatay Province in 2025.)

In 1939, while Syria was still a French mandate the French allowed a plebiscite regarding the Sanjak of Alexandretta joining to Turkey as part of a treaty of friendship in World War II. In order to facilitate this, a faulty election was done in which ethnic Turks who were originally from the Sanjak but lived in Adana and other areas near the border in Turkey came to vote in the elections, shifting the election in favor of secession. Through this, the Hatay Province of Turkey was formed. The move by the French was very controversial in Syria, and only five years later Syria became independent. Despite the Turkish annexation of the Sanjak of Alexandretta, the Syrian government has refused to recognize Turkish sovereignty over the region since Independence, except for a short period in 1949.

The slogan "Hatay is Turkish and will remain Turkish" is used by Turkish nationalists. On the other side, the annexation of the province referred to as the 'Usurped Province' and its incorporation is commemorated on November 29 of each year in Ba'athist Syria, but revised maps after the fall of the Assad regime show Hatay Province as part of Turkey, signaling an abandonment of Syria's claim to the territory.

== History ==
=== Franco–Turkish dispute ===
Late 20th–early 21st century language distribution in Hatay: Turkish Arabic Arabic-speakers are shown by religious affiliation: Alawite (circle), Christian (triangle), Sunni (square), Bedouin Sunni (rectangle), Jewish (rhombus).

During the collapse of the Ottoman Empire, after the Armistice of Mudros, the Sanjak of Alexandretta (modern day Hatay) was occupied by France. Thus, the Turkish National Movement formed a front in Hatay. On October 20, 1921, according to Article 7 of the Treaty of Ankara, Hatay would remain within the borders of Syria; although with the Turkish language and Turkish lira being official.

In 1936, out of the 220,000 people in Hatay, 46% were Arabs, 39% were Turks, 11% were Armenians, and the remaining 4% was made up of Circassians, Jews, and Kurds. In the Treaty of Lausanne, Hatay was also included as a part of Syria. Also in the Treaty of Lausanne the Hatay dispute was not specifically mentioned, when France withdrew from the Sanjak of Alexandretta in 1936 and gave it to Syria, Turkey refused to recognize Hatay as Syrian. When negotiations with France in Geneva did not yield results, they gave an official note to France on October 9, 1936, asking for the independence of the Sanjak of Alexandretta from Syria.

In his opening speech to the Grand National Assembly of Turkey on November 1, 1936, Turkish president Mustafa Kemal Atatürk stated that "a major issue that keeps our nation busy day and night is the fate of İskenderun, Antakya, and their surroundings, of which the Turk is the true owner. We are serious about it and we definitely have to end it. This is the only and big issue between us and France, whom we always emphasise the importance of friendship with. Those who know the truth of this affair, and those who love the truth, understand and see the violence and sincerity of our affair." Atatürk had also told the French Ambassador to Turkey that "Hatay is my personal cause. You must know that, it won't be a joke." Atatürk also claimed that Hatay had been Turkish for 4,000 years, due to the false Sun Language Theory. Turkish authorities referred to Alawites as "Hittite Turks" (Eti Türkleri) in order to conceal their Arab origins. In 1938, the Turkish army entered İskenderun and expelled most Arabs and Armenians.

=== Turkish annexation ===
Concerned that Atatürk may possibly invade Hatay, the French made a military agreement in which an election would be made in Hatay, although Turkish troops, under the command of Şükrü Kanatlı, entered Hatay before the elections could be held. In a speech, Şükrü Kanatlı said "I brought the greetings of Atatürk, the Army, and the homeland to the people of Hatay." Turks of Hatay welcomed Kanatlı and the crowds shouted "long live Atatürk". The Hatay State was established on September 2, 1938, after the Turkish government hosted elections on August 13. The Hatay Republic joined Turkey on June 29, 1939, after a referendum. Many Arabs doubted the authenticity of the referendum, and claimed that it was rigged in favor of Turks. For the referendum, Turkey crossed tens of thousands of Turks into Alexandretta to vote. Many Arabs also fled to Syria after the annexation of Hatay by Turkey. Arabs of Hatay protested the Turkification, and in 1930, Zaki al-Arsuzi became one of the biggest critics of Turkey's policies, and he became a symbol of the Arab struggle in Hatay.

Syrians condemned France for violating their own mandatory responsibility to protect Syrian lands as part of article 4 of the mandate charter of the Mandate for Syria and the Lebanon. Many Arabs rejected the referendum results and claimed that the number of Turkish voters in the Hatay referendum was much higher than the number of Turks in Hatay. The common sentiment among Syrians is that Hatay was illegally given to Turkey by France. Official Syrian maps continued to show Hatay as part of Syria.

The Syrian community blamed Britain and France for cooperating with Turkey on the Hatay dispute, and accused them of ignoring the Arabs of Hatay and their demands. The President of the Syrian Assembly sent a letter to the French government and the League of Nations Council, declaring that Hatay is Syrian and that Syria does not recognize the accession of Hatay to Turkey.

=== Ba'athist Syria–Turkey tensions and aftermath ===
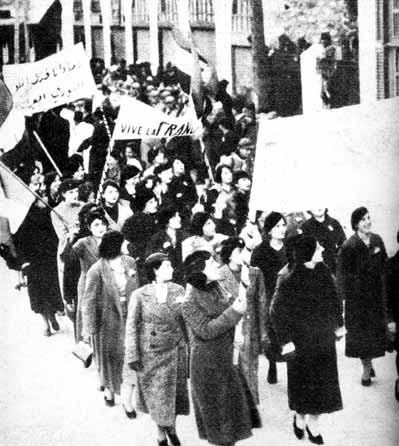
Protests in Damascus by women demonstrators against Turkey's annexation of the Sanjak of Alexandretta in 1939. One of the signs reads: "Our blood is sacrificed for the Syrian Arab Sanjak."

October 21, 1989, an airplane of the General Directorate of Land Registry and Cadastre of Turkey was shot down by a Syrian MiG-21 jet, which violated the border in the Altınözü district of Hatay. Although the Syrian delegation instantly blamed the attack on Armenian Secret Army for the Liberation of Armenia or the Kurdistan Workers' Party, investigations confirmed that it was entirely Syrian pilots who carried out the attack. Outside of Syria, Ba'athist propaganda under Saddam Hussein in Iraq also claimed Hatay, as well as Khuzestan, as Arab lands under occupation. When Bashar al-Assad came power, there was a lessening of the tensions as Assad did not demand that Hatay should be returned to Syria, however no official agreement was made. Under Assad, much progress was achieved, and 50 agreements were signed between Turkey and Syria in December 2009, although a water agreement over the Tigris and Euphrates rivers was halted when Turkey asked Syria to officially recognize Hatay as a Turkish province.

In February 2011, the dispute over Hatay was almost solved, with both countries acknowledging the border, and planning to build a shared dam on the Orontes River. However, as a result of Recep Tayyip Erdoğan staunchly supporting the Free Syrian Army during the Syrian civil war, all progress was halted, and the dispute over Hatay resurfaced. Ba'athist Syrian media increased its broadcasting of documentaries about the Arabness of Hatay, the history of the area, the Turkish annexation, and Turkification. Syrian organizations and parties also demanded an "end to the Turkish occupation". However, Bashar al-Assad had never directly mentioned the Hatay dispute. Tensions rose even further as a result of the demographic change in Hatay due to an increase in Syrian refugees. In addition, the Syrian Democratic Council, established by the Syrian Kurds, also used maps similar to those of the Ba'athist regime. (Note: Only the Kurd-led Syrian Democratic Forces, which is incorporated into the new Syrian Armed Forces, showed Hatay Province as part of Syria on its flag. However, the flag has appeared during the Syrian civil war before the Assad regime collapsed in 2024.) The Turkish government has always considered it an offshoot of the PKK militant organization and has clashed with ANNES on numerous occasions. After the fall of the Assad regime, the Syrian transitional government removed Hatay from some official symbols, and deleted the content that Sanjak of Alexandretta belongs to Syria from the textbook.

== See also ==
- Hatay State
- Sarra Triangle
- Aouzou Strip
- Tomb of Suleyman Shah
