= Özer dynasty =

Turkmen ruling dynasty

Özer (Arabic: اوزر; Ottoman Turkish: اوزر or عزير) was a Turkmen dynasty that ruled a state in the southern part of the Cilician Plain from 1374 the latest to 1516. The state included Payas, Iskenderun, Derbsak, Erzin, and Dörtyol. The village of Özerli, currently a neighbourhood of Dörtyol, was its capital.

== Formation ==
The early history of Özer is wrapped in obscurity. It is thought that its eponymous founder arrived in the Cilician Plain together with the leaders of the Yüregir, Kosun Varsak, Kara Isa, and Koshtemur tribes. Ramadan Beg from the Yüregir tribe formed the Ramadanid Emirate around Adana, to the northwest, while Özer was centred around the area spanning Payas, Iskenderun, Derbsak, Erzin, and Dörtyol. The clan of Gündüz established themselves to the east of Özer, on the eastern side of the Amanos Mountains.

== Bibliography ==
- Har-El, Shai (1995). Struggle for Domination in the Middle East: The Ottoman-Mamluk War, 1485-91. E.J. Brill. ISBN 9004101802. OCLC 624096003.
- Kurt, Yılmaz (2016). "Özeroğulları". TDV Encyclopedia of Islam, Supplement 2 (Kâfûr, Ebü'l-Misk – Züreyk, Kostantin) (in Turkish). Istanbul: Turkiye Diyanet Foundation, Centre for Islamic Studies. pp. 387–388. ISBN 978-975-389-889-8.
- Sümer, Faruk (1 May 1963). "Çukur-ova Tarihine Dâir Araştırmalar (Fetihten XVI. Yüzyılın İkinci Yarısına kadar)". Tarih Araştırmaları Dergisi (in Turkish). 1 (1): 1–98. doi:10.1501/Tarar_0000000310. ISSN 2980-1419.
- Sümer, Faruk (2007). "Ramazanoğulları". TDV Encyclopedia of Islam, Vol. 34 (Osmanpazari – Resuldar) (in Turkish). Istanbul: Turkiye Diyanet Foundation, Centre for Islamic Studies. pp. 442–445. ISBN 978-975-389-456-2.
- Ünlü, Ertan (25 December 2020). "Çukurova'da Bir Türkmen Ailesi: Özeroğulları". Journal of Turkish World Studies (in Turkish). 20 (2): 253–286. doi:10.32449/egetdid.811630. ISSN 2667-6729.
