= Sokollu Mehmet Pasha Caravanserai =

Sokollu Mehmet Pasha caravanserai
- Sokollu Mehmet Paşa kervansarayı
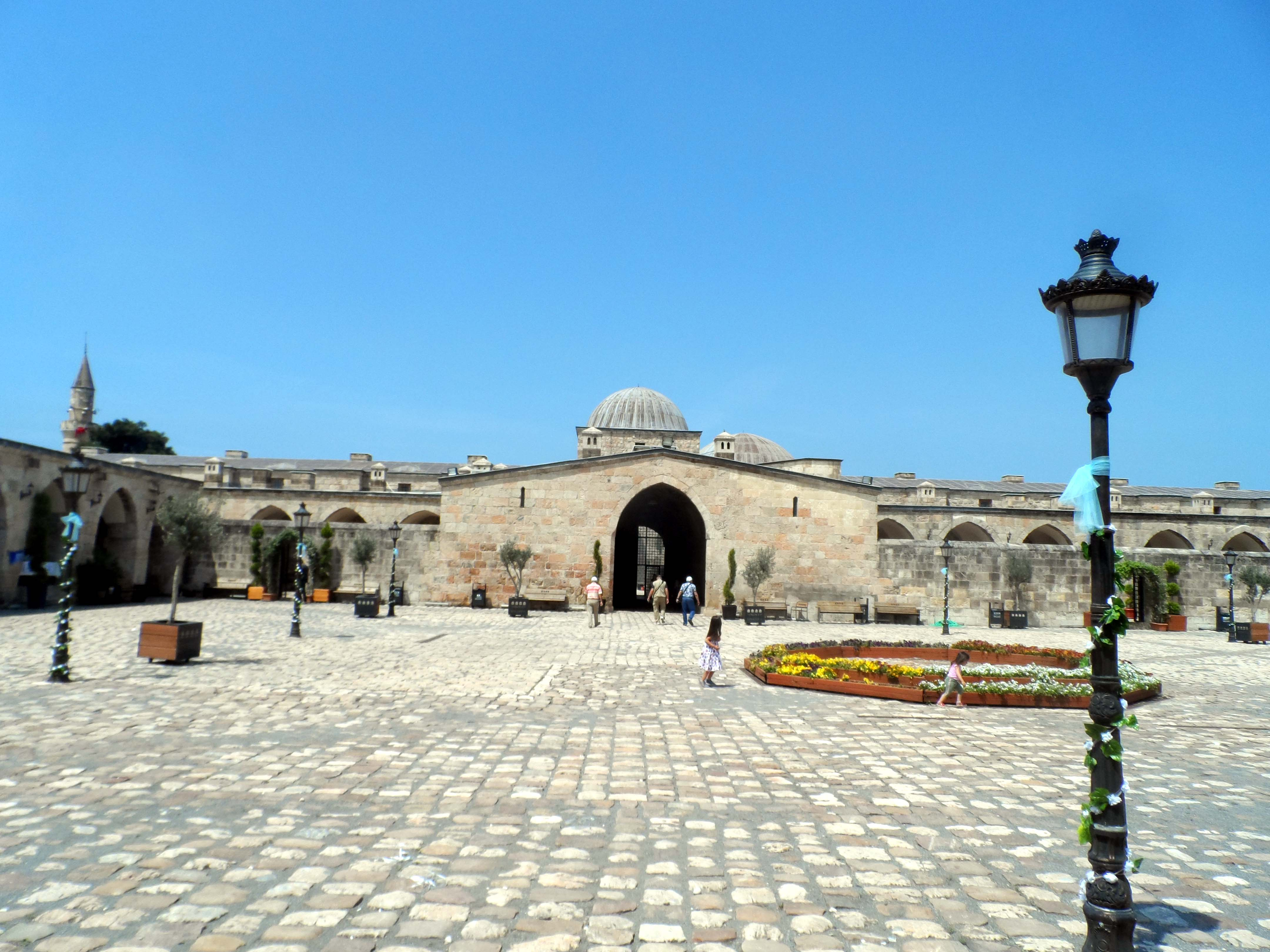
- From the yard
- Interactive map of the Sokollu Mehmet Pasha caravanserai area
- Alternative names: Selim II caravanserai

General information
- Type: caravanserai
- Architectural style: Ottoman architecture
- Location: Payas, İskenderun, Hatay Province, Turkey
- Coordinates: 36.7544°N 36.2038°E
- Elevation: 10 metres (33 ft)
- Construction started: 1571
- Completed: 1574
- Renovated: 2013
- Owner: Municipality

Dimensions
- Other dimensions: 13,000 square metres (140,000 sq ft)

Design and construction
- Architect: Mimar Sinan
- Main contractor: Sokollu Mehmet Pasha

Sokollu Mehmet Pasha caravanserai is a 16th-century caravanserai in Payas, Turkey.

== Location ==
The caravanserai is in Payas town, İskenderun ilçe (district) of Hatay Province. It is easily accessible from Turkish state highway D.817 which connects İskenderun to North. There is also a castle to the west of the caravanserai.

== History ==
Payas is a seaside town on the Mediterranean Sea. In the 1567–68 term, Ottoman government Sublime Porte built a shipyard in Payas in preparation for the Cyprus campaign. After the conquest of Cyprus in 1571, the Grand vizier Sokollu Mehmet Pasha built the caravansarai financing it privately. The architect of the caravanserai was Mimar Sinan. It is not known if Sinan actually supervised the construction. According to the inscription of the caravanserai, it was completed in 1574.

== The building ==
The purpose of the caravanserai was to provide accommodation for merchants traveling to nearby Aleppo, and for the pilgrims on the wat to Mecca. The caravanserai is a rectangular plan building about 13,000 m^{2} (140,000 sq ft). In addition to trade section, it has many units such as a mosque, a hammam, a madrasa etc. Thus, some sources call it a külliye, a building complex. (For the plan of the caravanserai see Plan).

== Present usage ==
The caravanserai was restored by the Payas municipality (now a branch of İskenderun municipality) between 2011 and 2013. The municipality won for this project the ÇEKÜL (Protection and Promotion of the Environment and Cultural Heritage) award. After the restoration, the caravanserai was put into use. The western part of the complex is dedicated to the shops just like the traditional usage while the eastern part is now used by the municipality offices.
