= Menemen F.K. =

Turkish football club

Menemen
- Full name: Menemen Futbol Kulübü
- Founded: 1942
- Ground: Menemen İlçe Stadium, İzmir
- Capacity: 5,000
- Chairman: Bilgin Tokul
- Manager: Yılmaz Vural
- League: TFF 2. Lig
- 2025–26: TFF 2. Lig, Red, 8th of 18
- Website: http://www.menemenfk.org
Home colours	Away colours	Third colours

Menemen Futbol Kulübü, formerly Menemen Belediyespor and Menemenspor, is a Turkish professional football club located in the Menemen district of İzmir that competes in TFF Second League. The club colours are blue and yellow and they play their home matches at Menemen İlçe Stadium.

== Players ==
Former club crest

=== Current squad ===
As of 1 October 2026

Note: Flags indicate national team as defined under FIFA eligibility rules; some limited exceptions apply. Players may hold more than one non-FIFA nationality.

No.	Pos.	Nation	Player
5	MF	TUR	Mustafa Can Birol
6	MF	TUR	Musa Kaan Pehlivan
8	MF	TUR	Burak İngenç
9	FW	TUR	Ömer Ege Ökte
10	FW	TUR	Doğukan Emeksiz
14	MF	TUR	Alican Özfesli
17	FW	TUR	Berkant Kök
23	GK	TUR	İsmail Buğra Torkut
24	DF	TUR	Burak Enes Fıstıkçıoğlu
25	MF	TUR	Yiğit Kerem

No.	Pos.	Nation	Player
26	FW	TUR	Göktürk Efe Görgün
30	GK	TUR	Emir Akay
35	DF	TUR	Eren Fansa
36	MF	TUR	Erkan Gövercin
53	DF	TUR	Hakan Selim Yıldız
55	FW	TUR	Selim Can Sönmez
58	DF	TUR	Fırat Arslan
77	DF	TUR	Eyüp Poyraz
99	GK	TUR	Mehmet Emin Sapancı

=== Out on loan ===
Note: Flags indicate national team as defined under FIFA eligibility rules; some limited exceptions apply. Players may hold more than one non-FIFA nationality.

No.	Pos.	Nation	Player

=== Notable players ===
- İbrahim Dağaşan
- Erman Kılıç
- Gökhan Ünal
- Mert Hakan Yandaş
