= Tayfur Sökmen =

President of Republic of Hatay from 1938 to 1939

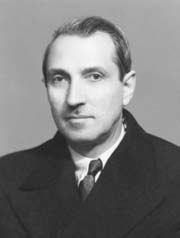
- Tayfur Ata Sökmen

President of Hatay
- In office 5 September 1938 – 23 July 1939
- Deputy: Abdurrahman Melek
- Preceded by: Office established
- Succeeded by: Office abolished (union with Turkey)

Member of the Grand National Assembly
- In office 26 March 1939 – 2 May 1954
- Constituency: Antalya (1939, 1943, 1946) Hatay (1950)

Permanent Member of the Turkish Senate
- In office July 9, 1961–1975
- Preceded by: Permanency created*
- Succeeded by: Permanency abolished*

Personal details
- Born: 1892 Aintab, Aleppo Vilayet, Ottoman Empire
- Died: 3 March 1980 (aged 87–88) Istanbul, Turkey
- Parent: Mustafa Şevki Paşa (father)
- Relatives: Mustafa Murat Sökmenoğlu (son)

Tayfur Ata Sökmen (1892 – 3 March 1980) was the president of the Hatay State during its existence (5 September 1938 – 23 July 1939).

== Life ==
He was born in Gaziantep to a Turcoman family. He graduated from the Rüştiye (high school) in Kırıkhan. During French Mandate in Hatay, he participated in opposition movement. But when he was sentenced with death penalty he escaped to Turkey. Although he was pardoned in 1926, next year he escaped to Turkey once more. In 1935 he was elected MP from Antalya Province. When Hatay was declared an independent state, Sökmen was elected as the president of the Republic. However soon Hatay merged to Turkey. In later years Sökmen was elected MP from Antalya and Hatay Province up to 1954.

According to Turkish constitution of 1961, former presidents had a seat in the Turkish Senate. Being the former president of Hatay, he became a permanent member of the Senate. However he resigned in 1975. He died in Istanbul.

== Sources ==
- Sökmen, Tayfur: Hatay'ın Kurtuluşu İçin Harcanan Çabalar, Ankara 1992, ISBN 975-16-0499-0
