= Hatay State =

Transitional Middle Eastern polity (1938–39)

Hatay State Hatay Devleti (Turkish) État du Hatay (French) دولة حطاي (Arabic) Dawlat Ḥaṭāy
- 1938–1939
- Flag
- Anthem: İstiklal Marşı "Independence March"
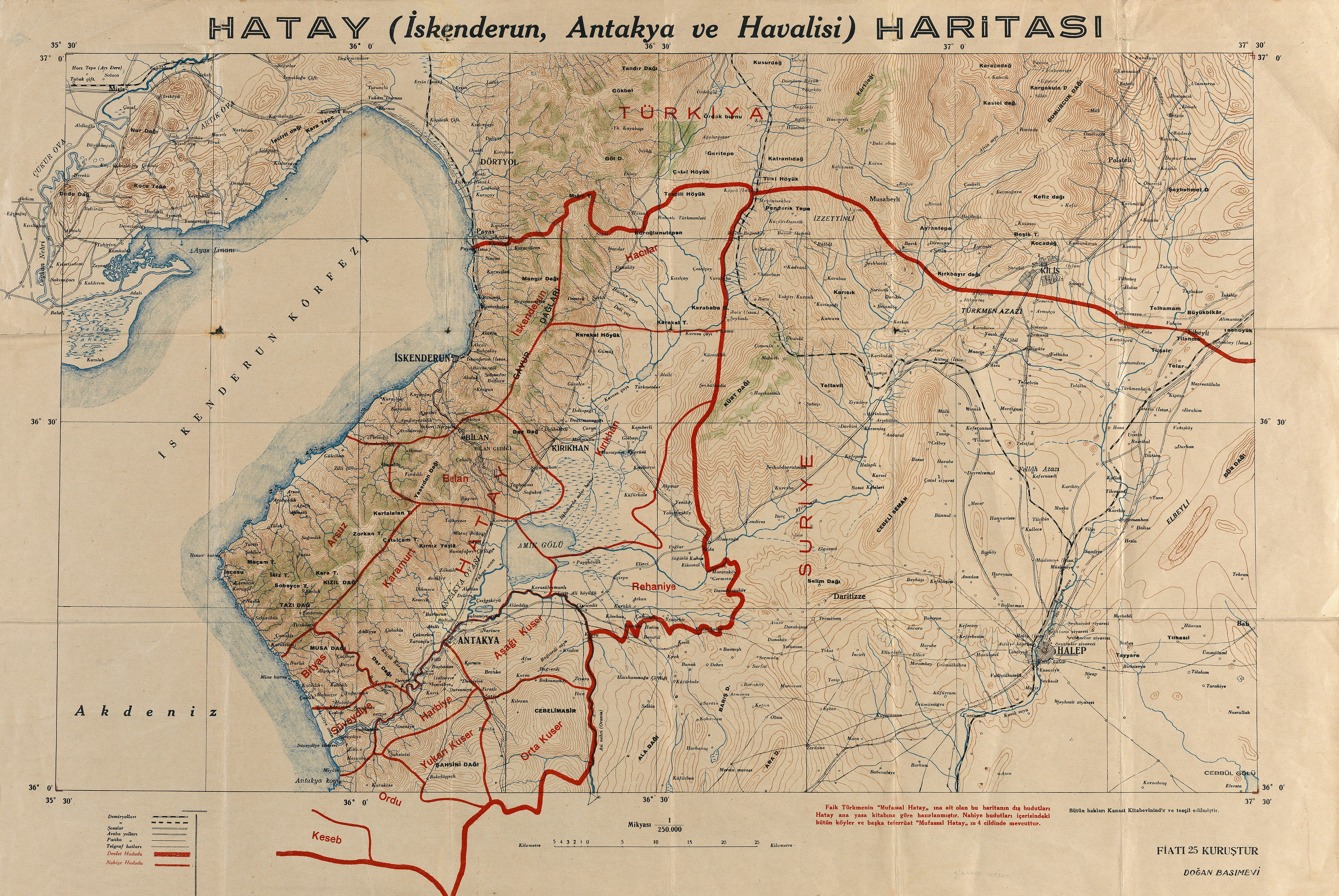
- Map of Hatay in Turkish from the 1930s.
- Status: Transitional government
- Capital: Antakya (Antioch); 36°25′49″N 36°10′27″E
- Official languages: Turkish
- Common languages: Turkish; French; Arabic
- Government: Unitary parliamentary republic
- President
  - 1938–1939: Tayfur Sökmen
- Prime Minister
  - 1938–1939: Abdurrahman Melek
- Legislature: Hatay State People's Assembly
- Historical era: Interwar period
  - Independence: 2 September 1938
  - Union with Turkey (de jure): 29 June 1939
  - Union with Turkey (de facto): 23 July 1939
- Currency: Turkish lira^{a}
| Preceded by | Succeeded by |
| Syrian Republic | Turkey; Hatay Province |
- Today part of: Turkey
- 1. Preceded by the Syrian pound.

Hatay State (Turkish: Hatay Devleti; French: État du Hatay; Arabic: دولة حطاي, romanized: Dawlat Ḥaṭāy), also known informally as the Republic of Hatay (Arabic: جمهورية حطاي, romanized: Jumhūriyyat Ḥaṭāy), was a transitional nation that existed from 2 September 1938 to 29 June 1939, being located in the territory of the Sanjak of Alexandretta of the French Mandate of Syria. The state was transformed de facto into the Hatay Province of Turkey on 7 July 1939, de jure joining the country on 23 July 1939.

== History ==
=== Background ===
Formerly part of the Aleppo Vilayet of the Ottoman Empire, the Sanjak of Alexandretta was occupied by France at the end of the First World War and constituted part of the French Mandate of Syria.

The Sanjak of Alexandretta was an autonomous sanjak from 1921 to 1923, as a result of the Franco-Turkish Treaty of Ankara, as it had a large Turkish community as well as its Arab and Armenian population. Then it was attached to the State of Aleppo, then in 1925 it was directly attached to the State of Syria, still with a special administrative status.

Marshal Mustafa Kemal Pasha (later known as Mustafa Kemal Atatürk), refused to accept the Sanjak of Alexandretta as part of the Mandate and, in a speech on 15 March 1923 in Adana, he described the Sanjak as "A homeland where Turks lived for centuries and can't be a captive at the hands of enemy". Turkish policy aimed at annexing the Sanjak of Alexandretta when the French mandate of Syria was due to expire in 1935. Turks in Alexandretta initiated reforms in the style of Atatürk's, and formed various organisations and institutions in order to promote the idea of union with the Republic of Turkey.

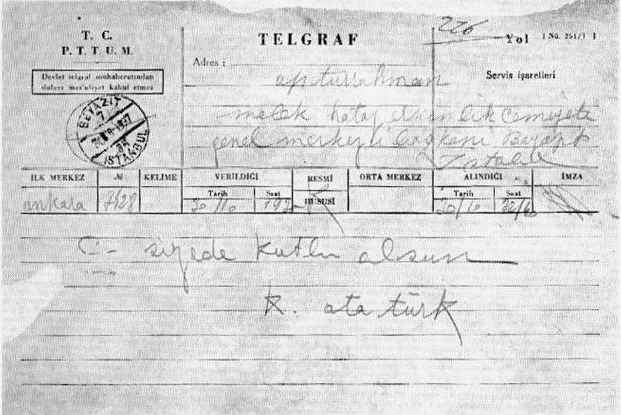
The telegram of congratulation sent by Mustafa Kemal Atatürk after the proclamation of Hatay State.

In 1936, the elections returned two Syrian independentist MPs (favouring the independence of Syria from France) in the sanjak, and this prompted communal riots and passionate articles in the Turkish and Syrian press. In particular, Arab nationalist Zaki al-Arsuzi was influential.

In response, the Atatürk government coined the name Hatay for the Sanjak of Alexandretta, as a reference to Hittites (Syro-Hittite states), and raised the "Issue of Hatay" (Turkish: Hatay Meselesi) at the League of Nations. On behalf of the League of Nations, representatives of France, the United Kingdom, the Netherlands, Belgium and Turkey prepared a constitution for the sanjak. The new statute came into power in November 1937, the sanjak becoming 'distinct but not separated' from Syria on the diplomatic level, linked to both France and Turkey for military matters.

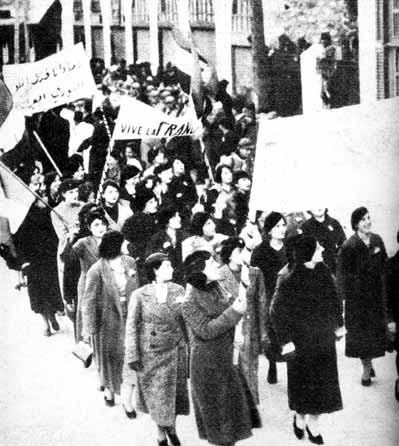
Protests in Damascus in 1939 by women demonstrators against the secession of the Sanjak of Alexandretta, and its subsequent joining into Turkey as the Hatay Province. One of the signs reads: "Our blood is sacrificed for the Syrian Arab Sanjak."

On 2 September 1938, the sanjak assembly proclaimed the Sanjak of Alexandretta as the Hatay State. The State lasted for one year under joint French and Turkish military supervision.

On 29 June 1939, following a referendum, the Hatay legislature voted to disestablish the Hatay State and join Turkey. This referendum has been labelled both "phoney" and "rigged", as the Turkish government organised tens of thousands of Turks originating from but not living in Alexandretta to return to and register as citizens and vote. The French encouraged the annexation, hoping it would act as an incentive to Turkey to reject an alliance with Nazi Germany.

Hashim al-Atassi, the President of the Syrian Republic, resigned in protest at the continued French intervention in Syrian affairs, maintaining that the French were obliged to refuse the annexation under the Franco-Syrian Treaty of Independence of 1936.

=== Legislature ===
The Hatay State Peoples Assembly (Turkish: Hatay Devleti Millet Meclisi) was a parliament that consisted of 40 members, consisting of 22 Turks, nine Alawites, five Armenians, two Orthodox Greeks and two Sunni Arabs. The Hatay government utilized the parliamentary system while it was active.

=== Annexation ===
On 7 July 1939, the Grand National Assembly of Turkey approved the law establishing the Hatay Province and incorporating districts from Adana Province (then Seyhan Province) and Gaziantep Province. By 23 July 1939, the last vestiges of the French Mandate authorities had left Antakya, and the territory was fully annexed by Turkey. The result was a flight of many Arabs and Armenians to Syria. The region's Armenian population, having been survivors of the Armenian genocide, migrated to the French Mandate of Syria due to fears of Turkish prosecutions and refusal to contemplate Turkish sovereignty. Following the annexation, almost the entire Armenian population of Hatay had settled in Aleppo, with many others moving to Lebanon where they founded the modern town of Anjar near the ruins of its historic castle.

== Constitution ==
The constitution of the Hatay State had additionally been mirrored from Turkey.

== Population and demographics ==
According to the estimates of the French High Commission in 1936, out of a population of 220,000, 39% were Turks, 28% Alawite Arabs, 11% Armenians, 10% Sunni Arabs, 8% other Christians and 4% were Circassians, Kurds and Jews. Although Turks formed the largest single ethno-religious group, Arabic speakers, including Sunnis, Alawites and Christians, were more numerous.

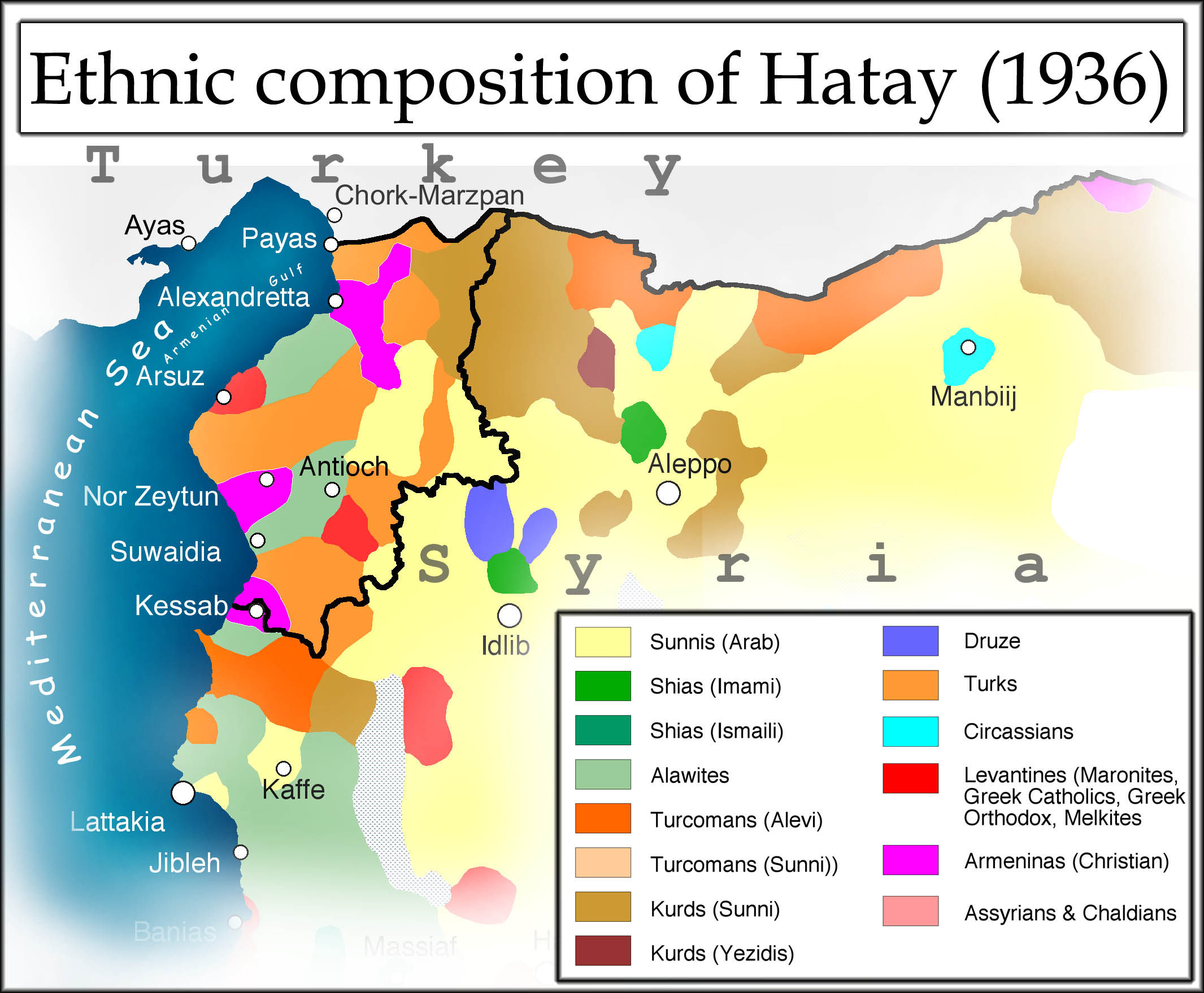
Ethnic composition of Hatay (1936)

Population of Hatay State in 1936 according to the French census
| Ethnoreligious groups | Inhabitants | % |
| Turks | 85,800 | 39% |
| Alawite Arabs | 61,600 | 28% |
| Armenians | 24,200 | 11% |
| Sunni Arabs | 22,000 | 10% |
| Melkites, Greeks and other Christians | 17,600 | 8% |
| Circassians, Jews, Kurds | 8,800 | 4% |
| Total | 220,000 | 100% |

In 1937, most sources pointed that out of a total population of 186,000 people (which is according to the French government's 1932 report) in sanjak of Alexandretta, 85,000 people were Turks, 25,000 were Armenians, and the remainder was largely made up of Arabs with some Greeks, Jews, Kurds, and Circassians.

== See also ==
- Hatay dispute
- Syrian Turkmen
- Kars Republic

== Sources ==
- Sökmen, Tayfur: Hatay'ın Kurtuluşu İçin Harcanan Çabalar, Ankara 1992, ISBN 975-16-0499-0.
- Abdurrahman Melek, Hatay Nasıl Kurtuldu, Türk Tarih Kurumu, 1966.
