= Eren Fansa =

Turkish footballer (born 2003)

Personal information
- Date of birth: 3 June 2003 (age 23)
- Place of birth: Hatay, Turkey
- Position: Centre-back

Team information
- Current team: Menemen
- Number: 35

Youth career
- 2011–2021: Hatayspor

Senior career*
Years	Team	Apps	(Gls)
2021–2022	Hatayspor	1	(0)
2022	Diyarbekirspor	0	(0)
2022–2023	Antakya Belediyespor		
2023–2024	Bornova 1877 SY	18	(3)
2024–	Menemen	37	(3)
- * Club domestic league appearances and goals as of 1 October 2026

Eren Fansa (born 3 June 2003) is a Turkish professional footballer who plays as a centre-back for TFF 2. Lig club Menemen.

== Career ==
A youth product of Hatayspor, Fansa joined their youth academy at the age of 9. He started training with their first team in 2021. He made his professional debut with Hatayspor in a 5–2 Süper Lig win over Yeni Malatyaspor on 28 February 2022, coming on as a substitute in extra time.
