= St. Paul's Church, Antakya =

Destroyed church in Antakya, Turkey

St. Paul's Church
- Aziz Pavlus Ortodoks Kilisesi
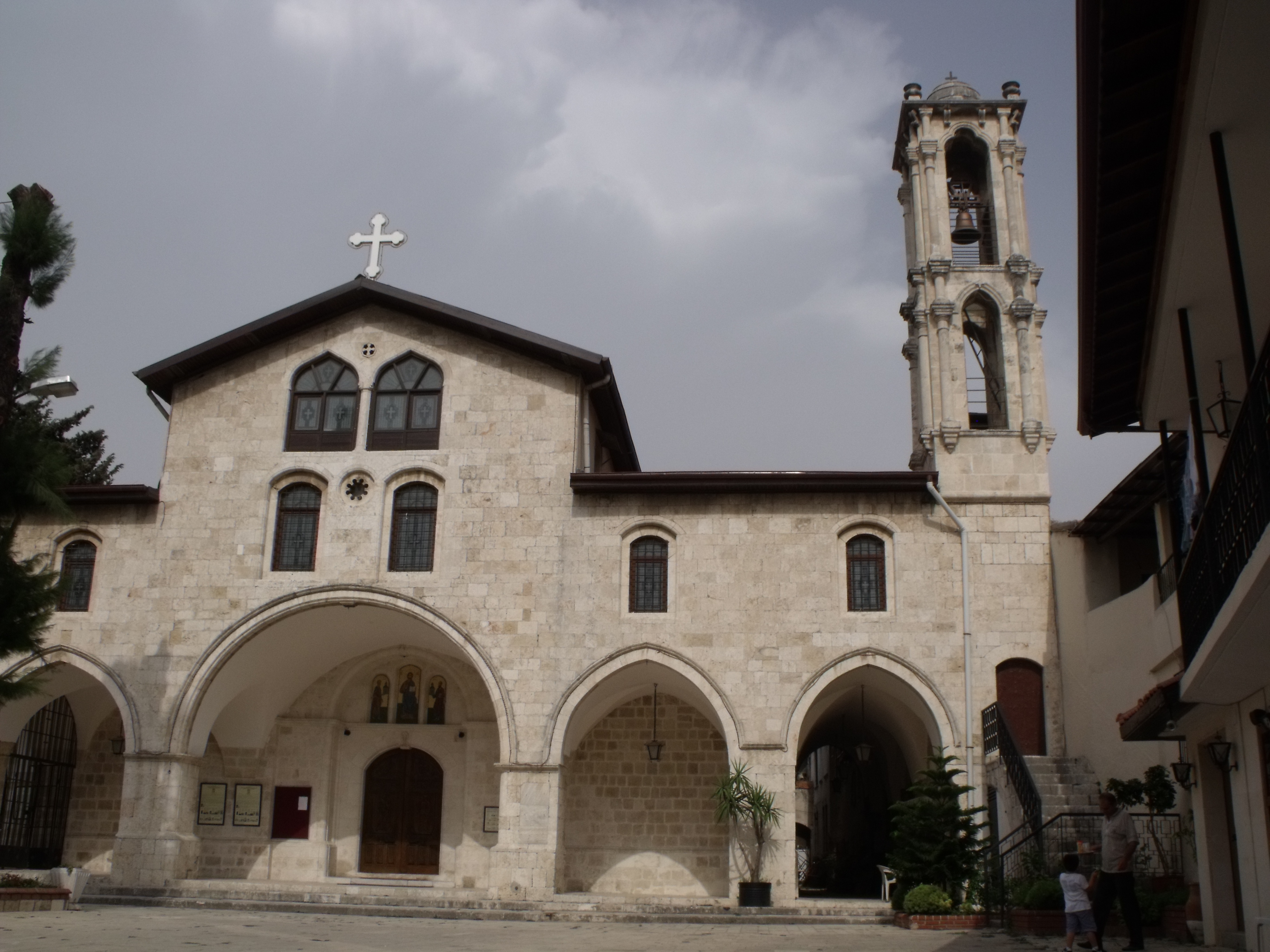
- The church in 2011
- St. Paul's Church
- Location: Antakya, Turkey
- Denomination: Greek Orthodox Church

History
- Status: Church

St. Paul's Church is a historic Greek Orthodox church in Antakya, Turkey. It is a member of the Greek Orthodox Patriarchate of Antioch. It was largely destroyed in the 2023 Turkey–Syria earthquake.

== History ==
Located in the city centre of Antakya, Turkey, construction on the church started in 1830. After being damaged in the 1872 Amik earthquake, it was completely rebuilt and opened again in 1900.

The church was largely destroyed in the 2023 Turkey–Syria earthquake. Images released by TRT World showed heavy damage to the church, although some drawings on the walls and the bell managed to survive. All buildings on the street it was located on collapsed as well.

== Gallery ==
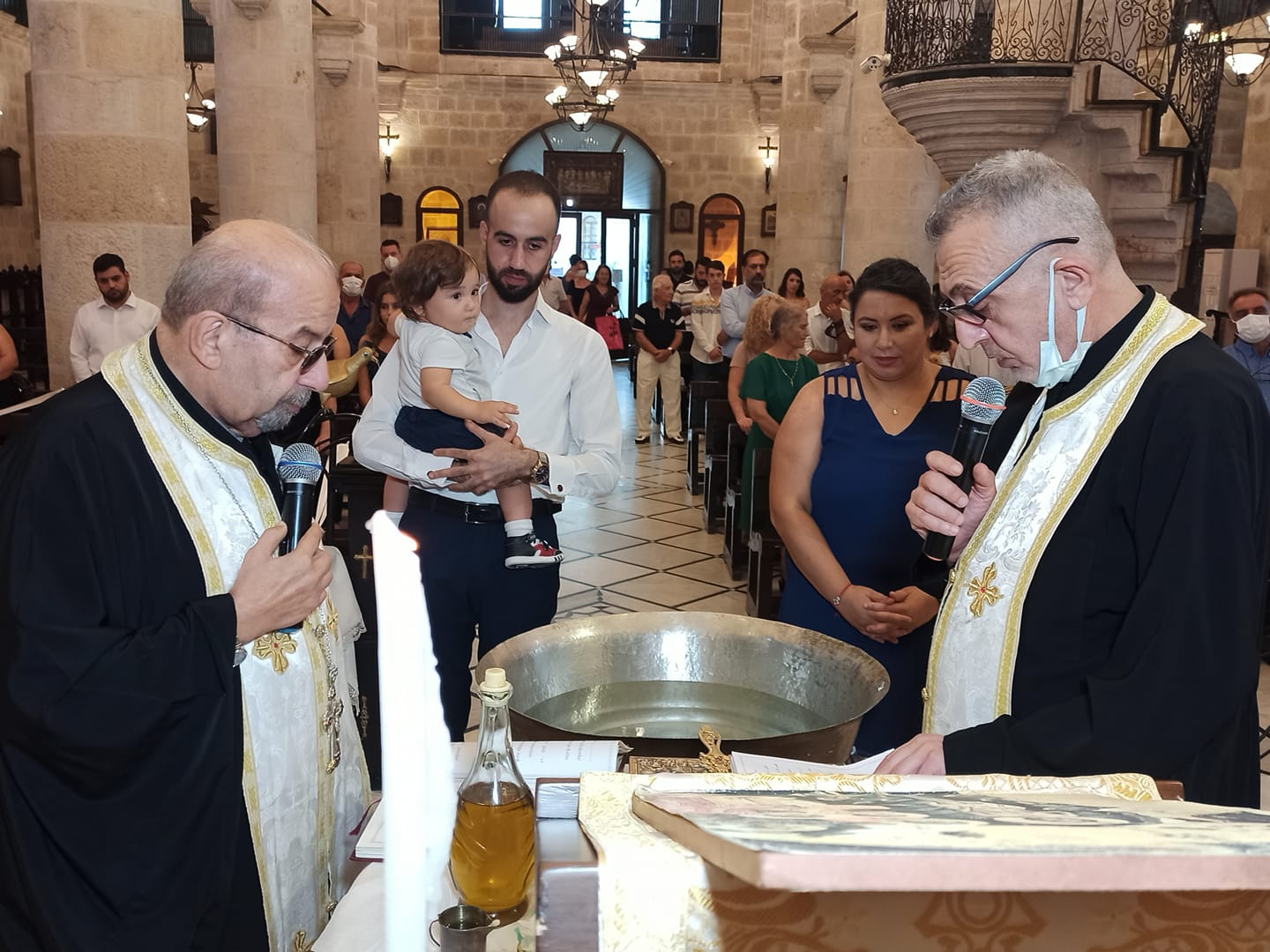
A baptism at St. Paul's Church.

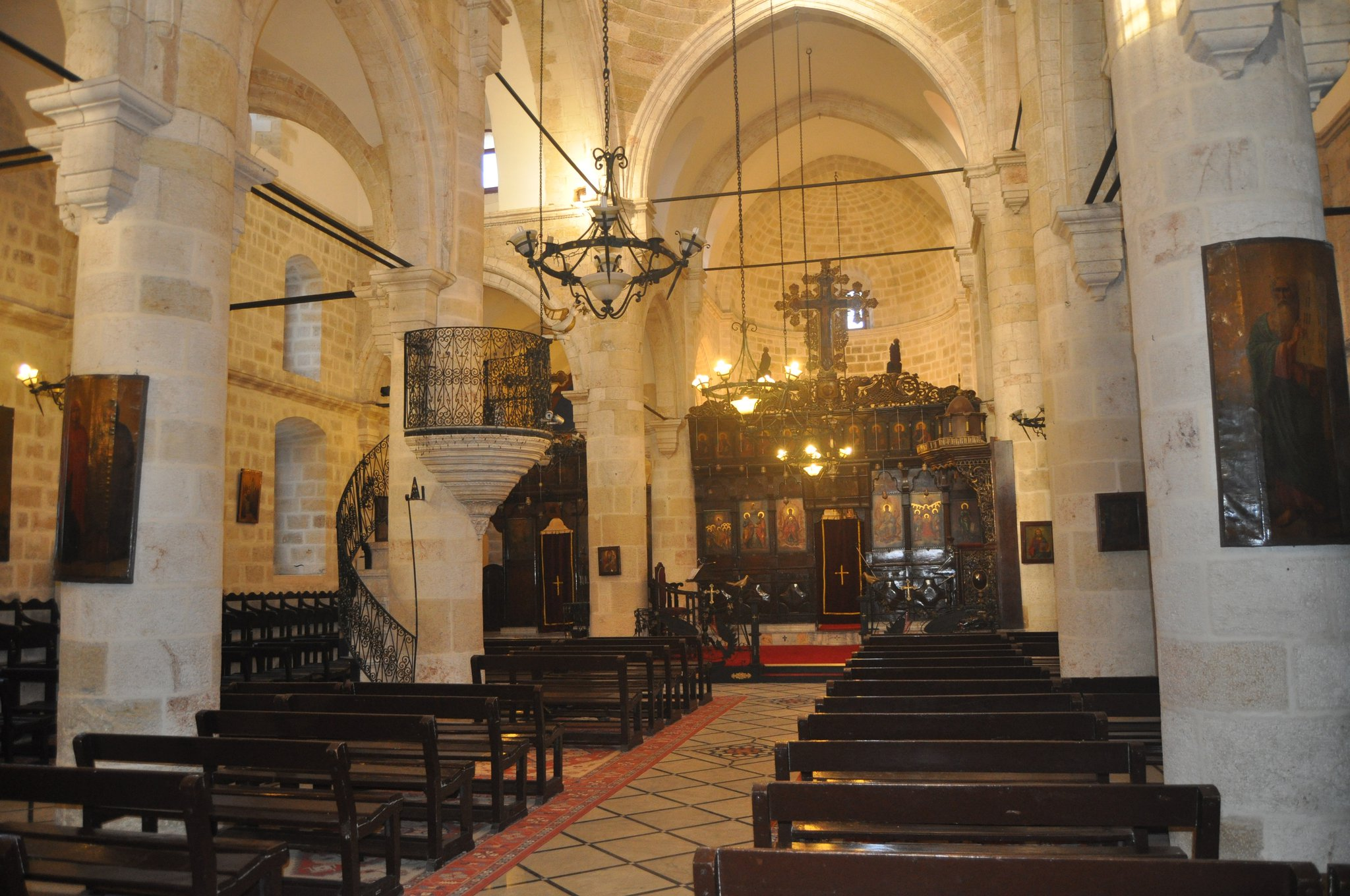
Cathedral interior.
