= Erzin, Turkey =

Erzin
- District and municipality
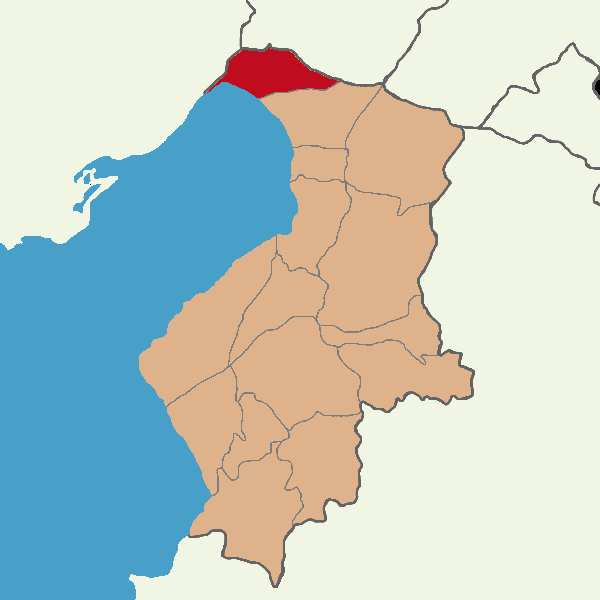
- Map showing Erzin District in Hatay Province

- Location in Turkey
- Coordinates: 36°57′12″N 36°12′12″E
- Country: Turkey
- Province: Hatay

Government
  - Mayor: Ökkeş Elmasoğlu (CHP)
- Area: 258 km^{2} (100 sq mi)
- Elevation: 178 m (584 ft)
- Population (2022): 41,558
  - Density: 161/km^{2} (417/sq mi)
- Time zone: UTC+3 (TRT)
- Postal code: 31960
- Area code: 0326
- Website: www.erzin.bel.tr

Erzin, also known as Yeşilkent, is a municipality and district of Hatay Province, Turkey. Its area is 258 km^{2}, and its population is 41,558 (2022). It is on the Mediterranean coast. The mayor is Ökkeş Elmasoğlu (CHP).

== Geography ==
Erzin is on the west-facing flanks of the Nur Mountains and runs down to the Gulf of İskenderun on the Mediterranean coast. The climate is warm and wet in winter, hot and extremely humid in summer, when most people retreat further up into the pine-covered hills, or to the beach.

Erzin is an attractive district well known for its high-quality citrus fruits, the major economic activity of the district. Grains and vegetables are also grown, especially since irrigation works were built in the 1960s. Today 65,000 m^{2} are planted with grains and another 65,000 m^{2} with all kind of citrus fruits including Navel orange, grapefruit and tangerines. Other income is generated by holidaymakers on the coast. The main road and the railway line between the cities of Osmaniye and İskenderun run through here, and Iskenderun with its large steel plant has an effect on the economy of the whole region.

Erzin itself is a quiet market town providing government services to the district.

== Composition ==
There are 21 neighbourhoods in Erzin District:

- Aşağıburnaz
- Bahçelievler
- Başlamış
- Cumhuriyet
- Gökdere
- Gökgöl
- Hürriyet
- İsalı
- İstiklal
- Karamustafalı
- Kızlarçayı
- Kuyuluk
- Mahmutlu
- Mustafalı
- Şükrü Paşa
- Turunçlu
- Yeni
- Yeşiltepe
- Yoncadüzü
- Yukarıburnaz
- Mavuklu

== History ==
The area was settled by Anatolian beyliks, and was brought into the Ottoman Empire by Mavuk Paşa after the defeat of the Beyliks at the Battle of Otlukbeli in 1473.

Mavuk Paşa was an Ottoman military and administrative leader of Turkmen origin who played a key role in the settlement (iskan) policies of the Chukurova and Hatay regions, shaping the local history of Erzin.

Following the Battle of Otlukbeli in 1473, Mavuk Paşa was tasked with securing the strategic corridor between the Amanos Mountains and the Gulf of Iskenderun. He settled his nomadic Turkmen clan (the Mavuklu) around Erzin, pioneering the area's transition to agriculture and permanent urbanization. In exchange for safeguarding local trade and pilgrimage routes, he was granted administrative authority over the region.

=== 2023 Turkey-Syria Earthquake ===
Erzin was the sole district of Hatay Province to have none of its buildings collapse in the aftermath of the 2023 Turkey–Syria earthquake, despite being closer to the epicenter than other cities such as Iskenderun and Antakya which suffered greater damage. The mayor, Ökkeş Elmasoğlu claimed it was due to strict construction of housing; the district mostly consists of single houses, local authorities prohibited unsafe and substandard construction to a much greater degree than nearby areas, and apartment blocks do not have many floors. Even older structures such as houses from 60 years ago survived the earthquake. Additionally, the city had fared relatively well during previous earthquakes. However, engineers and scientists (such as Omer Emre) attributed the town escaping unscathed to geological factors, such as Erzin's relatively higher sea level compared to surrounding towns, and it being built upon harder ground, consisting of bedrock and coarser grains than sand, compared to softer, water-laden sediments like that of cities to the south.

A municipal worker estimated that about 20,000 people had come to the town in the aftermath of the earthquake.

== International relations ==
Erzin is twinned with the following cities:

- Freiberg am Neckar, Germany
- Quba, Azerbaijan, since 2011
