= Abdurrahman Melek =

First and only prime minister of the Hatay State

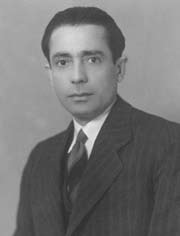
Dr. Abdurrahman Melek

Abdurrahman Melek (1896 in Antakya – 13 January 1978 in Ankara), was a Turkish politician, who served as the Prime Minister of the Republic of Hatay founded following the constitution approved by the league of Nations on 19 May 1937.

He started practicing medicine, after studying at the Aleppo Sultaniye, Beirut University and graduating from the Istanbul University Faculty of Medicine.

He became one of the predominant leaders in the effort to integrate Hatay into Turkey. He served as the Istanbul director of the Hatay Maturity Society (“Hatay Erginlik Cemiyeti”), took part in the Turkish Delegation negotiating with the French in Geneva. Preceding the foundation of the State of Hatay, he was appointed Governor of Hatay and prepared the foundation of the State of Hatay. He was appointed as prime minister of that state with the approval of Atatürk. While Prime Minister of Hatay, and before the integration of Hatay into Turkey, he was elected to the Turkish Grand National Assembly for Gaziantep (March 1939). He served as a member of parliament for Gaziantep in the 6., 7., and 8. terms, and for Hatay in the 9. term.

In later years (1959–1961), he served as a member of the Board of Directors of the Central Bank of the Republic of Turkey.

He was involved from beginning to end in the struggle to get Hatay back from the French and published his memoirs in a book titled “How Hatay Was Liberated” (“Hatay Nasıl Kurtuldu”), published by the Turkish History Institute in 1966.

Dr. Abdurrahman Melek died in Ankara on 13 January 1978.
