= Payas =

Town in Turkey

- District and municipality
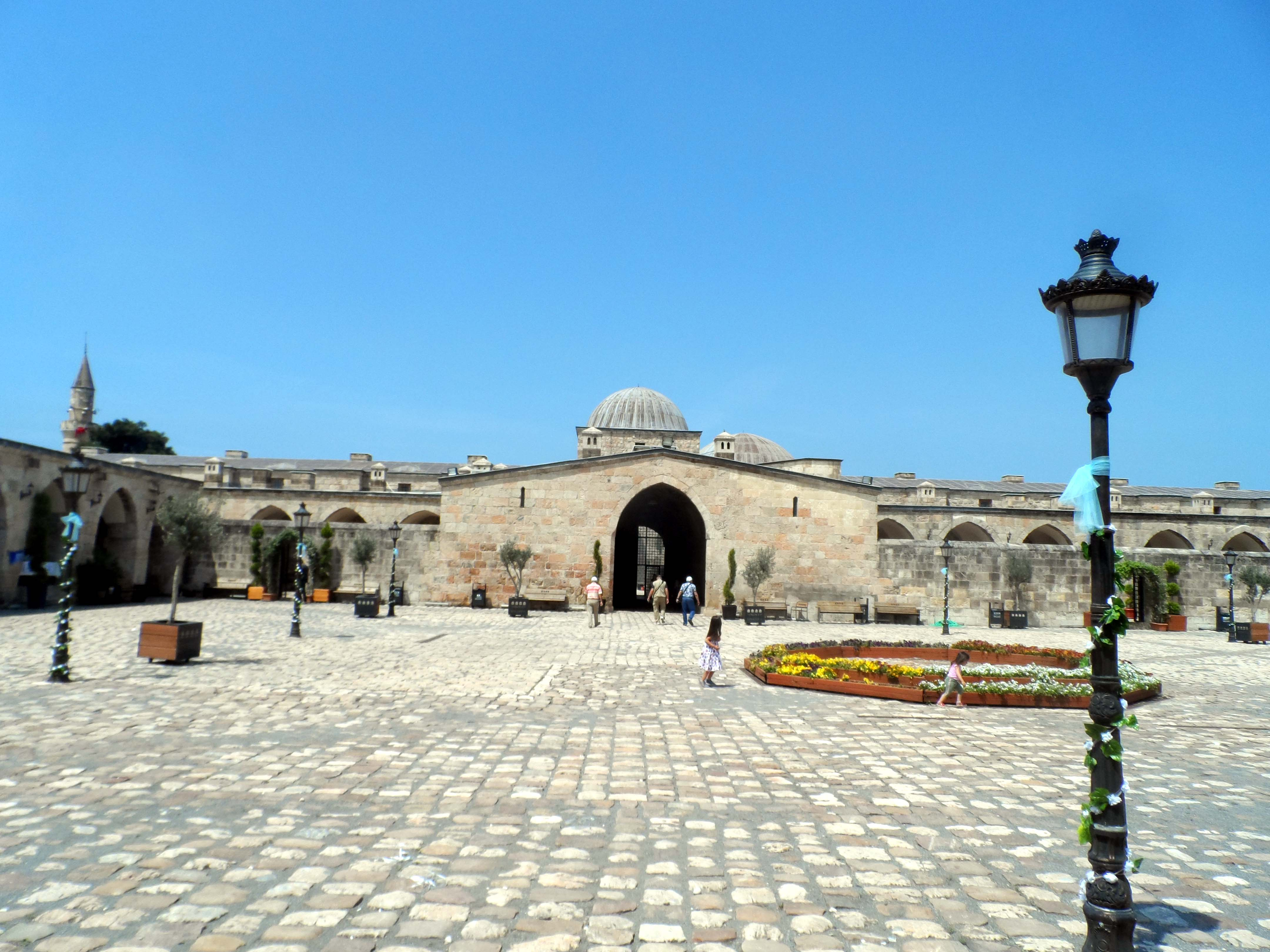
- Sokollu Mehmet Pasha Caravanserai

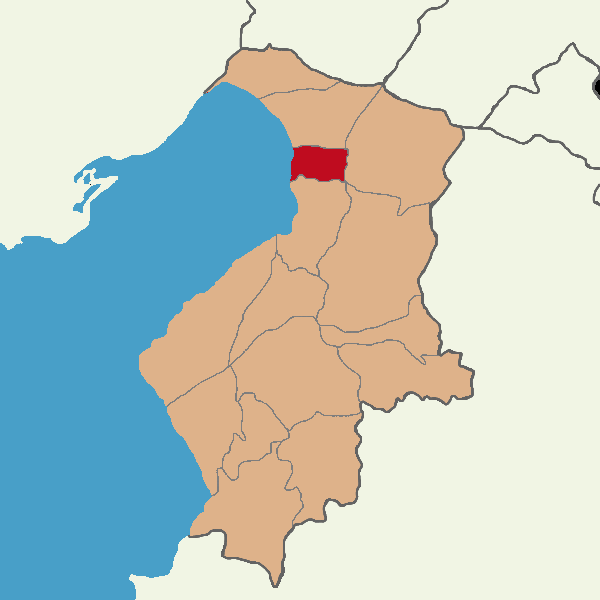
- Map showing Payas District in Hatay Province

- Location within Turkey
- Coordinates: 36°45′N 36°13′E
- Country: Turkey
- Province: Hatay

Government
  - Mayor: Bekir Altan (AKP)
- Area: 157 km^{2} (61 sq mi)
- Elevation: 36 m (118 ft)
- Population (2022): 43,919
  - Density: 280/km^{2} (725/sq mi)
- Time zone: UTC+3 (TRT)
- Area code: 0326
- Website: www.payas.bel.tr

Payas (Arabic: بياس, romanized: Byās; Ancient Greek: Παίας, romanized: Paías; Western Armenian: Բայաս, romanized: Payas) is a municipality and district of Hatay Province, Turkey. Its area is 157 km^{2}, and its population is 43,919 (2022). The district Payas was created in 2013 from part of the district of Dörtyol.

== Geography ==
Payas is a Mediterranean coastal town. Distance to Dörtyol at the north is 12 kilometres (7.5 mi), to İskenderun at the south is 20 kilometres (12 mi) and to Antakya (the province center) is 84 kilometres (52 mi).

== History ==
Payas and its vicinity have been inhabited throughout history. Ancient names of the town were Baias and Bayyas. During the Byzantine–Sasanian War of 602–628, Payas was one of the theaters of war between Heraclius and Khosrow II. In the second half of the 7th century, Payas became a part of the rising Arabic Empire. Seljuk Turks annexed Payas towards the end of the 11th century. The town was contested between the Turks and the Byzantines, but was captured by the armies of the First Crusade in 1097. It became part of the Armenian Kingdom of Cilicia soon thereafter. In 1268, the region was captured by the Mamluk Sultanate. Later, the town became a part of the Beylik of Dulkadir, and a part of the Ottoman Empire after the campaign of Selim I in 1517. In the 1567–68 term, Ottoman government Sublime Porte built a shipyard in Payas in preparation for the Cyprus campaign. After the conquest of Cyprus in 1571, the Grand vizier Sokollu Mehmed Pasha built a caravansarai, financing it privately. The two fortifications at Payas have been the subject of several surveys. Both are Ottoman-period constructions.

In the late 18th century, Payas was specifically controlled by the Turkoman family of Kuchuk-Ali, who appeared in records from 1760 onwards, as an offshoot of the Özer dynasty according to the local poet Dadaloğlu. In the same century, Kurdish local chiefs controlled much of the hill country between Marash and Payas. Kurdish bandits frequently attacked caravans in the area, prompting the governor of Adana to appeal for help, to no avail.

Following a period of short French occupation after the First World War, Payas became a part of Turkey unlike most other parts of the Hatay Province, where French occupation continued till 1938, when the rest of Hatay was annexed by Turkey.

== Composition ==
There are 12 neighbourhoods in Payas District:

- Çağlalık
- Cumhuriyet
- Fatih
- İstiklal
- Karacami
- Karbeyaz
- Karşı
- Kozludere
- Kürtül
- Sincan
- Yenişehir
- Yıldırım Beyazıt

== Demographics ==
According to travellers Carl Humann and Otto Puchstein, during the 19th century, the town of Payas was inhabited by Turks and included 50 homes. The settlements in the vicinity, though, also included Armenians but very few Alawites.

== Economy ==
Payas was an agricultural town in the early years of the Republic of Turkey. In the 1970s Payas became an industrial town with the establishment of the İskenderun Iron and Steel Factory. Today, the iron and steel factory within Payas is Turkey's second big iron-steel factory, and it contributes to Turkey's economy in great scales as well as the organized industry zone, coal enterprises and iron-producing mills. Because of this, 70 hot iron mills were established since 1970. Mills still provide much employment for people. The city receives immigrants due to the variety of employment opportunities also. The organized industrial zone has accrued with growing industrialization, and this zone has built on 100 hectares. Consequently, there are about 1100 workplaces in Payas. Some of them are transportation companies, and 700–800 trucks transport coal and iron to big factories in a day. Livestock and agriculture areas are limited, because of developed industry and trade. And there is a local fishery in Payas; there are about 70 fishermen.

== Bibliography ==
- Gould, Andrew G. (October 1976). "Lords or Bandits? The Derebeys of Cilicia". International Journal of Middle East Studies. 7 (4). Cambridge University Press: 485–506. JSTOR 162506.
