= Hatay Province =

Province of Turkey

Hatay Province Hatay ili
- Province and metropolitan municipality
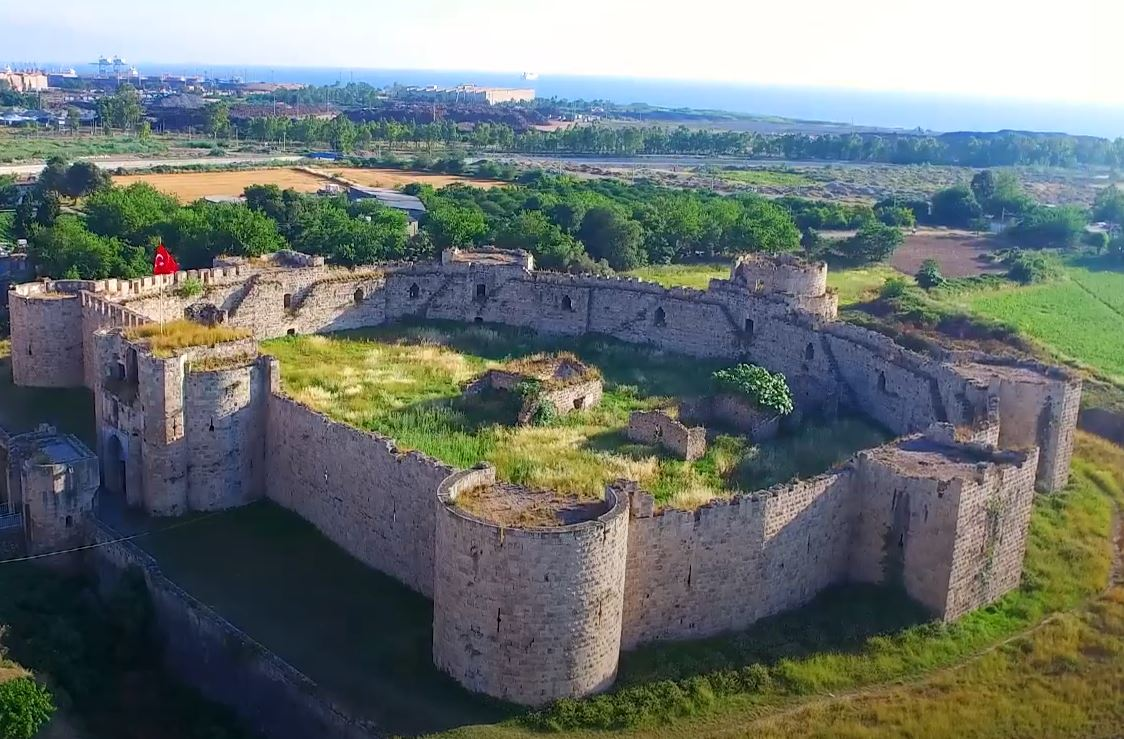
- Payas Castle, Hatay

- Logo

- Location of the province within Turkey
- Coordinates: 36°25′49″N 36°10′27″E
- Country: Turkey
- Seat: Antakya

Government
  - Mayor: Mehmet Öntürk (AK Party)
  - Vali: Mustafa Masatlı
- Area: 5,524 km^{2} (2,133 sq mi)
- Population (2022): 1,686,043
  - Density: 305.2/km^{2} (790.5/sq mi)
- Time zone: UTC+3 (TRT)
- Area code: 0326
- ISO 3166 code: TR-31
- Website: www.hatay.bel.tr www.hatay.gov.tr

Hatay Province (Turkish: Hatay ili, pronounced [ˈhataj]) is the southernmost province and metropolitan municipality of Turkey. Its area is 5,524 km^{2} (2,133 sq mi), and its population is 1,686,043 (2022). It is situated mostly outside Anatolia, along the eastern coast of the Levantine Sea. The province borders Syria to its south and east, the Turkish province of Adana to the northwest, Osmaniye to the north, and Gaziantep to the northeast. It is partially situated on the Cilician Plain, a large fertile plain along the Cilicia region. Its administrative capital is Antakya (ancient Antioch), making it one of the three Turkish provinces not named after its administrative capital or any settlement. The second-largest city is İskenderun (formerly Alexandretta). Sovereignty over most of the province was disputed with neighbouring Syria, which claimed that the province had a demographic Arab majority, and was separated from its territory in violation of the terms of the French Mandate for Syria that was established on the heels of World War I; however, the issue has remained largely dormant since the thawing of Syrian-Turkish relations in the 2000s.

== History ==
=== Antiquity ===
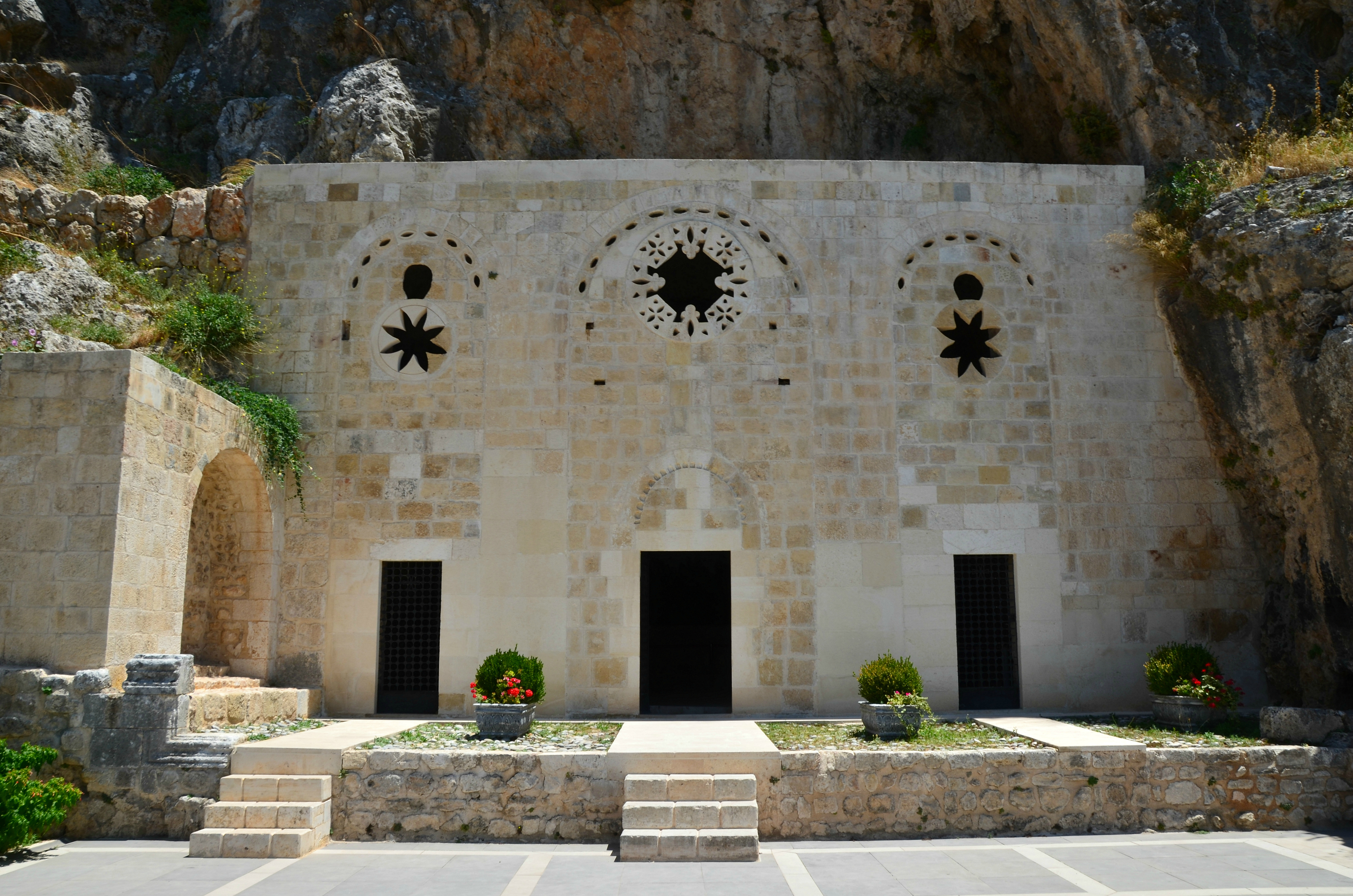
Church of Saint Peter in Hatay Province.

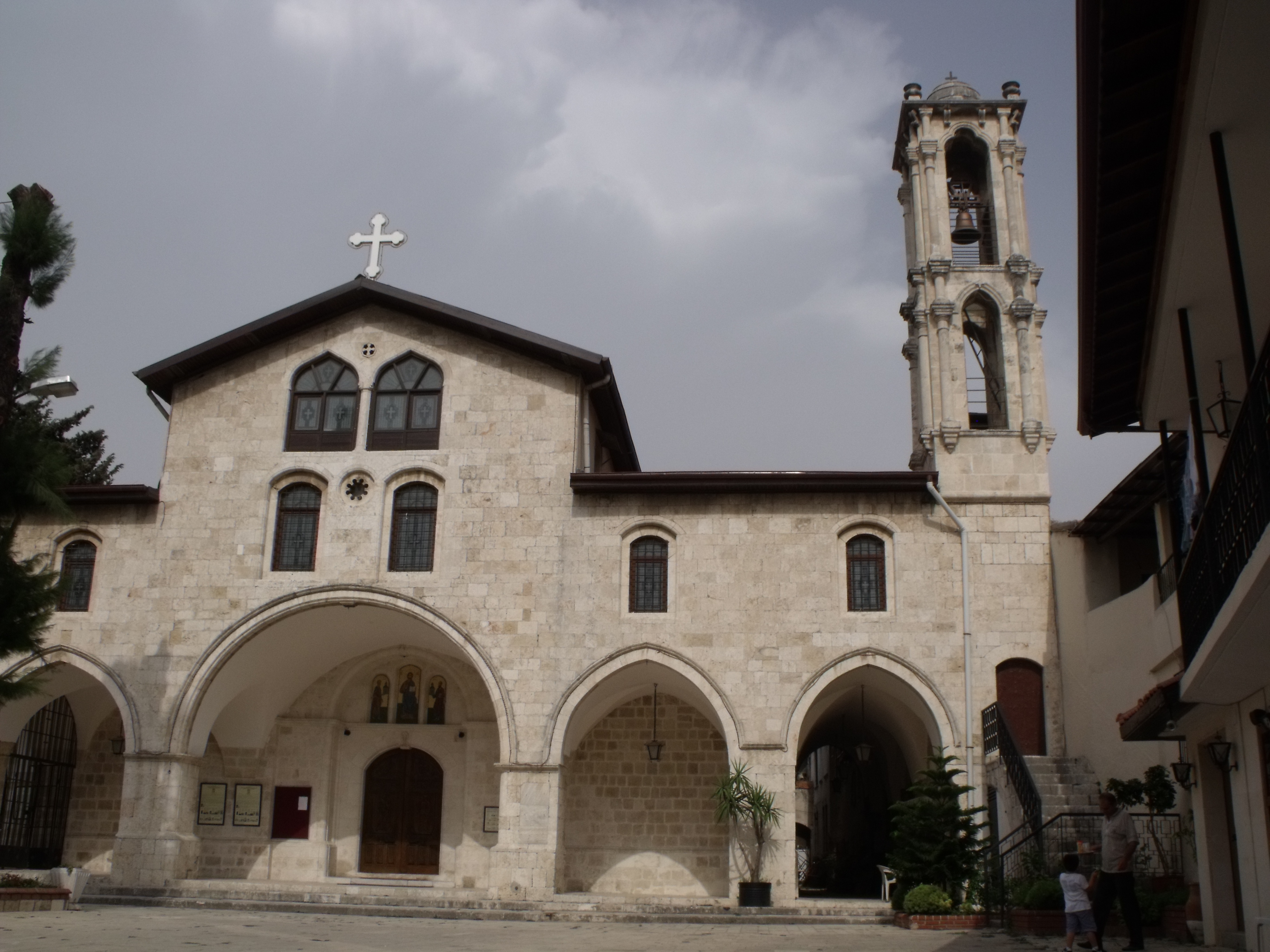
St. Paul's Church, Antakya

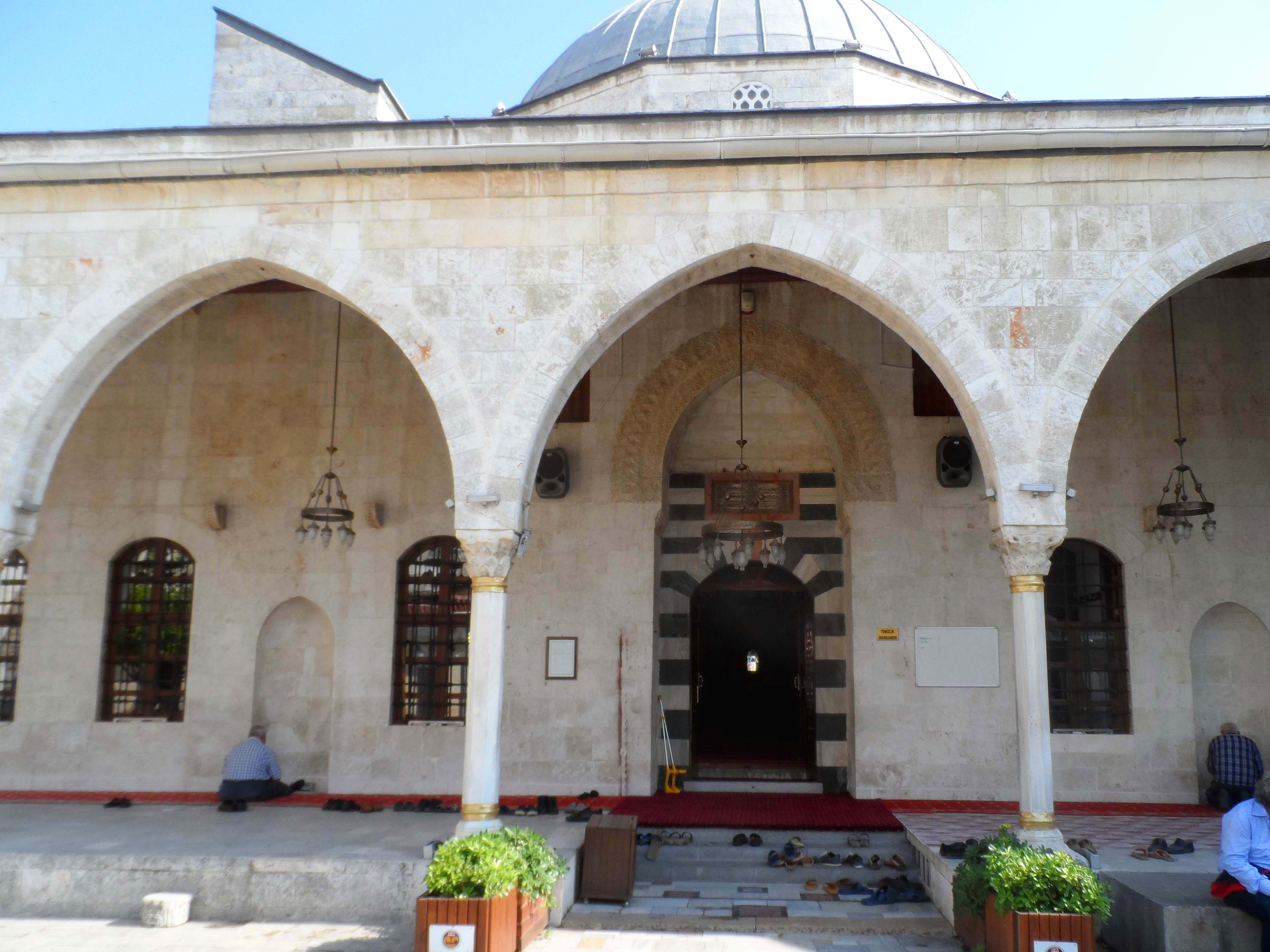
Habib-i Nejjar Mosque, Antakya

Settled since the early Bronze Age, Hatay was once part of the Akkadian Empire, then of the Amorite Kingdom of Yamhad. Later, it became part of the Kingdom of Mitanni, then the area was ruled by a succession of Hittites and Neo-Hittite peoples that later gave the modern province of Hatay its name.

The Neo-Hittite kingdom of Palistin was also located here.

The area came under the control of Assyrians (except for a brief occupation by Urartu), and later the Neo-Babylonians and the Persians.

The region was the centre of the Hellenistic Seleucid Empire, home to the four Greek cities of the Syrian tetrapolis (Antioch, Seleucia Pieria, Apamea, and Laodicea). From 64 BC onwards the city of Antioch became an important regional centre of the Roman Empire.

Among the famous archaeological sites in the province are Alalakh, Tell Tayinat, Tell Judaidah, and Antioch.

=== Medieval era ===
The area was conquered by the Rashidun Caliphate in 638 and later it came under the control of the Umayyad and Abbasid Arab dynasties. Tulunids briefly ruled it before Abbasid rule was restored. From the 10th century onwards, the region was controlled by the Aleppo-based Hamdanids after a brief rule of Ikhshidids. In 969 the city of Antioch was recaptured by the Byzantine Empire. It was conquered by Philaretos Brachamios, a Byzantine general in 1078. He founded a principality from Antioch to Edessa. It was captured by Suleiman I, who was Sultan of Rum (ruler of Anatolian Seljuks), in 1084. It passed to Tutush I, Sultan of Aleppo (ruler of Syria Seljuks), in 1086. Seljuk rule lasted 14 years until Hatay's capture by the Crusaders in 1098, when parts of it became the centre of the Principality of Antioch. At the same time, much of Hatay was part of the Armenian Kingdom of Cilicia, who subsequently allied with the Mongols and took control of the Principality of Antioch in 1254. Hatay was captured from the Mongol-Armenian alliance by the Mameluks in 1268, who subsequently lost it to Timur (Tamerlane) at the start of the 15th century.

=== Sanjak of Alexandretta ===
By the time it was taken from the Mameluks by the Ottoman Sultan Selim I in 1516, Antakya was a medium-sized town on 2 square kilometres (0.77 sq mi) of land between the Orontes River and Mount Habib Neccar. Under the Ottomans the area was known as the sanjak (or governorate) of Alexandretta. Gertrude Bell in her book Syria: The Desert & the Sown published in 1907 wrote extensively about her travels across Syria including Antioch & Alexandretta and she noted the heavy mix between Turks and Arabs in the region at that time.

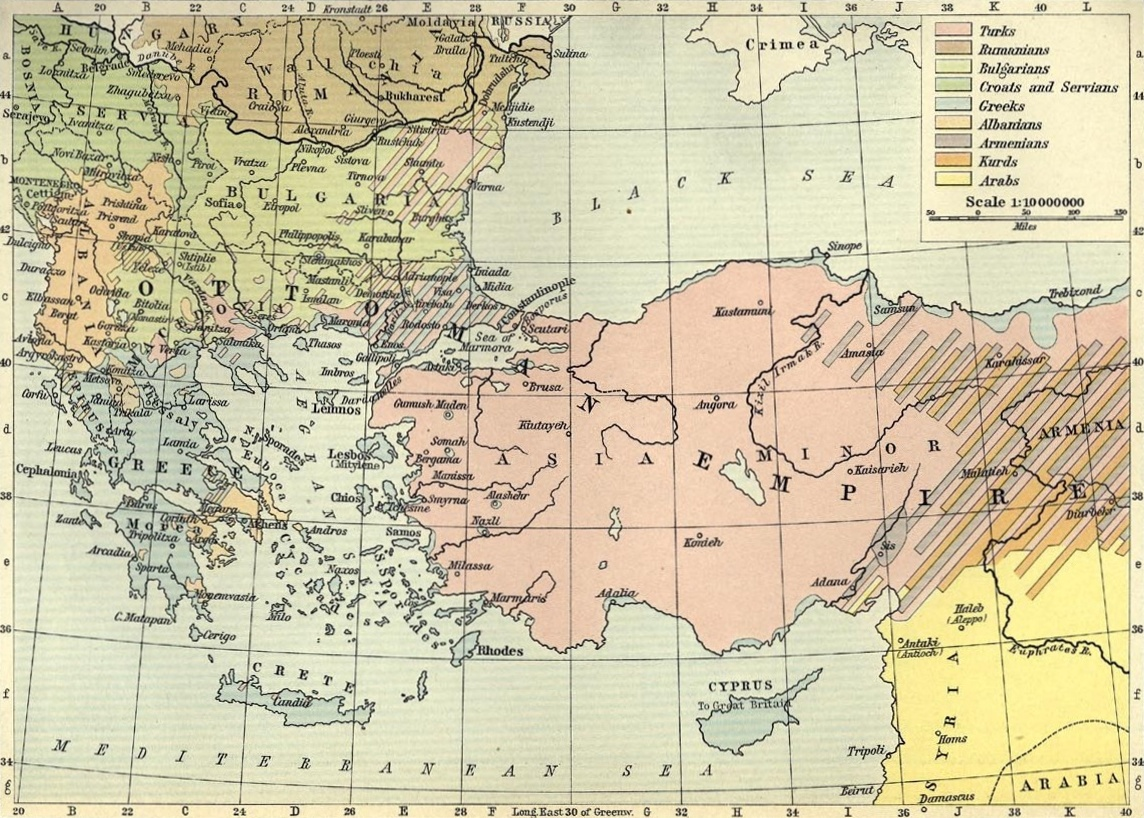
Ethnic groups in the Balkans and Asia Minor, early 20th Century, Historical Atlas, 1911

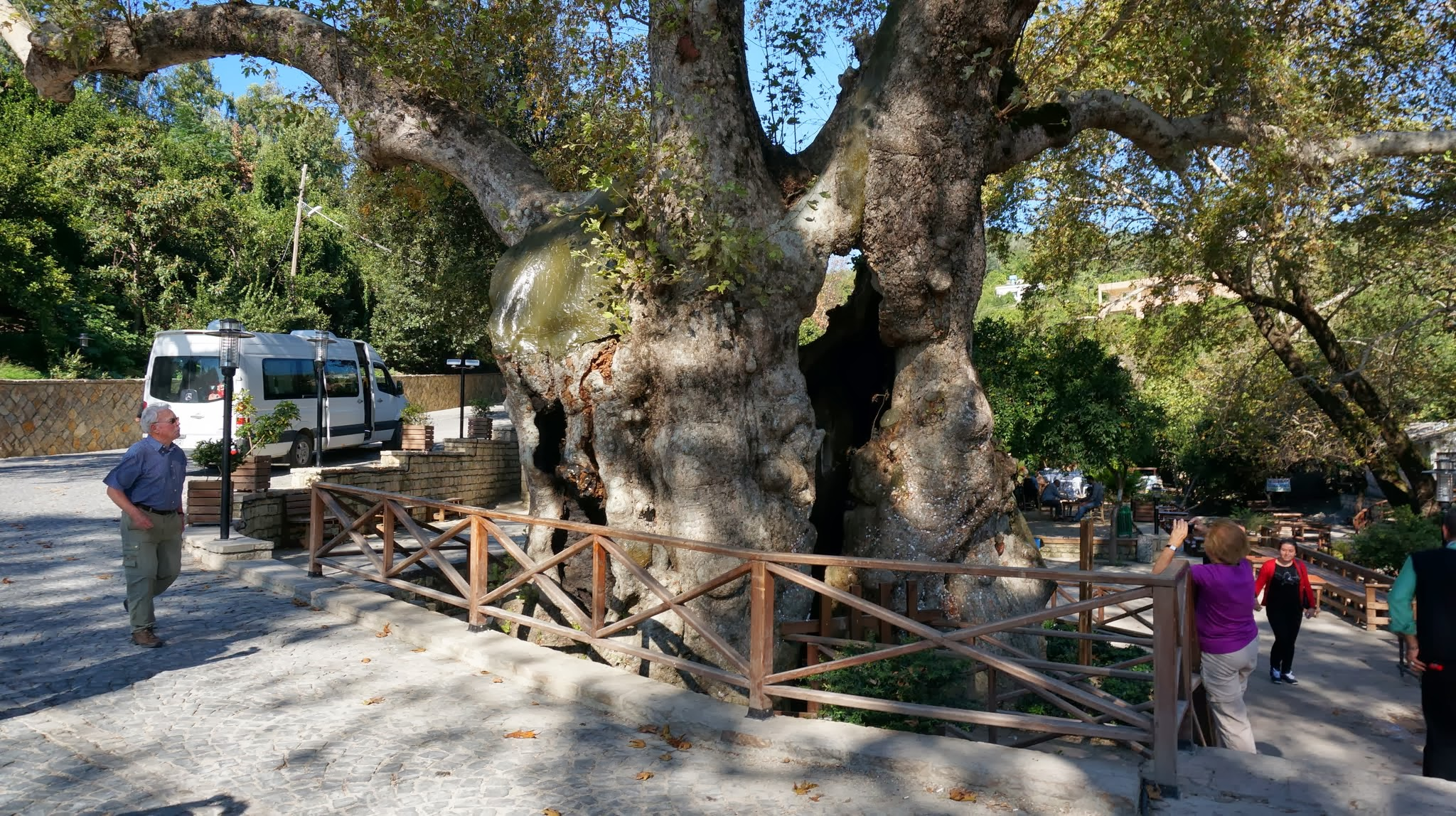
The Hıdırbey Musa Ağacı (Moses Tree) in Samandağ

Many say that Alexandretta was traditionally part of Syria. Maps as far back as 1764 confirm this. During the First World War, most of Syria was occupied by the British but under the Armistice of Mudros, Hatay remained part of the Ottoman Empire. Nevertheless, after the armistice it was occupied by the British, an arrangement which was not accepted by the Ottomans. Later, the province was handed over to France along with the rest of Syria.

After World War I and the Turkish War of Independence, the Ottoman Empire was disbanded and the modern Republic of Turkey was created. Alexandretta was not part of the new republic. It was placed under the French mandate of Syria after the Allies and Turkey signed the Treaty of Sèvres, which was neither ratified by the Ottoman parliament nor by the Turkish National Movement in Ankara. The subsequent Treaty of Lausanne also put Alexandretta within Syria. The document detailing the boundary between Turkey and Syria around 1920 and subsequent years is presented in a report by the Official Geographer of The Bureau of Intelligence and Research of the US Department of State. A French-Turkish treaty of 20 October 1921 rendered the Sanjak of Alexandretta autonomous, and it remained so from 1921 to 1923. Out of 220,000 inhabitants in 1921, 87,000 were Turks. Along with Turks the population of the Sanjak included: Arabs of various religious denominations (Sunni Muslims, Alawites, Greek Orthodox, Greek Catholics, Maronites); Jews; Assyrians; Kurds; and Armenians. In 1923 Hatay was attached to the State of Aleppo, and in 1925 it was directly attached to the French mandate of Syria, still with special administrative status.

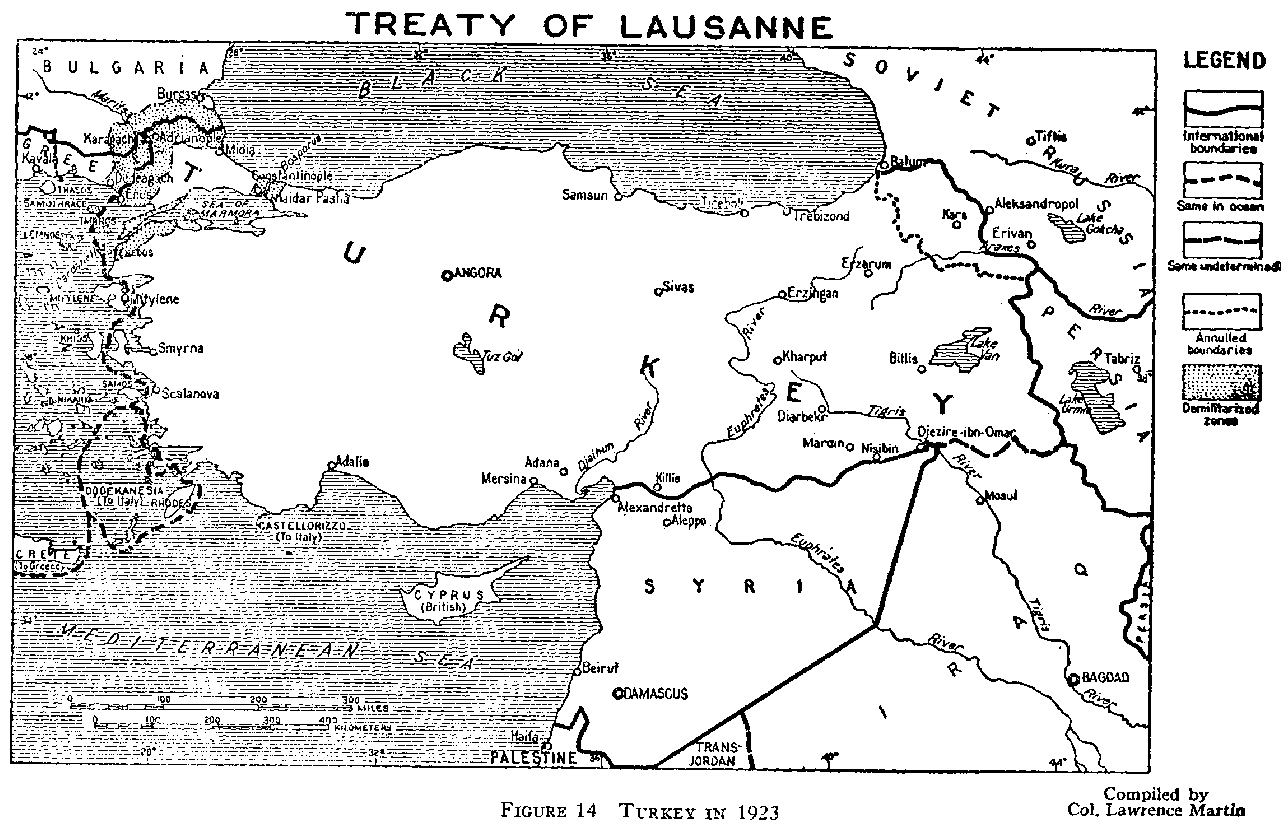
Turkish borders according to the Treaty of Lausanne, 1923

Despite this, a Turkish community remained in Alexandretta, and Mustafa Kemal said that Hatay had been a Turkish homeland for 4,000 years. This was due to the contested nationalist pseudoscientific Sun Language Theory prevalent in the 1930s in Turkey, which presumed that some ancient peoples of Anatolia and the Middle East, such as the Sumerians and Hittites, hence the name Hatay, were related to the Turks. Whereas, the Turks first appeared in Anatolia during the 11th century, when the Seljuk Turks occupied the eastern province of the Abbasid Empire and captured Baghdad. Resident Arabs organised under the banner of Arabism, and in 1930, Zaki al-Arsuzi, a teacher and lawyer from Arsuz on the coast of Alexandretta published a newspaper called 'Arabism' in Antioch that was shut down by Turkish and French authorities.

The 1936 elections returned two MPs favouring the independence of Syria from France, and this prompted communal riots as well as passionate articles in the Turkish and Syrian press. This then became the subject of a complaint to the League of Nations by the Turkish government concerning alleged mistreatment of the Turkish populations. Atatürk demanded that Hatay become part of Turkey claiming that the majority of its inhabitants were Turks. However, the French High Commission estimated that the population of 220,000 inhabitants was made up of 46% Arabs (28% Alawites, 10% Sunni, 8% Christians), 39% Turks, 11% Armenians, while the remaining 4% was made up of Circassians, Jews, and Kurds. The sanjak was given autonomy in November 1937 in an arrangement brokered by the League. Under its new statute, the sanjak became "distinct but not separated" from the French mandate of Syria on the diplomatic level, linked to both France and Turkey for defence matters.

=== Hatay State ===
Hatay State (Turkish: Hatay Devleti, French: État du Hatay, Arabic: دولة حطاي Dawlat Ḥaṭāy), also known informally as the Republic of Hatay, was a transitional political entity that existed from 7 September 1938, to 29 June 1939, in the territory of the Sanjak of Alexandretta of the French Mandate of Syria.

In early March 1939 French authorities were willing to return Hatay Province (then within the French Mandate of Syria) back to Turkey for a quid pro-quo. The quid pro-quo was a willingness to sign a mutual pact (between Turkey and France) against potential European aggression (either Italian aggression or German aggression). The goal of the French was to ensue Turkey did not go into the German-Italian sphere of influence.

The state was transformed de jure into the Hatay Province of Turkey on 7 July 1939, de facto joining the country on 23 July 1939.

=== Hatay Province of Turkey ===
On 29 June 1939, following a referendum, Hatay became a Turkish province. This referendum has been labelled both "phoney" and "rigged", and is seen as a way for the French to cede the area to Turkey, in the hope that they would turn on Hitler. For the referendum, Turkey moved tens of thousands of Turks into Alexandretta so they could vote. In two government communiqués which were issued in 1937 and 1938, the Turkish government asked all local government authorities to make lists of all of their employees who were originally from Hatay. Those employees whose names were listed were then sent to Hatay so they could register as citizens and vote.

Syrian President Hashim al-Atassi resigned in protest at continued French intervention in Syrian affairs, maintaining that the French were obliged to refuse the annexation under the Franco-Syrian Treaty of Independence of 1936.

The Hassa district of Gaziantep, Dörtyol district (Erzin was nahiya of it) of Adana were then incorporated into Hatay. As a result of the annexation, a number of demographic changes occurred in Hatay. During the six months following the annexation, inhabitants over the age of 18 were given the right to choose between staying and becoming Turkish citizens, or emigrating to the French Mandate of Syria or Greater Lebanon and acquiring French citizenship. If they chose to emigrate, they were given 18 months to bring in their movable assets and establish themselves in their new states. Almost half of the Sunni Arabs left. Many Armenians also left and 1,068 Armenian families were relocated from the six Armenian villages of Musa Dagh to the Beqaa Valley which is located in Lebanon. Many of these Armenians had fled for their lives and settled in the French Mandate of Syria because they were survivors of the genocide which had previously been committed by the Ottoman Empire. The total number of people who left for Syria was estimated to be 50,000 including 22,000 Armenians, 10,000 Alawites, 10,000 Sunni Arabs and 5,000 Arab Christians.

=== Turkish–Syrian dispute ===
For much of its premodern history, Alexandretta, with its capital city Antioch, was considered as part of Bilad al-Sham, the area known today as Syria. In Ottoman times, Hatay was part of the Vilayet of Aleppo in Ottoman Syria. In 1920 the sanjak (province) of Alexandretta was awarded to Syria by the League of Nations in the guise of a French mandate. In 1936 Alexandretta became the subject of a complaint to the League of Nations by Turkey, which claimed that the privileges of the Turkish plurality in the sanjak were being infringed. (In 1921, there were 87,000 Turks amid a population of 220,000.) Unlike other regions historically belonging to Syrian provinces (such as Aintab, Kilis and Urfa), Alexandretta was confirmed as Syrian territory in the Treaty of Lausanne agreed upon by Kemal Atatürk but was granted a special autonomous status because it contained a Turkish plurality. However, culminating a series of border disputes with France-mandated Syria, Atatürk obtained in 1937 an agreement with France recognising Alexandretta as an independent state, and in 1939 this state, called the Republic of Hatay, was annexed to Turkey as the 63rd Turkish province following a controversial referendum. Syria bitterly disputed both the separation of Alexandretta and its subsequent annexation to Turkey.

Syria maintains that the separation of Alexandretta violated France's mandatory responsibility to maintain the unity of Syrian lands (article 4 of the mandate charter). It also disputes the results of the referendum held in the province because, according to a League of Nations commission that registered voters in Alexandretta in 1938, Turkish voters in the province represented no more than 46% of the population. Syria continues to consider Hatay part of its territory as of the 2010s, and shows it as such on its maps. At the same time, Turkey and Syria have strengthened their ties and opened the border between the two countries.

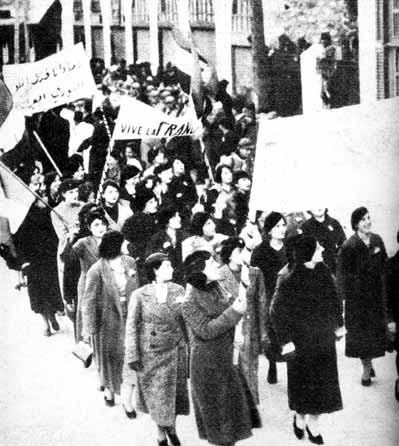
Protests in Damascus in 1939 by women demonstrators against the secession of the Sanjak of Alexandretta, and its subsequent joining into Turkey as the Hatay Province. One of the signs reads: "Our blood is sacrificed for the Syrian Arab Sanjak."

Syrians hold the view that this land was illegally ceded to Turkey by France, the mandatory occupying power of Syria in the late 1930s. Syria still considers it an integral part of its own territory. Syrians call this land Liwa' aliskenderun (Arabic: لواء الاسكندرون) rather than the Turkish name of Hatay. Official Syrian maps still show Hatay as part of Syria.

Under the leadership of Syrian President Bashar al-Assad from 2000 onwards, there was a lessening of tensions over the Hatay issue. Indeed, in early 2005, when visits from Turkish President Ahmet Necdet Sezer and Turkish Prime Minister Recep Tayyip Erdoğan opened a way to discussions between two states. These discussions resulted with the Syrian government agreeing to end its demand that the province should be returned under Syrian sovereignty as a condition to end hostilities; however, there was no official announcement by the Syrians relinquishing their rights of sovereignty.

Following changes to Turkish land registry legislation in 2003, a large number of properties in Hatay were purchased by Syrian nationals, mostly people who had been residents of Hatay since the 1930s but had retained their Syrian citizenship and were buying the properties that they already occupied. By 2006, the amount of land owned by Syrian nationals in Hatay exceeded the legal limit for foreign ownership of 0.5%, and sale of lands to foreigners was prohibited.

There has been a policy of cross border cooperation, on the social and economic level, between Turkey and Syria starting in the 2000s. This allowed families divided by the border to freely visit each other during the festive periods of Christmas and Eid. In December 2007, up to 27,000 people crossed the border to visit their brethren on the other side. In the wake of an agreement in the autumn of 2009 to lift visa requirements, nationals of both countries can travel freely. However, out of 50 agreements signed between Turkey and Syria in December 2009, the Hatay dispute stalled a water agreement over the Tigris and Euphrates Rivers. Turkey asked Syria to publicly recognise Hatay as a Turkish territory before signing on to the agreement.

Apart from maps showing Hatay as Syrian territory, the Syrian policy has been to avoid discussing Hatay and giving evasive answers when asked to specify Syrian future goals and ambitions with regard to the area. This has included a complete media silence on the issue. In February 2011, the dispute over Hatay was almost solved. The border separating Syria from Hatay was going to be blurred by a shared Friendship Dam on the Orontes river and as part of this project the two states had agreed on the national jurisdiction on each side of the border. Only weeks before the outbreak of the Syrian uprising and later war, groundbreaking ceremonies were held in Hatay and Idlib. As a result of the Syrian war and the extremely tense Turkish-Syrian relations it brought, construction was halted. As part of the ongoing war, the question of the sovereignty of Hatay has resurfaced in Syria and the Syrian media silence has been broken. Syrian media began broadcasting documentaries on the history of the area, the Turkish annexation and Turkification policies. Syrian newspapers have also reported on demonstrations in Hatay and on organizations and parties in Syria demanding an "end to the Turkish occupation". However, although the Syrian government has repeatedly criticized the Turkish policies towards Syria and the armed rebel groups operating on Syrian territory, it has not officially brought up the question of Hatay.

=== 2023 Turkey–Syria earthquakes ===
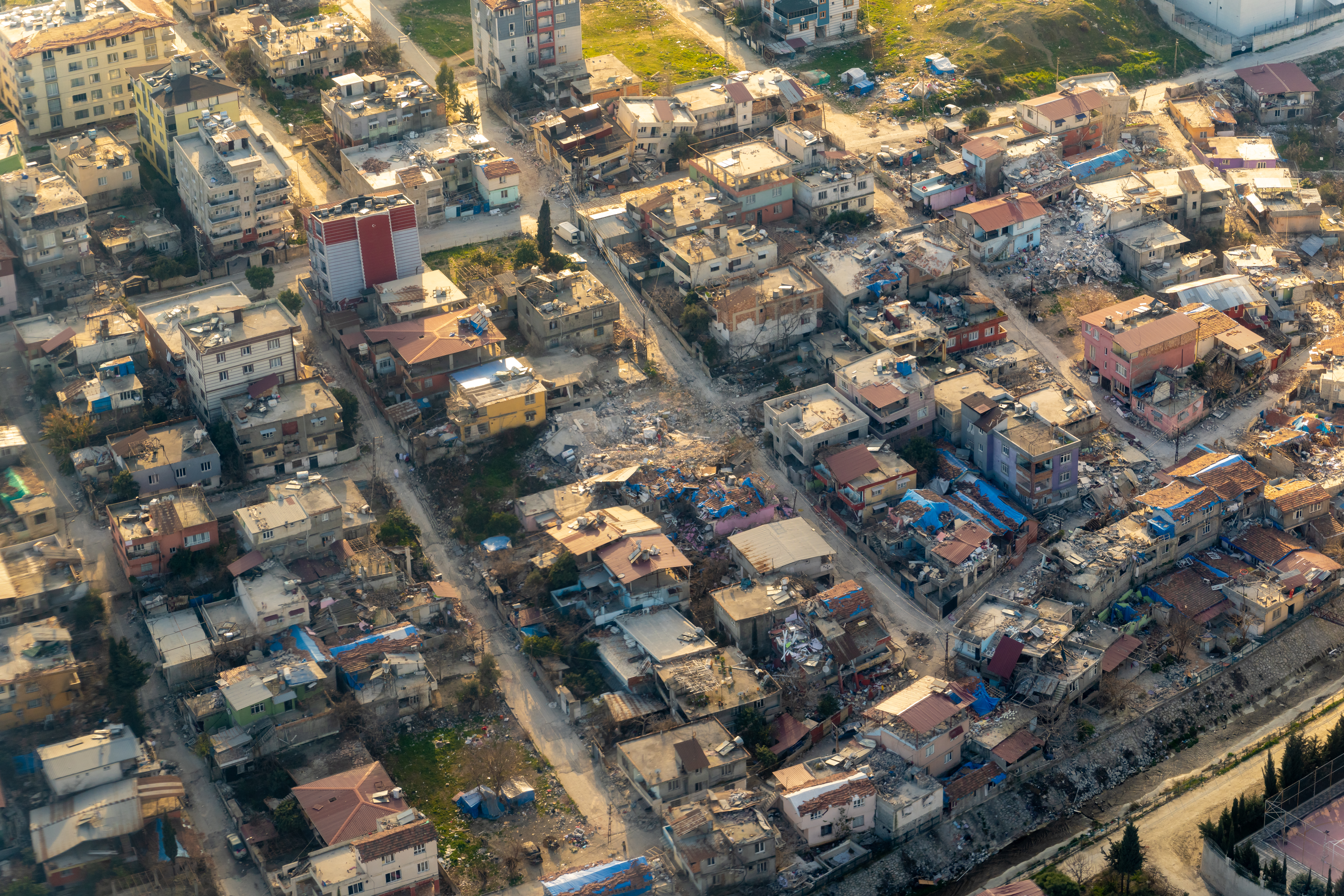
Earthquake damage in Hatay

Hatay Province was heavily damaged by the 2023 Turkey–Syria earthquakes. The province registered 23,065 earthquake-related fatalities and 30,762 injuries. More than 13,500 buildings collapsed, 67,346 were heavily damaged and 8,162 had to be demolished. The most affected areas were Antakya, Kırıkhan and İskenderun. Erzin was the only area that was not affected by the earthquake; not a single building collapsed.

== Geography ==
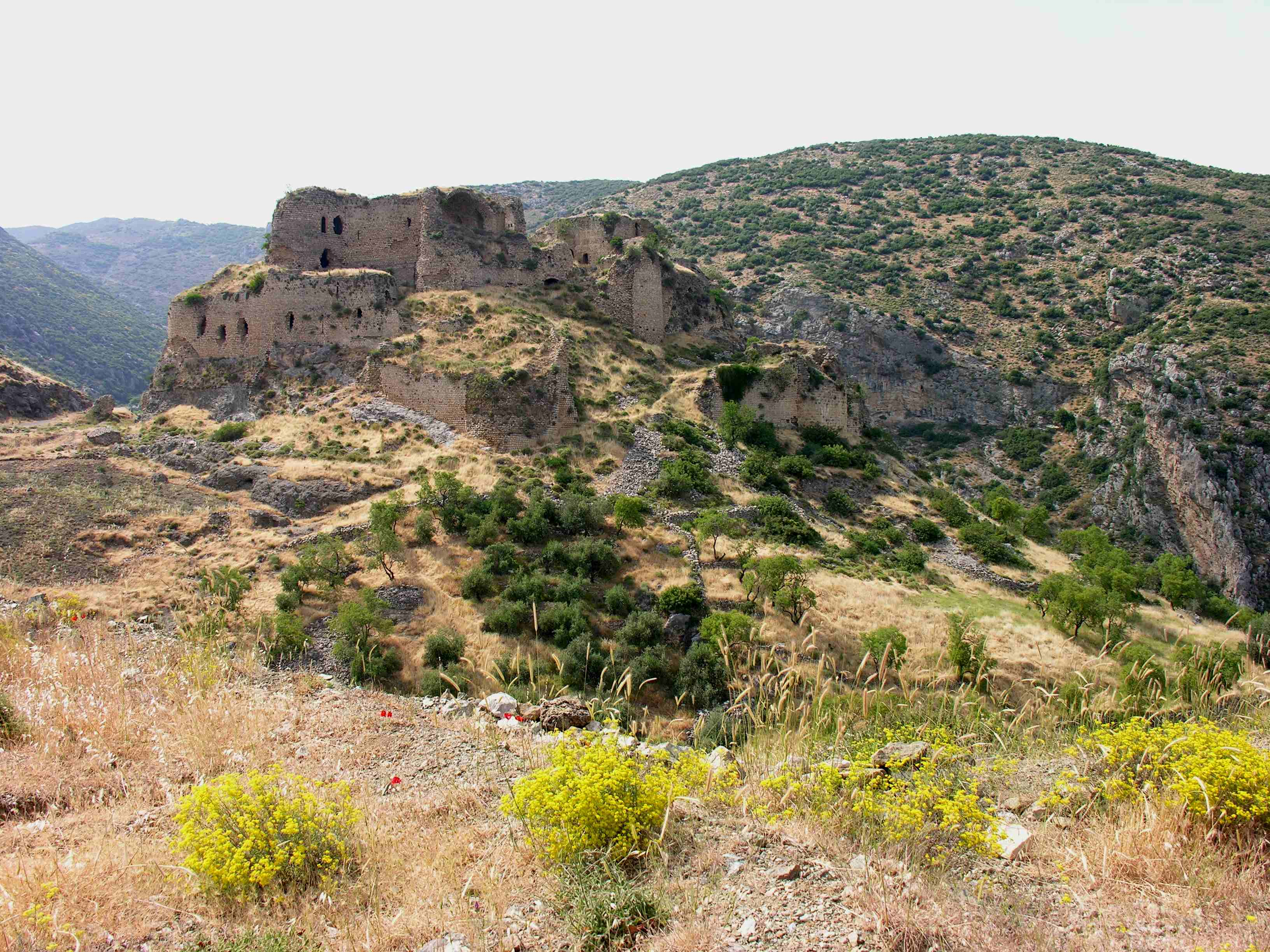
Castle ruins at Bağras in Hatay

Hatay is traversed by the north-easterly line of equal latitude and longitude. Of the land 46% is mountainous, 33% plains, and 20% plateau and hillside. The most prominent feature is the north–south leading Nur Mountains and the highest peak is Mığırtepe (2,240 m), while other peaks include Ziyaret dağı and Keldağ (Jebel Akra or Casius) at 1,739 m. The folds of land that make up the landscape of the province were formed as the land masses of Arabian-Nubian Shield and Anatolia have pushed into each other, meeting here in Hatay, a classic example of the Horst–graben formation. The Orontes River rises in the Bekaa Valley in Lebanon and runs through Syria and Hatay, where it receives the Karasu and the Afrin River. It flows into the Mediterranean at its delta in Samandağ. There was a lake in the plain of the Amik Valley, but it was drained in the 1970s and today Amik is the largest of the plains and an important agricultural center. The climate is typical of the Mediterranean, with warm wet winters and hot, dry summers. The mountain areas inland are drier than the coast. There are some mineral deposits: İskenderun is home to Turkey's largest iron and steel plant, and the district of Yayladağı produces a colourful marble called Rose of Hatay.

=== Climate ===
Köppen climate classification map of Hatay Province and surrounding regions of Turkey:
- Csa
- Csb
- Dsa
- Dsb

Hatay has a Mediterranean climate (Köppen: Csa) or a dry-summer humid subtropical climate (Trewartha: 'wet' Cs or Cf) which has hot, long and dry summers and mild, rainy winters.

Climate data for Hatay (1991–2020, extremes 1940–2020)
Month	Jan	Feb	Mar	Apr	May	Jun	Jul	Aug	Sep	Oct	Nov	Dec	Year
Record high °C (°F)	20.5 (68.9)	26.6 (79.9)	30.5 (86.9)	37.5 (99.5)	42.5 (108.5)	43.2 (109.8)	44.6 (112.3)	43.9 (111.0)	43.5 (110.3)	39.2 (102.6)	32.5 (90.5)	25.1 (77.2)	44.6 (112.3)
Mean daily maximum °C (°F)	12.5 (54.5)	14.9 (58.8)	19.0 (66.2)	23.0 (73.4)	27.0 (80.6)	29.7 (85.5)	31.6 (88.9)	32.5 (90.5)	31.4 (88.5)	28.2 (82.8)	20.3 (68.5)	13.9 (57.0)	23.7 (74.7)
Daily mean °C (°F)	8.2 (46.8)	9.9 (49.8)	13.6 (56.5)	17.4 (63.3)	21.6 (70.9)	25.1 (77.2)	27.6 (81.7)	28.3 (82.9)	26.1 (79.0)	21.5 (70.7)	14.3 (57.7)	9.5 (49.1)	18.6 (65.5)
Mean daily minimum °C (°F)	5.0 (41.0)	5.9 (42.6)	9.1 (48.4)	12.6 (54.7)	16.9 (62.4)	21.3 (70.3)	24.4 (75.9)	25.2 (77.4)	21.7 (71.1)	16.2 (61.2)	9.8 (49.6)	6.2 (43.2)	14.5 (58.1)
Record low °C (°F)	−11.8 (10.8)	−6.8 (19.8)	−4.2 (24.4)	1.5 (34.7)	7.7 (45.9)	11.6 (52.9)	15.9 (60.6)	15.4 (59.7)	7.9 (46.2)	2.3 (36.1)	−3.0 (26.6)	−6.6 (20.1)	−11.8 (10.8)
Average precipitation mm (inches)	179.5 (7.07)	162.0 (6.38)	145.1 (5.71)	108.4 (4.27)	89.8 (3.54)	20.3 (0.80)	8.1 (0.32)	5.4 (0.21)	61.7 (2.43)	56.0 (2.20)	99.2 (3.91)	188.7 (7.43)	1,124.2 (44.26)
Average precipitation days	13.57	12.07	11.20	9.73	5.67	1.83	0.80	0.80	4.33	7.70	8.03	11.40	87.1
Mean monthly sunshine hours	105.4	130.0	186.0	219.0	282.1	327.0	341.0	319.3	273.0	217.0	156.0	102.3	2,658.1
Mean daily sunshine hours	3.4	4.6	6.0	7.3	9.1	10.9	11.0	10.3	9.1	7.0	5.2	3.3	7.3
Source: Turkish State Meteorological Service

== Districts ==
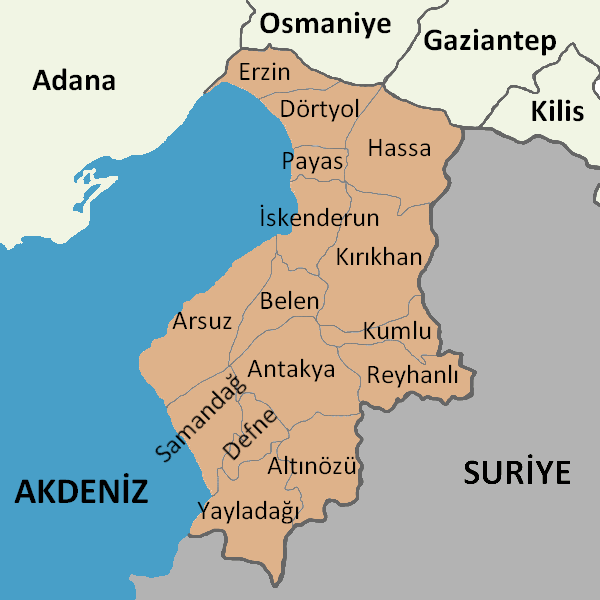
Districts of the Hatay Province

Hatay province is divided into 15 districts, listed below with their populations officially estimated as at 31 December 2022:

- Altınözü (60,344)
- Antakya (399,045)
- Arsuz (101,233)
- Belen (34,449)
- Defne (165,494)
- Dörtyol (128,941)
- Erzin (41,558)
- Hassa (56,675)
- İskenderun (251,682)
- Kırıkhan (121,028)
- Kumlu (13,333)
- Payas (43,919)
- Reyhanlı (108,092)
- Samandağ (123,447)
- Yayladağı (36,803)

== Demographics ==
Late 20th – early 21st century language distribution. • Turkish • Arabic speakers are shown by religious affiliation: Alawite (circle), Christian (triangle), Sunni (square), Bedouin Sunni (rectangle), Jewish (rhombus).

The majority of the population adheres to either Sunni Islam or Alawism, but other minorities are also present, including Syriac Orthodox, Syriac Catholic, Maronite, Antiochian Greek and Armenian communities. The village of Vakıflı in the district of Samandağ is Turkey's last remaining rural Armenian community. Arabs form the majority in three districts out of the twelve: Samandağ (Suwaidiyyah) (Alawi), Altınözü (Qusair) and Reyhanlı (Rihaniyyah) (Sunni). Unlike most Mediterranean provinces, Hatay has not experienced mass migration from other parts of Turkey in recent decades and has therefore preserved much of its traditional culture; for example, Arabic is still widely spoken in the province. To celebrate this cultural mix, in 2005 "Hatay Meeting of Civilisations" congress was organised by Aydın Bozkurt of Mustafa Kemal University and his "Hatay Association for the Protection of Universal Values".

During the Syrian Civil War, the province has experienced an influx of refugees. According to official figures, as of 21 April 2016, 408,000 Syrian refugees lived in the province.

=== Language ===
As of 2016, 85% of Arabic-heritage-speaking people in relevant parts of Hatay, specifically those who hear and may use the language on a daily basis, believed its use was decreasing; the rest disagree. The Arabic-speaking Antiochian Greek Christian minority has the right to teach Arabic under the Treaty of Lausanne; however, they tend to refrain from doing so to avoid sectarian tensions as the treaty does not apply to the Muslim majority.

=== Population ===
Historical population
Year	Pop.	±% p.a.
1940	246,138	—
1950	296,799	+1.89%
1960	441,209	+4.04%
1970	591,064	+2.97%
1980	856,271	+3.78%
1990	1,109,754	+2.63%
2000	1,253,726	+1.23%
2010	1,480,571	+1.68%
2020	1,659,320	+1.15%
2021	1,670,712	+0.69%
2022	1,686,043	+0.92%
Source:Turkstat

== Education ==
Mustafa Kemal University is one of Turkey's newer tertiary institutions, founded in İskenderun and Antakya in 1992.

İskenderun Technical University (ISTE), founded in 2015, is a technical university located in İskenderun.

== Transport ==
The province is served by Hatay Airport, as well as inter-city buses.

== Culture ==
=== Cuisine ===
Hatay is warm enough to grow tropical crops such as sweet potato and sugar cane, and these are used in the local cuisine, along with other local specialities including a type of cucumber/squash called kıtte. Well-known dishes of Hatay are its local variety of a widespread syrup-rich shredded pastry, künefe (kanafeh), squash cooked in onions and tomato paste (sıhılmahsi), aubergine and tahini paste (Baba ghanoush), chickpea and tahini paste hummus and dishes such as kebab found throughout Turkey. Particular spice mixes and herb mixes are popular. Pastes include:

- walnut and spice paste, muhammara
- thyme and parsley paste, Za'atar

Animal products include spicy köfte: oruk (i̇çli köfte); and a spicy sun-dried cheese, surke.

Pomegranate syrup (nar ekşisi) is Hatay's hallmark salad dressing.

=== Landmarks ===
- World's second-largest collection of Roman mosaics in the Hatay Archaeology Museum at Antakya.
- Habib-i Najjar Mosque, built on a former Pagan temple, where two saints are buried and visited by Muslims.
- Rock-carved Church of St Peter in Antakya, a site of Christian pilgrimage.
- Gündüz cinema, once parliament building of the Republic of Hatay.
- Titus Tunnel of Vespasian, in Samandağı, built as a water channel in the 2nd century.
- Castles: Koz Castle, Bakras Castle, Payas Castle, Mancınık Castle, Cin Castle, Darbısak Castle

=== Films ===
- Hatay is featured in the movie Indiana Jones and the Last Crusade, where it was portrayed as the final resting place of the Holy Grail in the fictitious "Canyon of the Crescent Moon" outside of Alexandretta. In the movie, set in 1938, the Nazis offer the Sultan of Hatay (a monarchy which the province never had in real life) precious valuables to compensate for removing the Grail from his borders. He ignores the valuables, but accepts their Rolls-Royce Phantom II.
- The Turkish film Propaganda (1999) by Sinan Çetin, portrays the difficult materialisation of the Turkish-Syrian border in 1948, cutting through villages and families.
- The 2001 film Şelale by local director Semir Aslanyürek was filmed in Hatay.

== Notable people ==
- Tayfur Sökmen — President of the Hatay State
- Cemil Meriç — writer, translator
- Barış Atay — actor, politician
- Can Atalay — lawyer, activist, politician
- Jehan Barbur — singer, songwriter
- Selami Şahin — musician, singer, songwriter
- Karsu — singer
- Kalben — musician
- Sadullah Ergin — Politician
- Eren Fansa — Footballer
- Gökhan Zan —Footballer, Politician

== See also ==
- Baku–Supsa Pipeline
- Baku–Tbilisi–Ceyhan pipeline
- Çukurova
- List of populated places in Hatay Province

== Notes ==
1. Map does not show all existing Hatay settlements and their linguistic composition. Arnold Werner states that his research only covered half of the Arabic speaking villages (some 50 out of a 100). Arabic and Turkish speaking villages shown on map are only those covered by Werner's research and map. The map excludes the northern more Turkish-speaking parts of the province.

== Bibliography ==
- Duiker, William J.; Spielvogel, Jackson J. (2012). World History. Cengage Learning. ISBN 978-1111831653.
- Khadduri, M. (July 1945). "The Alexandretta Dispute". The American Journal of International Law. 39 (3): 406–425. doi:10.2307/2193522. JSTOR 2193522. S2CID 155617277.
- Picard, Elizabeth (January 1982). "Retour au Sandjak". Maghreb-Machrek (in French). 99 (99). Paris: 47–64. doi:10.3917/machr1.099.0047.
