= Bakırköy Women's Prison =

Prison for women in Turkey

- Location within Istanbul
- Location: Bakırköy, Istanbul; 40°59′25″N 28°51′26″E
- Status: Operational
- Capacity: 912
- Population: 900 women, 56 children of age group 0–6 (as of March 2017)
- Opened: January 28, 2008; 18 years ago
- Managed by: Ministry of Justice

Notable prisoners
- Aslı Erdoğan; Nazlı Ilıcak; Zeynep Kuray; Esra Mungan; Deniz Seki; Seren Serengil; Ebru Şallı; Meşale Tolu; Suzan Zengin

Bakırköy Women's Prison (Turkish: Bakırköy Kadın Kapalı Ceza İnfaz Kurumu), or officially Bakırköy Women's Closed Penitentiary, is a state women's correctional institution in Istanbul, Turkey. It was established in 2008.

== Location ==
The prison was established by the Ministry of Justice on January 28, 2008. It is situated at Zuhuratbaba Mah., Dr. Tevfik Sağlam Cad. 28, next to the hospital for leprosy, skin illness and venereal diseases in Bakırköy district of Istanbul, Turkey. To the east 112 Emergency Control Center, to the east and south the Bakırköy Psychiatric Hospital and to the west the Sports Complex of Istanbul Metropolitan Municipality are located. Its distance to the Bakırköy Justice Palace is about 3 km (1.9 mi)

== Campus ==
Administration

The administrative building consists of four stories. On the ground floor, inmate reception, visiting rooms of prison physician and psychiatrist, personnel cafeteria, kitchen, laundry and photo lab, are found. The first floor contains personnel entrance, rooms for lawyers, visiting areas and office of the director-on-duty. Other administrative facilities such as the offices of the public prosecutor, the prison director and the staff manager, offices of the deputy director-in-charge, administrative officer, head warden and secretary, meeting hall, library, rooms for education, psychiatric service, computer system room, primary care infirmary, archive, canteen, hairdresser shop and tea shop are on the second floor. Other facilities such as diverse storage rooms, consignment room for the belongings of the prison inmates, censor room for inmate post, telephone center, central control room and room for technicians are situated on the third floor.

The total number of administrative personnel is 292, including 235 prison wardens and ten head wardens. About 200 of the personnel are female.

Prison

The correctional institution is capable of hosting in total 912 female prisoners and detainees, as well as juveniles. As of March 2017, the population was 900 women including some foreigners and 56 children of inmates in the age group 0–6.

The building consists of three blocks. Each block contains cells or living quarters in different size reserved for detainees only or prisoners of same age groups. In addition to 41 cells for single inmates, there are wards, also called pods, for 2, 6, 12 and 24 inmates. Other facilities in the prison building are a primary care infirmary with five beds, three rooms for family reunion and five visiting rooms with audiovisual features used also for teleconference between a court room and a defendant, who does not leave the prison.

== Security ==
Outer security

The prison facilities cover an area of 34,478 m^{2} (371,120 sq ft). It is surrounded by thick and high walls, which are topped with 1 m (3 ft 3 in)-high barbed wire, razor wire in two rows and motion sensors. In addition, razor wire is installed on the edges of the prison buildings's roof. Outside of the surrounding walls of the prison, guard boxes are placed. A deep physical barrier is built in the form of a diaphragm wall underground in the yard between the prison building walls and the surrounding walls.

Inner security

Inner security of the correctional institution is provided by prison wardens and head officials, who work in four shifts. Prisoner and goods gates are separate. Official counts of the inmates are conducted twice a day under the supervision of the deputy director-on-duty. The exercise yards are opened at 7:00 hours in the morning, and closed depending on the weather conditions. Visitors of the inmates are let in through a door with full body scanner, and are checked in detail for restricted presents.

The prison administration conducts general or individual searches, also called shakedowns, of the inmates or the living areas for contraband as a normal part of prison life in intervals not exceeding 30 days. These can be routine or random. A general search is carried out with participation of the public prosecutor and the commander of the local gendarmerie.

All outgoing and incoming mail, telegraphs and faxes are read by a censor commission, and incoming books, periodicals and printed publications are examined by the education unit.

For security lighting purposes, 45 floodlight projectors at the guard towers and 15 projectors on the surrounding walls are installed. Inside and outside areas of the faculty are monitored by video surveillance. Footage is saved in the central control room.

== Daily life ==
The hour between 7:00 and 8:00 is the inmates' wake-up, personal care and breakfast time. After the inmates count, convicts and detainees are prepared until 9:00 hours to go to the primary care unit, hospital or court. The prison offers treatment for the inmates by in-house dentist, gynaecologist, psychiatrist and family physician. Inmates can join social activities before and after the lunch, can read newspapers, books, watch television and play chess etc. Bedtime is at 23:00 hours.

An investigation by journalist Nadiye Gürbüz raised concerns about poor conditions at the prison, including severe overcrowding.

== Gender identity issues ==
An African-American screenwriter woman, Maisha Yearwood, who identified herself as butch lesbian, was detained in 2009 after her arrest at the airport for drug possession. Before her reception into the prison, the facility doctor questioned her to determine her sex, which was not clear due to her appearance. She was later sent to a hospital for a gynaecological examination. She had to spend her time in solitary confinement.

In 2015, a trans woman claimed that she was subject to forced search and harassment by law enforcement officers during her visit to the prison. An LGBT activist, who went to the prison the same year to visit an inmate, reported that she was denied a body search in the security line for females and was directed to a check by male guards because of her trans women identity. She refused the search, and was harassed after she argued with the male guard.

== Prison riot attempt ==
A prison riot attempt occurred on August 1, 2016, orchestrated by a group of inmates affiliated with the illegal Revolutionary People's Liberation Party/Front (DHKP-C). The convicts set some of the pods on fire, and damaged them. Following the investigation by the public prosecutor, the prison doctor, the medical assistant and two female guards were arrested for leading to a chaos, misconduct and instigation.

== Notable inmates ==
- Aslı Erdoğan (born 1967), novelist, detained on accusation of membership in the advisory board of a newspaper, which allegedly makes propaganda for an illegal organization.
- Nazlı Ilıcak (born 1944), journalist, detained on accusation on membership in an illegal organization.
- Sedef Kabaş (born 1968), journalist, detained on accusation of insulting the president.
- Zeynep Kuray (born 1978), journalist, convicted of spreading propaganda for an illegal organization.
- Esra Mungan, academic, detained on accusation of spreading propaganda for an illegal organization.
- Deniz Seki (born 1970), pop-singer, convicted of drug trafficking.
- Seren Serengil (born 1971), singer and actress, convicted of repeated defamation.
- Ebru Şallı (born 1977), model and actress, detained on accusation of drug offences.
- Meşale Tolu (born 1984), German journalist and translator of Turkish origin, detained on accusations of spreading propaganda for an illegal organization and membership of the organization,
- Suzan Zengin (1959–2011), journalist and translator, detained on accusation of membership of an illegal organization.

== See also ==
- List of women's prisons in Turkey
