= Zengin =

Zengin (Zengîn) is a Kurdish and Turkish first or a surname. In Kurdish it is mostly the first name, while in Turkish it is more common to be a surname. Other variations of it are Zangin and Zangîn. Notable people with the surname include:

- Erkan Zengin, Swedish footballer of Turkish descent
- İbrahim Zengin, Turkish wrestler
- Kerim Zengin, Turkish footballer
- Muhammet Oǧuz Zengin, Turkish curler
- Suzan Zengin (1959 – 2011), Turkish journalist, translator and human rights activist
- Tolga Zengin, Turkish footballer
- Zengin (banking), the payment clearing network used by Japanese banks (akin the automated clearing house system used in the United States)
