= Amed S.F.K. =

Association football club in Turkey

- Full name: Amed Sportif Faaliyetler Kulübü
- Founded: 1972; 53 years ago (Note: It got its current name in 2015)
- Ground: Diyarbakır Stadium
- Capacity: 33,000
- Coordinates: 37°56′33″N 40°07′13″E
- Chairman: Nahit Eren
- Head coach: Besnik Hasi
- League: Süper Lig
- 2025–26: TFF 1. Lig, 2nd of 20 (promoted)
- Website: www.amedspor.com.tr
| Home colours | Away colours | Third colours |

Amed Sportif Faaliyetler Kulübü (Kurmanji Kurdish: Klûba Çalakiyên Sporê ya Amedê, 'Amed Sports Activities Club'), commonly known as Amedspor (Note: also known as simply Amed), is a sports club based in Diyarbakır, Turkey. The club is widely supported by Kurds in Turkey and abroad for its embrace of Kurdish identity. Its football section plays in the Süper Lig in the 2026–27 season after having been promoted from the TFF 1. Lig in 2025–26.

The club also has a women's team and a women's volleyball team.

== Name ==
The club's name is derived from the Kurdish name for its home city of Diyarbakır – Amed – a historical and culturally significant designation used widely by the Kurdish community, and which the club adopted when it changed its name in 2014 to reflect this local identity.

== History ==
The club was established in 1972 and competed in the amateur leagues for many years as Melikahmet Turanspor, because of a sponsorship with Turan Gazozlar. The club colours were red and white. In 1985 the club name changed into Melikahmetspor after the naming rights/sponsorship had ended.

The Diyarbakır municipality bought the club in 1990 and changed its name to Diyarbakır Belediyespor (English: Diyarbakır Municipality Sports Club). In 1993 the club changed its name into Diyarbakır Büyükşehir Belediyespor (English: Diyarbakır Metropolitan Municipality Sports Club), after the city became a metropolitan municipality.

In the 1993–94 season, the club won the Super Amateur League and was promoted to the TFF 3. League, marking the club’s entry into Turkey’s professional football leagues.

In 1999, Mayor Feridun Çelik of the pro-Kurdish Democratic People’s Party (DEHAP) oversaw a name change for the club to Diyarbakır Büyükşehir Belediyesi DİSKİspor (English: Diyarbakır Metropolitan Municipality Diskispor). The change was intended to generate revenue through sponsorship from the Diyarbakır Metropolitan Municipality's Water and Sewerage Administration (DİSKİ).

At the beginning of the 2010–11 season the club's general assembly decided to alter the name once again into Diyarbakır Büyükşehir Belediyespor.

In the 2012–2013 season the club was promoted to the TFF 2. League, Turkey's third tier of professional football, in which they remained for the next 11 years.

In October 2014, shortly after the club officially changed its name to Amedspor, the Turkish Football Federation (TFF) imposed a fine on the club, citing that the name change had been made "without official approval." The objection of the TFF was because of the existence of another club named Amedspor, which later on changed its name into Amidaspor. However, in the club's final name change to Amed Sportif Faaliyetler Kulübü (English: Amed Sports Activities Club), the TFF announced that it would accept this new name. The club’s adoption of the Kurdish name for the city of Diyarbakır, Amed, led to increased support among Kurds, while also drawing racist attacks from Turkish nationalists and problems with Turkish authorities.

In the 2015–16 season, the club reached the quarterfinals of the Turkish Cup for the first time. In the first leg of the quarterfinal, Amedspor hosted Fenerbahçe.

Amedspor became the champions of the 2023–24 TFF 2. League Red Group and were promoted to the TFF 1. League, the second tier of Turkish football, for the 2024–25 season.

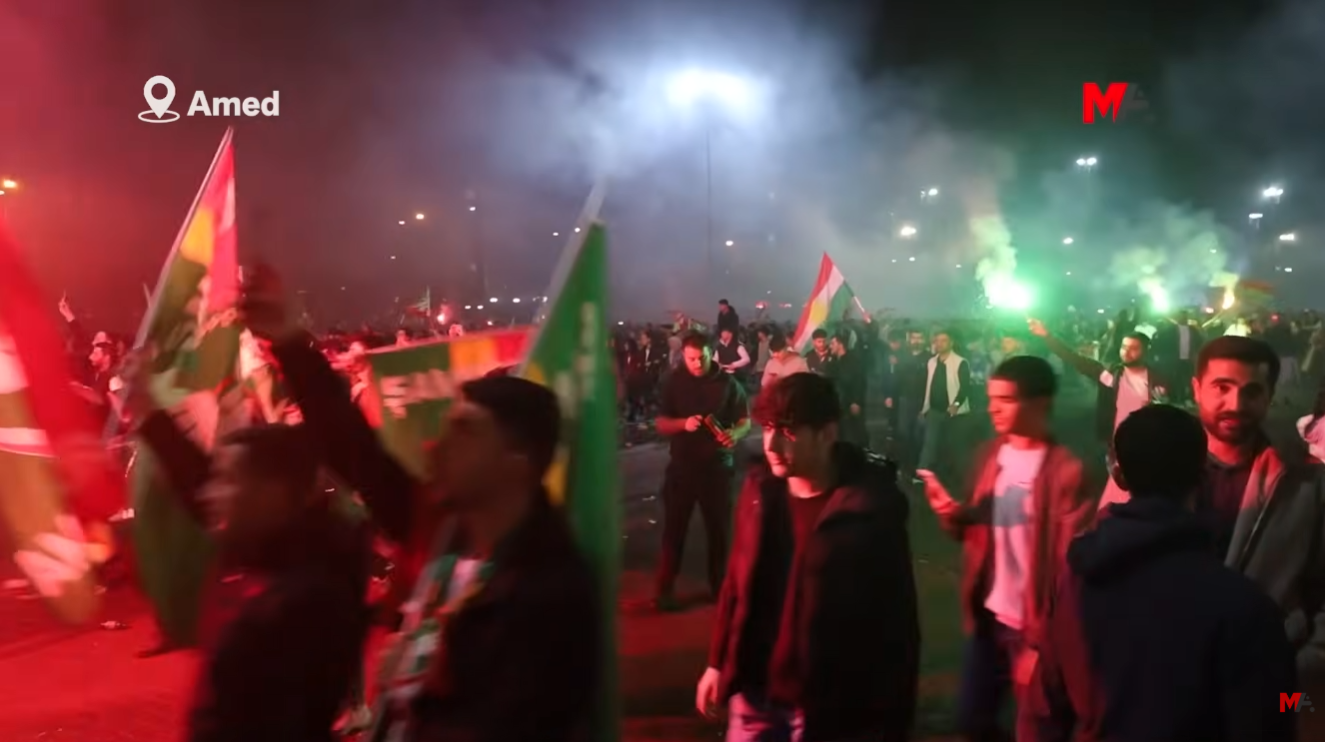
Celebrations of promotion to the Süper Lig featuring the Kurdistan flag.

During the 2025–26 TFF 1. League, Amedspor finished second and were promoted for the first time in the club's history to the Süper Lig, the highest level of football in Turkey. The promotion was widely celebrated not only in Diyarbakır but also in major Turkish cities with significant Kurdish populations, including Istanbul, Ankara, Mersin, and Adana, as well as across Kurdish-majority regions in southeastern Turkey, including Van, Şırnak, Batman, Mardin, Muş, Bitlis, Urfa, Siirt, Tunceli, Yüksekova, and Ağrı. Several politicians congratulated the club on its promotion, including Turkish President Recep Tayyip Erdoğan, the President of the Kurdistan Region Nechirvan Barzani, and members of the DEM party.

== Identity ==
As a club based in one of the largest cities in the predominantly Kurdish southeast of Turkey (Turkish Kurdistan), Amedspor openly embraces a Kurdish identity. In 2015, former club president İhsan Avcı stated that Amedspor viewed itself as "a team of Kurdistan," noting that approximately 80 percent of the squad at the time consisted of Kurdish players and that Kurdish footballers from all leagues had been invited to join the club. Football commentator and sports writer Ali Fikri Işık compared the relationship between Amedspor and its Kurdish fans to the bond between Catalans and FC Barcelona in Spain. Işık further states that Amedspor represents a nation, "thus, the success of Amedspor resonates as a triumph for all Kurds," while other commentators describe Amedspor as becoming "an unofficial Kurdish national team."

Amedspor’s leadership emphasizes democratic and participatory principles, including women’s participation at all levels. In this context, human rights lawyer Metin stated that "Amedspor is a novel (in Turkish football)."

Amedspor understands itself as a "team of the others," referring to groups that have historically faced discrimination in Turkey, including Kurds as well as LGBTQ people, Black communities, and Armenians.

=== Crest ===
When the club changed its name in 2014, it also adopted a new crest featuring a double-headed eagle, a figure found on the ancient city walls of Diyarbakır.

=== Colours ===
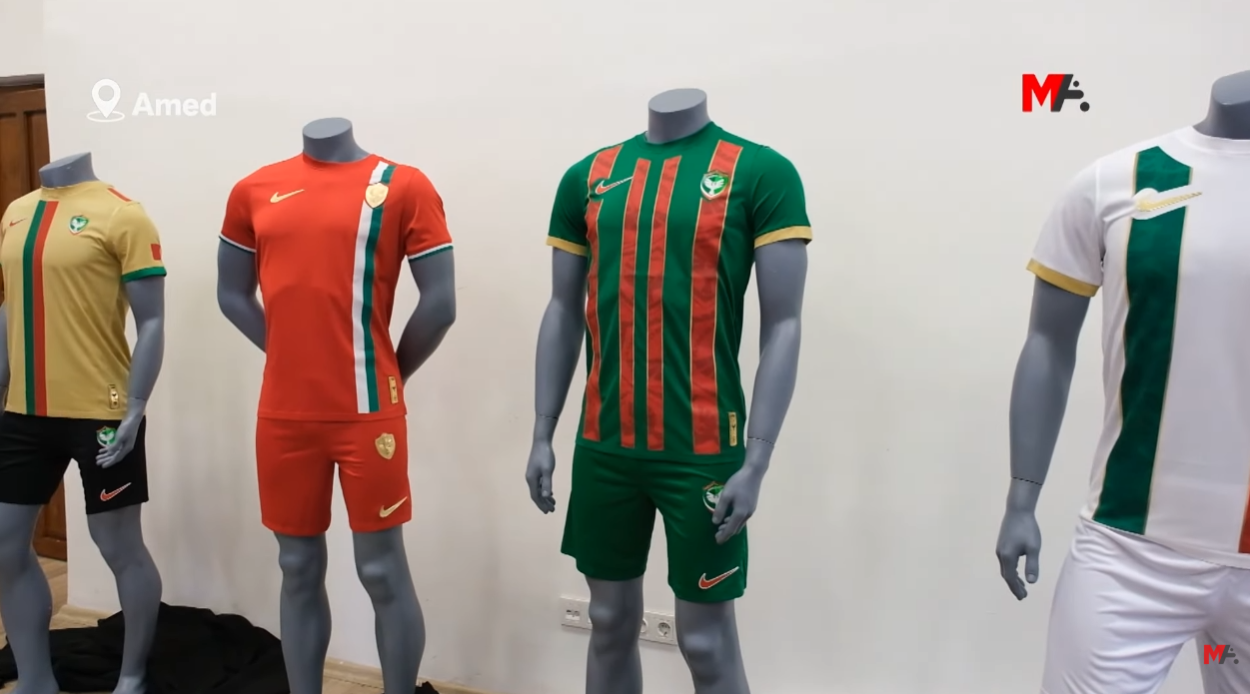
Amedspor's jerseys in Kurdish cultural colors for the 2025–2026 TFF 1. League season.

The club's jerseys typically feature colors associated with the Kurdistan flag, such as red, white, and green. The club also attempted to use green-red-yellow, but it was prohibited on several occasions due to political challenges.

| Season | Manufacture | Kit Colours |
|---|---|---|
| –2013 | Umbro | Red-Green |
| 2013–2016 | Lotto | Red-Green, White, Black |
| 2016–2017 | Nike | White, Red, Black |
| 2018–2019 | Nike | Red-Green, White, Green, Red |
| 2021–2022 | Nike | Red-Green, White, Black |
| 2022–2023 | Nike | Red, Black-Gold, White-Red |

=== Fan chants ===
Amedspor fans sing the "Diren Ha Diyarbakir (Amed)" song during a match.

After victories, Amedspor players and supporters often sing the song "Diren Ha Diyarbakır" ("Resist Diyarbakır") together, which has become the club’s unofficial anthem.

A popular chant among the club's supporters is "Amed! Amed!".

In games, fans chanted in Kurdish "Her der Sur, her der berxwedan" (English: Everywhere is Sur, everywhere is resistance) in reference to Diyarbakır's historic walled quarter, which faced curfews and military operations following the 2014 Kobanî protests and the collapse of the 2013–2015 PKK–Turkey peace process. Similar chants in Kurdish, criticizing Turkish military actions, used by fans include "Children should not die, they should come to our matches" and "Berxwedan Amed, Berxwedan Diyarbakır" ("Resist Amed, Resist Diyarbakır").

Fans chant the slogan "Kîne em? Kurd in em!" ("Who are we? We are Kurds!") in unison. The chant originates from a poem by the influential Kurdish cultural figure Cigerxwîn.

During their 2024–25 TFF First League fixture against fellow Kurdish club Vanspor F.K., with which they maintain a friendly relationship, fans of both teams chanted the Kurdish slogan "Kîne em? Kurd in em!" ("Who are we? We are Kurds!").

During their 2024–25 TFF First League match against Gençlerbirliği supporters chanted "Jin, Jiyan, Azadî" ("Women, Life, Freedom"). The slogan was also chanted during matches of Amedspor's women team.

Other chants include: "What gives you life is resisting"; "Stop and listen this song is for you", "Trust the love of the mountains (mountains is sometimes substituted with "fans")."

The fan group Amedspor Barikat also have their own rendition of "Bella Ciao," the old Italian anti-fascist partisan song.

=== Tifos ===
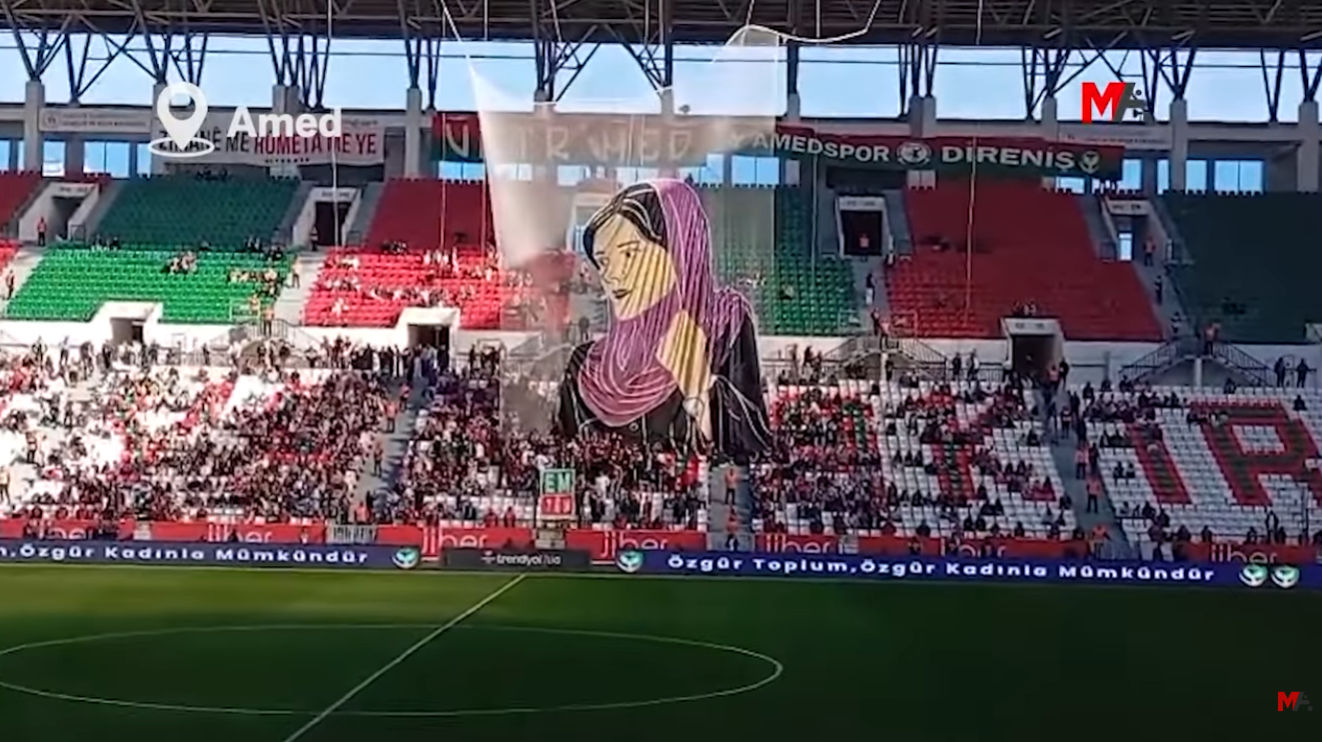
Tifo dedicated to Jina Amini, regarded by many Kurds as a symbol of resistance.

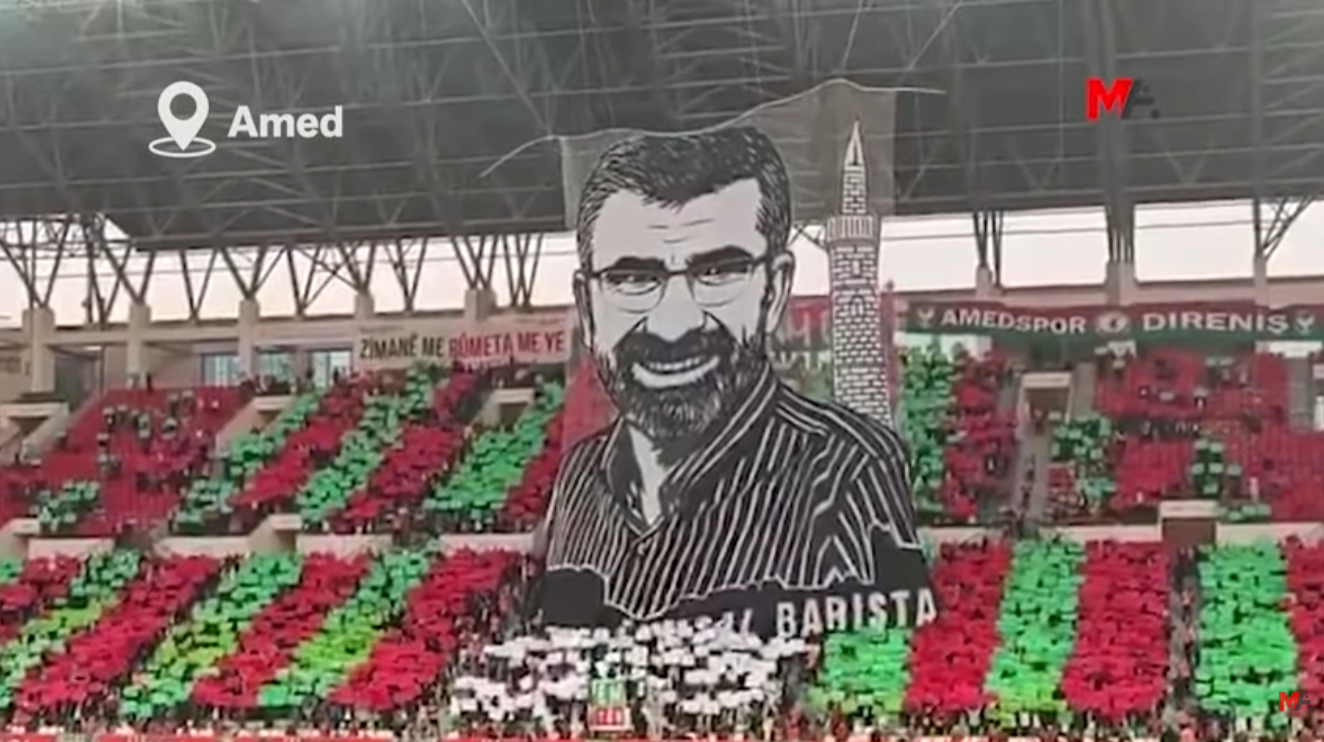
Tifo dedicated to Tahir Elçi, with the Kurdish slogan "Zimanê me rûmeta me ye" ("Our language is our honor") featured in the background.

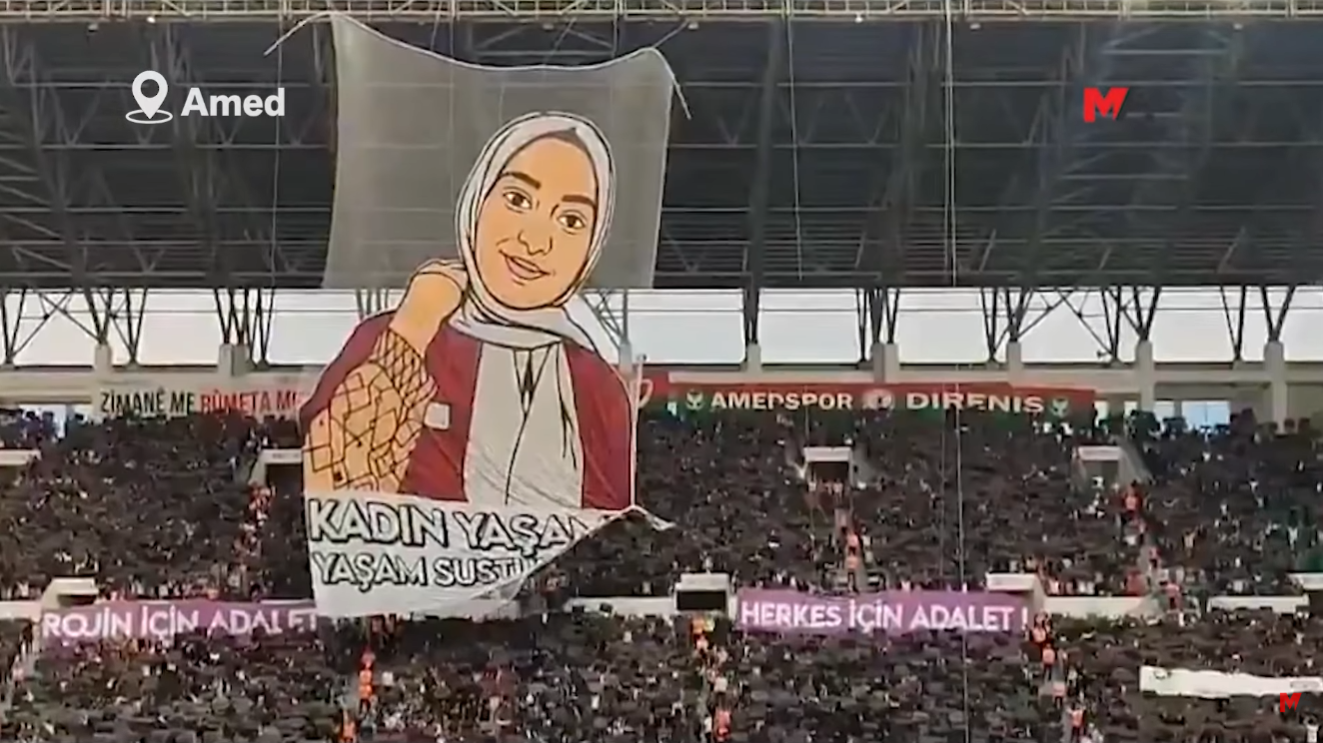
Tifo dedicated to Rojin Kabaiş.

== Supporters, rivalries and controversies ==
=== Supporters ===
==== Domestic support ====
The club is the most popular among Kurds in Turkey and the most widely supported football club in Diyarbakır. In January 2024, the Diyarbakır-based Kurdish Studies Center estimated that Amedspor has more than 250,000 supporters in Diyarbakır and over 1 million supporters across Turkey. While competing in the TFF 2. League in 2023, the club averaged 20,000 spectators per match–more than 17 of the 20 teams in the one-tier higher TFF 1. League managed to attract.

Following the club's promotion to the TFF 1. League, Amedspor president Aziz Elaldı stated that children in the Kurdish regions were increasingly supporting Amedspor rather than major Turkish clubs such as Galatasaray or Fenerbahçe.

==== Fan groups ====
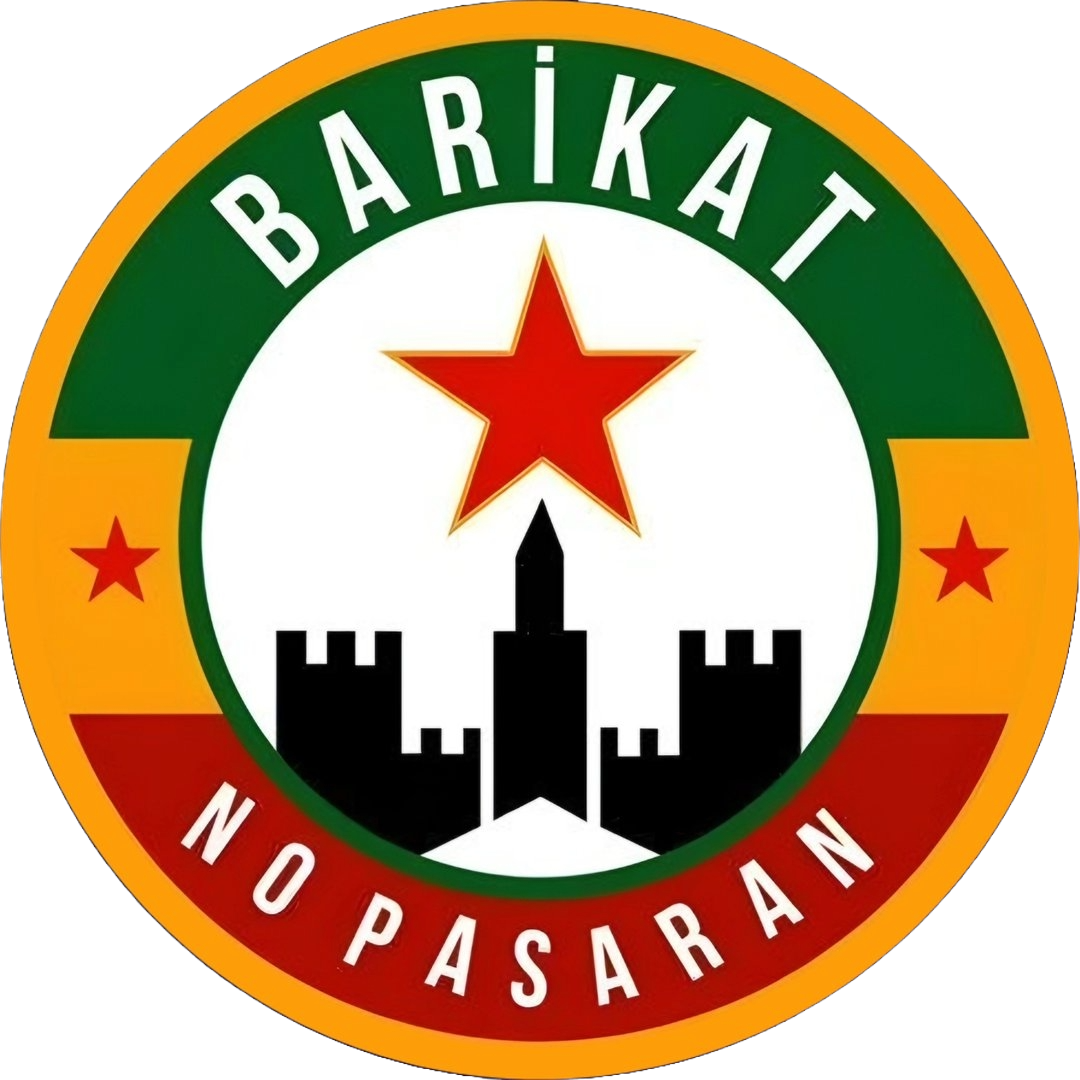
Logo of the Amedspor Barikat fan group.

The most important supporter group is Amedspor Barikat ("Amedspor Barricade"). It was founded in late 2014 and describes itself as an anti-fascist, patriotic fan group of Amedspor that opposes racist and sexist views. They are known for their pro-Kurdish chants. During a match against İstanbul Başakşehir F.K. at the Başakşehir Fatih Terim Stadium, approximately 30 persons of the fan group were detained for chanting slogans such as "Everywhere is Sur, everywhere is resistance," and "Children shouldn't die, they should be able to go to the match." Mor Barikat ("Purple Barricade") is the parallel women’s fan group. Both supporter groups emphasize Kurdish women’s rights and equal participation, a practice more common in Kurdish culture than in many neighboring Muslim societies. They have also worked to create a safe and welcoming environment for women fans. Barikat's logo features the anti-fascist phrase "No pasaran," a reference to the defense of Madrid against Francisco Franco's fascist forces during the Spanish Civil War.

Another supporter group is known as Direniş ("Resistance"). The name Direniş was eventually approved for the group by the TFF, after approximately twenty previous applications had been rejected. Tîma Gel ("People's Team") is also a popular fan group of Amedspor.

==== International support ====
The supporter group Amedspor Barikat says that it has received international visitors and support from fans in Cyprus and Galicia.

The Hamburg-based club FC St. Pauli expressed solidarity with its former player, Amedspor midfielder Deniz Naki, who had been banned for life by Turkish authorities. Fan groups of Amedspor have reportedly built connections with the fan scene of FC St. Pauli.

On 8 November 2023, during a UEFA Champions League match between Bayern Munich and Galatasaray, members of Bayern’s Schickeria München fan group displayed a banner reading "Lift Amedspor’s Away Bans!" Amedspor expressed its gratitude for the show of solidarity in a statement on its X account.

During the 2025–26 promotion campaign to the Süper Lig, some supporters from outside Turkey, particularly Kurds from the Kurdistan Region of Iraq, attended matches to support the club.

=== Rivalries and controversies ===
==== Conflict with authorities ====
Clubs from the Kurdish city of Diyarbakır had previously faced racist abuse and other difficulties when playing, and these incidents reportedly increased for Amedspor following the club's name change.

According to an interview with the German newspaper Die Zeit, the club stated that it faced difficulties due to being perceived by the TFF and Turkish authorities as a symbol of Kurdish nationalist identity. Turkish authorities have banned the display of the Kurdistan flag in stadiums, and in December 2015 Amedspor supporters were prohibited from attending away matches for a period of time. Following the ban, supporters attempted to attend matches without displaying club colors but were on several occasions forced to leave early after celebrating goals and clashing with opposing supporters and police.

Merchandise belonging to Amedspor supporters has also been regularly seized by police, and supporters have been prohibited from displaying banners in the Kurdish language. During away matches, the team has reportedly been denied hotel accommodations. In addition, some stadium announcers have refused to pronounce the club’s Kurdish name. Some Amedspor supporters have reportedly been detaiend by the Turkish police for not standing during the Turkish national anthem at matches.

In January 2016, Turkish police searched the Amedspor club premises and confiscated computers.

From 2016 to 2020, Amedspor supporters were banned from attending 70 away matches involving the club’s men’s football team.

Fans of the Amed S.K. women's team were not allowed to watch away games from 2018 to February 2019.

After the Diyarbakır Metropolitan Municipality was taken over by a government-appointed trustee in November 2016, replacing the imprisoned pro-Kurdish elected officials, the trustee requested that Amedspor change its name and include government-appointed municipal officials on its board in order to continue receiving municipal funding. The club rejected both demands in early 2017. Subsequently municipal funding has been cut off on multiple occasions.

In March 2018, the Turkish Ministry of the Interior sent three inspectors to Amedspor for a thorough investigation, although the reason for the inquiry was not disclosed to the club’s board.

In January 2026, the Turkish Football Federation issued a fine of 802,500 lira ($18,500) on Amedspor and suspended its president, Nahit Eren, from football-related activities for 15 days for "damaging the reputation of football" by "making ideological propaganda", after the club uploaded a video of a woman having her hair braided amid similar acts by Kurds in solidarity with their compatriots in Syria during the 2026 northeastern Syria offensive. In connection with this, on 1 February, during a match against Adana Demirspor, player Cekdar Orhan celebrated a goal by braiding his hair in a similar gesture, which resulted in a fine of 600,000 lira.

==== Controversies in the 2015–2016 Turkish Cup quarterfinal ====
In early 2016, Amedspor pulled off an upset win over Bursaspor to make it into quarterfinals of the Turkish Cup. Following this victory, Amedspor supporters were banned by the TFF from attending the subsequent match against Fenerbahçe S.K. for "ideological propaganda," after fans reportedly chanted slogans such as "Everywhere is resistance" and "Children should not die, they should come to our matches," in reference to Turkish military operations in Kurdish cities during 2015–2016, which resulted in numerous civilian casualties.

Additionally, shortly after proceeding to the quarterfinals, Amedspor midfielder Deniz Naki (with Bundesliga and Süper Lig experience, who was among the best players of the division) was fined 273,000 Turkish Liras (65,000 USD) and suspended for 12 games by the TFF after dedicating the club’s victory against Ankaragücü to civilians killed in the Kurdish–Turkish conflict in a Twitter post, which the federation described as "ideologically supporting the PKK (Kurdistan Workers' Party)" and engaging in unsportsmanlike conduct. Naki's Tweet, which led to the ban read:

“As Amedspor, we have not bowed our heads and never will… We dedicate this victory to those who have been killed and injured under oppression in our country for over 50 days.”

The Turkish police also raided the club's offices, taking their computers on suspicion that the Tweet might possibly have originated from there. Naki's suspension was later extended into a lifetime ban in January 2018, in addition to terrorism-related charges by a Turkish court, when he spoke out against the Turkish invasion of Afrin and called for participation in demonstrations against it.

The TFF has applied “ideological propaganda” penalties exclusively against Kurdish clubs. Apart from Amedspor, other clubs that have received such penalties include Dersimspor, Vanspor, Cizrespor, Diyarbekirspor, and other football clubs run by municipalities affiliated with Kurdish political parties.

Then, in the Turkish Cup quarterfinal against Fenerbahçe S.K., which Amedspor initially drew 3–3 before losing in extra time, fans were not allowed to attend the match. Supporters gathered outside were dispersed with water cannons by riot police, while military jets reportedly flew over the stadium.

==== Controversies against Sakaryaspor ====
On matchday 24 of the 2018–19 TFF Second League season, during a 1–1 draw between Amedspor and Sakaryaspor, a brawl broke out, with Amedspor midfielder Mansur Calar accused of attacking opposing players with a sharp object. It is unclear whether the injuries of Sakaryaspor players, shared on social media, were caused by a razor or by nail scratches sustained during the brawl. Although the Disciplinary Committee of the TFF punished Çalar for his "extremely gross unsportsmanlike conduct" with a four-year ban, the Arbitration Board of the TFF reduced his suspension to 20 games and fined him with 25.000 TL. Other players from both teams received suspensions and fines and Amedspor was also ordered to play one match behind closed doors.

==== Controversies against Bursaspor ====
Amedspor's victory over Bursaspor in the 2016 Turkish Cup, played in front of Bursaspor's ultra-nationalist Turkish supporters, marked the beginning of a rivalry between the two clubs.

Encounters between Amedspor and Bursaspor during the 2022–23 TFF Second League White Group season were marked by tension. In September 2022, the visiting Amedspor team arrived and departed the stadium in armored vehicles. The night before the match, a mob gathered outside the hotel in Bursa where Amedspor was staying. They reportedly played the Mehter March, an Ottoman military anthem, and shouted slogans such as "How happy is the one who says I am a Turk." The mob also set off fireworks aimed at the hotel. On matchday, clashes broke out between Amedspor and Bursaspor supporters in the stadium, the pitch was invaded, and a knife was reportedly thrown at Amedspor’s goalkeeper. Kurdish flags were displayed in the stands, and confrontations between home supporters and police occurred outside the stadium as tensions escalated.

Before the return match on 5 March 2023, Amedspor players were reportedly attacked, as Bursaspor fans threw plastic water bottles, firecrackers, and knives on the field, while some Bursaspor fans displayed banners depicting Mahmut Yıldırım, a Turkish rogue agent of the Turkish counter-guerrilla JİTEM, linked to unresolved murders, alongside images of a Renault Toros, symbolizing forced disappearances and political killings of Kurds in Turkey during the 1990s. Furthermore Bursaspor fans entered Amedspor's locker room where they assaulted goalkeeper Cantuğ Temel, player Anıl Şahin, and club manager Ömer Elaldı. The TFF subsequently sanctioned Bursaspor with six matches plus one behind closed doors without fans, and club officials were banned from football activities for 90 days.

Kurdish news channels described the attacks as an "organized lynching attack" on Amedspor. In its official statement, the pro-Kurdish Peoples’ Equality and Democracy Party (DEM Party) said:

“We condemn the racist attacks in Bursa against Amedspor. The atmosphere that revives the spirits of the murderers of the 1990s and the remnants of JİTEM will not stop Amedspor nor end the hope for peace. Those responsible must be held accountable before the law. We are millions standing together against fascism.”

In its complaint regarding the incident, the Diyarbakır Bar Association stated that the acts constituted crimes of inciting or humiliating the public to hatred and hostility, intentionally endangering public safety, and insulting or abusing public office.

Tensions continued in May 2023 when Ümit Özdağ, leader of the ultranationalist Victory Party, stated in a speech to supporters in Bursa that he would not allow a team named Amedspor to reach the top divisions of Turkish football.

In December 2025, supporters of Bursaspor, then relegated to the TFF 2. League, directed sexist and racist chants at Leyla Zana, a prominent Kurdish female politician. In response, Amedspor announced that its match against Iğdır F.K. on 28 December would be free for women, describing the decision as a way to counter the attacks by increasing women’s presence in the stands.

==== Discrimination against Kurdish-language jerseys ====
In October 2025, Amedspor was fined by the TFF for featuring a Kurdish-language slogan on its official jerseys. The club’s kit displayed the phrase “Koma me bona we” (English: “Our group is for you”), a slogan related to a local sponsor’s advertising campaign. Although the club stated that the sponsorship design had been formally approved by the federation before the season began, the Professional Football Disciplinary Board (PFDK) fined Amedspor 110,000 TL, citing a breach of “equipment regulations.”

A few weeks later, the PFDK issued another 110,000 TL fine for the same slogan appearing during a subsequent league match, bringing the total amount to 220,000 TL.

In response, Amedspor’s management argued that the decision was discriminatory, emphasizing that the Kurdish slogan carried no political meaning and that its Turkish equivalent had previously appeared on other clubs’ jerseys without sanction. Club president Aziz Elaldı stated that the ruling represented a “double standard” and an “implicit ban on the Kurdish language in sports.”

The incident provoked a strong public reaction. The pro-Kurdish DEM Party condemned the fines as “another example of institutional discrimination against Kurdish identity,” and called on the federation to reverse its decision. Several human rights organizations and local bar associations also criticized the sanctions, arguing that they restricted linguistic diversity and freedom of expression in Turkish sports.

The TFF, however, maintained that the fines were not related to the language of the slogan but rather to “technical violations” of sponsorship and equipment regulations.

==== Signing of Israeli player Dia Saba ====
The transfer of Dia Saba in August 2025 to Amedspor for a reported fee of $3 million drew criticism in Turkey over the Israeli international's past social media activity during the Israel–Gaza conflict. Saba, an Israeli national of Arab origin with 13 appearances for Israel's national team, was publicly defended by Amedspor and the supporter group Tîma Gel, and was warmly received by supporters upon his arrival at Diyarbakır Airport.

==== Other incidents ====
In April 2016, after a win against Ankaragücü, Amedspor's team management was attacked and beaten by a mob.

In September 2022, five fans were arrested for raising the Kurdistan flag during an Amedspor game, though they were later released.

In October 2022, the Diyarbakır Bar Association filed a criminal complaint against a Turkish military officer from Afyon, who reportedly told the players of Afjet Afyonspor that he hoped, following an alleged "PKK terror attack in Mersin," they would "crush" Amedspor in the upcoming match, an action described as inciting violence.

In August 2024, 13 people from Diyarbakır were reportedly attacked in Ürgüp, Nevşehir, after wearing Amedspor jerseys. According to Turkish media reports, the assailants initially threatened them and later returned with a larger group, attacking them with sticks, stones, and knives, injuring three people. The "racist attack" was condemned by Amedspor.

On 2 May 2026, following Amedspor's 3–3 draw against Iğdır FK, which secured the club's promotion to the Süper Lig, Amedspor player Mbaye Diagne was surrounded by Turkish police when he displayed the flag of Senegal after the match. Reports indicated that police initially mistook the flag for a pro-Kurdish or PKK-related symbol. A brief confrontation occurred, during which officers were also reported to have attempted to obstruct filming of the incident. The situation was later resolved after it was clarified that the flag represented Senegal. Tensions continued shortly afterward. After returning to Diyarbakır, Diagne again displayed the Senegalese flag by hanging it from the balcony of his apartment, which led to a visit from police.

== League participations ==
- Süper Lig (1): 2026–present
- TFF First League (2): 2024–2026
- TFF Second League (14): 2007–2010, 2013–2024
- TFF Third League (16): 1994–2007, 2010–2013
- Amateur League (22): 1972–1994

== Honours ==
- TFF Second League

Winners (1): 2023–24 (Red Group)

- TFF Third League

Winners (2): 2006–07 (Group 1), 2012–13 (Group 1)

== Current squad ==
As of 27 August 2026

Note: Flags indicate national team as defined under FIFA eligibility rules; some limited exceptions apply. Players may hold more than one non-FIFA nationality.

| No. | Pos. | Nation | Player |
|---|---|---|---|
| 3 | DF | TUR | Miraç Acer |
| 4 | DF | SCO | David Bates |
| 5 | DF | KOS | Lumbardh Dellova |
| 6 | MF | AUT | Cem Üstündağ |
| 7 | MF | KOS | Ermal Krasniqi |
| 8 | MF | TUR | Furkan Soyalp |
| 10 | FW | SUI | Samuel Ballet |
| 11 | FW | NGR | Yira Sor |
| 17 | DF | TUR | Umut Meraş |
| 18 | MF | GER | Gökhan Gül |
| 19 | FW | TUR | Muhammed Yıldırım |
| 21 | DF | TUR | Mehmet Yeşil |
| 22 | MF | MAD | Rayan Raveloson |
| 27 | GK | TUR | Burak Bozan |

| No. | Pos. | Nation | Player |
|---|---|---|---|
| 33 | DF | GUI | Amadou Cissé |
| 40 | GK | CIV | Alban Lafont |
| 45 | FW | SEN | Mbaye Diagne (captain) |
| 47 | DF | TUR | Kahraman Demirtaş |
| 74 | FW | SYR | Mohamed Khalil |
| 77 | FW | TUR | Dilhan Demir |
| 81 | DF | TUR | Ali Turap Bülbül |
| 91 | MF | ISR | Dia Saba |
| 93 | MF | COM | Rayan Lutin |
| 97 | MF | TUR | Berk Kızıldemir |
| 99 | FW | NGR | Gift Orban (on loan from TSG Hoffenheim) |
| — | GK | TUR | Veysel Sapan |
| — | DF | TUR | Berat Perçin |

=== Out on loan ===
Note: Flags indicate national team as defined under FIFA eligibility rules; some limited exceptions apply. Players may hold more than one non-FIFA nationality.

| No. | Pos. | Nation | Player |
|---|---|---|---|
| — | DF | TUR | Ayaz Arslan (at Bitlis 1916 FSK until 30 June 2027) |
| — | DF | TUR | Emrullah Ertuş (at Düzcespor until 30 June 2027) |

| No. | Pos. | Nation | Player |
|---|---|---|---|
| — | FW | TUR | Cıvan Süer (at 12 Bingölspor until 30 June 2027) |

== See also ==
- Amed S.F.K. (women's football)
