= Meşale Tolu =

German journalist and translator

Meşale Tolu Çorlu
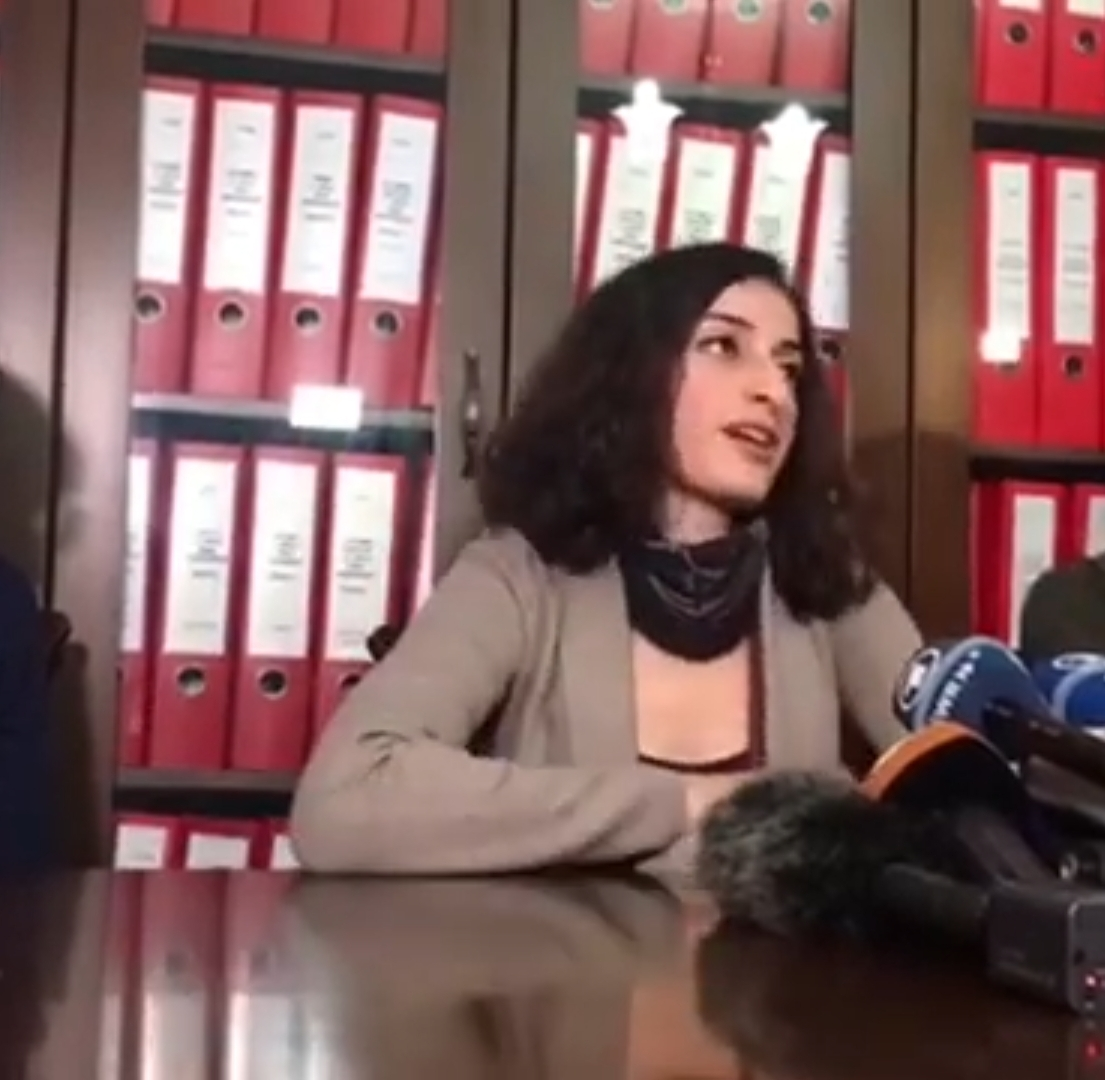
- Born: Meşalle Tolu; 1984 (age 41–42); Ulm, Baden-Württemberg, Germany
- Education: Ethics, Spanish language
- Alma mater: Goethe University Frankfurt
- Occupations: Journalist, translator
- Children: 1

Meşale Tolu Çorlu (born Tolu in 1984) is a German journalist and translator of Kurdish descent. She was arrested in Turkey for allegations on spreading propaganda for an illegal organization and her membership in the organization.

== Early life ==
Meşale Tolu was born to second-generation emigrated Turkish parents as the youngest of three siblings in Ulm, Baden-Württemberg, Germany in 1984. Her father Ali Rıza Tolu is an auto mechanic. She was reared by her grand mother after her mother died in a road accident during a holiday trip to Turkey in 1990.

She completed her secondary education with the high school diploma Abitur at the Anna-Essinger-Gymnasium in Ulm. Tolu studied Ethics and Spanish language at the Goethe University Frankfurt for teaching in a gymnasium.

In 2007, Tolu acquired German citizenship, and renounced her Turkish citizenship. After she gave birth to her son Serkan in Neu-Ulm end 2014, she moved with her husband Suat Çorlu to Istanbul, Turkey to work as a reporter and translator. However, her permanent residence remained in Neu-Ulm, Bavaria, Germany.

== Journalist and translator career ==
From 2014 on, Tolu Çorlu worked in Istanbul, Turkey for various media. She was employed by the radio station "Özgür Radyo". The radio station was closed by a governmental decree after the 2016 Turkish coup d'état attempt. She also worked as a translator for the leftist news agency "Etkin Haber Ajansı" (ETHA).

== Arrest in Turkey ==
Around 4:30 local time on May 1, 2017, an anti-terror squad of the Turkish Police raided the residence of the family Çorlu in Kartal, Istanbul Province. As her husband was already arrested in Ankara on April 5, she was alone at home with her two and half year old son. After her arrest, her residence was searched and devastated. She committed her child to a neighbor's care as she was hauled off by the police. Her brother Hüseyin went the same day to Istanbul to take care of the child. Later, her father took over the care of the little boy in the residence in Istanbul.

Tolu Çorlu was accused of spreading propaganda for the illegal Marxist–Leninist Communist Party of Turkey (MLKP) and membership in the organization. She was detained in the Bakırköy Women's Prison on May 6. She was incarcerated in a prison quarter for 24 inmates. After two weeks, her son could stay with her in the prison. Only in the beginning of June, German diplomats were allowed to visit her in the prison. In August, the public prosecutor demanded 15-year sentence in prison for her. The court ruled in a routine session on August 23 that she had to remain in detention due to a possible risk of absconding and a not yet completed collection of evidence. The first court session, at which 18 suspects were involved, took place in Silivri, Istanbul on October 9. She rejected all allegations and complained about her detention. Mid December 2017, the court decided her release from prison. However, she was not allowed to leave the country. She had to report her presence at the police station every Monday. The next court hearing of Tolu Çorlu was set for April 26, 2018.

On August 20, 2018, a Turkish court revoked her ban from leaving the country and Tolu travelled back to Germany on August 26. At that time her husband was still banned from leaving Turkey, but later in October of the same year a Turkish court revoked his travel ban. In 2019 Tolu published a book on her case entitled „Mein Sohn bleibt bei mir!“: Als politische Geisel in türkischer Haft und warum es noch nicht zu Ende ist ("My son stays with me!: As a political hostage in Turkish imprisonment and why it hasn't ended yet").
