= Nadiye Gürbüz =

Turkish journalist

- Occupations: Journalist; editor
- Employers: Atılım; Etkin News Agency
- Known for: Reporting on femicide and women's rights

Nadiye Gürbüz is a Turkish journalist. She is known for her work as a journalist and editor for socialist outlets such as Atılım and the Etkin News Agency, focusing on social issues such as femicide and women's rights. Gürbüz has been arrested on multiple occasions as a result of her work, and she has been imprisoned since February 2026 on charges of being a member of a terrorist organisation.

== Career ==
Gürbüz was inspired to become a journalist following the death of Metin Göktepe, a Kurdish photojournalist who was tortured and murdered while in police custody in Istanbul in 1996. She began writing for the newspaper Atılım shortly afterwards, and later joined the Etkin News Agency, in addition to freelance reporting for radio stations and other opposition newspapers and news agencies.

Gürbüz's reporting has primarily focused on social issues, such as femicide and the suspicious or unexplained deaths and disappearances of women, as well as on the rights of workers, women, and oppressed and marginalised groups living in Turkey. She investigated the disappearance of Gülistan Doku, a 21-year-old student who was last seen in Tunceli in 2020, and the death of Rojin Kabaiş, a student whose body was found on the shore of Lake Van a month after she went missing in 2024. Additionally, Gürbüz published information on poor conditions for female prisoners at Bakırköy Women's Prison, including severe overcrowding.

== Arrests and imprisonment ==
On 30 April 2023, Gürbüz was arrested and subsequently charged with publishing propaganda for a terrorist organisation. The evidence cited against her included articles published by the Etkin News Agency that she had not written. On 12 October, Gürbüz was released from custody without having been tried, though was made to report to police weekly until she was acquitted of the charges in 2025.

On 3 February 2026, the Etkin News Agency's offices in Istanbul were raided by police officers; two days later Gürbüz, alongside fellow editor Pınar Gayıp and reporter Elif Bayburt, were arrested on suspicion of being linked to the Marxist–Leninist Communist Party, which was deemed to be a terrorist organisation by the Turkish government. The arrests occurred during a wider operation targeting the Socialist Party of the Oppressed and civil society groups suspected of having links to the MLKP. Over 100 people were arrested during the operation.

In September 2026, Gürbüz, Gayıp and Bayburt's cases were heard at separate court hearings. While Gayıp and Bayburt were released on bail following their hearings, at Gürbüz's hearing at the 25th Istanbul Court of Serious Crimes on 15 September, it was decided that she would remain in pre-trial detention until her next hearing on 8 December. The court ruled she could not be released as not all the witnesses pertaining to her case had been heard. During the hearing, Gürbüz had denied that she was a member of the MLKP, and described herself as a "socialist journalist", and accused Turkish authorities of trying to silence opposition and criticism by arresting journalists. Evidence cited against Gürbüz included her attending a commemoration of the Suruç bombing in Kadıköy; transferring money to Gayıp, which Gürbüz attributed to them being roommates; and commemorating Nazim Daştan and Cihan Bilgin, two Turkish journalists who had been killed in a drone attack.

== Response ==
The Committee to Protect Journalists called on Turkish authorities to release Gürbüz and to stop "trials where the practice of journalism is presented as evidence of a crime".
