= Sedef Kabaş =

Turkish journalist (born 1968)

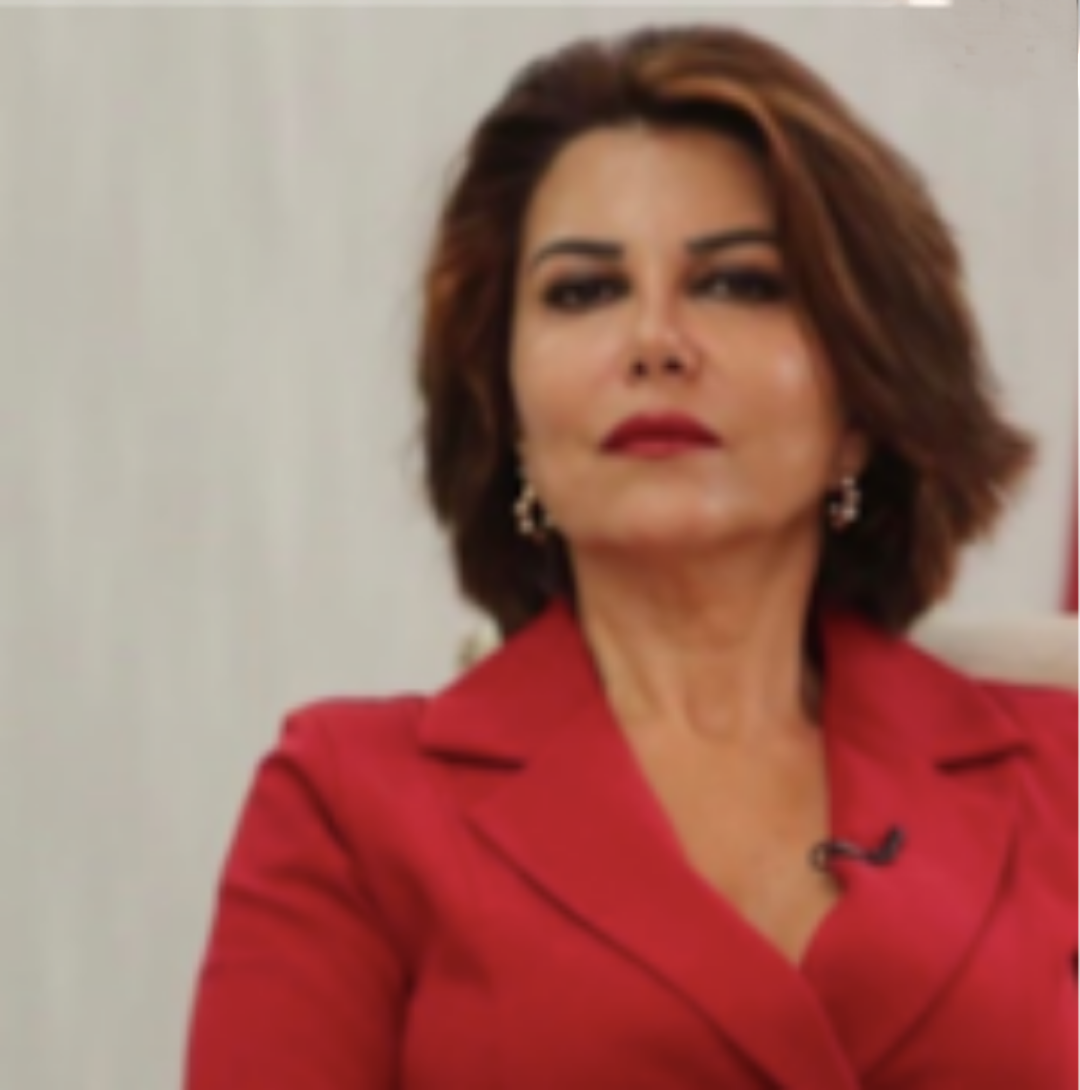
- Kabaş in 2022
- Born: 8 December 1968 (age 57); London, United Kingdom
- Education: Boğaziçi University; Boston University; Marmara University
- Occupation: Journalist
- Years active: 1992–present

Sedef Kabaş (born 8 December 1968) is a Turkish journalist and television presenter who has presented on various news channels in Turkey since 1997. In January 2022, she received international attention after she was arrested following a television interview in which she was alleged to have insulted Recep Tayyip Erdoğan.

== Early life and education ==
Kabaş was born on 8 December 1968 in London in the United Kingdom, the daughter of Mualla and Mehmet Kabaş, a jeweller. She graduated with a degree in international relations at Boğaziçi University in Istanbul in 1992, before going on to study in the United States after receiving a Fulbright scholarship. She subsequently obtained a master's degree in television journalism from Boston University in Boston, Massachusetts. In 2002, Kabaş started to study for a doctorate at Marmara University; she graduated in 2007 after the completion of her thesis entitled "a qualitative evaluation of interviews in the context of journalists in today's Turkish press" in which she criticised the role of pro-government speakers who often appeared within media content and played important roles in influencing public discourse.

== Professional career ==
In 1992, Kabaş was among the inaugural journalists of Power FM where she presented news bulletins. Between 1995 and 1997, she worked for CNN International's Atlanta bureau, becoming the organisation's first Turkish journalist. During her time at CNN, Kabaş reported on the Middle East, Europe, and the conflict in the Balkans.

In 1997, Kabaş returned to Turkey, where she worked as a journalist for a variety of organisations, including NTV, ATV, TV8, and Sky Turk. From the late 1990s, she hosted the Portreler (English: "portraits") series in which she interviewed notable Turkish guests, including Cem Karaca, Ahmet Kaya, Gazanfar Özcan, Cüneyt Arkın, Tarkan, Sakıp Sabancı, Hulki Aktunç, Üzeyir Garih, Avni Arbaş, Mümtaz Soysal, and Uğur Dündar. For this series, Kabaş was awarded 1999 Diyalog Award for Best Presenter. Between 2001 and 2011, Kabaş worked as a visiting professor of journalism at various establishments in Turkey, including Bahçeşehir University, Kültür University, Kadir Has University. Between 2001 and 2011 she gave courses media relations, diction, effective voice and body language, presenting skills, reporting techniques and effective news writing.

Between 2005 and 2023, Kabaş published seven books. In addition to this, she hosted news programs such as "Sesli Düşünenler" on TV8, "Haber Ötesi" on Sky Turk and "Halk İçin Halk Adına" on Tele1 TV.

== Legal prosecution ==
In 2015, Kabaş was arrested and tried on charges pertaining to articles and social media posts she made on Twitter concerning the 2013 corruption scandal in Turkey. She was ultimately acquitted of the charges. In 2019, Kabaş was charged with insulting the president following comments made during a television appearance; she received a suspended prison sentence of 11 months.

=== January 2022 arrest ===
Kabaş made her statement on 14 January 2022, during an appearance on Demokrasi Arenası on Tele1. Journalist and presenter Uğur Dündar was accompanied with Deputy Chairman of the Republican People's Party (CHP) Engin Özkoç, CHP member of parliament Aykut Erdoğdu and Kabaş herself. During the program president Erdoğan was a subject of their political discussion. Prior to her criticised words she said "there is a very famous proverb that says that a crowned head becomes wiser. But we see it is not true" (Turkish: Taçlanan baş akıllanır).

Right after this Turkish proverb Kabaş quoted a Circassian proverb in which she stated "a bull does not become a king just by entering the palace, but the palace becomes a barn" (Turkish: öküz saraya çıkınca kral olmaz, ama saray ahır olur), which was perceived to be in reference to the country's president, Recep Tayyip Erdoğan; Kabaş subsequently posted the quote on her Twitter account. Erdoğan's spokesman, Fahrettin Altun, described the comments as "irresponsible" and accused Kabaş of "spreading hate" on Twitter. On 22 January, she was arrested in a hotel in Istanbul on charges of insulting the president, and was subsequently ordered by a judge to be jailed until her trial date. She was detained at Bakırköy Women's Prison in Istanbul, facing a possible prison sentence of between one and four years.

The editor of Tele1, Merdan Yanardağ, labelled Kabaş's arrest as "unacceptable" and called it an attempt by the government to "intimidate journalists, the media, and society".

On 27 January, Kabaş's lawyer announced that a criminal complaint had been filed on her behalf against the Minister of Justice, Abdülhamit Gül, after he spoke out in defence of Kabaş's arrest.

During an interview with NTV on 27 January, Erdoğan commented on Kabaş's arrest, stating "likening the administrative centre of the Republic of Turkey to a sty, which we call the home of the nation, is an insult to our beloved people". He added that the charges levied against Kabaş had "nothing to do with freedom of expression".

Kabaş's arrest received international press attention, including from the BBC, The Guardian, and CNN. On 24 January 2022, the Turkish Radio and Television High Council issued Tele1 with a 5% revenue fine and a five-day ban from broadcasting following an enquiry into their decision to broadcast Kabaş's comments; a further 3% fine was issued after Tele1 journalist Uğur Dündar criticized this decision.

On 1 February 2022, 27 international groups wrote an open letter calling on the Turkish government to release Kabaş and to end judicial harassment of independent media. The signatories included the International Press Institute, the Association of European Journalists, the European Centre for Press and Media Freedom, and Freedom House. On 8 February, Erdoğan filed a civil lawsuit against Kabaş seeking 250,000 liras (approximately $18,400) in damages for libel.

On 11 March 2022, Kabaş attended her first hearing at the İstanbul 36th Criminal Court of First Instance. The court acquitted her of the charges of insulting a public official, issued her a suspended sentence for insulting the president, and ordered her immediate release.

Following Kabaş' release from prison, a 70-year-old citizen Ali Yılmaz tweeted his well wishes and repeated the proverb. He was arrested on 14 March and briefly detained.
