= Mansur Çalar =

Turkish footballer

Personal information
- Date of birth: 24 February 1986 (age 40)
- Place of birth: Batman, Turkey
- Position: Defensive midfielder

Senior career*
Years	Team	Apps	(Gls)
2005–2009	Amed	51	(6)
2009–2010	Eyüpspor	9	(0)
2010–2012	Amed	62	(10)
2012–2013	Menemenspor	29	(4)
2013–2014	Trabzon Akçaabat	27	(6)
2014–2023	Amed	207	(19)
- * Club domestic league appearances and goals as of 30 October 2022

Mansur Çalar (born 24 February 1986) is a Turkish footballer of Kurdish descent who plays as a defensive midfielder for Amed. He became the captain of his team. After a scandal during a league match, in which he assaulted several Sakaryaspor players with a razor blade, he was initially banned by the Disciplinary Committee of the Turkish Football Association (TFF) for life. However, the Arbitration Board of the TFF reduced his ban for life into 20 matches suspension.

== Career ==
Çalar played in his youth with Batman Fatihspor and 72 Batmanspor, 2005, he signed with Amed S.K., then called Diyarbakır BB Diskispor, his first professional contract and came to 23 missions in the 2007/08 season of the third division. He was able to establish himself right away and came to 2009 to a total of 51 games before he moved to Istanbul to Eyüpspor. After only nine games, he returned to Amed and played another 62 league games, where he scored 10 goals. After short seasons at Menemen Belediyespor and Trabzon Akçaabat F.K. In 2014, he returned to Amed for the second time and was one of the regular greats. He made more than 100 league appearances and became captain.

== Suspension ==
On matchday 24 of the 2018–19 TFF Second League season it came to a game against Sakaryaspor, the scandal, as could be demonstrated by video excerpts after the game that Çalar had smuggled a razor blade into the field and this also used four opponents and the latter incised cuts, The Disciplinary Committee of the TFF punished Çalar due to this extremely gross unsportsmanlike with a four-year ban. In accordance to the rules of the Turkish Football Association, an exclusion of more than three years automatically leads to a life-long suspension, Çalar in Turkey may not come in any game for both professional and amateur clubs. He was also fined 25,000 Turkish lira (about 4,000 euros). Çalar himself denies the allegations and is of the opinion that he had not used a razor blade or other objects, this is also not visible on the videos. He had been a professional footballer for more than 15 years and would not allow such derailments.

The club board backed Çalar, claiming at a press conference that Çalar and Amed SK were victims of a plot. The players of Sakaryaspor were programmed from the beginning of the game to provoke the players of Amed. As proof, chairman Ali Karakaş showed a photo showing the professional Dilaver Güçlü, his hands wallowing in a wolf greeting during the Turkish national anthem, a hallmark of the nationalistic Gray Wolves. If Çalar had used a razor blade, the players in Karakaş's view would have had to roll or even bleed on the floor in pain, but both were not on the videos. The alleged victim from his point of view had the cuts themselves inflicted.

His initial ban for life by the Disciplinary Committee was reduced to 20 games suspension by the Arbitration Board of the TFF.
