= BirGün =

Turkish newspaper

- Type: Daily newspaper
- Format: Broadsheet
- Publisher: Birgün Yayıncılık ve İletişim Tic. A.Ş.
- Editor-in-chief: Berkant Gültekin, Can Uğur
- Founded: 14 April 2004
- Political alignment: Left-wing
- Language: Turkish
- Headquarters: Beyoğlu, Istanbul
- Circulation: 32,423
- Website: www.birgun.net

BirGün (One Day) is an Istanbul-based Turkish left-wing daily.

The paper was founded in 2004 by a group of Turkish intellectuals. The most important point of the newspaper is that it is not owned by any parent company or conglomerate.

There is no position of Editor-in-Chief at the newspaper. The newspaper’s Publication Coordinators are İbrahim Varlı and Yaşar Aydın, and the Managing Editor is Berkant Gültekin. As of 2016, it has begun publishing the BirGün Book supplement.

Since its foundation, the newspaper had to face serious pressures from publishing trusts, mainly to affiliated with Doğan Media Group that owns the vast majority of the market. Whereas most of the newspapers in Turkey pay paper and publishing cost as installments, BirGün had to pay in cash. In order to afford the costs, the newspaper first launched a subscription campaign, then raised its price to 0.75 TL. The price was 1 TL in 2012 and 1,5 TL in Summer 2015 while also costs 40 kuruş (0,4 TL) on universities in Turkey. BirGün 's sales have tripled since 2013, especially after the Gezi protests, reaching 25,000 copies. Hrant Dink, who was murdered in 2007, was also one of BirGün 's writers.

Most of the BirGün columnists are members or sympathizers of the socialist Left Party (SOL), formerly known as the Freedom and Solidarity Party (ÖDP), which is a member of Party of the European Left and one of the founders of European Anti-Capitalist Left.

== Critism ==
On 8 May 2016, in an interview in the newspaper’s *Pazar* (Sunday) supplement about Mine G. Kırıkkanat’s newly published book, a question posed by journalist Özlem Özdemir went with saying “So women are like property, I mean?”while discussing the status of women within the PKK, the question and statement drew public backlash. The newspaper issued a statement apologizing for the incident and changed the question on its website to “Are women regarded as worthless?”. On 9 May 2016, Kırıkkanat posted a statement on her Twitter account saying: “Apologizing for foolishness and rudeness does not suit @BirGun_Gazetesi. While speaking of libertarian democracy, it has surrendered to pressure and fear.”

== Columnists ==
- Ataol Behramoğlu
- Korkut Boratav
- Şeyhmus Diken
- Hrant Dink
- Hayri Kozanoğlu
- Fikri Sağlar
- Süreyya Evren
- Tarık Günersel
- Zeynep Kuray
- Sabri Kuşkonmaz
- Oğuzhan Müftüoğlu
- Sırrı Süreyya Önder
- Ece Temelkuran
- Güven Gürkan Öztan
- Oğuz Oyan
- Timur Soykan
- Merdan Yanardağ
