= Çekdar Orhan =

Turkish footballer

Personal information
- Date of birth: 8 March 1998 (age 28)
- Place of birth: Hakkâri, Turkey
- Height: 1.72 m (5 ft 8 in)
- Position: Midfielder

Team information
- Current team: Şanlıurfaspor
- Number: 10

Youth career
- 2014–2015: Borussia Mönchengladbach
- 2015: Wuppertaler SV
- 2016–2017: 1. FC Mönchengladbach
- 2017–2018: Rot-Weiß Oberhausen
- 2018–2019: Galatasaray

Senior career*
Years	Team	Apps	(Gls)
2019–2021	Akhisarspor	43	(5)
2021–2024	Giresunspor	19	(1)
2022	→ Tuzlaspor (loan)	11	(1)
2022–2023	→ Tuzlaspor (loan)	4	(0)
2023	→ Amedspor (loan)	12	(3)
2024–2026	Amedspor	49	(9)
2026–	Şanlıurfaspor	3	(0)

International career^{‡}
2016	Turkey U16	2	(0)
- * Club domestic league appearances and goals as of 1 October 2026 ‡ National team caps and goals as of 03:08, 2 November 2021 (UTC)

Çekdar Orhan (born 8 March 1998) is a Turkish football player of Kurdish origin residing in Germany. He plays for Şanlıurfaspor in the TFF 2. Lig.

== Career ==
Born in Turkey and raised in Germany, Orhan is a youth product of the German clubs Borussia Mönchengladbach, Wuppertaler SV, 1. FC Mönchengladbach and Rot-Weiß Oberhausen. He returned to Turkey to join the academy of Galatasaray in 2018. He began his senior career with Akhisarspor in the TFF First League in 2019, before transferring to Giresunspor on 15 August 2021. He made his professional debut with Giresunspor in a 2-1 Süper Lig loss to Antalyaspor on 1 November 2021.

== Personal life ==
Orhan is the nephew of the Kurdish actors Yılmaz Erdoğan and Ersin Korkut.
