= Ebru Şallı =

Turkish model (born 1977)

- Born: 15 January 1977 (age 49); Istanbul, Turkey
- Occupations: Actress, author, model, TV presenter
- Years active: 1995–present
- Spouses: Ozan Orhon (m. 1997; div. 1998) Harun Tan (m. 2002; div. 2013) Uğur Akkuş (m. 2019)
- Children: 2

Ebru Şallı (born 15 January 1977) is a television personality, model, author, actress, and former beauty pageant titleholder from Turkey.

== Biography ==
Ebru Şallı was born in Istanbul in 1977. She graduated from Nişantaşı Girls' High School a year after she won the Queen of Turkey beauty pageant in 1995. Following the beauty pageant, she starred in several television series. Up to 2014, Ebru Şallı has created 7 instructional DVDs for fitness and pilates, the first of which sold over 55,000 units. She also authored numerous pieces on homemaking and pilates, and made dozens of television appearances. Şallı released four books under the Alfa publishing imprint, Hamilelikte Güzel ve Sağlıklı Kalmak (2008), Besleyici ve Lezzetli Çocuk Yemekleri: Ebru Şallı (2009), Ebru'nun Doğal Güzellik Sırları (2009), and Ebru'nun Mutfağından (2011). She launched her online shopping website, Ebru Şallı Store, in 2012.

== Conviction of drug abuse ==
On 16 June 1999, Şallı was convicted of drug abuse, after she was accused of using cocaine. She spent fifteen days at the Bakırköy Women's Prison in Istanbul.

== DVDs ==
- Ebru Şallı ile Pilates
- Ebru Şallı ile Pilates 2
- Ebru Şallı ile Hamilelikte Pilates
- Selülit Savar
- Ebru Şallı ile 21 Günde Yağlarınızdan Kurtulun
- Ebru Şallı ile Karınsavar
- Yogalates (2014)

== Filmography ==
Television
Year	Title	Role	Notes
1995	Gölge Çiçeği		Guest appearance
1998	Unutabilsem	Selma	
2000	Aşk Hırsızı		
2002	Belalım Benim		
2002	Reyting Hamdi	Ebru	
2006–2007	Ebru'nun Mutfağı	Host	TV show
2008–present	Ebruli	Host	TV show

== Publications ==
- Hamilelikte Sağlıklı ve Güzel Kalmak (2005)
- Ebru Şallı'dan Çocuklar için Besleyici Eğlenceli Lezzetler (2007)
- Ebru'nun Doğal Güzellik Sırları (2009)
- Ebru'nun Mutfağından (2011)
- Besleyici ve Lezzetli Çocuk Yemekleri (2012)
- Ebru Şallı ile Pilates (2014)
