= Metin Göktepe =

Kurdish photojournalist

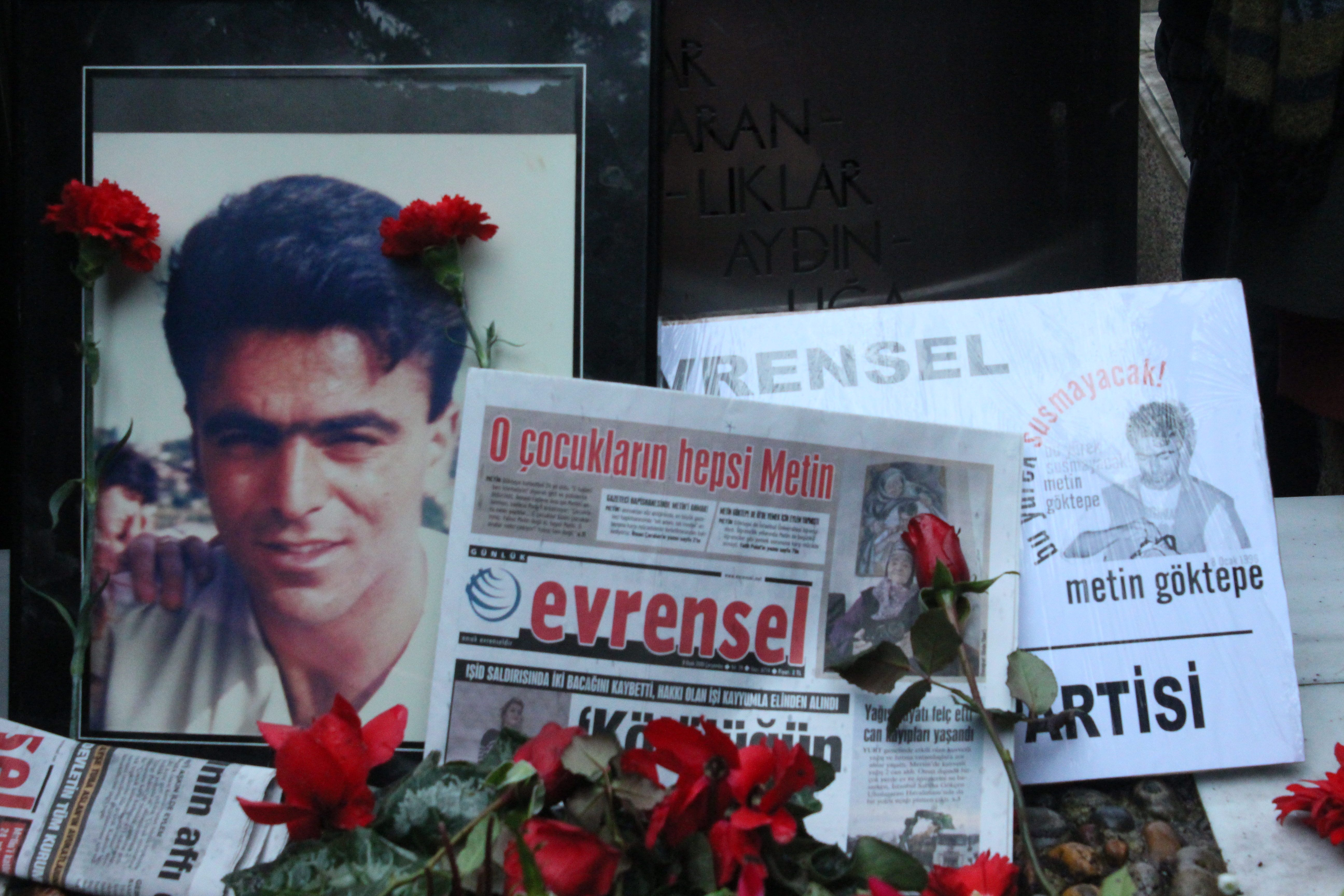
- The tomb of Metin Göktepe pictured during a memorial in 2020
- Born: April 10, 1968; Gürün, Turkey
- Died: January 8, 1996 (aged 27); Istanbul, Turkey
- Education: Istanbul University
- Occupations: Journalist, photojournalist, reporter
- Years active: 1992–1996
- Notable credit(s): Photojournalist, reporter for Evrensel

Metin Göktepe (pronounced [metin ɟœctepe]; April 10, 1968 – January 8, 1996) was a Kurdish photojournalist who was tortured and murdered in police custody in Istanbul on January 8, 1996.

== Life ==
Metin Göktepe was born to a Kurdish family in Sivas on April 10, 1968, in the village of Çipil of Gürün district. He was the seventh and penultimate child of his parents. He attended primary school in Sivas until fourth grade and moved with his family to Istanbul in 1979 where he completed the fifth grade and his secondary studies in 1986. In 1989, he started attending The Department of Public Finance in the Faculty of Economics of Istanbul University, and he was introduced to politics through his older sister and brother and student associations. Prior to his graduation, he started his career in Gerçek (The Truth) magazine in 1992, and later also started to work for the leftist periodical Evrensel as a reporter in 1995.

== Torture and assassination ==
Göktepe, who went to the Alibeyköy Cemetery at noon on January 8 in order to cover the funeral of two leftist inmates, Rıza Boybaş (pronounced [ɾɯza bojbaʃ]) and Orhan Özen (pronounced [oɾhan øzen]), who were beaten to death during prison riots in the Ümraniye Prison in Istanbul on January 4, 1996, was detained by police who blockaded the region. Göktepe was beaten and taken to the Eyüp Closed Sports Hall. He was kept at the sports hall for a while, reportedly felt sick there, and was then taken somewhere else by the police. In the course of contacts between lawyers acting for Evrensel, the police authorities and the Eyüp public prosecutor, it was stated that Göktepe was in detention and that he would be released in the evening unless legal charges were brought. But no further news of Metin Göktepe was released. An unknown person, who was detained and then released, called the Evrensel newspaper around 8 pm and reported that Göktepe had been beaten to death. At the initiative of lawyers for the paper, the fact that Metin Göktepe had been killed was exposed. Making a statement about the incident, Eyüp Public Prosecutor Erol Can Özkan claimed that Göktepe, after having been released on the evening of January 8, had been found dead in a park 100 meters from the Eyüp Closed Sports Hall at around 8 pm. It was later established that Göktepe's body had been found not in the park but in front of a buffet close to the sports hall. An autopsy showed that internal bleeding in Göktepe's brain and tissues, which occurred as a result of the blows to the head and body, was the cause of death.

=== Trial ===
Ten police officers were put on trial for Göktepe's death. Five were acquitted, and five were sentenced to 18 years, commuted to 7 years because of "good manner at the court" and "it was impossible to determine the real assailant.". After spending 1 year and 8 months in prison, the five police officers were released as part of an amnesty.

== See also ==
- Metin Göktepe Journalism Awards
- Nadiye Gürbüz, journalist inspired by Göktepe
