= Zeynep Kuray =

Kurdish journalist

- Born: 1978 (age 47–48)
- Occupation: Journalist
- Writing career
- Language: Kurdish, Turkish, French
- Years active: 2008-present
- Notable awards: Recipients of John Aubuchon Press Freedom Award

Zeynep Kuray (born 1978) is a Kurdish journalist. As of 2015, she wrote for BirGün and the Firat News Agency (ANF). She was kept under arrest between December 2011 and April 2013 as a part of the KCK investigation and is a recipient of the John Aubuchon Award for Press Freedom.

== Early life ==
Kuray is the daughter of activist Sarp Kuray, one of the imprisoned founders of Dev-Genç, and theater actress Ayşe Emel Mesçi. She was born in 1978 and has an elder sister named Sema. Following the 1980 Turkish coup d'état, her family fled to France, where she grew up. Her first language was French and she only moved to Turkey in her 20s. She is of Alevi Turkish background. She played the role of a child in the film Duvar by Yılmaz Güney, filmed while he was in exile in France.

== Career and arrest ==
In 2008, Kuray started reporting for BirGün. She started writing for the ANF in 2010. She was arrested on 20 December 2011 as part of the KCK investigation, as an alleged member of the PKK-affiliated KCK. She was accused of spreading PKK propaganda due to her articles in the ANF, which is ideologically aligned with the PKK. She was detained at the Bakırköy Women's Prison, until her release on 26 April 2013. Whilst in prison, she went on a hunger strike, calling for the wider official use of Kurdish in the public sphere and the removal of Abdullah Öcalan from his isolation in prison. In 2013, she was awarded the Ilaria Alpi Award but the award was later denied to her and given to another journalist as she was banned from leaving Turkey and so could not collect the award. She was given the John Aubuchon Award for Press Freedom by the American National Press Club in 2013. She was arrested on 15 April 2015 again, due to her investigation of events in Yüksekova, where she allegedly investigated an execution without trial, but released on the same day. She was detained while covering protests in Eminönü on May 10, 2019. Then, she was released after her statement on May 13, 2019.
