= Amadou Cissé (footballer, born 2006) =

Guinean footballer (born 2006)

Personal information
- Date of birth: 27 February 2006 (age 20)
- Place of birth: Coyah, Guinea
- Height: 1.83 m (6 ft 0 in)
- Position: Centre-back

Team information
- Current team: Amedspor
- Number: 45

Youth career
- 2022–2023: Mulhouse

Senior career*
Years	Team	Apps	(Gls)
2023–2024	Haguenau	2	(0)
2024–2026	Strasbourg II	26	(0)
2024–2026	Strasbourg	1	(0)
2025	→ Le Mans (loan)	0	(0)
2026–	Amedspor	0	(0)

International career^{‡}
2026–	Guinea	1	(0)
- * Club domestic league appearances and goals as of 19:18, 4 June 2026 (UTC) ‡ National team caps and goals as of 19:18, 4 June 2026 (UTC)

Amadou Cissé (born 27 February 2006) is a Guinean professional footballer who plays as a centre-back for Turkish Süper Lig club Amedspor and the Guinea national team.

== Club career ==
Born in Coyah, Guinea, Cissé developed through the youth academies of FC Mulhouse and FCSR Haguenau before joining Strasbourg in July 2024. He made his first official appearance for the club in the Coupe de France, coming on in a second-round tie against Thaon-les-Vosges on 15 January 2025.

After making several appearances for the professional squad during the 2024–25 season, Cissé signed his first professional contract with Strasbourg in the summer of 2025, running until June 2028, and was immediately loaned to Le Mans FC in Ligue 2 for the 2025–26 season. His loan was cut short due to injury and he returned to Strasbourg before the end of 2025. He made his Ligue 1 debut on 19 April 2026, starting in Strasbourg's 0–3 defeat to Rennes.

On 8 July 2026, Cissé signed a three-year contract with Amedspor in Turkey.

== International career ==
In May 2026, Cissé was called up to the Guinea senior squad by head coach Paulo Duarte for a friendly against Northern Ireland on 4 June 2026 in Spain, as part of the June 2026 FIFA international window. He was among the first players to arrive at the training camp in Málaga on 28 May 2026.
