= Suzan Zengin =

Turkish journalist and human rights activist

- Born: 1959; Sivas, Turkey
- Died: 12 October 2011 (aged 51–52); Istanbul, Turkey
- Occupations: Journalist, translator
- Children: 2

Suzan Zengin (1959 – 12 October 2011) was a Turkish journalist, translator and human rights activist. She was detained on accusation of membership in an illegal organization for almost two years.

== Early years ==
Suzan Zengin was born as one of the six children of a family from Sivas in 1959. At the age of ten, she went to Germany, where she lived 18 years. During her education there, she was interested in the problems of immigrants.

She married Bekir Zengin and gave birth to two children.

== Journalist and translator career ==
Suzan Zengin had been an employee of the "Umut Publishing" since 2003, and a journalist since 2007 for the daily İşçi-Köylü Gazetesi (literally: "Workers'-Peasants' Newspaper") issued by the same publisher. She was the local representative of the newspaper in Kartal, Istanbul Province. Zengin was a human rights activist, and worked also for the Human Rights Association of Turkey (İHD).

She translated a number of anthologies into Turkish language including Kıbrıs Elen Edebiyatı ("Hellenic Literature of Cyprus"), Selanik Öyküleri ("Stories of Thessaloniki"), Süryani Halk Öykü ve Türküleri ("Stories and Folk Songs of Assyrians"). During her confinement, she translated the book Persecution, Expulsion and Annihilation of the Christian population in the Ottoman Empire, 1912-22 ("Birinci Dünya Savaşı ve Sonrasında Anadolu Hristiyanlarının Sürgün, Kıyım ve Tasfiyesi") written by the German historian Tessa Hofmann (Savvidis), and made it ready for publication.

== Arrest ==
Zengin was detained in Bakırköy Women's Prison on 29 August 2009 after she was arrested the day before while her residence was raided by police. Her trial began only on 26 August 2010. She was accused of membership in the illegal and armed far-leftist organization TKP/ML TİKKO. She faced a 15-year sentence in prison according to the indictment.

In the prison, she contracted health issues, which continuously worsened during her incarceration. She was released from the prison after almost two years on 11 June 2011.

== Death ==
Zengin was treated for her illness, however, her health condition was much advanced. She underwent a cardiac surgery in a hospital for chest diseases in Koşuyolu, Üsküdar due to excessive vasodilation coronary vein. She died after 17 days in the intensive care ward at the age of 52 on the night of 12 October 2011.

Zengin was buried following a funeral service at a cemevi in Tuzla, Istanbul according to her religious belief of Alevism.
