= Death of Rojin Kabaiş =

Death of a Turkish woman

Rojin Kabaiş
- Born: 20 March 2003; Diyarbakır, Turkey
- Died: 15 October 2024 (aged 21); Van, Turkey
- Resting place: Yeniköy, Bağlar, Diyarbakır
- Education: Van Yüzüncü Yıl University
- Occupation: Student (Child Development Department)
- Known for: Drawing public attention due to her disappearance and tragic death

The death of Rojin Kabaiş came to light after her body was discovered on the shore of Lake Van, near Mollakasım neighbourhood in the Tuşba district of Van Province, Turkey.

Kabaiş was a first-year student in the Child Development Department at Van Yüzüncü Yıl University. An initial examination conducted at the Van Forensic Medicine Institution found no evidence of sharp-force or gunshot wounds, and no bone fractures were detected. However, discoloration was observed on the neck, knee, and arm areas. The report stated that samples of blood, urine, and internal organs were sent to the Istanbul Forensic Medicine Institute to determine the exact cause of death.

== Course of events ==
Kabaiş had moved from Diyarbakır to Van for her studies. She was reported missing on 27 September 2024. After an 18-day search, her body was discovered on 15 October 2024 on the shore of Lake Van, near Mollakasım Village. A forensic report dated 6 November 2024 stated that DNA samples belonging to two different men were detected; however, no conclusive or suspicious findings were identified from those samples. On 15 October 2025, a parliamentary motion submitted by the Peoples’ Equality and Democracy Party (DEM Party) to investigate Rojin Kabaiş's death was rejected in the Grand National Assembly of Turkey (TBMM) with the votes of the Justice and Development Party (AKP) and the Nationalist Movement Party (MHP).

=== Meeting with Justice Minister ===
On 6 May 2026, Turkish Justice Minister Akın Gürlek met with the family of Rojin Kabaiş regarding the investigation into her death. According to the Ministry of Justice, the family was informed about the progress of the investigation, and Kabaiş's mobile phone was undergoing forensic examination as part of the inquiry.

== Death ==
Rojin Kabaiş's family rejected claims that she had committed suicide or drowned, stating that she did not die in such a way. Journalist Nadiye Gürbüz reported on the suspicious circumstances of Kabaiş's death, and criticised the lack of attention paid to it by the mainstream media in Turkey.

== Protests ==
In Eskişehir a mural created in memory of Rojin Kabaiş was vandalized. The phrase “What happened to Rojin?” and Kabaiş's portrait were defaced, and a Turkish flag was drawn next to them.
