= Esra Mungan =

Turkish academic

- Born: Turkey
- Occupation: Academic

Esra Mungan is a Turkish academic and associate professor of psychology at Boğaziçi University who was arrested in 2016 for signing the Academics for Peace petition "We won’t be a party to this crime!" demanding a peaceful solution to the conflict between the Turkish military and Kurdistan Workers Party (PKK) in South-East Turkey. Mungan was among the 1128 signatories of a January 2016 petition calling for an end to violence in the region. In March 2016 she was arrested for a month. Her university was supportive of her during the period of her arrest.

Mungan, along with other members of Academics for Peace faced up to seven years in prison under Article 301 of the Turkish penal code which penalises 'denigrating Turkishness'. On the first day of her trial for 'terror propaganda', she was freed by a Turkish court “pending permission from the justice ministry” to reduce the severity of the charge.

== Career ==
Mungan studied for her undergraduate degree at Bogazici University before achieving an MA and PhD from American University in Washington, DC.
