= YMCA =

Worldwide youth organization

- Founded: 6 June 1844; 182 years ago
- Founder: George Williams
- Founded at: London, England
- Type: International NGO
- Headquarters: Vernier, Canton of Geneva, Switzerland
- Region served: Worldwide
- President: Soheila Hayek
- Secretary General: Carlos Sanvee
- Staff: 88,485 (2018)
- Volunteers: 919,671 (2018)
- Website: www.ymca.int
- Formerly called: Young Men's Christian Association

YMCA is a worldwide youth organization based in Vernier, Canton of Geneva, Switzerland, with more than 64 million beneficiaries in 120 countries. It has nearly 90,000 staff, some 920,000 volunteers and 12,000 branches worldwide. It was founded in London on 6 June 1844 by George Williams as the Young Men's Christian Association. The organization's stated aim is to put Christian values into practice by developing a healthy body, mind, and spirit.

From its inception, YMCA grew rapidly, ultimately becoming a worldwide movement founded on the principles of muscular Christianity. Local YMCAs deliver projects and services focused on youth development through a wide variety of youth activities, including providing athletic facilities, holding classes for a wide variety of skills, promoting Christianity, and humanitarian work.

YMCA is a non-governmental federation, with each independent local YMCA affiliated with its national organization. The national organizations, in turn, are part of both a geographically regional area alliance and the World Alliance of YMCA. YMCA programs vary between nations and regions, but are all based on the principles espoused in the Paris Basis.

The YMCA is a parachurch organization based on Protestant values. The YWCA is independent of the YMCA, but a few local and national YMCA and YWCA associations have merged into YM/YWCAs or YMCA-YWCAs and belong to both organizations, while providing the programs from each (e.g. Sweden did so in 1966).

== History ==
=== 19th century ===
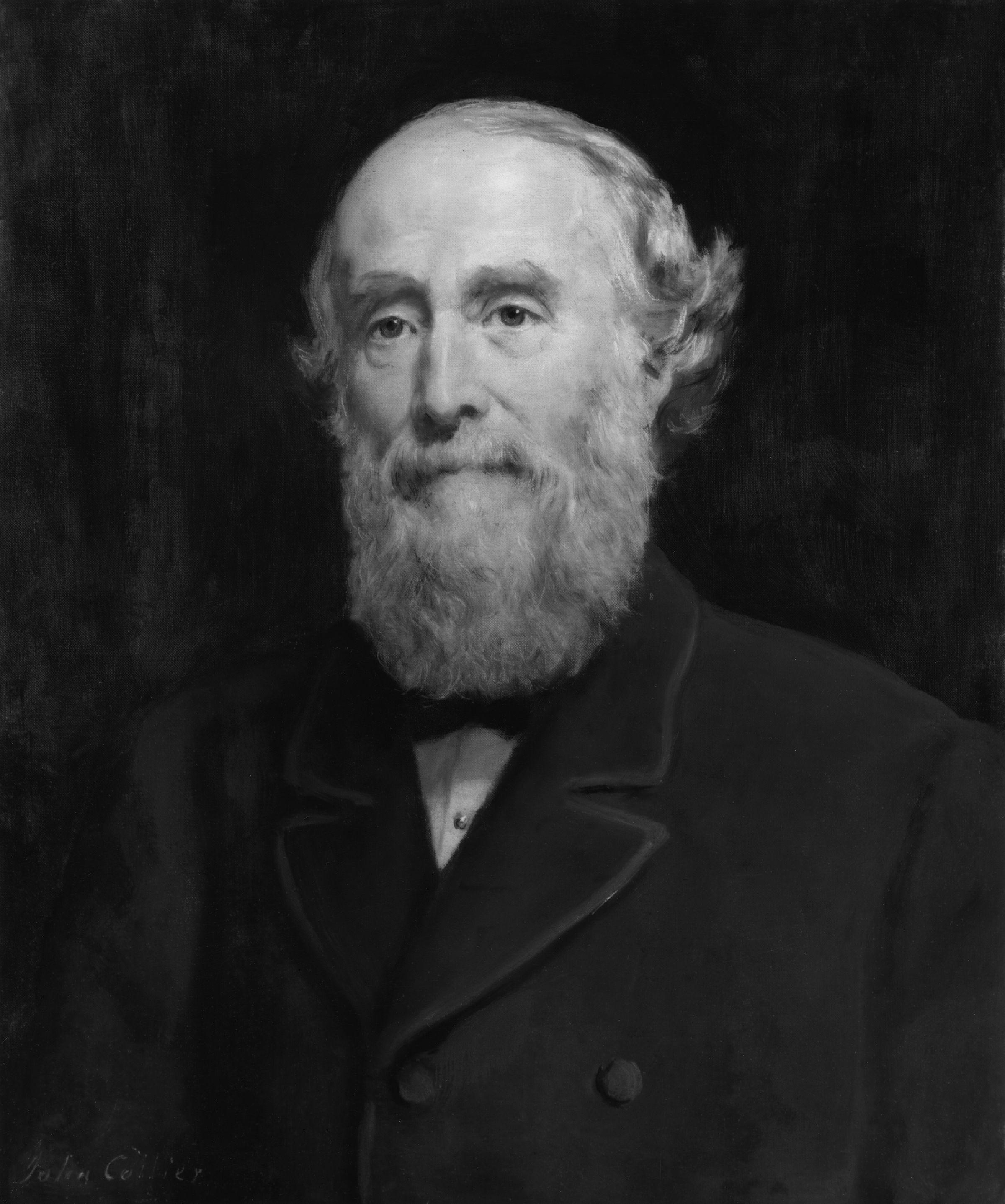
George Williams, who founded YMCA in 1844

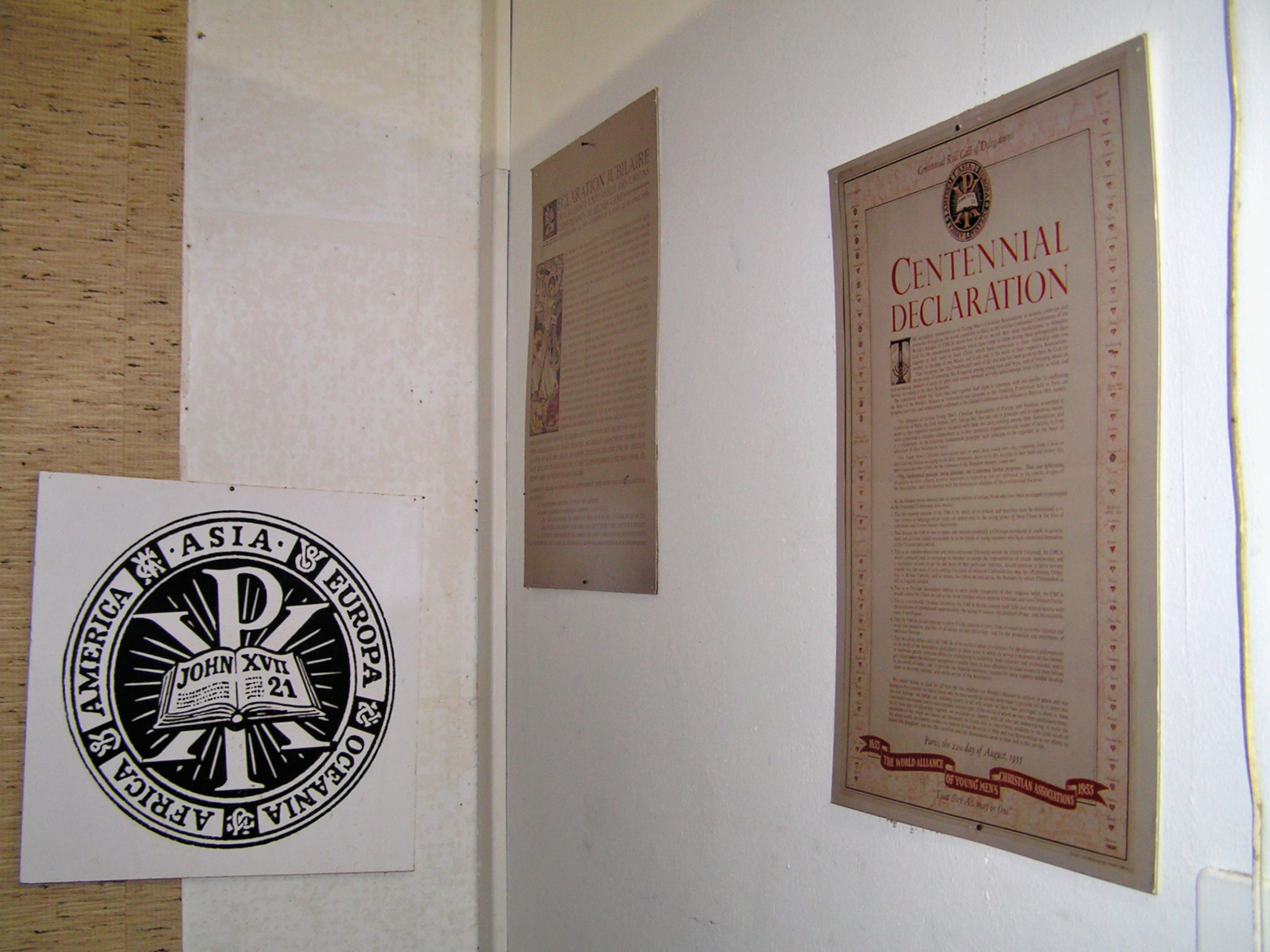
The World Alliance of YMCAs logo displayed in Geneva

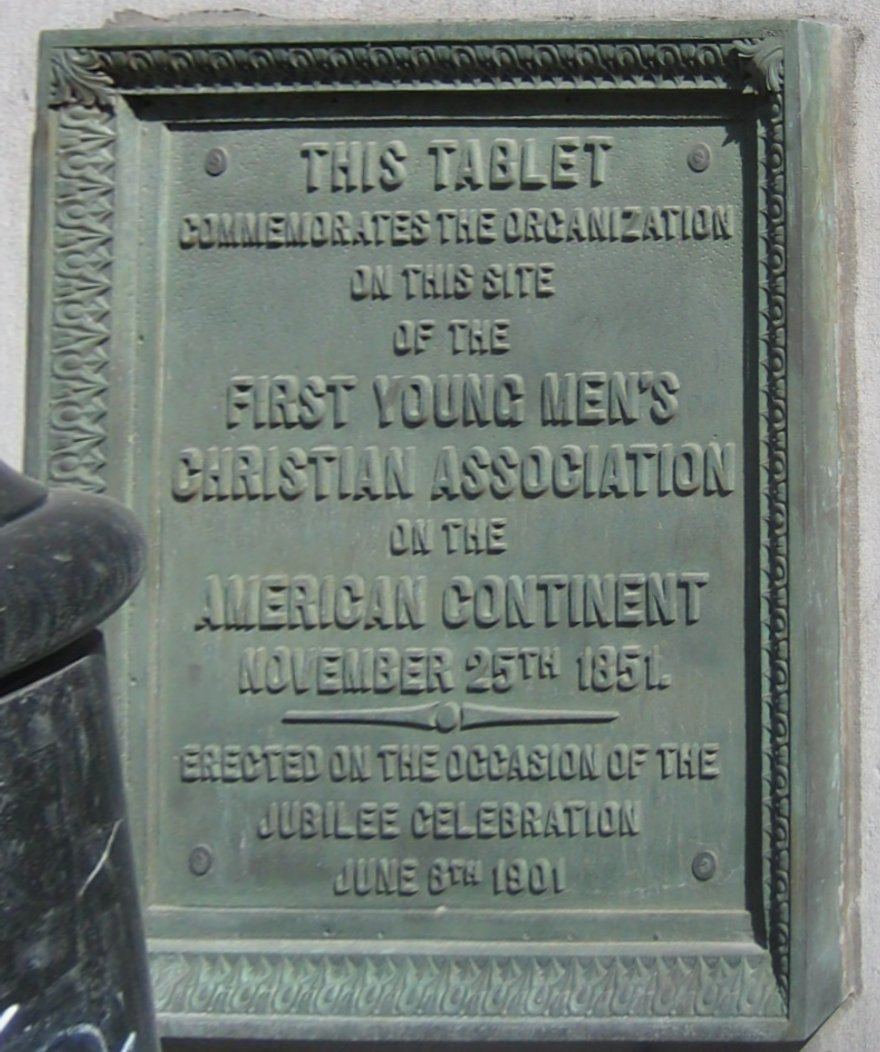
A historical marker at the YMCA in Montreal, noting its 1851 establishment

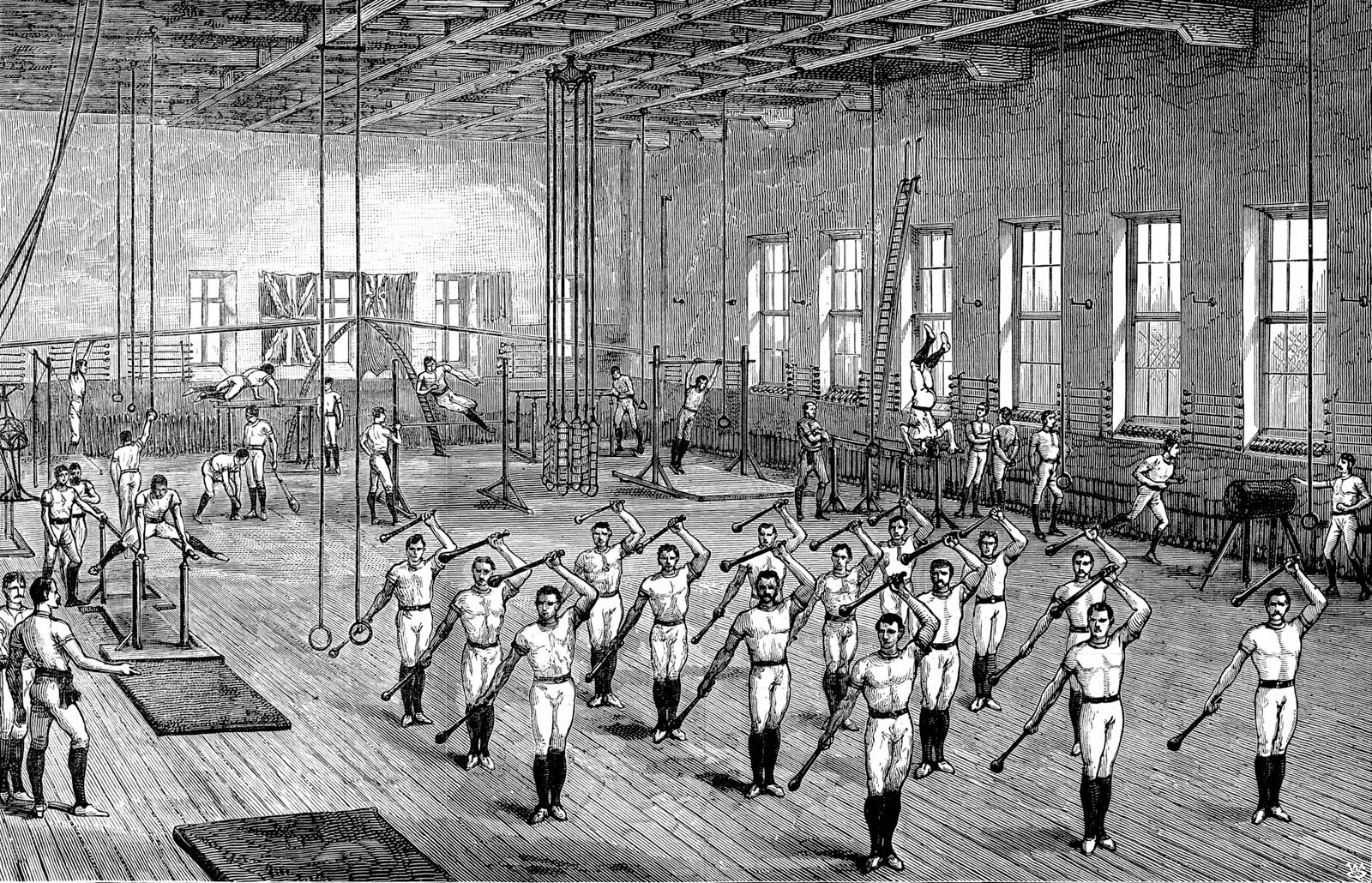
A YMCA gym in London in 1888

An advertisement for the YMCA in Macon, Georgia, c. 1896

The Young Men's Christian Association (YMCA) was founded on 6 June 1844, by George Williams and eleven friends. Williams was a London draper who was typical of the young men drawn to the cities by the Industrial Revolution. They were concerned about the lack of healthy activities for young men in major cities; the options available were usually taverns and brothels. Williams' idea grew out of meetings he held for prayer and Bible-reading among his fellow workers in a business in the city of London, and on 6 June 1844, he held the first meeting that led to the founding of YMCA with the purpose of "the improving of the spiritual condition of young men engaged in the drapery, embroidery, and other trades." The first YMCA premises opened on Great Russell Street, London, in 1844. Anthony Ashley-Cooper, 7th Earl of Shaftesbury served as YMCA's first president from 1851 until his death in 1885.

By 1845, YMCA started a popular series of lectures that from 1848 were held at Exeter Hall, London, and started being published the following year, with the series running until 1865.

YMCA was associated with industrialization and the movement of young people to cities to work. YMCA "combined preaching in the streets and the distribution of religious tracts with a social ministry. Philanthropists saw them as places for wholesome recreation that would preserve youth from the temptations of alcohol, gambling, and prostitution and that would promote good citizenship."

The YMCA spread outside the United Kingdom in part thanks to the Great Exhibition of 1851, the first in a series of World's Fairs which was held in Hyde Park, London. Later that year there were YMCAs in Australia, Belgium, Canada, France, Germany, Hong Kong, the Netherlands, Switzerland, and the United States.

The idea of creating a truly global movement with an international headquarters was led by Henry Dunant, Secretary of YMCA Geneva, who would later go on to found the International Committee of the Red Cross and win the first Nobel Peace Prize. Dunant successfully convinced YMCA Paris to organize the first YMCA World Conference. The Conference took place in August 1855, bringing together 99 young delegates from nine countries, held before the Exposition Universelle (1855). They discussed joining in a federation to enhance cooperation amongst individual YMCA societies. This marked the beginning of the World Alliance of YMCAs. The conference adopted the Paris Basis, a common mission for all present and future national YMCAs. Its motto was taken from the Bible, "That they all may be one" (John 17:21).

Other ecumenical bodies, such as the World YWCA, the World Council of Churches, and the World Student Christian Federation have reflected elements of the Paris Basis in their founding mission statements. In 1865, the fourth World Conference of YMCAs, held in Germany, affirmed the importance of developing the whole individual in spirit, mind, and body. The concept of physical work through sports, a new concept for the time, was also recognized as part of this "muscular Christianity".

The Boy Scouts of America grew out of YMCA work, with YMCA organizers taking over and merging their organization into the Boy Scouts of America soon after it was incorporated by William D. Boyce when it existed only on paper. Edgar M. Robinson, a Chicago-area YMCA organizer became the BSA's first director. YMCA has cooperated with camping organizations, including Boy Scouts of America, Girl Scouts of the USA and Camp Fire.

Two themes resonated during the first World Conference: the need to respect the local autonomy of YMCA societies, and the purpose of YMCA: to unite all young, male Christians for the extension and expansion of the Kingdom of God. The former idea is expressed in the preamble:

The delegates of various Young Men's Christian Associations of Europe and America, assembled in Conference at Paris, the 22 August 1855 feeling that they are one in principle and in operation, recommend to their respective Societies to recognize with them the unity existing among their Associations, and while preserving a complete independence as to their particular organization and modes of action, to form a Confederation of secession on the following fundamental principle, such principle to be regarded as the basis of admission of other Societies in future.

YMCA was influential during the 1870s till the 1930s, when it most successfully promoted "evangelical Christianity in weekday and Sunday services, while promoting good sportsmanship in athletic contests in gyms (where basketball and volleyball were invented) and swimming pools." Later in this period, and continuing on through the 20th century, YMCA had "become interdenominational and more concerned with promoting morality and good citizenship than a distinctive interpretation of Christianity." Prior to the beginning of the American Civil War, YMCA provided nursing, shelter, and other support during wartime in the United States.

In 1878, the World YMCA offices were established in Geneva, Switzerland by Dunant. Later, in 1900, North American YMCAs, in collaboration with the World YMCA, set up centres to work with emigrants in European ports, as millions of people were leaving for the US. In 1880, in Norway, YMCA became the first national organization to adopt a strict policy of equal gender representation in committees and national boards.

In 1885, Camp Baldhead (later known as Camp Dudley), the first residential camp in the United States and North America, was established by George A. Sanford and Sumner F. Dudley, both of whom worked for YMCA. The camp, originally located near Orange Lake in New Jersey, moved to Lake Wawayanda in Sussex County, New Jersey, the following year, and then to the shore of Lake Champlain near Westport, New York, in 1891.

=== 20th century ===
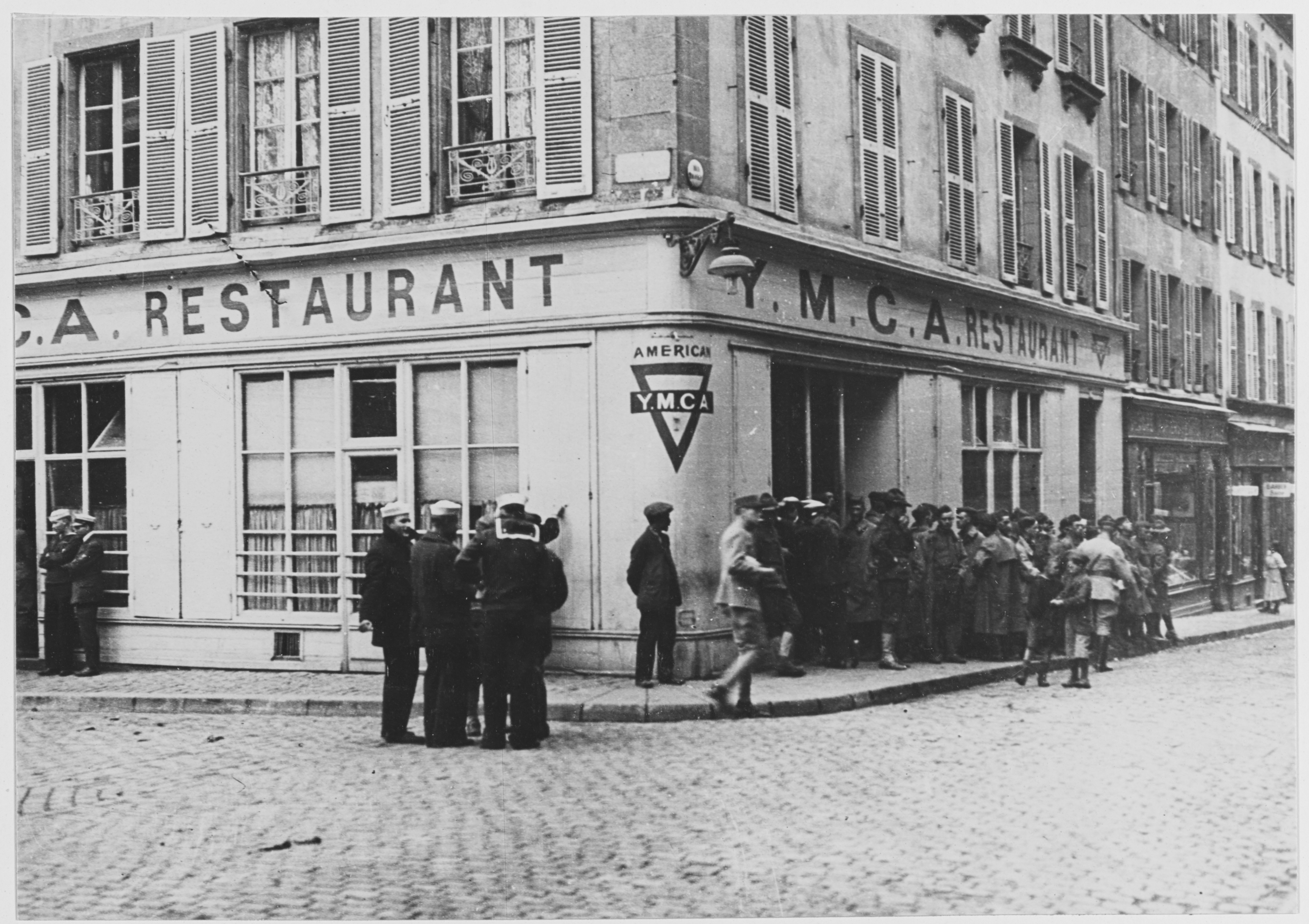
A YMCA in Brest, France in 1902

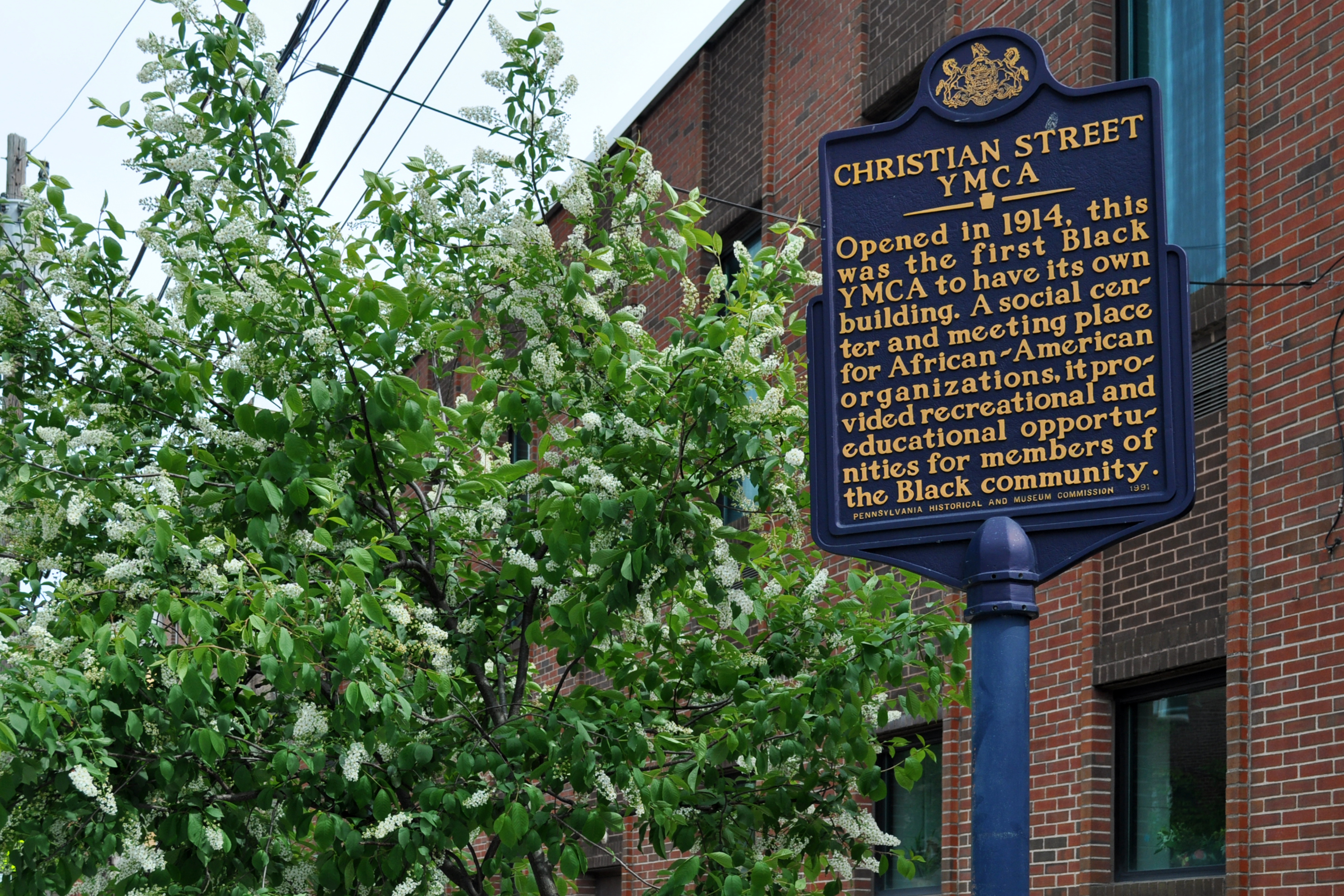
A historical marker for the Christian Street YMCA at 1724 Christian Street in Philadelphia, noting its 1914 establishment

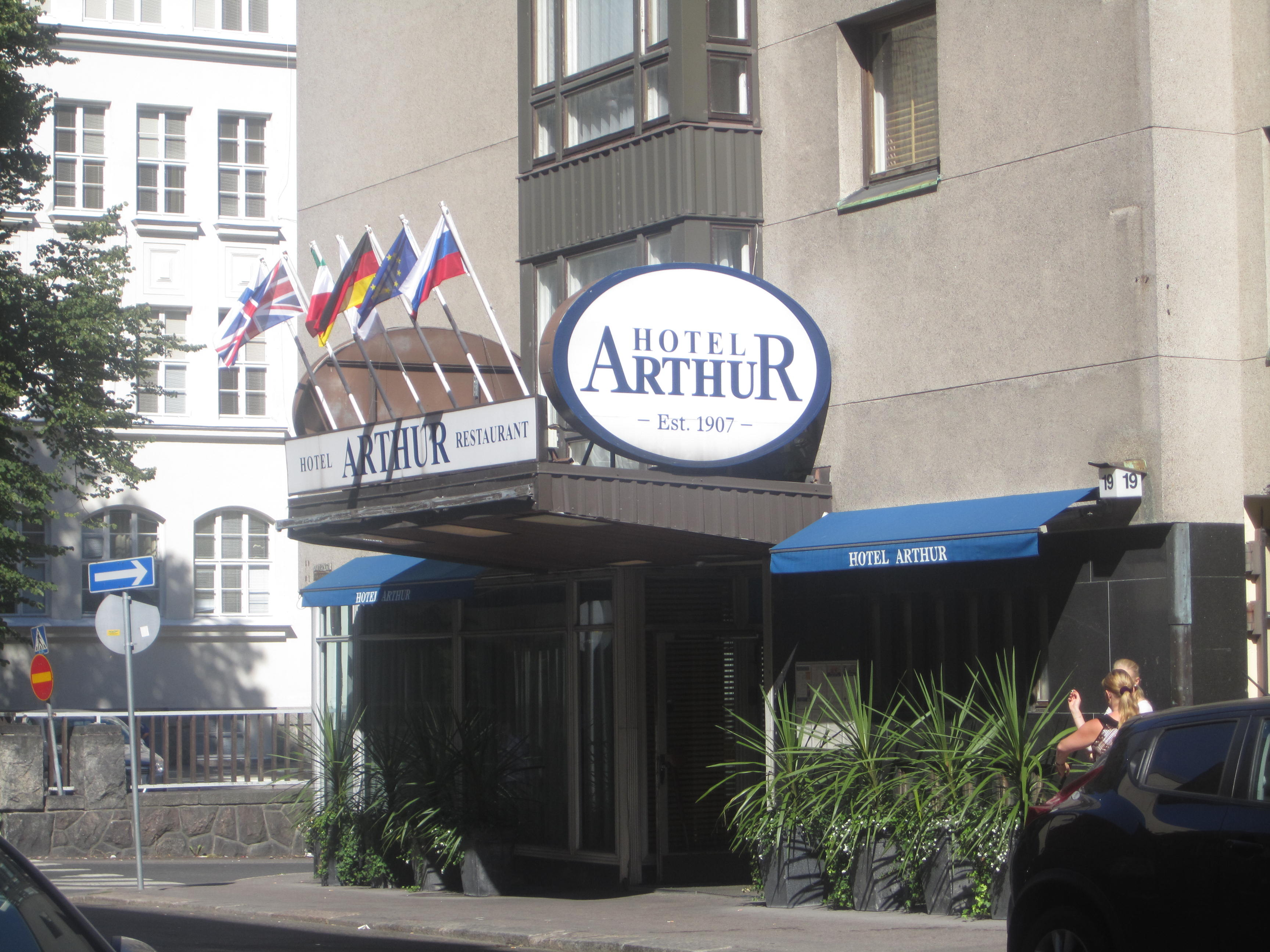
Hotel Arthur in Helsinki, founded by YMCA in 1907

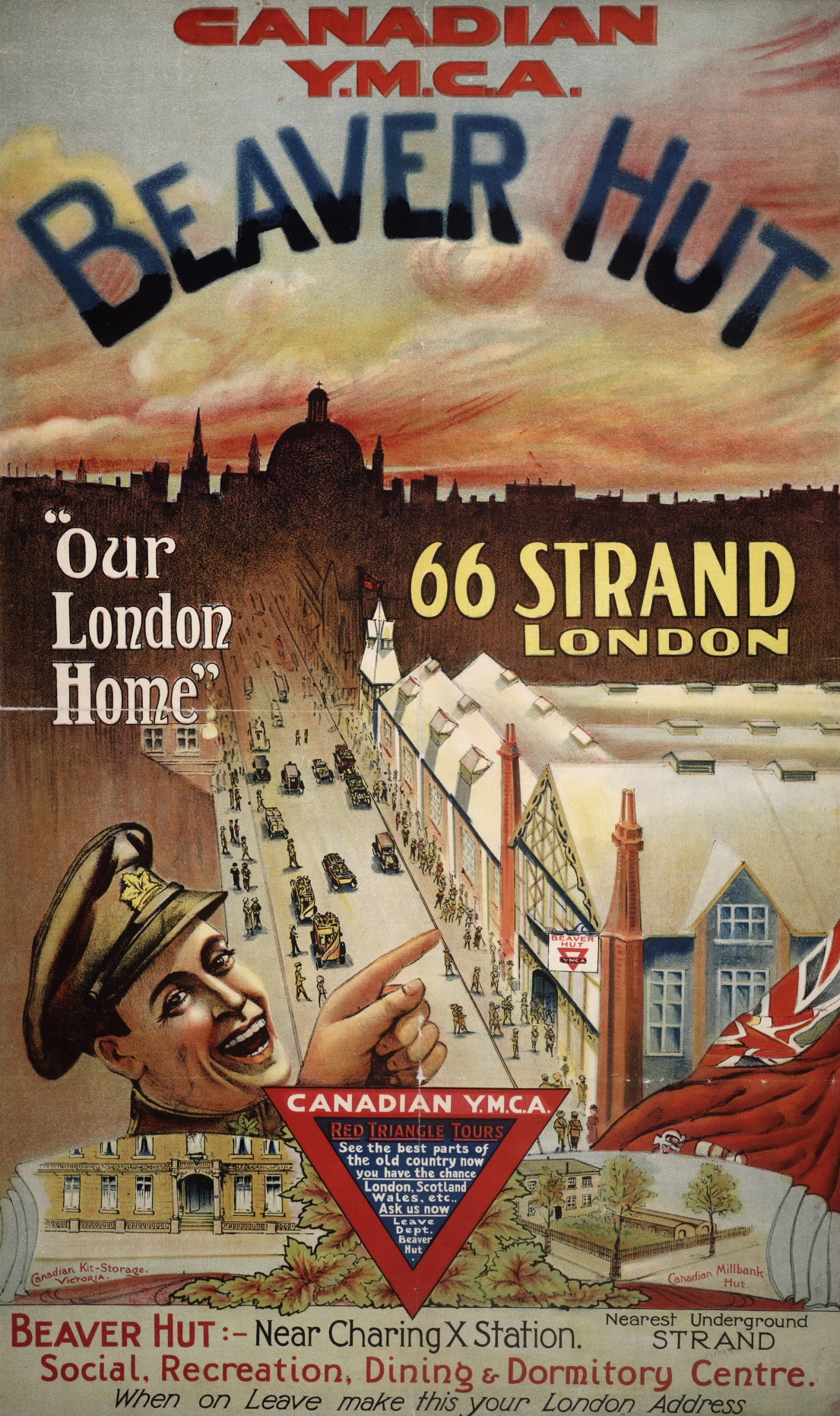
A Canadian YMCA poster in 1914

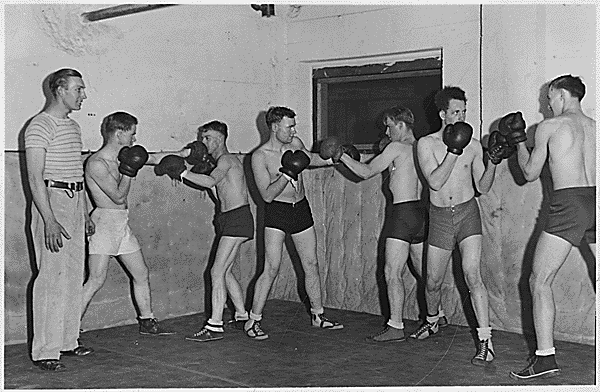
A self-defence class at the YMCA in Boise, Idaho in 1936

A fireplace at the YMCA in Jerusalem in December 1932

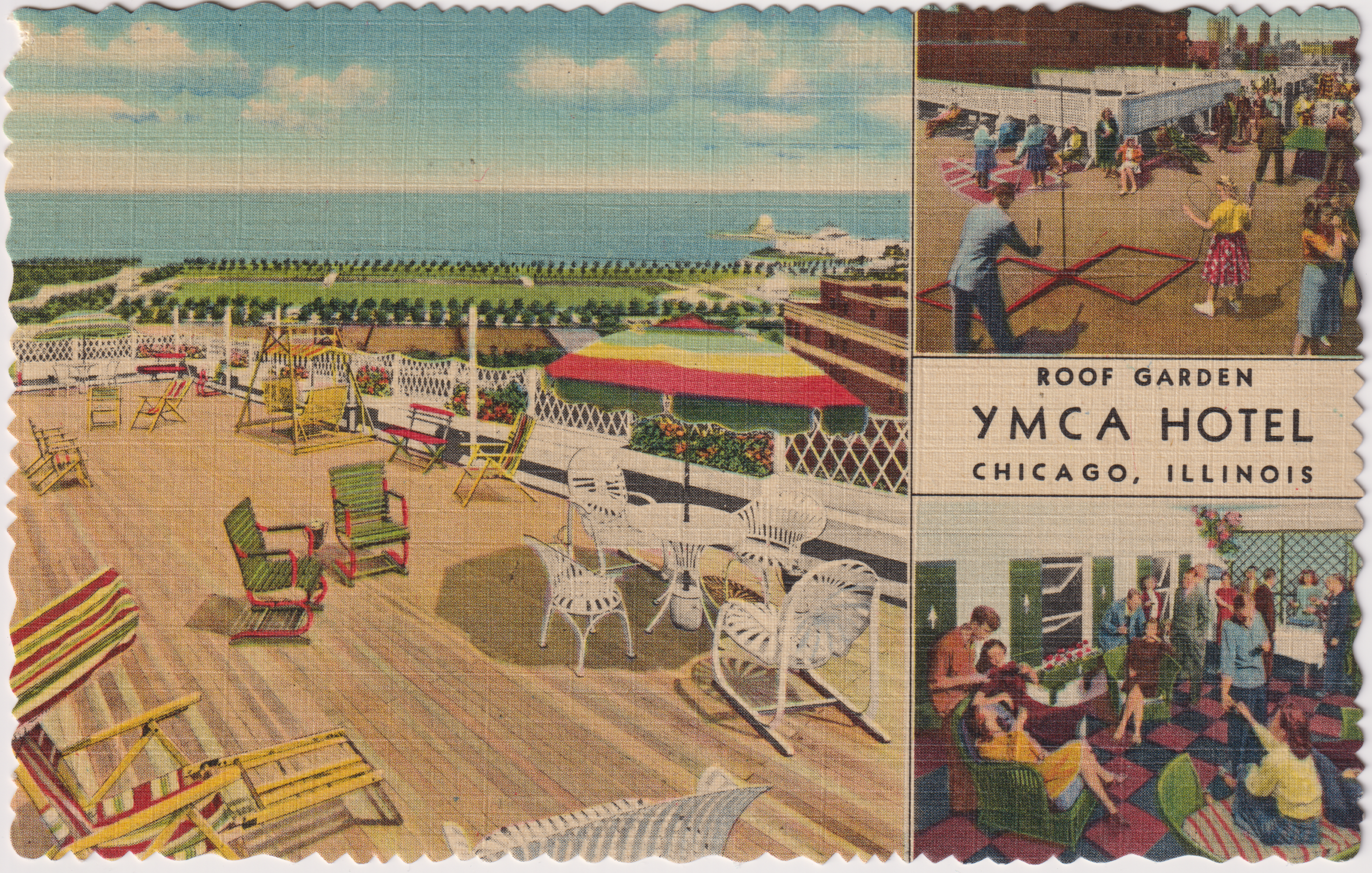
A postcard photograph of the YMCA in Chicago in 1955

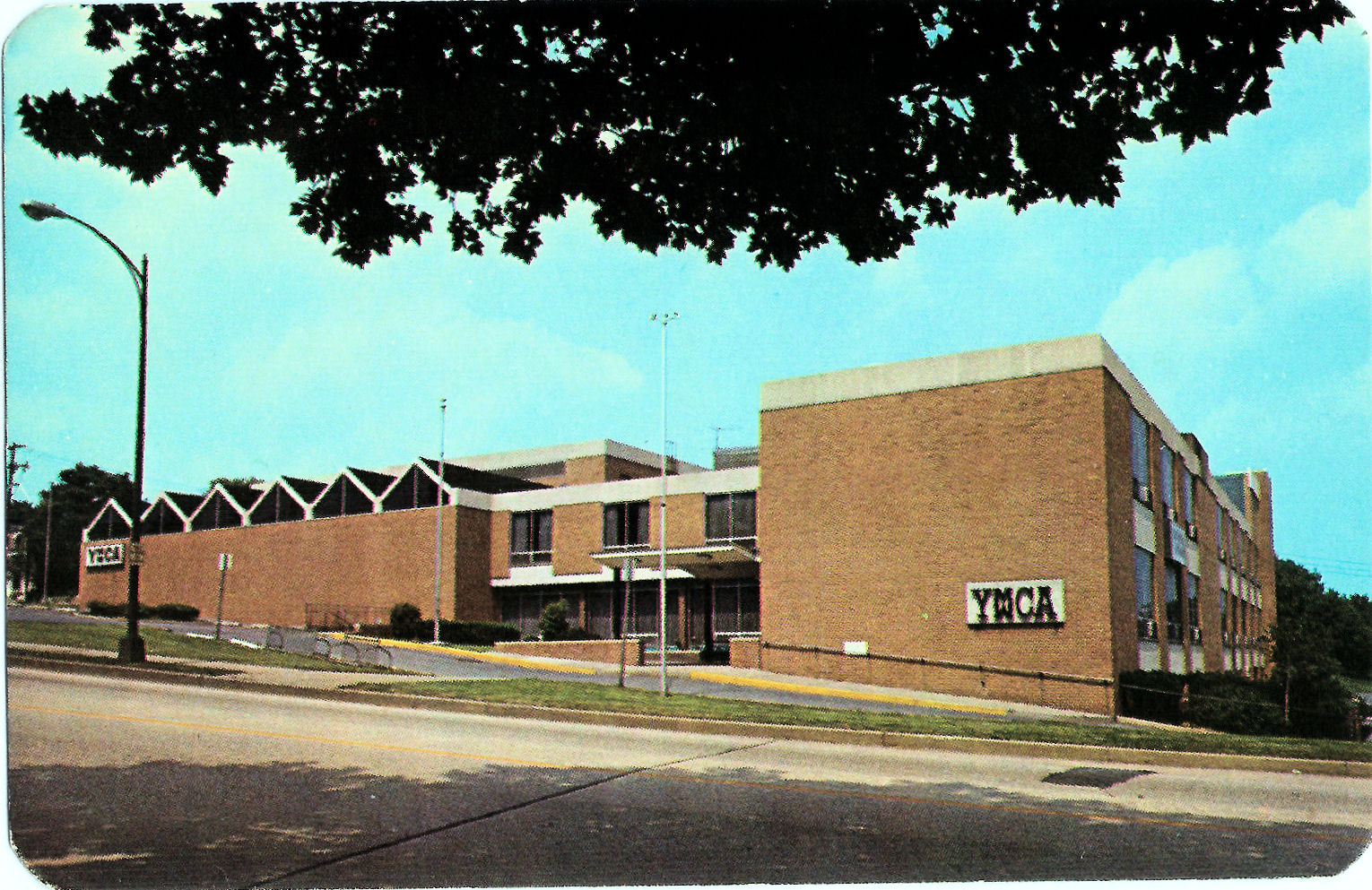
A YMCA in Allentown, Pennsylvania in 1964

==== YMCA Scouts ====
YMCA was one of the earliest organizers of Boy Scouts in the United Kingdom from 1907, before there were central Scout organizations. Some of the first recorded Boy Scout troops were YMCA Boy Scouts who met in the Nottingham and Birkenhead YMCA buildings. YMCA Scouts in Britain remained separate troops under the YMCA but registered with local and central scout associations. Later, when Robert Baden-Powell formed his own Boy Scouts organization, a YMCA worker who had organized many YMCA Boy Scout troops became one of his first two travelling organizers. In Devonport, Tasmania, Australia, YMCA Boy Scouts met at the YMCA hall and later affiliated as 1st Devonport Boy Scouts with the Tasmanian branch of The Boy Scouts Association. The YMCA would also influence the Boy Scouts of America (BSA) and German Scouting. Edgar M. Robinson, a Chicago-area YMCA administrator, worked at YMCA while also becoming the BSA's first director. In Europe, national YMCA Scout organizations were formed.

In 1916, K. T. Paul became the first Indian national general secretary of India. Paul had started rural development programs for self-reliance of marginal farmers, through co-operatives and credit societies. These programmes became very popular. He also coined the term "rural reconstruction", and many of the principles he developed were later incorporated into the Indian's government nationwide community development programs. In 1923, Y. C. James Yen, of YMCA China, devised the "thousand character system", based on pilot projects in education. The method also became very popular, and in 1923, it led to the founding of the Chinese National Association of the Mass Education Movement. In 1878, YMCA was organized near the Jaffa Gate of the Old City of Jerusalem and the current landmark building was dedicated by General Lord Allenby in 1933 during the British Mandate of Palestine.

Within ten days of the declaration of World War I, YMCA had established 250 recreation centres, also known as huts, in the United Kingdom, and went to build temporary huts across Europe to support both soldiers and civilians alike, run by thousands of volunteers. Many soldiers from WW1 were a part of the YMCA and helping with spreading religion in these camps and boosting morale. Some of them, known as field secretaries, also went into war zones to support prisoners-of-war in Europe and Russia. Notable supporters and volunteers included Clementine Churchill (for which she was appointed a Commander of the Order of the British Empire (CBE) in 1918), Oswald Chambers and Robert and Olave Baden-Powell. Within the first month the YMCA Women's Auxiliary was formed, and Princess Helena Victoria of Schleswig-Holstein would go on to become a notable member and chairman of its organizing committee.

During World War I, YMCA raised and spent over $155 million on welfare efforts for American soldiers. It deployed over 25,000 staff in military units and bases from Siberia to Egypt to France. They took over the military's morale and comfort operations worldwide. Irving Berlin wrote Yip Yip Yaphank, a revue that included a song entitled "I Can Always Find a Little Sunshine in the YMCA". Frances Gulick was a YMCA worker stationed in France during World War I who received a United States Army citation for valour and courage on the field.

During World War II, YMCA was involved in supporting millions of POWs and in supporting Japanese Americans in internment camps. This help included helping young men leave the camps to attend Springfield College and providing youth activities in the camps. In addition, YMCA was one of seven organizations that helped to found the USO.

In Europe, YMCA helped refugees, particularly displaced Jews. Sometimes YMCA participated in escape operations. Mostly, however, its role was limited to providing relief packages to refugees.

It was also involved in war work with displaced persons and refugees. It set up War Prisoners Aid to support prisoners of war by providing sports equipment, musical instruments, art materials, radios, gramophones, eating utensils, and other items. Donald A. Lowrie of the YMCA created and led the Committee of Nîmes, also known as the Camps Committee, a group that gathered leaders from over twenty humanitarian organizations to coordinate advocacy for people in the internment camps, including helping children leave these camps to live in children's colonies or eventually escape to freedom.

YMCA Motion Picture Bureau, renamed Association Films in 1946, was one of the United Kingdom's largest non-theatrical distribution companies. In 1947 the World YMCA gained special consultative status with the United Nations Economic and Social Council. In 1955 the first black President of the World YMCA, Charles Dunbar Sherman from Liberia, was elected. At 37 years, he was also the youngest president in World YMCA history. In 1959 YMCA of the USA developed the first nationally organized scuba diving course and certified their first skin and scuba diving instructors.

By 1974, YMCA had set up a curriculum to begin teaching cave diving.

In 1973, the Sixth World Council in Kampala, Uganda, became the first World Council in Africa, hosted by Uganda YMCA. It reaffirmed the Paris Basis and adopted a declaration of principles, known as the Kampala Principles. It include the principles of justice, creativity and honesty. It stated what had become obvious: that a global viewpoint was more necessary. It also recognized that YMCA and its national member organizations would have to take political stands, particularly in international challenges and crises.

In 1976, YMCA of the USA appointed Violet King Henry to executive director to its Organizational Development Group, making her the first woman named to a senior management position with the American national YMCA.

In 1985, the World Council of YMCAs passed a resolution against apartheid, and anti-apartheid campaigns were formed under the leadership of Lee Soo-Min (Korea), the first Asian secretary general of the World YMCA.

In 1998, the 14th World Council of YMCAs in Germany adopted "Challenge 21", intended to place more focus on global challenges, such as gender equality, sustainable development, war and peace, fair distribution, and the challenges of globalization, racism, and HIV/AIDS.

=== 21st century ===
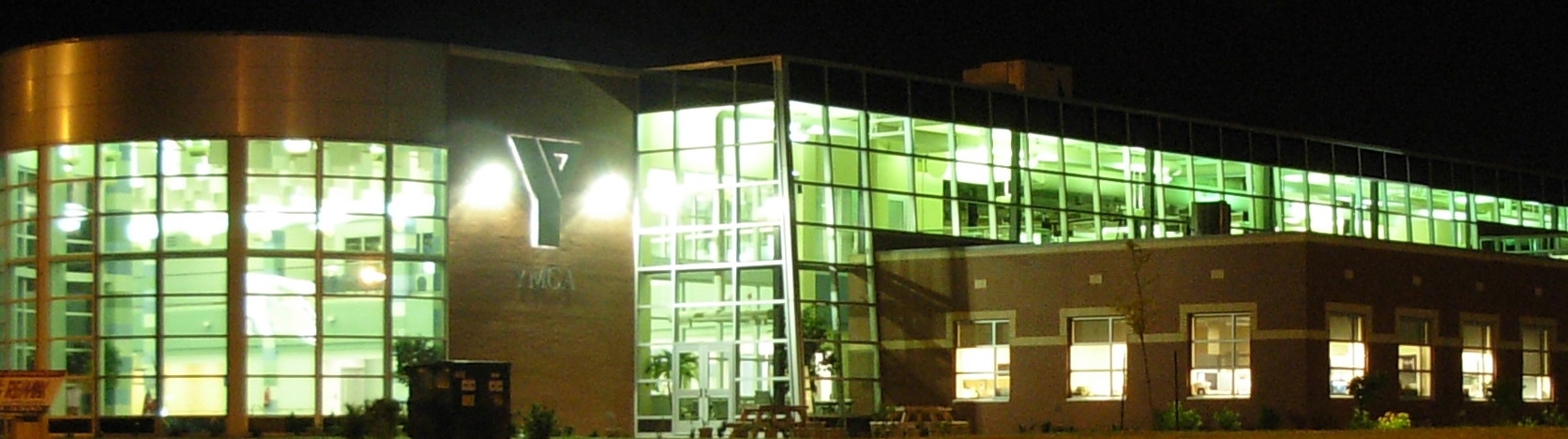
A YMCA in Moncton in New Brunswick, Canada in July 2007

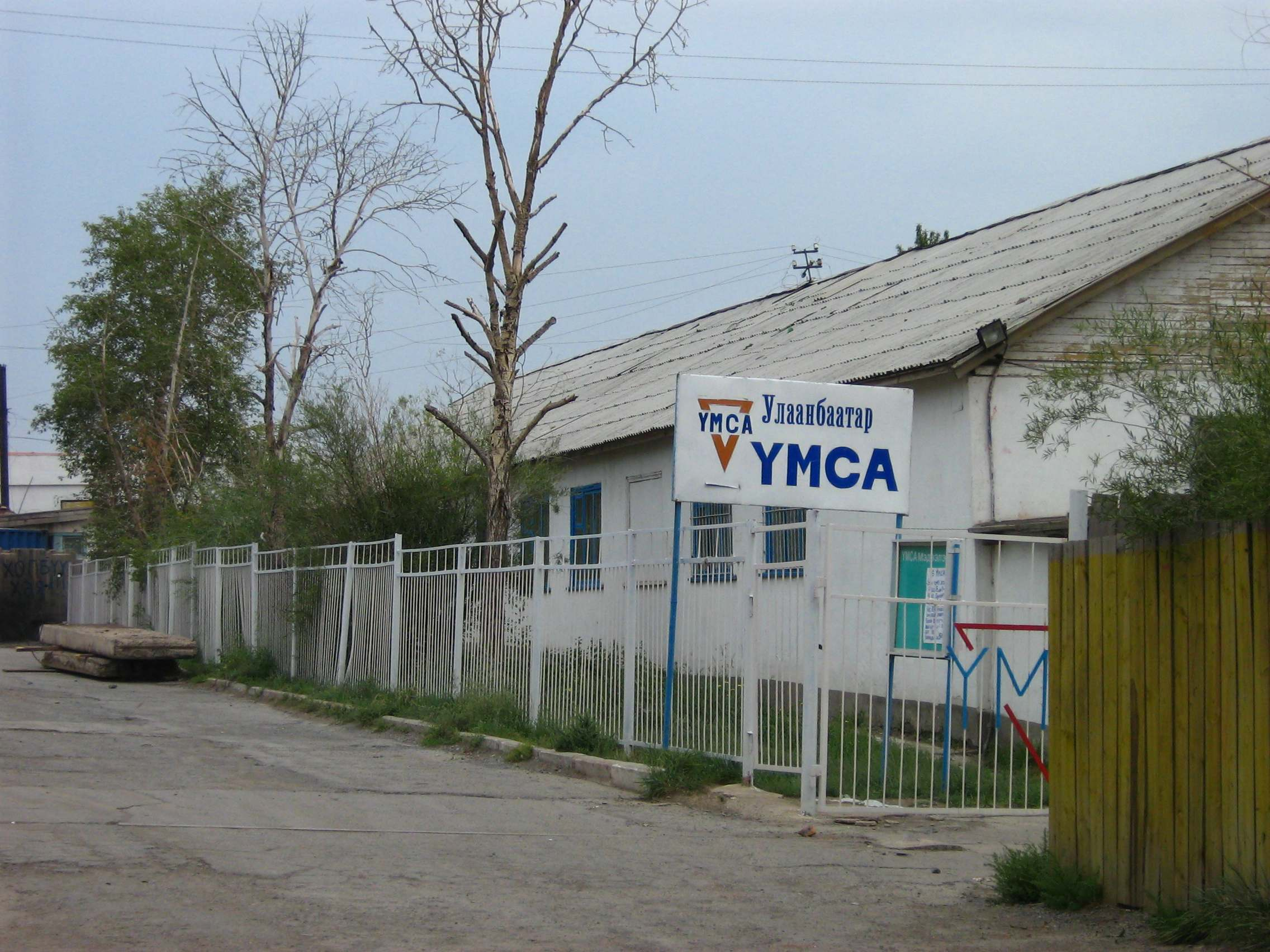
A YMCA in Ulaanbaatar, Mongolia in August 2007

In 2002, the World Council in Oaxtepec, Morelos, Mexico, called for a peaceful solution to the Middle East crisis. On 12 July 2010, YMCA of the USA rebranded its name to the popular nickname "The Y" and revised the iconic red and black logo to create five coloured versions. Today, YMCAs are open to all, regardless of ability, age, culture, ethnicity, gender, race, religion, sexual orientation and socioeconomic background.

During the 19th World Council meeting in 2018 in Chiang Mai, Thailand, Carlos Sanvee from Togo became the first African and current Secretary General of World YMCA. During the same World Council meeting, Patricia Pelton from Canada emerged as the first female President of World YMCA.

YMCA's 175th anniversary in 2019 was celebrated with a global gathering of the organization's young leaders at ExCeL London from 4 to 7 August, with 3,200 people from 100 countries. The event celebrated youth leadership, and elevated the United Nations Sustainable Development Goals. It was attended by guests including Jayathma Wickramanayake on behalf of Office of the Secretary-General's Envoy on Youth, and María Fernanda Espinosa, the President of the United Nations General Assembly.

==== London Central YMCA building ====
In December 2024 the Central YMCA building, on London's Great Russell Street and recognized as the first YMCA in the world since its founding in 1844, was sold. The decision, attributed by the YMCA to high maintenance costs and demographic changes, was met with widespread dismay from members and the broader community. A petition to reverse the closure garnered thousands of signatures on Change.org, reflecting the significant public outcry. The Central YMCA had long been a cornerstone of the community, boasting extensive facilities including a swimming pool, sauna, steam room, exercise studios, and a cycling studio, making it the largest YMCA premises in London. However, after an injunction application by a club member failed, the Central YMCA building closed on 7 February 2025. The YMCA said "The Central YMCA has not shut down – we have announced the sale of our Club site at 112 Great Russell Street only. Our operations, including our education services and programmes across the country, will still continue and we still have CYMCA club sites at Kings Cross and Moorgate."

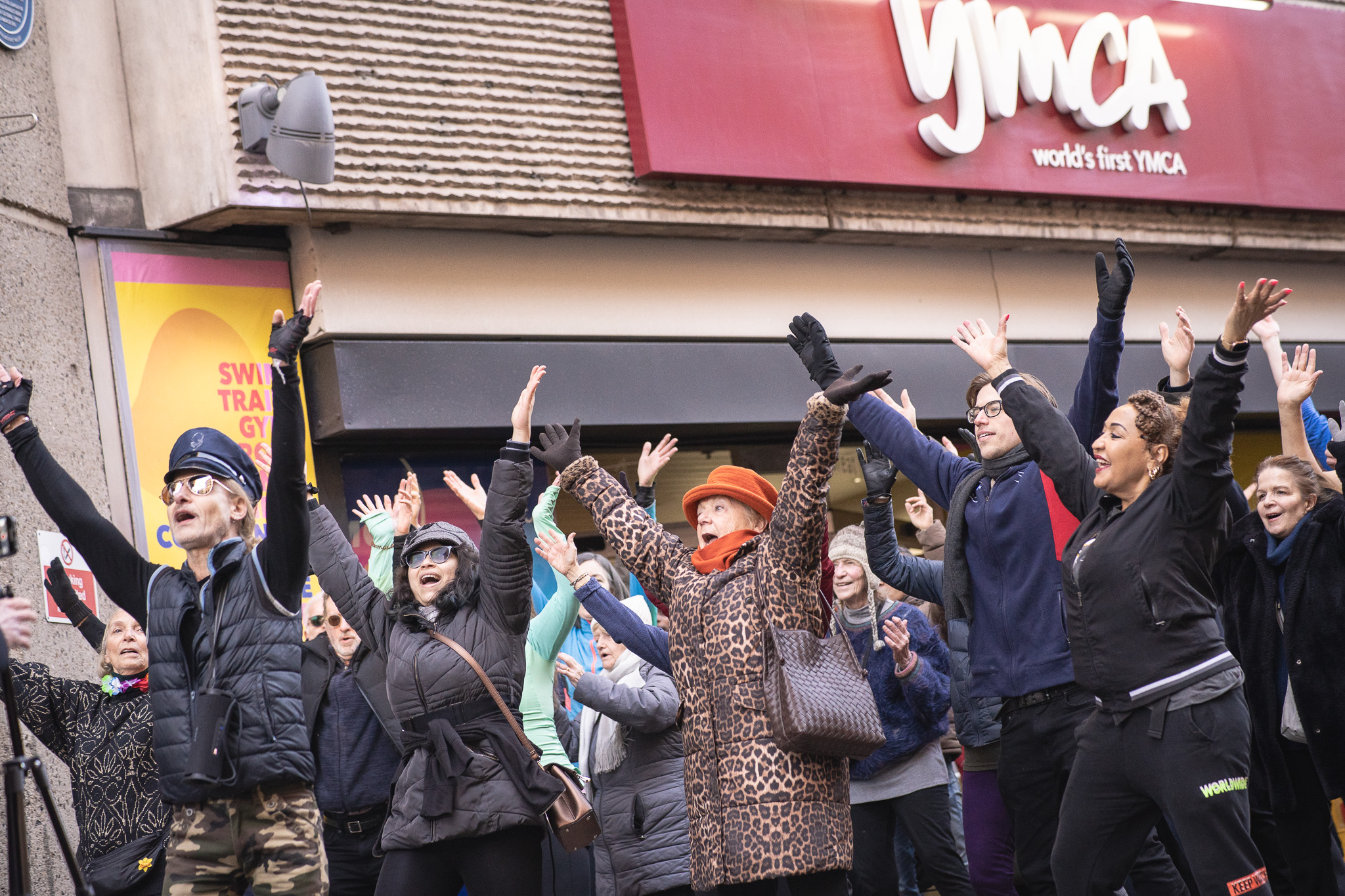
Closure of world's first YMCA protested by Village People flash mob in 2025

The closure sparked criticism toward Criterion Capital, the property company which acquired the site, which already had a Criterion-owned Zedwell hotel in the basement. Conservation areas surround the building on all sides, but the building itself is excluded and may be demolished or redeveloped. Campaigners alleged that the company's focus on commercial redevelopment conflicted with the YMCA's historical mission of providing affordable and inclusive services for the community. The "Save the YMCA" campaign emerged as a grassroots effort to halt the closure, with supporters calling for a six-month pause to explore sustainable solutions for retaining the facilities. The campaign drew media attention, with coverage from BBC News and other outlets, highlighting concerns about the loss of vital community resources in central London.

Critics of the decision have argued that the sale of the premises to Criterion Capital or its affiliates undermines the YMCA's legacy, suggesting that the closure represents a broader trend of prioritizing private development over public good. Campaigners have urged Criterion Capital and its leadership, including the Aziz family, to collaborate on preserving the facilities, emphasizing the potential to reimagine the site while maintaining its original purpose of serving the community. A Save the ExCYMCA campaign was established by YMCA members hoping that the building could revert to active YMCA use secured "Asset of Community Value" status for it, and in May 2025 submitted a listing application to Historic England. Asif Azis has said that "we did not acquire YMCA to close it down".

== Global structure ==
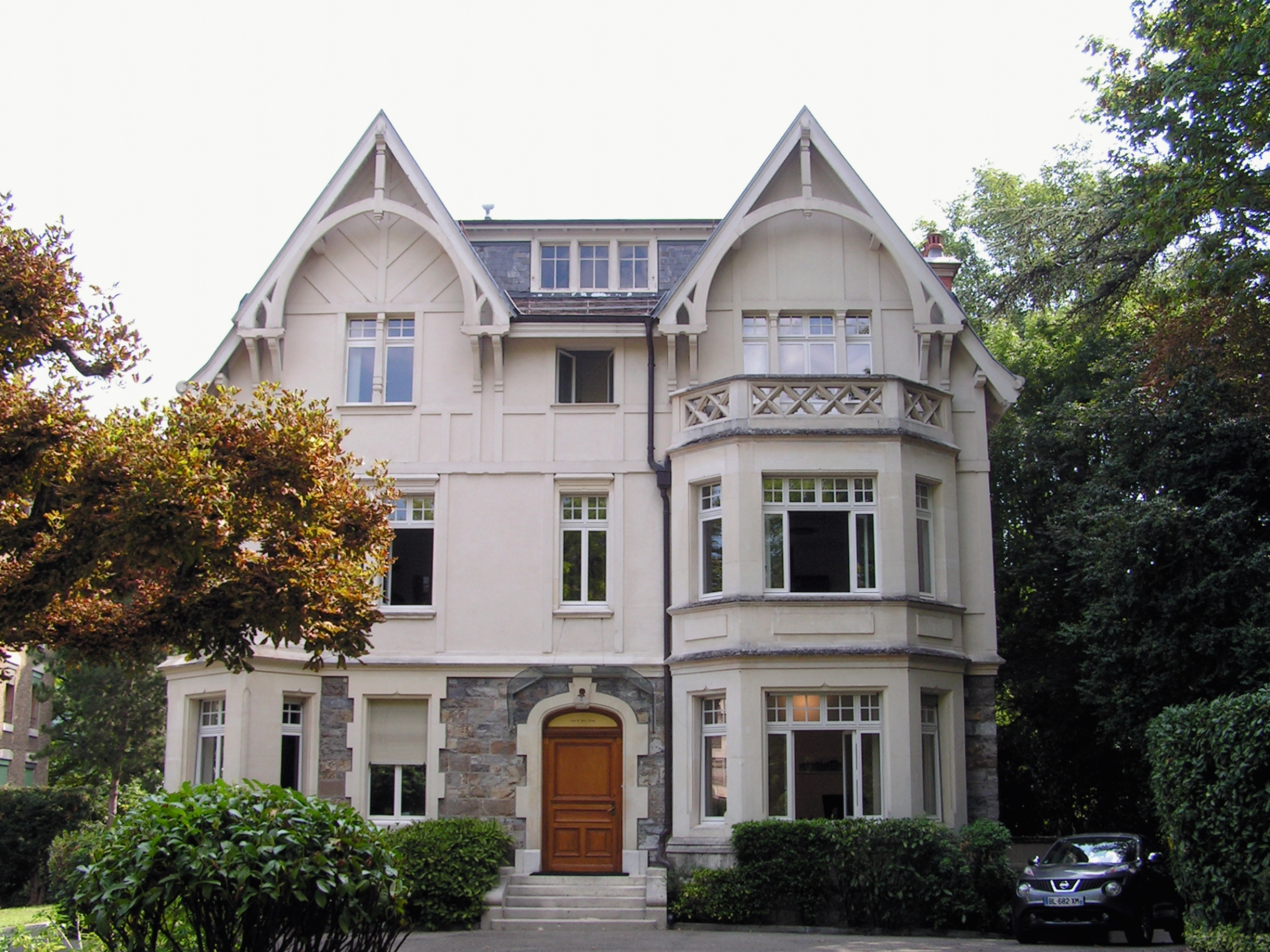
Former head office in Geneva

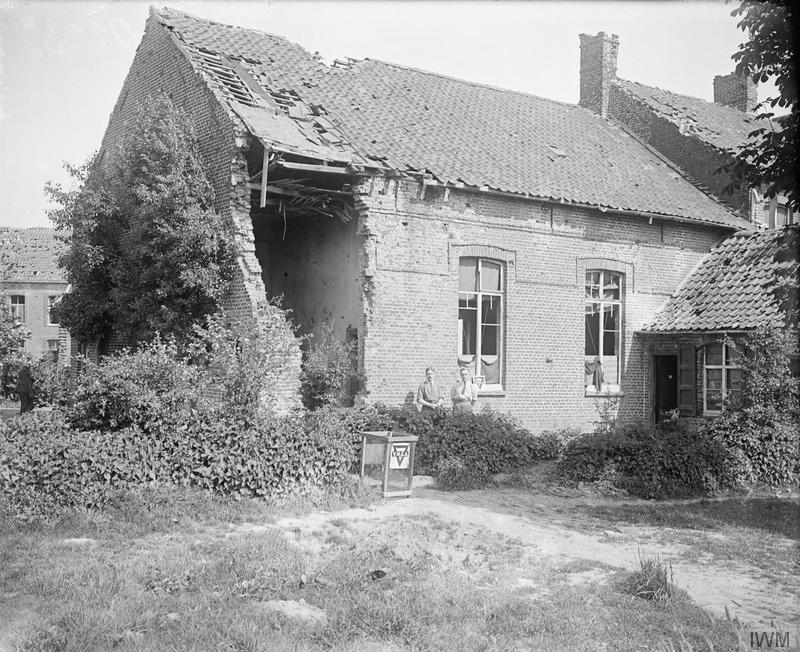
A YMCA at the Western Front during World War I in September 1914

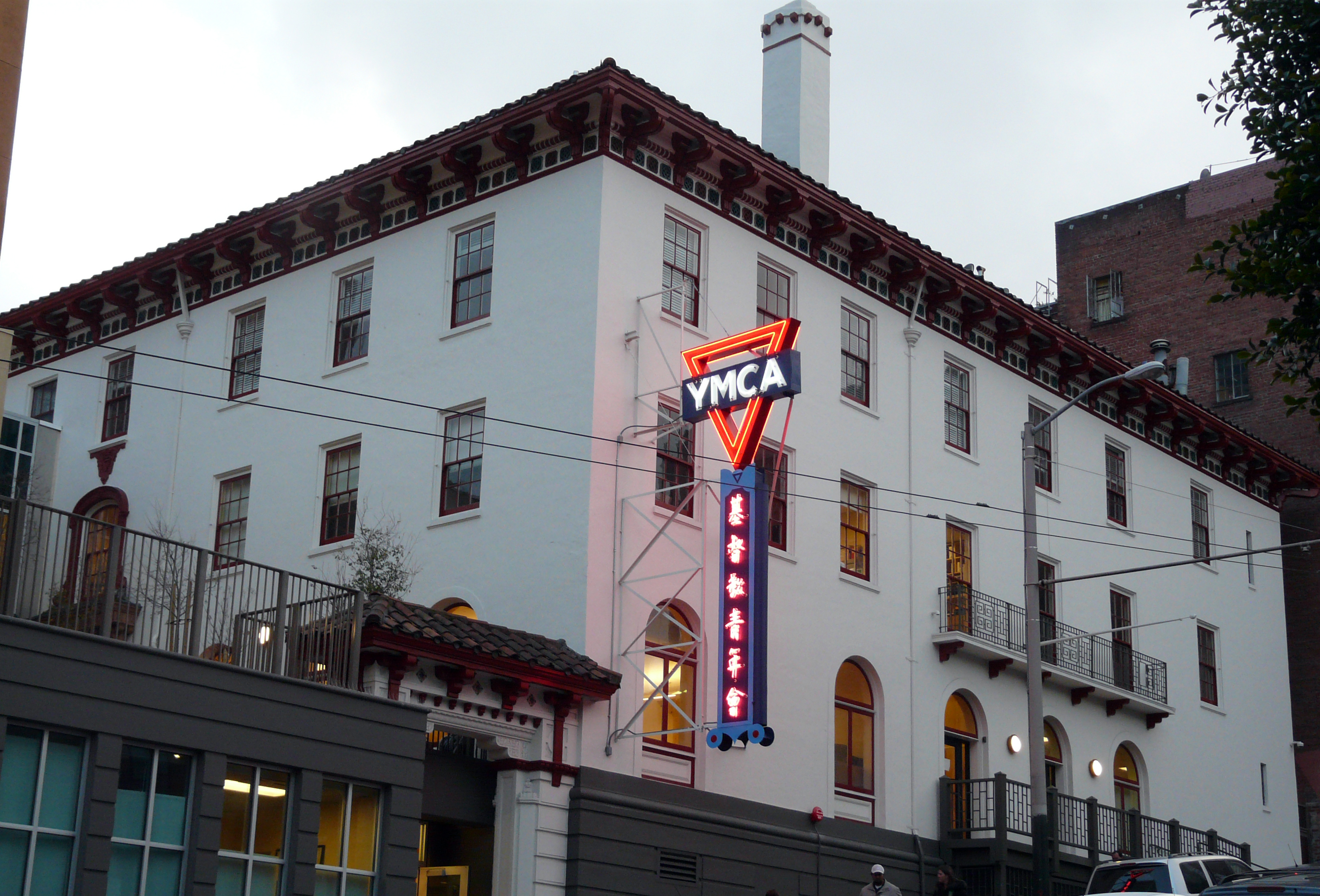
A YMCA in the Chinatown section of San Francisco

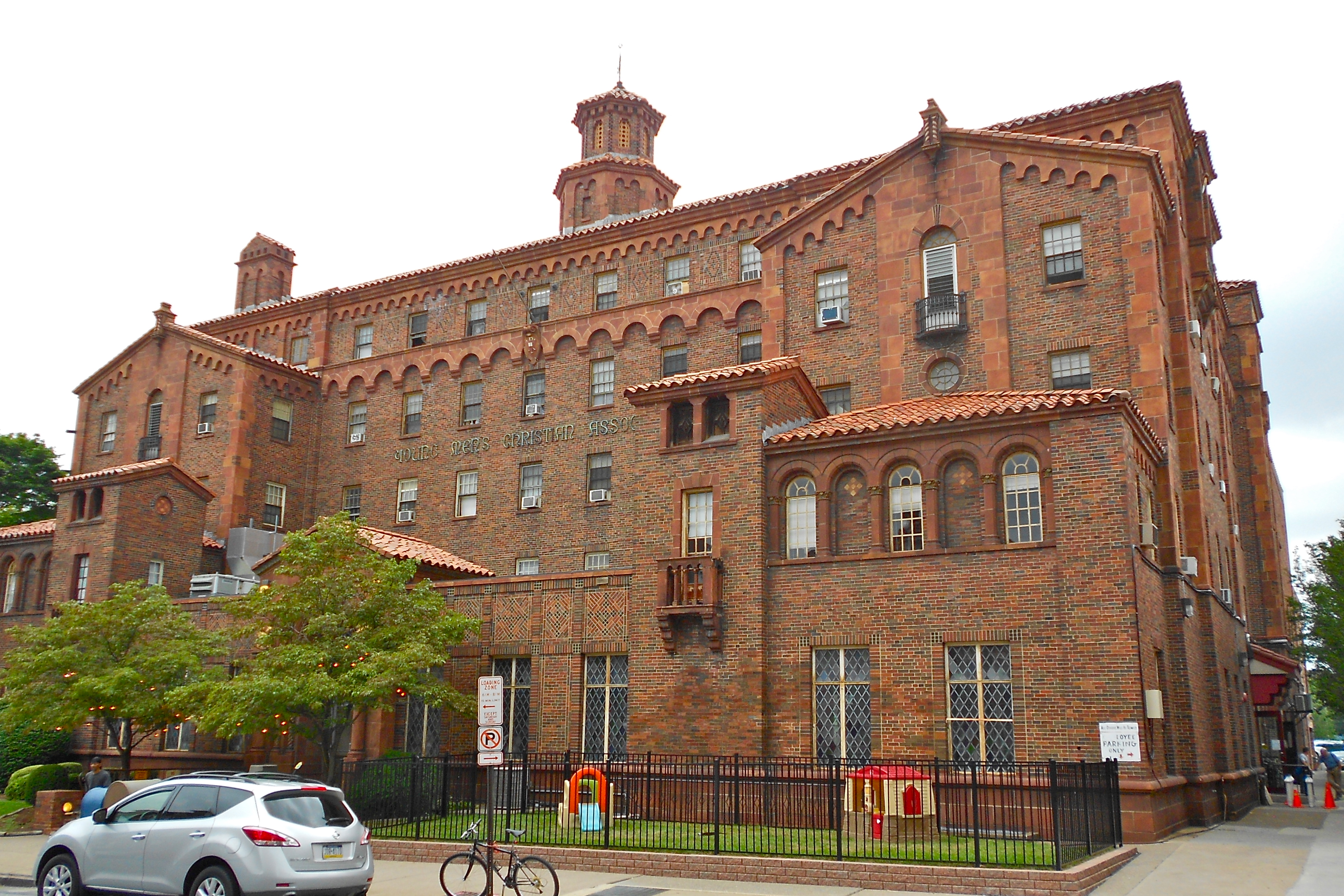
A YMCA in Harrisburg, Pennsylvania

The YMCA organization has its head office in Vernier, Switzerland, where it moved to from Geneva in 2020. The organization had been based in Geneva beginning in 1878. From 1995 to 2020 the head office was at 12 Clos Belmont, a villa listed as a historic site by the Canton of Geneva.

A federated model of governance has created a diversity of YMCA programmes and services, with YMCAs in different countries and communities offering vastly different programming in response to local community needs. Financial support for local associations is derived from programme fees, membership dues, community chests, foundation grants, charitable contributions, sustaining memberships, corporate sponsors and other funding models used in the charitable sector.

YMCA globally operates on a federation model with each independent local YMCA affiliated with its national organization, known as a National Council. The national organizations, in turn, are affiliated to both an Area Alliance, including Europe, Asia Pacific, the Middle East, Africa, Latin America and the Caribbean, Mexico, the United States, and Canada, and the World YMCA. The World YMCA is the highest affiliation body. Each local, national and regional YMCA is independent of each other, but local, regional and international cooperation, partnerships and collaborations are part of the organizations work. Each National Council is led by a National General Secretary, a role that similar to that of a CEO. At each stage of the affiliation process, there are usually membership fees paid by local YMCAs to the central organization.

Ever since the first World Conference in August 1855, in Paris, the World YMCA has convened a World Conference, later renamed the World Council, every three to four years and is YMCA's highest decision making forum. Every National Council sends a delegation who hold a number of votes, which are dependent on the financial turnover of that National Council. The World Council is "responsible for setting the policies and direction of the World YMCA, electing its Officers and Executive Committee, evaluating the work of the last four years, and deliberating on priorities for the next quadrennium".

The most recent World Council took place in 2022 in Aarhus, Denmark, and the 21st World Council is scheduled for July 2026 in Toronto.

== Activities and services ==
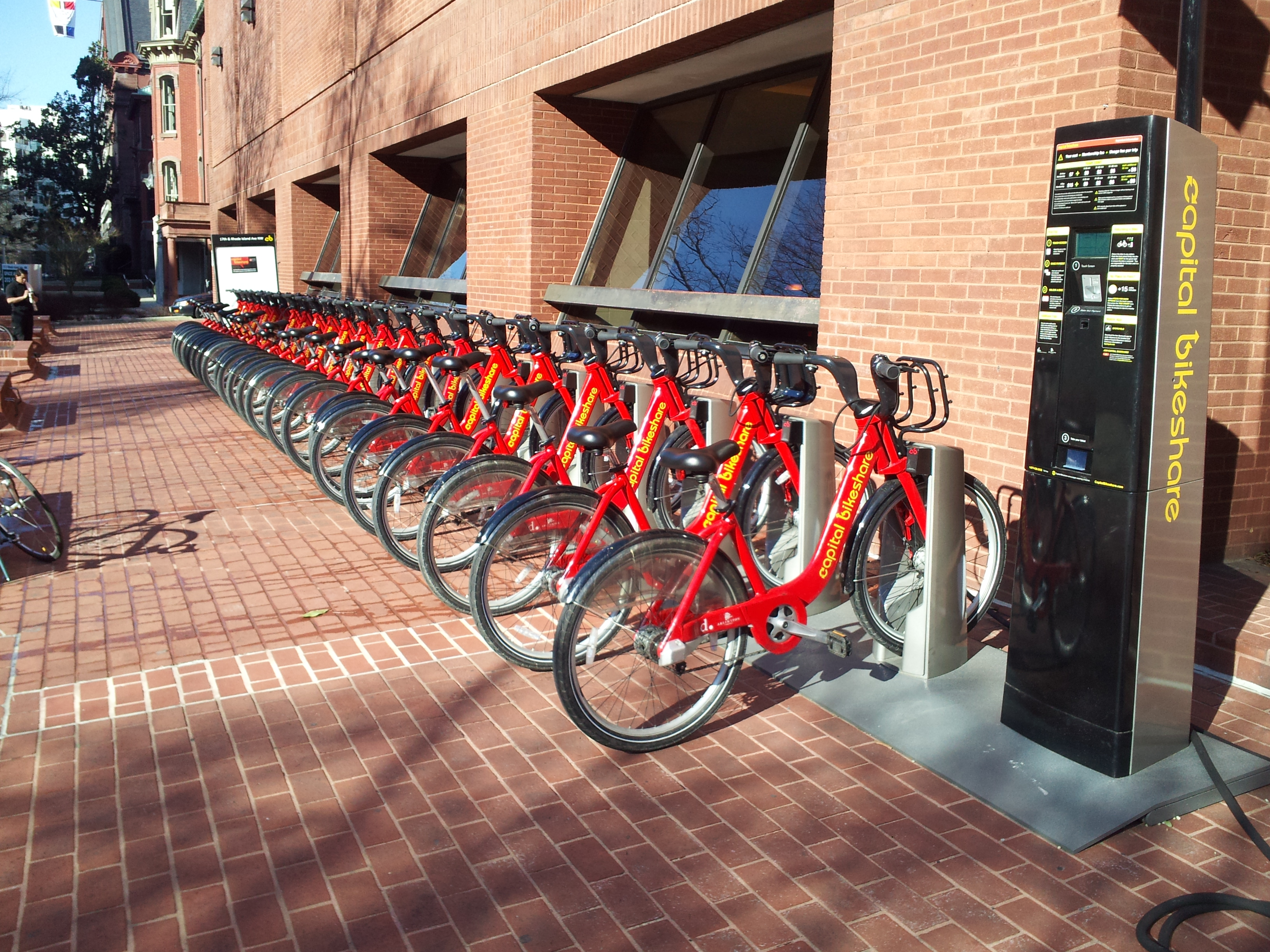
A YMCA in Washington, D.C.

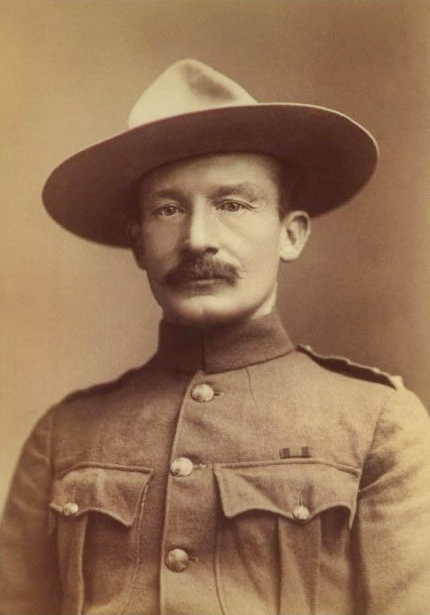
Baden Powell

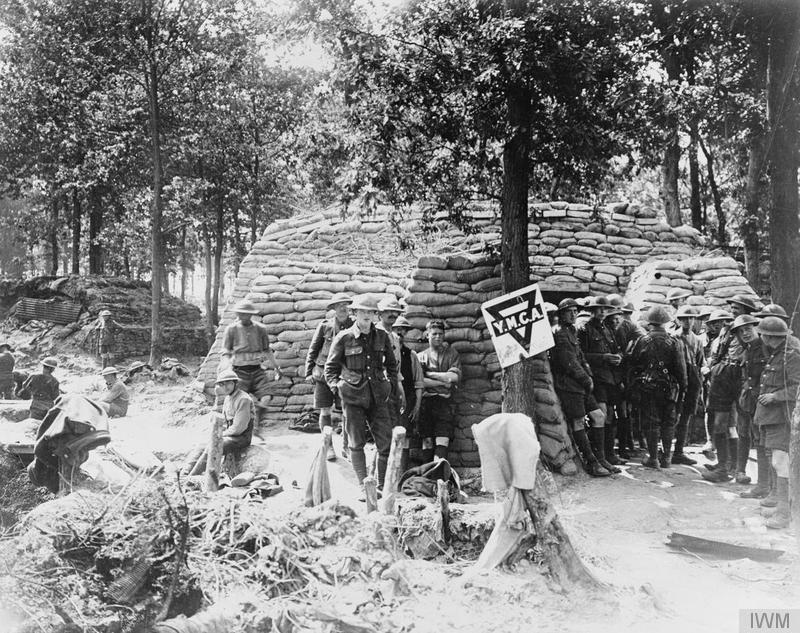
A YMCA at the Western Front

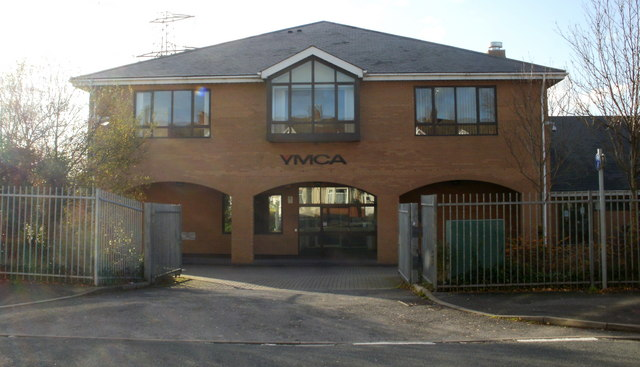
A YMCA in Newport, Wales

=== Accommodation ===
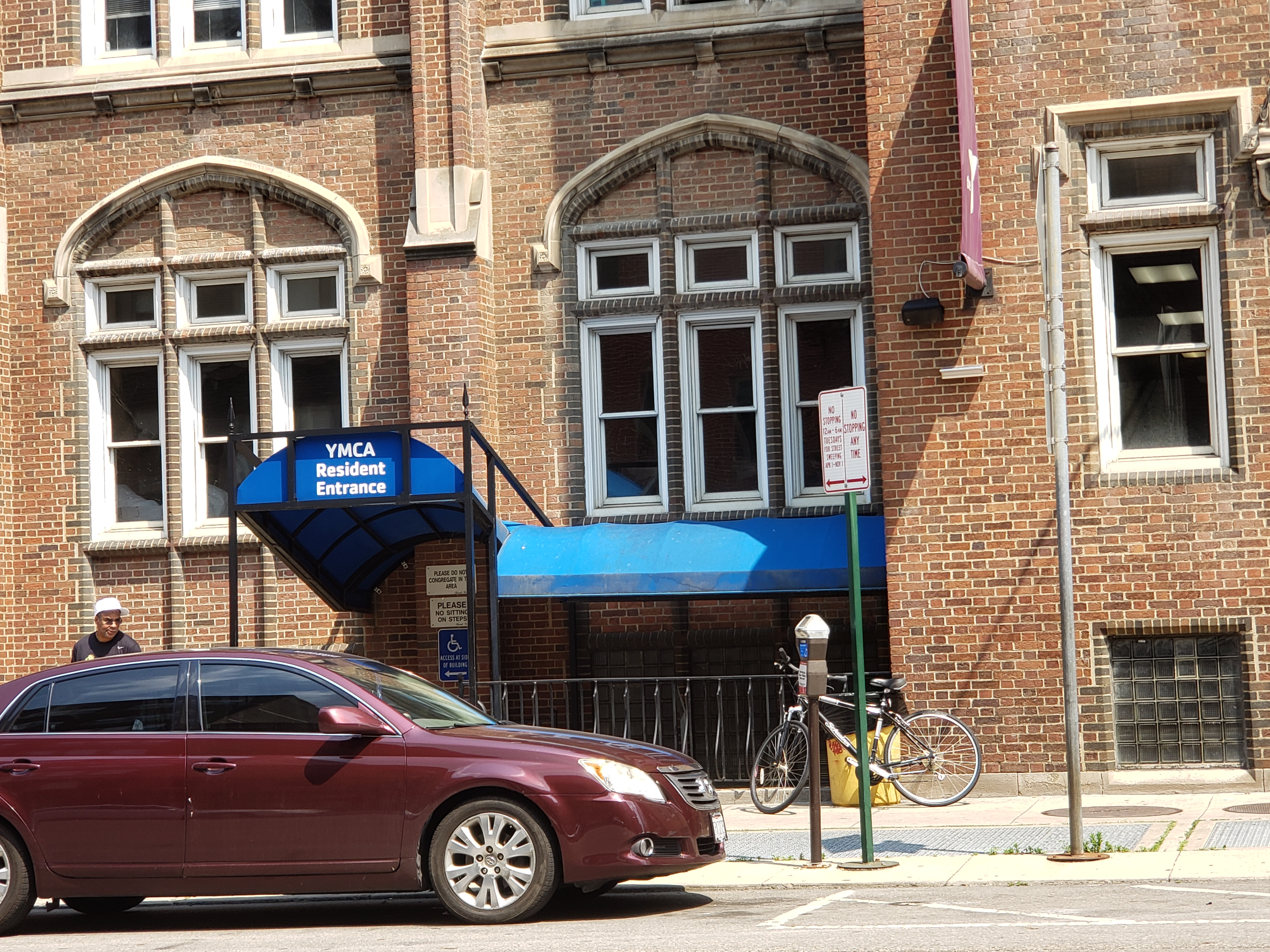
A YMCA with residential housing in Downtown Columbus, Ohio in 2021

YMCAs around the world offer various types of accommodation. In some places, this takes the form of budget accommodation available to the public such as youth hostels, or hotels, which, in turn, generate income for other charitable activities. In England and Wales, YMCAs offer supported accommodation for vulnerable and homeless young people.

Until the late 1950s, YMCAs in the United States were built with hotel-like rooms called residences or dormitories. These rooms were built with the young men in mind coming from rural America and many foreign-born young men arriving to the new cities. The rooms became a significant part of American culture, known as an inexpensive and safe place for a visitor to stay in an unfamiliar city (as, for example, in the 1978 Village People song "Y.M.C.A."). In 1940, there were about 100,000 rooms at YMCAs, more than any hotel chain. By 2006, YMCAs with residences had become relatively rare in the US, but many still remain.

=== Arts and humanities ===
YMCAs offer classes in the visual arts, including ceramics, drawing, painting, and photography, the performing arts, including music, dance, and poetry, and literature, including reading, storytelling, and public readings. These programs are not offered at each YMCA but the ones who have same to offer these programs give a benefit to their communities to give children a safe place to go to enjoy such activities.

=== Camping ===
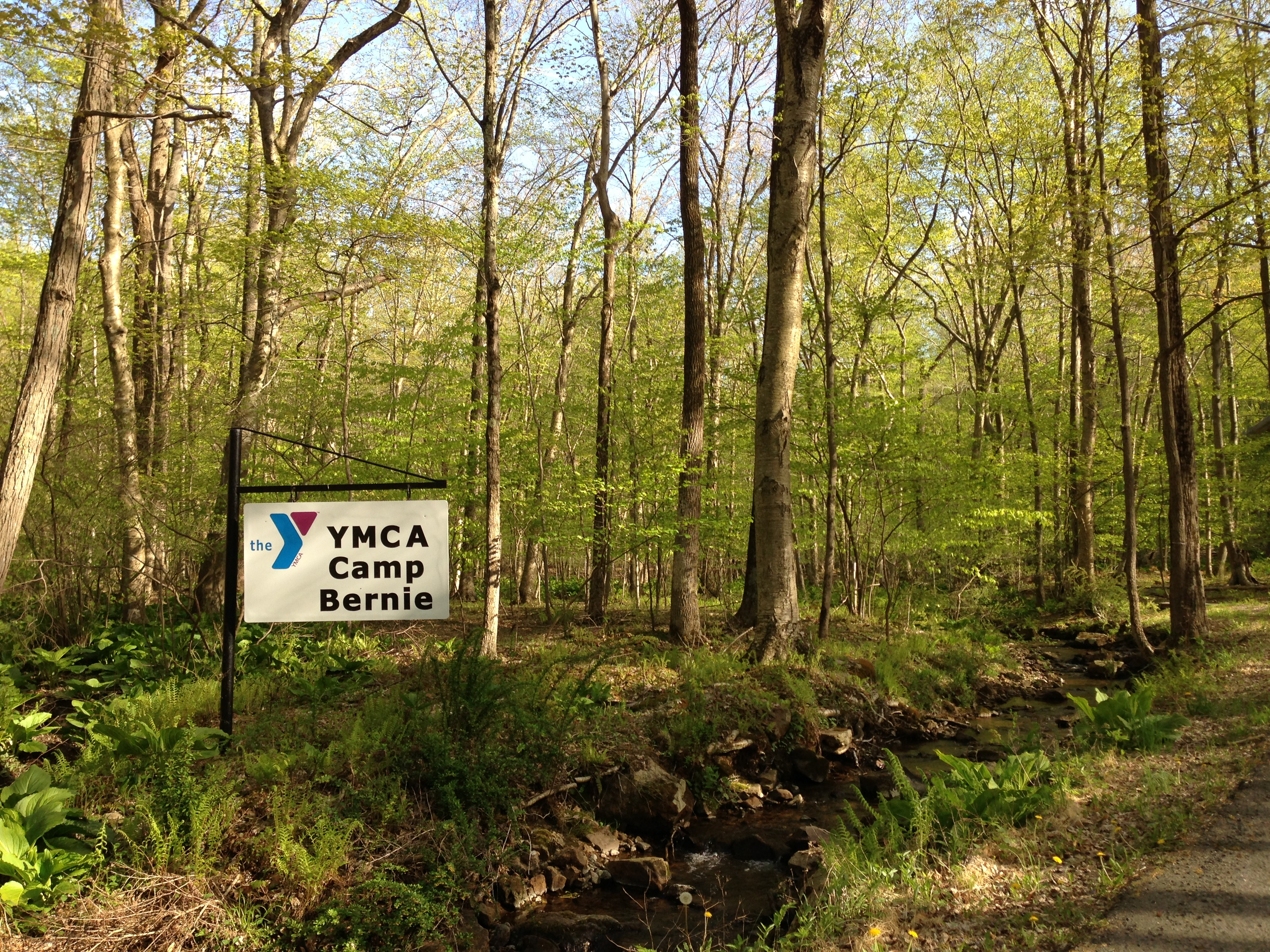
YMCA Camp Bernie

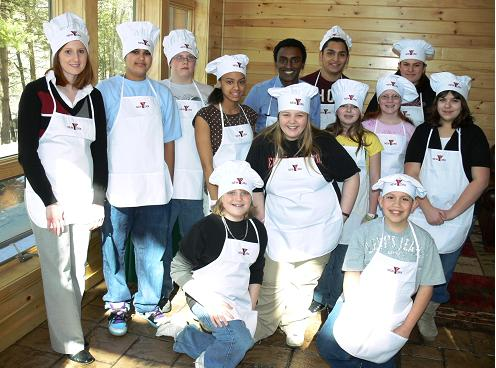
A YMCA camp in Huguenot, New York

YMCA camping began in 1885 when Camp Baldhead (later known as Camp Dudley) was established by G.A. Sanford and Sumner F. Dudley on Orange Lake in New Jersey as the first residential camp in North America. The camp later moved to Lake Champlain near Westport, New York.

Camping also had early origins in YMCA movement in Canada with the establishment in 1889 of Big Cove YMCA Camp in Merigomish, Nova Scotia.

=== Children's and family programs ===
YMCAs offer child care, including supervised space for infants, toddlers, preschoolers, and school-age children to stay and play while parents enjoy a workout. YMCA staff members are trained to ensure the safety and well-being of the children in their care so that parents can confidently pursue their fitness goals or take part in the various YMCA programs.

Family programs include family nights, parent-child classes, and different events put on by the YMCA. YMCA's parent/child programs, conducted under YMCA's Y-Guides program, provides structured opportunities for fellowship, camping, and community-building activities, including craft-making and community service, for several generations of parents and children from kindergarten through eighth grade.

YMCA after-school programs are geared towards providing students with a variety of recreational, cultural, leadership, academic, and social skills for development.

=== Education and academia ===
Multiple colleges and universities have historically had connections to YMCA. Springfield College, of Springfield, Massachusetts, was founded in 1885 as an international training school for YMCA Professionals, while one of the two schools that eventually became Concordia University—Sir George Williams College—started from night courses offered at the Montreal YMCA. Northeastern University began out of a YMCA in Boston, and Franklin University began as YMCA School of Commerce. San Francisco's Golden Gate University traces its roots to the founding of YMCA Night School on 1 November 1881.

Detroit College of Law, now the Michigan State University College of Law, was founded with a strong connection to the Detroit, Michigan YMCA. It had a 99-year lease on the site, and it was only when it expired that the college moved to East Lansing, Michigan. Youngstown State University traces its roots to the establishment of a law school by the local YMCA in 1908. The Nashville School of Law was YMCA Night Law School until November 1986, having offered law classes since 1911 and the degree of Juris Doctor since January 1927. YMCA pioneered the concept of night school, providing educational opportunities for people with full-time employment. Many YMCAs offer ESL programs, alternative high school, day care, and summer camp programs.

In India, YMCA University of Science and Technology of Faridabad was founded in 1969. It offers various programs related to science and engineering. During the 1880s, the Cleveland YMCA began to offer day and evening courses to students who did not otherwise have access to higher education. The YMCA program was reorganized in 1906 as the Association Institute, and this in turn was established as Fenn College in 1929. In 1964, Fenn College became a state college named Cleveland State University.

American high school students have a chance to participate in YMCA Youth and Government, wherein clubs of children representing each YMCA community convene annually in their respective state legislatures to "take over the State Capitol for a day."

American students in Title One public schools are sometimes eligible to join a tutoring program through YMCA called Y Learning. This program is used to help low-income students who are struggling in school complete their homework with help from tutors and receive a snack as well as a safe place to be after school. Y Learning operates under the main mission of bridging achievements gaps and providing essential resources to help underprivileged students thrive in school.

The International Coalition of YMCA Universities brings together universities from all over the world, including Brazil, England, Germany, Hong Kong, India, Mexico, Uruguay, United States, and Venezuela. The universities offer a wide variety of courses on different levels.

=== Health and wellbeing ===
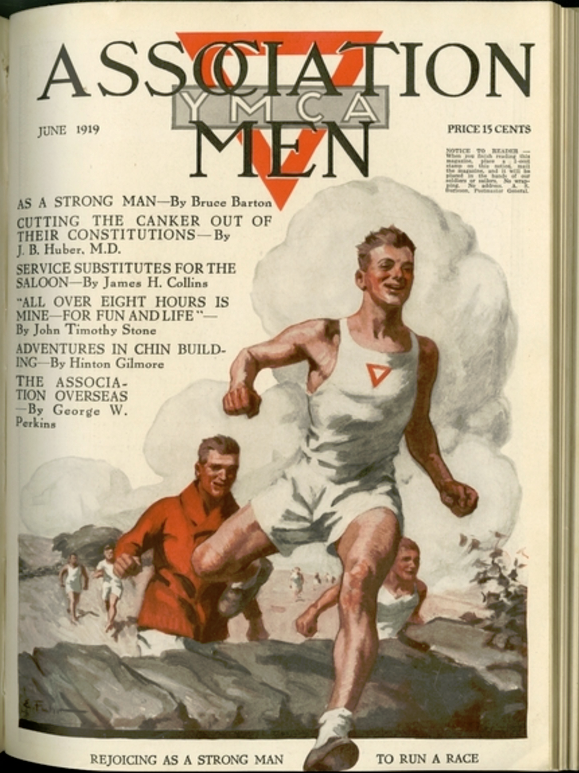
The June 1919 cover of Association Men, a YMCA publication

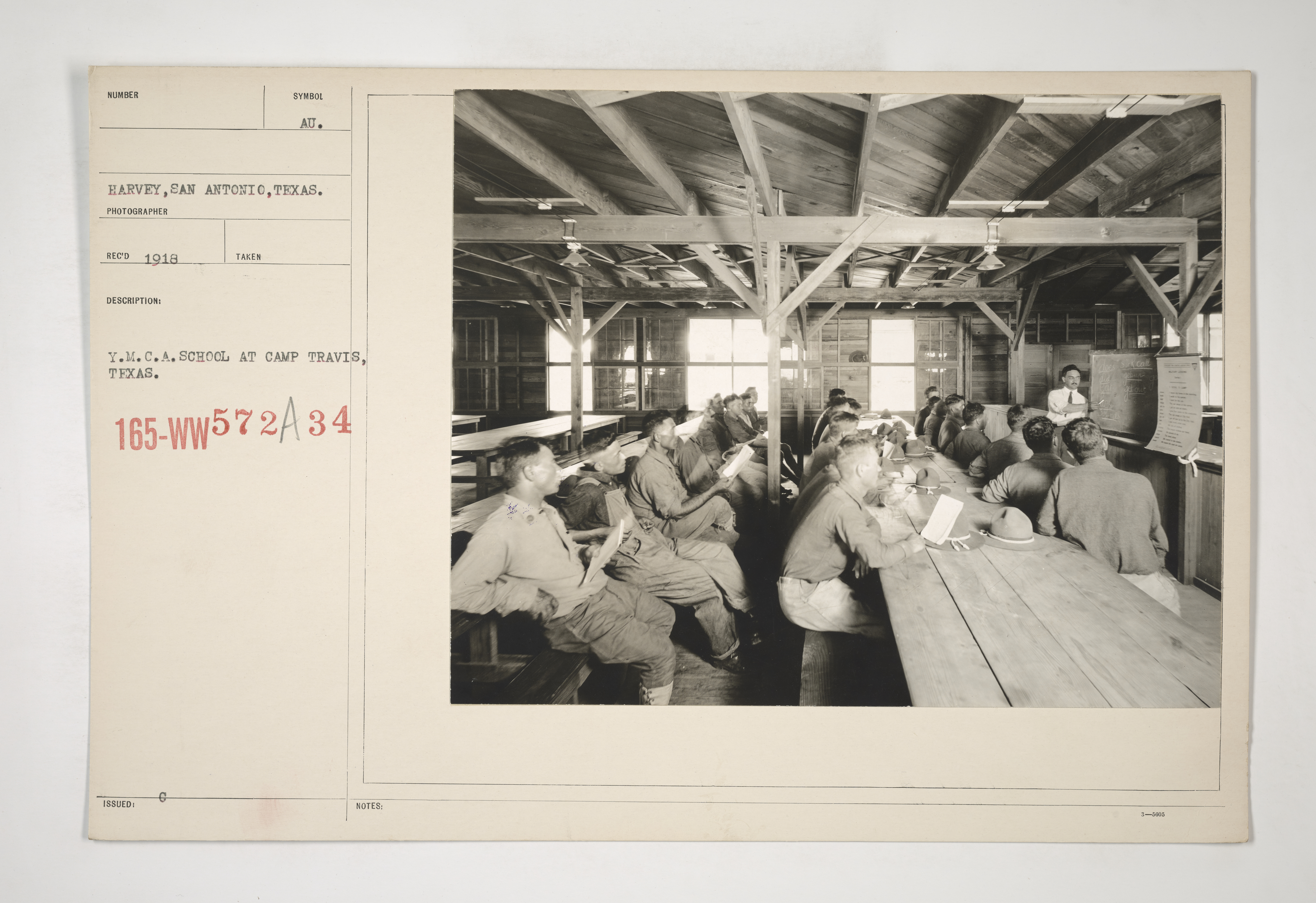
War Relief YMCA

A YMCA library in Charleston, South Carolina

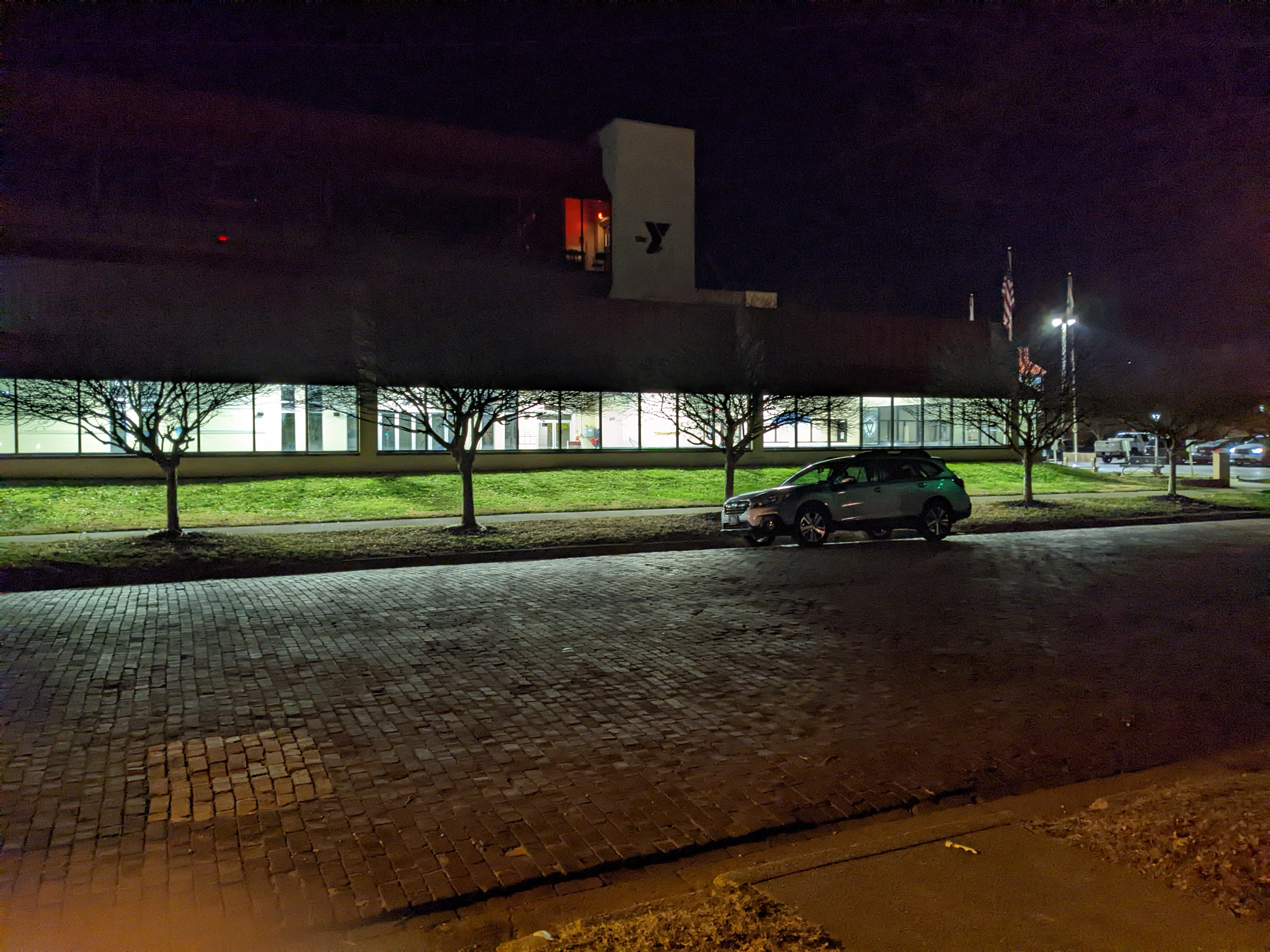
A YMCA in Huntington, West Virginia in 2022

In 1891, James Naismith, a Canadian American, invented basketball while studying at YMCA International Training School in Springfield, Massachusetts (later to be named Springfield College). Naismith had been asked to invent a new game in an attempt to interest pupils in physical exercise. The game had to be interesting, easy to learn, and easy to play indoors in winter.

In 1895, William G. Morgan from YMCA of Holyoke, Massachusetts, invented the sport of volleyball as a slower-paced alternative sport, in which the older YMCA members could participate.

In 1930, Juan Carlos Ceriani from YMCA of Montevideo, Uruguay, invented the sport of futsal, an indoor version of football, having been created in synthesis with the rules of the three indoor sports of handball, basketball and water polo.

YMCA also organizes fitness, wellness, and help and awareness programs. One of the programs is the Diabetes Prevention Program, in which trained staff members help diabetics to make their lives healthier and more active.

=== Publishing ===
YMCA founded YMCA Press publishing house in Russia in 1900. It moved to Paris after World War I, where it focused on providing intellectual and educational works to Russian émigrés. YMCA Press published some of Aleksandr Solzhenitsyn's books while he was imprisoned by the Russian government.

=== Religion ===
The first YMCA included Bible studies, although the organization has generally moved on to a more secular approach to youth work. Around six years after its birth, an international YMCA conference in Paris decided that the objective of the organization should become "Christian discipleship developed through a program of religious, educational, social and physical activities" (Binfield 1973:265).

=== Sports ===
Sports offered at YMCAs include baseball, basketball, gymnastics, football, karate, racquetball, soccer, volleyball, wrestling, and others.

==== Aquatics ====
Aquatics offered at YMCAs range from recreational classes to competitive swimming. Classes are offered for parent-child, preschool, youth, family, teen and adult, arthritics classes, and other water therapies. Certain YMCAs also offer a special Olympic swim class or swim team. CPR and first aid classes are offered to employees and the public. Away from swim classes, individuals can also take water polo lessons, water fitness lessons, or take part in the open swim times where families can swim in a lane to themselves.

==== Basketball ====
In 1891, basketball was invented at the YMCA in Springfield, Massachusetts, by James Naismith, a clergyman, educator, and physician. Naismith was asked to create an indoor "athletic distraction" to keep rowdy youth busy in the cold New England winter months. Luther Gulick (physician), the head of Springfield YMCA gave Naismith two weeks to come up with a game to occupy a particularly incorrigible group. Naismith decided the game had to be physically active, simple to understand and would have minimal physical roughness.

The first contest was played at the International YMCA Training School in December 1891. During those earliest games the school's custodian, "whose antipathy to the students was well known," retrieved successful shots from the baskets – using a ladder. The original game was played with a soccer ball and two peach baskets nailed to the balcony of Springfield YMCA. The game was an immediate hit, although originally the baskets still had their bottoms, and the ball had to be manually retrieved after each score, considerably slowing play. It was mostly a passing game, and dribbling did not become a major part of the game until much later, when the ball was improved to its present form.

Gulick worked with Naismith to spread the sport, chairing the Basketball Committee of the Amateur Athletic Union (1895–1905) and representing the United States Olympic Committee during the 1908 Olympic Games. Naismith and his wife attended the 1936 Summer Olympics when basketball was included for the first time as an Olympic event. For his efforts to increase the popularity of basketball and of physical fitness in general, Gulick was inducted into the Basketball Hall of Fame as a contributor in 1959.

==== Futsal ====
"Futsal" started in 1930 when Juan Carlos Ceriani [fr], a teacher in Montevideo, Uruguay, created a version of indoor football (football is called "soccer" in the United States) for recreation in YMCAs. This new sport was originally developed for playing on basketball courts, and a rule book was published in September 1933. Football was already highly popular in the country and after Uruguay won the 1930 World Cup and gold medals in the 1924 and 1928 Summer Olympics, it attracted even more practitioners. Ceriani's goal was to create a team game that could be played indoor or outdoor but that was similar to football.

The YMCA spread the game immediately throughout South America. It was easily played by everyone, everywhere, and in any weather condition, without any difficulty, helping players to stay in shape all year round. These reasons convinced João Lotufo, a Brazilian, to bring this game to his country and adapt it to the needs of physical education.

==== Gymnastics ====
Gymnastics came to be at the YMCA in 1869. Three YMCAs, those in Boston, San Francisco, and the 23rd Street Branch in New York City, each constructed buildings with gyms inside. These gyms then allowed men to train on the sport of gymnastics. Most of the men who knew gymnastics, however, were circus performers and did not fit the ideas and values of the YMCA. Robert J. Roberts was one of the original circus performers at the Boston YMCA in the 1870s and 1880s, but he was hurt in a fall and could not perform or teach gymnastics. This led him to start the group exercises that exist currently at YMCAs. Even though Robert stopped teaching gymnastics in Boston, the YMCA in Salem, Massachusetts was creating the sport of gymnastics, holding boy/men classes as far back as 1895, where they learned parallel and horizontal bars, German horse, mat exercises, juggling, and weight lifting. They would then train to perform for an audience.

A few years later, gymnastics began to filter out of the YMCA as other group sports, such as basketball and volleyball, became more popular. Gymnastics as we know it today started at the Marblehead/Swampscott YMCA in Massachusetts. Compared to the other YMCAs who were stopping the sport of gymnastics held group classes in their basketball gym. They had to break down their equipment each day until their program was moved to the Salem State College in 1990. Salem State had recently dropped their college team, and the youth director at the YMCA went to see about expanding their program by renting the colleges space. Since then, two of the Marblehead/Swampscott gymnasts have gone on to be named all-American gymnasts and placed in the top five at the National Championships. The team has also placed in the top 10 at several National Championships.

YMCAs around the world offer gymnastics programs for participants of various ages. Equipment includes men's apparatuses such as the pommel horse, parallel bars and high bars, as well as the uneven bars, balance beams, vault systems and trampolines. Many locations provide camps, lessons and teams in gymnastics and cheerleading and tumbling.

==== Racquetball ====
Racquetball is another YMCA-invented sport. Joseph Sobek a tennis, handball and squash player who worked in a rubber manufacturing factory, was dissatisfied with the options for indoor sports in Greenwich, Connecticut. He could not find squash players of his caliber and he did not care particularly for handball, so in 1950 he designed a short, stringed racquet, used a children's toy rubber ball, and created rules for a new game using the handball courts. He called his new sport "paddle rackets". The sport really took off in the 1970s and there are an estimated 15 million players worldwide today.

==== Volleyball ====
Four years after James Naismith invented basketball in Springfield, Massachusetts, in 1895, William G. Morgan, an instructor at YMCA in Holyoke, Massachusetts, wanted to create a game for older gentlemen which had less physical contact. He borrowed a tennis net, raised it 6 feet, 6 inches above the floor, and invented the game of "mintonette", which could be played by a group of any number and involved volleying a large ball over the net. Alfred T Halsted suggested that a better name for the new sport would be "volleyball". In 1912, J. Howard Crocker introduced volleyball to schools and YMCA locations in China. (Note: The Fédération Internationale de Volleyball credits Crocker for introducing volleyball to China via the YMCA. Crocker wrote in a letter than the introduction of volleyball to China occurred in 1912.)

== Regions ==
=== Africa ===
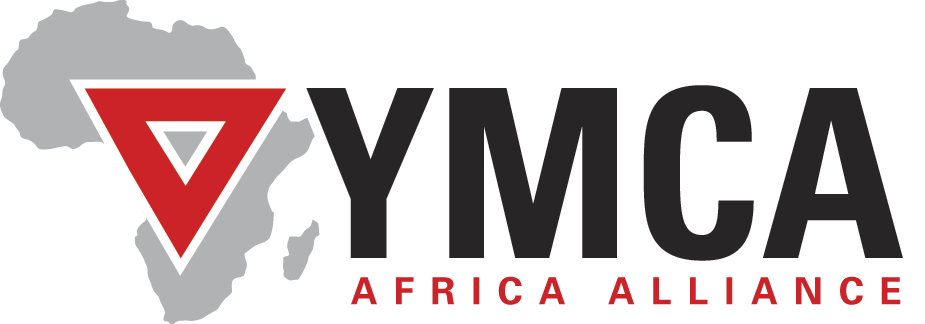
The Africa Alliance of YMCAs logo

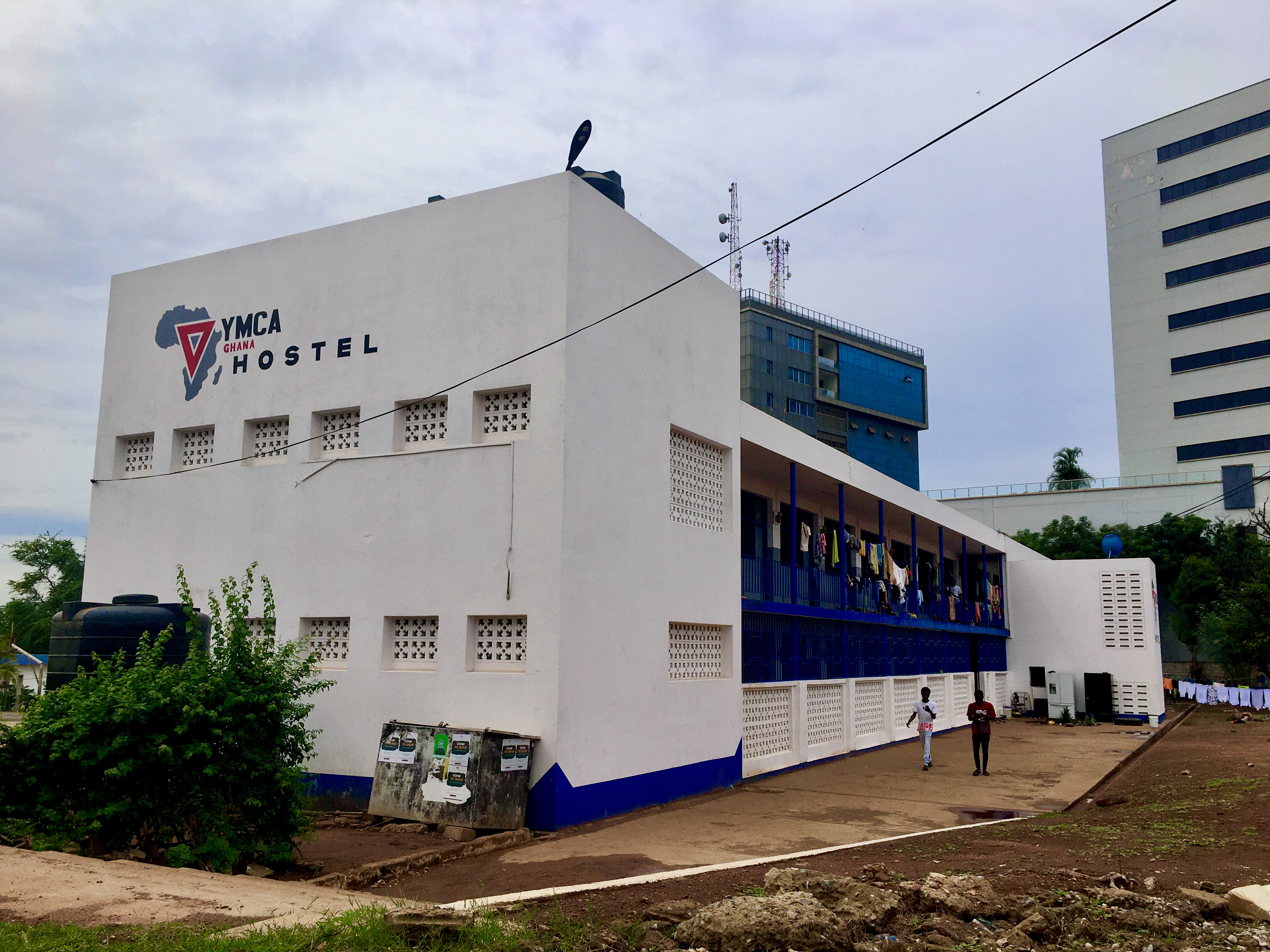
YMCA Accra Ghana in Accra

YMCAs in Africa are united under the Africa Alliance of YMCAs (AAYMCA). The core focus of the organizational work done by the AAYMCA is youth empowerment. AAYMCA is the oldest non-governmental organization network in Africa, reaching approximately five million programme participants. The first YMCA in Africa was established in Liberia in 1881, and the AAYMCA was founded in 1977 as the umbrella body for all national movements on the continent.

AAYMCA collaborates with national movements to conduct research, develop localized as well as continental programming, monitor and evaluate progress, and communicate impact of youth development work undertaken on the continent. From 2015, the Africa Alliance of YMCAs has aligned much of its programmatic work to some of the goals set out by the African Union's Agenda 2063 Development Plan in order to contribute towards the achievement of the ideals envisioned by the African Renaissance.

In 1975, Africa's YMCAs tried to revive the ones in Côte d'Ivoire and Kenya followed by those in Madagascar, Jordan, Suriname, and Angola.

Active YMCA organizations exist in Angola, Cameroon, Côte d'Ivoire, Egypt, Ethiopia, Gambia, Ghana, Kenya, Liberia, Madagascar, Nigeria, Senegal, Sierra Leone, South Africa, Tanzania, Togo, Uganda, Zambia, Zimbabwe, and Namibia. Associate movements exist in Niger, Rwanda, and South Sudan. YMCA organizations are in formation in Malawi.

=== Asia ===
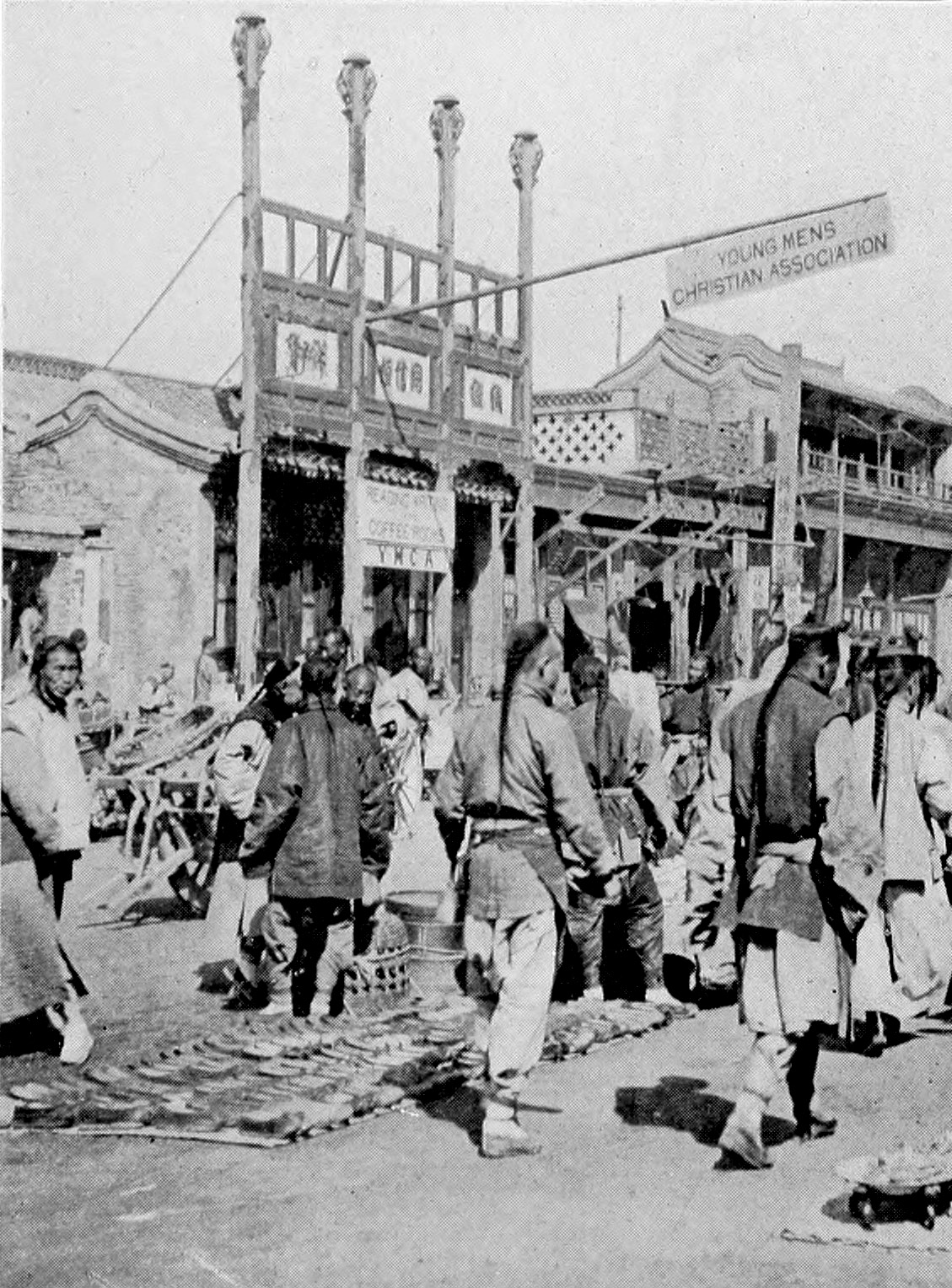
YMCA headquarters in Peking, now Beijing

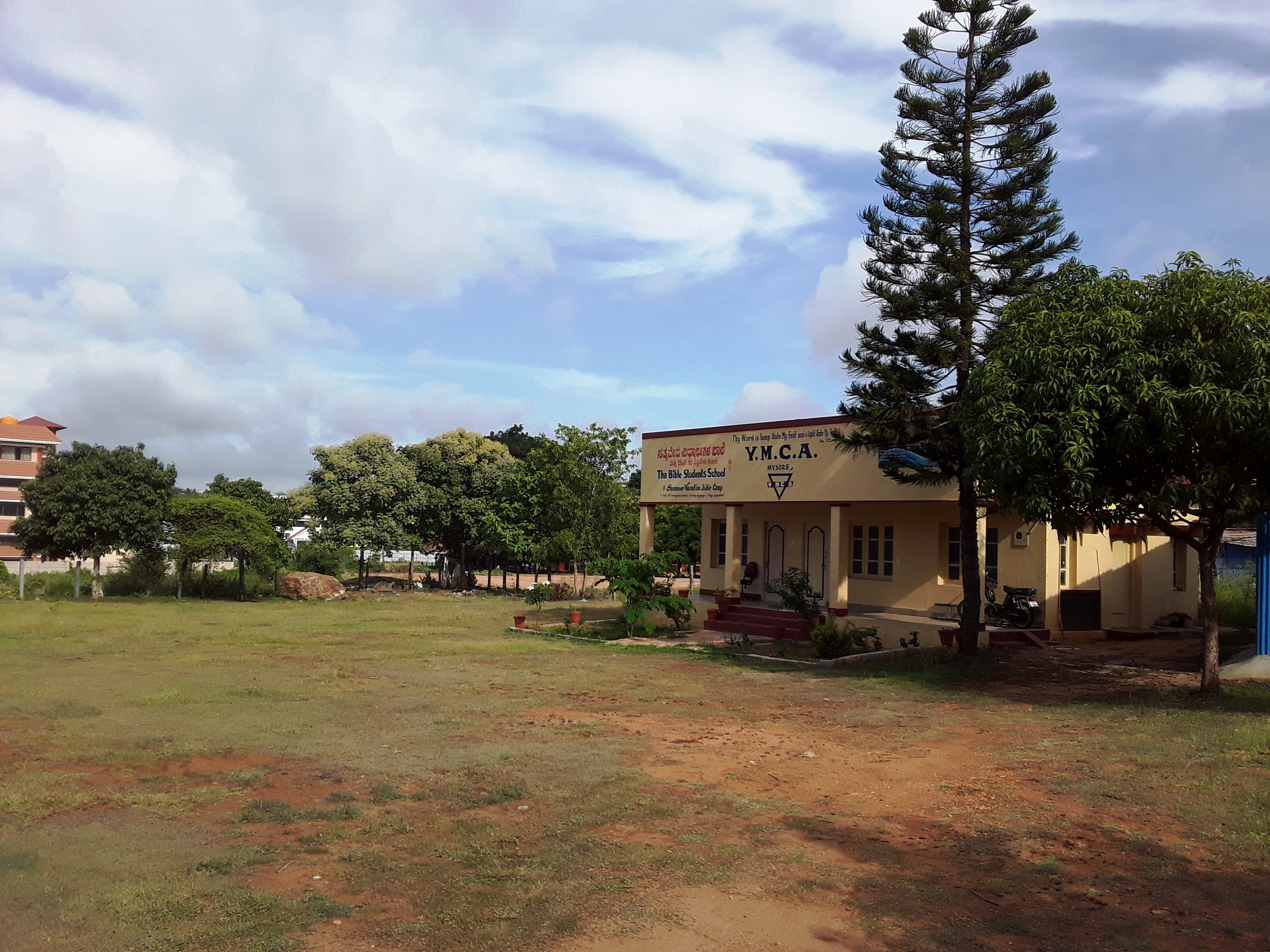
YMCA Mysore in Mysore, India

==== China ====
In 1911, the YMCA appointed J. Howard Crocker to serve as the foreign work secretary to promote physical education based in Shanghai, the headquarters of all YMCA work in China. When he first arrived in China, the YMCA had facilities in large cities, but lacked a nationally co-ordinated effort. In 1911, he arranged the first school for physical education directors in China. With the support of president Yuan Shikai, Crocker toured China to conduct training courses and establish a school for physical education instructors. Shanghai subsequently became the first training centre for physical education directors in China.

==== Hong Kong ====
YMCA Hong Kong was established in 1901, being separated into two separate organizations in 1908, split across linguistic lines: "YMCA of Hong Kong" and "Chinese YMCA of Hong Kong". YMCA Hong Kong headquarters has occupied its current location at 22 Salisbury Road, Tsim Sha Tsui since 1922. YMCA Hong Kong established the College of Continuing Education in 1996 and YMCA of Hong Kong Christian College in 2003.

=== Europe ===
==== Germany ====
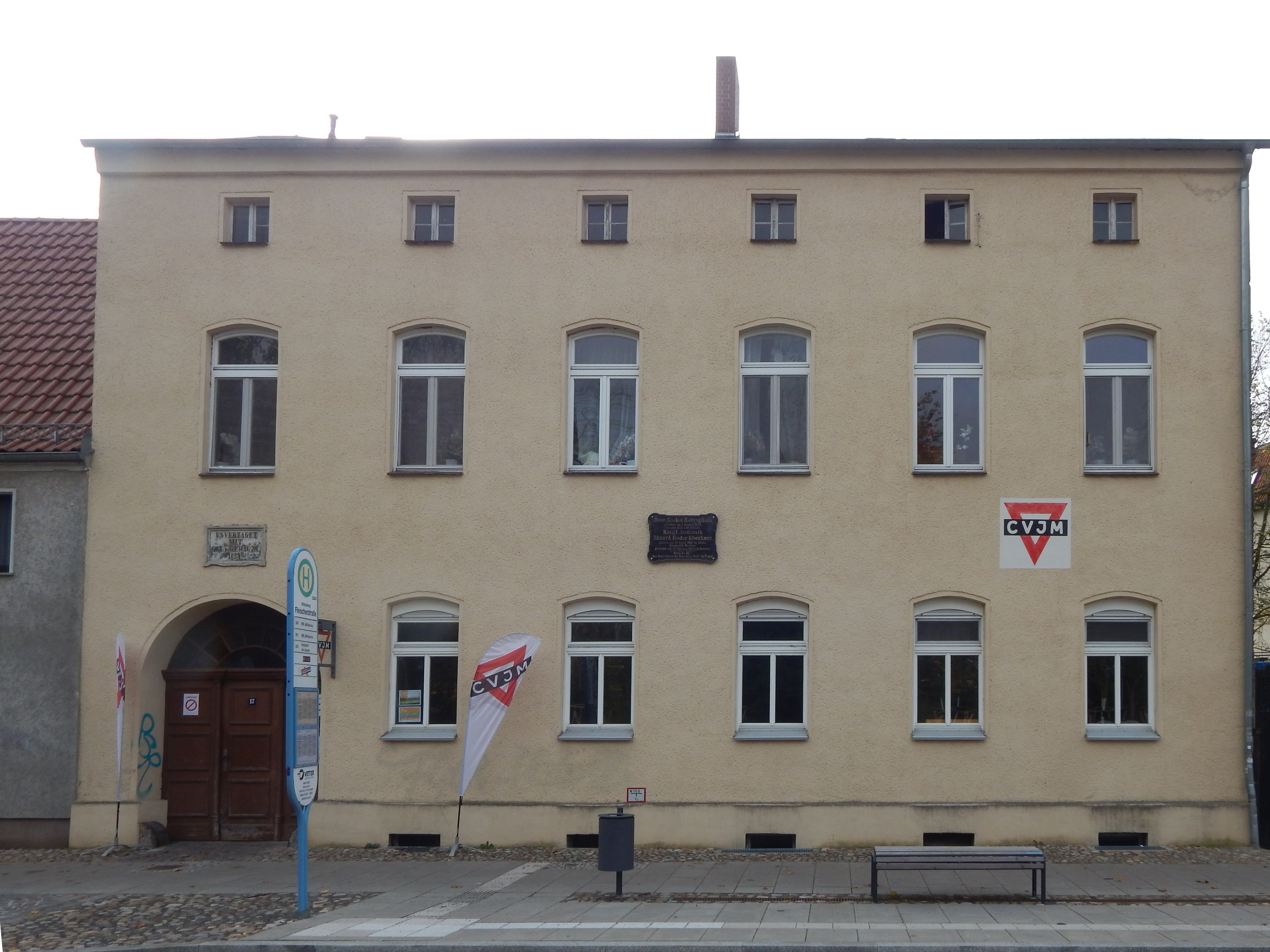
A YMCA in Wittenberg

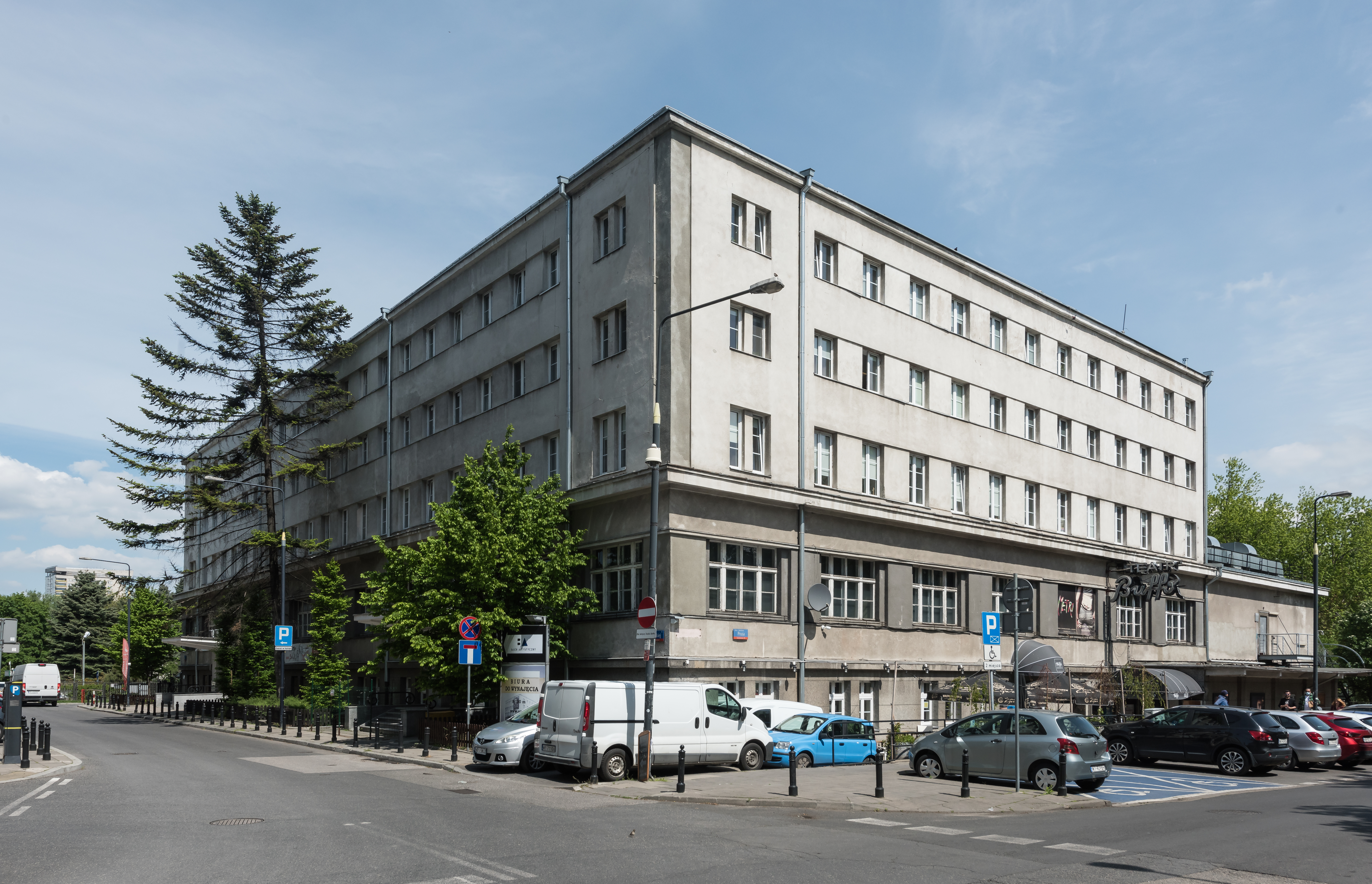
A YMCA in Warsaw

In Germany, as in Austria and Switzerland, YMCA is called CVJM, which stands for Christlicher Verein junger Menschen (Christian Association of Young People). Up until 1985, the organization was called 'Christlicher Verein Junger Männer' (Christian Association of Young Men); the name change reflected its activities being accessible to men and women.

==== Sweden ====
YWCA-YMCA of Sweden in Sweden was established in 1966 following a merger of YMCA of Sweden and the YWCA of Sweden. In 2011, the organization decided to use the term "KFUM Sverige" during promotion where "M" stands for människor ("people") instead of män (men) as it did previously. YWCA-YMCA of Sweden has 40,000 members in 140 local associations. Several Swedish YWCA-YMCA associations have been successful in sports.

==== United Kingdom and Ireland ====
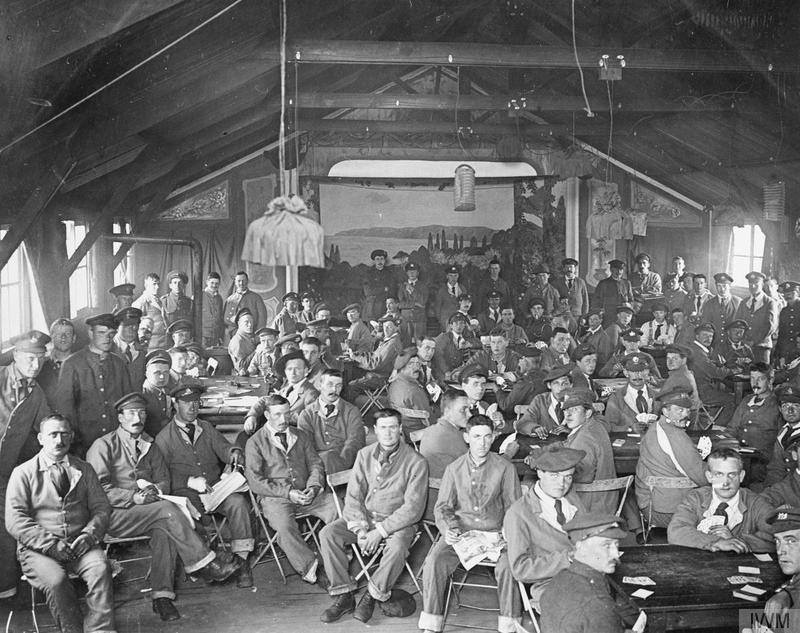
A temporary First World War YMCA on the Western Front, near Rouen, France, 1914

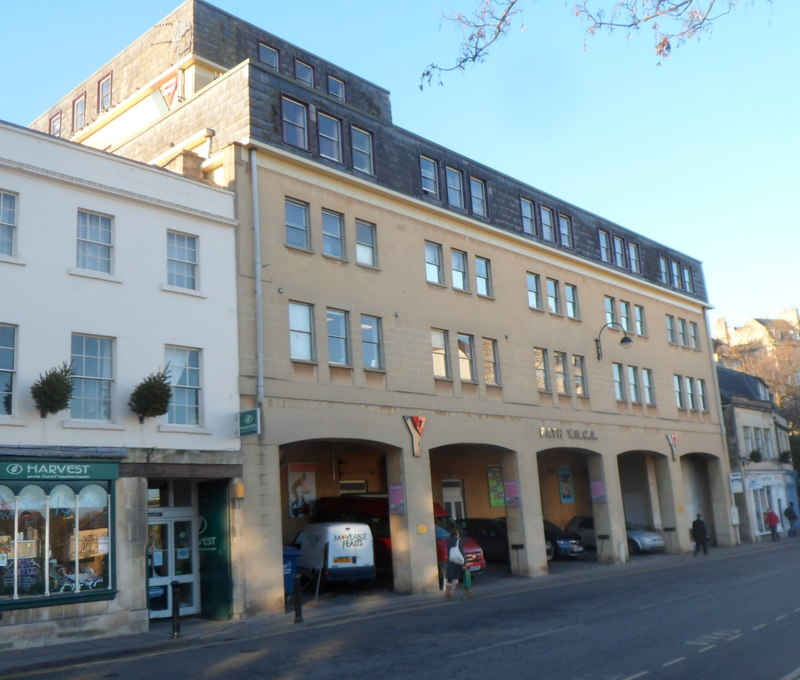
YMCA Bath, one of 86 locations in England and Wales

YMCA in the United Kingdom and Ireland consists of three separate National Councils: England and Wales, Ireland, and Scotland. When YMCAs in Wales joined YMCA England in 2017, the council was renamed YMCA England and Wales.

YMCAs in England and Wales offer supported accommodation for vulnerable and homeless young people, mental health services, youth clubs, sports centres, nursery schools and family support and after school clubs at more than 80 locations. Across England and Wales, YMCA in 2025 supports more than 20,000 residents each year, at 46 locations making it one of the largest providers of safe supported accommodation for young people. At the great majority of sites those living in accommodation are supported by personal, social and educational services. Many YMCAs in England and Wales offer services and facilities to the wider community, among them foodbanks, gyms and swimming pools, conference facilities, cafes, theatres, counselling, chaplaincy and housing advice.

The archive of YMCA England and Wales is housed in the Special Collections section of the University of Birmingham with material from the initial founding of YMCA in London in 1840s to the recent past. The archive of YMCA Scotland is housed at the National Archives of Scotland.

=== Latin America ===
==== Argentina ====
YMCA developed in 1902 in Argentina, where it provided support for physical education teachers. YMCA was most notable in encouraging women's sports in South America, and during the early 1900s, YMCA in Argentina highly promoted basketball, swimming, and track and field. There were many victories for the development of sports in Argentina due to YMCA, such as Frederick Dickens, who served as the director of physical education at the Buenos Aires YMCA. Dickens eventually led the Argentine Olympic delegation to Paris in 1924 and Amsterdam in 1928.

==== Brazil ====
YMCA developed in 1893 in Brazil, and volleyball was deemed appropriate for women from the beginning. Through the encouragement of YMCA, physical educators promoted women's volleyball in schools like Escola Wenceslau Braz and Colégio Sylvio Leite in Rio. Sports clubs even began to organize events for women because of YMCA's influence.

==== Mexico ====
Mexico's first YMCA branch opened in Mexico City in 1902 for the American community. By 1904, there were two more branches in Mexico City and one branch established in Monterrey. In 1907, another branch in Chihuahua was set up and then one YMCA in Tampico. In Mexico, YMCA organized physical activity, individual development, and national progress. There was advertising for YMCA programs that would help young men gain life skills and YMCA also had some activities for women. For example, an excursion to Xochimilco in 1910 featured races for boys and girls and indoor baseball for everyone. YMCA had very little influence on rural Mexico until after the Mexican Revolution.

==== Panama ====
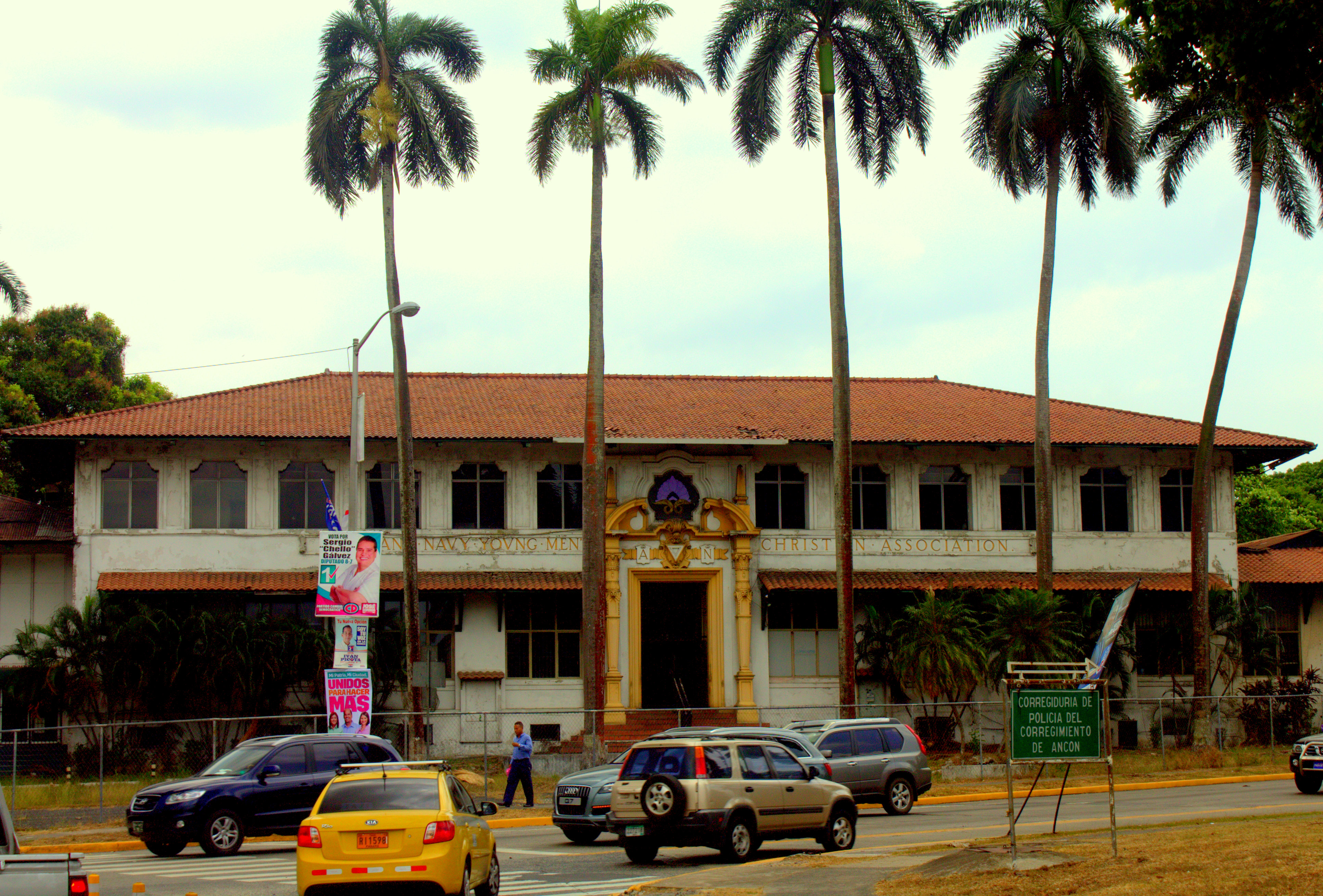
Former YMCA building in the Panama Canal Zone

In 1904, a letter was written by the chief engineer of the Panama Canal Zone, John Findley Wallace, to Admiral J.G. Walker, chairman of the Isthmian Canal Commission, recommending that YMCA be brought to the Canal Zone. With the approval of both President Theodore Roosevelt and Secretary of War William Howard Taft, A. Bruce Minear, an experienced secretary, was sent to organize the association work in the Canal Zone. Construction was started on YMCA clubhouses in Culebra, Empire, Gorgona, and Cristobal, Panama, as well as in Panama City. These clubhouses were operated by YMCA for several years and were financed by the Canal Zone, they contained billiard rooms, an assembly room, a reading room, bowling alleys, dark rooms for the camera clubs, gymnastic equipment, an ice cream parlor and soda fountain, and a circulating library. By 1920, there were nine buildings in operation in the Canal Zone.

Panama YMCA was founded on 24 May 1966. The 1968 impeachment of President Marco Aurelio Robles and the ensuing riots and political unrest impacted YMCA's work and the after-school programs at Panama YMCA were cancelled. Use of the school equipment, such as the pool and gym, greatly helped YMCA's ability to continue on with the swimming classes and summer programs. These programs remained popular throughout this time.

In 1983, planning was started for the integration of Panama YMCA and the American Services YMCA (ASYMCA). The integration of the remaining two ASYMCAs, the Balboa Branch and the Cristobal Branch, with the Panama Branch, a merger that was completed in 1990.

YMCA Panama continues its work for the betterment of today's society. In 2005, YMCA Panama inaugurated the new YMCA Panama School located on Colinas del Sol, in the Nuevo Chorrillo District of Arraijan.

==== Peru ====
YMCA Peru has a team of 200 employees and a voluntary body of more than 700 people. The organization describes its mission as "Having a positive impact on the young people so they have the will to transform the Peruvian society". YMCA Peru was created on 17 May 1920. It has presence in the departments of Lima, Arequipa, and Trujillo.

=== Middle East ===
==== Israel ====
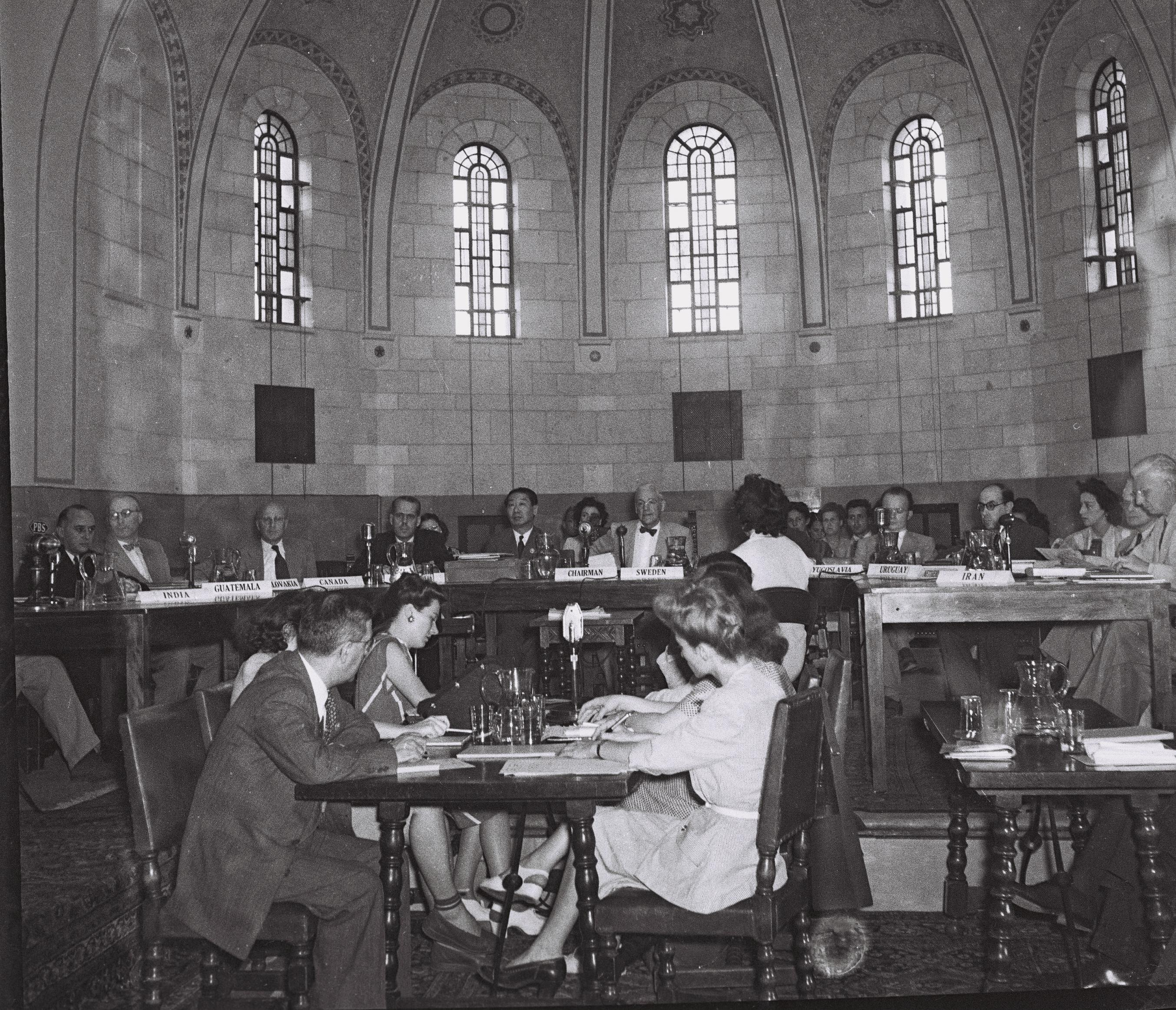
Many of the UNSCOP sessions to decide the fate of The British Mandate to Palestine were held at the Jerusalem YMCA.

In 1924, Archibald Clinton Harte, General Secretary of the International YMCA, raised the sum of one million dollars towards the construction of the building. The Jerusalem YMCA was dedicated in 1933 with the words “Here is a place whose atmosphere is peace, where political and religious jealousies can be forgotten and international unity be fostered and developed.” Harte's home on the shores of Galilee was bequeathed to the Jerusalem International YMCA as an international conference facility. The cornerstone was laid in 1928 by Lord Plumer, the British High Commissioner for Palestine, on a plot of land in the West Nikephoria section of Jerusalem, purchased from the Greek Orthodox Patriarchate of Jerusalem. The building was designed by the American architect Arthur Loomis Harmon of Shreve, Lamb and Harmon, who designed the Empire State Building. The Jerusalem YMCA housed the city's first heated swimming pool and first gymnasium with a wooden floor. The first concert broadcasts of the Voice of Israel radio station were transmitted from the YMCA auditorium.

In 1947, the YMCA was the venue of the UNSCOP talks leading up to the UN Partition Plan. At the end of April 1948, the building was taken over by the International Red Cross, which used it to shelter around 80 refugees. Two months later, it was used by the United Nations Mediation Committee headed by Count Bernadotte and then was taken over by the U.S. Consulate. In April 1949, the building was returned to YMCA.

==== Gaza ====
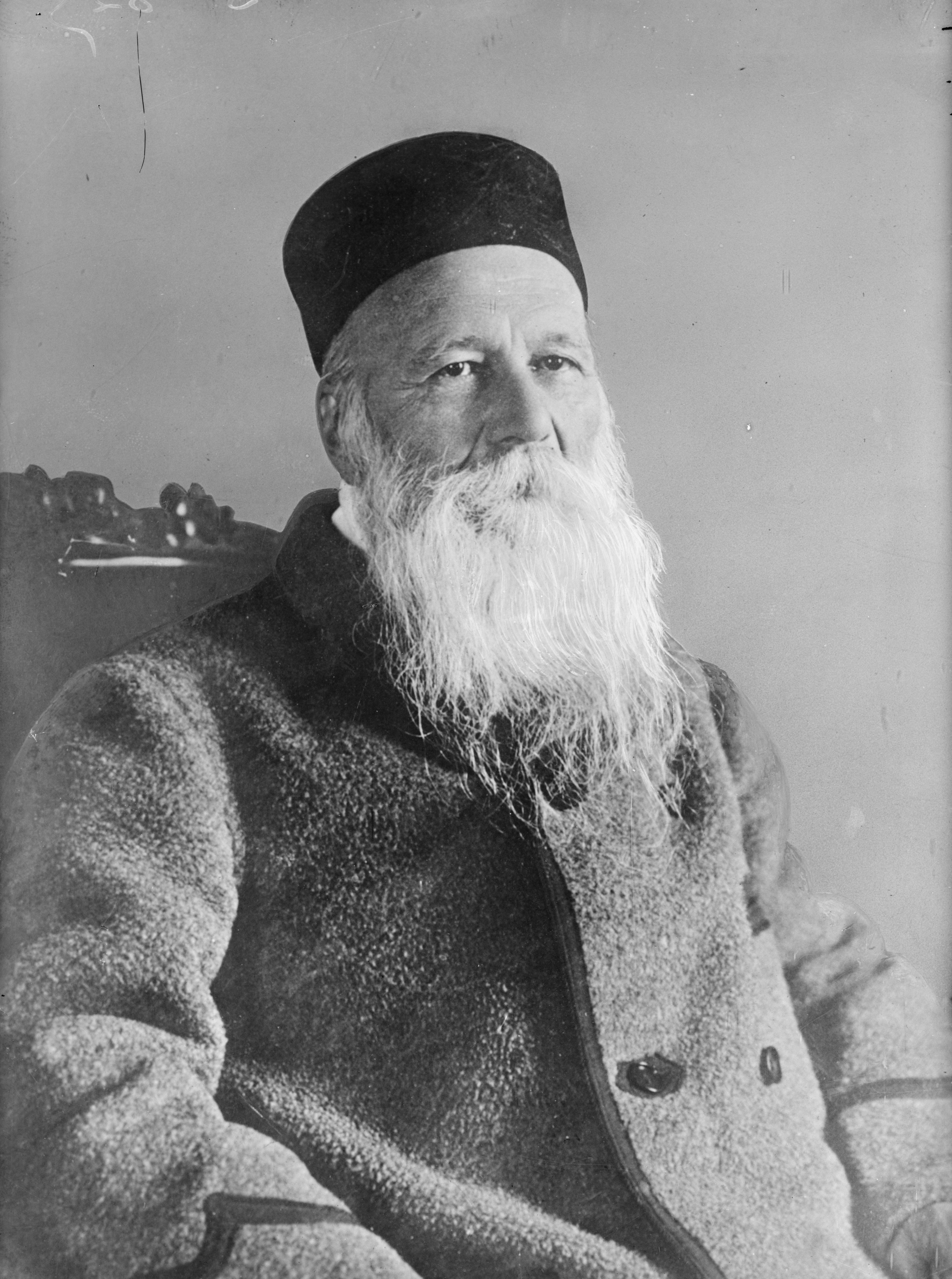
Henry Dunant

In 1952, the YMCA in Gaza City was started with the support of the Egypt YMCA, and was a branch of the Egypt YMCA until 1967, when the Gaza Strip fell under Israel’s control following the Six-Day War. Since then, Gaza YMCA has not been associated with any national organization. YMCA Gaza has five major departments: sports, arts, welfare, preschool, and youth. The youth department consists of approximately 80 youth leaders between the ages of 15 and 25 years old.

Despite having a strong Christian identity, the YMCA in Gaza is well respected in the Muslim community. The majority of YMCA attendees are Muslim. The staff are both Muslim and Christian, and the elected board is 100% Christian to balance inclusiveness without losing the YMCA’s Christian identity. The YMCA teaches youth about religious tolerance. In 2021, Gaza's YMCA served 1,800 youth.

In October, November, and December 2023, the YMCA in Gaza was used as a shelter for hundreds of people from the attacks on Gaza by Israel. On the 17th of December, the building was bombarded and destroyed by Israel, with reports of wounded and killed civilians. The next day, the World YMCA posted a response saying, “The World YMCA strongly condemns this horrific attack on civilians and calls on the Israeli government to stop its acts of indiscriminate violence which can only deepen division and which are causing such trauma. Violence begets violence. End it now.”

==== West Bank ====
There are four YMCA facilities in the West Bank, two of which are in East Jerusalem, one in Beit Sahour, and one in Ramallah. In 1948, the first YMCA in East Jerusalem was established in a tent in the Aqabat Jaber refugee camp after nearly 750,000 Palestinians were displaced from their homes in the 1948 war. It started programs that provided skills to the refugees and offered assistance to those in need. Later expanding to provide sports fields and further youth development. The facilities were then moved to East Jerusalem, where they provided support for the community during the 1967 war and occupation of the West Bank by Israel. In the Beit Sahour facility, they started a special rehabilitation program for disabled victims caused by injuries from the Israel Defense Forces in the late 1980s and early 1990s. This program is still running.

=== North America ===
==== Canada ====
The first YMCA in North America opened as a charity in Montreal, Quebec, on 25 November 1851. As of 2024 there were 35 YMCAs and 2 YMCA-YWCAs in Canada, cumulatively serving 2.25 million people annually in over 1,700 locations. Programs include children and youth, health, fitness, and recreation, childcare, day and resident camping, employment training, community outreach and newcomer services, international development and education, and leadership development and recognition. Its archives are held by Library and Archives Canada. Until 1912, when Canadian YMCAs formed their own national council, YMCAs were jointly administered by the International Committee of the Young Men's Christian Associations of North America.

==== United States ====
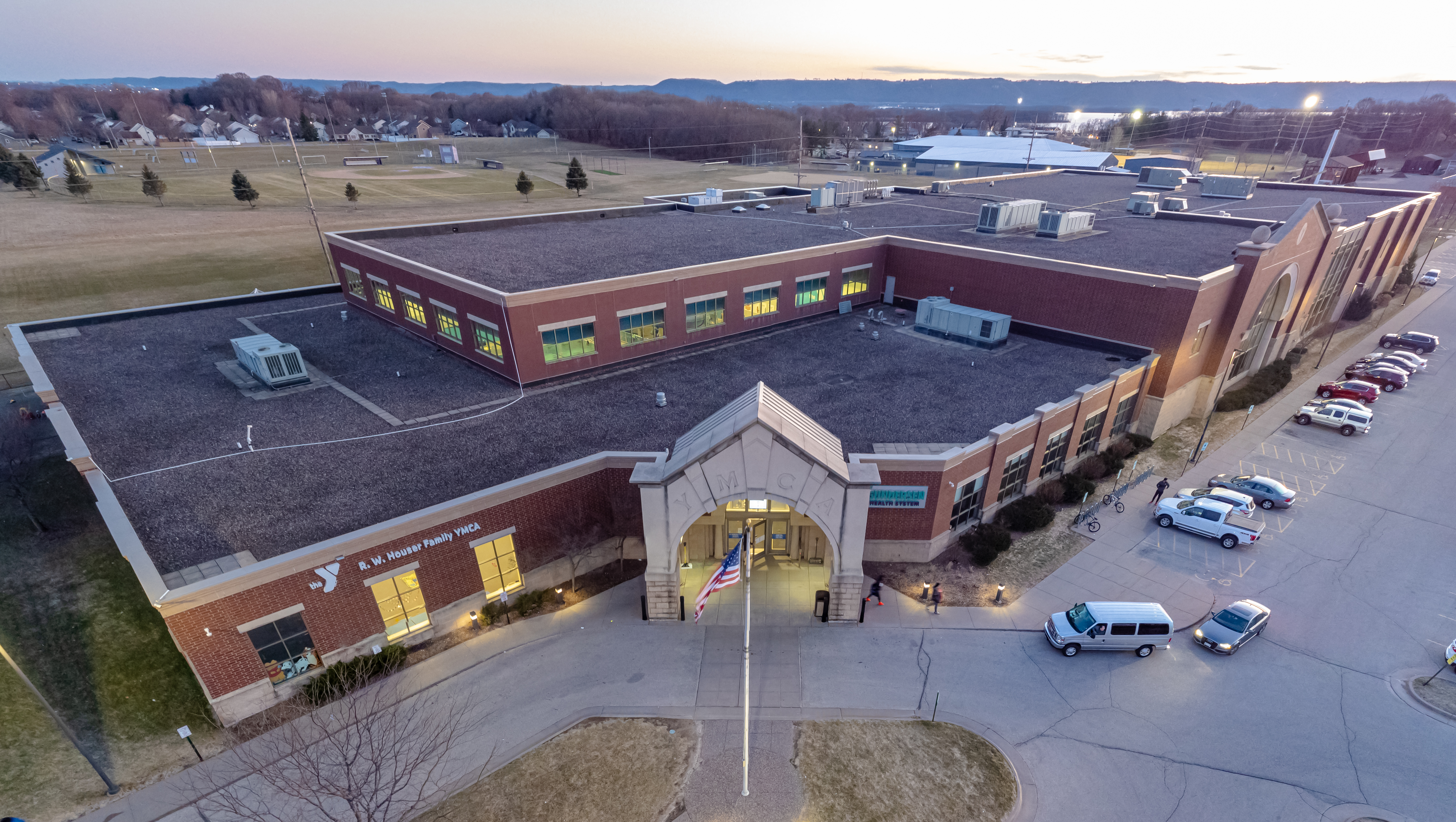
A YMCA in Onalaska, Wisconsin

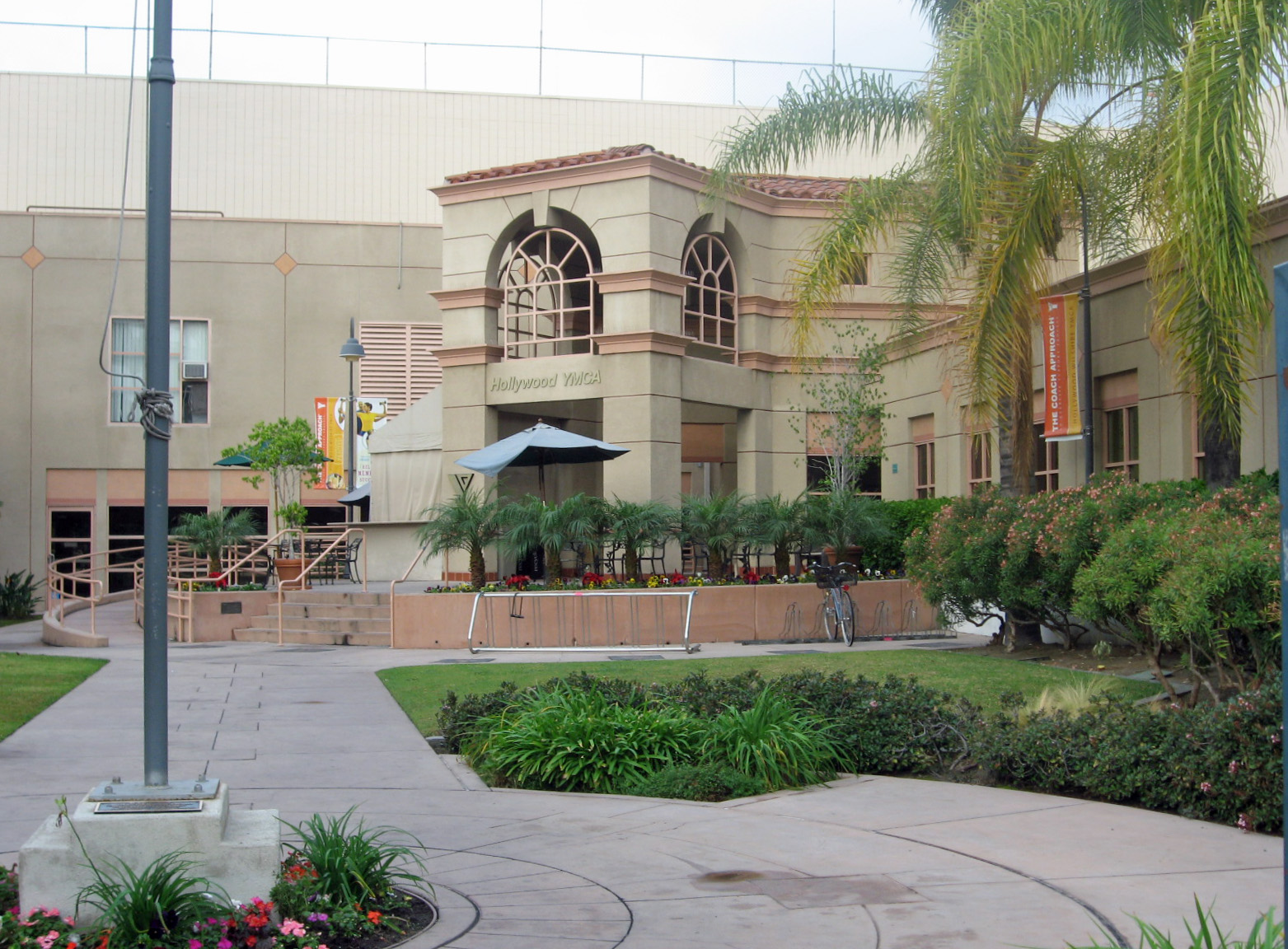
A YMCA in Hollywood, California in 2007

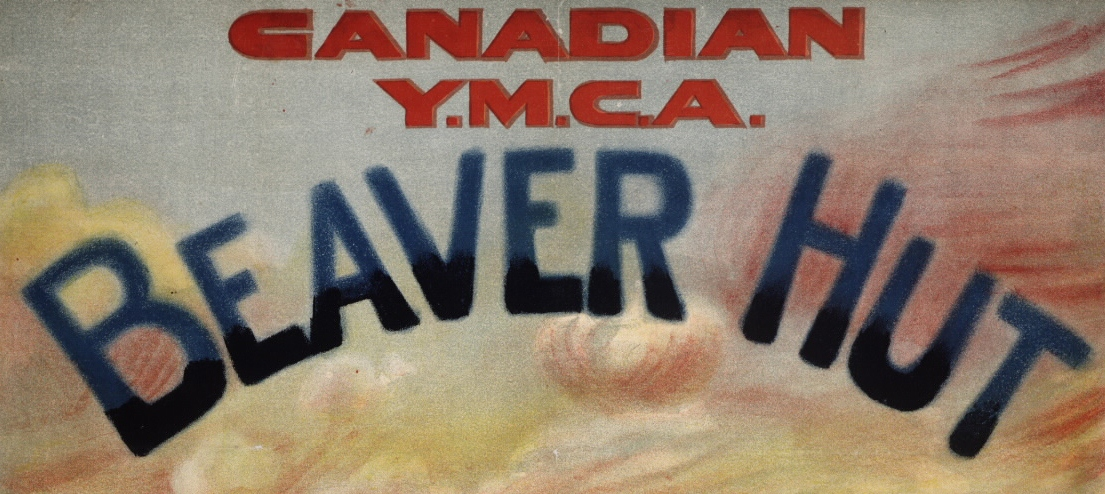
YMCA's Beaver Hut poster in 1939

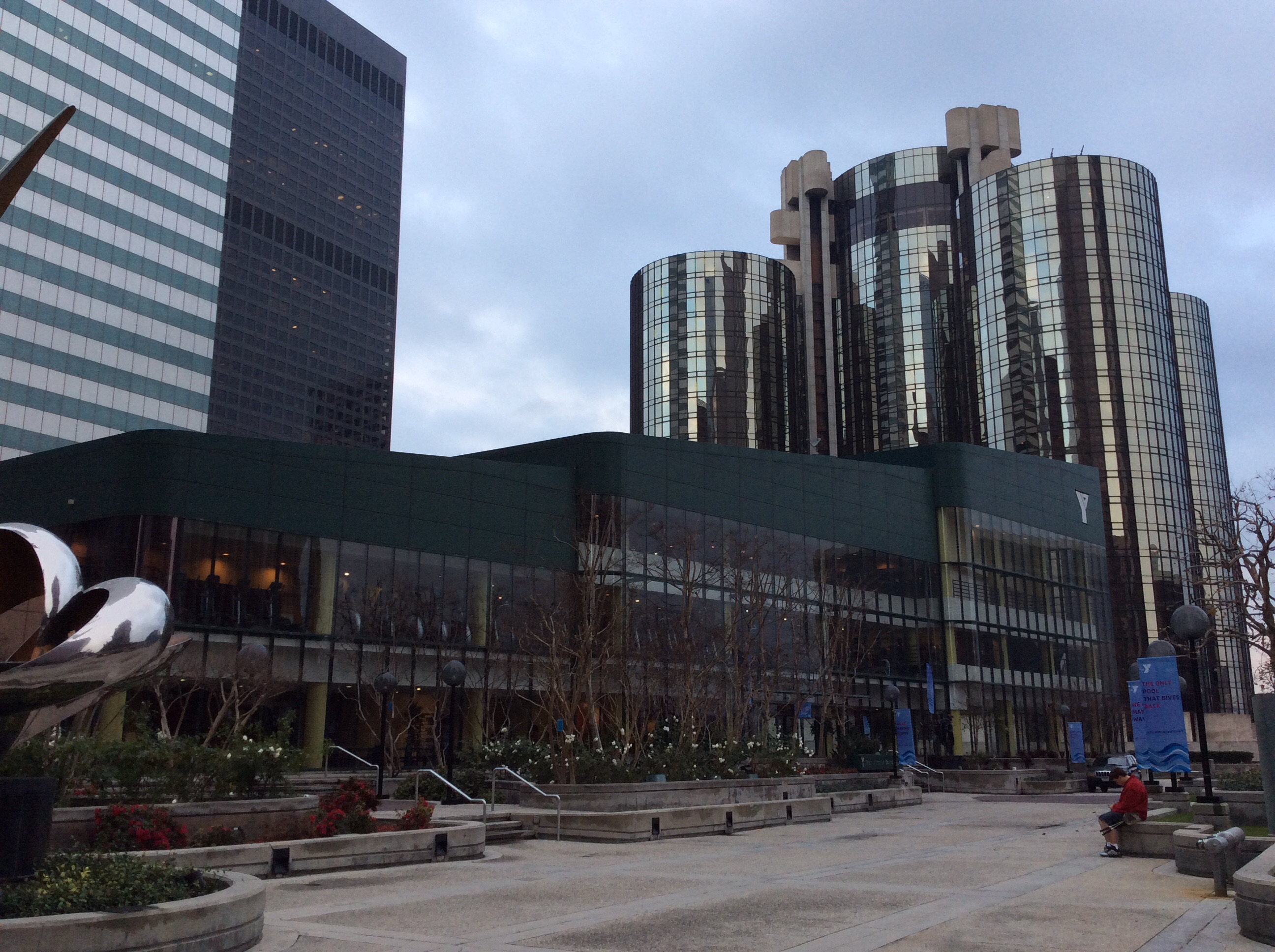
The Ketchum Downtown YMCA in Los Angeles

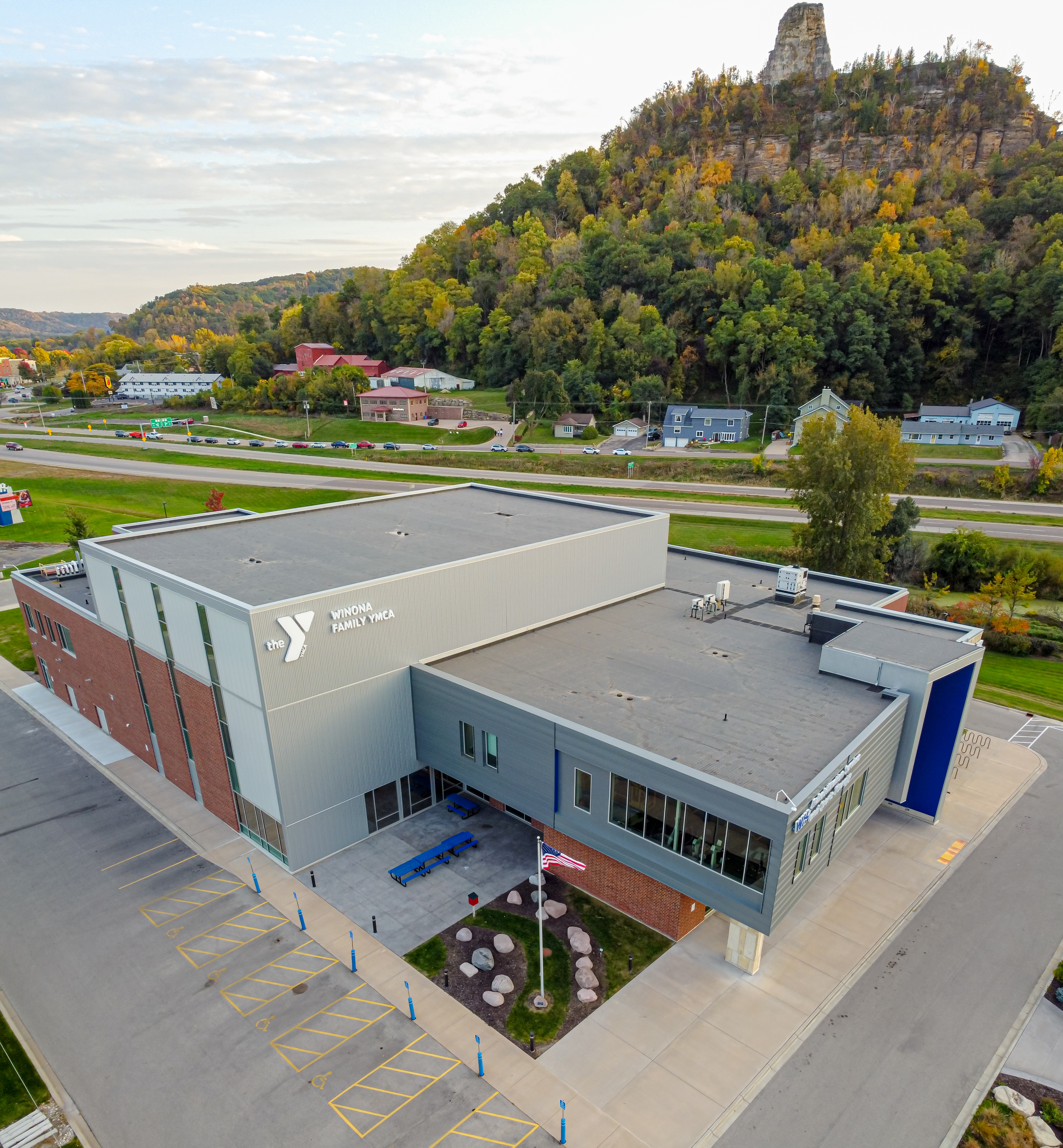
A YMCA in Winona, Minnesota in 2024

In the United States, YMCA is more commonly known as 'The Y', with national headquarters in Chicago. It has 800 separate organizational entities affiliated to its national office, based in 2,700 branch locations, working with 21 million people, to "strengthen communities through youth development, healthy living and social responsibility." It has about 19,000 staff and 600,000 volunteers.

Major programs include after-school activities, day care, youth work and physical fitness. A large number of locations have gyms, weight rooms, swimming pools, and sports courts.

The first YMCA in the United States opened on 29 December 1851, in Boston, Massachusetts. It was founded in 1851 by Captain Thomas Valentine Sullivan (1800–59), an American seaman and missionary. In 1853 the Reverend Anthony Bowen founded the first YMCA for Colored Men in Washington, D.C. The renamed Anthony Bowen YMCA is still serving the U Street area of Washington. It became a part of YMCA of the city of Washington in 1947. Through the middle part of the 20th century it was associated with covert homosexual subculture, with the athletic facilities providing a refuge and cover for closeted individuals.

YMCAs in the USA are one of the largest charitable nonprofits in the US, by public donations received, as listed by Forbes magazine. YMCA in the USA is one of the many organizations that espouses muscular Christianity.

Its national archives are located at the Kautz Family YMCA, at University of Minnesota Libraries Department of Archives and Special Collections. More digitally accessible archival information can be found at the Texas Christian University (TCU) Digital Repository.

== Nobel Peace Prize laureates ==
- 1901: Henry Dunant, who co-founded the Geneva YMCA in 1852 and was one of the founders of the World YMCA, was awarded the first-ever Nobel Peace Prize for founding the International Committee of the Red Cross in 1863, and inspiring the Geneva Conventions (Conventions de Genève). He shared the prize with Frédéric Passy, founder and president of the first French peace society.
- 1946: John R. Mott, US, president of the World YMCA, was awarded the Nobel Peace Prize for his "long and fruitful labors in drawing together the peoples of many nations, many races and many communions in a common bond of spirituality." John R. Mott also played an important role in the founding of the World Student Christian Federation in 1895, the 1910 World Missionary Conference and the World Council of Churches in 1948.

== Logo ==
The logo of the World Alliance of YMCAs, founded in 1881

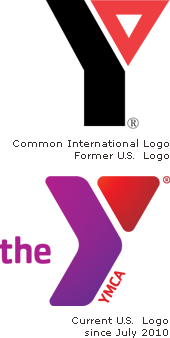
The International YMCA logo (top) and the United States YMCA logo (below)

In 1881, 26 years after its foundation, the official emblem of the World Alliance of YMCAs was adopted, at the Ninth International YMCA World Conference, in London. The circular emblem is made up of five segments, one for each continent. The segments are held together by small monograms of YMCA in different languages. As early as 1881, YMCA leaders believed the Movement could be truly international and united across borders. In the centre is a larger monogram of X and P, Chi and Rho, Christ's name, as used by early Christians. An open Bible sits on top of the monogram, showing John XVII, Verse 21, "that they all may be one". This was to remind YMCAs that Christ is at the centre of the Movement, a source of strength, hope and unity, binding them all together.

In 1891, Luther Gulick, a physical education director at YMCA of the US, introduced a new emblem to represent YMCA, an inverted red triangle. According to Gulick the triangle represented 'the whole man', with the three different aspects: mind, body and spirit. This logo became a familiar symbol of YMCA's work on the home front and around the world during WW1 and WW2, and remains in use.

In 2010, the YMCA of the USA changed its logo to "The Y" as part of a larger brand transformation.

== YMCA Vision 2030 ==
At the 20th World Council in Aarhus, Denmark, the global YMCA Movement adopted its first collective strategy, YMCA Vision 2030, intended as a roadmap for every YMCA's strategic goals, closely aligned to the UN Sustainable Development Goals. As of June 2023, 75 YMCA Movements worldwide were in the process of implementing YMCA Vision 2030.

Number	Date	Name	Location	Country
1	1855	First World Conference	Paris	Second French Empire
2	1858	Second World Conference	Geneva	Switzerland
3	1862	Third World Conference	London	United Kingdom of Great Britain and Ireland
4	1865	Fourth World Conference	Elberfeld	Kingdom of Prussia
5	1867	Fifth World Conference	Paris	Second French Empire
6	1872	Sixth World Conference	Amsterdam	Netherlands
7	1875	Seventh World Conference	Hamburg	German Empire
8	1878	Eighth World Conference	Geneva	Switzerland
9	1881	Ninth World Conference	London	United Kingdom of Great Britain and Ireland
10	1884	10th World Conference	Berlin	German Empire
11	1888	11th World Conference	Stockholm	Sweden
12	1891	12th World Conference	Amsterdam	Netherlands
13	1894	13th World Conference	London	United Kingdom of Great Britain and Ireland
14	1898	14th World Conference	Basel	German Empire
15	1902	15th World Conference	Christiania	Norway
16	1905	16th World Conference	Paris	French Third Republic
17	1909	17th World Conference	Elberfeld	German Empire
18	1913	18th World Conference	Edinburgh	United Kingdom of Great Britain and Ireland
19	1926	19th World Conference	Helsinki	Finland
20	1931	20th World Conference	Cleveland	USA
21	1937	21st World Conference	Mysore	British Raj (India)
22	1955	First World Council	Paris	French Fourth Republic
23	1957	Second World Council	Kassel	West Germany
24	1961	Third World Council	Geneva	Switzerland
25	1965	Fourth World Council	Gotemba, Shizuoka	Japan
26	1969	Fifth World Council	Nottingham	United Kingdom
27	1973	Sixth World Council	Kampala	Uganda
28	1977	Seventh World Council	Buenos Aires	Argentina
29	1981	Eighth World Council	Estes Park, Colorado	USA
30, 31	1985	Ninth and 10th World Council	Nyborg	Denmark
32	1988	11th World Council	Aruba	Aruba
33	1991	12th World Council	Seoul	South Korea
34	1994	13th World Council	Coventry	United Kingdom
35	1998	14th World Council	Frechen	Germany
36	2002	15th World Council	Mexico City	Mexico
37	2006	16th World Council	Durban	South Africa
38	2010	17th World Council	Hong Kong	Hong Kong
39	2014	18th World Council	Estes Park, Colorado	USA
40	2018	19th World Council	Chiang Mai	Thailand
41	2022	20th World Council	Aarhus	Denmark
42	2026	21st World Council	Toronto	Canada

== See also ==
- Clean living movement
- List of YMCA buildings
- New York Society for the Suppression of Vice
- Police Citizens Youth Club
- Polish YMCA
- TUXIS
- Young Men's Buddhist Association (YMBA)
- YMCA of Greater New York
- YMCA SCUBA Program
- Y.M.C.A. (song)

== Sources and further reading ==
- Alleman, Nathan F., and Dorothy E. Finnegan. "'Believe you have a mission in life and steadily pursue it': Campus YMCAs presage student development theory, 1894–1930." Higher Education in Review 6.1 (2009): 33+ online.
- Baker, William J. "To Play or to Pray? The YMCA Question in the United Kingdom and the United States, 1850-1900". International Journal of the History of Sport 1994 11#1: 42-62
- Copeland, Jeffrey C, and Yan Xu. The YMCA at War : Collaboration and Conflict during the World Wars. Lanham, Maryland: Lexington Books, an imprint of The Rowman & Littlefield Publishing Group, Inc., 2018.
- Fischer-Tiné, Harald, Stefan Huebner and Ian Tyrrell, eds. Spreading Protestant Modernity: Global Perspectives on the Social Work of the YMCA and YWCA (c. 1889–1970) (University of Hawai’i Press, 2020) abstract.
- Garnham, Neal. "'Both praying and playing:' Muscular Christianity" and the YMCA in north-east county Durham." Journal of Social History 35.2 (2001): 397-407, in England. online
- Hopkins, Charles Howard. History of the YMCA in North America (Association Press, 1951), a standard scholarly history History of the Y.M.C.A. in North America.
- Hosgood, Christopher P. "Negotiating Lower-Middle-Class Masculinity in Britain: The Leicester Young Men's Christian Association, 1870-1914." Canadian Journal of History 37.2 (2002): 253–274.
- Lord, Alexandra M. "Models of masculinity: sex education, the United States Public Health Service, and the YMCA, 1919–1924." Journal of the history of medicine and allied sciences 58.2 (2003): 123–152. online
- Macleod, David I. Building character in the American boy: The Boy Scouts, YMCA, and their forerunners, 1870-1920 (Univ of Wisconsin Press, 2004), a standard scholarly history.
- Muukkonen, Martti (2002). Ecumenism of the Laity: Continuity and Change in the Mission View of the World's Alliance of YMCAs, 1855–1955 (PDF). University of Joensuu. Publications in Theology 7. Archived (PDF) from the original on 9 October 2022.
- Putney, Clifford W. "Going Upscale: The YMCA and Postwar America, 1950-1990". Journal of Sport History 20#2 1993, pp. 151–166. online
- Steuer, Kenneth. Pursuit of an “Unparalleled Opportunity”: The American YMCA and Prisoner-of-War Diplomacy among the Central Power Nations during World War I, 1914-1923.New York: NY. Columbia University Press. 2009.
- Tlustý, Tomáš. “The YMCA in Central European Countries as One of the Ways of Americanising Central Europe after the First World War (Base of Information and Methodological Approaches Zo Researching the Issue).” Acta Universitatis Carolinae. Kinanthropologica 49, no. 2 (2014): 65–79. https://doi.org/10.14712/23366052.2014.7.
- Vertinsky, Patricia, and Aishwarya Ramachandran. "The 'Y' Goes to India: Springfield College, Muscular Missionaries, and the Transnational Circulation of Physical Culture Practices". Journal of Sport History 46#3 2019, pp. 363–379. online
- Watson, Nick J., Stuart Weir, and Stephen Friend. "The development of muscular Christianity in Victorian Britain and beyond." Journal of religion and society 7 (2005) pp 7–21.online.
- Wang, Peter Chen-main. “Caring Beyond National Borders: The YMCA and Chinese Laborers in World War I Europe.” Church History 78, no. 2 (2009): 327–49.
- Winter, Thomas. "Personality, Character, and Self-Expression: The YMCA and the Construction of Manhood and Class, 1877-1920." Men and Masculinities 2.3 (2000): 272–285.

=== Primary sources ===
- The Report of the Thirteenth Triennial International Conference and Jubilee Celebration of Young Men's Christian Associations. London: Jubilee Council. 1895.
- Young Men’s Christian Associations. National War Work Council. Summary of World War Work of the American Y.M.C.A.; with the Soldiers and Sailors of America at Home, on the Sea, and Overseas; New York, 1920.
