= Suzanne de Dietrich =

French protestant theologian

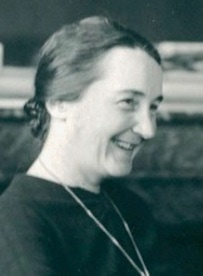
Suzanne de Dietrich in 1937.

Suzanne Anne de Dietrich (29 January 1891, in Niederbronn-les-Bains – 24 January 1981) was a French Protestant theologian known for her work in the ecumenical movement.

== Youth and education ==
=== Family background ===
Suzanne de Dietrich is the daughter of Charles de Dietrich and Anne von Türcke, and the granddaughter of Albert de Dietrich. The de Dietrich family is an emblematic family of Alsatian industrialists, several of whose members were ammestres or mayors of Strasbourg, notably Philippe-Frédéric, who commissioned the Chant de guerre pour l'armée du Rhin, composed by Claude Rouget de Lisle on April 25, 1792, while Suzanne's maternal family belonged to the nobility of Saxe-Meiningen.

Her Alsatian family was Lutheran, rooted in the faith tradition of the Ban de la Roche, marked by the pastors Jean-Frédéric Oberlin and Tommy Fallot.

=== Scientific studies and biblical training in Lausanne ===
She lost her parents when she was young, and her uncle, Eugène de Dietrich, became her guardian. Suzanne was destined by her family to become an engineer, "to take her place in the family business" and, with this in mind, she was sent to the French-speaking city of Lausanne, where she obtained a scientific baccalauréat in 1909, then entered the engineering school attached to the University of Lausanne and graduated as an electrical engineer in 1913. During her studies in Lausanne, she took an active part in the programs of the Christian Students' Association (ACE). In 1914, she took part in the congress of the French Federation of Christian Student Associations (Fédé); she was particularly involved in developing small-group Bible studies.

== Professional life ==
=== Head of youth federations ===
In 1929, she was elected vice-president of the World Student Christian Federation. She was also president of the Fédération française des éclaireuses from 1929 to 1933, representing the unionist section of this movement.

Suzanne de Dietrich was secretary of the Fédération française des associations chrétiennes d'étudiants (FFACE) from 1914 to 1935, and a member of the executive committee of the UCJF from 1920 to 1936; she continued to serve with the WSCF until 1946.

From 1939-1940, faced with the distress of evacuees from Alsace and Lorraine, Suzanne de Dietrich became involved with the displaced populations of south-west France. She co-founded CIMADE (Comité inter-mouvements auprès des évacués), which worked with refugees. CIMADE coordinated the youth organizations belonging to the Fédération protestante de France, the UCJ (Unions chrétiennes de jeunes gens et jeunes filles, or YMCA) and Protestant scouts (boys in the Éclaireurs unionistes and girls in the Fédération française des éclaireuses), and the Fédération française des associations chrétiennes d'étudiants (la Fédé).

In 1941 she was one of the 16 pastors and lay people who wrote the Thèses de Pomeyrol, a declaration of resistance to the Nazis.

She also wrote Le Dessein de Dieu (God’s Will) which was published in 1945.

She took part in the early days of the Bossey Ecumenical Institute, founded by Willem Visser 't Hooft, and was director of studies from 1946 to 1954, with particular responsibility for Bible courses for lay people. In 1948, she was part of the team preparing "God's Purpose and the Church's Witness" for the first plenary assembly of the World Council of Churches in Amsterdam. During the Assembly, she was a consultant to the committee on the "importance of the laity" in the Church.

== See also ==
Madeleine Barot

== Bibliography ==
- Hans-Rudi Weber: Suzanne de Dietrich 1891–1981, la passion de vivre. Éditions Olivétan, 1995.
