= Paris Basis =

The Paris Basis is a group of principles guiding the relationships between individual YMCAs.

Ninety-nine YMCA leaders of individual YMCAs from Europe and North America met for the first time prior to the 1855 Paris World Exposition to discuss the possibility of joining together in a federation to enhance co-operation amongst individual YMCA societies. This meeting resulted in the first World Conference of YMCA from 19 to 24 August 1855, and the creation of the Paris Basis which is still a guiding principle of the organization today.

It was the idea of Frédéric Monnier, from the Paris YMCA, who having met Henry Dunant in 1852 had worked on plans for a basis of general union of local YMCAs around the world. The handwritten draft is held at the World Alliance of YMCAs headquarters, in Geneva, Switzerland, and is believed to be the handwriting of Théophile Rivier, although it is understood that the handwritten draft differs from the final draft submitted to the Conference on 24 August 1855.

Two themes resonated during the council:

1. the need to respect the local autonomy of YMCA societies and
2. the dogma that Christian churches are united and the YMCA is a way of manifesting that unity. (Muukkonen, 2002:85)

In 1895 it became the basis for the World Student Christian Federation, and in 1898 the basis for the YWCA. It later became the basis for the Faith and Order Movement, and through it for the World Council of Churches itself.

== Respect of Local Autonomy ==
The need for the respect of local autonomy is expressed in the preamble:

The Committee has never upheld the opinion that all the Associations should adhere to the same forms and methods; on the contrary, it fully recognizes the necessity of an individual growth based on the local conditions and the influences of varying circumstances.

== Unity of Churches ==
The main principle of the Paris Basis is expressed:

The Young Men's Christian Associations seek to unite those young men who, regarding Jesus Christ as their God and Saviour, according to the Holy Scriptures, desire to be his disciples in their faith and in their life and to associate their efforts for the extension of His Kingdom amongst young men.

The main principle of the Paris Basis is often stated as the entire basis and the preamble and other articles are omitted.

There are two versions of the Paris Basis, one in French and one in English. It is thought that the French version is the more accurate representation of the agreement reached and that the English version was a result of a later transcription of notes after the meeting. Some adjustments were made to the English version to align it with the French version in 1955. In the French version the last two words of the main principle are "jeunes gens" which more accurately translates as "young people" rather than young men (although all participants in YMCAs at the time were male). (Muukkonen, 2002:90).

== See also ==
- World Student Christian Federation
