= Madeleine Barot =

French activist and theologian (1909–1995)

Madeleine Barot (4 July 1909 in Châteauroux – 28 December 1995 in Paris) was a French activist and theologian, who was influential in Protestant, humanist, and human rights movements.

== Biography ==
Madeleine Barot was the daughter of Alexandre Auguste Barot, a literature teacher from Clermont-Ferrand, and Madeleine Kuss. From 1927 to 1934, she began her studies at Sorbonne University in Paris, where she achieved both a graduate degree in History and a diploma in library/archives. In 1934, she became an intern at the Bibliothèque nationale de France. She was then hired as a librarian at the École française de Rome, where she worked from June, 1935 to June, 1940.

Barot was active in young Protestant associations through the French Federation of Christian Student Associations, founded in 1895. In July–August 1939, she chaired a committee at the World Conference of Christian Youth in Amsterdam, organized by Willem Visser 't Hooft, which promoted the amalgamation of Protestant movements. She thus became involved in the prewar resistance movement, inspired by Swiss pastor Karl Barth.

A friend of pastor Marc Boegner, Barot was named Secretary General of Cimade during a meeting of the heads of young Protestant movements on August 15, 1940, replacing Georgette Siegrist. She held that position until 1956.

Madeleine Barot was directly responsible for the presence of Cimade in camps, by first forcing her own way into the Gurs camp following negotiations with administrative authorities. This presence was subsequently extended to other camps.She maintained affiliations with Christian organizations, she also proved to be energetic and well connected nationally as well as internationally.

In 1953, Madeleine Barot was put in charge of the "Men and Women in the Church and Society" department by the World Council of Churches. There, she began important work in carving out a space for women within the church. She was involved in several important organizations:

- A Commission for Church support in development;
- France's Protestant Federation
- Christian Action For the Abolition of Torture
- A Conference of Religions for Peace

She also continued her work with Cimade.

In 1988, she was given the status of Righteous Among the Nations on the Yad Vashem Holocaust Memorial, which honours people throughout Europe who directly or indirectly helped to protect and support Jews during the Third Reich.

Barot died on December 28, 1995.

== Notes and references ==
=== Bibliographic resources ===
- Jacques (André), Madeleine Barot. Une indomptable énergie, Genève, éditions du Cerf et Labor et Fides, 1989
- Barot (Madeleine) dir., Itinéraires socialistes chrétiens : jalons sur le christianisme social hier et aujourd’hui : 1882-1982, Genève, Labor et Fides, 1983
- Kévonian (Dzovinar), Dreyfus-Armand (Geneviève), Blanc-Chaléard (Marie-Claude), Amar (Marianne) dir., La Cimade et l'accueil des réfugiés. Identités, répertoires d'actions et politiques de l'asile, 1939-1994, Paris, Presses universitaires de Paris-Ouest, 2013, 265 p.
- Mayeur (Jean-Marie), Encrevé (André), Les Protestants, dictionnaire du monde religieux dans la France contemporaine, Beauchesne / CNRS, 1993, 534 pages, ISBN 2701012619, p. 58.
