= Sebouh Chouldjian =

Armenian Apostolic prelate

His Eminence Archbishop Sebouh Chouldjian
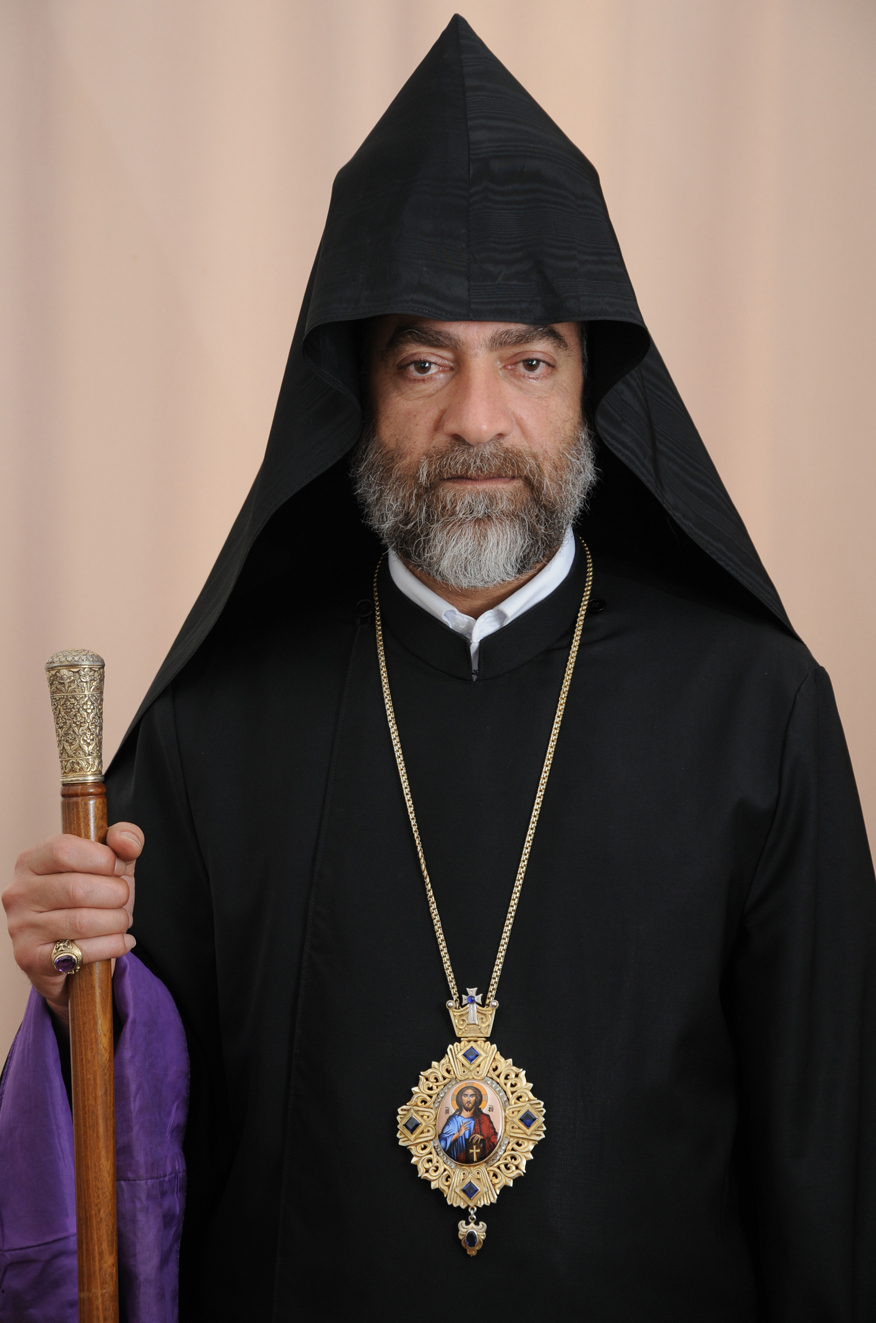
- Archbishop Sebouh Chouldjian
- Church: Armenian Apostolic Church
- Diocese: Diocese of Gougark
- See: Mother See of Holy Etchmiadzin
- Appointed: 3 June 1996
- Term ended: 19 November 2020

Orders
- Ordination: 7 June 1987 by Archbishop Nerses Pozapalian
- Consecration: 15 June 1997 by Karekin I

Personal details
- Born: Haik Sarkis Chouldjian; 24 March 1959 Malatya, Turkey
- Died: 19 November 2020 (aged 61) Yerevan, Armenia
- Buried: Prelacy of the Diocese of Gougark, Vanadzor, Armenia

Archbishop Sebouh Chouldjian (24 March 1959 – 19 November 2020, born Haik Sarkis Chouldjian (Note: Armenian: Սեպուհ արքեպիսկոպոս Չուլճեան; Turkish: Başpiskopos Sebuh Çulcuyan; Russian: Архиепископ Сепух Чулджян; also Sebuh, Sepouh, Sepuh, Chuljian, Tchuljian, Chuljyan, Çulciyan)) was the metropolite of the Diocese of Gougark of the Holy Armenian Apostolic Church.

== Biography ==
Haik Chouldjian was born on 24 March 1959 in Malatya, Turkey. He received his primary education at the Nersisian College of Istanbul. In 1969, his family resettled in Soviet Armenia, in the city of Gyumri, where he continued and finished his primary education.

In 1978 he entered the Gevorkian Theological Seminary at the Mother See of Holy Etchmiadzin. He was ordained to the diaconate in 1985, by the Grand Sacristan of the Mother See of Holy Etchmiadzin, Archbishop Hoosik Santourian. He successfully defended his final thesis entitled "The Translation Works of Lukas of Kharpert" in March 1986. Upon his graduation from the seminary he was appointed to serve in the Secretariat of the Pontifical Administration.

He was ordained as a celibate priest by Archbishop Nerses Pozapalian on 7 June 1987, the Feast of Pentecost, and given the priestly name Sebouh. Following his ordination, he continued his service in the Pontifical Administration.

By the appointment of Vazgen I, Catholicos of All Armenians, he served as the Vice Dean of the Gevorkian Theological Seminary at the Mother See of Holy Etchmiadzin in September 1987. In November 1989, he successfully defended his doctoral thesis entitled "The Fast in the Armenian Apostolic Church," and received the rank of Archimandrite (Vardapet).

In 1990, Vazgen I appointed Father Sebouh to serve as the spiritual pastor of the Armenians of Geneva, Switzerland. He returned to Armenia in 1991 to serve as the Vicar of the Diocese of Shirak.

After Armenia gained independence, vast administrative tasks were placed on the Armenian Church. In the summer of 1993, Father Sebouh worked closely with Archbishop Hovnan Derderian (the then primate of the Diocese of Canada) and Ronald Alepian to organize the first mission of Canadian Youth Mission to Armenia (CYMA). In June 1995, Father Sebouh was appointed to serve as the Director of the Reserve Stewardship Inventory Committee of the Armenian Church. Also in that same year, he was appointed to serve as the Director of the committee responsible for tracking the return and receipt of all previously confiscated church buildings, land and construction projects (most of the churches, buildings, structures and properties belonging to the Church had been seized by the State during the time of the Soviet Regime).

In 1996, he served as the representative of the Armenian Church on the Humanitarian Aid Central Committee of Armenia. On 3 June 1996, by the Pontifical Encyclical of the Karekin I, Catholicos of All Armenians, he was appointed to serve as the Primate of the Diocese of Gougark.

Father Chouldjian was consecrated as Bishop by Catholicos Karekin I on 15 June 1997. He was a member of the Supreme Spiritual Council of the Armenian Church during 2000–2007. On 18 May 2012 he received title of Archbishop.

Archbishop Sebouh Chouldjian served as the Primate of the Diocese of Gougark in Armenia. Chouldjian died on 19 November 2020 due to COVID-19.

== Candidacy for Armenian Patriarch of Constantinople ==
=== Co-Patriarch candidacy in 2010 ===
Bishop Sebouh Chouldjian was one of the three candidates for the Co-Patriarch at the Armenian Patriarchate of Constantinople in 2010.

Mesrop II Mutafyan, the Armenian Patriarch of Constantinople was diagnosed with Alzheimer's disease in July 2008, and was incapable of running the Patriarchate since then. This led the Armenian community to a painful condition of uncertainty. In late 2009, the Patriarchate's Religious Council wrote to the Turkish government seeking permission to elect a coadjutor (co-Patriarch). Three bishops stated that they were going to run for the elections: Bishop Sebouh Chouldjian, Archbishop Karekin Bekchian – the Primate of the Armenian Church Diocese of Germany, and Archbishop Aram Ateshian – the chairman of the Supreme Spiritual Council of the Patriarchate of Istanbul.

Among the main ideas proposed by Bishop Sebouh as a candidate was that the Armenian Patriarchate of Constantinople should become a spiritual and cultural bridge among Yerevan, Ankara and the Armenian Diaspora. He paid particular attention to the importance of dialogue among Armenians and between Turkish and Armenian people.

On 10–17 February 2010 Bishop Sebouh visited Istanbul, Turkey to have meetings with the Armenian community of Istanbul. During his meetings and interviews he urged to continue Hrant Dink's way (i.e. dialogue between Armenian and Turkish people) and keep Armenian Patriarchate free from politics.

On 29 June 2010 the government of Turkey made a decision to reject the request of the Armenian community of Turkey to allow co-patriarch elections. The Turkish Government said that they did not find the elections of either patriarch or co-patriarch reasonable and allowed carrying out only the elections of Patriarchal Locum Tenens. Hours later Archbishop Shahan Svajian – the that time Locum Tenens, resigned and the Spiritual council of the Patriarchate elected Archbishop Aram Ateshian a new Patriarchal Locum Tenens. However, according to some experts, the Armenian Community of Turkey was inclined to elect Bishop Sebouh Chouldjian (citizen of Armenia) as their spiritual leader which was disallowed by the Turkish government after unsuccessful negotiations of Armenia-Turkey reconciliation.

Later, in his letter to the Armenian Community of Turkey from 15 July 2010 Bishop Sebouh mentioned that interference of Turkey's Government was in contradiction with the adopted new policy on dealing with ethnic minorities. "We continue to hope that this is not the manner of actions of Erdoğan's government, but that of the stationary state sub-agencies, which hamper the democratic development of Turkey with their old mentality". Bishop Sebouh said it was the moral obligation of Archbishop Aram Ateshian to send a new letter to the Turkey's Government with request to hold the elections of Co-Patriarch.

Protests were raised within the Armenian community, though it was hardly possible to hold new patriarch elections as long as the current patriarch Mesrop II was alive. The "We Want to Elect Our Own Patriarch Initiative" remained active and held silent protests in Armenian churches on Sundays. Archbishop Sebouh occasionally visited Turkey and expressed his position and opinion on issues warring the community.

=== Patriarch candidacy in 2016 ===
2016 gave rise to a new wave of demands to eventually elect the head of the Armenian Church in Turkey. In spring 2016 two of the four main candidates, Archbishop Sebouh and Archbishop Karekin Bekdjian urged that there be patriarch election "now". Archbishop Sebouh declared that should there be election of patriarch there was no obstacle for him to be a candidate. "If the society finds me qualified for solving the problems of Armenian society and the patriarchate, I am ready to serve by considering it as a holy duty," he said. In June 2016 a group of Turkish Armenians protested in front of the Armenian Patriarchate against being denied the right to replace acting Locum Tenens Aram Ateşyan whose reputation was compromised after his letter to president Recep Tayyip Erdoğan, wherein he criticized a recent decision by the German Bundestag recognizing the World War I-era killings of Anatolian Armenians. In October 2016 the Clerical Assembly of the Armenian Patriarchate of Turkey decided to superannuate the Patriarch Mesrob II on the grounds that he has been unable to perform his duty for 7 years and announced that there will be an application for starting the election process.

=== Patriarch candidacy in 2019 ===
On 8 March 2019 Patriarch Mutafian died at the age of 62. This event provoked new discussions about the patriarch elections. Back then experts predicted that the two main candidates for the patriarch would be Archbishops Sebouh Chouldjian and Aram Ateshian.

On 27 September 2019 Archbishop Sebouh Chouldjian released a statement requiring from the Turkish government to restore the original text of the 25th clause of canonical regulation which was violating the rights of bishops from outside Turkey.

In October 2019, following Archbishop Garegin Bekchyan, Archbishop Sebouh called on Archbishops Sahak Mashalyan and Aram Ateshian to rise above personal ambitions and consider the long-term interest of the Armenian community and stand in favor of supporting the rights of bishops outside Turkey.

On 5 December 2019 Archbishop Sebouh released an official statement regarding the election of 85th Armenian Patriarch of Constantinople, indicating that he "forgives everyone", who caused his disentitlement. He said: "It is now beyond any doubt, that the reason for the staging of the "canonical change" was myself, since the support for me by a significant portion of faithful Armenian people in Turkey could be decisive". He condemned this as an outrageous historical injustice and indirectly pointed out the nefarious role of Archbishops Sahak Mashalyan and Aram Ateshian.

On 11 December 2019 Bishop Mashalian was announced the 85th Armenian Patriarchate of Constantinople.

== Honors and awards ==
Archbishop Sebouh was a member of the Armenian branch of the International Academy of Natural and Social Sciences (since 2000).

He held Fridtjof Nansen Golden Medal (2005), Republic of Armenia Prime Minister's Medal for vast contribution in development of state-church relations (2006), Hayrenik Gold Medal (2010).

On 24 March 2009, Prime Minister of Armenia Tigran Sargsyan warmly congratulated Archbishop Sebouh on the occasion of the 50th anniversary of birthday. In his message he emphasized Bishop Sebouh's input in organizing Christian education, revivification of church life and restoration of ethnic and spiritual identity of the Armenian nation.

== Gallery ==
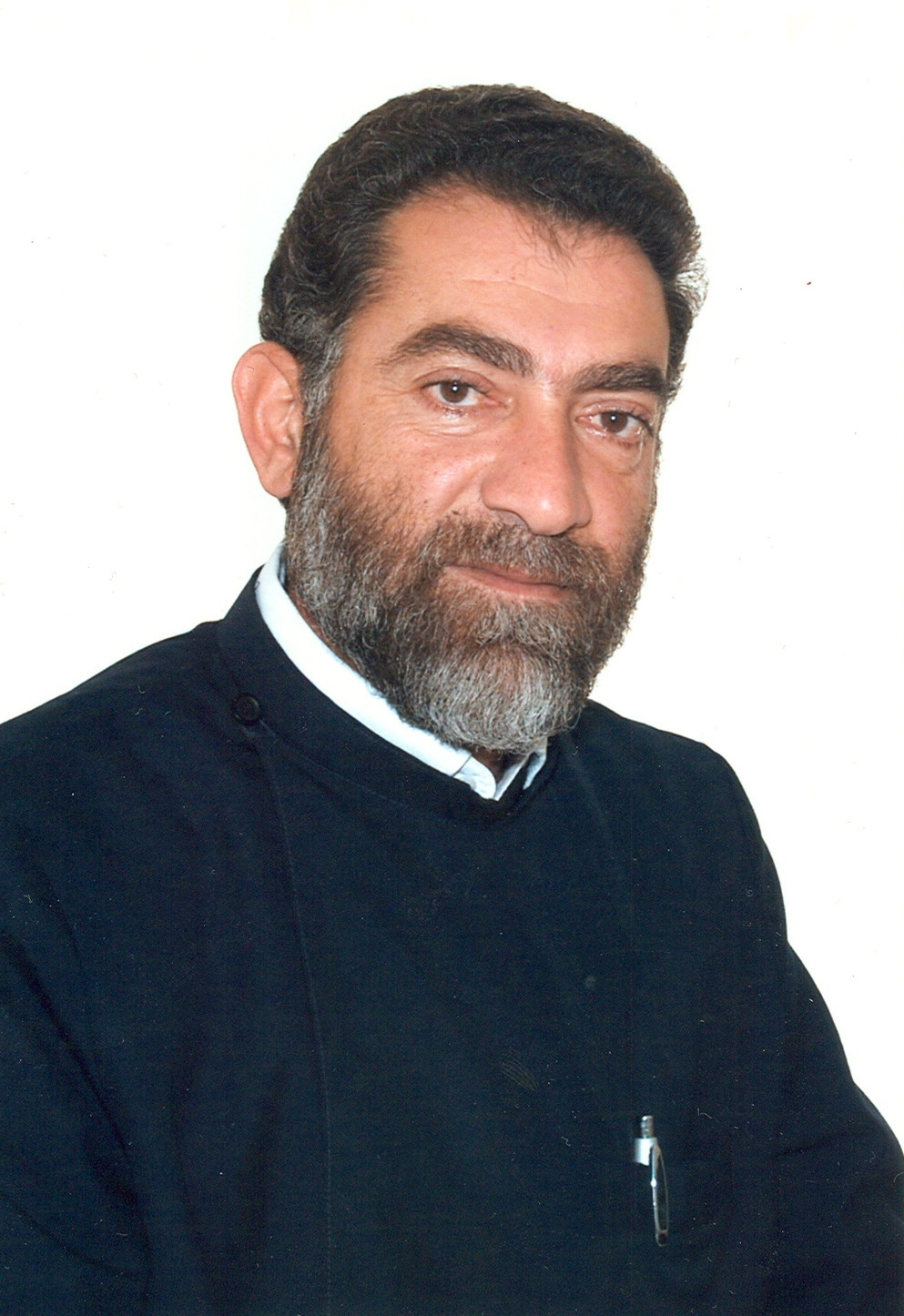
Archbishop Sebouh Chouldjian

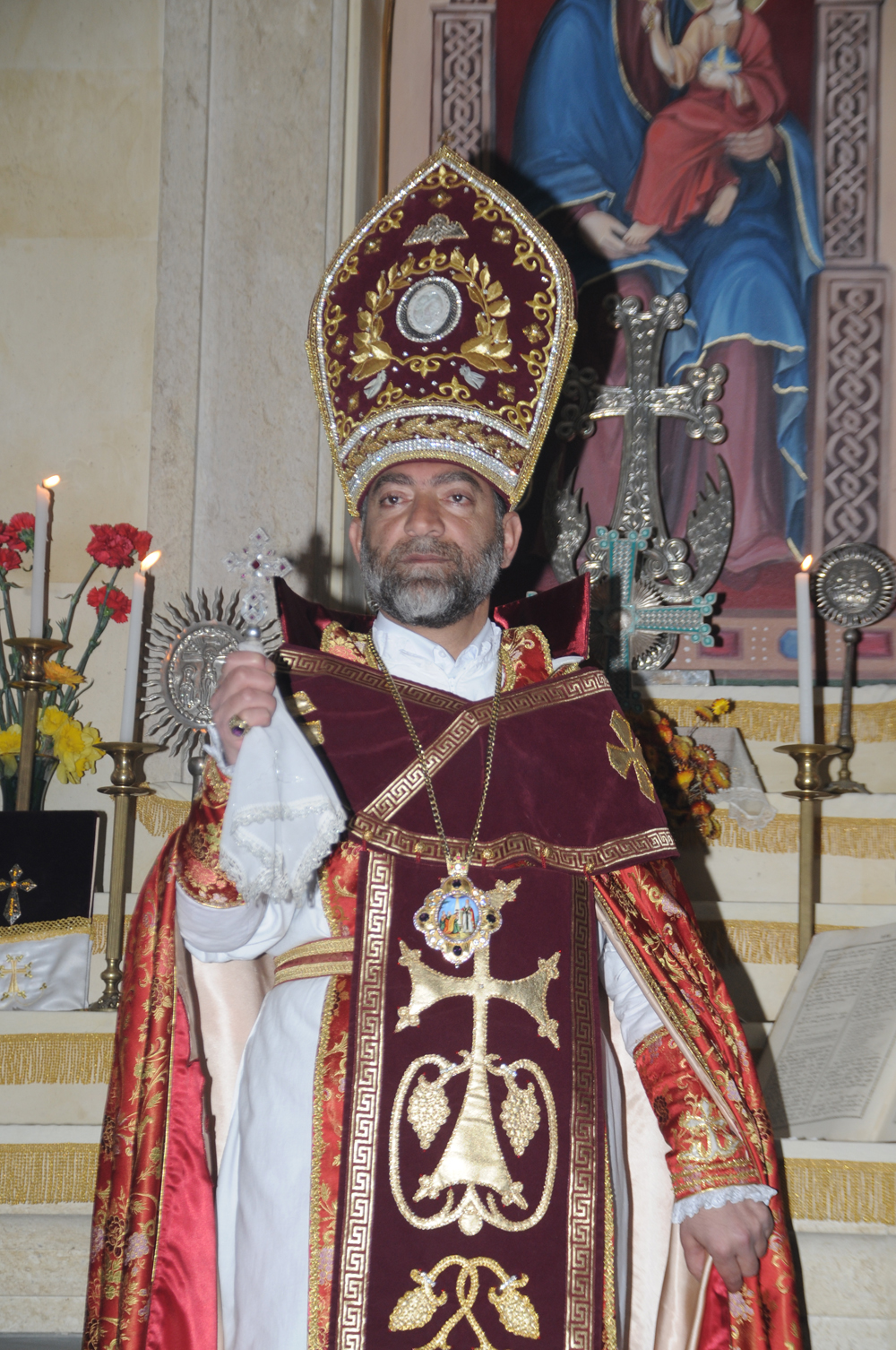
Archbishop Sebouh during Liturgy

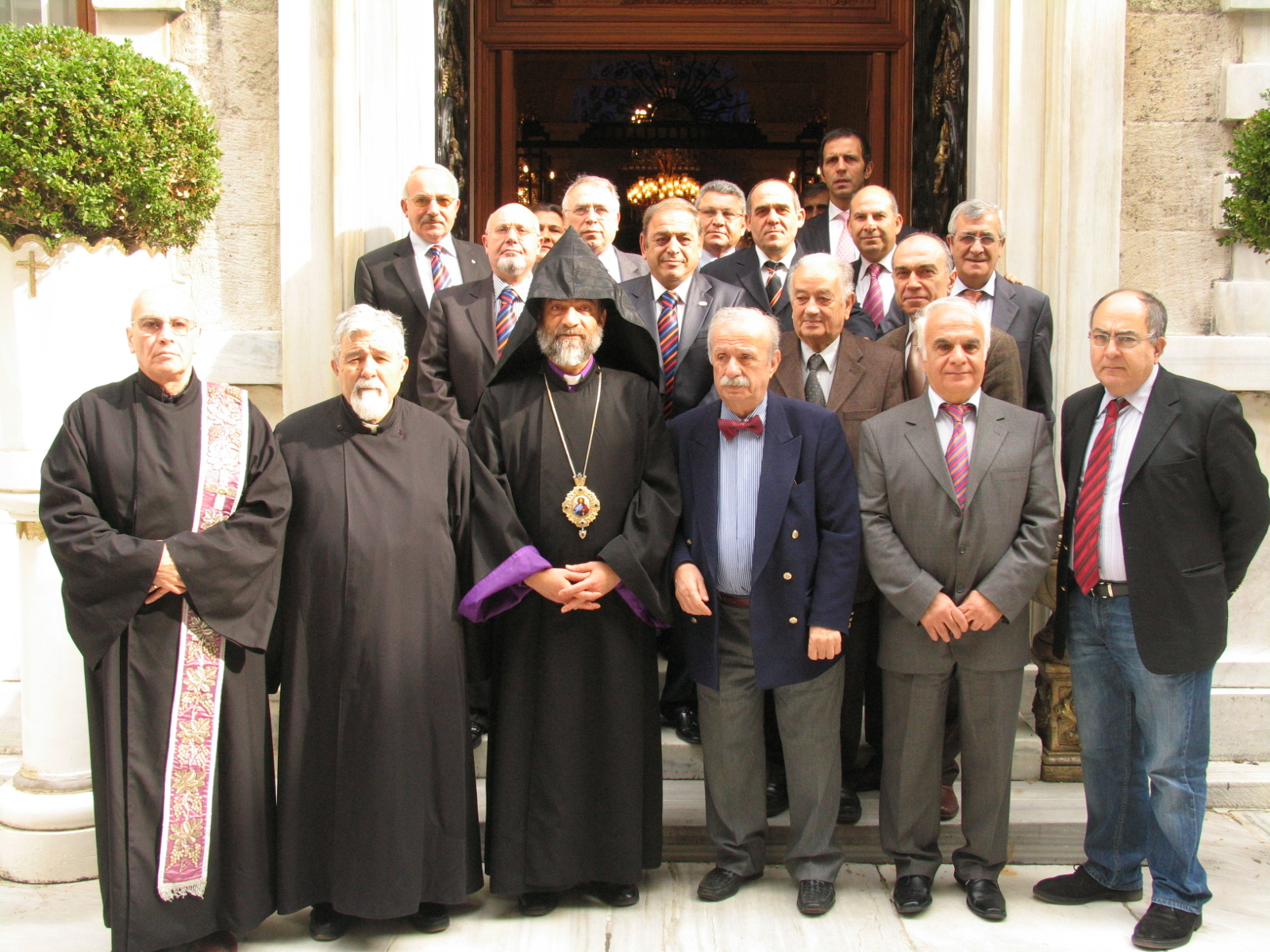
Archbishop Sebouh with representatives of Istanbul Armenian Community

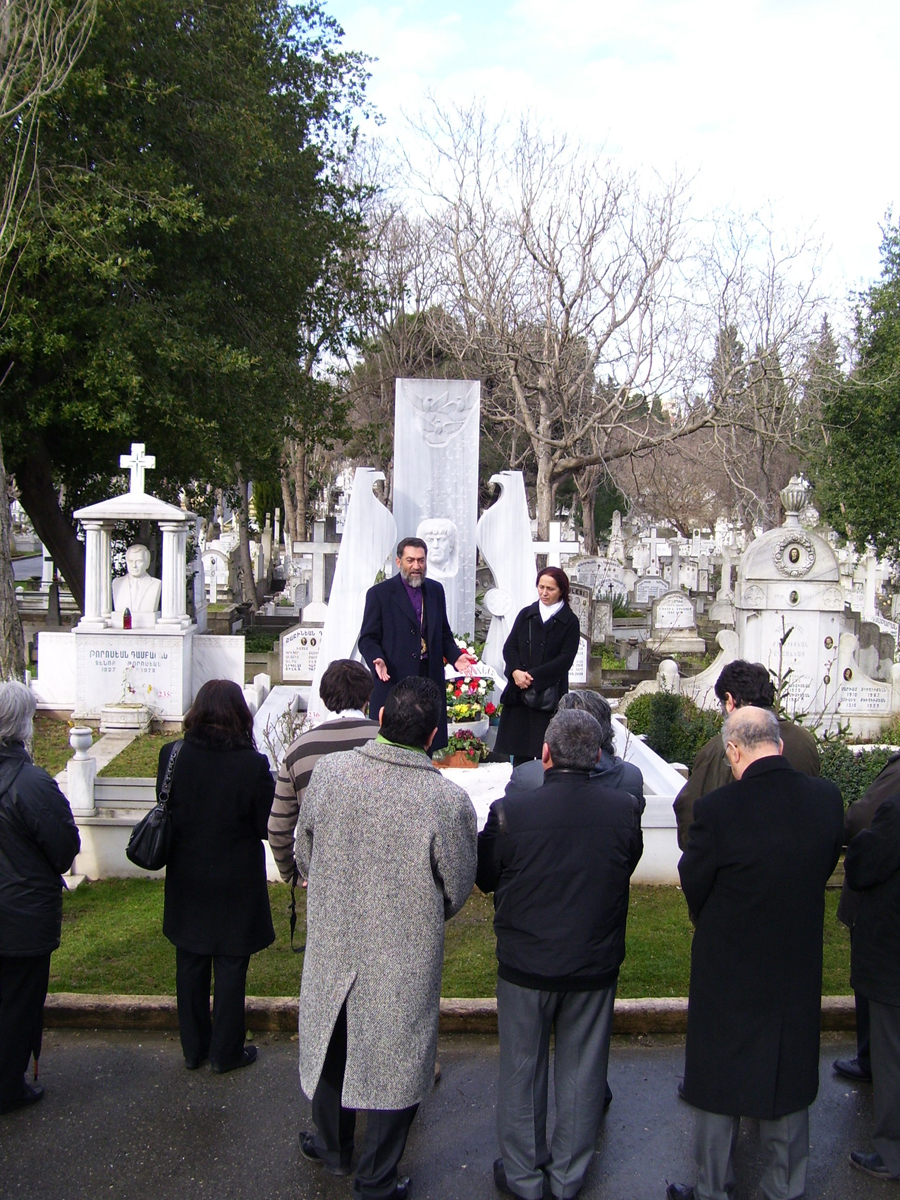
Archbishop Sebouh at the grave of Hrant Dink in Istanbul, Turkey

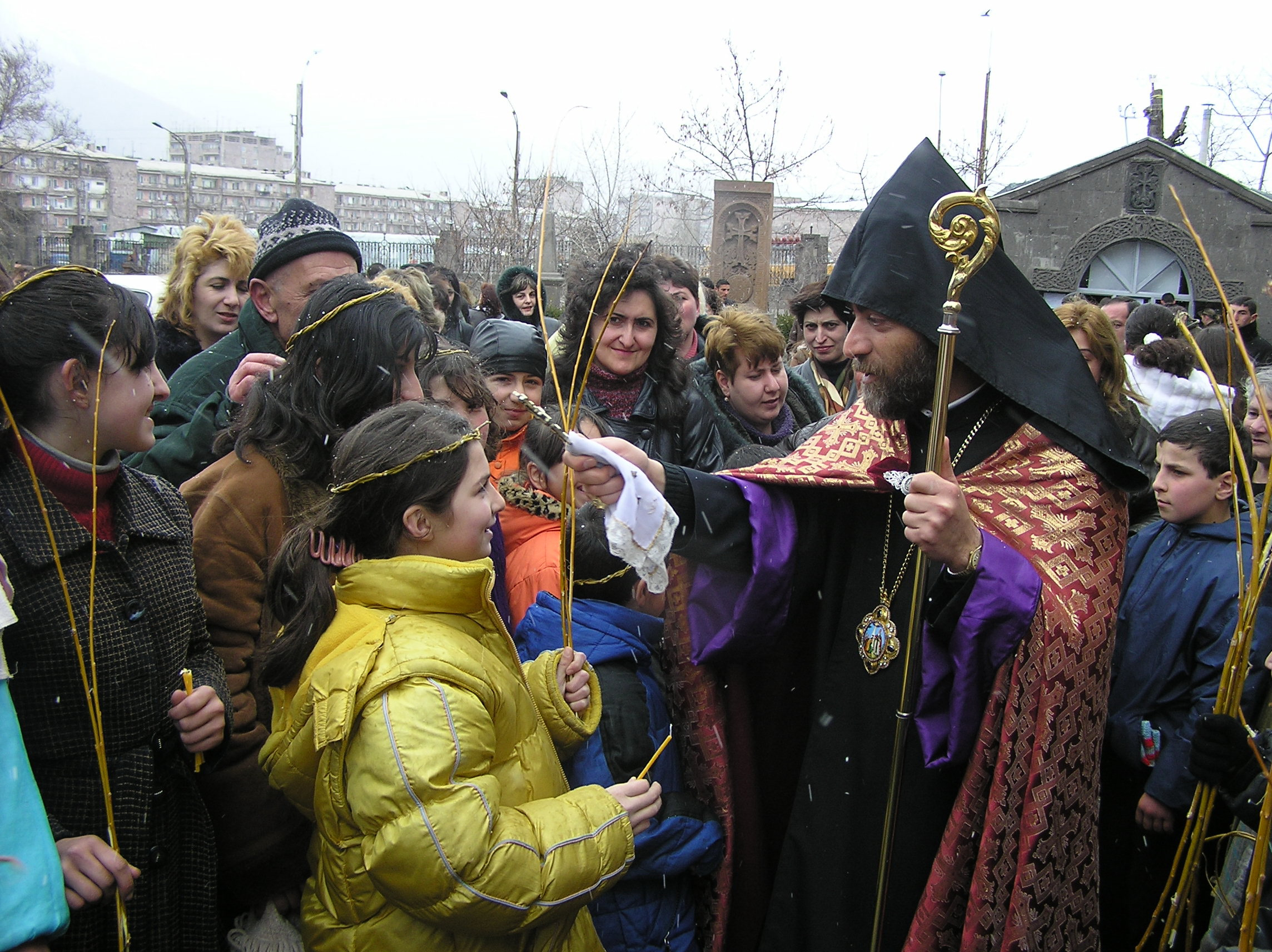
Archbishop Sebouh blessing the faithful

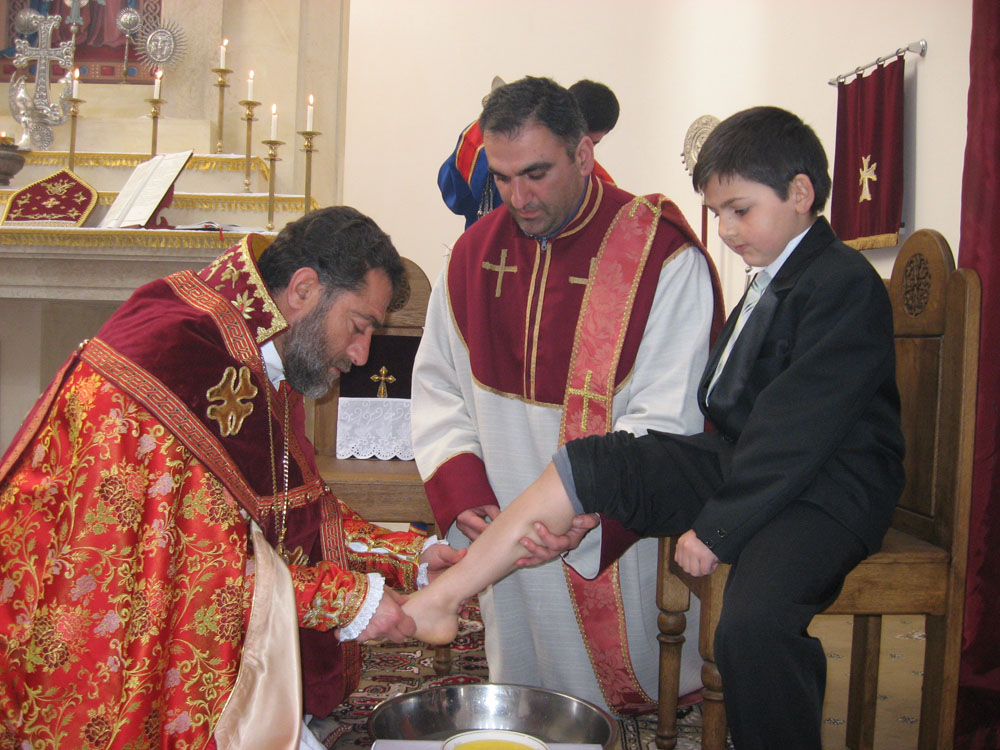
Archbishop Sebouh washing the feet of children during the Washing of Feet ceremony

See also

- Photo gallery of the meeting of the members of the Organization of Istanbul Armenians with Bishop Sebouh at oia.net

== Notes ==
Preceded by n/a	Primate of the Diocese of Gougark; 1996–2020	Vacant
