= Bossey Ecumenical Institute =

Swiss organization

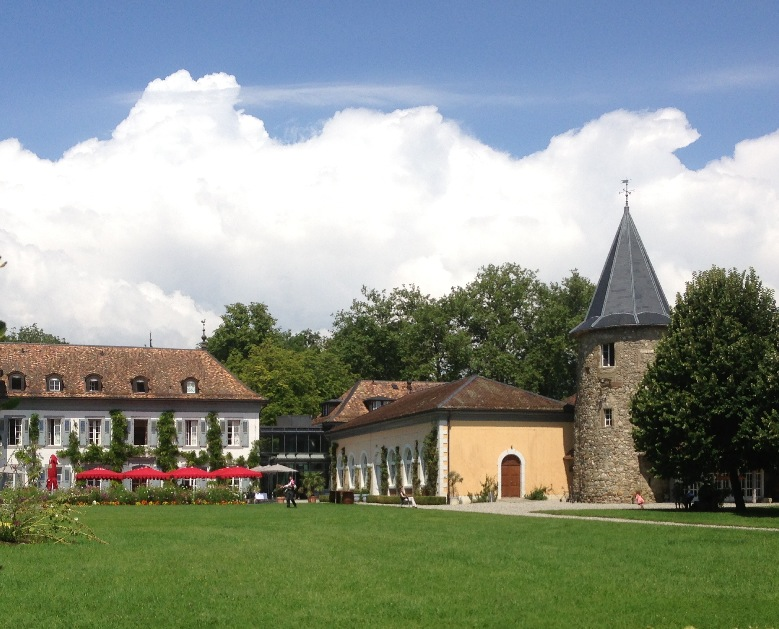
Château de Bossey

The Bossey Ecumenical Institute (Ecumenical Institute Bossey) is the ecumenical institute of the World Council of Churches. It was founded in 1946. The dean of the Institute is the Rev. Dr Simone Sinn. Degrees and other academic awards are accredited by the University of Geneva.

It is situated in Switzerland at the Chateau de Bossey, between the villages of Bogis-Bossey and Céligny, near Geneva.

The institute offers a variety of academic programs and courses in theology, including graduate-level programs in ecumenical studies, interreligious dialogue, and pastoral ministry.

== Academic programmes ==
Students engaging in academic programmes at the Ecumenical Institute study a variety of subjects. These academic modules often include the history of the ecumenical movement, intercultural biblical studies, practical ecumenical theology, and ecumenical study visits. There are often other electives students can take, including courses in biblical hermeneutics, missiology, and social ethics.

- Complementary Certificate in Ecumenical Studies (CCES): This one semester academic programme is for students who hold a bachelor's degree in Christian theology or a related discipline. It is accredited by the University of Geneva and is 30 ECTS (European Credit Transfer and Accumulation System)
- Certificate of Advanced Studies in Ecumenical Studies (CAS): This one semester academic programme is for students who hold a bachelor's degree in Christian theology or a related discipline. It is accredited under the Swiss Higher Education Programme for Continuing Education in accordance with the requirements of the Rectors’ Conference of the Swiss Universities and is 25 ECTS.
- Certificate of Advanced Studies in Interreligious Studies (CAS): This six week programme is intended for young adults who wish to engage in interreligious dialogue. It is accredited by the University of Geneva under the Swiss Higher Education Programme for Continuing Education in accordance with the requirements of the Rectors’ Conference of the Swiss Universities with 10 ECTS.
- Master of Advanced Studies (MAS) in Ecumenical Studies: This two semester academic programme is for students who hold a university Master's degree in Christian theology or a related discipline. It is accredited by the University of Geneva and is 60 ECTS.

== Notable alumni ==
- Nerses Pozapalian

== See also ==
- Willem Visser 't Hooft
- Suzanne de Dietrich
