= Student Christian Movement of Canada =

- Abbreviation: SCM Canada
- Formation: 1895
- Purpose: youth-led Christian ecumenism
- Region served: Canada
- Affiliations: World Student Christian Federation
- Website: www.scmcanada.org

The Student Christian Movement of Canada (SCM Canada) is an ecumenical Progressive Christian student organization in Canada. Its main activities are focused on spirituality, issues of social, economic, and environmental justice, and building autonomous local communities on campuses across the country. It is part of the World Student Christian Federation.

== History ==
In 1895, leaders from North American and European countries established and united national SCMs within the first international student organization, the World Student Christian Federation.

Starting out as at the McGill YMCA, SCM Canada was founded and incorporated into the WSCF in 1921. It is estimated that nearly five percent of students in English Canada were involved in the group from the time of its inception to 1930.

Like its international counterpart, SCM Canada has been part of the ecumenical movement, the turbulence of the 1960s student movements, the mid-20th century shift in balance of power from liberal to evangelical Christian conservatism, the pressures of maintaining unity across the spectrum of Christianity, and the tension between a theological study focus and a social activism focus.

Since its founding, SCM Canada has taken stands on social issues including support for the ordination of women, opposing internment of Japanese-Canadians during World War II; anti-war activities since the 1960s. Members were involved in the Canadian Social Gospel movement, which mobilized for a more just social order in Canada, including accessible health care, education, and social services.

The movement has undertaken various projects throughout its history. The SCM was involved in socialist work camps in the 1940s and 1950s in which students would work in unionizing factories during the summer and pool their resources in communal houses of prayer. This was modeled after the Worker-Priest movement in France. Between 2000 and 2002, summer solidarity projects explored sustainable living in rural community. The SCM also runs international solidarity exchanges with more militant SCMs in the Philippines and Nicaragua and annual student educational trips they call pilgrimages.

The pilgrimage model started with a tour of radical labour and faith organizations in southern Ontario and the north-east USA. Today, SCM Canada travels every November to the gates of the US army base at Fort Benning, Georgia, to protest the human rights abuses of the Western Hemisphere Institute for Security Cooperation (WHINSEC, formerly the School of the Americas).

SCM Canada was investigated by Canadian security services during the Cold War for alleged Communist infiltration because of its positions on economic justice and opposition to nuclear weapons. Some members were linked to the Communist Party of Canada, but the movement denied formal links.

Since the 1990s, SCM Canada has attracted a variety of students, but the network is considerably smaller than in previous decades when mainline Protestant churches were more prominent in Canadian life.

Politically, SCM tends to hold a number of converging political ideologies and outlooks in its ranks, including anarchist and feminist principles of decentralized organizing, liberal concerns with human rights and equality, and emphasis on praxis in integrating theories of social change, theologies, and leftist social activism. Liberation theology has had a major impact on bridging the movement's political and spiritual direction.

Spiritually, SCM members come not only from traditional supporters, the United Church of Canada and the Anglican Church of Canada but also Roman Catholics, Mennonites, some Evangelicals and some non-Christians. Styles of local worship range from contemplative meditation, to monastic styles, praise music and less tradition creative liturgies and ritual.

SCM Canada used to publish an independent magazine, All Things New, twice a year.

== Activities ==
The activities of local SCM movements may be political in nature, such as attending protests or running workshops relating to a variety of social justice issues. Specifically, environmental justice, Indigenous rights, and LGBTQ rights are listed on the SCM website. The movement has a longtime tradition of a commitment to pacifism and an anti-war stance. The SCM also advocates for the rights of migrants and refugees.

Units base their social justice activities within the Christian faith through liberation theology, Bible studies, student-led worship services, and meditation. The national office of the Student Christian Movement offers a variety of social justice themed devotionals and Bible studies available for download. Other events hosted by SCM units are social, including retreats, film festivals, and potluck meals.

Local unit members and its national board gather annually at a national conference, which explores current social or political issues from a Christian ecumenical perspective, and features the highest decision-making body of the movement, National Council, which operates on Consensus decision-making principles.

SCM Canada used to organize an annual pilgrimage to the gates of the US army base at Fort Benning, Georgia to protest human rights abuses of the Western Hemisphere Institute for Security Cooperation (WHINSEC, formerly School of the Americas).

The movement also advocates for LGBTQ people's rights, which began in the mid-1990s with a popular pamphlet, Stop Homophobia in the Churches, which was updated and republished in 2007. In 2006, SCM Canada received a $100,000 US grant from the Liberty Hill Foundation to launch a Queer & Christian Without Contradiction campaign across Canada. In 2009, SCM passed a Resolution on Gender Identity and Sexuality to replace the 1990 Resolution on Sexuality and Homophobia. This new resolution affirmed the holiness, validity, and equal worth of all sexual orientations, gender identities, and gender expressions. The resolution also condemned relationships and expressions that are exploitative, non-consensual, or oppressive.

In 2014, SCM along with the Beansprout Collective launched a three-day Festival called Cahoots Festival: Faith, Justice & DIY. Cahoots holds a series of workshops on social justice and faith issues and well as do-it-yourself projects and crafts. As a multi-generational festival, Cahoots remains the only initiative run by SCM Canada with activities specifically oriented towards children.

== Structure ==
SCM delegates to National Council make decisions by consensus

SCM Canada is a grassroots organization composed of autonomous local unit collectives that associate with each other regionally and across Canada. The Canada-wide body of the movement is associated with regional bodies of the WSCF.

SCM Canada is currently the only student-led affiliate of WSCF in North America, although a North America Regional office was founded in 2007, and SCM-USA is currently being founded by a steering committee, following a regional conference held in San Francisco in January 2009.

The highest decision-making body in the movement is General Council, which convenes every spring at the movement's General Conference. The location rotates between regions. All decisions are made by consensus of all students present, regardless of seniority or experience, and are facilitated by the elected Co-Chairs to the General Board.

=== Local ===
University students run local unit collectives, generally based on some form of consensus decision-making, facilitated by at least one Local Unit Coordinator or Animator (formerly local secretaries), although some groups are completely self-directed. Local units are often allied with campus chaplains, other social activist and/or spiritual/religious groups on campus, and local organizations beyond the academy.

=== Publications ===
Twice a year, SCM Canada used to publish an independent magazine. Each issue addressed a topic decided upon by the movement and included local unit reports, internal communication and discussions about the movement's direction.

SCM used to publish occasionally a theological journal, Epistle.

=== General (Canada-Wide) ===
All SCM members who attend General Conference (usually every May) comprise the General Council of SCM Canada. General Council is the highest decision-making body of SCM Canada. The General Council elects and empowers a General Board of Directors to continue the Movement's business throughout the year.

The Board of Directors of SCM Canada is made up of two Co-Chairs, two regional coordinators (as explained above), and four coordinators who take on the role of various "Desks." These four Desks are the Outreach Coordinator, the Fundraising and Finance Coordinator, the Anti-Oppression Coordinator, and the Communications and Resources Coordinator.

One or two General Secretaries are hired by the General Board to administer, fundraise, assist in Canada-wide programs, and network local units and board members throughout the year. The General Office is currently in Toronto, Ontario.

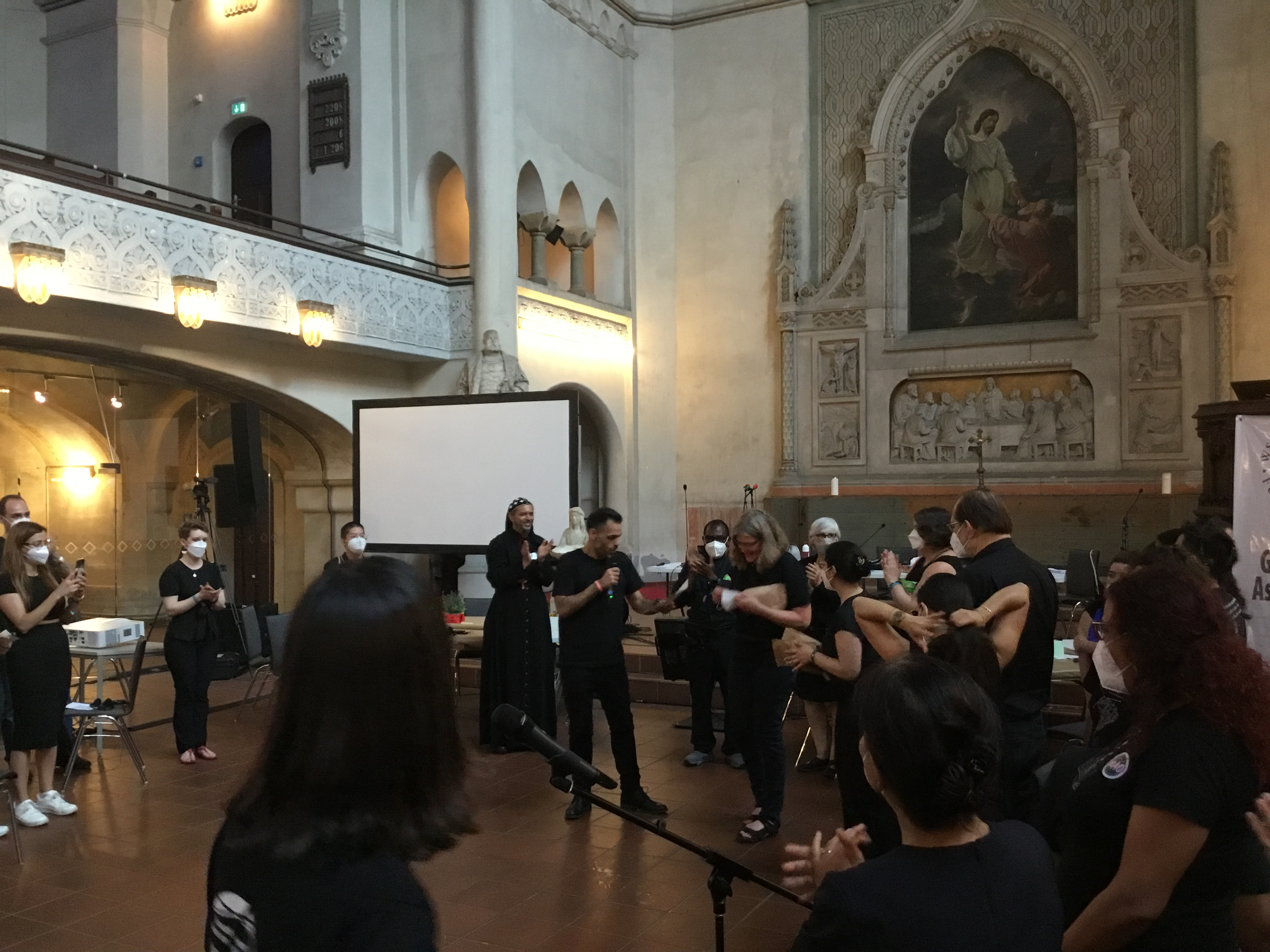
SCM Canada participated in the 37th General Assembly of the World Student Christian Federation in Berlin, Germany.

=== International ===
SCM Canada is part of the North American Region of the WSCF.

The WSCF North American Region includes SCM Canada, Jeunesse Etudiante Chrétienne (Québec), the Lutheran Student Movement(USA), the United Methodist Student Movement (USA) and the U.S. Council for Ecumenical Student Christian Ministry. The North America Regional Office is located in New York, New York. The North America Regional Secretary is Luciano Kovacs.

The Inter-Regional Office of the WSCF is located in Geneva, Switzerland.

== Members ==
Members have included:

- Muriel Duckworth
- James Endicott
- Eugene Forsey
- Stanley Knowles
- Nancy Ruth
- H. B. Sharman
- Audrey Tobias
- Ruth Elizabeth Spence
- Lois Miriam Wilson
- J. S. Woodsworth

== See also ==
Affiliated Organizations

- World Student Christian Federation

Allied Movements & Organizations

- Catholic Worker Movement
- Christian Peacemaker Teams

Ideologies & Philosophies

- Christian anarchism
- Christian communism
- Christian feminism
- Christian left
- Christian socialism
- Ecumenism
- Environmentalism
- Liberation theology
- Postmodern Christianity
- Progressive Christianity
- Social Gospel
- Social justice
