= Wasenbourg =

Rock castle in Alsace, France

Coordinates: 48.960°N 7.616°E

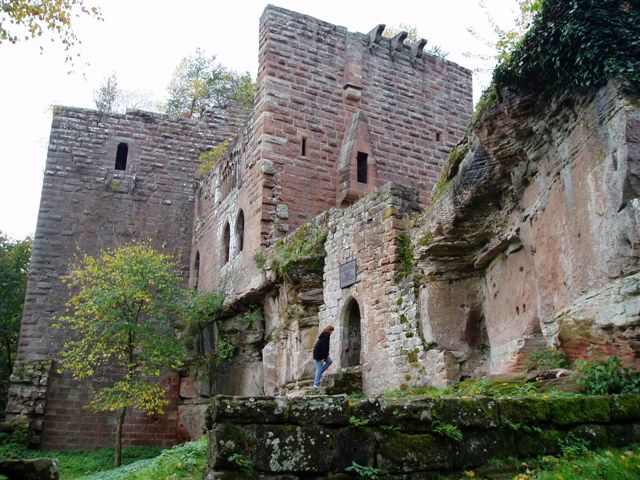
The Wasenbourg (2004)

Wasenbourg (German: Wasenburg), located 400 metres in height on the northwest hillside of Reisberg, is a ruined castle in the North Vosges. It is a recognized historical monument since 1898. Although its origins are fairly obscure, the historians attribute generally its construction, by 1273, to Conrad de Lichtenberg, then bishop of Strasbourg. The castle is located on the territory of the commune of Niederbronn-les-Bains.

== History ==
The castle is quoted first time in a charter dated 1335 during a division of the Licthenberg family possessions. It is enfeoffed by these last ones to Guillaume de Born (or of Burne) in 1378. In 1398, during a Fehde, Wasenbourg is besieged by the gathered troops of the bishop and the city of Strasbourg. Afterward, it will be used as residence by the vassals of the Lichtenberg, notably Hofwart de Kirchheim ( 1407 ) and Simon de Zeiskam ( 1453 ).

With the extinction of the Lichtenberg lineage in 1480, it passes by inheritance to Simon Wecker IV of Two Deux-Ponts-Bitche. Seriously damaged during the Peasants' War in 1525, it will be raised from its ruins by Jacques de Deux-Ponts-Bitche in 1535.

In 1570, a quarrel of inheritance sets Linange against Hanau-Lichtenberg, both of them successors of Deux-Ponts-Bitche. Jean-Jacob Niedheimer, baillif of Hanau, takes advantage of it to occupy the place and assumes even the title of nobility "of Wasenbourg". The castle seems to have been saved during the War of Thirty Years (1618-1648) but will be finally dismantled by the troops of Louis XIV in 1677.

The site was outstandingly emphasized by recent works of consolidation and of restoration. The castle presents the peculiarity not to possess a keep. An 18 metre high, 14 metre long and 3 metre thick shield walloverhanging a deep ditch is enough to protect the lodging house towards the attack. A plate overhanging the entrance of the castle commemorates the visit of Goethe of 1771.

East of the lower yard raises a rock known as "le Wachtfelsen", testimony of a Roman worship dedicated to the god Mercury. Having crossed the lower yard, we penetrate into the enclosure wall itself. An oriel window overhangs the East wall of the castle. The access to the lodging house is made by a door in broken bow overhung by a sculptured head integrated into a Gothic frieze.
