= Küss =

Küss is a surname. Notable people by that name include:

- Émile Küss (1815–1871), French physician.
- Georges Albert Küss (1867–1936), French physiologist. Head of laboratory at Trousseau Hospital.
- Georges Küss (1877–1967), French surgeon.
- René Küss (1913–2006), French urologist.
