= Diocese of Gougark =

Diocese of Gougark Գուգարաց թեմ
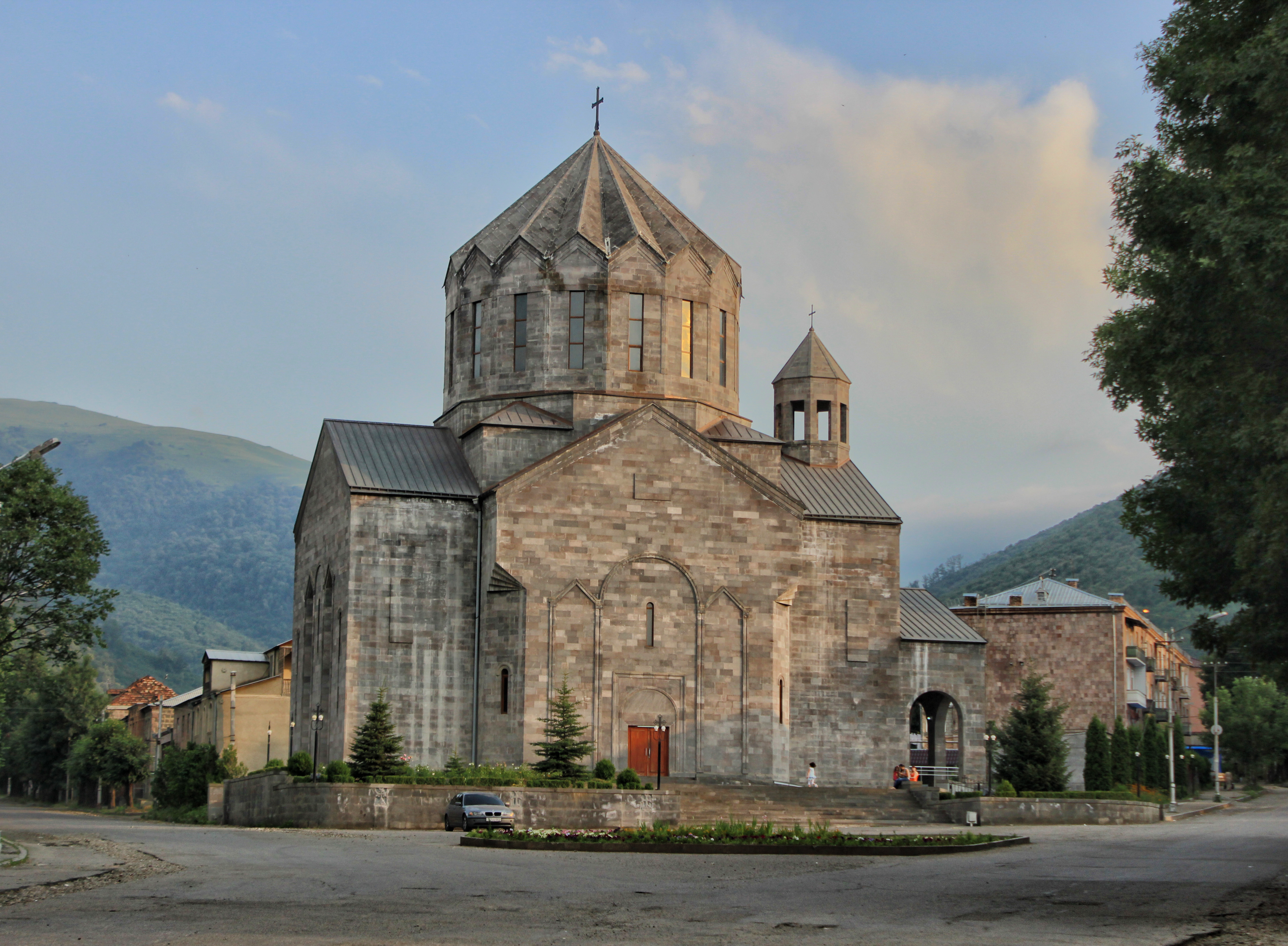
- Saint Gregory of Narek Cathedral, Vanadzor

Location
- Country: Armenia
- Ecclesiastical province: Lori

Statistics
- Churches: 36 churches 19 chapels 3 monasteries

Information
- Cathedral: Saint Gregory of Narek Cathedral, Vanadzor
- Secular priests: 14

Current leadership
- Primate: Archbishop Sebouh Chouldjian

The Diocese of Gougark (Armenian: Գուգարաց թեմ Gougarats t'em), is a diocese of the Armenian Apostolic Church encompassing the northern Lori Province of Armenia. It is named after the historic province of Gugark; the 13th province of the Kingdom of Armenia. The modern-day province of Lori was one of the cantons of historic Gugark. The diocesan headquarters are located in the city of Vanadzor. The seat of the bishop is the Saint Gregory of Narek Cathedral. Until December 2010, the churches of Tavush Province were under the jurisdiction of the Diocese of Gougark, when the new Diocese of Tavush was founded by Catholicos Karekin II.

The Diocese includes 29 working churches with 14 full-time priests.

== History ==
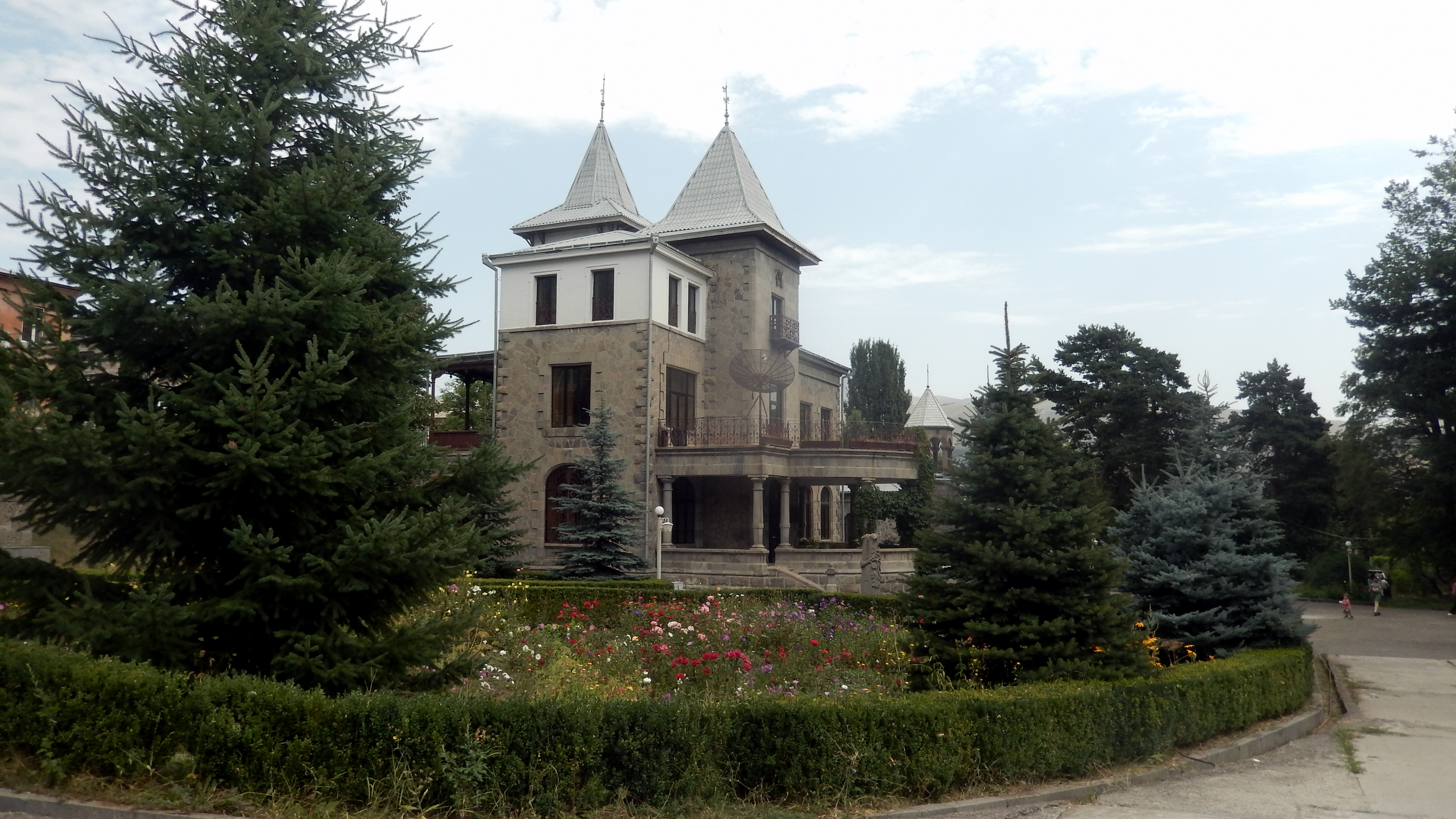
The prelacy building

During the times of Soviet rule, the region of Lori was included within the Shirak Diocese. The St. Mary (Holy Mother of God) Church of Vanadzor and St. Sarkis Church of Stepanavan were both operating at that time. At the end of the 20th century with the independence of Armenia, the Catholicos of All Armenians Vazgen I started reorganizing the regions and the Dioceses of the Armenian Church to enable them to operate more effectively. This work was continued by the Catholicos of All Armenians Karekin I.

On April 15, 1990, the historical Haghpat Monastery was reopened and Rev. Fr. Yeznik Petrossian was appointed as the Parish priest.

In 1991, the Diocese of Gougark was officially established by the Pontifical Encyclical of Vazken I. It included today's region of Tavush and the town Alaverdi. Archbishop Arsen Berberian was appointed the Primate; the headquarters were located in the town of Dilijan. Later, the seat of the bishop was moved to the Holy Mother of God Church of Vanadzor. Finally, in 2005, the seat was moved to the newly built Saint Gregory of Narek Cathedral.

The Diocese was reorganized again on May 30, 1996 by Catholicos Karekin I to include the entire regions of Lori and Tavush (containing the major towns of Vanadzor, Spitak, Stepanavan, Tashir, Alaverdi, Tumanyan, Ijevan, Berd, Dilijan, and Noyemberyan). However, since December 2010, the diocese includes the churches of Lori Province only.

== Present day ==
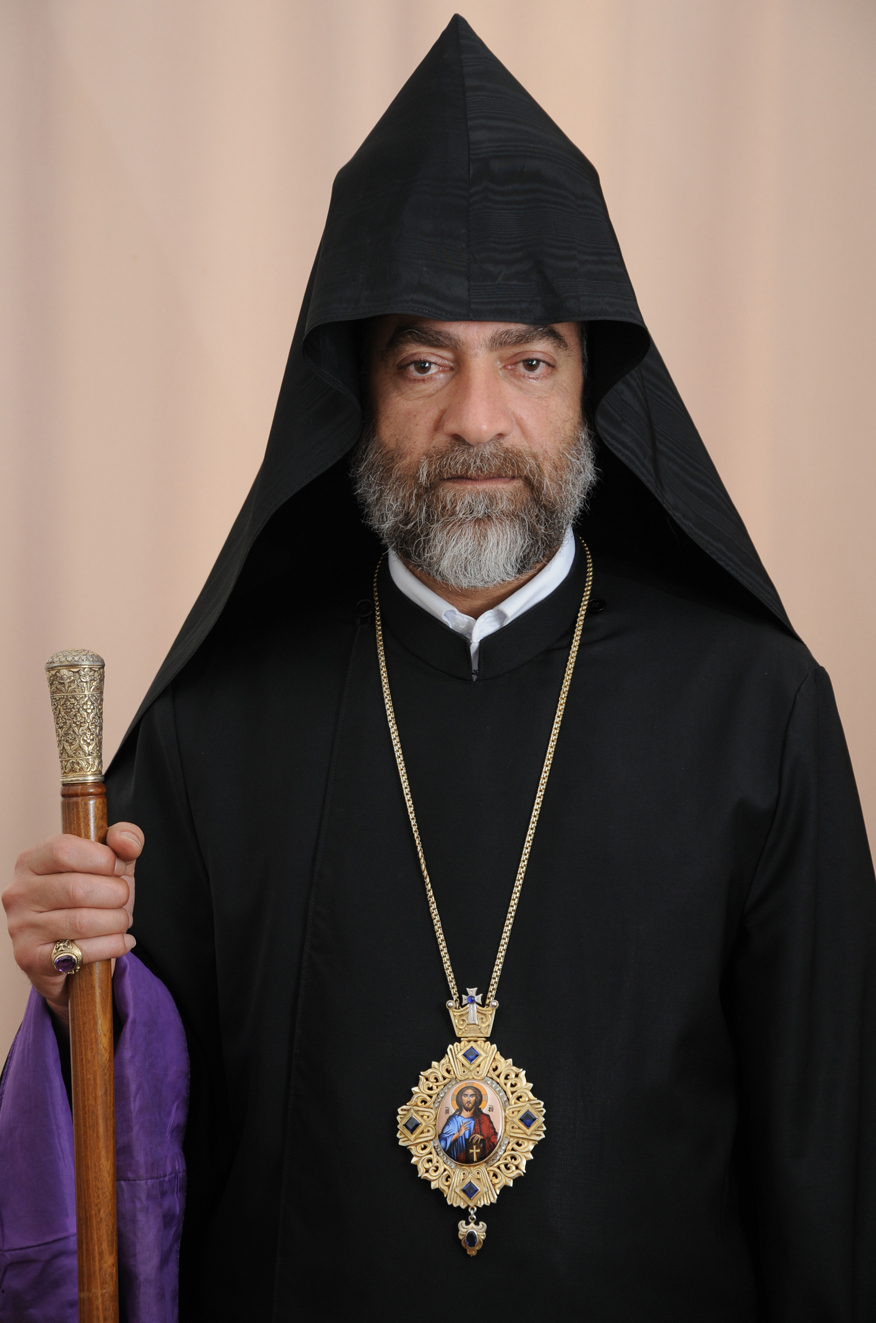
Archbishop Sebouh Chouldjian, Primate of the Diocese of Gougark

At the time, Archbishop Sebouh Chouldjian (who was then an Archamandrite) from Malatya, Turkey, was appointed to serve as the Primate of the Diocese of Gougark by the Pontifical Encyclical of the Catholicos. Due to his continuing efforts and dedicated work, various difficulties could have been overcome in the Diocese. Archbishop Sebouh Chouldjian is serving as the Primate of the Diocese of Gougark since June 3, 1996.

Various forgotten feasts and traditions have gradually been re-established. In all, the working churches of the Diocese acolyte classes have been created. They work and continuously offer liturgies and other services. With the help and support of the Mother See of Holy Etchmiadzin, organizations and individual benefactors from Armenia and the Diaspora, various preaching, church-building, reconstruction and social service programs have been completed.
