= Kırıkhan =

- District and municipality
- Logo

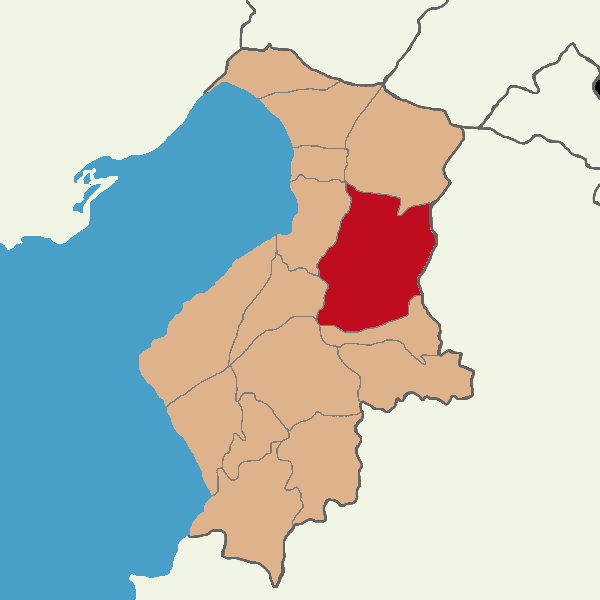
- Map showing Kırıkhan District in Hatay Province

- Location within Turkey
- Coordinates: 36°29′51″N 36°21′39″E
- Country: Turkey
- Province: Hatay

Government
  - Mayor: Ömer Erdal Çelik (AKP)
- Area: 715 km^{2} (276 sq mi)
- Elevation: 151 m (495 ft)
- Population (2022): 121,028
  - Density: 169/km^{2} (438/sq mi)
- Time zone: UTC+3 (TRT)
- Postal code: 31440
- Area code: 0326
- Website: www.kirikhan.bel.tr

Kırıkhan is a municipality and district of Hatay Province, Turkey. Its area is 715 km^{2}, and its population is 121,028 (2022). The town stands at the intersection of the route between İskenderun and Aleppo, and the major north-south road between Antakya and Kahramanmaraş. As of 2014, over 35,000 Syrians live in Kırıkhan, an increase from the May 2013 number of 30,000.

The district’s major religious and touristic site is the Beyazid-i Bestami Külliyesi (Complex) on Darb-ı Sak Castle at Alabeyli village, which contains the tomb or maqam of Bayazid Bastami. The ruined medieval Crusader castle Trapessac is situated near Kırıkhan.

== Name ==
The name Kırıkhan means "broken inn" in the Turkish language, perhaps a reference to one of the many lodgings that once lined the road. In Levantine Arabic, karakhane can refer either to a silk factory or a whorehouse.

== History ==
In the 1200s BC, the Kingdom of Hattena was established with its center in Kanula (modern day Çatalhöyük, near Kırıkhan).

English traveller Mark Sykes recorded Kırıkhan as a town inhabited by Turkmen in early 20th century.

During the Ottoman Era, the town was part of the district of Belen. However, under the French Mandate, Kırıkhan became one of the three districts of Liwa' Iskenderun (alongside Antakya and Iskenderun).

The Battle of Boklukaya, which took place between Kırıkhan and Hassa in September 1920, between regular and reinforced French troops and Turkish gangs with military reinforcements, resulted in the victory of the Turkish groups.

In 1909, violence against Armenians spread to the area northwest of Aleppo as part of the Adana Massacres.

In 1938, Kırıkhan was annexed to Turkey with the rest of Liwa' Iskenderun, with Turkish troops entering on the 6th of July. This was only made official on the 29th of June, 1939.

Kırıkhan was heavily damaged by powerful earthquakes in February 2023 and subsequent aftershocks.

== Agriculture ==
Kırıkhan, as an agricultural region, relies heavily on agriculture for the population’s income. While livestock farming was the primary source of income before the 1980s, the fertile lands reclaimed from the draining of Lake Amik have led farmers to turn to growing crops such as cotton, wheat, and corn.

Kırıkhan boasts the largest land area in the province, as well as the largest irrigable land area. Rich in nutrients and suitable for all types of agriculture, these agricultural lands are primarily cultivated for cotton, wheat, and corn. Furthermore, thanks to the District Directorate of Agriculture’s extension efforts, in recent years, Kırıkhan farmers have embraced tunnel and open-field melon farming, open-field vegetable farming, and second-crop corn farming. Their economic importance has led to their widespread and increasing cultivation.

== Climate ==
Its average summer temperature is 32.3 °C, and its average winter temperature is 7.3 °C. Its climate is typically Mediterranean, with mild, rainy winters and hot, dry summers.

== Composition ==
There are 73 neighbourhoods in Kırıkhan District:

- 408 Evler
- Abalaklı
- Adalar
- Aktutan
- Alaybeyli
- Alibeyçağıllı
- Alparslan
- Alsancak
- Arkıtça
- Aydınlı
- Aygırgölü
- Bahçelievler
- Balarmudu
- Baldıran
- Barbaros
- Başpınar
- Bektaşlı
- Çamsarı
- Çamseki
- Camuzkışlası
- Çankaya
- Çataltepe
- Ceylanlı
- Çiloğlanhüyüğü
- Cumhuriyet
- Danaahmetli
- Dedeçınar
- Delibekirli
- Demirkonak
- Fatih
- Gazi
- Gölbaşı
- Gültepe
- Gündüz
- Güventaşı
- Güzelce
- İçada
- Ilıkpınar
- İncirli
- Kaletepe
- Kamberlikaya
- Kamışlar
- Kangallar
- Karaçağıl
- Karadurmuşlu
- Karaelmaslı
- Karamağara
- Karamankaşı
- Karataş
- Kazkeli
- Kızılkaya
- Kodallı
- Kurtlusarımazı
- Kurtlusoğuksu
- Kurtuluş
- Mahmutlu
- Menderes
- Mimarsinan
- Muratpaşa
- Narlıhopur
- Özkızılkaya
- Özsoğuksu
- Özyörük
- Reşatlı
- Saylak
- Söğütlüöz
- Sucuköy
- Taşoluk
- Topboğazı
- Torun
- Yalangoz
- Yeni
- Yılanlı

== Notable people ==
- Nerses Pozapalian, senior bishop of the Armenian Apostolic Church
- Oğuzhan Matur, footballer
