= Lois Wilson (minister) =

Canadian cleric and politician (1927–2024)

The Very Reverend and Honourable Lois Wilson CC OOnt

Moderator of the United Church of Canada
- In office 1980–1982
- Preceded by: George M. Tuttle
- Succeeded by: W. Clarke MacDonald

Canadian Senator from Ontario
- In office 1998–2002

Chancellor of Lakehead University
- In office 1990–2000

Personal details
- Born: Lois Miriam Freeman; April 8, 1927 Winnipeg, Manitoba, Canada
- Died: September 13, 2024 (aged 97) Fredericton, New Brunswick, Canada
- Party: Independent
- Spouse: Roy Wilson (m. 1950; died 2005)
- Children: 4
- Education: University of Winnipeg

Lois Miriam Wilson CC OOnt (née Freeman; April 8, 1927 – September 13, 2024) was a minister of the United Church of Canada who served as the first female Moderator of the United Church (1980–1982), the first woman president of the Canadian Council of Churches (1976–1979), and the first woman president of the World Council of Churches (1983–1991). Wilson also served in the Canadian Senate for four years (1998–2002).

== Early life and education ==
Lois Miriam Freeman was born in Winnipeg in 1927, the daughter of the Rev. E.G.D. (Gard) Freeman, a minister, and Ada Freeman, a teacher. Lois was born into the United Church of Canada — her father had been a Presbyterian minister, but had become a minister of the newly formed United Church when Methodists, Presbyterians and Congregationalists had amalgamated two years before Lois's birth. Her father would go on to became a professor and dean of theology at United College, Winnipeg.

Lois followed her father's footsteps, attending United College and graduating from the University of Winnipeg with a Bachelor of Arts degree in 1947 and a Master of Divinity in 1950. While attending university, she was active in the Student Christian Movement of Canada as Student President in Manitoba (1944–46) as well as on the national level, and remained active later in life in the World Student Christian Federation. She also attended Theological Seminary in New York. Following graduation in 1950, she married Roy Wilson.

== Minister ==
Wilson was ordained a minister in the United Church of Canada in 1965, her husband Roy having previously been ordained a United Church minister. She served in team ministry with her husband in United Church pastoral charges in Winnipeg, (1954–60), Thunder Bay, (1960–69), Hamilton (1969–78) and Kingston (1978–80).

From 1983 to 1989 she served as co-director of the Ecumenical Forum of Canada and also served as the first woman president of the Canadian Council of Churches (1976–1979) as well as the first woman president of the World Council of Churches (1983–1991).

== Moderator ==
At the 28th General Council of the United Church in 1980, Wilson was elected as the 28th Moderator, becoming the first woman to serve in that role since the founding of the United Church. Julie McGonegal, writing for Broadview, noted that during her time as Moderator, "Wilson brought an unprecedented focus on peace, environmental stewardship and human rights. Her leadership style was confident yet collaborative and informed by her belief that faith communities should be at the forefront of social change. To that end, Wilson led the United Church into deeper conversations about nuclear disarmament, gender equality and the elimination of poverty, both at home and abroad."

== Public service ==
From 1967 to 1968, Wilson was the director of Town Talk, Thunder Bay, an innovative ecumenically sponsored program, utilizing all media, inviting citizens to publicly discuss issues affecting the future of their city. In 1984, she was a commentator for the CBC during the Apostolic Visit of Pope John Paul II to Canada.

From 1990 to 2000, Wilson was the Chancellor of Lakehead University.

In 1998 Wilson was appointed to the Senate of Canada upon the recommendation of then prime minister Jean Chrétien, and served in the chamber as an Independent. In 2000, she led Canada's first parliamentary delegation to North Korea to begin the process of establishing formal diplomatic relations. She retired from the Senate in 2002.

Wilson held several other Canadian government appointments, including as Canada's envoy to Sudan, and as a panel member of Environmental Assessment of the Disposal of Nuclear Waste (1989–1997).

She also served as Ecumenist in Residence at the Toronto School of Theology, a Fellow of Massey College, International Co-President of the World Federalist Movement.

At the time of her death, she was Distinguished Minister in Residence at Emmanuel College at Victoria University in the University of Toronto.

== Author ==
Wilson was the author of ten books including, Turning the World Upside Down: A Memoir (Toronto: Doubleday Canada, 1989) and I Want to Be in That Number - Cool Saints I Have Known (Toronto: self-published, 2014). She also wrote the first chapter of Transforming the Faiths of our Fathers: Women who Changed American Religion (2004), edited by Ann Braude.

== Personal life and death ==
Roy and Lois Wilson, married in 1950, had four children, twelve grandchildren and eight great-grandchildren.

A close friend of novelist Margaret Laurence, Wilson participated in several public forums with Laurence and presided at Laurence's 1986 funeral.

Wilson died at a hospital in Fredericton, New Brunswick, on September 13, 2024, at the age of 97.

== Awards ==
Wilson received 14 honorary degrees for her work in human rights, ecumenism, and social justice, including one from the United States. She also received a number of other honours and awards:

- Queen's 25th Anniversary Medal (1977),
- Pearson Peace Medal (1985),
- Officer of the Order of Canada (1984) and Companion of the Order of Canada (2003)
- Order of Ontario (1991)
- Joseph Cardinal Bernardin Award for Christian Unity (2010),
- Heart and Vision Award (2011).
- Wilson was a director of the Canadian Civil Liberties Association, who honoured her in 2014 for her public engagement.

Religious titles
Preceded by George M. Tuttle	Moderator of the United Church of Canada; 1980–1982	Succeeded by W. Clarke MacDonald
