= Alphonse-Marie Eppinger =

German religious (1814–1867)

Blessed Alphonse-Marie Eppinger SDR
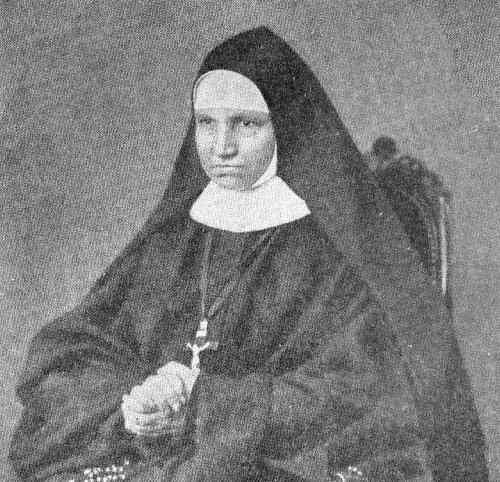
- Born: 9 September 1814; Niederbronn-les-Bains, Bas-Rhin, Bourbon Restoration
- Died: 31 July 1867 (aged 52); Niederbronn-les-Bains, Bas-Rhin, Second French Empire
- Venerated in: Roman Catholic Church
- Beatified: 9 September 2018, Strasbourg Cathedral, Strasbourg, France by Cardinal Giovanni Angelo Becciu
- Feast: 9 September

Alphonse-Marie Eppinger (9 September 1814 – 31 July 1867), SDR, born Elisabeth Eppinger, was a French Catholic nun and the founder of the Sisters of the Divine Redeemer.

Eppinger's cause for sainthood was opened on 30 August 2005 and she was declared Venerable on 19 December 2011 after Pope Benedict XVI confirmed her life of heroic virtue. Pope Francis confirmed a miracle attributed to her in 2018; the beatification was celebrated in Strasbourg on 9 September 2018.

== Life ==
Élisabeth Eppinger was born in France on 9 September 1814 as the eldest of eleven children to poor farmers. She suffered from various ailments during her childhood and was noted for her ardent faith in God.

Her parish priest Jean-David Reichard (1796–1867) knew of her desire to establish a religious congregation and aided her in finding companions for her project. In 1846 she saw a vision of Jesus Christ and this began a series of ecstasies she soon became known as "the Niederbronn Ecstatic". But Reichard also learned of her ecstasies and felt obligated to inform his bishop of this. The Bishop of Strasbourg Andreas Raess heard of her from Reichard and met her in July 1848 to conduct tests and interviews with her while being convinced of her intentions to serve the ill and the poor. Raess also believed that God had called Eppinger for a special mission. Father Claude Ignatius Busson published a series of writings on her – three sets – from 1849 until 1853 in response to these ecstasies.

On 28 August 1849, she founded the Sisters of the Divine Redeemer after renouncing her dream of joining the Sisters of Ribeauvillé; she became the congregation's first superior. Her order received diocesan approval around that time. She made her religious vows on 2 January 1850 in the religious name of "Alphonse-Marie". Eppinger placed her order under the patronage of Alphonsus Maria de' Liguori. The congregation received the decree of praise from Pope Pius IX in 1863 and received full pontifical approval in 1866; the order had 700 sisters in 83 houses in 1863. It had received the imperial approval of Napoleon III in 1854 while during the cholera pandemic of 1854 using her order to tend to victims.

Eppinger died in 1867 in the same week as Reichard. Cardinal Willem Marinus van Rossum – in August 1931 – said: "You have a foundress who is a saint!" Her remains were exhumed on 8 November 1950. Her order expanded to nations such as Argentina and in Angola gained 150 religious in 19 communities.

== Beatification ==
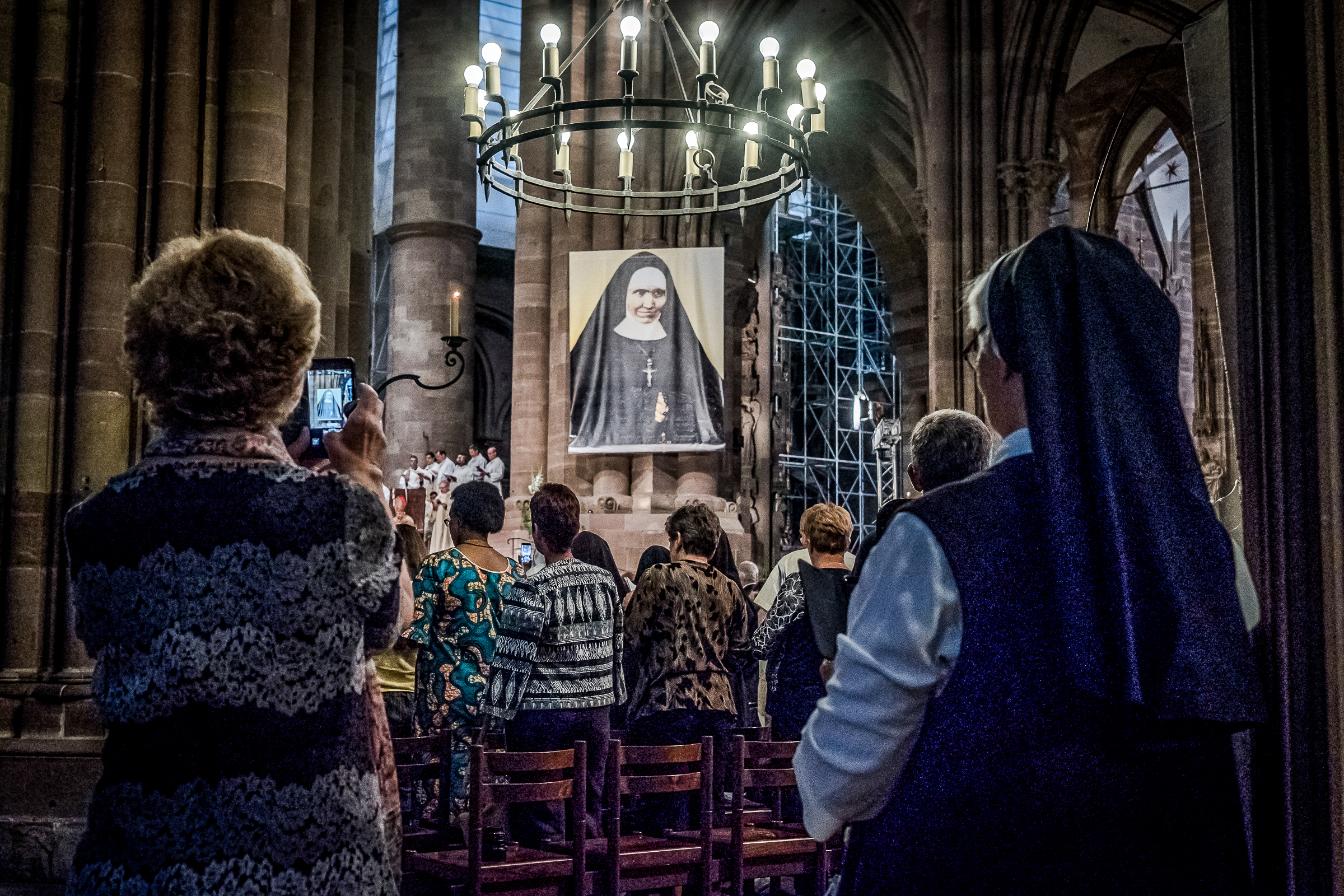
Beatification mass held in Strasbourg on 9 September 2018.

The beatification process opened in Strasbourg in an informative process that commenced on 29 January 1951 and concluded its business on 12 January 1955 while theologians voiced approval to her spiritual writings on 6 July 1963. The cause remained inactive for several decades while a decree from the Congregation for the Causes of Saints on 30 August 2005 resumed the cause and granted "nihil obstat" ('nothing against') to the continuation of the cause while giving her the posthumous title of Servant of God. A second process opened on 7 June 2006 and closed on 25 June 2007 while the C.C.S. validated the process in Rome on 29 February 2008. A relator to the cause was appointed on 7 May 2008.

The postulation submitted the Positio in two parts in 2009 and in 2010 while historians voted in favor of the cause on 1 December 2009 and consulting theologians did so as well on 29 January 2011; the C.C.S. approved the cause also on 18 October 2011. Pope Benedict XVI – on 19 December 2011 – proclaimed her to be Venerable after acknowledging her heroic virtue.

The miracle required for her beatification was scrutinized in the place it occurred in and received C.C.S. validation on 10 October 2008. Pope Francis later confirmed this miracle in 2018. She was beatified in Strasbourg Cathedral by Congregation for the Causes of Saints Prefect Cardinal Giovanni Angelo Becciu on 9 September 2018. Following her beatification, Pope Francis openly applauded and praised Eppinger's life during his weekly Sunday Angelus in the Vatican around the same time that the beatification Mass was being celebrated.

The current postulator for this cause is Sister Katharina Maria Kristofova.
