= H. B. Sharman =

Canadian Christian theologian (1865–1953)

Henry Burton Sharman (1865–1953) was a Canadian Christian theologian.

== Biography ==
Henry Burton Sharman was born 12 August 1865, in Stratford, Ontario, the eldest of eleven children. After attending school in Stratford, Sharman entered the Ontario Agricultural College (OAC) at Guelph in 1882 where he received a Diploma in Animal Husbandry and Veterinary Science in 1884. He traveled to England while at Guelph to import Hereford cattle. In 1885 he worked as a book-keeper at his father's foundry. In the following year, the family moved to Manitoba where his father and uncles had purchased large tracts of farm land. After a brief stint of farming, Sharman attended a normal school in Winnipeg and taught for one year in Birtle, Manitoba, before returning to the OAC in Guelph in 1890. He received his B.Sc. degree in 1891 and stayed on for two years as an instructor in chemistry.

Showing considerably more interest in agriculture and business than in religion during his youth, Sharman was profoundly affected by the visit of T. H. Crossley, a Methodist evangelist, to Stratford in 1884 at a time when the Protestant churches of North America were being swept by religious revivals. He soon became a leader in church work and was active in student Christian life, joining the YMCA at the OAC. During his final years there, John R. Mott, noted American evangelist and founder of the Student Volunteer Movement (SVM) for Foreign Missions, discovered Henry with the result that he left his teaching position to move to Chicago to join the staff of the SVM. From 1893 to 1900, Henry worked as Corresponding Secretary for the SVM and as Bible Study Secretary for the Student Department of the International Committee of YMCAs. During this period, he published his first book, "Studies in the Life of Christ" (1896), based on his experiences leading student Bible classes. This book was later translated into Chinese (1905) by Sarah Peters, Missionary of the Woman's Foreign Missionary Society of the Methodist Episcopal Church serving in Nanking, China for use in training Chinese Christian leaders. In 1896, he married Abbie Lyon, also employed as a secretary for the SVM.

As his personal study of the gospels deepened, Sharman began to distance himself from the SVM claim for "the evangelization of the world in this generation," although it would take him a further lifetime of study before he could adequately prove to himself from scripture (articulated in "Son of Man and Kingdom of God: a critical study", his only post-doctoral work that was not entirely a book of unanswered questions) that Jesus' view of the kingdom of God was not apocalyptic. He and Abby left the employ of the YMCA and SVM and both returned to school to gain a doctorate.

Henry entered graduate studies in 1900 in the Department of New Testament History and Literature at the University of Chicago where he studied church history, modern and ancient languages, theology and ethics, and Old and New Testament studies, and was particularly influenced by his contact with Professor Ernest De Witt Burton; he was also a contemporary of Edgar J. Goodspeed and Shailer Mathews. He received his Ph.D. in 1906 and was retained by the Divinity School at the University of Chicago as a lecturer for several years. His dissertation, "The Teachings of Jesus About the Future", was published and widely reviewed in 1909. An advocate of the new "higher criticism", which encouraged the application of the critical methods of historians, scientists, and literary critics to the Bible, Henry found that his modern liberal views made him popular with students but often created difficulties with his more conservative colleagues and he felt increasingly uncomfortable in an academic setting. In 1909 he left the University of Chicago to return to Canada; in future he would hold university positions on an honorary basis only.

As a way of achieving financial independence that would enable him to pursue his religious vocation in his own way, with associates R. W. Gladstone and his brother-in-law, John N. Lyon, he helped found the Ontario Metal Culvert Company based in Guelph, Ontario, which became the Canada Ingot Iron Company in 1915. Henry Burton Sharman served as President from 1908 to 1920, and as a member of the Board of Directors until 1931; after only six years his goal of financial independence had been achieved.

During these early years of intense involvement in his business when he traveled back and forth across the country, Henry did not lose contact with students. He remained intimately involved with the Canadian student YMCAs and YWCAs as a leader of Bible study classes and, after its formation in 1920, with the Student Christian Movement of Canada, also holding a position as part-time lecturer at the University of Toronto.

After 1914 Sharman devoted several years to the writing, publishing his own parallel version of the New Testament Gospels in 1917, which he titled Records of the Life of Jesus. The synoptic gospels (Matthew, Mark, and Luke) are arranged side by side in sequential order to highlight their similarities and differences. The Gospel of John is included separately, as it has a different makeup and few direct parallels. He developed a unique seminar format for studying the Records, one which involved the Socratic method of using probing questions to engage the gospel materials.

In 1922 Sharman attended the meeting of the World's Student Christian Federation in Peking (Beijing), China, on behalf of the Student Christian Movement of Canada. Beginning in Canada in 1923, he led seminars, which became six-week-long intensive studies. Students from around the world would come to study the records of the life of Jesus, devoting the full morning of each day to the work. The emphasis was on the "Jesus of history" rather than the "Christ of faith." Sharman was something of an iconoclast, and challenged his students to seek to do God's will regardless of tradition, institutions or the potential cost of acting against doctrinal edicts. From 1925 to 1946 Sharman conducted a yearly 6-week wilderness Bible retreat at remote Camp Minnesing in Algonquin Park, where he trained religious leaders from around the globe.

In 1926 Henry Sharman returned to China where he remained for three years as an exchange professor in the History Department at Yenching University in Peking. This was followed by a move to Wallingford, Pennsylvania, to accept an invitation to teach at Pendle Hill, a graduate school conducted by the Society of Friends. In 1933 he retired to California, continuing to conduct classes in the study of Jesus at YMCA conferences at Asilomar, California, and other locations.

Many of his students went on to lead groups in universities and retreat centers. Groups that carried on his seminar method included Pendle Hill, Sequoia Seminars, and the Guild for Psychological Studies . Among his Canadian students who were influential were the controversial missionaries to China, the Endicotts, James Gareth Endicott and his wife Mary Austin Endicott, and Muriel Duckworth, the tireless peace activist. He was also influential in the life and teaching of his famous Unitarian sister-in-law, Sophia Lyon Fahs. Cyrus Leroy Baldridge, an important illustrator and activist, but not a Christian, remembered of his time at the University of Chicago that "I slipped through, really working in only one course, 'The Life of Jesus,' wherein Professor Sharman made the analytical method so exciting that a few of us actually exercised our minds." One sociological study of Sharman's influence made much of a split in his students that occurred in the late 1940s and continued after his death, some focusing on transformation of the individual, and others the transformation of society.

== Bibliography ==
In addition to Records of the Life of Jesus, Sharman published Studies in the Life of Christ (1896); The Teachings of Jesus about the Future, according to the Synoptic Gospels (1909); Jesus in the Records (1918); Jesus as Teacher (1935); Studies in the Records of the Life of Jesus (1938); Son of Man and Kingdom of God: A Critical Study (1943) and Paul as Experient (1945), he also supervised the translation of some of his works into Chinese and Japanese.

All are currently out of print, except for Records of the Life of Jesus, which has been reprinted by the Guild for Psychological Studies. Sharman's original version used the English Revised Version of the gospel text, published in 1881. In 1991, the Guild for Psychological Studies published a new edition, based on the Revised Standard Version.

Some of Sharman's out-of-print books are available in ebook format:

- (1896) Studies in the Life of Christ djvu
- (1909) The teaching of Jesus about the future according to the synoptic gospels djvu
- (1917) Records of the Life of Jesus djvu
- (1918) Jesus in the Records pdf
- (1935) Jesus as Teacher pdf (HTML)
