= Niederbronn-les-Bains =

- Commune
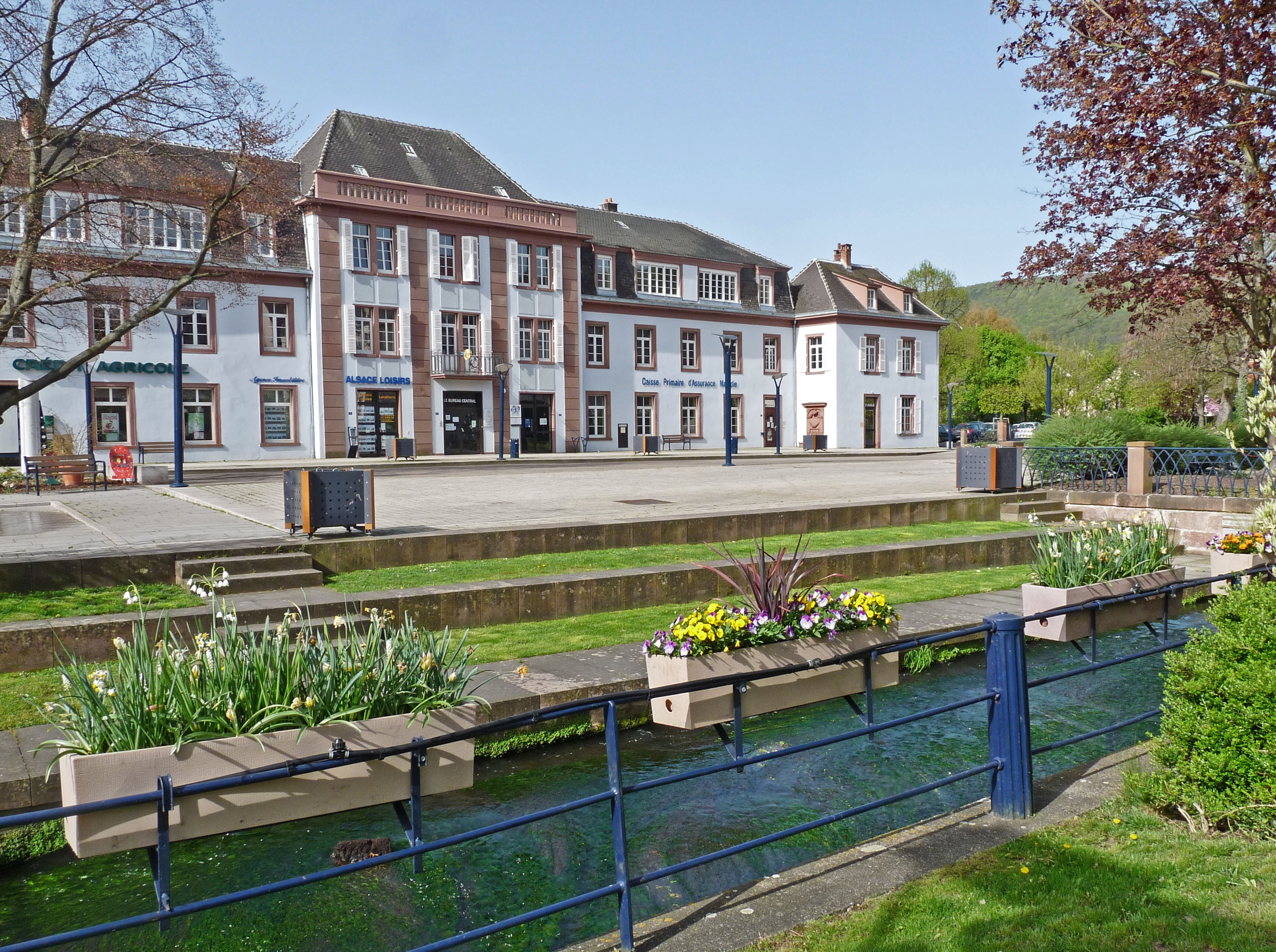
- Former De Dietrich central office and Falkensteinerbach river

- Coat of arms
- Location of Niederbronn-les-Bains
- Location within France Location within Grand Est
- Coordinates: 48°57′N 7°38′E
- Country: France
- Region: Grand Est
- Department: Bas-Rhin
- Arrondissement: Haguenau-Wissembourg
- Canton: Reichshoffen

Government
  - Mayor (2020–2026): Anne Guillier
- Area^{1}: 31.4 km^{2} (12.1 sq mi)
- Elevation: 192 m (630 ft)
- Highest elevation: 577 m (1,893 ft)
- Lowest elevation: 180 m (590 ft)
- Population (2023): 4,347
  - Density: 138/km^{2} (359/sq mi)
- Time zone: UTC+01:00 (CET)
  - Summer (DST): UTC+02:00 (CEST)
- INSEE/Postal code: 67324 /67110
- Website: Official website
- ^{1} French Land Register data, which excludes lakes, ponds, glaciers > 1 km^{2} (0.386 sq mi or 247 acres) and river estuaries.

Niederbronn-les-Bains (French pronunciation: [nidəʁbʁɔn le bɛ̃]; German: Bad Niederbronn) is a commune in the Bas-Rhin department in Grand Est in north-eastern France. It is positioned between Bitche and Wissembourg, close to the current frontier with Germany.

Niederbronn-les-Bains is part of the Northern Vosges Regional Natural Park. It has a tradition as a spa town, and continues to attract tourists and other visitors needing to recuperate.

== History ==
Niederbronn-les-Bains was founded in 48 BC when the Romans discovered the healing properties of the local water. The earliest bathing place was in or near the location now occupied by the town's casino. During the fifth century the little town fell victim to the violence that accompanied the period of intense migrations that followed the disappearance from the western empire of Roman governance.

== Population ==
Historical population
Year	Pop.	±% p.a.
1968	4,401	—
1975	4,455	+0.17%
1982	4,446	−0.03%
1990	4,372	−0.21%
1999	4,319	−0.14%
2007	4,421	+0.29%
2012	4,327	−0.43%
2017	4,404	+0.35%
2023	4,347	−0.22%
Source: INSEE

== Economy and tourism ==
The commune incorporates two mineral water springs, one of them, first exploited more than two thousand years ago, known as the Roman Spring and the other known as the Celtic Spring: Celtic Spring branded water is widely available in the area. The waters' curative properties are recommended against rheumatism and degenerative illnesses. The spa tradition today supports a more general tourist industry in the little town, which even boasts its own casino.

The little town also contains an archaeological museum containing remnants of North Vosgean settlements.

The strategic importance, during the Second World War, of the Wissembourg Gap is reflected in the approximately 15,403 buried in the war cemetery. More than 95% of these were German soldiers, but other nations and civilians are also represented here.

A meeting place called the Albert Schweitzer Centre was set up in 1993 to foster contacts between French and German young people.

Other nearby attractions in the area include the ruined Wasenbourg and the look-out tower on the Grand Wintersberg, some four kilometers to the north.

== Notable residents ==
- Suzanne de Dietrich, the Protestant theologian, was born in Niederbronn-les-Bains in 1881 (when the entire area was part of Germany).
- Alphonse-Marie Eppinger, the Catholic founder of the Sisters of the Divine Redeemer, was born in Niederbronn-les-Bains in 1814.

== See also ==
- Communes of the Bas-Rhin department
