= Cimade =

French non-governmental organisation

The Cimade is a French NGO founded at the beginning of the World War II by French Protestant student groups, in particular the Christian activist and member of the French Resistance Madeleine Barot, to give assistance and support to people uprooted by war, in the first instance those who were evacuated from the French provinces of Alsace and Lorraine located on the border with Germany. Under German occupation, the Cimade continued its operations, working with refugees, many of whom were Jewish, who, having fled from Germany and other war affected European countries, were interned in Southern France. Later they were active in underground work that provided protection for Jews in France. Today, they continue their work with uprooted people, especially undocumented immigrants in France.

== History ==
=== Beginnings ===
In 1939, many French citizens from Alsace and Lorraine, mainly Protestants, were evacuated away from the border with Germany to Southwestern France. In October 1939 several Protestant youth movements set up the Comité inter-mouvements auprès des évacués (Cimade), whose main function was to set up teams that would live among and assist the displaced in the camps.

=== Wartime ===
After the German invasion in 1940, the focus changed to working with the many refugees from the rest of Europe who were interned by the French government in camps in Southern France. Pressure by Cimade officials on the government resulted in permission for the team members to live as well as work in the camps.

In 1942 deportations of Jews to Germany (and beyond) greatly accelerated and Cimade teams in many cases went underground, working closely with local Protestant parishes to hide Jews and finally to smuggle them toward Spain and particularly Switzerland where the Cimade worked closely with the developing ecumenical movement which became the World Council of Churches in 1948.

=== Liberation ===
After the war, Cimade teams were deeply involved in working with displaced populations in France. Temporary housing units were donated by the Swiss churches and many volunteers from other countries joined the teams as “fraternal workers” to work on reconstruction and resettlement efforts. Later Cimade teams were involved in reconciliation projects with Germans, notably in Berlin, Bonn, Mainz, and Ludwigshafen.

== Present activities ==
Having developed a vocation of working with displaced populations, the Cimade was prepared for the waves of uprooted people who came from Eastern Europe, and North Africa in the first instance, later from Latin America, the Caribbean and Southeast Asia. Today, the flow continues with the new immigrants arriving from Africa and the Middle East. They are the lead agency recognized by French law working with undocumented immigrants (however their unique role has been challenged by the current French Immigration and National Identity minister, Éric Besson, with the result that a number of other organisations have now been authorised to offer services to illegal immigrants held in the expanded network of detention centres). The Cimade have been active advocates by participating in the legal defence of foreigners and migrant workers, and combatting discrimination and racism.

While the major focus of Cimade's work has been within Metropolitan France, teams were also active in foreign countries i.e. in Algeria (both during and after the Algerian war for independence), Senegal, and Rwanda (after the genocide).

== Ethos ==
Perhaps the most distinctive characteristic of Cimade's work is the commitment to show active solidarity with refugees, migrants, and oppressed people by being “present” (fr. présence) with them, that is by living among the communities and sharing their daily lives as well as providing assistance. This was a distinctive practice already in the internment camps of the Second World War. Such a présence has led directly to an emphasis on enabling those affected by displacement rather than just delivering assistance to them.

While the Cimade was founded by religious movements and works closely with church organizations, it is essentially a secular organization that respects the beliefs of the people with whom it works and does not engage in proselytism. The organization has tended to define itself by the actions of its teams (which have been composed of people of varying beliefs) rather than their motivations or theologies.

== Bibliography ==
- Jacques, André, “Cimade” in Dictionary of the Ecumenical Movement. Nicholas Lossky, José Miguez Bonino, John S. Pobee, Tom F. Stransky, Geoffrey Wainwright, Pauline Web, Editors. Geneva, WCC Publications. 1991, p. 188.
- Jacques, André, Trésors d’humanité, Paris, Les Éditions du Cerf. 2004
