= World Student Christian Federation =

International Ecumenical Youth Federation

- Abbreviation: WSCF
- Formation: 1895
- Purpose: youth-led Christian ecumenism
- Region served: 94 countries
- Website: www.wscf.ch

The World Student Christian Federation (WSCF) is a federation of autonomous national Christian student organizations forming the youth and student arm of the global ecumenical movement.

In 2025, it has 117 affiliated student groups in 94 countries and 2 million members. Its headquarters are located in Geneva, Switzerland.

== History ==
The Federation was founded in 1895 at a meeting of Christian student leaders from ten North American and European countries at Vadstena Castle in Sweden. American missionary leader of The Student Volunteer Movement for Foreign Missions and the Young Men's Christian Association, John R. Mott, would serve as WSCF General Secretary from 1895-1920, before becoming chairperson of the WSCF from 1920-1928. Mott travelled widely, helping establish Student Christian Movements around the world to develop young leaders for the emerging national churches that were beginning to seek independence from foreign mission sending agencies. Many of these young leaders also took prominent roles in national independence struggles against colonialism.

In 1910, the Cambridge Inter-Collegiate Christian Union (CICCU) split from the Student Christian Movement of Great Britain, due to disagreement with the SCM's move towards ecumenism and endorsement of new methods of biblical exegesis. In 1928, CICCU influenced the founding of the Inter-Varsity Fellowship.

The WSCF newsletter Federation News started in 1921 and is published twice a year. The WSCF journal Student World was begun in 1908 but has had a broken history of publication.

In 1968, the Federation formed six regional committees which became largely autonomous in 1972: Africa, Asia-Pacific, Europe, Latin America and the Caribbean, Middle East, and North America.

The global WSCF historical archives are held at Yale Divinity School Library, along with the archives of the Trustees of the World Student Christian Federation, Inc., and related US Student Christian Movements (SCMs), along with the personal papers of many WSCF and SCM leaders, including John R. Mott, Ruth Harris, Margaret Flory, Bruce Rigdon, and Alice Hageman.

== Beliefs ==
It holds Progressive Christian beliefs and studies various social justice issues, including trade justice, gender equality, globalization, racism, violence, war, HIV/AIDS, poverty, human rights, and ecology.

Some national member organizations, such as the Student Christian Movement of Canada, Student Christian Movement of Great Britain, Student Christian Movement of the Philippines, and Australian Student Christian Movement support the inclusion of LGBTQ people.

== Structure and activities ==
=== WSCF globally ===
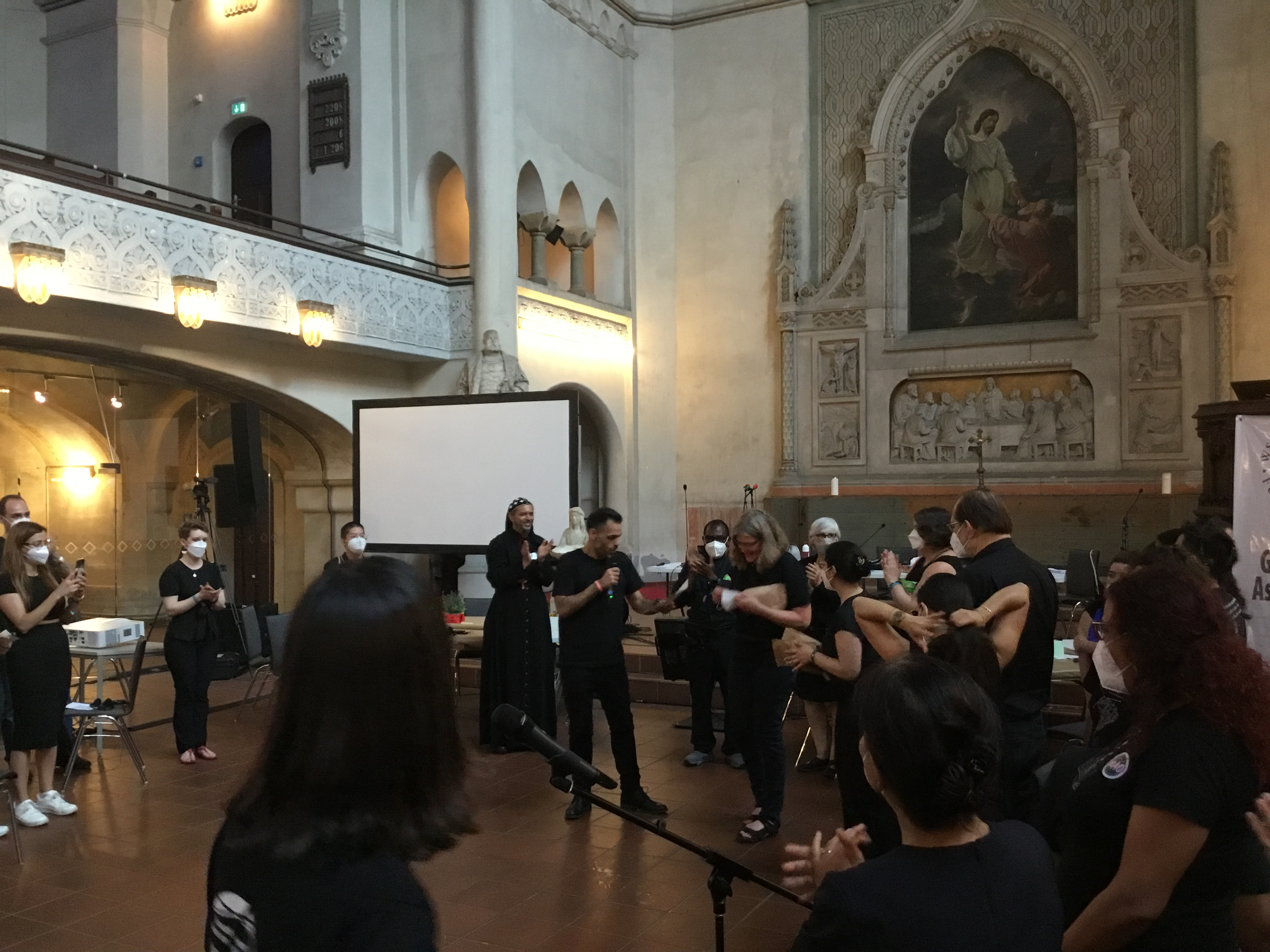
World Student Christian Federation 37th General Assembly held at Zwinglikirche, Berlin, Germany.

The General Assembly (GA) is the highest decision making body of the Federation. WSCF's GA is held approximately every four years.

The GA is made up of representatives from all affiliated and associated movements. The GA reviews the previous four years, plans for the next four years and elects the Executive Committee, Chairperson, Vice-Chairpersons, Treasurer and General Secretary.

The Executive Committee and staff (General Secretary and Regional Secretaries) co-ordinate the Federation's activities between General Assemblies. The Executive Committee has met in Zambia, Indonesia and Sicily.

The General Secretary is based in the Inter-Regional Office (IRO) in Geneva, Switzerland. The IRO is in the Ecumenical Centre which also houses the World Council of Churches, the World Alliance of Reformed Churches, the Lutheran World Federation, the Ecumenical Advocacy Alliance, the Conference of European Churches, Ecumenical News International, Action by Churches Together International, and many other organisations.

The IRO organises the General Assembly and Executive Committee, the IRO staff is the secretariat for WSCF's endowment The Centennial Fund. The IRO administers WSCF's income, salaries and fundraising and co-ordinates global WSCF programmes, the IRO administers the Ecumenical Assistance Programme, the Universal Day of Prayer for Students, produces Federation News and Student World maintains contact with national movements and Senior Friends and organises WSCF representation at meetings of the United Nations, UNESCO, World Council of Churches and other organisations.

=== General Secretaries of WSCF ===
- John R. Mott (USA) 1895-1920
- Team: Suzanne Bidgrain, Henry-Louis Henriod, C.D. Hurrey, Ruth Rouse, Margaret Wrong 1920-1924
- Henry-Louis Henriod 1924-1928
- Team: S.K. Datta, Henry-Louis Henriod, Conrad Hoffman, P.C.Hsu (Xu Baoqian), Walter Kotschnig, W.A. Visser 't Hooft 1928-1932
- Willem Visser t' Hooft (Netherlands) 1932-1938
- Robert C. Mackie (Scotland) 1938-1948
- Philippe Maury 1949-1961
- Valdo Galland 1961-1968
- Risto Lehtonen (Finland) 1968–1972
- Feliciano Cariño (Philippines)1973-1977
- Emidio Campi (Italy)1977-1984
- Manuel Quintero 1984-1986
- Christine Ledger (Australia) and Manuel Quintero (Cuba)1986-1990
- Clarissa Balan (Philippines) and Jean-Claude Deteil (France) 1990-1995
- Clarissa Balan (Philippines) and & Kwanga Mabuluki (Zambia)1995-2000
- Beate Fagerli (Norway) and Lawrence Nana Brew (Ghana)2000-2004
- Michael Wallace (Aotearoa New Zealand) 2004-2010
- Christine Housel (USA) 2011-2015
- Necta Rocas Montes (Philippines) 2015-2020
- Marcelo Leites (Uruguay) 2020-today

=== Chairpersons of the WSCF ===
- 1895-1920 Karl Fries
- 1920-1928 John R. Mott
- 1928-1938 Francis P. Miller
- 1938-1948 W. A. Visser 't Hooft
- 1949-1953 Robert Mackie
- 1953-1960 D.T. (Daniel) Niles
- 1960-1968 Philip Potter
- 1968-1972 Richard Shaull
- 1973-1978 Mercy Oduyoye
- 1978-1981 Berkeley Yebio
- 1982-1986 Juan Antonio Franco
- 1986-1990 Paulose Mar Paulose
- 1991-1995 Marshall Fernando
- 1995-1997 Deborah Spini
- 1997-1999 Wong Wai Ching
- 1999-2004 Ejike Okoro
- 2004-2008 Kenneth J. Guest
- 2008-2015 Horatio Mesones
- 2016-2020 Georgine Kegne Djeutane
- 2021-2025 Geevarghese Mor Coorilos

=== WSCF Regions ===
Until the 1960s, the WSCF was centralized in Geneva. This shifted in 1972, when the Federation divided into six regional offices with Geneva remaining as an inter-regional office. Each region has a regional secretary, officers and a committee made up of representatives from the national movements in the region. Each region has its own programmes and publications. The regions nominate students to participate in global WSCF programmes and other activities. Each region has two representatives on WSCF's global Executive Committee. The six regions are Africa, Asia-Pacific, Europe, Latin America and Caribbean, Middle East, and North America. The regional offices are in Nairobi, Hong Kong, Trento, Buenos Aires, Beirut and New York.

=== National Student Christian Movements ===
WSCF's ecumenical work operates at a national level through the Student Christian Movement (SCM). Each national SCM has ties to the ecumenical bodies such as the World Council of Churches, and other national ecumenical organizations such as the National Council of Churches in Australia and the Christian Conference of Asia.

National SCMs include the Student Christian Movement of Great Britain, Student Christian Movement of the Philippines, Student Christian Movement of Canada, and Indonesian Christian Student Movement.

== Related organisations ==
- World Council of Churches
- YMCA
- YWCA
- World University Service

== Notable members ==
- Raoul Allier
- Bishop George Bell
- Steve Biko
- Dietrich Bonhoeffer
- Bishop Charles Brent
- Charlotte Bunch 1944- US Feminist scholar/activist
- Inga-Brita Castrén (Finnish theologian, Secretary to Africa 1959-1962)
- Suzanne de Dietrich
- Charles Gruass
- Willem Visser 't Hooft (First General Secretary of the World Council of Churches)
- Bishop Penny Jamieson
- Samuel Kobia (Sixth General Secretary of the World Council of Churches)
- James Lawson (activist) 1928-2024 US Civil Rights organizer, Methodist Pastor
- Hannes Lilje
- Jürgen Moltmann
- Edouard Chivambo Mondlane (President of FRELIMO)
- John R. Mott (Nobel Peace Prize 1946)
- Pierre Maury
- Bishop Lesslie Newbigin
- Martin Niemöller
- Kwame Nkrumah
- Mwalimu Julius Nyerere
- Mercy Oduyoye (African theologian)
- Joseph Oldham
- Philip Potter (Third General Secretary of the World Council of Churches)
- Radius Prawiro (Minister of Finance of Indonesia)
- Micheline Ravololonarisoa (Malgasy activist)
- Frère Roger of the Taizé community
- Ruth Rouse
- Nancy Ruth Canadian Senator
- Archbishop Ted Scott
- Ellen Johnson Sirleaf President of Liberia
- Amir Sjarifuddin (Former Prime Minister of Indonesia)
- Archbishop Nathan Söderblom (Nobel Peace Prize 1930)
- William Stringfellow US Civil Rights Attorney, theologian 1928-1985
- Oliver Tambo
- William Temple
- Reinhold von Thadden
- M. M. Thomas (Indian theologian)
- Bishop K. H. Ting (Chinese Bishop)
- Archbishop Anders Wejryd
- Lois Miriam Wilson (Canadian Senator)
