= Nerses Pozapalian =

Senior bishop of the Armenian Apostolic Church

Archbishop Nerses Pozapalian
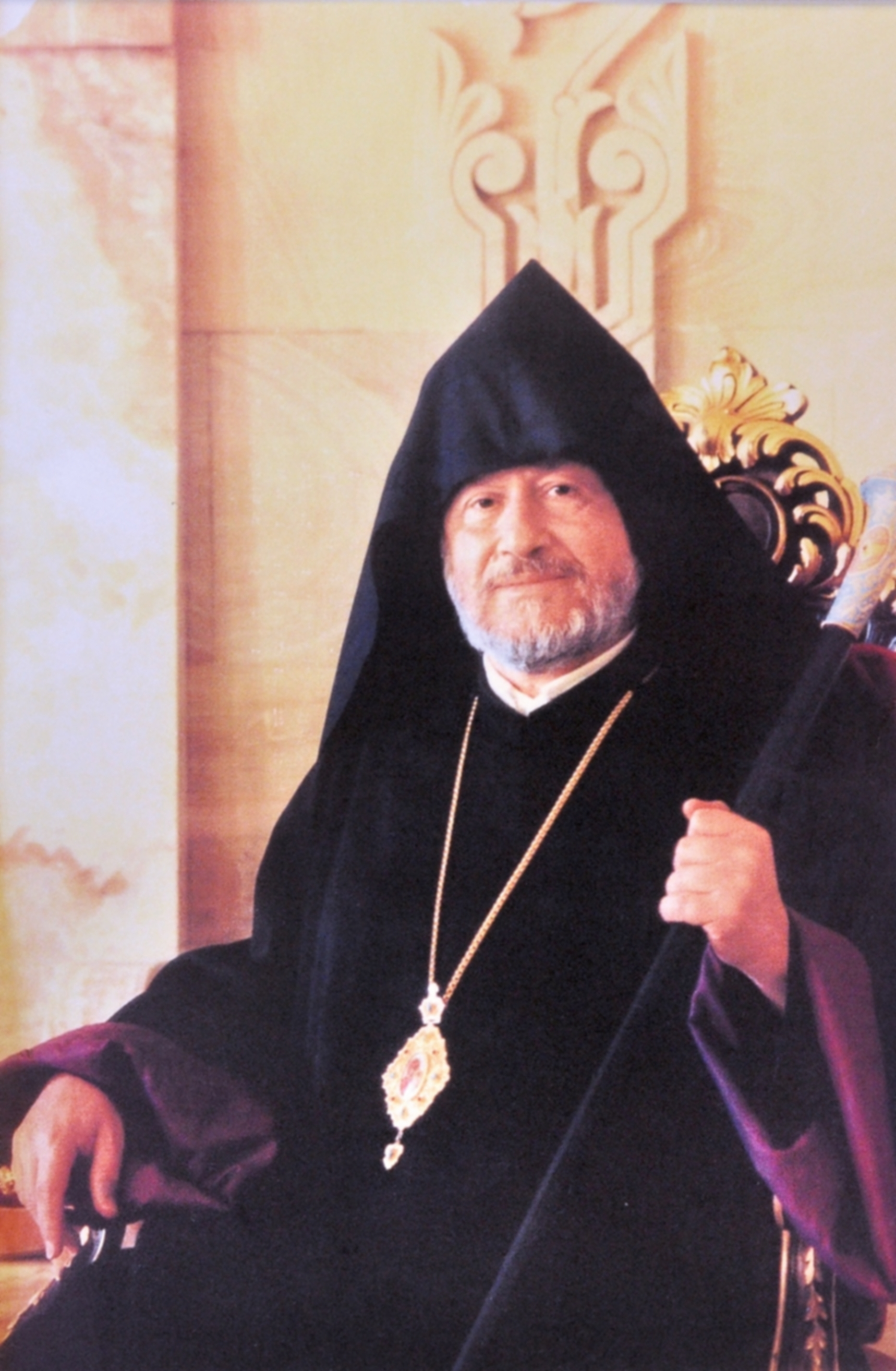
- Archbishop Nerses Pozapalian
- Native name: Տեր Ներսես արքեպիսկոպոս
- Church: Armenian Apostolic Church
- See: Mother See of Holy Etchmiadzin

Orders
- Rank: Archbishop

Personal details
- Born: Hakob Pozapalian; 21 August 1937 Kırıkhan, Turkey
- Died: June 27 2009 Vagharshapat, Armenia
- Denomination: Armenian Apostolic
- Education: Armenian Seminary of Antelias, Ecumenical Institute of Bossey

Archbishop Nerses (Armenian: Տեր Ներսես արքեպիսկոպոս) (born Hakob Pozapalian) (5 July 1937 – 27 June 2009) was a senior bishop of the Armenian Apostolic Church.

== Early life and education ==
Pozapalian was born in 1937 in the town of Kırıkhan, French Syria (now in Turkey) to parents Grigor and Makrouhy Pozapalian.

In 1939, he and his family migrated to Beirut; he was educated at the Noubarian Armenian College, the Armenian Seminary of Antelias, and the Central High College of Beirut. In 1957, his family repatriated to Soviet Armenia, and he continued his studies there at the Gevorkian Theological Seminary of the Mother See of Holy Etchmiadzin.

== Life in the Church ==
Pozapalian was ordained to the diaconate in 1957 by Archbishop Haikazoon Abrahamian. He continued his education at the Academy of the Russian Orthodox Church in Zagorsk. He was ordained as a celibate priest in 1961 by the Catholicos of All Armenians Vazken I and given the priestly name of Nerses.

In 1962, upon the successful defense of his thesis, Nerses received the rank of Archimandrite (Vardapet) and, in 1965 he received the rank of Senior Archimandrite (Dzayraguyn Vardapet).

From 1963 to 1965, Nerses studied at the Department of Theology at the College of the Resurrection in Yorkshire, England. At the same time, he participated in summer courses in English culture and literature at Cambridge University. Upon his return from England, he served as the dean of the Gevorkian Theological Seminary until 1969.

From 1969 to 1970, Nerses studied at the Ecumenical Institute of Bossey in Geneva. He served as the pastor for the Swiss-Armenian community from 1969 to 1972.

He served as the Primate of the Diocese of England from 1973 to 1982, and, in 1974, he was consecrated as a bishop by Catholicos Vasken I. In 1977, Pozapalian was awarded a special Letter of Gratitude by the English Queen Elizabeth II.

At the request of Vasken I, he returned to the Mother See of Holy Etchmiadzin in 1982 and was appointed to serve as the Chancellor of the Catholicosate of All Armenians. He established the Bible Society of Armenia in 1982.

In 1986, Pozapalian became an Archbishop. On July 4, 1999, he was elected to serve as Locum Tenens of the Mother See of Holy Etchmiadzin; he then organized the Catholicosal elections to take place later that year on October 27.

In 1999, he was elected a full member of the Humanitarian Academy of Russia.

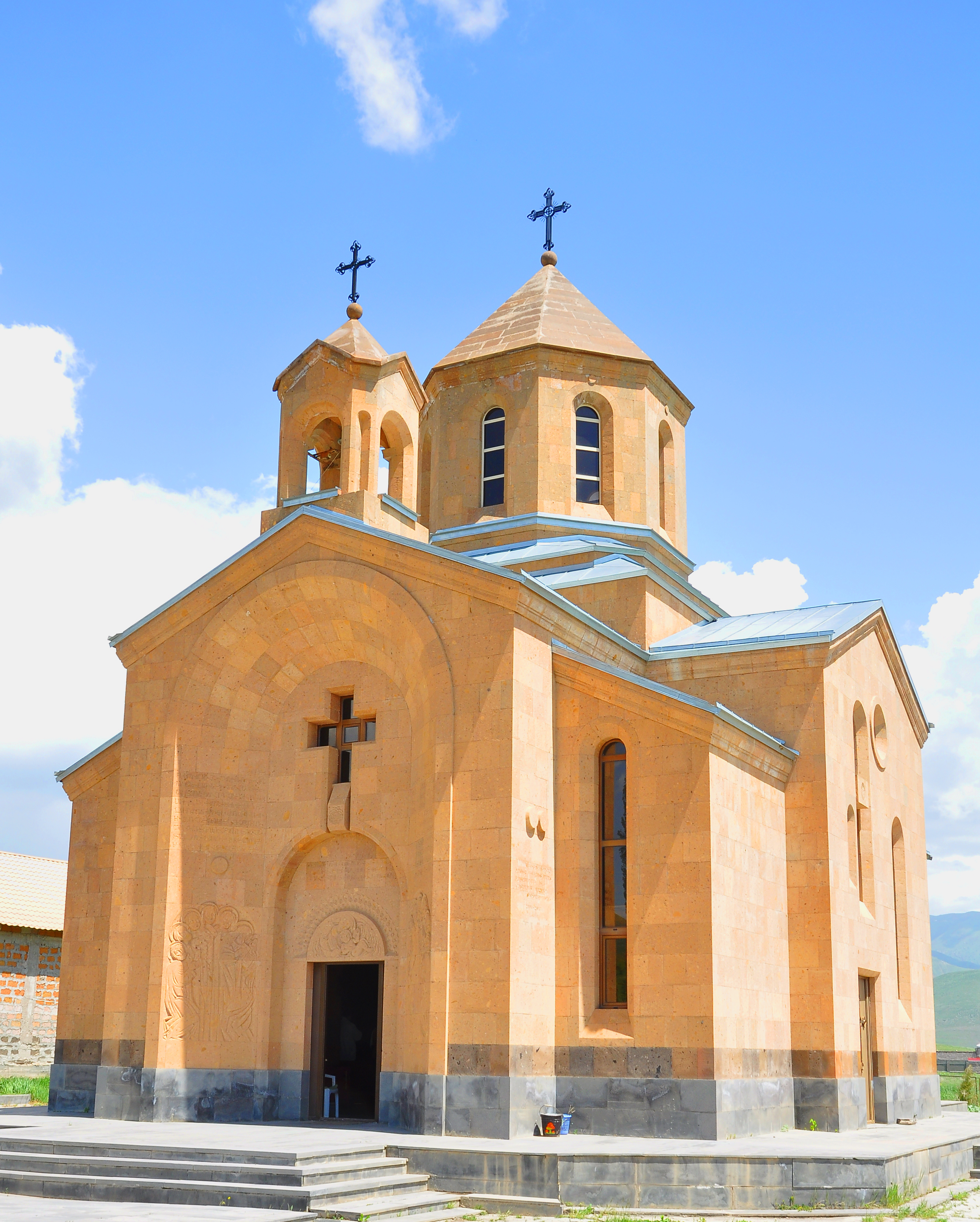
Holy Martyrs Church

In 2000, on the 40th anniversary of his ordination to the priesthood, Pozapalian sponsored the construction of the Holy Martyrs Church in the village of Teghenik, in memory of his parents. The church was consecrated in 2003. On this occasion he was awarded the order of St. Gregory the Illuminator by the Catholicos of All Armenians Karekin II.

Archbishop Pozapalian served as the Director of the Publishing Department of the Mother See of Holy Etchmiadzin until 2007 and was retired at the Mother See.

He published 10 books of poetry and sermons during his life.

He served as a lecturer at the Gevorkian Theological Seminary of Etchmiadzin, delivering lectures in Ecumenism, National Constitution, and the "Polozhenie". He also served on the Central Committee of the World Council of Churches, the Jinishian Benevolent Foundation, and was a member of the Executive Committee of the Bible Society of the Middle East.

=== Death ===
Archbishop Nerses was seriously injured in a robbery attack in his home at the Mother See on February 18, 2009, and was hospitalized in a coma. He died four months later on June 27.
