= Georges Küss =

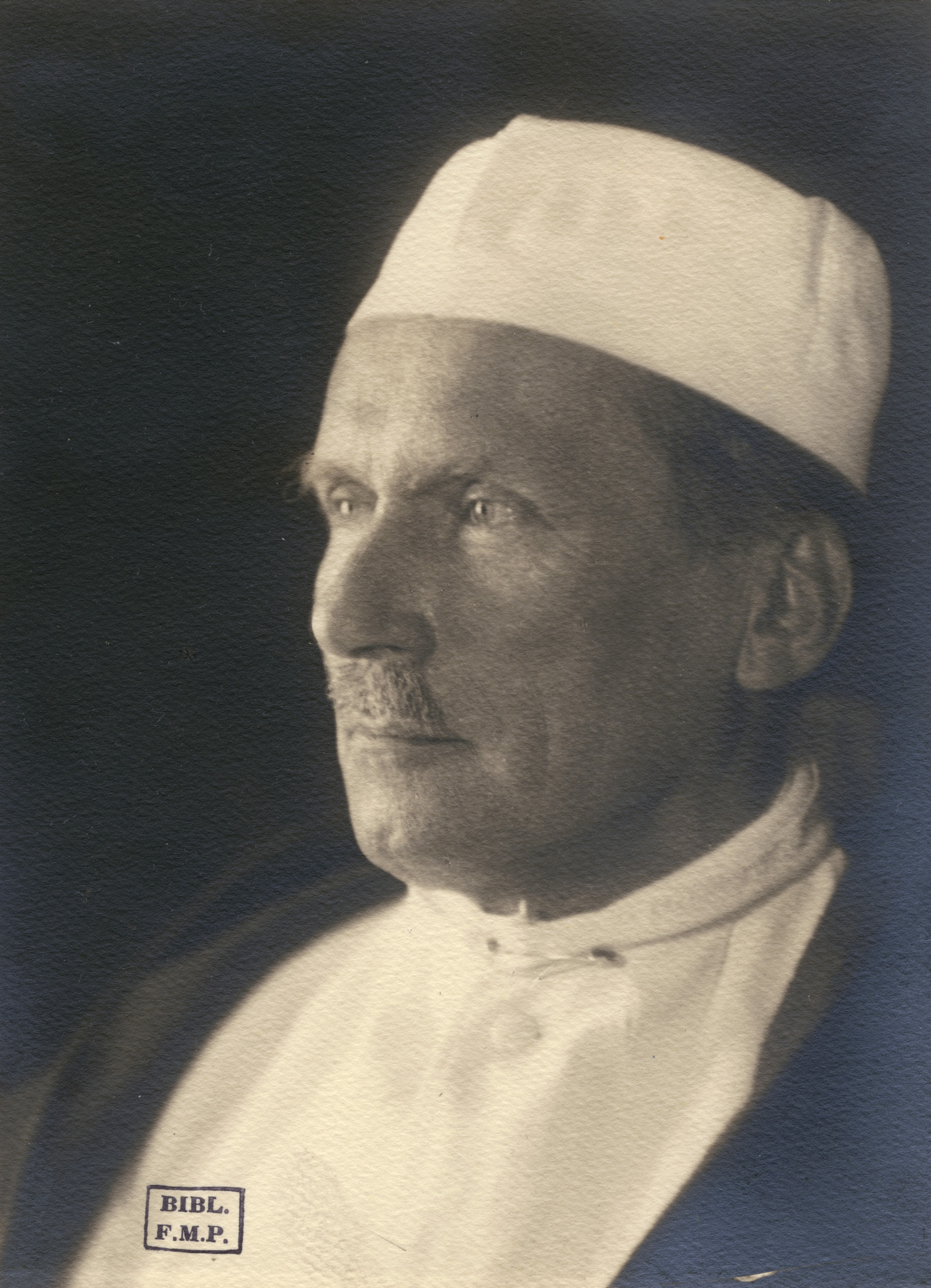

Georges Küss (1877-1967) was the president of the Académie nationale de chirurgie in 1949.

He was a student of Victor-Henri Huntinel.

At the turn of the 19th century, paediatrician Jules Parrot performed the groundwork on tuberculosis in children, a condition with a particular high mortality compared to adults with TB. After Robert Koch discovered the cause of Tuberculosis, the question arose as to why certain types of people get TB and could it be inherited. Küss was amongst a number of physicians who confirmed Parrot's discoveries that the primary infection taking place in a lung focus, usually subpleural is followed by the enlargement of the mediastinal lymph nodes. In 1898, he published De l’hérédité parasitaire de la tuberculose humaine, examining whether Tuberculosis was congenital or acquired by infectious spread. He showed that the focus of Tuberculosis in the lung, usually subpleural, was directly associated with the lymph nodes draining the relevant area, the tracheobronchial nodes, thereby proving infectious spread by air and disproving uterine inheritance of TB.

== Honors and awards ==
- Commander of the Order of Legion of Honour
