= Willem Visser 't Hooft =

Dutch theologian (1900–1985)

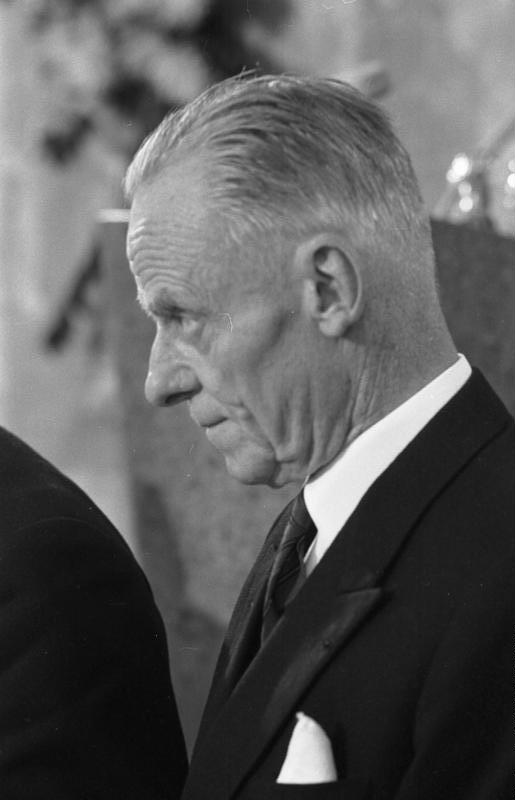
- Born: Willem Adolph Visser 't Hooft; 20 September 1900; Haarlem, Netherlands
- Died: 4 July 1985 (aged 84); Geneva, Switzerland
- Spouse: Henrietta Visser 't Hooft

Philosophical work
- Main interests: Theologian

Willem Adolph Visser 't Hooft (20 September 1900 – 4 July 1985) was a Dutch theologian who became the first secretary general of the World Council of Churches in 1948 and held this position until his retirement in 1966.

== Biography ==
Visser 't Hooft was born in Haarlem, in the Netherlands, and in his early adult years was involved in the Dutch student Christian movement that soon became involved internationally. In 1925, while on his first trip to the United States with John R. Mott, he became interested in the "social gospel" movement.

He wrote his doctoral dissertation on it at the University of Leiden in 1928. From October 1929 (vol. 22, no. 4) through the third quarter, 1939 (vol. 32, no. 3), he served as editor of The Student World, a quarterly magazine published in Geneva by the World Student Christian Federation. The magazine's motto was Ut Omnes Unum Sint (That they all may be one). From 1932 to 1938 he served as General Secretary of WSCF.

In 1938, Visser 't Hooft was named the first secretary general of the WCC, though he was only 38 at the time.

Visser 't Hooft was active in the resistance against Nazism. His apartment in Geneva, Switzerland became the meeting place for members of the German Resistance against the Third Reich between March and April 1944. Hilda Monte and Hannah Bertholet were among the 15-16 people from countries all over Europe who met to discuss international resistance to Nazism.

In 1946, he founded the Bossey Ecumenical Institute.

He wrote 15 books in several different languages and numerous articles and some 50,000 letters.

== Recognition ==
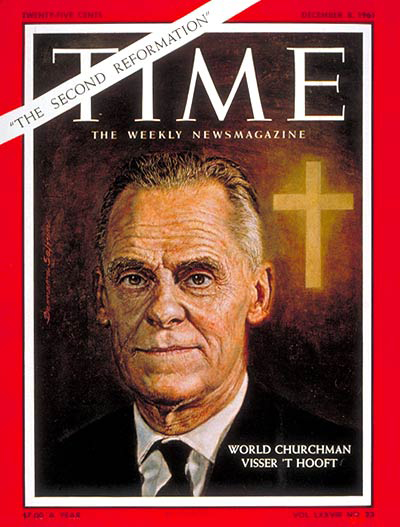
Visser 't Hooft on the cover of Time (December 8, 1961)

In 1961, Time magazine did a cover story on Visser 't Hooft and the World Council of Churches.

In 1967, een christelijke HBS met 5-jarigen cursus school in Leiden was renamed and called after Visser 't Hooft, the (Christelijk Lyceum Dr. W.A. Visser 't Hooft).

== Decorations and awards ==
- 1958 - Grand Cross of Merit with Star and Sash of the Federal Republic of Germany
- 1959 - Officer of the Legion of Honour
- 1966 - Peace Prize of the German Book Trade (with Augustin Bea)
- 1967 - Honorary Citizen of the City of Geneva
- 1968 - Honorary Chairman of the World Council of Churches
- 1975 - Augustin Bea Prize
- 1982 - Four Freedoms Award (category of Religious Freedom)
- 15 honorary degrees, including those of the theological faculties of Princeton, Oxford, Yale and Harvard.

== Selected literary works ==
- The Background of the Social Gospel in America, Haarlem: H.D. Tjeenk Willink & Zoon, 1928.
- Anglo-Catholicism and Orthodoxy: A Protestant View, London: SCM Press, 1933.
- Students Find the Truth to Serve: The Story of the World's Student Christian Federation 1931-1935, Geneva: World's Student Christian Federation, [1935].
- Visser 't Hooft, W.A. and J. H. Oldham, The Church and Its Function in Society, New York: Willett, Clark & Company, 1937.
- The Kingship of Christ: An Interpretation of Recent European Theology, New York: Harper, 1948.
- The Renewal of the Church, Philadelphia: Westminster Press, 1956.
- Rembrandt and the Gospel, Philadelphia: Westminster Press, 1958.
- The Pressure of Our Common Calling, New York: Doubleday, 1959.
- No Other Name: The Choice between Syncretism and Christian Universalism, London: SCM, 1963.
- Bea, Augustin and Willem A. Visser 't Hooft, Peace Among Christians, translated by Judith Moses, New York: Association Press; Herder and Herder, 1967.
- Memoirs, Philadelphia: Westminster Press, 1973.
- The Genesis and Formation of the World Council of Churches, Geneva: World Council of Churches, 1982.
- The Fatherhood of God in an Age of Emancipation, Geneva: World Council of Churches, 1982.
- Teachers and the Teaching Authorities, Geneva: WCC Publications, 1990.
- "The Inclusive and Exclusive Aspects of Christian Truth," The Student World, vol. 22, no. 4 (October, 1929): 349-355.
- "The Economy of the Charismata and the Ecumenical Movement," in Student Christian Association of Greece, Paulus-Hellas-Oikumene (An Ecumenical Symposium), Athens: Student Christian Association of Greece (1951): 189-192.
- "The Integrity of the Church," Princeton Seminary Bulletin, vol. 52, no. 2 (1958): 3-7.
- "Missions as a Test of Faith," Ecumenical Review, vol. 16, no. 3 (April, 1964): 249-257.

== See also ==
- Lukas Vischer (theologian)
