= Carl Oglesby =

American academic (1935–2011)

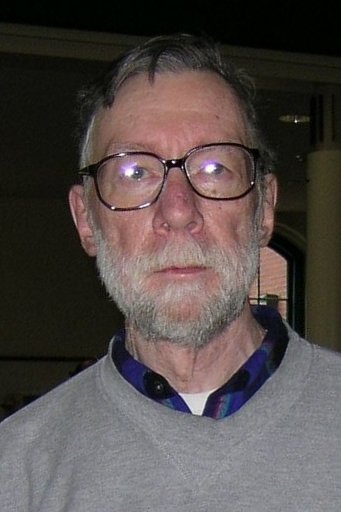
- Carl Oglesby in 2006
- Born: July 30, 1935; Akron, Ohio, U.S.
- Died: September 13, 2011 (aged 76); Montclair, New Jersey, U.S.
- Occupations: Technical writer, activist, college teacher, author
- Known for: "Let Us Shape the Future" speech in Washington, D.C.; The Yankee and Cowboy War
- Spouses: Beth Rimanoczy (m. 1956; div. 1969); Anne Mueller (divorced); Sally Waters (divorced)
- Children: 3: Aron, Caleb, Shay
- Parent(s): Carl Preston Oglesby Sr. Alma Romaldus Loving

Carl Preston Oglesby Jr. (July 30, 1935 – September 13, 2011) was an American political activist, author, academic, singer-songwriter, and playwright. From 1965 to 1966, he served as president of the leftist student organization Students for a Democratic Society (SDS).

After leaving SDS, Oglesby researched and wrote about post-World War II American history, in particular the assassination of John F. Kennedy, and was credited with helping to bring about the U.S. House Select Committee on Assassinations in 1976. He is also credited with coining the term "Global South", which he first used in a 1969 article.

== Early life ==
Carl Oglesby's father was from South Carolina, and his mother from Alabama. They both migrated north for job opportunities. They met in 1934 in Akron, Ohio, where Carl's father had found work, first at a Firestone tire plant and then later at Goodyear.

Carl graduated from Revere High School in suburban Akron, winning a prize in his final year for a speech in favor of America's Cold War stance. He enrolled at Kent State University. While there, he met and married Beth Rimanoczy, a graduate student in the English department. They would eventually have three children (Aron, Caleb, and Shay). After three years at Kent State, Oglesby dropped out and moved to the Bohemian neighborhood of Greenwich Village to pursue a New York stage career as an actor and playwright. Following an unsuccessful year in New York, he returned to Akron to become a copy editor for Goodyear. He meanwhile continued his creative endeavors. Influenced by Britain's "angry young men" literary movement, he wrote three plays, including "a well-received work on the Hatfield-McCoy feud", as well as an unfinished novel.

In 1958, Oglesby and his young family moved to Ann Arbor, Michigan after he obtained a technical writing position at Bendix Corporation, a defense contractor. He ascended to the directorship of the company's technical writing division while also completing his undergraduate degree as a part-time student at the University of Michigan (where he cultivated friends such as Donald Hall and Frithjof Bergmann) in 1962. In that same year, his play The Peacemaker was produced in Ann Arbor and Boston. In his 2008 autobiography Ravens in the Storm, Oglesby chronicles a fateful day in late 1963 when he was working at his desk at Bendix Corporation, and a co-worker told him the news from Dallas that President Kennedy had been shot. The JFK assassination would later occupy more than two decades of Oglesby's life.

== Involvement with SDS ==
Oglesby first came into contact with SDS in Ann Arbor in 1964. He had recently written an article, printed in the University of Michigan campus magazine, which was critical of American foreign policy in the Far East. SDS members read the article, and went to meet Oglesby at his home to see if he might want to join their organization. As Oglesby put it:

We talked. I got to thinking about things. As a writer, I needed a mode of action.... I couldn't just grumble and go off to the creative spider-hole and turn out plays. From what SDS said about the Movement, it sounded like a direct way I could deal with things. I had to decide: was I going to be a writer just to be a professional writer, or was I going to write in order to make change? I saw that people were already moving, so I joined up.

He left Bendix in 1965 to become director of a newly formed SDS unit called "Research, Information, and Publications".

He was so impressed by the spirit and intellectual vigor of SDS that he was soon extremely active in the organization. One of his early projects was to form a "grass-roots theatre", but that effort was superseded by SDS opposition to the growing U.S. combat involvement in the Vietnam War. Despite the notable age gap between the 30-year-old Oglesby and the college-aged undergraduates who comprised most of the membership, he was elected national SDS president within a year. He helped organize a University of Michigan "teach-in", the first of its kind, in which faculty engaged in a work stoppage to protest the "moral, political, and military consequences" of the Vietnam War. On April 17, 1965, he and Beth attended the first SDS-sponsored March on Washington against the war, with approximately 25,000 demonstrators in attendance. He then initiated plans for a second SDS peace march to be held later in the year in Washington, D.C.

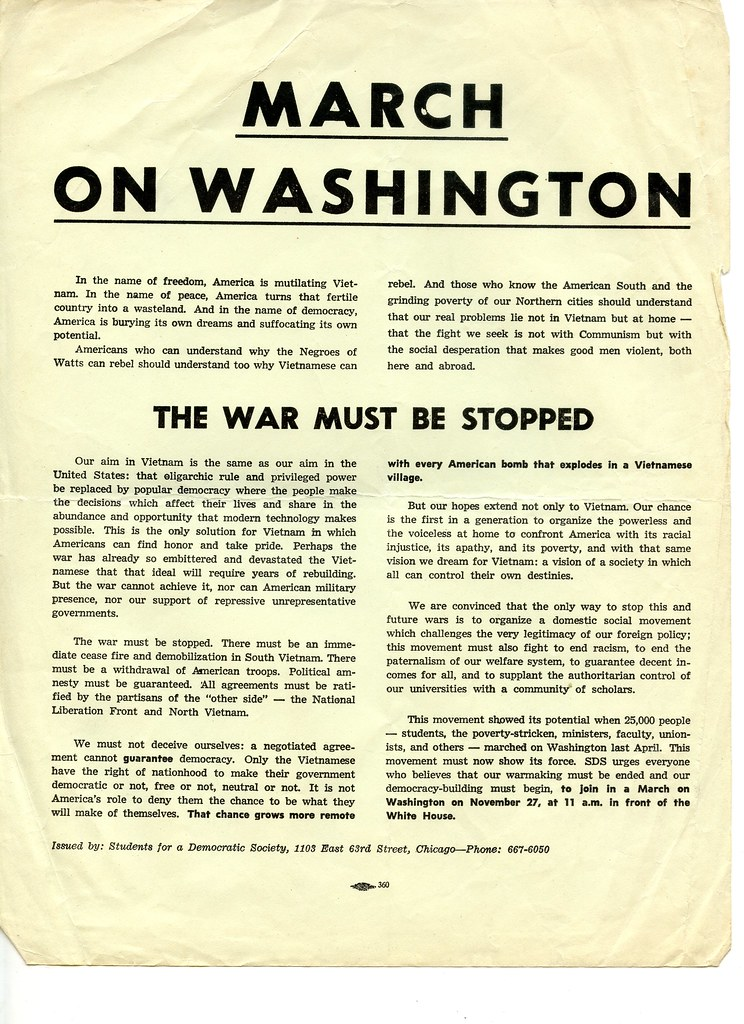
SDS flyer for the November 1965 March on Washington against the Vietnam War

On November 27, 1965. Oglesby delivered a speech entitled "Let Us Shape the Future" before another large audience of anti-war protesters in the nation's capital. It was the high point of his SDS presidency. He compared the Vietnam revolution to the American revolution. He said, "Our dead revolutionaries would soon wonder why their country was fighting against what appeared to be a revolution." He condemned what he called "corporate liberalism" and accused anti-Communists in the U.S. of self-righteously denouncing Communist tyranny, while ignoring the "right-wing tyrannies that our businessmen traffic with and our nation profits from every day." In a memorable passage, he challenged those who called him anti-American: "I say, don’t blame me for that! Blame those who mouthed my liberal values and broke my American heart." The speech became an important early articulation of the anti-war movement. According to Kirkpatrick Sale,

It was a devastating performance: skilled, moderate, learned, and compassionate, but uncompromising, angry, radical, and above all persuasive. It drew the only standing ovation of the afternoon... for years afterward it would continue to be one of the most popular items of SDS literature.

Oglesby's political outlook was more eclectic than that of many SDS members. He was heavily influenced by libertarian economist Murray Rothbard, and dismissed socialism as "a way to bury social problems under a federal bureaucracy." In 1967, he co-authored with Richard Shaull the book Containment and Change, which argued for an alliance between the New Left and the libertarian, non-interventionist Old Right in opposing an imperialist U.S. foreign policy. He once unsuccessfully proposed cooperation between SDS and the conservative group Young Americans for Freedom on some projects. His contributions to Containment and Change were later praised in The American Conservative magazine. One writer said that Oglesby "was on to something when he suggested that the Old Right and New Left have (some) common ground." Another wrote:

In his essay "Vietnamese Crucible," published in ... Containment and Change, Oglesby rejected the "socialist radical, the corporatist conservative, and the welfare-state liberal" and challenged the New Left to embrace "American democratic populism" and "the American libertarian right." Invoking Senator Taft, Gen. Douglas MacArthur, Congressman Buffett, and Saturday Evening Post writer Garet Garrett, among other stalwarts of the Old Right, he asked, "Why have the traditional opponents of big, militarized, central authoritarian government now joined forces with such a government’s boldest advocates?" What in the name of Thomas Jefferson were conservatives doing holding the bag for Robert Strange McNamara?

Steve Mariotti, a teenage SDS colleague of Oglesby's in 1965, credits Oglesby with inspiring what became known as the two-axis Nolan Chart. It occurred during a rehearsal of the "Let Us Shape the Future" speech when Oglesby "used the word 'coordinates' to describe issues on which he believed the Left and the Right shared common ground. This led us into a discussion of the limitations of the Left/Right line chart, which was often used at the time to illustrate a person's political views."

It isn't the rebels who cause the troubles of the world, it's the troubles that cause the rebels.
—Carl Oglesby

In 1968, Oglesby signed the "Writers and Editors War Tax Protest" pledge, vowing along with several hundred others that they "would not pay a proposed 10 percent income tax surcharge or any other [Vietnam] war-designated tax increase." Also in 1968, he was asked by Black Panther leader Eldridge Cleaver to serve as his running mate on the Peace and Freedom Party ticket in that year's presidential election (Oglesby declined the offer).

In 1969, he edited The New Left Reader, an anthology of speeches and writings by radical thinkers such as Frantz Fanon, Herbert Marcuse and C. Wright Mills who had influenced the New Left movement, of which SDS was a part. Later in that year, Oglesby was forced out of SDS when the organization's left-wing members accused him of "being 'trapped in our early, bourgeois stage' and for not progressing into 'a Marxist–Leninist perspective.'"

== Post-SDS ==
After his departure from SDS, Oglesby became a musician, writer, and academic. His self-titled folk-rock album was released in 1969 by Vanguard Records. It was later reviewed unfavorably by Village Voice rock critic Robert Christgau who wrote: "In which the first president of SDS takes after Leonard Cohen, offering a clue as to why the framers of the Port Huron Statement didn't change the world in quite the way they envisioned. Overwritten, undermusicked, not much fun, not much enlightenment—in short, the work of someone who needs a weatherman (small 'w' please) to know which way the wind blows." Oglesby released one more album, "Going to Damascus", in 1971.

In 1970, he was a featured speaker at the "Left/Right Festival of Liberation" organized by the California Libertarian Alliance. This attempt at bridge-building was characteristic of Oglesby, who had written in 1967: "In a strong sense, the Old Right and the New Left are morally and politically coordinate."

To earn his livelihood, Oglesby turned to college teaching. He taught political science at Dartmouth College and at the Massachusetts Institute of Technology.

== JFK assassination ==
In the Introduction to his 1992 book The JFK Assassination: The Facts and the Theories, Oglesby noted that "once I wandered into the [JFK assassination] case in 1973, I have never found my way back out." By 1973, he was living in Cambridge, Massachusetts and had helped found the Assassination Information Bureau (AIB), which he also co-directed. The AIB would be credited with applying pressure on the U.S. Congress to re-investigate the JFK and Martin Luther King Jr. assassinations. Eventually, the buildup of popular demand resulted in the establishment of the United States House Select Committee on Assassinations in September 1976.

External audio
- "Cowboys and Yankees". A discussion of assassination in Boston, from 31 January – 2 February 1975. Broadcast on KPFK 2 April 1975. Pacifica Radio Archives.

=== The Yankee and Cowboy War ===
Oglesby wrote several books on the assassination of John F. Kennedy and the various competing theories that sought to explain it. In the first of these books, The Yankee and Cowboy War (1976), he proposed a new analytic framework for understanding recent U.S. history. He said the JFK assassination, Watergate scandal, and downfall of President Nixon represented "the violent eruptions of a deeper struggle of rival power elites identified here as Yankees and Cowboys." According to his argument, a post-World War II schism arose in the U.S. ruling class between (a) traditional Eastern conservative "Yankees" (bankers mostly)—exemplified by Nelson Rockefeller, Henry Cabot Lodge, John Kennedy, Clark Clifford, and Averell Harriman—and (b) hard-right Sun Belt "Cowboys" (oil and aerospace magnates)—exemplified by H. L. Hunt, Clint Murchison, Howard Hughes, Lyndon Johnson, Barry Goldwater, and Richard Nixon. Using this framework, JFK's murder was an assertion of power by the Cowboys who wanted rapid escalation of U.S. involvement in Vietnam. In characterizing the book, Kirkus Reviews depicted Oglesby as believing that JFK was killed by "a rightist conspiracy formed out of anti-Castro Cuban exiles, the Syndicate, and a Cowboy oligarchy, supported by renegade CIA and FBI agents."

=== Other writings ===
During the 1970s and '80s, Oglesby befriended New Orleans District Attorney Jim Garrison and contributed the Afterword, "Is the Mafia Theory a Valid Alternative?", to Garrison's 1988 book On the Trail of the Assassins. Oglesby wrote that he believed that the assassination was a politically motivated, CIA-orchestrated operation: "Its purpose was to stop J.F.K.'s movement toward détente in the Cold War, and it succeeded in doing that. It must therefore be regarded as a palace coup d'état. Oswald was an innocent man craftily set up to take the blame."

As a journalist, Oglesby covered the filming of Oliver Stone's JFK and commented on the extraordinary mainstream media scrutiny the film received while in production. He contributed the foreword to Dick Russell's 1992 book The Man Who Knew Too Much about Richard Case Nagell and was interviewed for the documentary Beyond 'JFK': The Question of Conspiracy, released the same year. Oglesby also published a book of his own in 1992, Who Killed JFK?, a short volume in which he summarized his twenty years of research into the events of November 22, 1963:

This book will prove to you that the official stories of what happened that day cannot possibly be true, that Kennedy was killed by a conspiracy and that the government of the United States has been—and still is—involved in covering up that conspiracy.

== Later years ==
In April 2006, Oglesby spoke at the Northeast Regional Conference of the "new SDS" where he said that activism is about "teaching yourself how to do what you don't know how to do."

On September 13, 2011, Carl Oglesby died of lung cancer at his home in Montclair, New Jersey. He was 76.

== In popular culture ==
Oglesby has been credited with coining the term "Global South", which he first used in a 1969 article.

In November 1988, he appeared on The Morton Downey Show to discuss JFK's legacy. In November 1991, Oglesby was a panelist on The Ron Reagan Show with other JFK assassination researchers including David Lifton, Robert J. Groden, and Robert Sam Anson.

In the 2020 feature film The Trial of the Chicago 7, Oglesby (who testified in the Chicago 7 trial as a defense witness) was portrayed by Michael A. Dean.

== Works ==
=== Books ===
- Containment and Change: Two Dissenting Views of American Foreign Policy, with Richard Shaull. Introduction by Leon Howell. New York: Macmillan. 1967. OCLC 5432663. Contains Oglesby's "Vietnamese Crucible: An Essay on the Meanings of the Cold War," pp. 3–176.
- The New Left Reader. New York: Grove Press. 1969. ISBN 978-8345615363. OCLC 44987. Edited by Oglesby, who also contributed an essay, "The Idea of the New Left".
- The Yankee and Cowboy War: Conspiracies from Dallas to Watergate. Kansas City: Sheed Andrews and McMeel. 1976. ISBN 0836206800.
- Who Killed JFK?. Real Story Series. Berkeley, California: Odonian Press. 1992. ISBN 978-1878825100. OCLC 25093879.
- The JFK Assassination: The Facts and the Theories. Signet. 1992. ISBN 0451174763.
- Ravens in the Storm: A Personal History of the 1960s Antiwar Movement. New York: Scribner. 2008. ISBN 1416547363.

=== Selected articles ===
- "The Secret Treaty of Fort Hunt." CovertAction Information Bulletin (Fall 1990).

=== Filmography ===
==== Television documentaries ====
- Beyond JFK: The Question of Conspiracy (1992). Directed by Barbara Kopple & Danny Schechter.
- Articulate '60s Activist Looks Back To See How He Failed Making Sense of the Sixties (January 21–23, 1991). PBS. Read excerpts.
- Rebels With a Cause (2000). Written and directed by Helen Garvey.

=== Interviews ===
==== Radio ====
External audio
- "Medical Evidence about the JFK Assassination." Interviewed and produced by Bob Young. California: KPFK (27 May 1992).

- Interviewed by Bob Fass (31 January 1975). WBAI Radio (New York). doi:10.7916/d8-q3mg-7326.

==== Audio ====
- Interviewed by Bret Eynon (1981). The New York Times oral history program. Contemporary History Project oral history collection, no. 35.
- "Student Movements of the 1960s: The Reminiscences of Carl Oglesby". (December 12, 1984). Interviewed by Bret Eynon. Columbia University Oral History Collection (Cambridge, Massachusetts). doi:10.7916/d8-ga9g-2y51. Full transcript / audio.
- "Former SDS Leader Insists That LaRouche 'Has Never Been a Marxist'". Interviewed by Herbert Quinde. Executive Intelligence Review, vol. 13, no. 20 (May 16, 1986), pp. 32–33. Full issue.
- "Carl Oglesby Interview" "Resistance and Revolution: The Anti-Vietnam War Movement at the University of Michigan, 1965–1972", Interviewed by Bret Eynon (July 1978).

==== Print ====
- Rosenblatt, Rand K. "Carl Oglesby (Silhouette)". Harvard Crimson (15 February 1966).
- Kauffman, Bill. "Writer on the Storm". Reason (April 2008). "Former New Left leader Carl Oglesby on the '60s, his old friend Hillary Rodham Clinton, and the dream of a left-libertarian alliance."

=== Discography ===
- Carl Oglesby [LP] (1969)
- Going to Damascus [LP] (1971)

=== Collected works ===
- Clandestine America: Selected Writings on Conspiracies from the Nazi Surrender to Dallas, Watergate, and Beyond. Cambridge, Mass.: Protean Press (2020). ISBN 978-0991352050.
