= Woodshop (film) =

- Film poster
- Directed by: Pete Coggan
- Written by: Pete Coggan
- Produced by: Pete Coggan
- Starring: Jesse Ventura; Scott Cooper Ryan; Jonathan Davis; Olivia Hendrick; Ross Marquand; Keegan Ridgley; Don S. Davis; Mitch Pileggi
- Edited by: Pete Coggan; Paul Lee
- Production company: 42 Productions
- Distributed by: Gravitas Ventures
- Release dates: February 15, 2009 (Boulder, Colorado)
- Running time: 90 minutes
- Country: United States
- Language: English

Woodshop is an independent American film written and directed by Peter Coggan that was released on DVD on September 7, 2010. Produced by Colorado-based 42 Productions, the film originally premiered at the University of Colorado ATLAS Institute in Boulder, Colorado on February 15, 2009.

While in pre-production of a project known as Coda, Pete Coggan came across technological and budgetary issues. Coggan wanted to originally film with a 35mm camera, but was advised to buy the then upcoming Red One camera. Calculating the risk in waiting for its release and experimenting with this new camera for his ambitious science fiction project, Coggan decided to temporarily shelve Coda and make use of the pre-production crew, actors and new technology he had set for it. Over the period of one of weekend, Coggan developed a script from ideas he wrote in high school woodshop class. This became Woodshop, 42 Productions' first self-produced feature film and one of the first to be shot in ultra-high definition with the Red One camera technology.

== Plot ==
Class valedictorian Chris Johnson is a high school senior who is only interested in one thing: maintaining his 4.0 GPA and moving on to an Ivy League school. But when he blows up a classroom in a chemistry class mishap, he receives a devastating "F" that threatens his ambitions. Chris strikes a deal with the school's principal and agrees to spend one Saturday of detention in the woodshop in exchange for wiping the grade from his record. What Chris didn't count on was having to survive the ex-Army Ranger who runs the woodshop, the eccentric students in class and one kid's plan to blow them all up.

== Cast ==
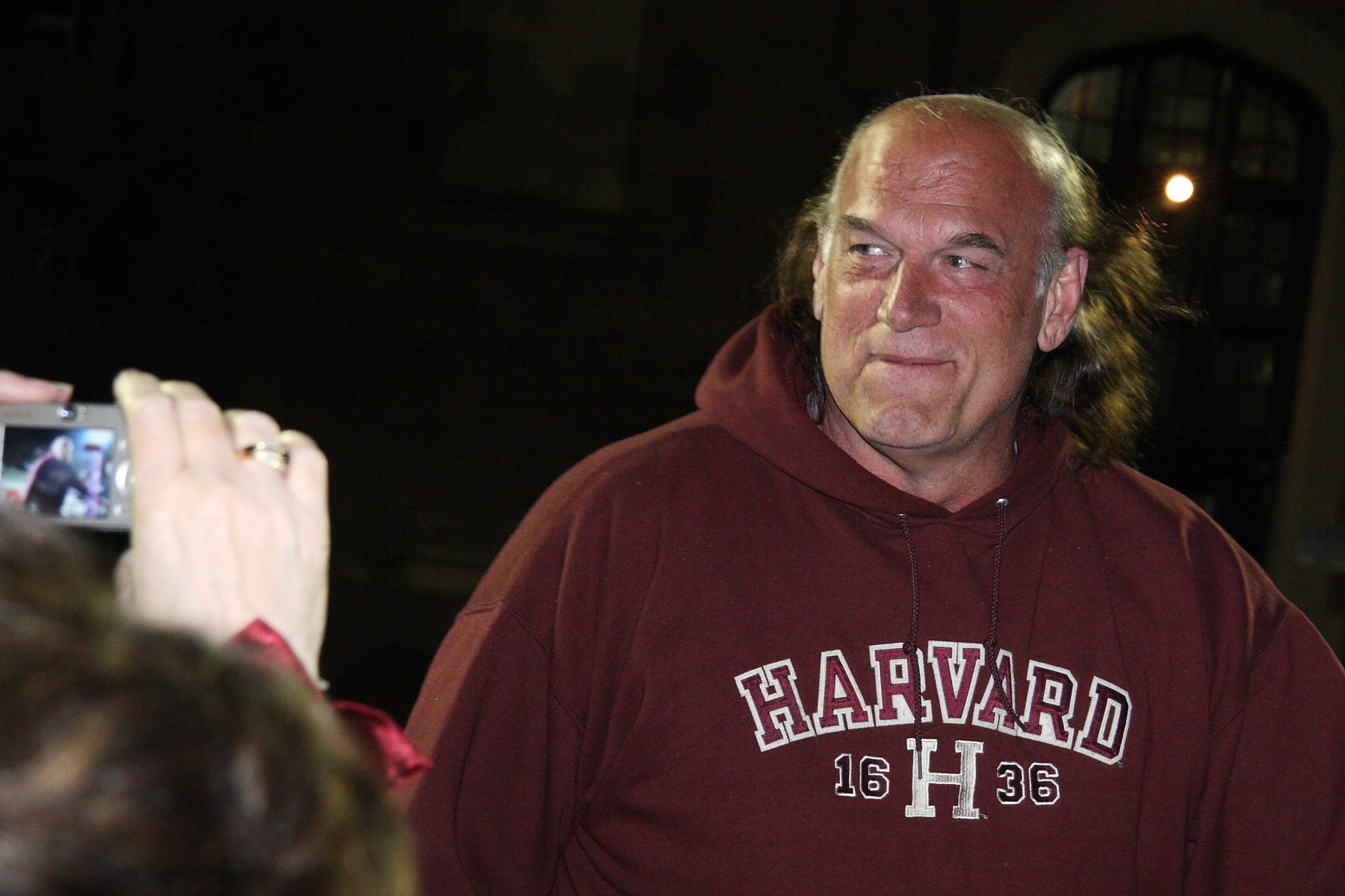
Ventura at the film's premiere

- Jesse Ventura as Mr. Madson
- Mitch Pileggi as Colonel Miller
- Don S. Davis as Principal Jamison
- Scott Cooper Ryan as Chris Johnson
- Jonathan Davis as Trey
- Olivia Hendrick as Wendy
- Ross Marquand as Gary
- Keegan Ridgley as Craig
- Rod Smith as Mr. Smith, FBI Agent
- Jeffry Sherman Nixon as Paul
- Isaac McGuinness Todd as Tony
- Mitch Todd as Brett
- Nick Holmes as Thad
- Drew Todd as Jim

Woodshop is the first film in which Ventura has acted in ten years, and first since he served as governor of Minnesota. The character of Frank Madson was created with Ventura specifically in mind. Originally, Madson was going to be played by Coggan himself, until Ventura agreed to star in the role, after the writer/director wrote a letter stating that he could not possibly see anyone else in the role of the ex-Army ranger. On his experience working with Coggan and his company, Ventura stated: "I've worked for some of the largest film companies in Hollywood, but I can tell you that working with Pete was one of the most fun and professional experiences that I've ever had."

== Soundtrack ==
Formerly a musician, Coggan along with his friend Sam McGuire wrote the score for the film, which features songs by 3OH!3 and Big Head Todd and the Monsters.

== Reception ==
In a negative review, CHUD.com's Ryan Mason wrote, "This movie doesn't look great. The lighting is student-film quality and it shows on screen — the whole thing is dingy to the point of almost feeling damp, if that’s even possible. Sadly, that’s not the worst of the presentation. I haven’t heard audio this bad in a movie in a long time. Unable to hear entire conversations, it’s clear that the mix is completely off — sounds of footsteps drown out dialogue, levels drop and rise during the same conversation, even with the volume turned way up the dialogue still sounded muffled."

In a mixed review, Home Media Magazine's John Matchem said, "While billed as a comedy, the film's uneasy tone never quite gives its audience a comfort zone for a hearty laugh" but praised the acting, writing, "On the plus side, Ventura exudes a commanding presence in his limited role." Bill Ward of the Star Tribune gave the film a positive review, calling it "a raunchier update of The Breakfast Club, with less of that 1985 hit's wit and pacing, but some poignant moments". He said that "like Ventura's character, it has a sweet core beneath the coarseness".
