= Richard Shaull =

American theologian and missionary (1919–2002)

Millard Richard Shaull (November 24, 1919 – October 25, 2002) was an American theologian, author and a Presbyterian missionary noted for his support for pedagogical thinking in Latin America.

== Biography ==
Shaull was born November 24, 1919, in Felton, Pennsylvania, to Millard and Anna (Brenneman) Shaull. He earned a B.A. from Elizabethtown College in 1938, and a Th.B. (1941) and Th.D. (1959) from Princeton Theological Seminary. He served as a missionary to Colombia and later taught ecumenics at Princeton Theological Seminary until he retired in 1980, in addition to serving with the World Student Christian Federation. Shaull was sympathetic to Latin-American progressives and was accused of advocating “blood revolution” by the Conservative The Southern Presbyterian Journal.

He died at age 82 on October 25, 2002, at home in Ardmore, Pennsylvania.

== Selected publications ==
=== Journals ===
- "Latin America: Three Responses to a New Historical Situation." Interpretation 46, 3 (July 1992): 261–270.
- "The Pentecost Appeal to the Poor." Church & Society 86, 4 (March–April 1996): 49–55.
- "From Academic Research to Spiritual Transformation: Reflections on a Study of Pentecostalism in Brazil." Pneuma 20, 1 (Spring 1998): 71–84.
- "What Can the Mainline Learn from Pentecostals about Pentecost Preaching." Journal for Preachers 21, 4 (Pentecost 1998): 8-14.

=== Books ===
- Containment and Change (1967), co-authored with Carl Oglesby
