= American Conspiracies (book) =

2010 book by Jesse Ventura

- Author: Jesse Ventura, Dick Russell
- Publisher: Skyhorse Publishing
- Publication date: 2010

American Conspiracies: Lies, Lies, and More Dirty Lies That the Government Tells Us is a book written by former Governor of Minnesota Jesse Ventura, together with Dick Russell. It was published by Skyhorse Publishing in 2010. Initial sales of the book reached 120,000 copies, making the book the top seller for Skyhorse Publishing that year. A second edition of the book was released in 2015 featuring "four or five new conspiracies".

== Overview ==
The book presents and discusses conspiracy theories related to several notable events in the history of the United States, with the first edition covering fourteen events and their conspiracies. The book opens with a quote from Albert Einstein that reads "A foolish faith in authority is the worst enemy of truth". Ventura argues that events such as the assassinations of former U.S. Presidents Abraham Lincoln and John F. Kennedy, the assassinations of Martin Luther King Jr., Malcolm X and Robert F. Kennedy, the Watergate scandal, the Jonestown Massacre, the elections of former U.S. President George W. Bush, and the 2008 financial crisis need to be more thoroughly investigated, and discusses an alleged cover-up of events and information related to the September 11 attacks. Ventura claims the same actors were involved in all of these events, contending that none led to an investigation by local police, and no criminal trials were conducted in any of these cases that might have led to investigation with subpoena power.

In the book, which is in part based on the TV series Conspiracy Theory with Jesse Ventura, Ventura also claims that a CIA operative worked in Minnesota government during his administration, that he was interviewed by a large group of CIA agents about his successful independent campaign for governor of Minnesota, and that the CIA used double agents that deliberately let themselves get caught at the Watergate complex to bring former U.S. President Richard Nixon down.

== Critical reception ==
Writing for The Booklist, Mike Tribby referred to the book as "heady, paranoiac stuff" and concluded that while only some of the book may prove believable, it still serves as an "action-packed read". The Center for Inquiry's Benjamin Radford criticized the lack of "logic and critical thinking" in Ventura's analysis, pointing out that many of his conspiracy discussions did not address the simple and more well known facts, creating a "false-choice logical fallacy" where the only options given are the "official" one or the claim that the events were entirely a conspiracy. OnTheIssues editor in chief Jesse Gordon praised the book, saying it was "a worthwhile read for any American who wants to proudly wear the title of 'citizen'".

Ventura argued that the book was actively "ignored" by mainstream media despite the book being featured for several weeks on The New York Times Best Seller list, as there were few reviews and coverage of the book from news sources.
