= Jesse Ventura =

American wrestler, actor and politician (born 1951)

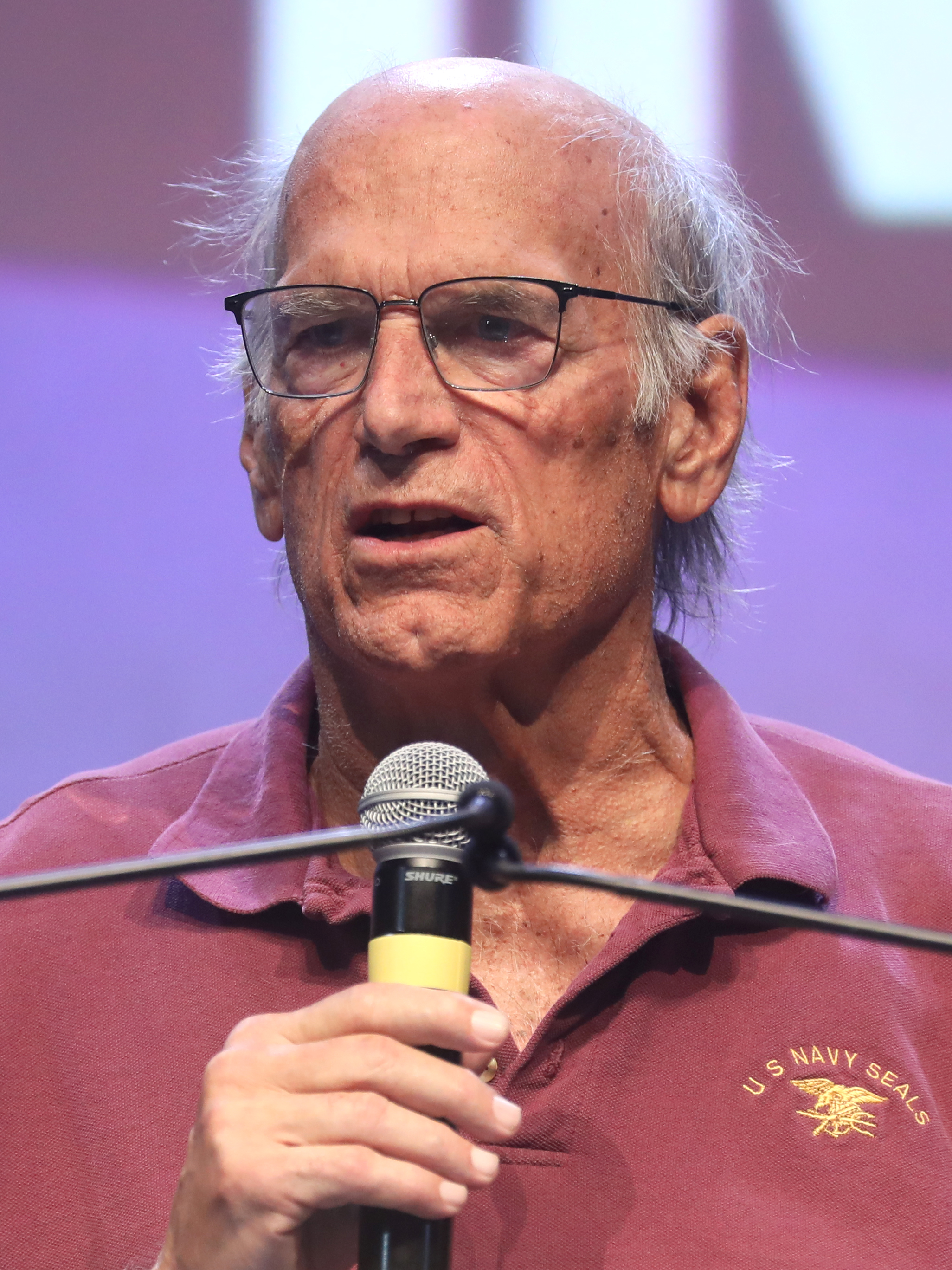
- Ventura in 2024

38th Governor of Minnesota
- In office January 4, 1999 – January 6, 2003
- Lieutenant: Mae Schunk
- Preceded by: Arne Carlson
- Succeeded by: Tim Pawlenty

Mayor of Brooklyn Park
- In office January 11, 1991 – January 13, 1995
- Preceded by: James Krautkremer
- Succeeded by: Grace Arbogast

Personal details
- Born: James George Janos; July 15, 1951 (age 75) Minneapolis, Minnesota, U.S.
- Party: Independent (1969–1998, 2000–present); Reform (1998–2000); Independence Party (2000–2003); Green (2019–2020)
- Spouse: Theresa Larson Masters (m. 1975)
- Children: 2
- Education: North Hennepin Community College (attended)

Military service
- Branch/service: United States Navy
- Years of service: 1969–1975
- Rank: Petty officer third class
- Unit: Underwater Demolition Team 12; SEAL Team 1
- Battles/wars: Vietnam War
- Awards: National Defense Service Medal; Vietnam Service Medal; Republic of Vietnam Campaign Medal; Navy Expeditionary Medal
- Professional wrestling career
- Website: WWE.com profile
- Ring name(s): Jesse "The Body" Ventura; Surf Ventura
- Billed height: 6 ft 2 in (188 cm)
- Billed weight: 245 lb (111 kg)
- Billed from: San Diego, California; Brooklyn Park, Minnesota
- Trained by: Eddie Sharkey
- Debut: 1975
- Retired: March 1986

Jesse Ventura (born James George Janos; July 15, 1951) is an American media personality, author, former politician, and retired professional wrestler. After achieving fame in the World Wrestling Federation, he served as the 38th governor of Minnesota from 1999 to 2003. He was elected governor with the Reform Party and is the party's only candidate to win a major government office.

Born in Minneapolis, Ventura was a member of the Navy Special Operations Underwater Demolition/SEAL Teams during the Vietnam War. After leaving the military, he embarked on a professional wrestling career as a heel from 1975 to 1986, taking the ring name "Jesse 'the Body' Ventura." He had a lengthy tenure in the WWF/WWE as a performer and color commentator and was inducted into the WWE Hall of Fame class of 2004. In addition to wrestling, Ventura pursued an acting career, appearing in films such as Predator and The Running Man.

Ventura entered politics in 1991 when he was elected mayor of Brooklyn Park, Minnesota, a position he held until 1995. He was the Reform Party candidate in the 1998 Minnesota gubernatorial election, running a low-budget campaign centered on grassroots events and unusual advertising that urged citizens not to "vote for politics as usual". Initially ignored as a novelty candidate, Ventura defeated Democratic state attorney general Skip Humphrey and Republican St. Paul mayor Norm Coleman in a major upset. Amid internal fights for control over the party, Ventura left the Reform Party a year after taking office and served the remainder of his term as a member of the Independence Party of Minnesota. Since holding public office, Ventura has referred to himself as a "statesman" instead of a politician.

As governor, Ventura oversaw reforms of Minnesota's property tax as well as the state's first sales tax rebate. Other initiatives he took included construction of the METRO Blue Line light rail in the Minneapolis–Saint Paul metropolitan area and income tax cuts. Ventura did not run for reelection. After leaving office in 2003, he became a visiting fellow at Harvard University's John F. Kennedy School of Government. He has since hosted a number of political television shows on RT America and Ora TV, and written several books. Ventura has been a prominent figure in third-party politics, having repeatedly floated the idea of running for President of the United States as an independent candidate.

In late April 2020, Ventura endorsed the Green Party in the 2020 presidential election and showed interest in running for its nomination. He officially joined the Green Party of Minnesota on May 2. On May 7, he confirmed he would not run. The Green Party of Alaska nominated Ventura, without his involvement, causing the national Green Party to disassociate itself from the Alaska party for abandoning the national party's nominee, Howie Hawkins. In the 2024 presidential election, Ventura endorsed the Democratic ticket of Kamala Harris for president and fellow Minnesota governor Tim Walz for vice president.

== Early life ==
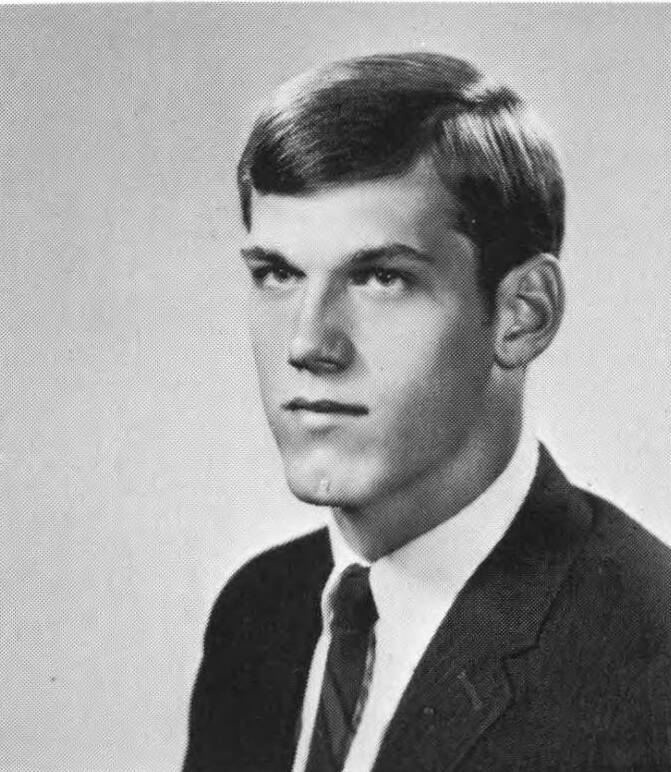
Ventura's High school yearbook portrait

Ventura was born James George Janos on July 15, 1951, in Minneapolis, Minnesota, the son of George William Janos and his wife, Bernice Martha (née Lenz). Both his parents were World War II veterans. His mother was the chief nurse anesthetist at North Memorial Hospital and his father worked for the Minneapolis Street Department.

Ventura has an older brother, Jan, who similarly served in the Vietnam War as a UDT. Jan and Jesse graduated as members of BUD/S classes 49 and 58, respectively. Ventura has described himself as Slovak since his father's parents were from Slovakia; his mother was of German descent. Ventura was raised as a Lutheran. Born in South Minneapolis "by the Lake Street bridge", he attended Cooper Elementary School, Sanford Junior High School, and graduated from Roosevelt High School in 1969. Roosevelt High School inducted Ventura into its first hall of fame in September 2014.

=== Navy ===
Ventura served in the United States Navy from December 1, 1969, to September 10, 1975. He graduated in BUD/S class 58 in December 1970, was part of Underwater Demolition Team 12 while on active duty, and was assigned to SEAL Team One from 1973 through 1975 as a reservist. While on active duty, he served in the Mekong Delta, was attached to an amphibious ready group in the South China Sea, and homeported out of Subic Bay in the Philippines. He was awarded the Vietnam Service Medal, Republic of Vietnam Campaign Medal, and the Navy Expeditionary Medal.

Ventura has frequently referred to his military career in public statements and debates. He was criticized by hunters and conservationists for saying in a 2001 interview with the Minneapolis Star Tribune, "Until you have hunted men, you haven't hunted yet."

=== Post-Navy ===
Near the end of his Navy service, Ventura began to spend time with the "South Bay" chapter of the Mongols Motorcycle Club in San Diego. He would ride onto Naval Base Coronado on his Harley-Davidson wearing his Mongol "colors". According to Ventura, he was a "full-patch" member of the club and third-in-command of his chapter, but never had any problems with the authorities. His biker nickname was "Superman". In 1974, Ventura left the bike club to return to the Twin Cities. Shortly after that, the Mongols entered into open warfare with their biker rivals, the Hells Angels. In 2018, Ventura testified as an expert witness on the Mongols' behalf in a federal racketeering trial in Santa Ana, California, defending the club against the government's characterization of the Mongols as a criminal enterprise. He testified that he remained an inactive member of the Mongols and called his time as an active member of the club's San Diego chapter "a stepping stone I needed to make the transition from military life back to civilian life. I owe them for being there for me when the rest of the world wasn't".

Ventura attended North Hennepin Community College in Brooklyn Park, Minnesota, during the mid-1970s on the G.I. Bill. He was a bodyguard for The Rolling Stones and the Grateful Dead for a time before entering professional wrestling and adopting the wrestling name Jesse Ventura.

== Professional wrestling career ==
=== Early career (1975–1979) ===
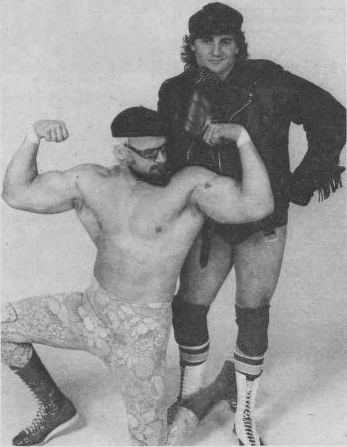
Ventura and Adrian Adonis, c. 1982

Ventura created the stage name Jesse "The Body" Ventura to go with the persona of a bully-ish beach bodybuilder, picking the name "Ventura" from a map as part of his "bleach blond from California" gimmick. As a wrestler, Ventura performed as a heel. He resurrected Gorgeous George's old motto of "Win if you can, lose if you must, but always cheat!", which he emblazoned on his t-shirts. Much of this flamboyant persona was adapted from "Superstar" Billy Graham, a charismatic and popular performer during the 1970s.

In 1975, Ventura made his debut in the Central States territory, before moving to the Pacific Northwest, where he wrestled for promoter Don Owen as Jesse "The Great" Ventura. During his stay in Portland, Oregon, he had notable feuds with Dutch Savage and Jimmy Snuka and won the Pacific Northwest Wrestling title twice (once from each wrestler) and the tag team title five times (twice each with Bull Ramos and "Playboy" Buddy Rose, and once with Jerry Oates).

=== American Wrestling Association (1979–1984) ===
Ventura later moved to his hometown promotion, the American Wrestling Association in Minnesota. He began teaming with Adrian Adonis as the "East-West Connection" in 1979. In his RF Video shoot in 2012, Ventura revealed that shortly after he arrived in the AWA, Verne Gagne gave him the nickname "the Body". On July 20, 1980, the duo won the AWA World Tag Team Championship by forfeit when Gagne, half of the tag-team champions along with Mad Dog Vachon, failed to show up for a title defense in Denver. The duo held the belts for nearly a year, losing to "The High Flyers" (Greg Gagne and Jim Brunzell). Ventura worked for AWA until 1984.

=== Move to the WWF, retirement, and commentary (1981–1991) ===
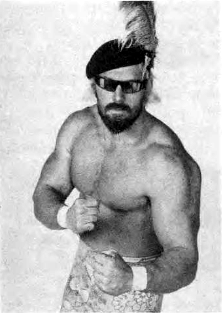
Ventura, c. 1982

Shortly after losing the belts, the duo moved on to the World Wrestling Federation, where they were managed by Freddie Blassie. Although the duo was unable to capture the World Tag Team Championship, both Adonis and Ventura became singles title contenders, each earning several title shots at WWF Heavyweight Champion Bob Backlund.

Ventura continued to wrestle until September 1984 after three back-to-back losses to world champion Hulk Hogan, when blood clots in his lungs effectively ended his in-ring career. He said the clots were a result of his exposure to Agent Orange during his time in Vietnam. Ventura returned to the ring in 1985, forming a tag-team with Randy Savage and Savage's manager (and real-life wife) Miss Elizabeth. After their televised matches, Ventura often taunted and challenged fellow commentator Bruno Sammartino, but nothing ever came of this.

Ventura participated in a six-man tag-team match in December 1985 when he, Roddy Piper, and Bob Orton defeated Hillbilly Jim, Uncle Elmer, and Cousin Luke in a match broadcast on Saturday Night's Main Event IV. The tag match against the Hillbillies came about after Piper and Orton interrupted Elmer's wedding ceremony on the previous edition of the show; Ventura, who later claimed that he was under instruction from fellow commentator and WWF owner Vince McMahon to "bury them", insulted Elmer and his wife during commentary of a real wedding ceremony at the Meadowlands Arena, by proclaiming when they kissed: "It looks like two carp in the middle of the Mississippi River going after the same piece of corn." According to Ventura, the wedding was real, for at that time the New Jersey State Athletic Control Board would not allow the WWF to stage a fake wedding in the state of New Jersey, so Stan Frazier (Uncle Elmer) and his fiancee had agreed to have a real in-ring wedding.

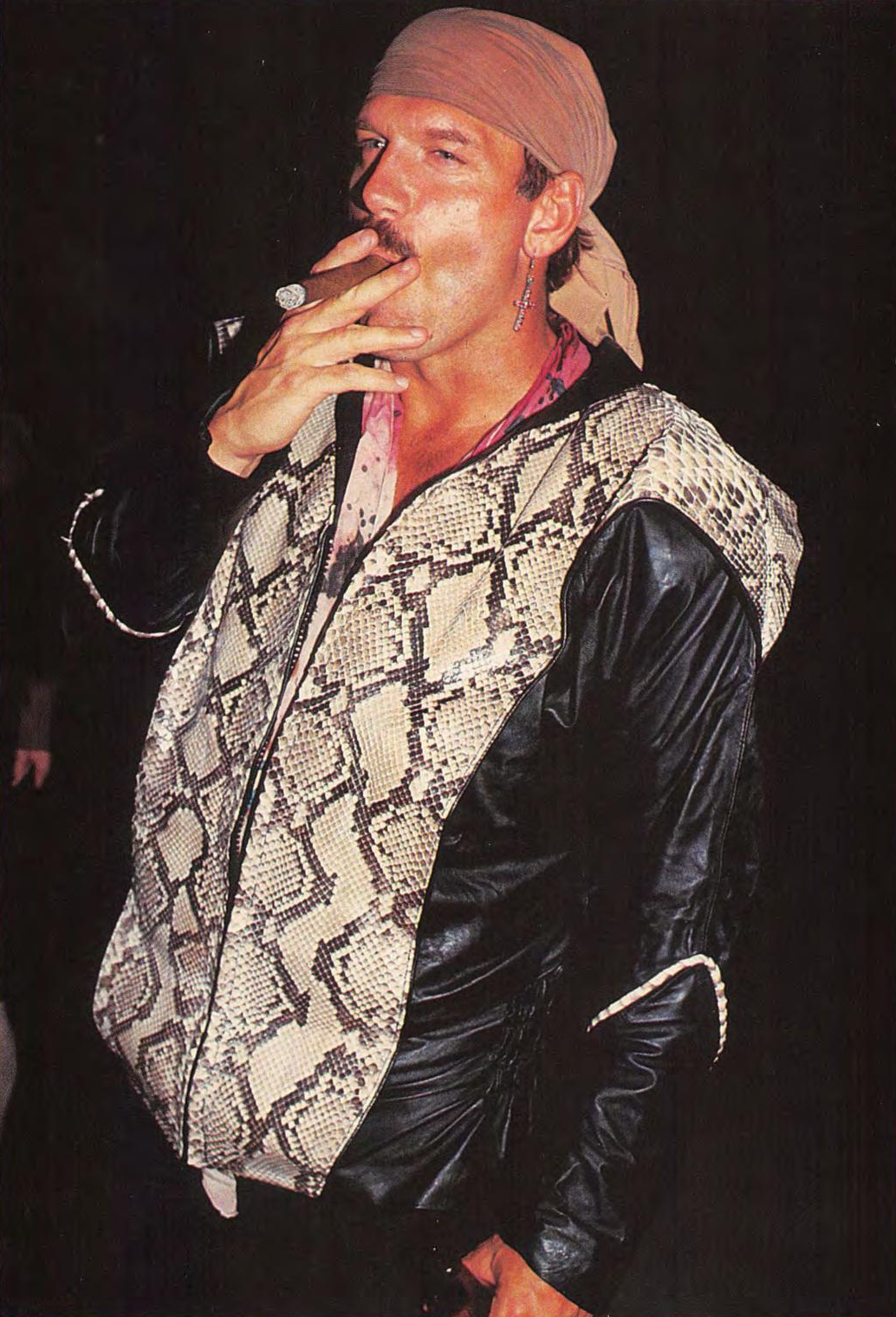
Ventura smoking a cigar, c. 1987

Ventura retired from wrestling in March 1986. His final match was a tag with Roddy Piper, defeating The Orient Express at a house show in Los Angeles on March 25, 1990.

After a failed comeback bid, Ventura hosted his own talk segment on the WWF's All Star Wrestling TV program called "The Body Shop", in much the same heel style as "Piper's Pit", though the setting was a mock gym (when Ventura was unavailable, "The Body Shop" was often hosted by Don Muraco). He began to do color commentary on television for All-Star Wrestling, replacing Angelo Mosca, and later Superstars of Wrestling, initially alongside Vince McMahon and the semi-retired Sammartino, and then just with McMahon after Sammartino's departure from the WWF in early 1988. Ventura most notably co-hosted Saturday Night's Main Event with McMahon, the first six WrestleManias (five of which were alongside Gorilla Monsoon), and most of the WWF's pay-per-views at the time with Monsoon, with the lone exception for Ventura being the first SummerSlam, in which he served as the guest referee during the main event.

Ventura's entertaining commentary style was an extension of his wrestling persona, i.e., a "heel", as he was partial to the villains, something new and different at the time. McMahon, who was always looking for ways to jazz things up, came up with the idea of Ventura doing heel commentary at a time when most commentators, including McMahon himself, openly rooted for the fan favorites.

But Ventura still occasionally gave credit where it was due, praising the athleticism of fan favorites such as Ricky Steamboat and Randy Savage, whom Ventura championed for years, even when he was a face, a point Ventura regularly made on-air to McMahon and Monsoon. He occasionally acknowledged mistakes made by the heels, including those made by his personal favorites such as Savage or wrestlers managed by heels Bobby Heenan and Jimmy Hart.

One notable exception to this rule was the WrestleMania VI Ultimate Challenge title for title match between WWF Champion Hulk Hogan and the WWF Intercontinental Champion, The Ultimate Warrior. Since they were both fan favorites, Ventura was neutral in his commentary, even praising Hogan's display of sportsmanship at the end of the match when he handed over the WWF Championship belt to the Warrior, saying that Hogan was going out like a true champion. During the match, however, which was also the last match at WrestleMania he called, Ventura did voice his pleasure when both broke the rules, at one point saying: "This is what I like. Let the two goody two-shoes throw the rulebook out and get nasty." Ventura's praise of Hogan was unusual because he regularly rooted against Hogan during his matches, usually telling Monsoon after Hogan had won a championship match at a WrestleMania that he might "come out of retirement and take this dude out".

Hogan and Ventura were at one point close friends, but Ventura abruptly ended the friendship in 1994 after he discovered, during his lawsuit against McMahon, that Hogan had told McMahon about Ventura's attempt to form a labor union in 1986 before WrestleMania 2. After a dispute with McMahon over the use of his image for promoting a Sega product, Ventura left the WWF in August 1990.

Ventura later served as a radio announcer for a few National Football League teams, among them the Minnesota Vikings and Tampa Bay Buccaneers.

=== World Championship Wrestling (1992–1994) ===
In February 1992 at SuperBrawl II, Ventura joined World Championship Wrestling as a commentator. WCW President Eric Bischoff ultimately released him for allegedly falling asleep during a WCW Worldwide TV taping at Disney MGM Studios in July 1994, but it has been speculated that the move may have had more to do with Hogan's arrival shortly before.

=== Litigation ===
In 1987, while negotiating his contract as a WWF commentator, Ventura waived his rights to royalties on videotape sales when he was falsely told that only feature performers received such royalties. In November 1991, having discovered that other non-feature performers received royalties, Ventura brought an action for fraud, misappropriation of publicity rights, and quantum meruit in Minnesota state court against Titan Sports, asking for $2 million (~$4.21 million in 2025) in royalties based on a fair market value share. Titan moved the case to federal court, and Ventura won an $801,333 jury verdict on the last claim. In addition, the judge awarded him $8,625 in back pay for all non-video WWF merchandising featuring Ventura. The judgment was affirmed on appeal, and the case, 65 F.3d 725 (8th Cir.1995), is an important result in the law of restitution. As a result, Ventura's commentary is removed on most releases from WWE Home Video.

=== Return to the WWF/WWE (1999–present) ===
In mid-1999, Ventura reappeared on WWF television during his term as governor of Minnesota, acting as the special guest referee for the main event of SummerSlam, held in Minneapolis. He continued his relationship with the WWF by doing commentary for Vince McMahon's short-lived XFL.

On the June 4, 2001, episode of Raw, which aired live from Minnesota, Ventura appeared to overrule McMahon's authority and approve a WWF championship match between then-champion Stone Cold Steve Austin and Chris Jericho. The same night, he managed the Minnesota Stretching Crew (Brock Lesnar and Shelton Benjamin) when they defeated Scotty Zappa and Magnus Maximus in a dark match.

On the March 20, 2003, episode of SmackDown!, Ventura appeared in a taped interview to talk about the match between McMahon and Hogan at WrestleMania XIX.

On March 13, 2004, Ventura was inducted into the WWE Hall of Fame. The next night, at WrestleMania XX, he approached the ring to interview Donald Trump, who had a front-row seat. Trump affirmed that Ventura would receive his moral and financial support were he to reenter politics. Alluding to the 2008 election, Ventura announced, "I think we oughta put a wrestler in the White House in 2008!"

Ventura was guest host on the November 23, 2009, episode of Raw, during which he retained his heel persona by siding with the number one contender Sheamus over WWE Champion John Cena. This happened while he confronted Cena about how it was unfair that Cena always got a title shot in the WWE while Ventura never did during his WWE career. After that, Sheamus attacked Cena and put him through a table. Ventura then made the match a Table match at TLC: Tables, Ladders and Chairs. During the show, for the first time in nearly 20 years, McMahon joined Ventura ringside to provide match commentary.

On December 14, 2024, Ventura returned to Saturday Night's Main Event. He dual broadcast the show with Joe Tessitore and called the main event match for the Undisputed WWE Championship between Undisputed WWE Champion Cody Rhodes and Kevin Owens with Michael Cole and Pat McAfee.

On January 25, 2025, Ventura returned to Saturday Night's Main Event XXXVIII, again dual broadcasting the show with Joe Tessitore. He called the WWE Intercontinental Championship match between Intercontinental Champion Bron Breakker and Sheamus alongside Michael Cole and Pat McAfee. On May 24, he returned for Saturday Night's Main Event XXXIX, calling the steel cage match between Drew McIntyre and Damian Priest.

== Acting career ==
Near the end of his wrestling career, Ventura began an acting career. He appeared in the movie Predator (1987), whose cast included future California governor Arnold Schwarzenegger and future Kentucky gubernatorial candidate Sonny Landham. Ventura became close friends with Schwarzenegger during the production of Predator. He appeared in two episodes of Zorro filmed in Madrid, Spain, in 1991. He had a starring role in the 1990 sci-fi movie Abraxas, Guardian of the Universe. He had supporting roles in The Running Man, No Holds Barred, Thunderground, Demolition Man, Repossessed, Ricochet, The Master of Disguise (in which he steals the Liberty Bell), Ready to Rumble, and Batman & Robin—the first and last of these movies also starring Schwarzenegger. Ventura made a cameo appearance in Major League II as "White Lightning". He appeared as a self-help guru (voice only) in The Ringer, trying to turn Johnny Knoxville into a more confident worker. Ventura had a cameo in The X-Files episode "Jose Chung's From Outer Space" as a Man in Black alongside fellow 'MiB' Alex Trebek. In 2008, Ventura was in the independent comedy Woodshop, starring as high school shop teacher Mr. Madson. The film was released on September 7, 2010.

=== Filmography ===
Year	Title	Role
1987	Predator	Sergeant Blain Cooper
1987	The Running Man	"Captain Freedom"
1989	Thunderground	The Man
1989	No Holds Barred	Himself
1990	Abraxas, Guardian of the Universe	Abraxas
1990	Repossessed	Himself
1991	Tagteam	Bobby Youngblood
1991	Ricochet	Jake Chewalski
1993	Living and Working in Space: The Countdown Has Begun	DMV Testee
1993	Demolition Man	CryoCon
1994	Major League II	Himself
1997	Batman & Robin	Arkham Asylum Guard
2000	Ready to Rumble	Himself
2001	Joe Somebody	Himself
2002	The Master of Disguise	Himself
2003	Stuck on You	Himself
2005	The Ringer	Motivational Speaker
2008	Borders	Conrad
2010	Woodshop	Mr. Madson
2014	The Drunk	Governor Littleton

=== Other media ===
Ventura was a bodyguard for The Rolling Stones in the late 1970s and 1980s. Its lead singer, Mick Jagger, said of him, "He's done us proud, hasn't he? He's been fantastic."

In the late 1980s, Ventura appeared in a series of Miller Lite commercials.

In 1989, Ventura co-hosted the four episodes of the DiC Entertainment children's program Record Breakers: World of Speed along with Gary Apple. In 1991, the pilot episode for Tag Team, a television program about two ex-professional wrestlers turned police officers, starred Ventura and Roddy Piper.

Ventura also co-hosted the short-lived syndicated game show The Grudge Match alongside sportscaster Steve Albert.

Between 1995 and 1998, Ventura had radio call-in shows on KFAN 1130 and KSTP 1500 in Minneapolis–Saint Paul. He also had a brief role on the television soap opera The Young and the Restless in 1999.

Ventura has been criticized by the press for profiting from his heightened popularity. He was hired as a television analyst for the failed XFL football league in 2001, served as a referee at a WWF SummerSlam match in 1999, and published several books during his tenure as governor. On his weekly radio show, he often criticized the media for focusing on these deals rather than his policy proposals.

From 2009 to 2012, TruTV aired three seasons of the television series Conspiracy Theory with Jesse Ventura.

Ventura had a guest spot on an episode of the 2012 rebooted Teenage Mutant Ninja Turtles animated series on Nickelodeon.

In 2013, Ventura announced a new show, Jesse Ventura: Uncensored, which launched on January 27, 2014, and later renamed Off the Grid, and aired until 2016 on Ora TV, an online video on demand network founded by Larry King.

In 2017, Ventura became the host of the show The World According to Jesse on RT America; the series ended in March 2022 when RT programming produced by its production partner Ora TV was suspended after Russia's invasion of Ukraine. RT America ceased operations on March 3, 2022.

== Political career ==
=== Mayor of Brooklyn Park ===
1990 Brooklyn Park mayoral election
- November 6, 1990
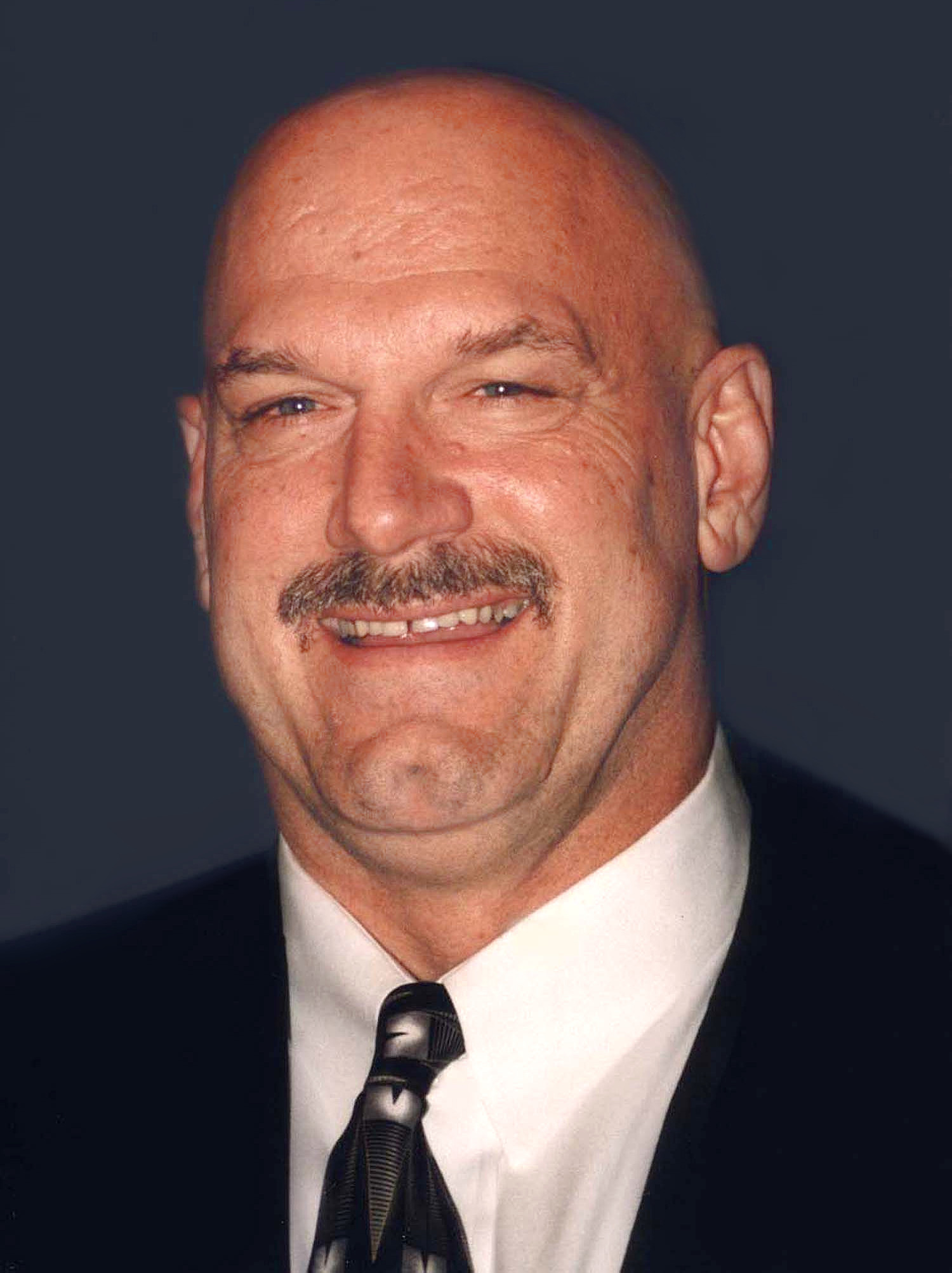

Nominee	Jesse Ventura	Jim Krautkremer
Party	Nonpartisan	Nonpartisan
Popular vote	12,728	7,390
Percentage	63.27%	36.73%

After his departure from the WWF, Ventura took a former high school teacher's advice and ran for mayor of Brooklyn Park, Minnesota, in 1990. He defeated the city's 18-year incumbent mayor and served from 1991 to 1995. Many professional wrestling personalities have entered politics, but Ventura is among the few, including Jim Barnett and Antonio Inoki, to have remained active in wrestling while serving in a government role: he was simultaneously mayor and WCW's color commentator through much of his mayoral tenure.

=== Governor of Minnesota ===
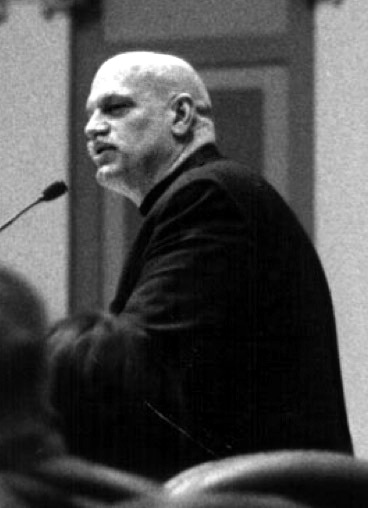
Ventura in the Minnesota House of Representatives Chamber in 2000

Ventura ran for governor of Minnesota in 1998 as the Reform Party of Minnesota nominee (he later joined the Independence Party of Minnesota when the Reform Party broke from its association with the Reform Party of the United States of America). His campaign consisted of a combination of aggressive grassroots events organized in part by his campaign manager Doug Friedline and original television spots, designed by quirky adman Bill Hillsman, using the phrase "Don't vote for politics as usual." He spent considerably less than his opponents (about $300,000) and was a pioneer in his using the Internet as a medium of reaching out to voters in a political campaign. He selected teacher Mae Schunk as his running mate.

He won the election in November 1998, narrowly and unexpectedly defeating the major-party nominees, Republican St. Paul mayor Norm Coleman and Democratic-Farmer-Labor Attorney General Hubert H. "Skip" Humphrey III. During his victory speech, Ventura famously declared, "We shocked the world!" After his election, bumper stickers and T-shirts bearing the slogan "My governor can beat up your governor" appeared in Minnesota. The nickname "Jesse 'The Mind'" (from a last-minute Hillsman ad featuring Ventura posing as Rodin's Thinker) began to resurface in ironic reference to his often controversial remarks. Ventura's old stage name "Jesse 'The Body'" (sometimes adapted to "Jesse 'The Governing Body'") also continued to appear with some regularity.

After a 2002 trade mission to China, Ventura announced that he would not run for reelection, saying that he no longer felt dedicated enough to his job and accusing the media of hounding him and his family for personal behavior and beliefs while neglecting important policy issues. He later told a Boston Globe reporter that he would have run for a second term if he had been single, citing the media's effect on his family life.

Ventura sparked media criticism when, nearing the end of his term, he suggested that he might resign from office early to allow his lieutenant governor, Mae Schunk, an opportunity to serve as governor. He said he wanted her to be the state's first female governor and have her portrait painted and hung in the Capitol along with the other governors'. Ventura quickly retreated from the comments, saying he was just floating an idea.

==== Political positions as governor ====
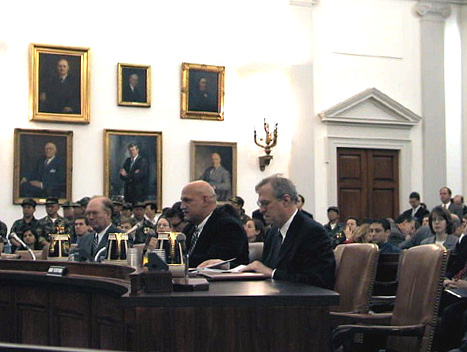
Minnesota Governor Ventura (center) testifies on China's participation in the WTO, March 2000

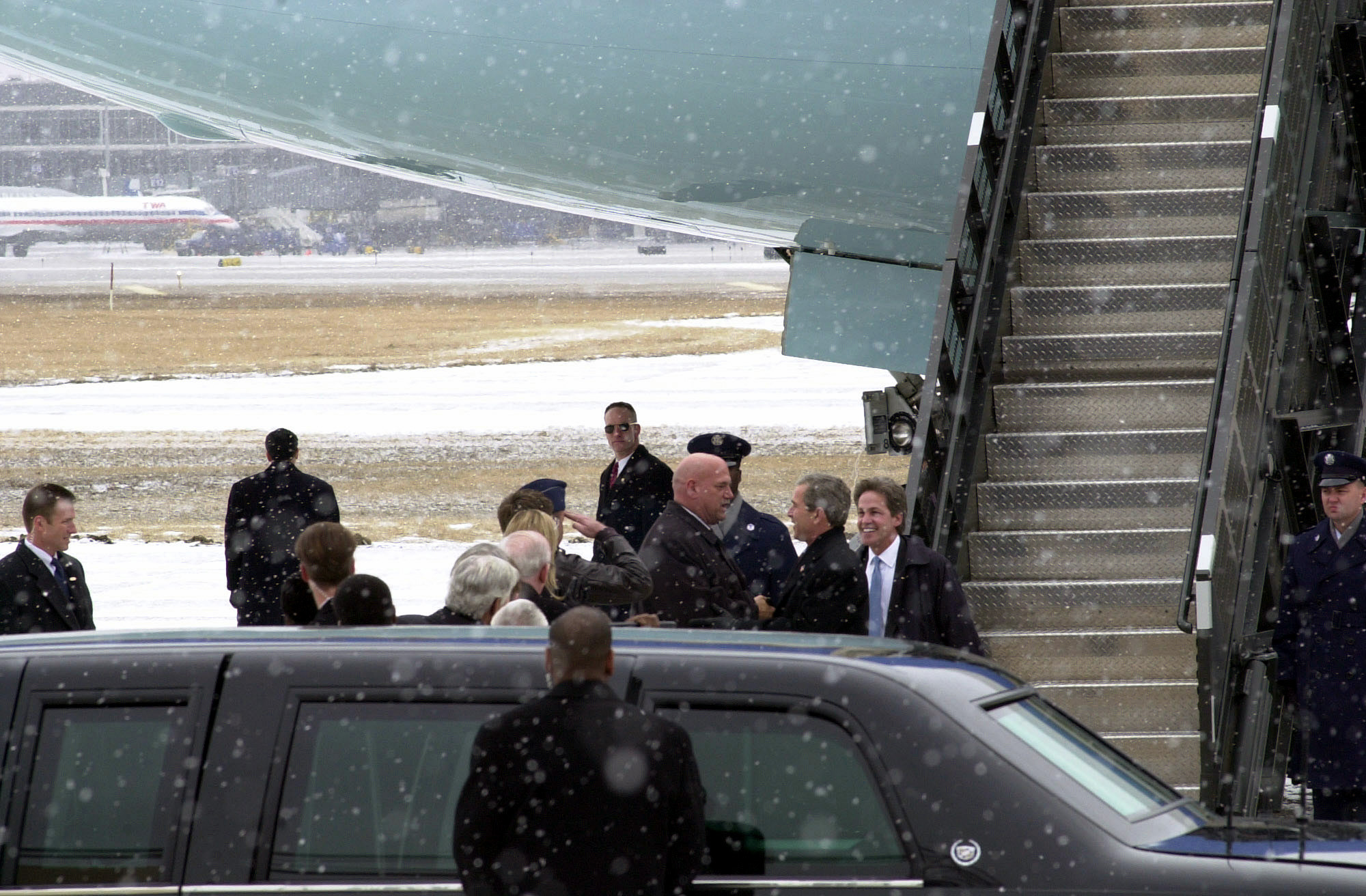
Ventura greeting President George W. Bush and Norm Coleman in 2002

In political debates, Ventura often admitted that he had not formed an opinion on certain policy questions. He often called himself "fiscally conservative and socially liberal."

Lacking a party base in the Minnesota House of Representatives and Senate, Ventura's policy ambitions had little chance of being introduced as bills. He vetoed 45 bills in his first year, only three of which were overridden. The reputation for having his vetoes overridden comes from his fourth and final year, when six of his nine vetoes were overridden. Nevertheless, Ventura succeeded with some of his initiatives. One of the most notable was the rebate on sales tax; each year of his administration, Minnesotans received a tax-free check in the late summer. The state was running a budget surplus at the time, and Ventura believed the money should be returned.

Later, Ventura came to support a unicameral (one-house) legislature, property tax reform, gay rights, recreational marijuana, and abortion rights. While funding public school education generously, he opposed the teachers' union, and did not have a high regard for public funding of higher education institutions.

In an interview on The Howard Stern Show, he reaffirmed his support of gay rights, including marriage and military service, humorously saying he would have gladly served alongside homosexuals when he was in the Navy as they would have provided less competition for women. Later, on the subject of a 2012 referendum on amending the Minnesota Constitution to limit marriage to male-female couples, Ventura said, "I certainly hope that people don't amend our constitution to stop gay marriage because, number one, the constitution is there to protect people, not oppress them", and related a story from his wrestling days of a friend who was denied hospital visitation to his same-sex partner.

During the first part of his administration, Ventura strongly advocated for land-use reform and substantial mass transit improvements, such as light rail.

During another trade mission to Cuba in the summer of 2002, he denounced the United States embargo against Cuba, saying the embargo affected the Cuban public more than it did its government.

Ventura greatly disapproved of some of the events at the 2002 memorial for Senator Paul Wellstone, his family, and others who died in a plane crash on October 25, 2002. Ventura said, "I feel used. I feel violated and duped over the fact that the memorial ceremony turned into a political rally". He left halfway through the controversial speech made by Wellstone's best friend, Rick Kahn. Ventura had initially planned to appoint a Democrat to Wellstone's seat, but instead appointed Dean Barkley to represent Minnesota in the Senate until Wellstone's term expired in January 2003. Barkley was succeeded by Norm Coleman, who won the seat against Walter Mondale, who replaced Wellstone as the Democratic nominee after Wellstone died a few days before the election.

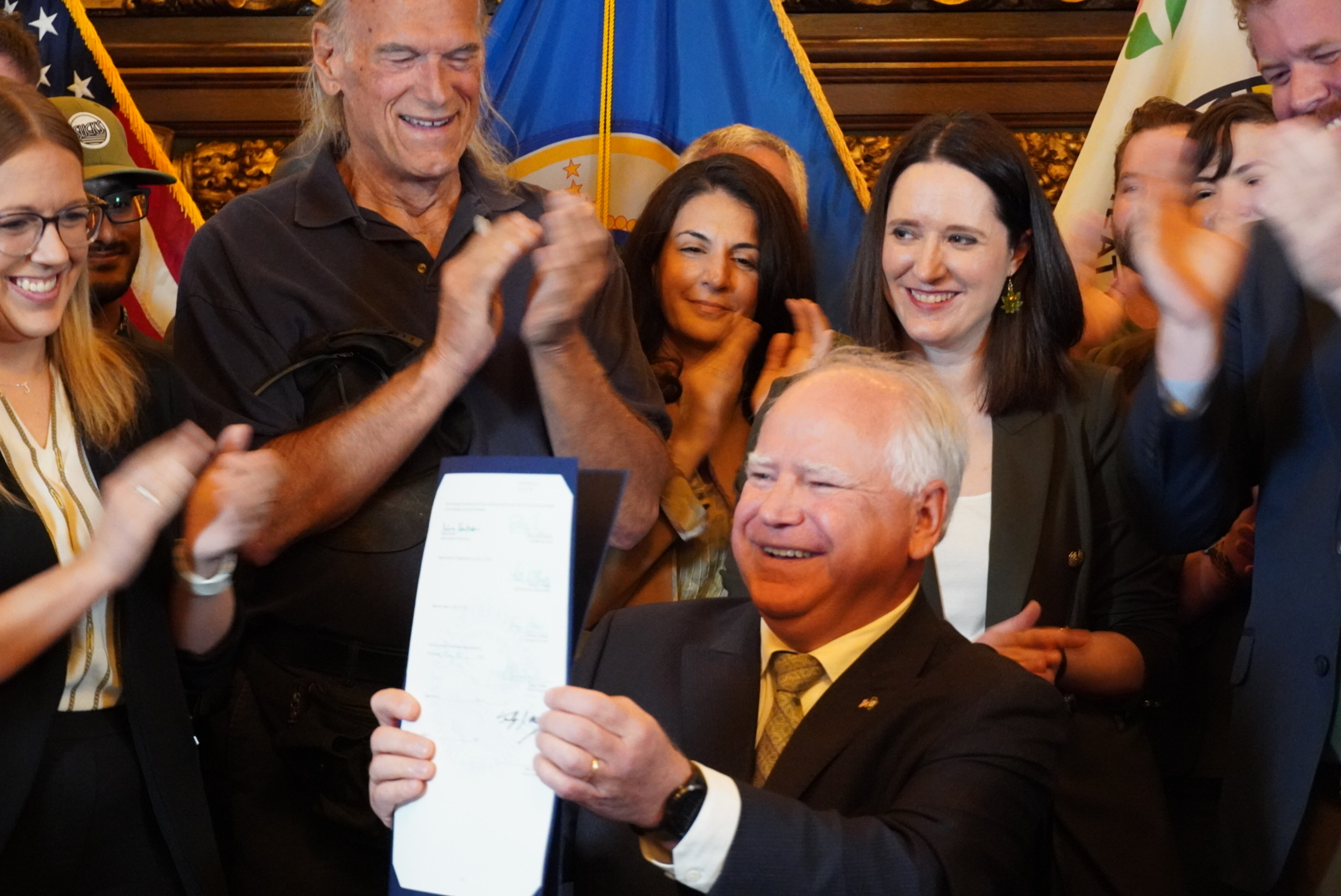
An advocate for cannabis reform as governor, Ventura returned to the State Capitol in May 2023 for Governor Tim Walz's signing of a cannabis legalization bill.

Ventura, who ran on a Reform Party ticket and advocated for a greater role for third parties in American politics, is highly critical of both Democrats and Republicans. He has called both parties "monsters that are out of control", concerned only with "their own agendas and their pork."

In his book Independent Nation, political analyst John Avlon calls Ventura a radical centrist thinker and activist.

==== Assessment and criticism ====
After the legislature refused to increase spending for security, Ventura attracted criticism when he decided not to live in the Minnesota Governor's Residence during his tenure, choosing instead to shut it down and stay at his home in Maple Grove.

In 1999, a group of disgruntled citizens petitioned to recall Governor Ventura, alleging, among other things, that "the use of state security personnel to protect the governor on a book promotion tour constituted illegal use of state property for personal gain." The proposed petition was dismissed by order of the Chief Justice of the Minnesota Supreme Court. Under Minnesota law, the Chief Justice must review recall petitions for legal sufficiency, and, upon such review, the Chief Justice determined that it did not allege the commission of any act that violated Minnesota law. Ventura sought attorney's fees as a sanction for the filing of a frivolous petition for recall, but that request was denied on the ground that there was no statutory authority for such an award.

Ventura was also criticized for mishandling the Minnesota state budget, with Minnesota state economist Tom Stinson noting that the statewide capital gain fell from $9 billion to $4 billion between 2000 and 2001. Ventura had vetoed this budget, but the state legislature overrode him. This deficit received national attention, for instance making a 10-question interview by Time journalist Matthew Cooper with Ventura. When Ventura left office in 2003, Minnesota had a $4.2 billion budget deficit, compared to the $3 billion budget surplus when Ventura took office in 1999.

During his tenure as governor, Ventura drew frequent fire from the Twin Cities press. He called reporters "media jackals", with the label "Official Jackal" even appearing on the press passes required to enter his press area. Shortly after Ventura was elected, author and humorist Garrison Keillor wrote a satirical book about him, Me: Jimmy (Big Boy) Valente, depicting a self-aggrandizing former "Navy W.A.L.R.U.S. (Water Air Land Rising Up Suddenly)" turned professional wrestler turned politician. Ventura initially responded angrily to the book, but later said Keillor "makes Minnesota proud". During his term, Ventura appeared on the Late Show with David Letterman, in which he responded controversially to the following question: "So which is the better city of the Twin Cities, Minneapolis or St. Paul?". Ventura responded, "Minneapolis. Those streets in St. Paul must have been designed by drunken Irishmen". He later apologized for the remark, saying it was not intended to be taken seriously.

Ventura's approval rating peaked at 73% in July 1999. By the end of his term it had fallen to 40%.

=== Consideration of bids for other political offices ===
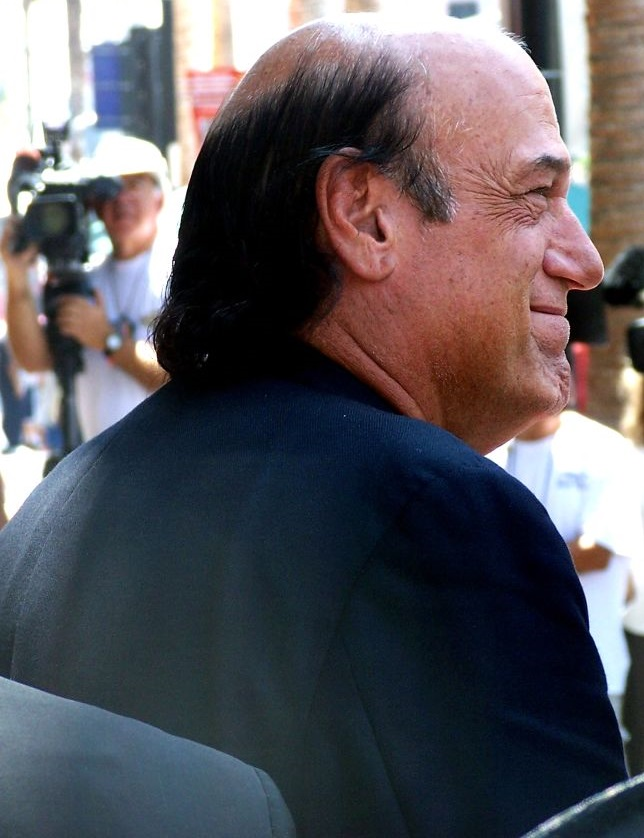
Ventura in 2007

While Ventura has not held public office since the end of his term as governor in 2003, he has remained politically active and occasionally hinted at running again for political office. In an April 7, 2008, interview on CNN's The Situation Room, Ventura said he was considering entering the race for the United States Senate seat then held by Norm Coleman, his Republican opponent in the 1998 gubernatorial race. A Twin Cities station Fox 9 poll put him at 24%, behind Democratic candidate Al Franken at 32% and Coleman at 39% in a hypothetical three-way race. On Larry King Live on July 14, 2008, Ventura said he would not run, partly out of concern for his family's privacy. Franken won the election by a very narrow margin.

In his 1999 autobiography I Ain't Got Time to Bleed, Ventura suggested that he did not plan to run for president of the United States but did not rule it out. In 2003, he expressed interest in running for president while accepting an award from the International Wrestling Institute and Museum in Newton, Iowa. He spoke at Republican presidential candidate Ron Paul's "Rally for the Republic", organized by the Campaign for Liberty, on September 2, 2008, and implied a possible future run for president. At the end of his speech, Ventura announced if he saw that the public was willing to see a change in the direction of the country, then "in 2012 we'll give them a race they'll never forget!" In 2011, Ventura expressed interest in running with Ron Paul in the 2012 presidential election if Paul would run as an independent. On November 4, 2011, Ventura said at a press conference about the dismissal of his court case against the Transportation Security Administration for what he claimed were illegal searches of air travelers that he was "thinking about" running for president. Ventura was reportedly in talks with the Libertarian Party to run for president on its ticket, but party chairman Mark Hinkle said, "Jesse is more interested in 2016 than he is in 2012. But I think he's serious. If Ron Paul ran as a Libertarian, I think he definitely would be interested in running as a vice presidential candidate. He's thinking, 'If I run as the vice presidential candidate under Ron Paul in 2012, I could run as a presidential candidate in 2016'."

David Gewirtz of ZDNet wrote in a November 2011 article that he thought Ventura could win if he declared his intention to run at that point and ran a serious campaign, but that it would be a long shot. In late 2015, Ventura publicly flirted with the idea of running for president in 2016 as a Libertarian but allowed his self-imposed deadline of May 1 to pass. He also expressed an openness to be either Donald Trump's or Bernie Sanders's running mate in 2016. Ventura tried to officially endorse Sanders but his endorsement was rejected. Ventura then endorsed former New Mexico Governor Gary Johnson, the Libertarian nominee, saying, "Johnson is a very viable alternative" and "This is the year for a third-party candidate to rise if there ever was one." Despite this, he later said he voted for Green Party nominee Jill Stein.

=== Unauthorized 2020 presidential campaign ===
Ventura expressed interest in running for president again in 2020, but said he would do so only under the Green Party banner. "The [Green Party] has shown some interest. I haven't made a decision yet because it's a long time off. If I do do it, Trump will not have a chance. For one, Trump knows wrestling. He participated in two WrestleManias. He knows he can never out-talk a wrestler, and he knows I'm the greatest talker wrestling's ever had."

On April 27, 2020, Ventura submitted a letter of interest to the Green Party Presidential Support Committee, the first step to seeking the Green Party's presidential nomination. In May, he announced that he would not run for health reasons, explaining that he would lose his employer-provided health insurance.

Ventura said he would write in his own name in the presidential election, but would support Green candidates in down-ballot races. He said he "refuse[d] to vote for 'the lesser of two evils' because in the end, that's still choosing evil." Ventura received seven presidential delegate votes at the 2020 Green National Convention, having been awarded them through write-in votes in the 2020 Green primaries. The national Green Party nominated Howie Hawkins for president and Angela Nicole Walker for vice president, but the Green Party of Alaska nominated Ventura and former representative Cynthia McKinney without Ventura's consent. Ventura and McKinney received 0.7% of the Alaska popular vote.

=== Political views ===
==== Bush administration and torture ====
In a May 11, 2009, interview with Larry King, Ventura twice said that George W. Bush was the worst president of his lifetime, adding "President Obama inherited something I wouldn't wish on my worst enemy. You know? Two wars, an economy that's borderline depression." On the issue of waterboarding, Ventura added:

I will criticize President Obama on this level: it's a good thing I'm not president because I would prosecute every person that was involved in that torture. I would prosecute the people that did it. I would prosecute the people that ordered it. Because torture is against the law. [King: And you were a Navy SEAL.] That's right, and I was waterboarded... at SERE school, Survival Escape Resistance Evasion [sic]. It was a required school you had to go to prior to going into the combat zone, which in my era was Vietnam. All of us had to go there. We were all in essence, every one of us was waterboarded. It is torture. [King: What was it like?] It's drowning. It gives you the complete sensation that you are drowning. It's no good, because you—I'll put it to you this way, you give me a water board, Dick Cheney, and one hour, and I'll have him confess to the Sharon Tate murders... If it's done wrong, you certainly could drown. You could swallow your tongue. [It] could do a whole bunch of stuff to you. If it's done wrong or—it's torture, Larry. It's torture.

==== Questions about 9/11 ====
In April and May 2008, in several radio interviews for his new book Don't Start the Revolution Without Me, Ventura expressed concern about what he called unanswered questions about 9/11. His remarks about the possibility that the World Trade Center was demolished with explosives were repeated in newspaper and television stories after some of the interviews.

On May 18, 2009, when asked by Sean Hannity of Fox News how George W. Bush could have avoided the September 11 attacks, Ventura answered, "And there it is again—you pay attention to memos on August 6th that tell you exactly what bin Laden's gonna do."

On April 9, 2011, when Piers Morgan of CNN asked Ventura for his official view of the events of 9/11, Ventura said, "My theory of 9/11 is that we certainly—at the best we knew it was going to happen. They allowed it to happen to further their agenda in the Middle East and go to these wars."

== Other endeavors ==
=== Post-gubernatorial life ===
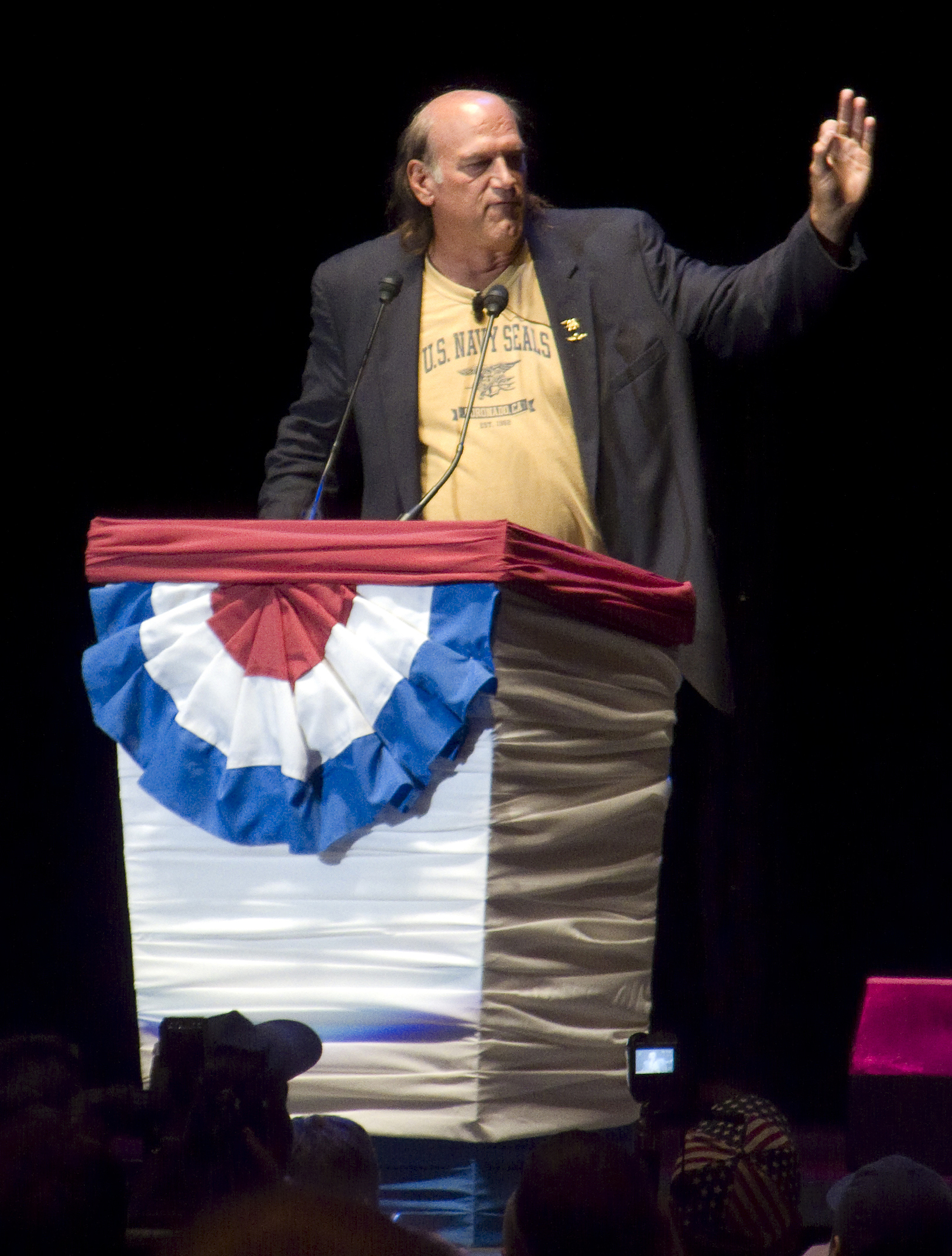
Ventura orating at Ron Paul's "Rally for the Republic" in 2008

Ventura was succeeded in office on January 6, 2003, by Republican Tim Pawlenty.

In October 2003, he began a weekly MSNBC show, Jesse Ventura's America; the show was canceled after a couple of months. Ventura has alleged it was canceled because he opposed the Iraq War. MSNBC honored the balance of his three-year contract, legally preventing him from doing any other TV or news shows.

On October 22, 2004, with Ventura by his side, former Maine Governor Angus King endorsed John Kerry for president at the Minnesota state capitol building. Ventura did not speak at the press conference. When prodded for a statement, King responded, "He plans to vote for John Kerry, but he doesn't want to make a statement and subject himself to the tender mercies of the Minnesota press". In the 2012 Senate elections, Ventura endorsed King in his campaign for the open Senate seat in Maine, which King won.

In November 2004, an advertisement began airing in California featuring Ventura, in which he voiced his opposition to then-Governor Arnold Schwarzenegger's policies regarding Native American casinos. Ventura served as an advisory board member for a group called Operation Truth, a nonprofit organization set up "to give voice to troops who served in Iraq." "The current use of the National Guard is wrong....These are men who did not sign up to go occupy foreign nations".

In August 2005, Ventura became the spokesperson for BetUS, an online sportsbook.

On December 29, 2011, Ventura announced his support for Ron Paul on The Alex Jones Show in the 2012 presidential election as "the only anti-war candidate." Like Paul, Ventura is known for supporting a less interventionist foreign policy. But after Mitt Romney became the presumptive Republican nominee in May 2012, Ventura gave his support to Libertarian candidate Gary Johnson on June 12, 2012, who Ventura argued was the choice for voters who "really want to rebel."

In September 2012, Ventura and his wife appeared in an advertisement calling for voters to reject a referendum to be held in Minnesota during the November elections that amend the state constitution to ban same-sex marriage. The referendum was defeated.

In October 2022, Ventura endorsed incumbent governor Tim Walz for reelection in an advertisement, praising Walz's handling of the COVID-19 pandemic, protection of women's rights, and protection of democracy.

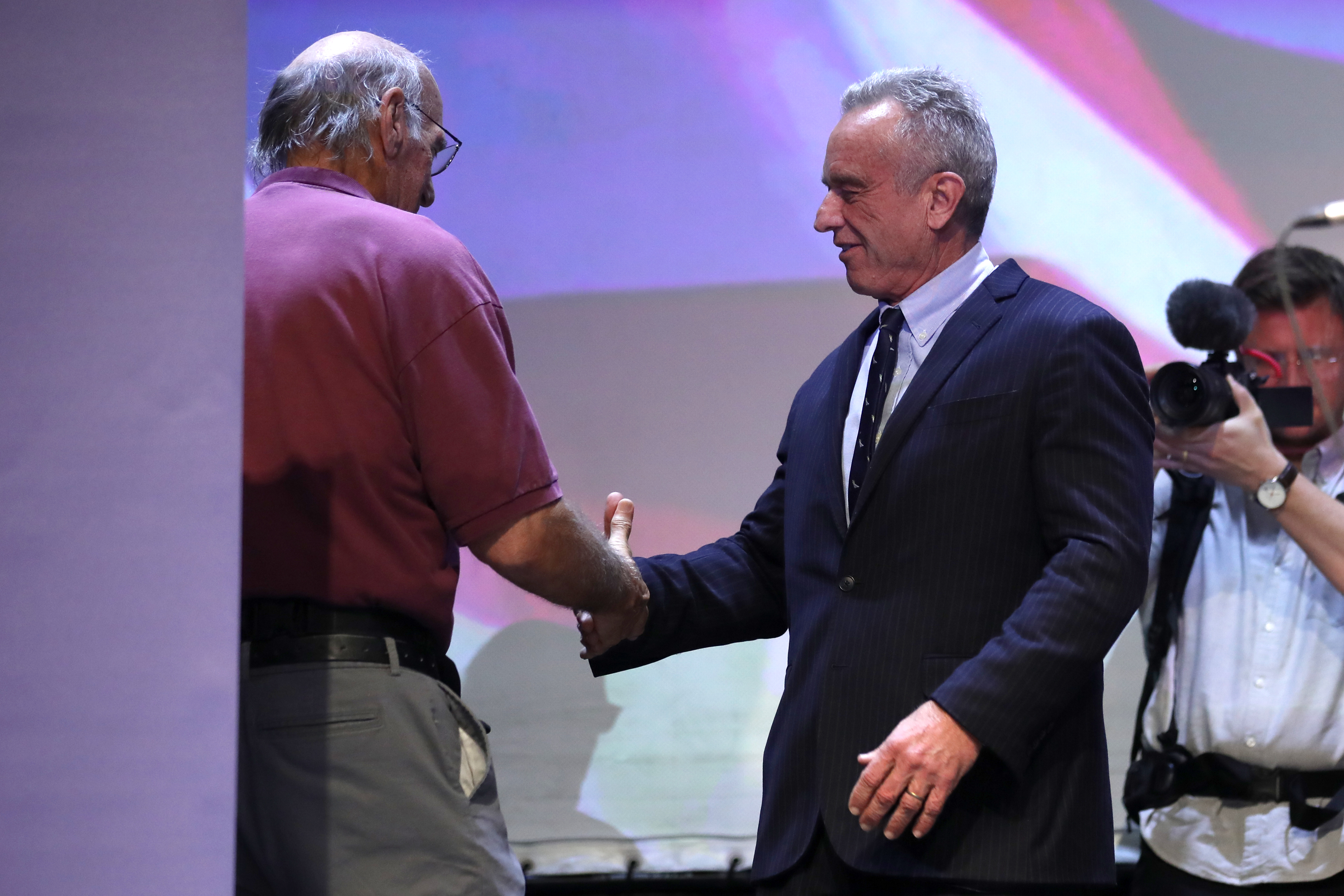
Jesse Ventura and Robert F. Kennedy, Jr. at a 2024 Presidential campaign rally

In March 2024, after Ventura publicly endorsed his independent presidential bid, Robert F. Kennedy Jr. shortlisted him as a candidate for vice president on his campaign ticket; many states require one to meet ballot access deadlines.

After Kennedy withdrew from the race and Kamala Harris chose Walz as her running mate, Ventura endorsed Harris. He strongly defended Walz against attacks by Republicans questioning his military service, pointing out that Walz served well after he reached retirement age. He accused Republican vice-presidential nominee JD Vance of hypocrisy for attacking Walz while standing behind Donald Trump, who avoided being drafted in the Vietnam War. Ventura also criticized Hulk Hogan, who was a featured speaker at the Republican National Convention, saying: "When I was in wrestling in the '80s, I tried to unionize wrestling, and it was Hulk Hogan who cut my legs out from under me... So it doesn't surprise me to see Hogan with the Republicans, because Hogan is as anti-union as it gets."

Ventura returned to the public eye in December 2024, resuming his role as a color commentator for WWE's Saturday Night's Main Event.

Since Trump's return to office, Ventura has compared the state of U.S. politics to that of a rising dictatorship like the Philippines under Ferdinand Marcos. He called Trump a "draft-dodging coward" and the Republican Party a "domestic enemy to our Constitution" for their support of the January 6 United States Capitol attack. In January 2026, Ventura visited Roosevelt High School in Minneapolis after Immigration and Customs Enforcement agents were confronted by a person outside the school, and called the fatal shooting of a Minneapolis resident by an ICE agent a "tragedy" that "did not have to happen".

Ventura expressed interest in entering the 2026 Minnesota gubernatorial election, saying he "only did one term" and was "owed a second". He ultimately did not run.

=== Books ===
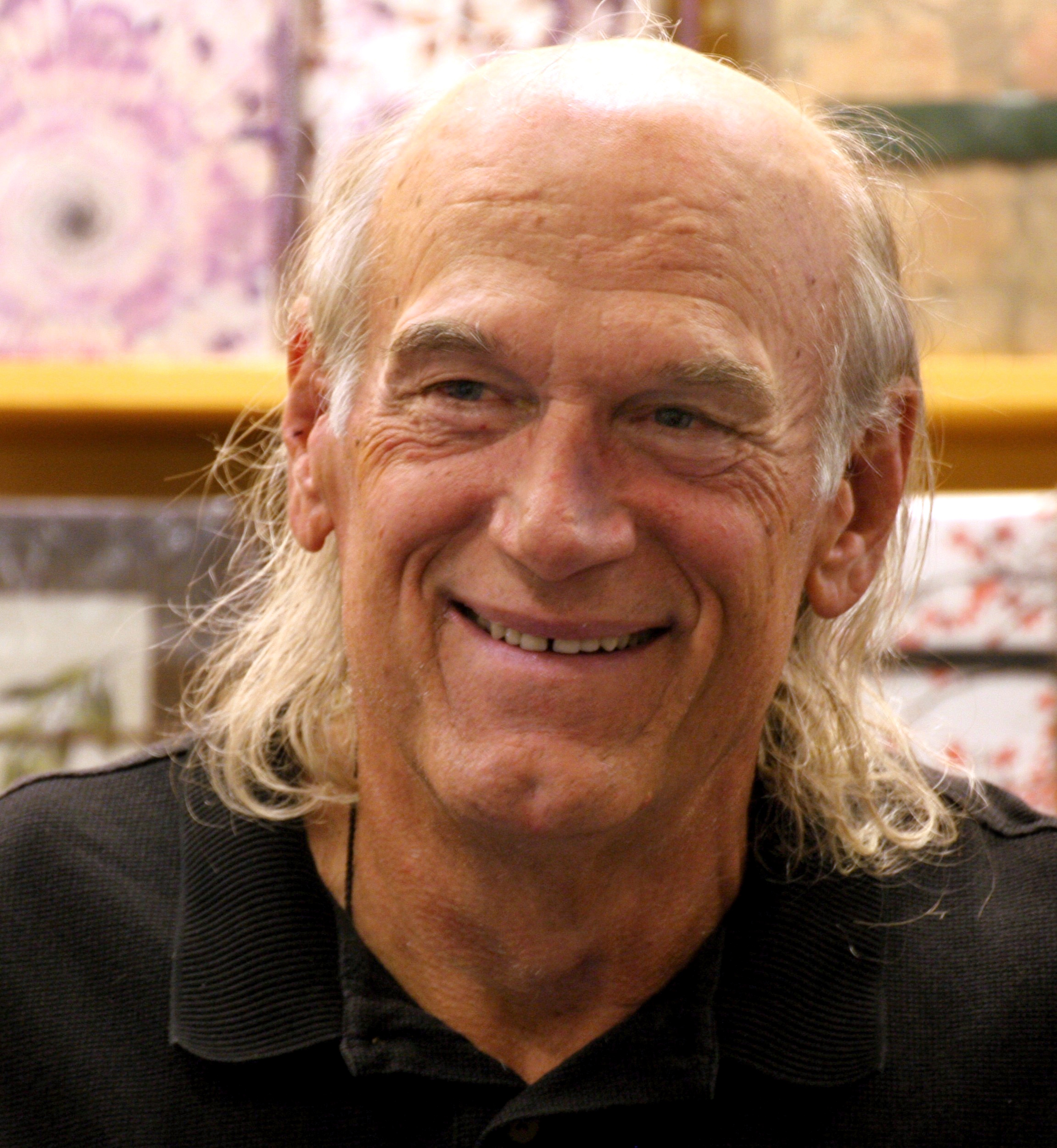
Ventura at a book signing in 2016

Ventura wrote several other books after leaving office. On April 1, 2008, his Don't Start the Revolution Without Me was released. In it, Ventura describes a hypothetical campaign in which he is an independent candidate for president of the United States in 2008. In an interview with the Associated Press at the time of the book's release, Ventura denied any plans for a presidential bid, saying that the scenario was only imaginary and not indicative of a "secret plan to run". On MinnPost.com, Ventura's agent, Steve Schwartz, said of the book, "[Ventura is revealing] why he left politics and discussing the disastrous war in Iraq, why he sees our two-party system as corrupt, and what Fidel Castro told him about who was really behind the assassination of President Kennedy."

Ventura also wrote DemoCRIPS and ReBLOODlicans: No More Gangs in Government, released in 2012. The book expresses Ventura's opposition to the two-party system and calls for political parties to be abolished.

In 2016, Jesse Ventura's Marijuana Manifesto was released. It makes a case for the legalization of cannabis and details various special interests that benefit from keeping it illegal.

=== Conspiracy Theory with Jesse Ventura ===
In December 2009, Ventura began hosting TruTV's new show Conspiracy Theory with Jesse Ventura. "Ventura will hunt down answers, plunging viewers into a world of secret meetings, midnight surveillance, shifty characters and dark forces", truTV said in a statement. On the program, Ventura traveled the country, investigating cases and getting input from believers and skeptics before passing judgment on a theory's validity. According to TruTV, the first episode drew 1.6 million viewers, a record for a new series on the network.

The first season was followed by a second in 2010 and a third in 2012. After three seasons, the show was discontinued in 2013, but as of 2017 it is still shown worldwide on satellite TV.

=== We The People podcast ===
On July 31, 2014, Ventura launched a weekly podcast, We The People, distributed by Adam Carolla's "Carolla Digital", which ran until March 4, 2015. Guests included Larry King, Bill Goldberg, Chris Jericho, Roddy Piper, Donald Trump, Mark Dice, and leading members of the 9/11 Truth movement.

== Disputes ==
=== Navy SEAL background ===
Bill Salisbury, an attorney in San Diego and a former Navy SEAL officer, accused Ventura of "pretending" to be a SEAL. He wrote that Ventura blurred an important distinction by claiming to be a SEAL when he was actually a frogman with the UDT. Compared to the SEAL Teams, first established in 1962 and staffed by UDT personnel, Underwater Demolition Teams conducted more clandestine reconnaissance operations, resulting in fewer casualties than SEAL Team direct action missions during the Vietnam War.

Salisbury described Ventura's Navy training thus:

[Ventura] took a screening test at boot camp to qualify for...Basic Underwater Demolition/SEAL (BUD/S) training...Those who completed BUD/S, when [Ventura] was in training, were sent to either a SEAL or an underwater demolition team. Graduation did not, however, authorize the trainee to call himself a SEAL or a UDT frogman. He had to first successfully complete a six-month probationary period in the Teams.

Responding to the controversy, Ventura's office confirmed that he was a member of the UDT. His spokesman said that Ventura had never said otherwise. Ventura said, "Today we refer to all of us as SEALs. That's all it is." He dismissed the accusations of lying about being a SEAL as "much ado about nothing".

Larry Bailey, a retired Underwater Demolition Team and SEAL Team officer, was asked about these allegations after Salisbury repeated the claims on Fox News. Bailey said, "Jesse Ventura went through UDT/SEAL Class 58 in 1970 and was assigned to UDT-12, where he spent three years...As a UDT frogman, he operated in Viet Nam waters and earned the US Viet Nam Service Ribbon. He undoubtedly, like so may UDT men of that era, went ashore in Viet Nam for short periods of time. After he was released from active duty in 1973, he joined Reserve SEAL Team ONE. The point here is that all graduates of BUD/S are referred to within the Naval Special Warfare community as SEALs. They received the same training, whether they went to SEAL Teams or Underwater Demolition Teams. The case made by Commander Salisbury on Fox News Channel recently is without merit; Jesse Ventura is a SEAL by any definition."

Steve Robinson, a SEAL Team One veteran and the author of No Guts No Glory - Unmasking Navy SEAL Imposters, wrote, "I served in the US Navy with SEAL Team One, and I served with James George 'Jesse Ventura' Janos...He was stationed in the Philippines but was called upon to serve briefly in Vietnam in a SEAL billet. He received instruction in all essential SEAL skills (including classes I taught related to communications and electronics), and ultimately he was a member of RESERVE SEAL TEAM ONE...Jim Janos was and is a real NAVY SEAL...I don't always agree with his politics or his public profile, but he was and is a Navy SEAL Teammate!"

Retired Navy SEAL Don Shipley, who has gained recognition for investigating and publicizing people who make false claims of military service, has also attested to Ventura's status as a Navy SEAL. In an 2018 interview with TruePowerIsMine, Shipley said, "There was a group of SEAL Team One guys who were doing a thankless mission in Vietnam...They wanted some UDT guys to take over the job for them...Jesse went over and took the place of Team One in Vietnam and did it for at least 30 days...Jesse served as a SEAL in Seal Team One...Jesse did his time in Vietnam with Team One...He served in the reserve with SEAL Team One...I'll stand up for the guy." The mission Shipley and Robinson described is consistent with Operation Field Goal, a PSYOP campaign against North Vietnam from July 1972 to January 1973.

Former Navy SEAL Brandon Webb, the editor of SOFREP.com, wrote, "Ventura graduated with Basic Underwater Demolition Class 58 and, like it or not, he earned his status." He disagreed with the argument that Ventura was a UDT and not a SEAL, saying, "try telling that to a WWII UDT veteran who swam ashore before the landing craft on D-Day. [...] The UDTs and SEALs are essentially one and the same. It's why the UDT is still part of the training acronym BUD/S". This sentiment was shared by Vietnam War veteran and retired Marine Corps Major General Charles Bolden, who said, "I wanted to be a SEAL. Back then, they were just called UDT, underwater demolitions team—'frogmen' was the main name for them."

In 1972, while Ventura was on active duty with Underwater Demolition Team 12, the Naval Special Warfare insignia (Seal Trident) became the identifying insignia of all SEAL and UDT personnel. This insignia has since been codified as denoting SEAL status, with the Navy's military personnel manual explicitly stating that the trident insignia signifies a qualified SEAL. Per SEAL veteran and future Navy Commander Tim Bosiljevac:

By the early 1970s, since all frogmen were parachute qualified, the UDT and SEAL symbols were merged as one. The design which remained was the original SEAL design...The breast insignia could only be worn by those men who graduated from BUD/S and had additionally served a six month minimum probationary period within an active SEAL or UDT unit...The UDT/SEAL breast Insignia was too large and stood out too loudly, just like the men who wore it. Encountering such an attitude, frogmen wore it much more proudly.

In 2009, the National Archives described Ventura as a "Former Navy SEAL". In the 2014 Ventura v. Kyle defamation trial, the United States District Court for the District of Minnesota wrote, "Ventura served as a member of the Navy Special Forces Underwater Demolition/SEAL Teams during the Vietnam War."

=== Lawsuit against the TSA ===
In January 2011, Ventura filed a lawsuit against the Transportation Security Administration, seeking a declaration that the agency's new controversial pat-down policy violated citizens' Fourth Amendment rights and an injunction to bar the TSA from subjecting him to the pat-down procedures. Ventura received a titanium hip replacement in 2008 that sets off metal detectors at airport security checkpoints.

The U.S. district court dismissed the suit for lack of jurisdiction in November 2011, ruling that "challenges to TSA orders, policies and procedures" must be brought only in the U.S. courts of appeals. After the court's ruling, Ventura held a press conference in which he called the federal judges cowards; said he no longer felt patriotic and would henceforth refer to the U.S. as the "Fascist States of America"; said he would never take commercial flights again; said he would seek dual citizenship in Mexico; and said he would "never stand for a national anthem again" and would instead raise a fist.

=== Chris Kyle dispute ===
During a January 2012 interview on Opie and Anthony to promote his autobiography American Sniper, former Navy SEAL Chris Kyle said he had punched Ventura in 2006 at a bar in Coronado, California, during a wake for Michael A. Monsoor, a fellow SEAL who had been killed in Iraq. According to Kyle, Ventura was vocally expressing opposition to the War in Iraq. Kyle, who wrote about the alleged incident in his book but did not mention Ventura by name, said he approached Ventura and asked him to lower his voice because the families of SEAL personnel were present, but that Ventura responded that the SEALs "deserved to lose a few guys." Kyle said he then punched Ventura. Ventura denied the event occurred.

==== Lawsuit ====
In January 2012, after Kyle declined to retract his statement, Ventura sued Kyle for defamation in federal court. In a motion filed by Kyle's attorney in August 2012 to dismiss two of the suit's three counts, declarations by five former SEALs and the mothers of two others supported Kyle's account. But in a motion filed by Ventura, Bill DeWitt, a close friend of Ventura and former SEAL who was present with him at the bar, suggested that Ventura interacted with a few SEALs but was involved in no confrontation with Kyle and that Kyle's claims were false. DeWitt's wife also said she witnessed no fight between Kyle and Ventura.

In 2013, while the lawsuit was ongoing, Kyle was murdered in an unrelated incident, and Ventura substituted Taya Kyle, Chris Kyle's widow and the executor of his estate, as the defendant. After a three-week trial in federal court in St. Paul in July 2014, the jury reached an 8–2 divided verdict in Ventura's favor, and awarded him $1.85 million, $500,000 for defamation and $1,345,477.25 for unjust enrichment. Ventura testified at the trial. In August 2014, U.S. District Judge Richard H. Kyle (no relation to Chris Kyle) upheld the jury's award, finding it "reasonable and supported by a preponderance of the evidence." Attorneys for Kyle's estate said that the defamation damages would be covered by HarperCollins's libel insurance. The unjust enrichment award was not covered by insurance. After the verdict, HarperCollins announced that it would remove the sub-chapter "Punching out Scruff Face" from all future editions of Kyle's book. Kyle's estate moved for either judgment as a matter of law or a new trial. In November 2014, the district court denied the motions.

Kyle's estate appealed to the U.S. Court of Appeals for the Eighth Circuit. Oral argument was held in October 2015, and on June 13, 2016, the appeals court vacated and reversed the unjust-enrichment judgment, and vacated and remanded the defamation judgment for a new trial, holding that "We cannot accept Ventura's unjust-enrichment theory, because it enjoys no legal support under Minnesota law. Ventura's unjust-enrichment claim fails as a matter of law." Ventura sought to appeal the circuit court's decision to the U.S. Supreme Court, but in January 2017, the Supreme Court declined to hear the appeal.

In December 2014, Ventura sued publisher HarperCollins over the same statement in American Sniper. In December 2017, Ventura and HarperCollins settled the dispute on undisclosed terms, and Ventura dropped his lawsuit against both the publisher and Kyle's estate.

== Personal life ==
=== Family ===
On July 18, 1975, three days after his 24th birthday, Ventura married his wife, Terry. The couple have two children: a son, Tyrel, who is a film and television director and producer, and a daughter, Jade. With the exception of the first two WrestleManias, Ventura always said hello to "Terry, Tyrel and Jade back in Minneapolis" during his commentary at the annual event. Tyrel also had the honor of inducting his father into the WWE Hall of Fame class of 2004, and worked on Conspiracy Theory with Jesse Ventura, including as an investigator in the show's third season.

Ventura and his wife split their time between White Bear Lake, Minnesota, and Los Cabos, Baja California Sur, Mexico. Regarding his life in Mexico, Ventura has said:

I live one hour from pavement and one hour from electricity. I drive down and back every year and it's truly an adventure to live down there where I do, because I'm off the grid. I have electricity, but it's all solar. I'm completely solar-powered down there. And it makes you pay more attention. It makes you turn the lights off when you're not using them.

=== Health ===
During his wrestling days, Ventura used anabolic steroids. He admitted this after retiring from competition and went on to make public service announcements and appear in printed ads and on posters warning young people about the potential dangers and potential health risks of abusing steroids.

In 2002, Ventura was hospitalized for a severe blood clot in his lungs, the same kind of injury that ended his wrestling career.

=== Religious beliefs ===
In 1999, Ventura said during an NBC News interview that he was baptized a Lutheran; later, he said on The Joe Rogan Experience that he was an atheist. In a Playboy interview, Ventura said, "Organized religion is a sham and a crutch for weak-minded people who need strength in numbers. It tells people to go out and stick their noses in other people's business. I live by the golden rule: Treat others as you'd want them to treat you. The religious right wants to tell people how to live." In his 1999 bestselling memoir I Ain't Got Time to Bleed, Ventura responded to the controversy sparked by these remarks by elaborating on his views on religion:

I'd like to clarify my comments published in Playboy about religious people being weak-minded. I didn't mean all religious people. I don't have any problem with the vast majority of religious folks. I count myself among them, more or less. But I believe because it makes sense to me, not because I think it can be proven. There are lots of people out there who think they know the truth about God and religion, but does anybody really know for sure? That's why the Founding Fathers built freedom of religious belief into the structure of this nation, so that everybody could make up their minds for themselves. But I do have a problem with the people who think they have some right to try to impose their beliefs on others. I hate what the fundamentalist fanatics are doing to our country. It seems as though, if everybody doesn't accept their version of reality, that somehow invalidates it for them. Everybody must believe the same things they do. That's what I find weak and destructive.

In April 2011, Ventura said on The Howard Stern Show that he is an atheist and that his beliefs could disqualify him for office in the future: "I don't believe you can be an atheist and admit it and get elected in our country." In an October 2010 CNN interview, Ventura claimed religion was the "root of all evil", adding, "you notice every war is fought over religion."

As governor, Ventura endorsed equal rights for religious minorities, as well as people who do not believe in God, by declaring July 4, 2002, "Indivisible Day". He inadvertently proclaimed October 13–19, 2002, "Christian Heritage Week" in Minnesota.

== Championships, accomplishments, and decorations ==
- American Wrestling Association
  - AWA World Tag Team Championship (1 time) – with Adrian Adonis
- Cauliflower Alley Club
  - Iron Mike Mazurki Award (1999)
- Central States Wrestling
  - NWA World Tag Team Championship (Central States version) (1 time) – with Tank Patton
- Continental Wrestling Association
  - AWA Southern Heavyweight Championship (2 times)
- George Tragos/Lou Thesz Professional Wrestling Hall of Fame
  - Frank Gotch Award (2003)
- NWA Hawaii
  - NWA Hawaii Tag Team Championship (1 time) – with Steve Strong
- Pacific Northwest Wrestling
  - NWA Pacific Northwest Heavyweight Championship (2 times)
  - NWA Pacific Northwest Tag Team Championship (5 times) – with Bull Ramos (2), Buddy Rose (2) and Jerry Oates (1)
- Pro Wrestling Illustrated
  - Ranked No. 239 of the top 500 singles wrestlers during the "PWI Years" in 2003
  - Ranked No. 67 of the top 100 tag teams of the "PWI Years" with Adrian Adonis
- Ring Around The Northwest Newsletter
  - Wrestler of the Year (1976)
- World Wrestling Entertainment
  - WWE Hall of Fame (Class of 2004)
- Wrestling Observer Newsletter Awards
  - Best Color Commentator (1987–1990)
  - Wrestling Observer Newsletter Hall of Fame (Class 2026)

=== Medals and ribbons ===
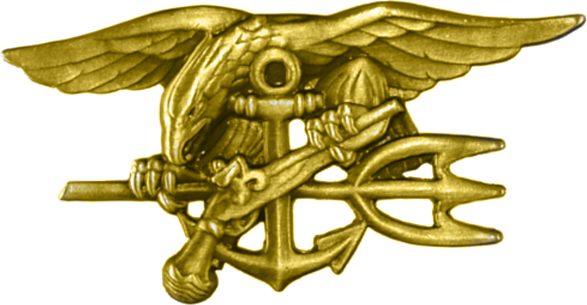

== Elections ==
1990 Brooklyn Park mayoral election
Name	Votes	Percent	Outcome
Jesse Ventura, non-partisan	12,728	63.3	gain
Jim Krautkremer (inc.), non-partisan	7,390	36.7	loss

1998 Minnesota gubernatorial election
Party	Candidate	Votes	%	±%
Reform	Jesse Ventura	773,713	37.0	n/a
Republican	Norm Coleman	717,350	34.3	−29.0
Democratic (DFL)	Hubert H. "Skip" Humphrey III	587,528	28.1	−6.0
Green	Ken Pentel	7,034	0.3	n/a
	Others	5,365	0.3	n/a
	Write-ins	776		n/a
Majority		56,363	2.7	
Turnout		2,091,766	60.0	
Reform gain from Republican		Swing		

2020 United States presidential election in Alaska
Party	Candidate	Votes	%	±%
Republican	Donald Trump Mike Pence	189,951	52.8	+1.6
Democratic	Joe Biden Kamala Harris	153,778	42.8	+6.2
Libertarian	Jo Jorgensen Spike Cohen	8,897	2.5	−3.4
Green	Jesse Ventura Cynthia McKinney	2,673	0.7	−1.1
Constitution	Don Blankenship William Mohr	1,127	0.3	−0.9
Independent	Brock Pierce Karla Ballard	825	0.2	N/A
Alliance	Rocky De La Fuente Darcy Richardson	318	0.1	N/A
Write-in		1,961	0.6	N/A
Total votes		359,530	100	+6.7
Republican hold		Swing		

== Bibliography ==
- I Ain't Got Time to Bleed: Reworking the Body Politic from the Bottom Up (1999) ISBN 978-0-375-50332-0
- Do I Stand Alone? Going to the Mat Against Political Pawns and Media Jackals (2000) ISBN 978-0-7434-0586-7
- Jesse Ventura Tells it Like it Is: America's Most Outspoken Governor Speaks Out About Government (August 1, 2002, co-authored with Heron Marquez) ISBN 978-0-8225-0385-9
- Don't Start the Revolution Without Me! (2008, co-authored with Dick Russell) ISBN 978-1-60239-273-1
- American Conspiracies: Lies, Lies, and More Dirty Lies That the Government Tells Us (2010, co-authored with Dick Russell) ISBN 978-1-60239-802-3. Updated and revised edition (2015, co-authored with Dick Russell) ISBN 978-1-6345-0545-1
- 63 Documents the Government Doesn't Want You to Read (2011, co-authored with Dick Russell) ISBN 978-1-61608-226-0
- DemoCRIPS and ReBLOODlicans: No More Gangs in Government (2012, co-authored with Dick Russell) ISBN 978-1-6160-8448-6
- They Killed Our President: 63 Reasons to Believe There Was a Conspiracy to Assassinate JFK (2013, with Dick Russell & David Wayne) ISBN 978-1-6263-6139-3
- Sh*t Politicians Say: The Funniest, Dumbest, Most Outrageous Things Ever Uttered By Our "Leaders" (2016) ISBN 978-1-5107-1417-5
- Marijuana Manifesto (2016) ISBN 978-1-5107-1424-3

== See also ==
- List of American politicians who switched parties in office
- List of United States Navy SEALs

Party political offices
First	Reform nominee for Governor of Minnesota; 1998	Succeeded by Tim Penny as Independence nominee
Political offices
Preceded by Arne Carlson	Governor of Minnesota; 1999–2003	Succeeded by Tim Pawlenty
U.S. order of precedence (ceremonial)
Preceded by Arne Carlson as Former Governor	Order of precedence of the United States	Succeeded by Tim Pawlenty as Former Governor
