= Richard Case Nagell =

American military officer and alleged CIA double agent

- Born: August 5, 1930
- Died: November 1, 1995 (aged 65); Los Angeles, California
- Occupation: CIA officer
- Employer: Central Intelligence Agency
- Known for: Alleged foreknowledge of John F. Kennedy assassination

Richard Case Nagell (August 5, 1930 – November 1, 1995) was a United States Army veteran and alleged former CIA double agent. He was arrested for attempted bank robbery in September 1963, an event which Nagell claimed he intentionally orchestrated to result in his arrest due to his supposed pre-knowledge of the assassination of President John F. Kennedy in November 1963.

== Biography ==
On 17 December 1941, aged 11, he was admitted to the Albany Home for Children, an orphanage. His father, Louis, had died during his early childhood, and his mother was listed as "destitute" when she placed him in the care of the institution. When he turned 18 and graduated from high school he discharged himself from Albany Home to join the army.

Nagell entered the US Army in 1948, served in two tours of duty in the Korean War with the 24th Infantry Division where he was awarded three Purple Hearts and a Bronze Star. and was honourably discharged with the rank of Captain in 1959. In November 1954 he was the sole survivor of a plane crash that left him with facial injuries. In November 1958 he married nineteen-year-old Mitsuko Takahashi in Tokyo. She petitioned for United States citizenship in December 1963 in Honolulu and was granted citizenship in May 1964 while a resident of Los Angeles.

Nagell was arrested on September 20, 1963 after he entered the State National Bank in El Paso, Texas and fired two shots into the ceiling of the bank. Nagell walked out of the bank after firing his weapon and sat down and waited for the police to arrive. He was sentenced in 1964 to ten years in prison, but acquitted after a 1968 retrial. According to a 1968 memo from the Central Intelligence Agency, Nagell claimed he had wished to be incarcerated at the time of Kennedy's assassination. Nagell claimed in 1969 that before his 1964 arrest, he had been "operating in an undercover role, having become involved in a domestic-inspired plot to assassinate President John F. Kennedy".

Nagell met with New Orleans District Attorney Jim Garrison in the late 1960s, who at the time was investigating Clay Shaw's possible complicity in the assassination. Director Oliver Stone cited Nagell's relationship with Garrison as a justification for the character of 'Mr. X.' in his 1991 film JFK, stating that "I feel that was not a violation of the spirit of the truth, because Garrison also met a Deep Throat type named Richard Case Nagell".

On 11 June 1968 Nagell was detained by East German authorities after attempting to enter the state via train from Zurich, Switzerland. The Stasi's records note that Nagell told them that "the CIA tasked him with investigating an organization that was planning the death of the U.S. president. In the course of his apparently successful investigation, he received the order to shoot Lee Oswald before the attack on Kennedy". Suspected of espionage, he was held in remand at Berlin-Hohenschönhausen prison before being released. Nagell told the Stasi that his intention was to apply for political asylum at the Cuban embassy in East Berlin.

Dick Russell's biography of Nagell was published in 1992 under the title The Man Who Knew Too Much. Russell first met Nagell back in 1975 when he showed up unannounced on Nagell's doorstep. The book expands on Nagell's earlier claims with additional research to argue Nagell had foreknowledge of assassination of President John F. Kennedy, and also supported Nagell's claim he had gotten himself arrested in the El Paso bank shooting in late September 1963 to avoid becoming a patsy.

== Death ==
Nagell died from heart disease on November 1, 1995, in Los Angeles, California. He was 65 years old at the time of his death and is buried in Arlington National Cemetery. Although he was not interviewed by the Warren Commission (1964) and the House Select Committee on Assassinations (1976–8), the Assassination Records Review Board (1994–8) expressed interest in Nagell. Nagell had claimed to the author Dick Russell that he had in his possession a polaroid photograph of himself and Oswald taken in New Orleans, an audio tape of Oswald and others discussing the future assassination of Kennedy, and documentary proof of a letter he sent to FBI director J. Edgar Hoover in September 1963 warning of a plot to assassinate the President. The ARRB sent a letter to Nagell requesting information or records which he may have in his possession, however he died a day after the letter was mailed. Subsequently the ARRB travelled to California to inspect Nagell's apartment with the help of his son and niece. A second inspection trip of storage facilities registered to Nagell in Phoenix, Arizona also occurred. Neither trips uncovered any of the above records Nagell claimed to have had.

== Publications ==
- Man in the Middle: The Inside Story (What the Controlled Press and Official Reports Forgot to Mention). (January 28, 1970).
