= Dick Russell (author) =

American journalist (born 1947)

- Born: August 19, 1947 (age 79); Minneapolis, Minnesota, U.S.
- Occupations: Investigative journalist, author, environmental activist
- Notable work: The Man Who Knew Too Much, Eye of the Whale, The Real RFK Jr.

Dick Russell (born August 19, 1947) is an American investigative journalist, author, and environmental activist. He is best known for his research on the assassination of John F. Kennedy, his environmental advocacy for marine conservation, and his biographies of public figures including psychologist James Hillman, former Minnesota governor Jesse Ventura, and presidential candidate Robert F. Kennedy Jr. Russell has published sixteen books by 2025, several of which have been on the New York Times best seller list or recognized among the best books of the year by outlets such as the Los Angeles Times and The Washington Post.

== Early life and education ==
Russell was born in Minneapolis, Minnesota, on August 19, 1947, and grew up there and in suburbs of Chicago and Kansas City. A sports fan, he began writing for local newspapers about his hometown teams and in 1968 became a paid intern at Sports Illustrated in New York. Following graduation from the University of Kansas in 1969, he joined the staff of Sports Illustrated full-time, but resigned after seven months to travel overseas with a backpack and typewriter. His travels later became the subject of the documentary Hitchhiking to the Edge of Sanity. For a year and a half he roamed across Europe, Africa, and the Middle East, while writing a weekly column for the Topeka Capital-Journal. He later returned to New York to freelance for numerous publications.

== Career ==
Russell’s early career included reporting on covert operations and intelligence agencies. He gained recognition for his extensive research into the assassination of President John F. Kennedy, culminating in his book The Man Who Knew Too Much (1992). The book profiles Richard Case Nagell and presents an alternative theory to the official narrative of the JFK assassination. Publishers Weekly praised it as a "model work of historical reconstruction," and Kirkus Reviews called it "gripping," citing Russell's "dogged original research and superb narrative skills."

In 1977, Russell was hired by TV Guide as a staff writer in its Hollywood bureau, where his cover stories included profiles of Bob Hope, James Arness, and behind-the-scenes reporting on The Tonight Show Starring Johnny Carson. After two and a half years he left the magazine to resume freelancing, contributing to Boston Magazine and the NRDC’s Amicus Journal.

In environmental activism, Russell became a leader in a coast-wide campaign to protect the endangered Atlantic striped bass, for which he received the Chevron Conservation Award in 1988. He took part in campaigns to stop ocean dumping, block a radioactive waste site, and preserve coral reefs. He also wrote numerous environmental articles and authored Eye of the Whale (2001), a study of gray whale migration and conservation. The book was a finalist for the 2001 Los Angeles Times Book Prize and was named one of the best books of the year by the Los Angeles Times and The Washington Post. The New York Times Book Review praised his documentation of the whale’s life cycle, while The New Yorker described it as a "superb natural-history book." Russell testified at a public hearing conducted by the Assassination Records Review Board held in Boston on 24 March 1995.

Among his sixteen published books by 2025, Russell authored a three-volume biography of psychologist James Hillman, exploring Hillman’s influence on depth psychology, as well as the memoir My Mysterious Son: A Life-Changing Passage Between Schizophrenia and Shamanism.

Russell co-authored several New York Times bestsellers with Jesse Ventura, the former governor of Minnesota. These include Don't Start the Revolution Without Me! (2008), co-written by Ventura and Russell. He also co-authored American Conspiracies (2010), as listed on the book's Wikipedia page. In 2011, they published 63 Documents the Government Doesn't Want You to Read. Another collaborative title is DemoCRIPS and ReBLOODlicans: No More Gangs in Government (2012).

Russell is the author of Horsemen of the Apocalypse (2017), a book about climate change and the fossil fuel industry which was edited and introduced by Robert F. Kennedy Jr.. He penned the afterword to a 2018 edition of Gaeton Fonzi's The Last Investigation. He is also the author of The Real RFK Jr. (2023), an authorized biography and portrait of Kennedy’s life and political philosophy.

In 2026 the book Who Killed JFK? Solving America's Greatest Murder Mystery was released, which Russell co-wrote with David E. Hoffman and film director Rob Reiner. It was based off the podcast series on the assassination Reiner co-hosted with Soledad O'Brien.

== Authored works ==
=== Books ===
- The Man Who Knew Too Much (1992)
- Black Genius (1999)
- Eye of the Whale (2001)
- Striper Wars: An American Fish Story (2005)
- On the Trail of the JFK Assassins (2008)
- Don't Start the Revolution Without Me! (2008, with Jesse Ventura)
- American Conspiracies (2010, with Jesse Ventura)
- 63 Documents the Government Doesn't Want You to Read (2011, with Jesse Ventura)
- Horsemen of the Apocalypse (2017, with Robert F. Kennedy Jr.)
- The Real RFK Jr. (2023)
- (with Rob Reiner and David Hoffman) Who Killed JFK? Solving America's Greatest Murder Mystery. Gallery Books. 2026. ISBN 978-1668083871.

=== Other ===
- "Foreword" in Janney, Peter (2013). Mary's Mosaic: The CIA Conspiracy to Murder John F. Kennedy, Mary Pinchot Meyer, and Their Vision for World Peace. Skyhorse Publishing. ISBN 978-1626361270.
- "Afterword" in Fonzi, Gaeton. The Last Investigation (2018 ed.). Skyhorse Publishing. ISBN 978-1510740327.

== Reception and impact ==
Russell’s journalism has been praised for its depth of research and narrative quality: Publishers Weekly described The Man Who Knew Too Much as a “model work of historical reconstruction,” while Kirkus Reviews called it “gripping.”

=== Media appearances ===
- Featured on Who Killed JFK?, a podcast hosted by Rob Reiner and Soledad O’Brien, where Russell discusses theories about the assassination.
- Appeared on Ask Dr. Drew in the segment “The REAL RFK Jr.: Dick Russell on The 2024 Presidential Candidate.”
- Participated in the documentary The Real RFK Jr.: Trials of a Truth Warrior.
